= Masaharu Fukuyama discography =

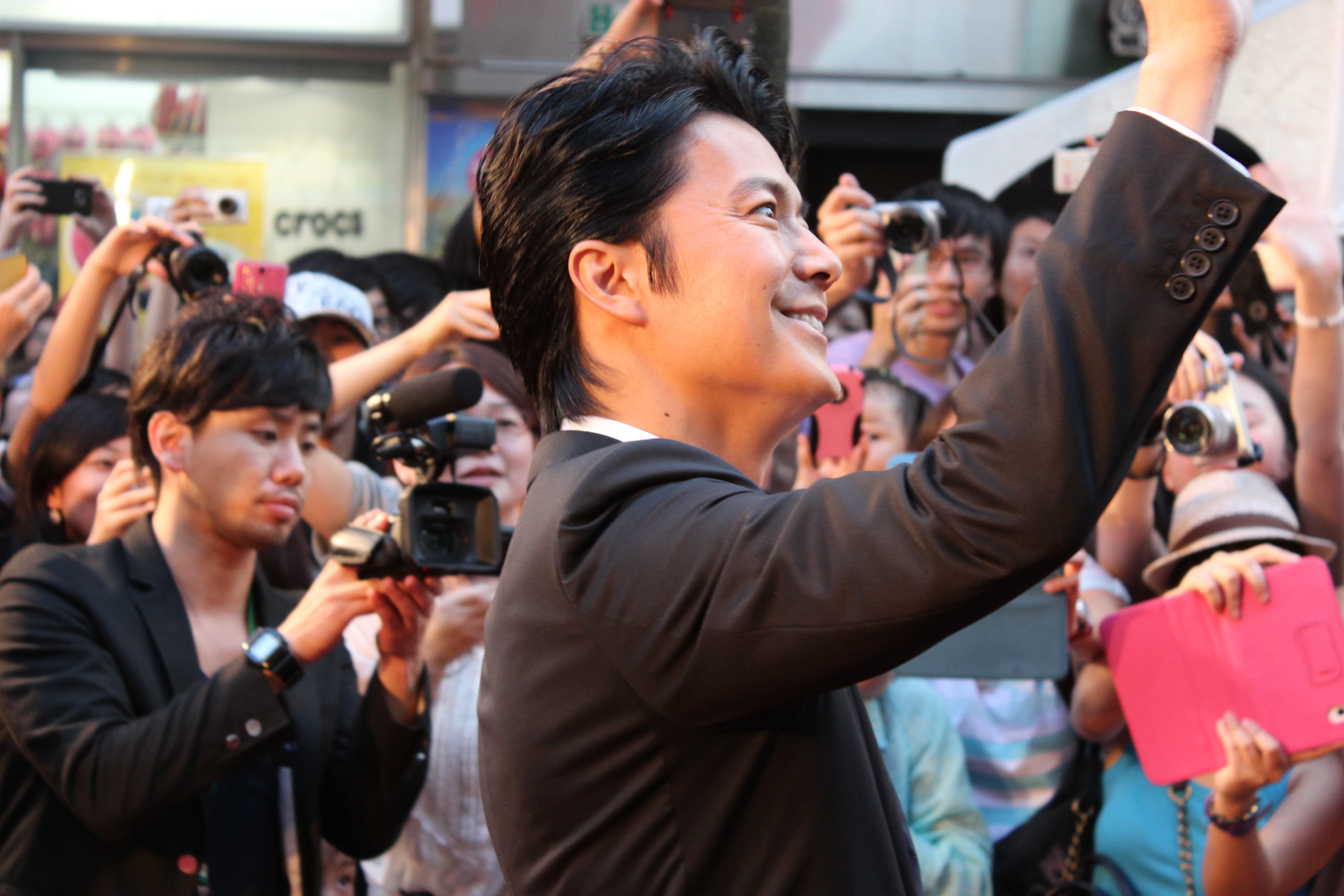
- Fukuyama in Taipei, promoting his film Midsummer's Equation (2013).
- Studio albums: 13
- Soundtrack albums: 6
- Live albums: 1
- Compilation albums: 4
- Singles: 31
- Video albums: 21
- Remix albums: 3
- Cover albums: 2

The discography of Japanese singer and actor Masaharu Fukuyama consists of thirteen studio albums, four compilation albums, three remix albums, twenty video albums, and numerous physical and promotional singles. Fukuyama debuted through BMG Japan by releasing the single "Tsuioku no Ame no Naka" (1990) and the album Dengon. The works failed to chart, however, in 1992 the single "Good Night", aided by the popularity it gained through use in the drama Ai wa Dō da, charted on the Oricon Singles Chart, peaking at number nine. In 1993, his album Calling became his first number one album on the Oricon Albums Chart; it has sold over 850,000 copies in Japan and has been certified two-times platinum by the Recording Industry Association of Japan (RIAJ).

His 1994 single "It's Only Love/Sorry Baby" became his first million-selling work in Japan. The parent album, On and On topped the album chart and was certified two-times platinum by the RIAJ. Following this, Fukuyama reduced the amount of recording he did and decided to concentrate on his acting career. After switching to Universal Music in 2000, Fukuyama released the single "Sakura Zaka", which sold over two million copies and was certified two-times million by the RIAJ. In 2003, the triple A-side single "Niji/Himawari/Sore ga Subete sa" topped the Oricon Single Chart for five weeks and was certified million by the RIAJ. The studio album featuring the single, 5 Nen Mono, was released in 2006.

Fukuyama acted in the TV drama Galileo in 2007 and formed a band Koh+ with his co-actor in the series Kō Shibasaki. The band released two gold-certified singles "Kiss Shite" and "Saiai" in 2007 and 2008 respectively. Fukuyama also contributed to the series' soundtrack. The singer released two more studio albums, Zankyō (2009) and Human (2014), both of which topped the Oricon Albums Chart.

== Albums ==
=== Studio albums ===
List of albums, with selected chart positions
| Title | Album details | Peak positions | | | | Sales (JPN) | Certifications |
| Title | Album details | JPN | KOR Overseas (Note: The Gaon Albums Chart was established in 2010.) (Note: Week references for Gaon: Human and The Best Bang!!) | TWN (Note: The G-Music chart was established in July 2005 and only archives the top 20 releases.) | TWN East Asian (Note: The G-Music East Asian chart is a sub-chart, so releases listed may not have charted on the main top 20.) (Note: Positions taken from 2007 week 6 for 5 Nen Mono, 2009 week 28 for Zankyō, and 2014 week 23 for Human) | Sales (JPN) | Certifications |
|---|---|---|---|---|---|---|---|
| Dengon (伝言; "Rumor") | Released: April 21, 1990; Label: BMG Victor (BVCR-2); Format(s): CD, cassette | — | — | — | — | | |
| Lion | Released: March 21, 1991; Label: BMG Victor (BVCR-32); Format(s): CD, cassette | — | — | — | — | | |
| Bros. | Released: November 21, 1991; Label: BMG Victor (BVCR-59); Format(s): CD, cassette | 52 | — | — | — | 20,000 | |
| Boots | Released: November 21, 1992; Label: BMG Victor (BVCR-100); Format(s): CD, cassette | 11 | — | — | — | 181,000 | |
| Calling | Released: October 21, 1993; Label: BMG Victor (BVCR-638); Format(s): CD, cassette | 1 | — | — | — | 853,000 | JPN: Million |
| On and On | Released: June 9, 1994; Label: BMG Victor (BVCR-666); Format(s): CD, cassette | 1 | — | — | — | 712,000 | JPN: 2× Platinum |
| Sing a Song | Released: June 24, 1998; Label: BMG Victor (BVCR-808); Format(s): CD | 5 | — | — | — | 386,000 | JPN: Platinum |
| F | Released: April 25, 2001; Label: Universal Music (UUCH-1013); Format(s): CD, LP | 2 | — | — | — | 875,000 | JPN: Million |
| 5 Nen Mono | Released: December 6, 2006; Label: Universal Music (UUCH-1070); Format(s): CD | 1 | — | — | 2 | 438,000 | JPN: 2× Platinum |
| Zankyō | Released: June 30, 2009; Label: Universal Music (UUCH-1072); Format(s): CD, CD+DVD | 1 | — | — | 8 | 485,000 | JPN: 2× Platinum |
| Human | Released: April 2, 2014; Label: Universal Music (UUCH-9051); Format(s): CD, CD+DVD | 1 | 28 | 7 | 2 | 346,000 | JPN: Platinum |
| Akira | Released: December 8, 2020; Label: Universal Music; Format(s): CD, CD+DVD | 1 | — | — | — | | |
| Supernova (超新星) | Released: September 9, 2026; Label: Amuse; Format(s): CD | 1 | — | — | — | 113,131 | JPN: Gold |
"—" denotes items which were released before the creation of the G-Music charts and/or the Gaon charts, or items that did not chart.

=== Compilation albums ===
List of albums, with selected chart positions
| Title | Album details | Peak positions | | | | Sales (JPN) | Certifications |
| Title | Album details | JPN | KOR | KOR Overseas | TWN East Asian (Note: Position taken from 2011 week 13 for The Best Bang!!, Fuku no Oto.) | Sales (JPN) | Certifications |
|---|---|---|---|---|---|---|---|
| M Collection: Kaze o Sagashiteru | Released: February 6, 1995; Label: BMG Victor (BVCR-8803); Format(s): CD | 1 | — | — | — | 1,871,000 | JPN: Million |
| Magnum Collection 1999 "Dear" | Released: December 8, 1999; Label: BMG Funhouse (BVCR-18013/4); Format(s): CD | 1 | — | — | — | 1,387,000 | JPN: Million (Note: Initially received a 4× Platinum certification for 1,600,000 copies shipped, however the 4× Platinum threshold was retired in 2003.) |
| Magnum Collection "Slow" | Released: August 27, 2003; Label: BMG Funhouse (BVCR-11056); Format(s): CD | 1 | — | — | — | 387,000 | JPN: Platinum |
| The Best Bang!! | Released: November 17, 2010; Label: Universal Music (UUCH-1073/6); Format(s): CD, CD+DVD | 1 | 29 | 5 | 4 | 724,000 | JPN: 3× Platinum |
| Fuku no Oto (福の音) | Released: December 23, 2015; Label: Universal Music (UUCH-9052); Format(s): CD, CD+DVD, digital download | 1 | — | — | 1 | 286,000 | |
"—" denotes items which were released before the creation of the G-Music charts and/or the Gaon charts, or items that did not chart.

=== Cover albums ===
List of albums, with selected chart positions
| Title | Album details | Peak positions | Sales (JPN) | Certifications |
| Title | Album details | JPN | Sales (JPN) | Certifications |
|---|---|---|---|---|
| 'Fukuyama Engineering' Soundtrack The Golden Oldies | Released: June 26, 2002; Label: BMG Funhouse (BVCS-27005); Format(s): CD | 2 | 561,000 | JPN: Platinum |
| Tama Riku (魂リク) | Released: April 8, 2015; Label: Universal J; Format(s): CD, CD+DVD, digital download | 1 | 123,000 | JPN: Platinum |

=== Live albums ===
List of albums, with selected chart positions
| Title | Album details | Peak positions | Sales (JPN) | Certifications |
| Title | Album details | JPN | Sales (JPN) | Certifications |
|---|---|---|---|---|
| Acoustic Live Best Selection "Live Fukuyamania" | Released: June 27, 2001; Label: BMG Funhouse (BVCS-27005); Format(s): CD | 4 | 224,000 | JPN: Gold |

=== Remix albums ===
List of albums, with selected chart positions
| Title | Album details | Peak positions | | Sales (JPN) | Certifications |
| Title | Album details | JPN | TWN East Asian (Note: Position taken from 2006 week 32 for Another Works Remixed by Piston Nishizawa) | Sales (JPN) | Certifications |
|---|---|---|---|---|---|
| Fukuyama Presents Magnum Classics: Kissin' in the Holy Night (with Royal Philharmonic Orchestra) | Released: December 6, 2000; Label: Universal Music (UUCH-1011); Format(s): CD | 10 | — | 84,000 | |
| Fukuyama Presents Acoustic Fukuyamania | Released: March 23, 2005; Label: Universal Music (UUCH-1011); Format(s): CD | 7 | — | 43,000 | |
| Another Works Remixed by Piston Nishizawa | Released: May 24, 2005; Label: Ariola Japan (BVCR-14028); Format(s): CD | 2 | 15 | 175,000 | JPN: Platinum |
"—" denotes items which were released before the creation of the G-Music charts and/or the Gaon charts, or items that did not chart.

=== Soundtrack albums ===
List of albums, with selected chart positions
| Title | Album details | Peak positions | Sales (JPN) | Certifications |
| Title | Album details | JPN | Sales (JPN) | Certifications |
|---|---|---|---|---|
| M-Collection Birthday Present | Released: October 21, 1995; Label: BMG Victor (BVCR-8021/2); Format(s): CD | 2 | 344,000 | JPN: Gold |
| More | Released: April 30, 1998; Label: BMG Victor (BVCR-4701); Format(s): CD | 13 | 66,000 | |
| Rendezvous 1: "Perfect Love!" Original Song Book | Released: August 4, 1999; Label: BMG Funhouse (BVCS-27005); Format(s): CD | 23 | 44,000 | |
| Rendezvous 2: "Perfect Love!" Original Song Book | Released: August 4, 1999; Label: BMG Funhouse (BVCS-27006); Format(s): CD | 34 | 18,000 | |
| Galileo Original Soundtrack | Released: November 21, 2007; Label: Universal Music (UUCH-1063); Format(s): CD | 20 | 34,000 | |
| Galileo+ | Released: June 26, 2013; Label: Universal Music (UUCH-1077); Format(s): CD, CD+DVD | 3 | 68,000 | |

== Singles ==
=== As lead artist ===
List of singles, with selected chart positions
| Title | Year | Peak chart positions | | | | Sales (JPN) | Certifications | Album |
| Title | Year | JPN Oricon | JPN Billboard Japan Hot 100 (Note: The Japan Hot 100 was established in February 2008.) (Note: Sources for chart positions are as follows: "Sō (New Love New World)", "Keshin", "Hatsukoi", "Hotaru", "Shōnen", "Sakura Zaka", "Kazoku ni Narō yo", "Ikiteru Ikiteku", "Game", "Beautiful Life", "Tanjōbi ni wa Mashiro na Yuri o", "Get the Groove", "Nando Demo Hana ga Saku yō ni Watashi o Ikiyō", and "I Am a Hero", "Kusunoki (Blowing in the Wind of 500 Years)", "Genkai", "Banyuinryoku", "Ryu", "Jupiter", "Kaikō") | TWN | TWN East Asian (Note: Positions taken from 2008 week 45 for "Sō (New Love New World)", 2011 week 37 for "Kazoku ni Narō yo/Fighting Pose", 2012 week 15 for "Ikiteru Ikiteku", 2012 week 42 for "Beautiful Life/Game", and 2013 week 15 "Tanjōbi ni wa Masshiro na Yuri o/Get the Groove") | Sales (JPN) | Certifications | Album |
|---|---|---|---|---|---|---|---|---|
| "Tsuioku no Ame no Naka" (追憶の雨の中; "In the Rain of Reminiscence") | 1990 | — | — | — | — | | | Dengon |
| "Access" | 1990 | — | — | — | — | | | Lion |
| "Kaze o Sagashiteru" (風をさがしてる; "Searching for the Wind") | 1991 | — | — | — | — | | | Lion |
| "Woh Wow" | 1991 | 89 | — | — | — | 3,500 | | Bros. |
| "Tada Boku ga Kawatta" (ただ僕がかわった; "It's Only Me That's Weird") | 1991 | 89 | — | — | — | 3,500 | | Bros. |
| "Good Night" | 1992 | 9 | — | — | — | 312,000 | | Boots |
| "Yakusoku no Oka" (約束の丘; "Hill of Promise") | 1992 | 15 | — | — | — | 92,000 | | Boots |
| "Melody" | 1993 | 5 | — | — | — | 593,000 | | Calling |
| "All My Loving" | 1993 | 2 | — | — | — | 577,000 | JPN (physical): Platinum | Calling |
| "Koibito" | 1993 | 2 | — | — | — | 577,000 | JPN (physical): Platinum | Calling |
| "It's Only Love" | 1994 | 1 | — | — | — | 1,176,000 | JPN (physical): Million | On and On |
| "Sorry Baby" | 1994 | 1 | — | — | — | 1,176,000 | JPN (physical): Million | On and On |
| "Hello" | 1995 | 1 | — | — | — | 1,871,000 | JPN (physical): Million; JPN (digital): Gold | M Collection: Kaze o Sagashiteru |
| "Message" | 1995 | 1 | — | — | — | 939,000 | JPN (physical): 2× Platinum | Non-album single |
| "Heart" | 1998 | 3 | — | — | — | 570,000 | JPN (physical): Platinum | Sing a Song |
| "You" | 1998 | 3 | — | — | — | 570,000 | JPN (physical): Platinum | Sing a Song |
| "Peach!!" | 1998 | 4 | — | — | — | 263,000 | JPN (physical): Gold | Magnum Collection 1999 "Dear" |
| "Heart of Xmas" | 1998 | 4 | — | — | — | 263,000 | JPN (physical): Gold | Magnum Collection 1999 "Dear" |
| "Heaven" | 1999 | 1 | — | — | — | 904,000 | JPN (physical): 2× Platinum | F |
| "Squall" | 1999 | 1 | — | — | — | 904,000 | JPN (digital): Gold | Magnum Collection 1999 "Dear" |
| "Sakura Zaka" | 2000 | 1 | 21 | — | — | 2,299,000 | JPN (physical): 2× Million; JPN (digital): Platinum | F |
| "Hey!" | 2000 | 1 | — | — | — | 353,000 | JPN (physical): Platinum | F |
| "Gang" | 2001 | 3 | — | — | — | 220,000 | JPN (physical): Gold | F |
| "Niji" | 2003 | 1 (Note: "Niji" re-released by itself as "Niji (Mō Hitotsu no Natsu)" in 2004, which reached number four on Oricon's single charts.) | — | — | — | 1,075,000 | JPN (physical, EP): Million; JPN (physical, "Niji (Mō Hitotsu no Natsu)"): Gold | 5 Nen Mono |
| "Himawari" | 2003 | 1 | — | — | — | 1,075,000 | JPN (physical, EP): Million; JPN (physical, "Niji (Mō Hitotsu no Natsu)"): Gold | 5 Nen Mono |
| "Sore ga Subete sa" | 2003 | 1 | — | — | — | 1,075,000 | JPN (physical, EP): Million; JPN (physical, "Niji (Mō Hitotsu no Natsu)"): Gold | 5 Nen Mono |
| "Naitari Shinaide" | 2004 | 1 | — | — | — | 197,000 | JPN (physical): Platinum | 5 Nen Mono |
| "Red x Blue" | 2004 | 1 | — | — | — | 197,000 | JPN (physical): Platinum | 5 Nen Mono |
| "Tokyo" | 2005 | 2 | — | — | — | 172,000 | JPN (physical): Platinum | 5 Nen Mono |
| "Milk Tea" | 2006 | 1 | — | — | — | 359,000 | JPN (physical): Platinum | 5 Nen Mono |
| "Utsukushiki Hana" | 2006 | 1 | — | — | — | 359,000 | JPN (physical): Platinum | 5 Nen Mono |
| "Tokyo ni mo Attanda" | 2007 | 2 | — | — | — | 140,000 | JPN (physical): Gold | Zankyō |
| "Muteki no Kimi" | 2007 | 2 | — | — | — | 140,000 | JPN (physical): Gold | Zankyō |
| "Sō (New Love New World)" | 2008 | 2 | 2 | — | 16 | 178,000 | JPN (physical): Gold; JPN (digital): Gold | Zankyō |
| "Keshin" | 2009 | 1 | 1 | — | — | 208,000 | JPN (physical): Gold; JPN (digital): Platinum | Zankyō |
| "Hatsukoi" | 2009 | 1 | 1 | — | — | 270,000 | JPN (physical): Platinum; JPN (digital): 2× Platinum; JPN (ringtone): 2× Platinum | The Best Bang!! |
| "Hotaru" | 2010 | 1 | 1 | — | — | 241,000 | JPN (physical): Platinum; JPN (digital): Platinum | The Best Bang!! |
| "Shōnen" | 2010 | 1 | 91 | — | — | 241,000 | JPN (digital): Gold | The Best Bang!! |
| "Kazoku ni Narō yo" (家族になろうよ; "Let's Be a Family") | 2011 | 1 | 1 | — | 9 | 321,000 | JPN (physical): Platinum; JPN (digital): Platinum | Human |
| "Fighting Pose" | 2011 | 1 | — | — | 9 | 321,000 | | Human |
| "Ikiteru Ikiteku" (生きてる生きてく; "Living, Starting to Live") | 2012 | 1 | 1 | 19 | 5 | 177,000 | JPN (physical): Gold; JPN (digital): Gold | Human |
| "Beautiful Life" | 2012 | 1 | 1 | — | 5 | 181,000 | JPN (physical): Gold; JPN (digital): Gold | Human |
| "Game" | 2012 | 1 | 16 | — | 5 | 181,000 | JPN (physical): Gold; JPN (digital): Gold | Human |
| "Tanjōbi ni wa Mashiro na Yuri o" (誕生日には真白な百合を; "A Pure White Lily on Your Birthday") | 2013 | 1 | 1 | — | 8 | 155,000 | JPN (physical): Gold; JPN (digital): Gold | Human |
| "Get the Groove" | 2013 | 1 | 70 | — | 8 | 155,000 | | Human |
| "Nando Demo Hana ga Saku yō ni Watashi o Ikiyō" (何度でも花が咲くように私を生きよう; "I'll Live Like a Flower, Blooming Again and Again") | 2015 | — | 3 | — | — | | JPN (digital): Gold | —N/a |
| "I Am a Hero" | 2015 | 1 | 2 | — | — | 187,000 | JPN (physical): Platinum | —N/a |
| "Kusunoki (Blowing in the Wind of 500 Years)" (クスノキ-500年の風に吹かれて-) | 2025 | — | 70 | — | — | | | —N/a |
| "Genkai" (幻界) | 2025 | — | 90 | — | — | | | —N/a |
| "Banyuinryoku" (万有引力) | 2025 | — | 78 | — | — | | | —N/a |
| "Ryu" (龍) | 2025 | — | 94 | — | — | | | —N/a |
| "Jupiter" (木星) (featuring Koshi Inaba) | 2025 | — | 20 | — | — | | | —N/a |
| "Kaikō" (邂逅) | 2026 | — | 43 | — | — | | | —N/a |
"—" denotes items which were released before the creation of the Billboard Japan Hot 100 or the creation of the G-Music charts, or items that did not chart.

=== Promotional singles ===
List of promotional singles, with selected chart positions
| Title | Year | Peak chart positions | | | Certifications | Album |
| Title | Year | Billboard Japan Hot 100 (Note: Sources for chart positions are as follows: "Gunjō (Ultramarine)", "Saiai", "Tabibito", "Kokoro Color", "Akatsuki" "Human", and "1461-nichi".) | RIAJ monthly ringtones (Note: The RIAJ "Reco-kyō" monthly ringtone chart is a deprecated chart that ran from 2006 until 2009.) (Note: Sources for chart positions are as follows: "Gunjō (Ultramarine)") | RIAJ Digital Track Chart (Note: The RIAJ Digital Track Chart is a depreciated chart that ran from 2009 until early 2012 and tracked full-length cellphone downloads.) (Note: Sources for chart positions are as follows: "Kokoro Color", "Saiai", and "Tabibito") | Certifications | Album |
|---|---|---|---|---|---|---|
| "Gunjō (Ultramarine)" (群青) | 2007 | — | 30 | — | | Zankyō |
| "Saiai" (最愛; "Beloved") | 2009 | 23 | — | 3 | JPN (digital): Platinum | Zankyō |
| "Tabibito" (旅人; "Traveler") | 2009 | 94 | — | 6 | | Zankyō |
| "Kokoro Color (A Song for the Wonderful Year)" (心color; "Heart Color") | 2010 | 7 | — | 13 | | The Best Bang!! |
| "Akatsuki" (暁; "Dawn") | 2014 | 11 | — | — | | Human |
| "Human" | 2014 | 38 | — | — | | Human |
| "1461-nichi" (1461日; "1461 Days") | 2016 | 44 | — | — | | —N/a |
"—" denotes items which were released before the creation of the Billboard Japan Hot 100 and/or the creation of the RIAJ charts.

=== Other charted songs ===
List of other charted songs
| Title | Year | Peak chart positions | Certifications | Album |
| Title | Year | RIAJ monthly ringtones (Note: Sources for chart positions are as follows: "Vs. (Chikaku to Kairaku no Rasen)", "Kakusei Moment", "Ashita no Show", "Higher Stage", and "Michishirube") | Certifications | Album |
|---|---|---|---|---|
| "Vs. (Chikaku to Kairaku no Rasen) (vs. ～知覚と快楽の螺旋～; "A Spiral of Senses and Pleasure") | 2007 | 8 | | Galileo: Original Soundtrack |
| "Kakusei Moment" (覚醒モーメント; "Awakening Moment") | 2007 | 41 | | Galileo: Original Soundtrack |
| "Ashita no Show" (明日の☆SHOW; "Tomorrow's Show") | 2008 | 35 | | "Sō (single)" / Zankyō |
| "Higher Stage" | 2008 | 27 | | "Sō (single)" / Zankyō |
| "Michishirube" (道標; "Sign Post") | 2011 | 87 | JPN (digital): Gold | "Keshin" (single) |
| "Genki o Dashite" (元気を出して) | 2015 | — (Note: "Genki o Dashite" charted at number 73 on the Japan Hot 100.) | | Tamashii Riku |

=== As featured artist ===
List of singles, with selected chart positions
| Title | Year | Peak chart positions | | Sales (JPN) | Certifications | Album |
| Title | Year | Oricon Singles Charts | Billboard Japan Hot 100 (Note: Sources for chart positions are as follows: "Kiss Shite", "Saiai", "Let's Try Again", and "Koi no Magic") | Sales (JPN) | Certifications | Album |
|---|---|---|---|---|---|---|
| "Tama ni wa Jibun o Homete Yarō" (たまには自分を褒めてやろう; "Lets Praise Ourselves Once in a While") (SION with Masaharu Fukuyama) | 2005 | 14 | — | 25,000 | | Tokyo Nocturne |
| "Wish" (Akira Inoue and M.I.H. Band) | 2006 | 4 | — | 48,000 | | Non-album single |
| "Kiss Shite" (KISSして; "Kissing") (as KOH+) | 2007 | 4 | 62 | 147,000 | JPN (physical): Gold; JPN (digital): 2× Platinum | Single Best |
| "Saiai" (as KOH+) | 2008 | 5 | 3 | 107,000 | JPN (physical): Gold; JPN (digital): 3× Platinum | Love Paranoia |
| "Let's Try Again" (as a part of Team Amuse) | 2011 | 2 | 2 | 314,000 | JPN (physical): Platinum | Non-album single |
| "Koi no Magic" (恋の魔力; "The Magic of Love") (as KOH+) | 2013 | — | 5 | | JPN (digital): Gold | Galileo+ |
"—" denotes items which were released before the creation of the Billboard Japan Hot 100 or those which didn't chart.

=== Other appearances ===
List of non-studio album or guest appearances that feature Masaharu Fukuyama
| Title | Year | Album |
|---|---|---|
| "Kaze no Lion" (風のライオン; "Wind Lion") (with Amii Ozaki) | 2001 | Amii-Phonic |
| "Oyome ni Oide" (お嫁においで; "Be My Bride") (with Amii Ozaki) | 2003 | Horizon: Kayama Yuzo Cover Songs |
| "Nostalgia" | 2003 | Okamoto Osami Acoustic Party with Yoshikawa Chūei |
| "Kaerenai Futari" (帰れない二人; "Us Who Can't Go Back") (with Shuichi "Ponta" Murakami) | 2003 | My Pleasure |
| "Cosmos" (秋桜, Kosumosu) | 2004 | Momoe Yamaguchi Tribute: Thank You For... |
| "Fight (2006 Mix)" | 2006 | Genki Desu ka |
| "Blues" (with Shuichi "Ponta" Murakami) | 2006 | Utapon |
| "Tokyo Boogie-Woogie" | 2007 | Hattori Ryōichi: Tanjō Shūnen Kinen Tribute Album |
| "Ruby no Yubi wa" | 2010 | Matsumoto Takashi ni Sasagu: Kazemachi DNA |
| "After '45" (Ryo Ishibashi with Masaharu Fukuyama) | 2011 | Hyōgen-sha |

== Videography ==
=== Video albums ===
List of media, with selected chart positions
| Title | Album details | Peak positions |
| Title | Album details | JPN |
|---|---|---|
| Bros. | Released: January 21, 1992; Label: BMG; Format(s): DVD, LD, VHS | 48 |
| Start | Released: June 2, 1993; Label: BMG; Format(s): DVD, LD, VHS | 46 |
| Fukuyamania | Released: February 6, 1999; Label: BMG; Format(s): DVD, LD, VHS | 39 |
| Fukuyama Masaharu Eggs Live: Osaka Dome/Club Eggsite | Released: December 12, 2001; Label: BMG; Format(s): DVD, LD, VHS | 6 |
| Aa, Daikanshasai!! (嗚呼、大感謝祭!!; "Oh, Great Thanksgiving Day") | Released: March 26, 2003; Label: BMG; Format(s): DVD | 2 |
| Masaharu Fukuyama 15th Anniversary Special DVD Box: Mata Aō! Mata Yarō na! (また逢おう!またやろうな!; "Let's Meet Again! Let's Do It Again!") | Released: December 14, 2005; Label: BMG; Format(s): DVD | 4 |
| We're Bros. Tour 2007 Live DVD Special Box "17nen Mono" | Released: October 24, 2007; Label: BMG; Format(s): DVD | 3 |
| Masaharu Fukuyama 20th Anniversary We're Bros. Tour 2009 Michishirube (道標; "Sign Post") | Released: April 28, 2010; Label: Universal; Format(s): DVD | 2 |
| Fukuyama Natsu no Daisōgyōsai Inasayama (福山☆夏の大創業祭 稲佐山; "Fukuyama's Summer Grand Opening Party in Inasayama") | Released: April 28, 2010; Label: Universal; Format(s): DVD | 3 |
| We're Bros. Tour 2007 "17nen Mono" | Released: June 30, 2010; Label: Universal; Format(s): DVD | 13 |
| 15th Anniversary We're Bros. Freedom Tour 2005: Kaze (風; "Wind") | Released: June 30, 2010; Label: Format(s): DVD | 22 |
| We're Bros. Tour '98: Like a Hurricane | Released: June 30, 2010; Label: Format(s): DVD | 35 |
| 10th Anniversary We're Bros. Tour Magnum Collection 2000 | Released: June 30, 2010; Label: Format(s): DVD | 31 |
| Fukuyama Fuyu no Daikanshasai Sono San: Yokohama Amaguriteki Yakai/Yokohama Marontic Night (福山☆冬の大感謝祭 其の三 ～横浜甘栗的夜会/ヨコハマ・マロンチックナイト～; "Fukuyama's Winter Thanksgiving Party Three: Yokohama Marontic Night") | Released: June 30, 2010; Label: Format(s): DVD | 33 |
| Fukuyama Fuyu no Daikanshasai Sono Shi: Otoko mo Onna mo Pashipashi Fikofiko! Akogiiro no Fuyuyasumi (福山☆冬の大感謝祭 其の四 ～♂も♀もパシパシ フィコフィコ! アコギ色の冬休み～) | Released: June 30, 2010; Label: Format(s): DVD | 36 |
| Aa, Dai Kanshasai!! (嗚呼、大感謝祭!!) | Released: June 30, 2010; Label: Format(s): DVD | 21 |
| Masaharu Fukuyama We're Bros. Tour 2011 The Live Bang!! | Released: June 27, 2012; Label: Format(s): DVD | 1 |
| Fukuyama Manatsu no Shotaiken The Live Bang!! in Okinawa (福山☆真夏の初体験 THE LIVE BANG!! in 沖縄) | Released: June 27, 2012; Label: Format(s): DVD | 3 |
| Fukuyama Fuyu no Dai Kanshasai Sono Jūichi Hajimete no Anata, Daijōbu Desu ka? Jōren no Anata, Omataseshimashita: Hontō ni Yatchaimasu! "Mu Hayariuta-sai" (福山☆冬の大感謝祭 其の十一 初めてのあなた、大丈夫ですか？常連のあなた、お待たせしました♡ 本当にやっちゃいます！『無流行歌祭!!』) | Released: June 27, 2012; Label: Format(s): DVD | 2 |
| Fukuyama Fuyu no Dai Kanshasai Sono Jūnishijōsai Dai no 10 Days!! Hotel de Fukuyama: Omae to Game Suru Beautiful Life na Tōkakan (福山☆冬の大感謝祭 其の十二 史上最大の10DAYS!! Hotel de 福山 〜お前とGAMEするBeautiful liveな十日間♡〜) | Released: June 26, 2013; Label: Format(s): DVD | 5 |
| Fukuyama Masaharu We're Bros. Tour 2014 Human | Released: April 8, 2015; Label: Amuse; Format(s): DVD, Blu-ray | 3 |
