= The Best Bang!! =

Greatest hits album by Masaharu Fukuyama
- Released: November 17, 2010
- Recorded: 1990–2010
- Genre: Rock
- Length: 3:39:11; 4:07:32 (limited edition)
- Language: Japanese
- Label: Universal
- Producer: Masaharu Fukuyama

Masaharu Fukuyama chronology
Zankyō (2009)	The Best Bang!! (2010)	Human (2014)

CD+DVD edition covers
- Front cover, with Fukuyama aged 19

Alternative cover
- Back cover, with Fukuyama aged 41

Singles from The Best Bang!!
- 1. "Hatsukoi" Released: December 16, 2009; 2. "Hotaru/Shōnen" Released: August 11, 2010; 3. "Kokoro Color (A Song for the Wonderful Year)" Released: November 10, 2010 (digital single)

The Best Bang!! (stylized as THE BEST BANG!!) is Japanese rock singer-songwriter Masaharu Fukuyama's fourth compilation album, released on November 17, 2010. The compilation was an all-time greatest hits album, featuring Fukuyama's songs from both his time with record labels BMG Japan and Universal Music Japan.

The album was released in other Asian territories in March and April 2011. The album was re-released in Japan in April with an added disc, titled the Asia Limited Bang!! version, featuring With Special Guests: Fukuyama Masaharu Remake, a tribute album performed by South Korean musicians, sung in Korean. The tribute album was also released separately in territories outside Japan.

== Background and development ==
The compilation is a collection to celebrate Fukuyama's 20th anniversary since his debut as a musician in 1990. The album features material from 1990 through to 2010, spanning two record labels. Fukuyama personally chose the songs to appear on the album.

The compilation also featured new songs, such as the singles "Hatsukoi" and "Hotaru/Shōnen," and a single for the song "Kokoro Color (A Song for the Wonderful Year)" featuring three completely unpublished songs. On the limited edition CD+DVD version of the album, six instrumental compositions were added to the third disc, including the unpublished "Denderaryūba," which was performed at Fukuyama's 20th anniversary We're Bros. tour.

Three versions of the album were released: a CD+DVD limited-edition version, a version limited to 15,000 copies that came with a special towel and a regular version. The DVD featured eight songs' music videos, including "Kokoro Color (A Song for the Wonderful Year)."

== Cover artwork ==
The cover artwork to the regular and special goods version of the album features a collage of 44 different pictures of Fukuyama, from infancy through to 2010. The CD+DVD version, however, features a photo taken in 1988 at 19, before Fukuyama's debut as a singer. The reverse side of the album features a 2010 recreation of the photo, with Fukuyama at age 41.

== Chart reception ==
The album debuted on its first day at number one on Oricon's albums charts, debuting at number one for the week, with 381,000 copies sold. This became his 8th number one album, and was the highest sales for a solo vocalist in Japan for 2010, as well as the highest sales for an album by a male soloist in five years, since Ken Hirai's Ken Hirai 10th Anniversary Complete Single Collection '95—'05 "Utabaka". Despite being released in November, The Best Bang!! was the 9th best sold album in 2010 in Japan. The Recording Industry Association of Japan (RIAJ) have certified the album as double platinum for a shipment of more than 500,000 copies.

The additional single "Kokoro Color (A Song for the Wonderful Year)" was released digitally as a full-length cellphone download a week before the album on November 10. The song was promoted heavily on radio for two weeks, peaking at number 7 on Billboard Japan Hot 100. The song reached number 13 on the RIAJ Digital Track Chart.

== Track listing ==
All versions of the album

All songs written and composed by Masaharu Fukuyama, except "Tsuioku no Ame no Naka" which features additional music written with Hideo Sano, "Peach!!" which features music co-written with Motohiro Tomita and "Ishikure no Pride" which features lyrics by Sion.

Disc 1
No.	Title	Arranger(s)	Length
1.	"Tsuioku no Ame no Naka" (追憶の雨の中 "In the Rain of Reminiscence," from Dengon)	Hisashi Shirahama	3:56
2.	"Nigerarenai" (逃げられない "I Can't Run Away," from Lion)	Syuji Nakamura	4:15
3.	"Yakusoku no Oka" (約束の丘 "Primose Hill," from Boots)	Katsu Hoshi	5:27
4.	"Hard Rain" (from Boots)	Nakamura	4:41
5.	"Good Night" (from Boots)	Akihiko Matsumoto	5:54
6.	"Melody" (from Calling)	Makoto Saitō	4:29
7.	"All My Loving" (from Calling)	Rei Ohara	4:05
8.	"Tōku e" (遠くへ "To Far Away," from Calling)	Katsu Hoshi	5:07
9.	"Koibito" (from Calling)	Katsu Hoshi	4:41
10.	"Marcy's Song" (from Calling)	Yoshiyuki Sahashi	4:32
11.	"It's Only Love" (from On and On)	Saitō	4:35
12.	"Hello" (from M Collection)	Sahashi	3:59
13.	"Good Luck" (from Calling)	Saitō	4:43
14.	"Message"	Saitō	4:11
15.	"Heart" (from Sing a Song)	Fukuyama	4:48
16.	"You" (from Sing a Song)	Motohiro Tomita	4:45
Total length:			67:04

Disc 2
No.	Title	Arranger(s)	Length
1.	"Heaven" (from F)	Sahashi	3:39
2.	"Peach!!" (from Dear)	Tomita	4:03
3.	"Squall" (from Dear)	Tomita	5:24
4.	"Gang" (from F)	Tomita	4:13
5.	"Sakura Zaka" (from F)	Tomita	4:57
6.	"Mikan-iro no Natsu Yasumi" (蜜柑色の夏休み "Mandarin-colored Summer Holiday," from F)	Sahashi	4:03
7.	"Niji" (from 5 Nen Mono)	Fukuyama	4:08
8.	"Himawari" (from 5 Nen Mono)	Akira Inoue	6:13
9.	"Sore ga Subete sa" (from 5 Nen Mono)	Inoue	5:10
10.	"Naitari Shinaide" (from 5 Nen Mono)	Takayuki Hattori	4:26
11.	"Red x Blue" (from 5 Nen Mono)	Fukuyama	4:32
12.	"Ano Natsu mo Umi mo Sora mo" (あの夏も 海も 空も "That Summer, and Sea, and Sky," from 5 Nen Mono)	Inoue	5:26
13.	"Milk Tea" (from 5 Nen Mono)	Fukuyama, Inoue	5:01
14.	"Tokyo ni mo Attanda" (from Zankyō)	Fukuyama, Hattori	6:18
Total length:			67:52

Disc 3
No.	Title	Arranger(s)	Length
1.	"The Edge of Chaos (Ai no Ichigeki)" (愛の一撃 "Love Punch," from Zankyō)	Fukuyama, Inoue	3:23
2.	"Ashita no Show" (明日の☆SHOW "Tomorrow's Show," from Zankyō)	Fukuyama, Inoue	4:51
3.	"Saiai" (最愛 "Beloved," from Zankyō)	Fukuyama, Inoue	5:41
4.	"Sō (New Love New World)" (最愛 "Beloved," from Zankyō)	Fukuyama, Inoue	4:42
5.	"Keshin" (from Zankyō)	Fukuyama, Inoue	5:02
6.	"Hatsukoi"	Fukuyama, Inoue	5:10
7.	"Kiss Shite" (from "Keshin" (single))	Fukuyama, Inoue	3:42
8.	"Shōnen"	Fukuyama, Inoue	5:03
9.	"Hotaru"	Fukuyama, Inoue	5:12
10.	"Gunjō (Ultramarine)" (群青, from Zankyō)	Fukuyama, Inoue	5:01
Total length:			47:47

Disc 3 limited edition bonus tracks
No.	Title	Arranger(s)	Length
11.	"Vs. (Chikaku to Kairaku no Rasen)" (vs. ～知覚と快楽の螺旋～ "Versus (A Spiral of Senses and Pleasure)," from Galileo Original Soundtrack)	Fukuyama, Inoue	3:48
12.	"Kakusei Moment" (覚醒モーメント "Awakening Moment," from Galileo Original Soundtrack)	Fukuyama, Inoue	4:34
13.	"Denderaryūba" (でんでらりゅうば "If I Could Come Out, I Will Come Out")	Fukuyama, Inoue	4:31
14.	"99" (from Zankyō)	Fukuyama, Inoue	5:15
15.	"Revolution//Evolution" (from "Hotaru/Shōnen" (single))	Fukuyama, Inoue	5:11
16.	"Ammonite no Yume" (アンモナイトの夢 "Ammonite Dreams," from "Hatsukoi" (single))	Fukuyama, Inoue	4:34
Total length:			79:36

Disc 4: single (original Japanese press only)
No.	Title	Arranger(s)	Length
1.	"Kokoro Color (A Song for the Wonderful Year)" (心color "Heart Color")	Fukuyama, Inoue	4:53
2.	"Ishikure no Pride" (石塊のプライド "Pebble Pride")	Fukuyama, Inoue	4:36
3.	"Michishirube 2010" (道標 2010 "Signpost 2010")	Fukuyama, Inoue	5:22
4.	"Kokoro Color (A Song for the Wonderful Year) (Original Karaoke)"	Fukuyama, Inoue	4:53
5.	"Ishikure no Pride (Original Karaoke)"	Fukuyama, Inoue	4:36
6.	"Michishirube 2010 (Original Karaoke)"	Fukuyama, Inoue	5:22
Total length:			29:42

Disc 4: With Special Guests: Fukuyama Masaharu Remake (Asia Limited Bang!! version)
No.	Title	Artist	Length
1.	"Niji"	Beast
2.	"Hotaru"	Tei
3.	"Himawari"	Lim Jeong Hee
4.	"Saiai"	2AM
5.	"Milk Tea"	G.NA
6.	"Gunjō (Ultramarine)"	Ban Kwang-Ok
7.	"Koibito"	Joo Hee
8.	"Hatsukoi"	Young Gee

== Chart rankings ==
Chart (2010)	Peak position
Oricon daily albums	1
Oricon weekly albums	1
Oricon monthly albums	2
Oricon yearly albums	9

=== Sales and certifications ===
Chart	Amount
Oricon physical sales	662,000
RIAJ physical shipping certification	Triple platinum (750,000+)

== Release history ==
Region	Date	Format	Distributing Label
Japan	November 17, 2010	CD, digital download	Universal Music Japan
Japan	December 4, 2010	Rental CD	Universal Music Japan
Taiwan	March 23, 2011	CD	Universal Taiwan
Hong Kong	March 24, 2011	CD	Universal Hong Kong
South Korea	March 29, 2011	CD	Sony Music Korea
Thailand	April 1, 2011	CD	Universal
Japan	April 13, 2011	Asia Limited Bang!!: CD, digital download	Universal Music Japan
