= Magnum Collection 1999 "Dear" =

Greatest hits album by Masaharu Fukuyama
- Released: December 8, 1999
- Genre: J-pop
- Length: 2:07:57
- Label: BMG Japan

Masaharu Fukuyama chronology
Sing a Song (1998)	Magnum Collection 1999 "Dear" (2009)	Fukuyama Presents Magnum Classics: Kissin' in the Holy Night (2000)

Magnum Collection 1999 "Dear" (stylized as MAGNUM COLLECTION 1999 "Dear") is Japanese singer-songwriter Masaharu Fukuyama's second compilation album, released on December 8, 1999. The album debuted at the top of the Oricon chart with sales of 373,790. This is currently the best-selling album by the artist.

== Track listing ==
Disc 1
No.	Title	Arranger(s)	Length
1.	"Tsuioku no Ame no Naka" (追憶の雨の中)	Hisashi Shirahama	3:56
2.	"Kaze Wo Sagashiteru" (風をさがしてる)	Syuji Nakamura	4:41
3.	"Tada Boku ga Kawatta" (ただ僕がかわった)	Katsu Hoshi	5:26
4.	"Good Night"	Akihiko Matsumoto	5:55
5.	"Yakusoku no Oka" (約束の丘)	Akihiko Matsumoto	5:25
6.	"Melody"	Makoto Saitō	4:30
7.	"Koibito" (恋人)	Yoshiyuki Sahashi	4:39
8.	"Tooku he" (遠くへ)	Katsu Hoshi	5:05
9.	"Marcy's Song"	Yoshiyuki Sahashi	4:33
10.	"It's Only Love"	Makoto Saito	4:34
11.	"1985 Nen Factory Street Natsu" (1985年 Factory Street 夏)	Rei Ohara	3:42
12.	"GLOAMING WAY"	Rei Ohara	4:42
13.	"Asu he no March" (明日へのマーチ)	Rei Ohara	4:13
14.	"Dear"	Rei Ohara	4:10

Disc 2
No.	Title	Arranger(s)	Length
1.	"HELLO" (Yoshiyuki Sahashi)	Sahashi	4:00
2.	"Message"	Makoto Saito	4:11
3.	"Ima Kono Hitotoki ga Tooi Yume no You ni" (今このひとときが遠い夢のように)	Char	4:35
4.	"Heart"	Fukuyama Masaharu	4:52
5.	"You"	Tomita Motohiro	4:43
6.	"Like A Hurricane"	Akihiko Matsumoto	4:45
7.	"Makimodoshita Natsu" (巻き戻した夏)	Akihiko Matsumoto	4:45
8.	"Peach!!"	Fukuyama Masaharu	4:03
9.	"Squall"	Tomita Motohiro	5:21
10.	"DEAD BODY (Live/'95 Style)"	Hisashi Shirahama	3:42
11.	"BLOOD (Live/'95 Style)"	Shirahama Hisashi	5:44
12.	"Good Luck (Live/'95 Style)"	Rei Ohara	5:42
13.	"SORRY BABY (Live/'98 Style)"	Rei Ohara	6:28
14.	"Motto Soba ni Kite (Santa Monica Blvd./'99 Style)" (もっとそばにきて)	Rei Ohara	6:18

Disc 1 track 1 from the album Dengon, track 2 from the album Lion, track 3 from the album Bros, tracks 4 and 5 from the album Boots, tracks 6 and 7 from the album Calling, track 10 from the album On and On. Disc 2 track 1 from the album M Collection, track 4 and 5 from the album Sing a Song, track 8 and 9 from the album Dear, track 13 from the album On and On.

== Charts ==
Chart (2010)	Peak position
Oricon daily albums	1
Oricon weekly albums	1
Oricon monthly albums	2
Oricon yearly albums	9
