= Tokyo (Masaharu Fukuyama song) =

Single by Masaharu Fukuyama

from the album 5 Nen Mono
- A-side: "Tokyo"
- B-side: "Watashiha Kaze Ninaru"
- Released: 17 August 2005
- Genre: J-pop
- Length: 20:44
- Label: Universal
- Songwriter(s): Masaharu Fukuyama
- Producer(s): Masaharu Fukuyama; Goofy Mori

Masaharu Fukuyama singles chronology
"Naitari Shinaide/Red x Blue" (2004)	"Tokyo" (2005)	"milk tea/Utsukusiki Hana" (2006)

"Tokyo" is the twentieth single by Japanese artist Masaharu Fukuyama. It was released on 17 August 2005.

== Track listing ==
=== Limited Edition CD ===
1. Tokyo
2. Watashiha Kaze Ninaru
3. Tokyo (Original Karaoke)
4. Watashiha Kaze Ninaru (Original Karaoke)

=== Limited Edition DVD ===
1. Tokyo (Image clip)

=== Normal Edition CD ===
1. Tokyo
2. Watashiha Kaze Ninaru
3. Tokyo (Original Karaoke)
4. Watashiha Kaze Ninaru (Original Karaoke)

== Oricon sales chart (Japan) ==
Release	Chart	Peak position	First week sales	Sales total
17 August 2005	Oricon Daily Singles Chart	2		
17 August 2005	Oricon Weekly Singles Chart	2	102,240	171,000
17 August 2005	Oricon Monthly Singles Chart	3		
17 August 2005	Oricon Yearly Singles Chart	57		
