= Hey! (Masaharu Fukuyama song) =

2000 single by Masaharu Fukuyama

Single by Masaharu Fukuyama

from the album f
- B-side: "Ieji"
- Released: October 12, 2000
- Genre: J-pop
- Length: 29:47
- Songwriter(s): Masaharu Fukuyama

Masaharu Fukuyama singles chronology
"Sakura Zaka" (2000)	"Hey!" (2000)	"Gang" (2001)

"Hey!" is the sixteenth single released by Japanese artist Masaharu Fukuyama. It reached number-one on the Oricon Charts with 187,140 sold in its first week. It was released on October 12, 2000.

== Track listing ==
1. Hey!
2. Ieji (家路)
3. Hey! (The victory run)
4. Ieji (Putting on the laurel crown)
5. Hey! (original karaoke)
6. Ieji (original karaoke)

== Oricon sales chart (Japan) ==
Release	Chart	Peak position	First week sales
12 October 2000	Oricon Daily Singles Chart	1	
12 October 2000	Oricon Weekly Singles Chart	1	187,140
