= Sannō Shrine =

Shinto shrine in Nagasaki, Japan

Sannō Shrine (山王神社)
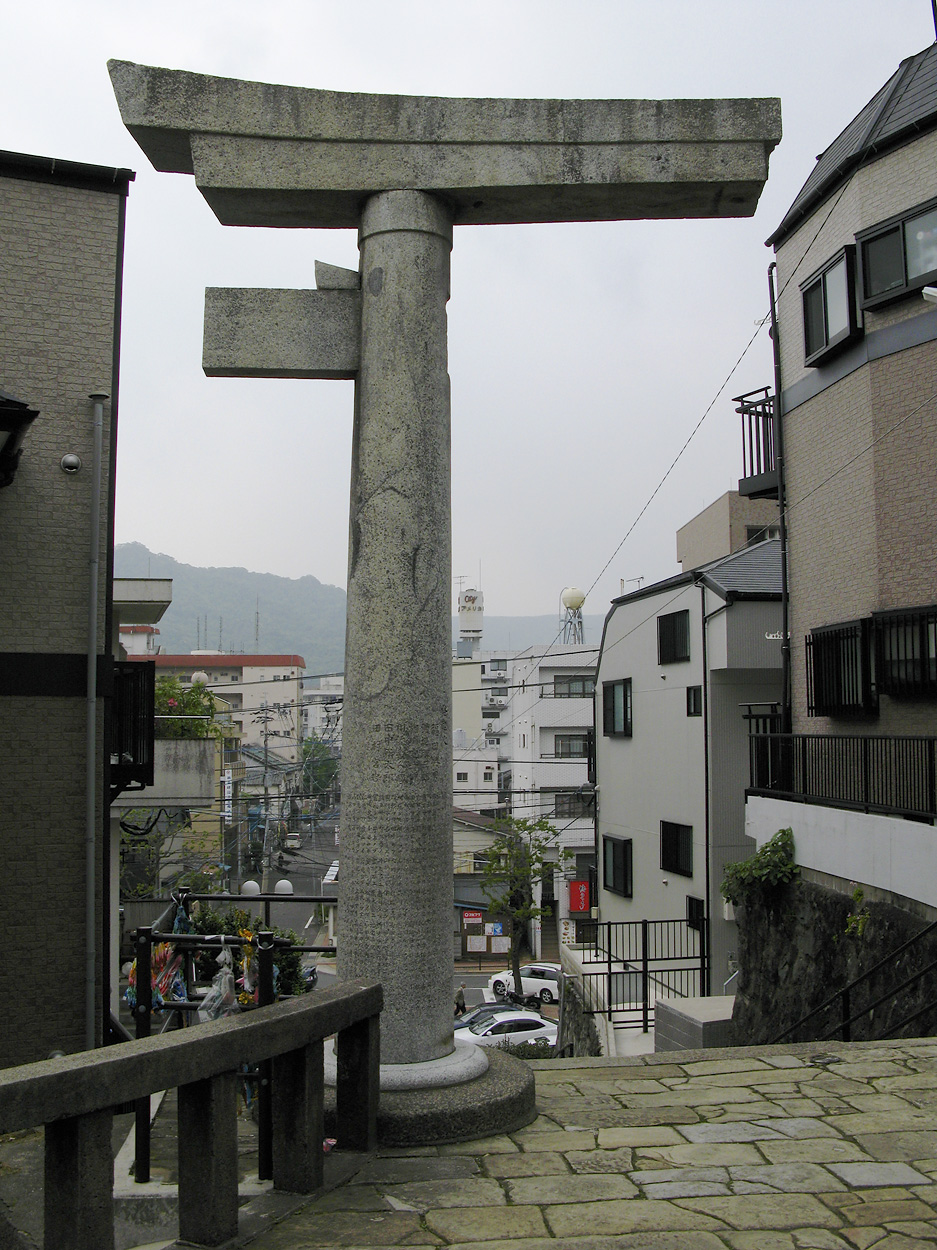
- The one-legged torii at the Sannō Shrine

- Location within Japan

Religion
- Affiliation: Shinto

Location
- Coordinates: 32°46′03″N 129°52′07″E

The Sannō Shrine (山王神社, Sannō Jinja; literally Mountain king shrine), located about 800 metres south-east of the atomic bomb hypocentre in Nagasaki, is noted for its one-legged stone torii at the shrine entrance.

== Torii ==
The well-known one-legged torii or one-legged arch (一本柱鳥居) was a result of the atomic bomb blast on August 9, 1945.

The epicenter of the bomb's destructive force was located approximately 800 meters from the shrine.

One support column was knocked down; but the other somehow remained standing, keeping the gate upright but effectively breaking it in half. The force of the shockwave rotated the torii about 30 degrees on its pedestal base. The central part of the shrine is located just behind the photographer of the image on the right.

== Trees ==
The surviving trees of Sannō Shrine have become another living demonstration of destruction and re-growth. Two large camphor trees were scorched, burned and stripped of all leaves by the bomb's shock wave; and yet, despite everything, the trees survived. One tree in Nagasaki was designated a natural monument on February 15, 1969.

The dead parts of the living trees have been enveloped by new growth.

The J-pop singer and actor Fukuyama Masaharu, who was born in Nagasaki to survivors of the atomic bomb, wrote his song "Kusunoki" (クスノキ) (from his 2014 album Human) about these trees. Fukuyama used the song to solicit donations which the city of Nagasaki used to establish the Kusunoki Foundation, dedicated to preserving the city's atomic bombed trees and teaching the history associated with them.

== Gallery ==
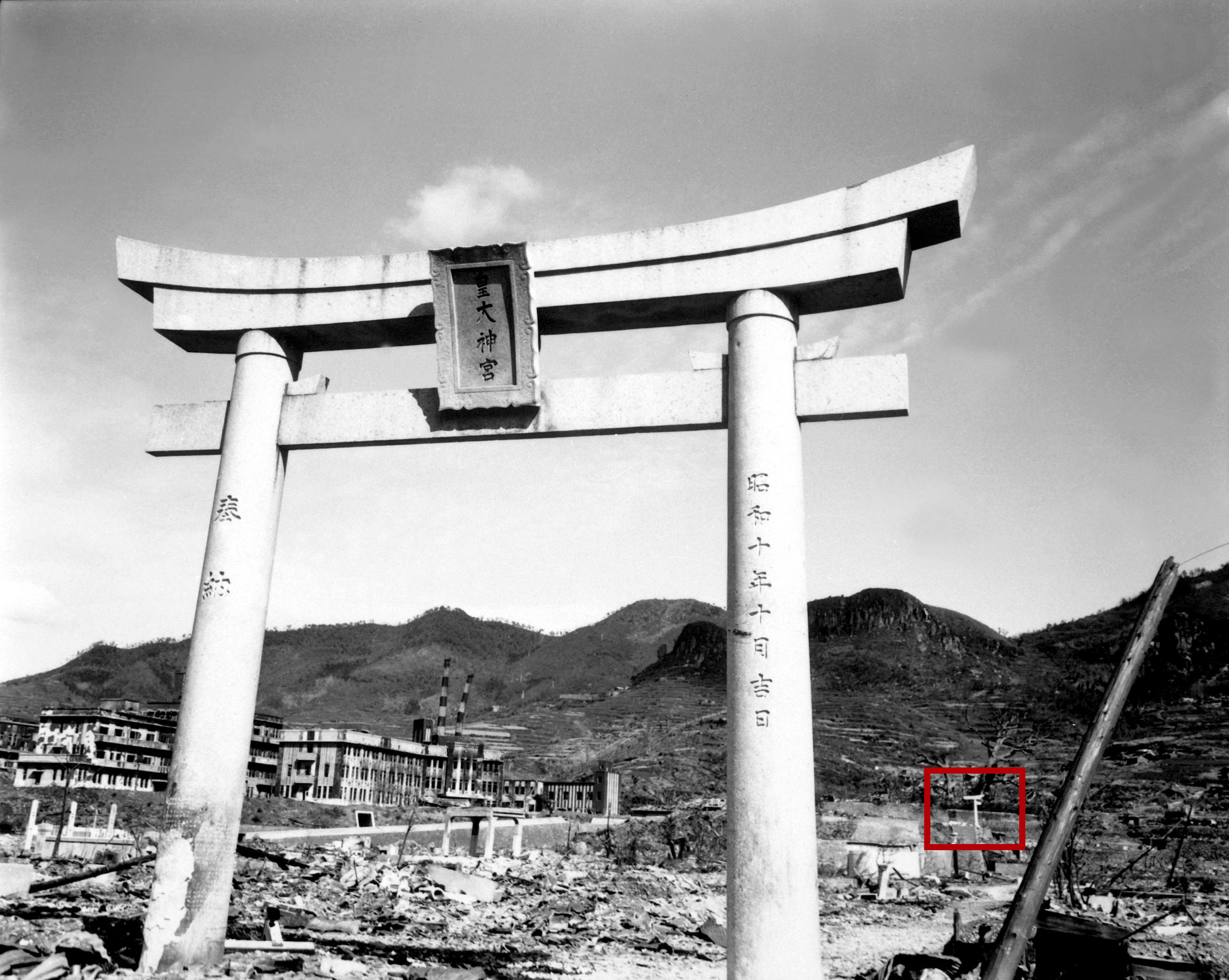
The one-legged torii of Sannō Shrine is circled in red. In the foreground is the shrine's first torii, which survived the bombing relatively undamaged.

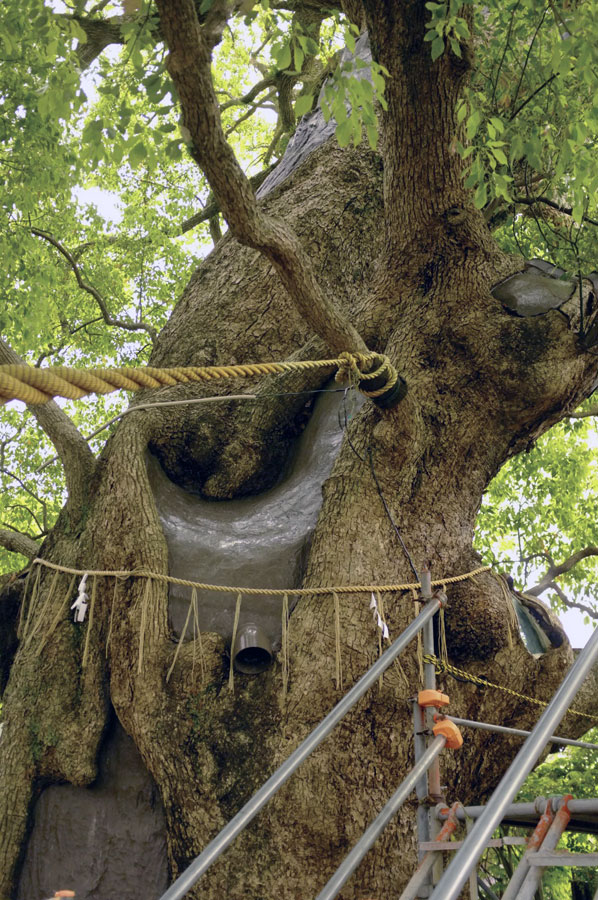
Camphor Tree Sannō Shinto Shrine Nagasaki, 2014

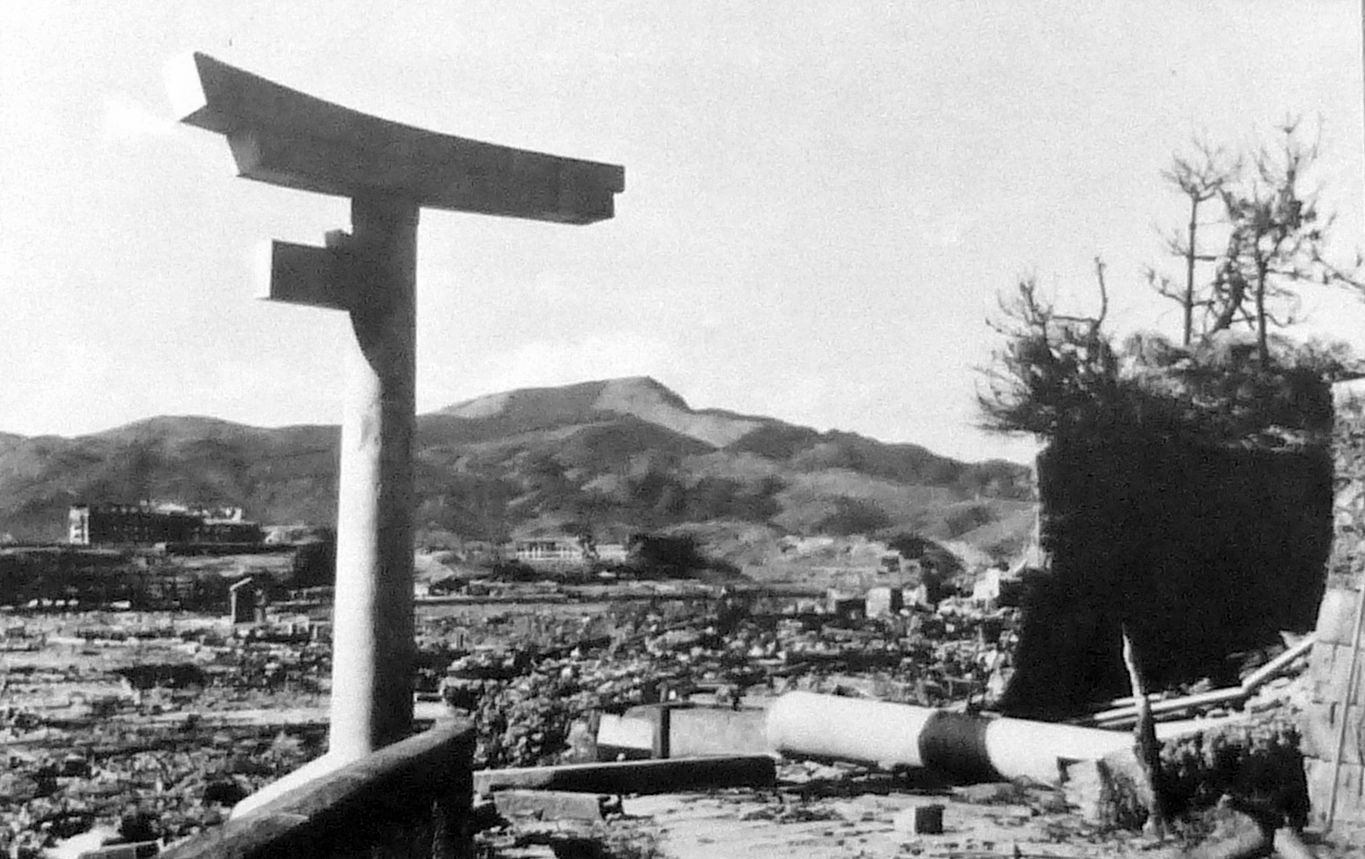
The one-legged torii and rubble after the atomic blast, 1945

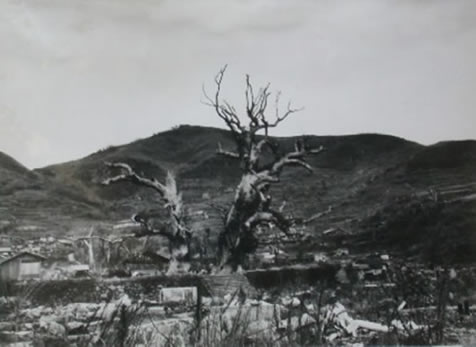
The devastated Sannō camphor trees, 1945

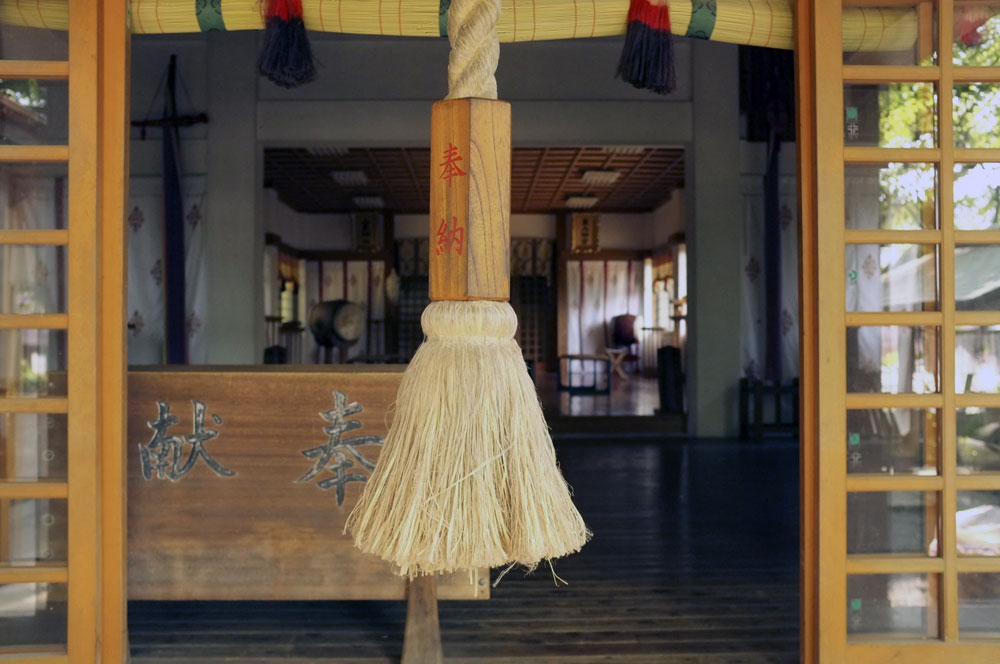
View of entrance to the Shrine in 2014

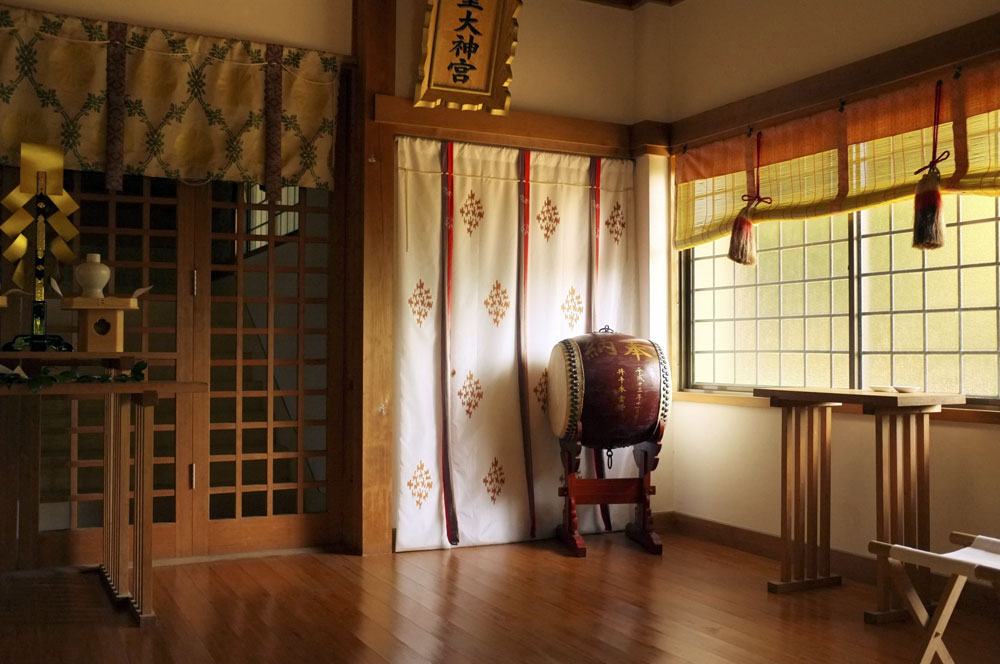
View of the Shrine interior in 2014
