= Hibakujumoku =

Tree that survived the 1945 atomic bombings of Japan

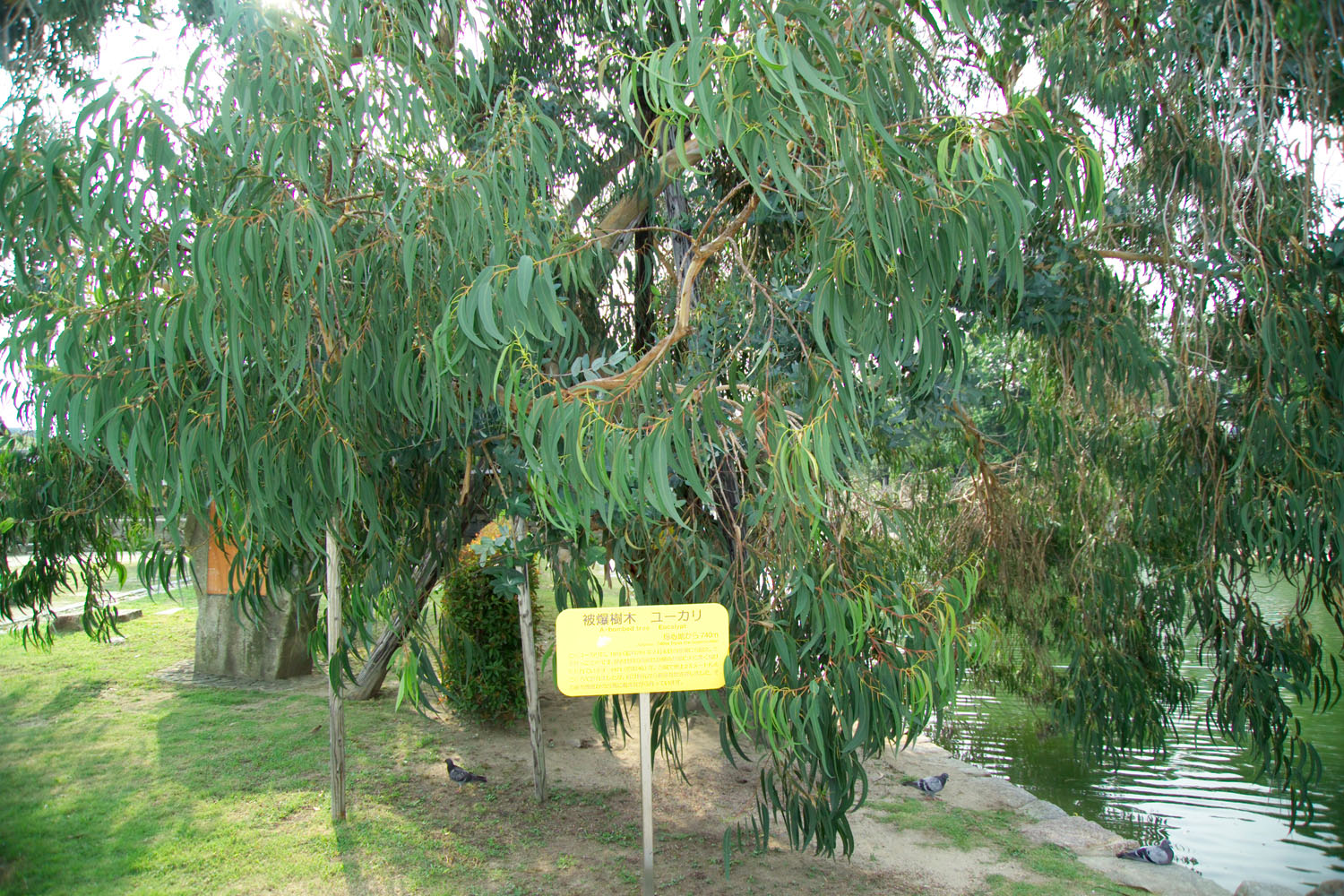
A Eucalyptus bicostata tree at the site of Hiroshima Castle, 740 m from the hypocenter. The tree survived the atomic bombing, while the castle was destroyed.

Hibakujumoku (Japanese: 被爆樹木; also called survivor tree or A-bombed tree in English) is a Japanese term for a tree that survived the atomic bombings of Hiroshima and Nagasaki in 1945. The term is from Japanese: 被爆, romanized: hibaku, lit. 'bombed, A-bombed, nuked' and Japanese: 樹木, romanized: jumoku, lit. 'trees and shrubs'.

== Damage ==
The heat emitted by the explosion in Hiroshima within the first three seconds at a distance of three kilometres from the hypocenter was about 40 times greater than that from the Sun. The initial radiation level at the hypocenter was approximately 240 Gy. According to Hiroshima and Nagasaki: The Physical, Medical, and Social Effects of the Atomic Bombings, plants suffered damage only in the portions exposed above ground, while portions underground were not directly damaged.

== Surviving trees in Hiroshima ==
In 2011, the United Nations Institute for Training and Research (UNITAR) in Hiroshima published a report and database detailing the surviving trees in that city. The closest tree, 370m from ground zero of the blast (34.3955° N, 132.4536° E), is a Weeping Willow (シダレヤナギ) on the Motomachi riverbank of the Ōta River. The tree fell at the time of the bombing, but new buds sprouted from the roots. The second closest tree is a Kurogane holly (クロガネモチ) 410m from the hypocenter, which burned down during the bombing, leaving only a stump, but miraculously sprouted in 1949.. In all, in 2011 there were 12 survivor trees within 1000m of the blast, and 48 within 2000m.

== Regeneration ==
The rate of regeneration differed by species. Active regeneration was shown by broad-leaved trees. Approximately 170 trees that grew in Hiroshima in 2011 had actually been there prior to the bombing. The oleander was designated the official flower of Hiroshima for its remarkable vitality.

== Types of hibakujumoku ==
Hibakujumoku species are listed in the UNITAR database, shown below, combined with data from Hiroshima and Nagasaki: The Physical, Medical, and Social Effects of the Atomic Bombings. A more extensive list, including distance from the hypocenter for each tree, is available in Survivors: The A-bombed Trees of Hiroshima.

=== List ===
Common name	Binomial name
Weeping willow	Salix babylonica
Black locust	Robinia pseudoacacia
Chinaberry	Melia azedarach var. japonica
Fig tree	Ficus sp.
Bamboo	Bambuseae tribe
Azalea	Genus Rhododendron
Hemp palm	Trachycarpus fortunei
Oleander	Nerium indicum
Japanese spindle	Euonymus japonicus
Kurogane holly	Ilex rotunda
Japanese aralia	Fatsia japonica
Nettle tree	Celtis sinensis var. japonica
Camphor tree	Cinnamomum camphora
Silverthorn	Elaeagnus pungens
Japanese persimmon	Diospyros kaki
Eucalypt	Eucalyptus bicostata
Giant pussy willow	Salix chaenomeloides
Southern catalpa	Catalpa bignonioides
Sago palm	Cycas revoluta
Tree peony	Paeonia suffruticosa
Shirodamo	Neolitsea sericea
Cherry tree	Prunus × yedoensis
Crape myrtle	Lagerstroemia indica
Ginkgo	Ginkgo biloba
Oriental plane	Platanus orientalis
Chinese parasol tree	Firmiana simplex
Japanese black pine	Pinus thunbergii
Muku tree	Aphananthe aspera
Japanese hackberry	Celtis jessoensis
Jujube	Ziziphus jujuba
Japanese apricot	Prunus mume var. purpurea
Amanatsu	Citrus natsudaidai
Tabunoki	Machilus thunbergii
Bohdi tree	Tilia miqueliana
Japanese camellia	Camellia japonica
Japanese quince	Chaenomeles speciosa
Chinese juniper	Juniperus chinensis
Crinum lily	Crinum asiaticum var. japonicum

== Surviving trees in Nagasaki ==
Although not as well known as the hibakujumoku in Hiroshima, there are a number of similar survivors in the vicinity of the hypocenter in Nagasaki. Approximately 50 of these trees have been documented in English.

The J-pop singer and actor Fukuyama Masaharu, who was born in Nagasaki to survivors of the atomic bomb, has been active in preserving Nagasaki's hibakujumoku. His song "Kusunoki" (クスノキ), from his 2014 album Human, honours the camphor trees of Sannō Shrine. Fukuyama used the song to solicit donations which the city of Nagasaki used to establish the Kusunoki Foundation, dedicated to preserving the trees and teaching the history associated with them.

== See also ==
- Hibakusha, humans that survived the atomic bombs
- List of individual trees
- Ákos Nagy - Hibaku Jumoku - The trees of Hiroshima [被爆樹木]
