= Gang (Masaharu Fukuyama song) =

Single by Masaharu Fukuyama

from the album f
- B-side: "Sweet Darling"
- Released: March 28, 2001
- Genre: J-pop
- Length: 19:22
- Songwriter: Masaharu Fukuyama

Masaharu Fukuyama singles chronology
"Hey!" (2000)	"Gang" (2001)	"Niji/Himawari/Sore ga Subete sa" (2003)

"Gang" is the seventeenth single by Japanese artist Masaharu Fukuyama. It was released on March 28, 2001.

== Track listing ==
1. "Gang"
2. "Sweet Darling"
3. "Gang" (original karaoke)
4. "Sweet Darling" (original karaoke)

== Oricon sales chart (Japan) ==
Release	Chart	Peak position	First week sales	Sales total
28 March 2001	Oricon Weekly Singles Chart	3	121,430	219,930
28 March 2001	Oricon Yearly Singles Chart	90		
