= Human (Masaharu Fukuyama album) =

Studio album by Masaharu Fukuyama
- Released: April 2, 2014
- Genre: J-pop
- Label: Universal Music Japan

Masaharu Fukuyama chronology
The Best Bang!! (2010)	Human (2014)

Human is the eleventh studio album by Japanese singer-songwriter Masaharu Fukuyama. It was released on April 2, 2014 through Universal Music Japan. The cover jacket of the album is the image of Fukuyama's brain as seen on an MRI scan. The album reached number 1 on the Oricon albums chart and has been certified platinum by the Recording Industry Association of Japan (RIAJ).

The single's artwork was one of the fifty works entered into the shortlist for the 2015 Music Jacket Award committee.

The first track on the album, "Kusunoki" (クスノキ), honours the camphor trees of Sannō Shrine, which, like Fukuyama's own parents, survived the atomic bombing of Nagasaki. Fukuyama used the song to solicit donations which the city of Nagasaki used to establish the Kusunoki Foundation, dedicated to preserving atomic bombed trees and teaching the history associated with them.

== Track listing ==
=== Disc 1 ===
1. Kusunoki (クスノキ, lit. Camphor Tree)
2. Prelude
3. Human
4. Toribi! (とりビー！, lit. For now, beer!)
5. Miscast (ミスキャスト)
6. 246
7. Cherry
8. Akatsuki (暁, lit. Daybreak)
9. Shōwa Yatta ne (昭和やったね, lit. We did it, Showa)

=== Disc 2 ===
1. Kazoku ni Narō yo (家族になろうよ, lit. Let's become a family)
2. Fighting Pose
3. Ikiteru Ikiteku (生きてる生きてく, lit. Go and live life)
4. Around the World
5. Beautiful Life
6. Game
7. Tanjōbi ni wa Masshiro na Yuri o (誕生日には真白な百合を, lit. A pure white lily for your birthday)
8. Get the Groove
9. Koi no Maryoku (恋の魔力, lit. The Magic of Love)

=== DVD (Limited Edition) ===
1. Human
2. Kazoku ni Narō yo (家族になろうよ)
3. Fighting Pose
4. Ikiteru Ikiteku (生きてる生きてく)
5. Beautiful Life
6. Game
7. Tanjōbi ni wa Masshiro na Yuri o (誕生日には真白な百合を)
8. Get the Groove
