= Keshin (song) =

Single by Masaharu Fukuyama

from the album Zankyō
- B-side: Michishirube; Kiss Shite
- Released: 20 May 2009
- Genre: J-pop
- Label: Universal Music Japan
- Songwriter(s): Masaharu Fukuyama

Masaharu Fukuyama singles chronology
"Sō (New Love New World)" (2008)	"Keshin" (2009)	"Hatsukoi" (2009)

"Keshin" (化身, lit. "Reincarnation") is the twenty-fourth single by Japanese artist Masaharu Fukuyama. It was released on 20 May 2009. Keshin was used as the drama Majo Saiban's theme song. "Kiss Shite" (KISSして) is a self-covered version of KOH+ single (collaboration with Kou Shibasaki) and "Tsuioku no Ame no Naka (Live Take)" (追憶の雨の中) is taken from his performance in Daikanshasai 2008. This single was released in three different versions – Limited Towel version, Limited DVD version and Normal version.

== Track listing ==
=== Limited Towel Edition ===
1. Keshin
2. Michishirube (道標)
3. Kiss Shite (KISSして)
4. Tsuioku no Ame no Naka (Live Take) (追憶の雨の中)
5. Keshin (original karaoke)
6. Michishirube (道標) (original karaoke)
7. KISS Shite (KISSして) (original karaoke)

=== Limited/Normal Edition CD ===
1. Keshin
2. Michishirube (道標)
3. Kiss Shite (KISSして)
4. Keshin (original karaoke)
5. Michishirube (道標) (original karaoke)
6. Kiss Shite (KISSして) (original karaoke)

=== Limited Edition ===
1. Keshin (Music Clip)

== Oricon sales chart (Japan) ==
Release	Chart	Peak position	First week sales	Sales total
20 May 2009	Oricon Daily Singles Chart	1		
20 May 2009	Oricon Weekly Singles Chart	1	131,384	207,690
20 May 2009	Oricon Monthly Singles Chart	2		
20 May 2009	Oricon Yearly Singles Chart	24		
