= Hotaru/Shōnen =

Single by Masaharu Fukuyama

from the album The Best Bang!!
- A-side: Hotaru; Shōnen
- B-side: "Revolution / / Evolution"
- Released: 11 August 2010
- Genre: J-pop
- Length: 5:13; 5:05
- Label: Universal Music Japan
- Songwriter: Masaharu Fukuyama
- Producer: Masaharu Fukuyama

Masaharu Fukuyama singles chronology
| "Hatsukoi" (2009) | "Hotaru/Shōnen" (2010) | "Kazoku ni Narō yo/Fighting Pose" (2011) |

"Hotaru/Shōnen" (蛍／少年; "Firefly/Boy") is the twenty-sixth single by Japanese artist Masaharu Fukuyama. It was released on 11 August 2010.

== Track listing ==
All tracks are written by Fukuyama Masaharu.

| No. | Title | Arranger | Length |
|---|---|---|---|
| 1. | "Hotaru" | Akira Inoue | 5:13 |
| 2. | "Shōnen" | Inoue | 5:13 |
| 3. | "Revolution//Evolution" | Inoue | 5:14 |
| 4. | "Hotaru (Original Karaoke)" | Inoue | 5:14 |
| 5. | "Shōnen (Original Karaoke)" | Inoue | 5:03 |
| Total length: | | | 25:49 |

Bonus disc
| No. | Title | Arranger | Length |
|---|---|---|---|
| 1. | "Hotaru (Piano Ver.)" | Fukuyama | 5:32 |
| 2. | "Hotaru (Piano Ver.) (Original Karaoke)" | Fukuyama | 5:11 |
| Total length: | | | 11:02 |

DVD
| No. | Title | Director | Length |
|---|---|---|---|
| 1. | "Hotaru (Music Video)" | Michihiko Yanai |

== Chart rankings ==
All figures are for "Hotaru" or the single as a whole, unless otherwise stated.

Weekly chart performance for "Hotaru"
| Chart (2010) | Peak position |
|---|---|
| Oricon daily singles | 1 |
| Oricon weekly singles | 1 |
| Oricon Yearly singles | 22 |
| Billboard Adult Contemporary Airplay | 2 |
| Billboard Japan Hot 100 | 1 |
| Billboard Japan Hot 100: "Shōnen" | 91 |
| Billboard yearly Japan Hot 100 | 22 |
| RIAJ Digital Track Chart weekly top 100 | 2 |
| RIAJ Digital Track Chart weekly top 100: "Shōnen" | 2 |
| RIAJ Digital Track Chart yearly top 100 | 21 |
| RIAJ Digital Track Chart yearly top 100: "Shōnen" | 93 |

Annual chart rankings for "Hotaru"
| Chart (2010) | Rank |
|---|---|
| Japan Adult Contemporary (Billboard) | 97 |

=== Reported sales and certifications ===
| Chart | Amount |
|---|---|
| Oricon physical sales | 241,000 |
| RIAJ physical shipping certification | Platinum (250,000+) |
| RIAJ full-length cellphone downloads | Platinum (250,000+) |
| RIAJ full-length cellphone downloads: "Shōnen" | Gold (100,000+) |
