= Sō (New Love New World) =

Single by Masaharu Fukuyama

from the album Zankyō
- A-side: "Sō (New Love New World)"
- B-side: Ashita No Show; Higher Stage
- Released: 22 October 2008
- Genre: J-pop
- Length: 28:45; 9:49 (Limited Edition B・Bonus CD)
- Songwriter(s): Masaharu Fukuyama

Masaharu Fukuyama singles chronology
"Tokyo ni mo Attanda/Muteki no Kimi" (2007)	"Sō (New Love New World)" (2008)	"Keshin" (2009)

"Sō (New Love New World)" (想 -new love new world-) is the twenty-third single by the Japanese artist, Masaharu Fukuyama. It was released on 22 October 2008.

== Track listing ==
=== Limited Edition CD ===
1. Sō (New Love New World)
2. Ashita No Show (明日の☆SHOW)
3. Higher Stage
4. Sō (New Love New World) (original karaoke)
5. Ashita No Show (明日の☆SHOW) (original karaoke)
6. Higher Stage (original karaoke)

=== Normal Edition CD ===
1. Sō (New Love New World)
2. Ashita No Show (明日の☆SHOW)
3. Higher Stage
4. Sō (New Love New World) (original karaoke)
5. Ashita No Show (明日の☆SHOW) (original karaoke)
6. Higher Stage (original karaoke)

=== Limited Edition DVD A ===
1. Sō (New Love New World) (music clip)

=== Limited Edition Bonus CD B ===
1. Kakusei Mo Mento
2. vs. Chikaku To Kairaku No Rasen

== Oricon sales chart (Japan) ==
Release	Chart	Peak position	First week sales	Sales total
22 October 2008	Oricon Daily Singles Chart	2		
22 October 2008	Oricon Weekly Singles Chart	2	110,598	162,000
22 October 2008	Oricon Yearly Singles Chart	36		
