= Naitari Shinaide/Red x Blue =

Single by Masaharu Fukuyama

from the album 5 Nen Mono
- Released: December 1, 2004
- Genre: J-pop
- Length: 18:04
- Songwriter: Masaharu Fukuyama

Masaharu Fukuyama singles chronology
""Niji/Himawari/Sore ga Subete sa" (2003)	"Naitari Shinaide/Red x Blue" (2004)	"Tokyo" (2005)

"Naitari Shinaide/Red x Blue" (泣いたりしないで/RED×BLUE) is the nineteenth single by Japanese artist Masaharu Fukuyama. It was released on December 1, 2004.

== Track listing ==
1. "Naitari Shinaide"
2. "Red x Blue"
3. "Naitari Shinaide" (original karaoke)
4. "Red x Blue" (original karaoke)

== Oricon sales chart (Japan) ==
Release	Chart	Peak position	First week sales	Sales total
28 March 2001	Oricon Weekly Singles Chart	1	101,136	196,667
28 March 2001	Oricon Yearly Singles Chart	46		
