= Tokyo ni mo Attanda/Muteki no Kimi =

Single by Masaharu Fukuyama
- A-side: "Tokyo ni mo Attanda; Muteki no Kimi"
- Released: 11 April 2007
- Genre: J-pop
- Length: 21:38
- Songwriter(s): Masaharu Fukuyama

Masaharu Fukuyama singles chronology
"Milk Tea/Utsukushiki Hana" (2006)	"Tokyo ni mo Attanda/Muteki no Kimi" (2007)	"Sō (New Love New World)" (2008)

"Tokyo ni mo Attanda/Muteki no Kimi" (東京にもあったんだ/無敵のキミ) is the twenty-second single by Japanese artist Masaharu Fukuyama. It was released on 11 April 2007.

== Track listing ==
=== Limited Edition CD ===
1. Tokyo ni mo Attanda
2. Muteki no Kimi
3. Tokyo ni mo Attanda (Original Karaoke)
4. Muteki no Kimi (Original Karaoke)

=== Limited Edition DVD ===
1. Tokyo ni mo Attanda (Music Clip)

=== Normal Edition CD ===
1. Tokyo ni mo Attanda
2. Muteki no Kimi
3. Tokyo ni mo Attanda (Original Karaoke)
4. Muteki no Kimi (Original Karaoke)

== Oricon sales chart (Japan) ==
Release	Chart	Peak position	First week sales	Sales total
11 April 2007	Oricon Daily Singles Chart	2		
11 April 2007	Oricon Weekly Singles Chart	2	87,000	139,000
11 April 2007	Oricon Yearly Singles Chart	54		
