= Milk Tea/Utsukushiki Hana =

Single by Masaharu Fukuyama
- A-side: Milk Tea; Utsukushiki Hana
- B-side: Love Train; Ano Natsu Mo Umi Mo Sora Mo
- Released: 24 May 2006
- Genre: J-pop
- Length: 39:47
- Songwriter(s): Masaharu Fukuyama

Masaharu Fukuyama singles chronology
"Tokyo" (2005)	"Milk Tea" / "Utsukushiki Hana" (2006)	"Tokyo ni mo Attanda/Muteki no Kimi" (2007)

"Milk Tea/Utsukushiki Hana" (milk tea/美しき花, lit. "Milk Tea/Beautiful Flower") is the twenty-first single by Japanese artist Masaharu Fukuyama. It was released on 24 May 2006.

== Track listing ==
=== Limited Edition CD ===
1. Milk Tea
2. Utsukushiki Hana
3. Love Train
4. Ano Natsu Mo Umi Mo Sora Mo
5. Milk Tea (Original Karaoke)
6. Utsukushiki Hana (Original Karaoke)
7. Love Train (Original Karaoke)
8. Ano Natsu Mo Umi Mo Sora Mo (Original Karaoke)

=== Limited Edition DVD ===
1. Milk Tea (Special Clip)
2. Utsukushiki Hana (Special Clip)

=== Normal Edition CD ===
1. Milk Tea
2. Utsukushiki Hana
3. Love Train
4. Ano Natsu Mo Umi Mo Sora Mo
5. Milk Tea (Original Karaoke)
6. Utsukushiki Hana (Original Karaoke)
7. Love Train (Original Karaoke)
8. Ano Natsu Mo Umi Mo Sora Mo (Original Karaoke)

== Oricon sales chart (Japan) ==
Release	Chart	Peak position	First week sales	Sales total
24 May 2006	Oricon Daily Singles Chart	1		
24 May 2006	Oricon Weekly Singles Chart	1	185,551	359,000
24 May 2006	Oricon Yearly Singles Chart	16		
