= Sakura Zaka =

2000 single by Masaharu Fukuyama

Single by Masaharu Fukuyama

from the album f
- B-side: "Drive-In Theater de Kuchizuke o"; "Shunkashūtō"
- Released: April 26, 2000
- Genre: J-pop
- Length: 4:57
- Label: Universal J
- Songwriter(s): Masaharu Fukuyama
- Producer(s): Masaharu Fukuyama

Masaharu Fukuyama singles chronology
"Heaven/Squall" (1999)	"Sakura Zaka" (2000)	"Hey!" (2000)

"Sakura Zaka" (桜坂, "Cherry blossom slope") is a song by Japanese entertainer Masaharu Fukuyama from his eighth studio album, f (2001). It was released on April 26, 2000 through Universal J as the second single from the album. The song was written and produced by Fukuyama, while Motohiro Tomita handled the arrangement. The single topped the Oricon Singles Chart for three consecutive weeks and has sold over two million copies. It was certified two-times million by the Recording Industry Association of Japan (RIAJ).

== Cover versions ==
Debbie Gibson recorded an English-language cover of the song in her 2010 Japan-only release Ms. Vocalist.

== Track listing ==
Original release
No.	Title	Lyrics	Music	Arranger	Length
1.	"Sakura Zaka"	Masaharu Fukuyama	M. Fukuyama	Motohiro Tomita	4:57
2.	"Drive-In Theater de Kuchizuke o" (DRIVE-IN THEATERでくちづけを "A Kiss at the Drive-In Theater")	M. Fukuyama	M. Fukuyama	M. Tomita	4:16
3.	"Sakura Zaka (Nayuta Version/Instrumental)"	M. Fukuyama	M. Fukuyama	Hiroshi Shinkawa	4:47
4.	"Drive-In Theater de Kuchizuke o (Nomozaki Version/Instrumental)"	M. Fukuyama	M. Fukuyama	H. Shinkawa	1:56
5.	"Sakura Zaka (Original Karaoke)"	M. Fukuyama	M. Fukuyama	M. Tomita	4:57
6.	"Drive-In Theater de Kuchizuke o (Original Karaoke)"	M. Fukuyama	M. Fukuyama	M. Tomita	4:17
Total length:					23:50

Limited edition
No.	Title	Lyrics	Music	Arranger	Length
1.	"Sakura Zaka"	Masaharu Fukuyama	M. Fukuyama	Motohiro Tomita	4:57
2.	"Drive-In Theater de Kuchizuke o"	M. Fukuyama	M. Fukuyama	M. Tomita	4:16
3.	"Shunkashūto" (春夏秋冬 "Four Seasons")	Shigeru Izumiya	S. Izumiya	Chūei Yoshikawa	7:05
4.	"Sakura Zaka (Nayuta Version/Instrumental)"	M. Fukuyama	M. Fukuyama	Hiroshi Shinkawa	4:47
5.	"Drive-In Theater de Kuchizuke o (Nomozaki Version/Instrumental)"	M. Fukuyama	M. Fukuyama	H. Shinkawa	1:56
6.	"Sakura Zaka (Original Karaoke)"	M. Fukuyama	M. Fukuyama	M. Tomita	4:57
7.	"Drive-In Theater de Kuchizuke o (Original Karaoke)"	M. Fukuyama	M. Fukuyama	M. Tomita	4:17
8.	"Shunkashūto (Original Karaoke)"	S. Izumiya	S. Izumiya	C. Yoshikawa	7:05
Total length:					38:01

== Credits and personnel ==
"Sakura Zaka"

- Keyboards: Motohiro Tomita
- Programming: Nobuo Moriyasu
- Guitars: Hirokazu Ogura
- Backing vocals: May Yamane, Yuiko Tsubokura, Misa Nakayama

"Drive-In Theater de Kuchizuke o"

- Keyboards: Motohiro Tomita
- Programming: Nobuo Moriyasu
- Drums: Toshiya Matsunaga
- Bass: Chiharu Mikuzuki
- Guitars: Motohiro Tomita, Hirokazu Ogura, George Kamata, Masaharu Fukuyama
- Backing vocals: Mai Yamane, Naoki Takao, Masaharu Fukuyama

"Shunkashūto"

- Keyboards and programming: Akira Inoue
- Guitars: Chūei Yoshikawa, Masaharu Fukuyama
- Strings: Kinbara Strings

"Sakura Zaka" (Nayuta Version/Instrumental)

- Keyboards and programming: Hiroshi Shinkawa
- Acoustic guitar: Chūei Yoshikawa
- Bass: Hideki Matsubara
- Harmonica: Nobuo Yagi

"Drive-In Theater de Kuchizuke o" (Nomozaki Version/Instrumental)

- Keyboards and programming: Hiroshi Shinkawa
- Acoustic guitar: Chūei Yoshikawa
- Marimba: Motoya Hamaguchi

== Charts and certifications ==
=== Charts ===
Chart (2000)	Peak position
Oricon Weekly Singles Chart	1
Oricon Yearly Singles Chart	2
Chart (2011)	Peak position
Billboard Japan Hot 100	21

=== Certifications ===
Country	Provider	Certifications
Japan	RIAJ	2× Million
