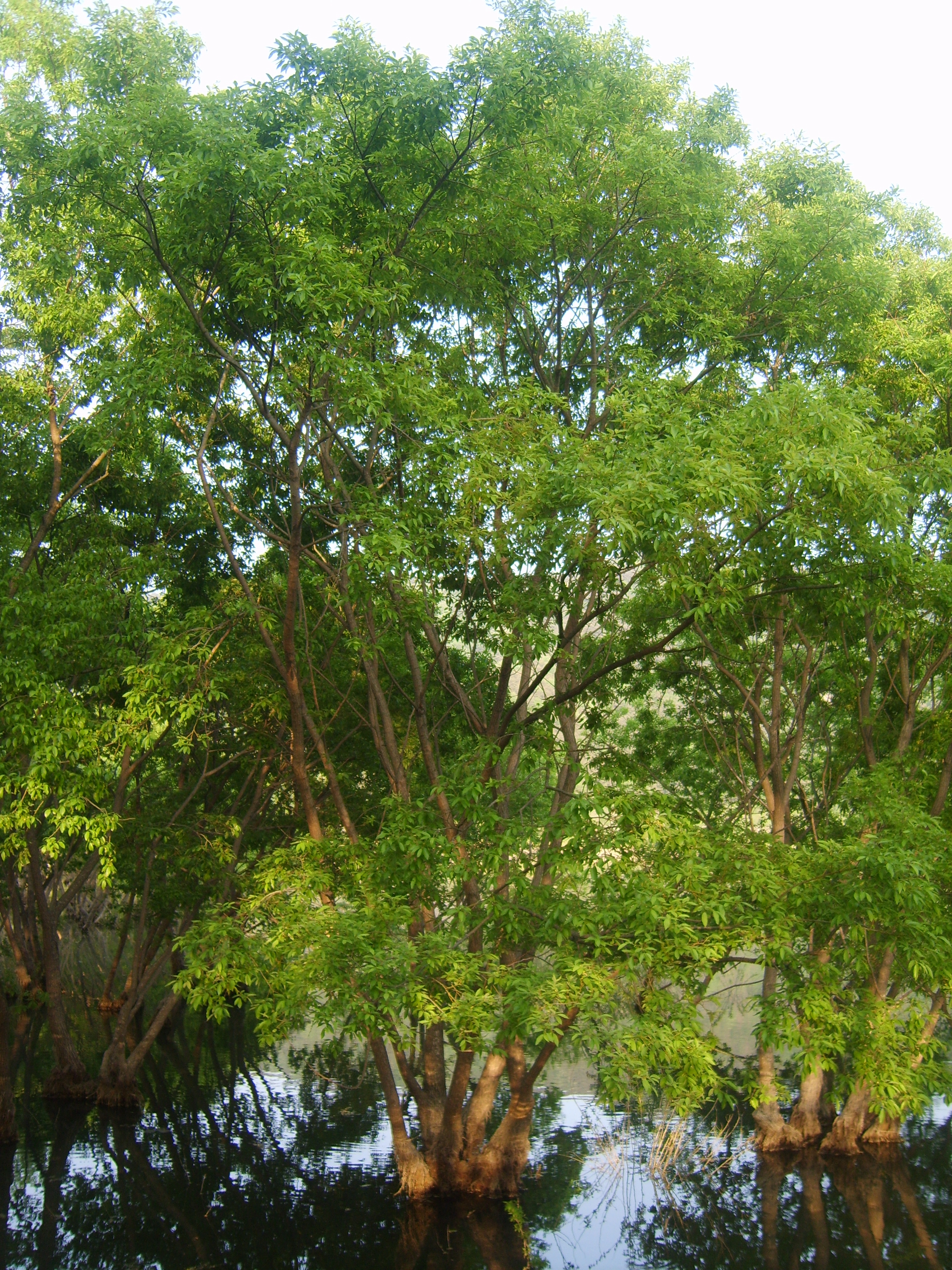
- S. chaenomeloides in Hampyung, Korea

Conservation status
- Least Concern (IUCN 3.1)

Scientific classification
- Kingdom: Plantae
- Clade: Tracheophytes
- Clade: Angiosperms
- Clade: Eudicots
- Clade: Rosids
- Order: Malpighiales
- Family: Salicaceae
- Genus: Salix
- Species: S. chaenomeloides

Binomial name
- Salix chaenomeloides Kimura

= Salix chaenomeloides =

Species of willow

Salix chaenomeloides is a species of willow native to Japan, Korea, and China. The species was first described in 1938 by Arika Kimura.

They are deciduous trees, reaching heights of 10–20 m. Trees are either male or female, and prefer moist or wet soils, generally growing in or near water.

The Seongju Gyeongsan-ri Seongbaek Forest (성주 경산리 성밖숲) is a Korean Natural Monument which protects a stand of these trees, in Seongju.

== Gallery ==
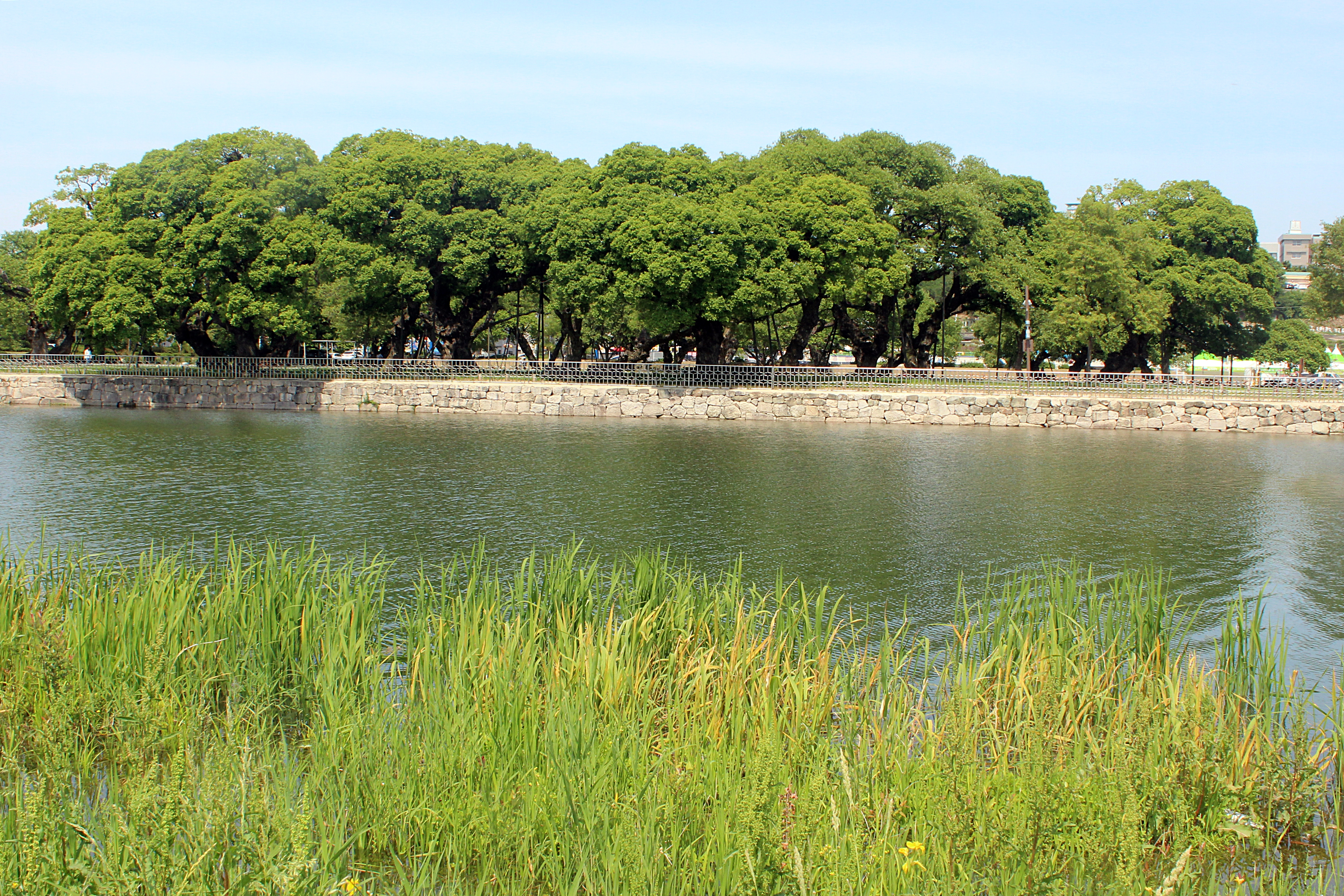
Seongju Seongbaek forest (natural monument 403)

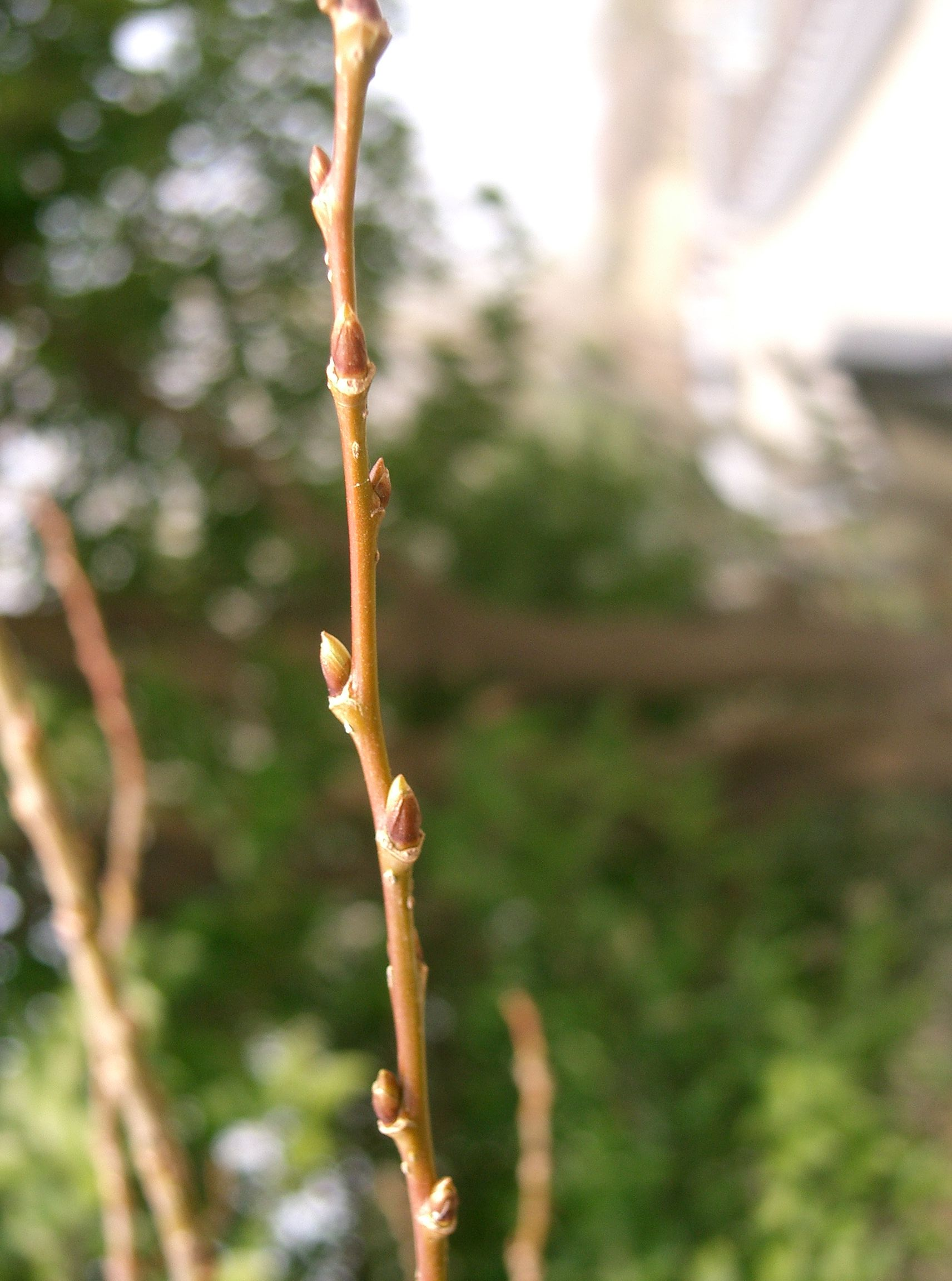

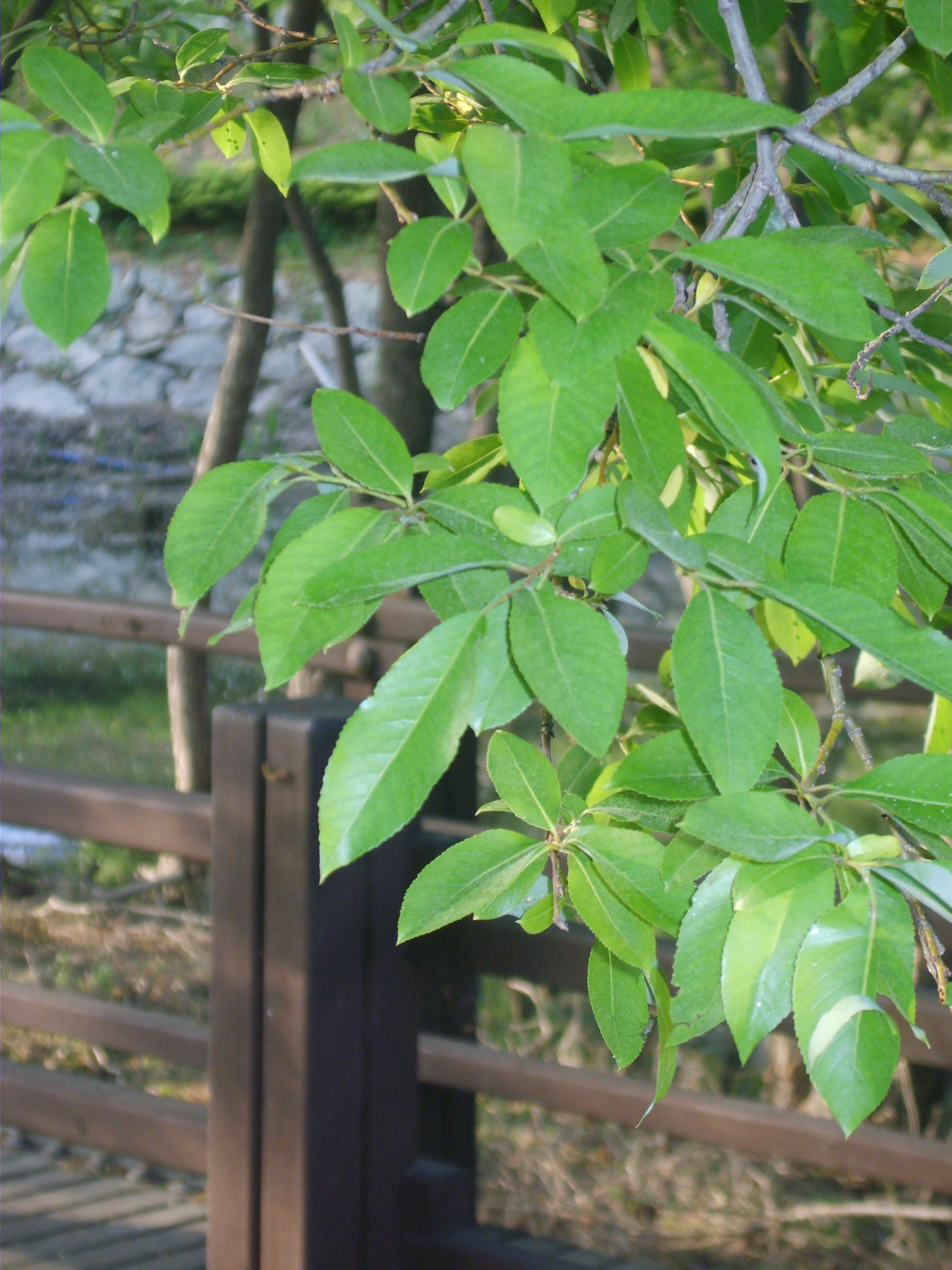
leaves

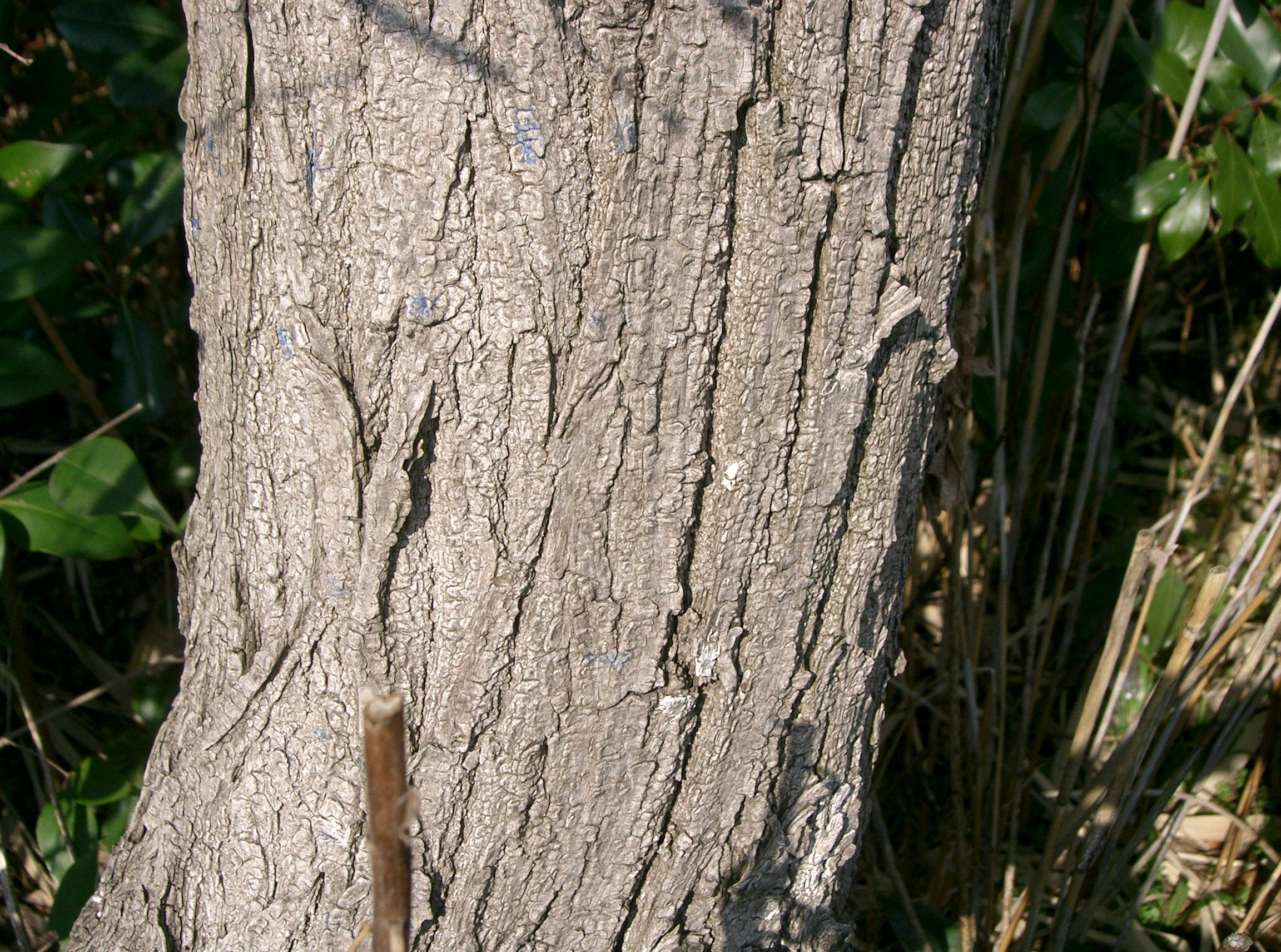
trunk
