= Niji/Himawari/Sore ga Subete sa =

Single by Masaharu Fukuyama

from the album 5 Nen Mono
- Released: 27 August 2003
- Genre: J-pop
- Length: 44:17
- Songwriter(s): Masaharu Fukuyama

Masaharu Fukuyama singles chronology
"Gang" (2001)	"Niji/Himawari/Sore ga Subete sa" (2003)	"Naitari Shinaide/Red x Blue" (2004)

"Niji/Himawari/Sore ga Subete sa" (虹/ひまわり/それがすべてさ) is the eighteenth single by Japanese artist Masaharu Fukuyama. It was released on 27 August 2003. This single sold around 356,600 copies in its first week. It remained at the number 1 position on the Oricon chart for 5 consecutive weeks, breaking the artist record of four consecutive week from his 1994 single "It's Only Love". Niji was used as the theme song for Fuji Television drama Water Boys and Water Boys 2. "Himawari", written by himself, was originally released as a single sung by Kiyoshi Maekawa in 2002.

== Track listing ==
1. Niji
2. Himawari
3. Sore ga Subete sa
4. Himawari: Fields of Toscana
5. Niji: Synchronised Mix
6. Niji (original karaoke)
7. Himawari (original karaoke)
8. Sore ga Subete sa (original karaoke)

== Oricon sales chart (Japan) ==
Release	Chart	Peak position	First week sales	Sales total
27 August 2003	Oricon Daily Singles Chart	1		
27 August 2003	Oricon Weekly Singles Chart	1	356,629	893,000
27 August 2003	Oricon Monthly Singles Chart	1		
27 August 2003	Oricon Yearly Singles Chart	2		
