= Hatsukoi (Masaharu Fukuyama song) =

Single by Masaharu Fukuyama

from the album The Best Bang!!
- B-side: "On and On 09"; "Ammonite no Yume"
- Released: 16 December 2009
- Genre: J-pop
- Label: Universal Music Japan
- Songwriter: Masaharu Fukuyama
- Producer: Masaharu Fukuyama

Masaharu Fukuyama singles chronology
"Keshin" (2009)	"Hatsukoi" (2009)	"Hotaru/Shōnen" (2010)

"Hatsukoi" (はつ恋, lit. "First Love") is the twenty-fifth single by Japanese artist Masaharu Fukuyama. It was released on 16 December 2009. "Hatsukoi" (はつ恋) has a tied in with Toshiba Regza Fall/Winter CM. "On and On 09'" is the re-worked version of "On and On," which was performed in Mischishirube 20th Anniversary Tour. "Anmonite No Yume" (アンモナイトの夢) is an instrumental piece used in Dunlop CM. This single was released in three versions- Limited Edition T-shirt, (designed by Lily Franky), Limited Edition DVD (which includes the PV for Hatsukoi) and Normal Edition. Fukuyama decided to release "Hatsukoi" as a single due to the public demands. He also performed the song in NHK's Kōhaku Uta Gassen, live via satellite from Glover Garden in Nagasaki.

== Track listing ==
=== CD ===
1. Hatsukoi (はつ恋) (First Love)
2. On and On 09
3. Anmonite No Yume (アンモナイトの夢) (Dreams of Ammonite)
4. Hatsukoi (はつ恋) (original karaoke)
5. On and On 09 (original karaoke)

=== Limited Edition DVD ===
1. Hatsukoi (はつ恋) (Music Clip)

== Charts ==
Weekly chart performance for "Hatsukoi"
Release	Chart	Peak position	First week sales	Sales total
16 December 2009	Oricon Daily Singles Chart	1		
16 December 2009	Oricon Weekly Singles Chart	1	151,030	263,225
16 December 2009	Oricon Monthly Singles Chart	1		
16 December 2009	Oricon Yearly Singles Chart	19		269,765

Annual chart rankings for "Hatsukoi"
Chart (2010)	Rank
Japan Adult Contemporary (Billboard)	49
