= Heaven/Squall =

Single by Masaharu Fukuyama
- Released: November 17, 1999
- Genre: J-pop
- Length: 18:14
- Label: BMG Japan
- Songwriter(s): Masaharu Fukuyama

Masaharu Fukuyama singles chronology
"Peach!!/Heart of Xmas" (1999)	"Heaven/Squall" (1999)	"Sakura Zaka" (2000)

"Heaven/Squall" is the fourteenth single by Japanese artist Masaharu Fukuyama. It was released on November 17, 1999. It debuted at the number two position on the Oricon Chart in its first week with sales of 123,480 copies. It reached the number-one spot on the chart in its fifth week.

Heaven was used as the drama Out! Tsumatachi no Hanzai's theme song.

== Track listing ==
1. Heaven
2. Squall
3. Heaven(original karaoke)
4. Squall (original karaoke)

== Oricon sales chart (Japan) ==
Release	Chart	Peak position	First week sales	Sales total
17 November 1999	Oricon Daily Singles Chart	2		
17 November 1999	Oricon Weekly Singles Chart	2	123,480	808,090
17 November 1999	Oricon Yearly Singles Chart	21		
