= Message (Masaharu Fukuyama song) =

Single by Masaharu Fukuyama
- B-side: "Ima Konohi Totokiga Tōi Yume Noyōni"
- Released: October 2, 1995
- Genre: J-pop
- Songwriter(s): Masaharu Fukuyama

Masaharu Fukuyama singles chronology
| "Hello" (1995) | "Message" (1995) | "Heart/You" (1995) |

"Message" is the eleventh single by Japanese artist Masaharu Fukuyama. It was released on October 2, 1995.

== Track listing ==
1. Message
2. Ima Konohi Totokiga Tōi Yume Noyōni (今 このひとときが 遠い夢のように)
3. Message (Original karaoke)
4. Ima Konohi Totokiga Tōi Yume Noyōni (今 このひとときが 遠い夢のように) (Original karaoke)

== Oricon sales chart (Japan) ==
| Release | Chart | Peak position | First week sales | Sales total |
|---|---|---|---|---|
| 2 October 1995 | Oricon Daily Singles Chart | 1 | | |
| 2 October 1995 | Oricon Weekly Singles Chart | 1 | 398,000 | 879,000 |
| 2 October 1995 | Oricon Monthly Singles Chart | 2 | | |
| 2 October 1995 | Oricon Yearly Singles Chart | 37 | | |
