= Peach!!/Heart of Xmas =

Single by Masaharu Fukuyama

from the album MAGNUM COLLECTION 1999 "Dear"
- Released: November 5, 1998
- Genre: J-POP
- Songwriter(s): Masaharu Fukuyama

Masaharu Fukuyama singles chronology
"Heart/You" (1998)	"Peach!!/Heart of Xmas" (1998)	"Heaven/Squall" (1999)

"Peach!!/Heart of Xmas" is the thirteenth single by Japanese artist Masaharu Fukuyama. It was released on November 5, 1998. It reached #4 on the Oricon chart.

== Track listing ==
All tracks are written by Fukuyama Masaharu

No.	Title	Length
1.	"Peach!!"
2.	"Heart of Xmas"
3.	"Peach!! (original karoke)"
4.	"Heart of Xmas (original karaoke)"
Total length:		21:45

== Charts ==
Chart (1998)	Peak position
Oricon daily singles	4
Oricon weekly singles	4
