= Melody (Masaharu Fukuyama song) =

Single by Masaharu Fukuyama
- B-side: "Baby Baby"
- Released: June 2, 1993
- Genre: J-pop
- Songwriter(s): Fukuyama Masaharu

Masaharu Fukuyama singles chronology
"Yakusoku no Oka" (1992)	"Melody" (1993)	"All My Loving/Koibito" (1993)

"Melody" is the seventh single by Japanese artist Masaharu Fukuyama. It was released on June 2, 1993.

== Track listing ==
1. Melody
2. Baby Baby
3. Melody (Original karaoke)

== Oricon sales chart (Japan) ==
Release	Chart	Peak position	First week sales	Sales total
2 June 1993	Oricon Daily Singles Chart	5		
2 June 1993	Oricon Weekly Singles Chart	5	86,000	593,000
2 June 1993	Oricon Yearly Singles Chart	49		
