= All My Loving/Koibito =

"All My Loving"

Single by Masaharu Fukuyama
- A-side: "All My Loving"; "Koibito"
- Released: September 29, 1993
- Genre: J-pop
- Songwriter(s): Masaharu Fukuyama

Masaharu Fukuyama singles chronology
"Melody" (1993)	"All My Loving" (1993)	"It's Only Love/Sorry Baby" (1994)

"All My Loving" is the eighth single by Japanese artist Masaharu Fukuyama. It was released on September 29, 1993.

== Track listing ==
1. All My Loving
2. Koibito (恋人)
3. All My Loving (original karaoke)
4. Koibito (恋人) (original karaoke)

== Oricon sales chart (Japan) ==
Release	Chart	Peak position	First week sales	Sales total
29 September 1993	Oricon Daily Singles Chart	2		
29 September 1993	Oricon Weekly Singles Chart	2	120,000	479,000
29 September 1993	Oricon Monthly Singles Chart	6		
29 September 1993	Oricon Yearly Singles Chart	58		
