= Heart/You =

Single by Masaharu Fukuyama
- B-side: "Like a Hurricane"
- Released: April 30, 1998
- Genre: J-pop
- Songwriter(s): Masaharu Fukuyama

Masaharu Fukuyama singles chronology
"Message" (1995)	"Heart/You" (1998)	"Peach!!/Heart of Xmas" (1998)

"Heart/You" is the twelfth single by Japanese artist Masaharu Fukuyama. It was released on April 30, 1998. It was used as the drama Meguriai's theme song.

== Track listing ==
No.	Title	Length
1.	"Heart"	4:51
2.	"You"	4:43
3.	"Like A Hurricane"	4:46
4.	"Heart (Original Karaoke)"	4:51
5.	"You (Original Karaoke)"	4:44
6.	"Like A Hurricane (Original Karaoke)"	4:43

== Oricon sales chart (Japan) ==
Release	Chart	Peak position	First week sales	Sales total
30 April 1998	Oricon Daily Singles Chart	3		
30 April 1998	Oricon Weekly Singles Chart	3	214,000	569,000
30 April 1998	Oricon Monthly Singles Chart	3		
30 April 1998	Oricon Yearly Singles Chart	40		
