= It's Only Love/Sorry Baby =

"It's Only Love"

Single by Masaharu Fukuyama
- A-side: "It's Only Love"
- B-side: "Sorry Baby"
- Released: 24 March 1994
- Genre: J-pop
- Length: 19:09

Masaharu Fukuyama singles chronology
"All My Loving/Koibito" (1993)	"It's Only Love" (1994)	"Hello" (1995)

"It's Only Love" is the ninth single by Japanese artist Masaharu Fukuyama. It was released on 24 March 1994. It topped the Japanese Oricon chart for four consecutive weeks.

== Track listing ==
1. It's Only Love
2. Sorry Baby
3. It's Only Love (Original karaoke)
4. Sorry Baby (Original karaoke)

== Oricon sales chart (Japan) ==
Release	Chart	Peak position	First week sales	Sales total
24 March 1994	Oricon Daily Singles Chart	1		
24 March 1994	Oricon Weekly Singles Chart	1	201,000	1,175,000
24 March 1994	Oricon Monthly Singles Chart	1		
24 March 1994	Oricon Yearly Singles Chart	12		
