= Zankyō =

Studio album by Masaharu Fukuyama
- Released: 30 June 2009
- Genre: J-pop
- Length: 72:07
- Label: Universal Music(Japan)
- Producer: Masaharu Fukuyama

Masaharu Fukuyama chronology
5 Nen Mono (2006)	Zankyō (2009)	The Best Bang!! (2010)

Zankyō (残響, "Echo") is the tenth studio album by Japanese artist Masaharu Fukuyama. It was released on 30 June 2009. It reached the number 1 spot on the Oricon chart with sales of 260,917.

== Track listing ==
All lyrics and music by Masaharu Fukuyama. Arranged by Masaharu Fukuyama and Akira Inoue, except "Tokyo ni mo Attanda" by Masaharu Fukuyama and Takayuki Hattori.

1. Gunjō (Ultramarine) (群青 ～ultramarine～)
2. Keshin (化身)
3. Ashiita no Show (明日の☆SHOW)
4. Nagareboshi (ながれ星)
5. Kōfuku-ron (幸福論)
6. 18 (Eighteen)
7. Saiai (最愛)
8. Sō (New Love New World) (想 -new love new world-)
9. Phantom
10. Survivor
11. Kon'ya, Kimi o Daite (今夜、君を抱いて)
12. Tabibito (旅人)
13. Tokyo ni mo Attanda (東京にもあったんだ)
14. Michishirube (道標)
15. 99

== Charts and sales ==
=== Oricon sales charts (Japan) ===
Release	Chart	Peak position	First week sales	Sales total
30 June 2009	Oricon Daily Chart	1		
30 June 2009	Oricon Weekly Chart	1	260,917	470,398
30 June 2009	Oricon Monthly Chart	1		
30 June 2009	Oricon Yearly Chart	11		
