= Hello (Masaharu Fukuyama song) =

1995 single by Masaharu Fukuyama

Single by Masaharu Fukuyama

from the album M Collection: Kaze o Sagashiteru
- B-side: "Sono Mama de..."; "Pa Pa Pa"
- Released: February 6, 1995
- Genre: J-pop
- Songwriter: Masaharu Fukuyama

Masaharu Fukuyama singles chronology
"It's Only Love/Sorry Baby" (1994)	"Hello" (1995)	"Message" (1995)

"Hello" is the tenth single by Japanese artist Masaharu Fukuyama. It was released on February 6, 1995. It was used as the theme song to the drama Saikō no Kataomoi: White Love Story. In professional wrestling, it is best known as the entrance song of Kuroshio Tokyo Japan.

== Track listing ==
1. Hello
2. Sono Mama de... (そのままで…)
3. Pa Pa Pa
4. Hello (Original karaoke)
5. Sono Mama de... (そのままで…) (Original karaoke)
6. Pa Pa Pa (Original karaoke)

== Oricon sales chart (Japan) ==
Release	Chart	Peak position	First week sales	Sales total
6 February 1995	Oricon Daily Singles Chart	1		
6 February 1995	Oricon Weekly Singles Chart	1	701,000	1,870,000
6 February 1995	Oricon Monthly Singles Chart	1		
6 February 1995	Oricon Yearly Singles Chart	3		
