= 5 Nen Mono =

Studio album by Masaharu Fukuyama
- Released: 6 December 2006
- Genre: J-pop
- Length: Limited Edition 73:59; Normal Edition 69:23
- Label: Universal Music (Japan)

Masaharu Fukuyama chronology
f (2001)	5 Nen Mono (2006)	Zankyō (2009)

5 Nen Mono (5年モノ, Go-nen Mono) is the ninth studio album by Japanese artist Masaharu Fukuyama. It was released on 6 December 2006. This album was released five years after his previous album, f, making it the longest interval between releases for the artist.

== Track listing ==
=== CD ===
1. Freedom
2. The Edge of Chaos: Ai no Ichigeki (THE EDGE OF CHAOS 〜愛の一撃〜)
3. Niji (虹) (new mix)
4. Himawari (ひまわり) (new mix)
5. Sore ga Subete sa (それがすべてさ) (new mix)
6. Naitari Shinaide (泣いたりしないで) (new mix)
7. Red x Blue (new mix)
8. Tokyo (東京)
9. Milk Tea
10. Utsukushiki Hana (美しき花) (new mix)
11. Love Train
12. Ano Natsu mo Umi mo Sora mo (あの夏も 海も 空も) (new mix)
13. Beautiful Day
14. Watashi wa Kaze ni Naru (live version) (わたしは風になる （LIVE VERSION）)

=== Bonus CD (Limited Edition) ===
1. Sandy

== Charts and sales ==
=== Oricon sales charts (Japan) ===
Release	Chart	Peak position	First week sales	Sales total
6 December 2006	Oricon Daily Chart	1		
6 December 2006	Oricon Weekly Chart	1	225,388	450,000+
6 December 2006	Oricon Monthly Chart	2		
6 December 2006	Oricon Yearly Chart (2006)	56		
