= F (album) =

f

Studio album by Masaharu Fukuyama
- Released: 25 April 2001
- Genre: J-pop
- Length: 59:52
- Label: Universal Music (Japan)

Masaharu Fukuyama chronology
Sing a Song (1998)	f (2001)	5 Nen Mono (2006)

f is the eighth studio album by Japanese artist Masaharu Fukuyama. It was released on 25 April 2001.

== Track listing ==
1. Tomo yo (友よ, lit. Friend!)
2. Heaven
3. Venus
4. Mikan-iro no Natsuyasumi (蜜柑色の夏休み)
5. Sakura Zaka (桜坂, lit. Sakura Hill)
6. Escape
7. Hey! (New Century Mix)
8. Gang
9. Dogi-magi
10. Blues
11. Carnival
12. Ieji (家路, lit. Road Home)
13. Shunkashūtō (春夏秋冬)

== Charts and sales ==
=== Oricon sales charts (Japan) ===
Release	Chart	Peak position	First week sales	Sales total
25 April 2001	Oricon Daily Chart	2		
25 April 2001	Oricon Weekly Chart	2	504,270	873,000
25 April 2001	Oricon Monthly Chart	2		
25 April 2001	Oricon Yearly Chart (2001)	25		
