= Masaharu Fukuyama =

Japanese singer-songwriter and actor (born 1969)

- 福山 雅治
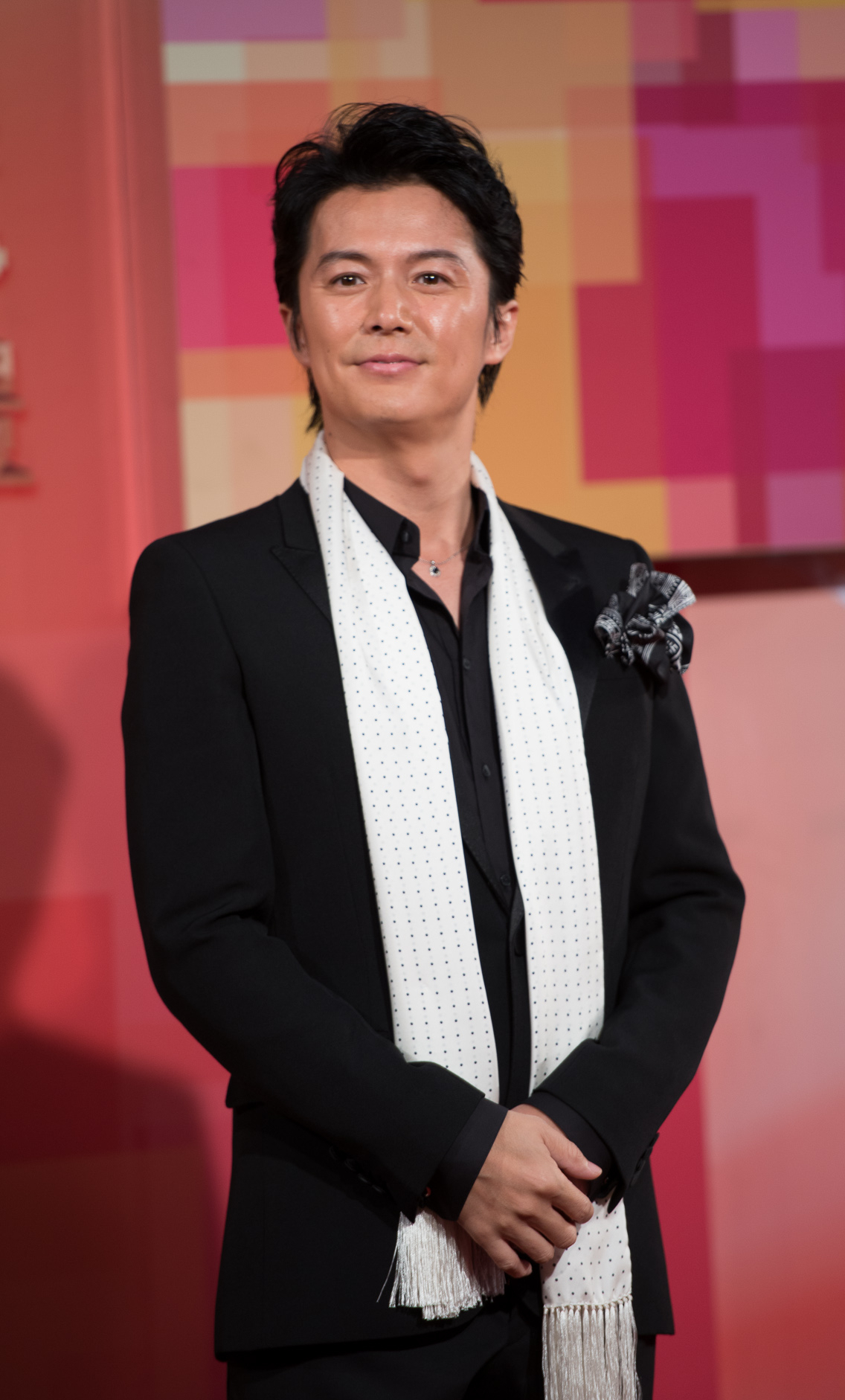
- Fukuyama at Golden Melody Awards in 2013
- Born: February 6, 1969 (age 57); Nagasaki, Japan
- Education: Nagasaki Prefectural Nagasaki Technical High School
- Occupations: Musician; singer-songwriter; record producer; actor; radio personality; photographer
- Years active: 1988–present
- Agent: Amuse, Inc.
- Partner: Kazue Fukiishi (m. 2015)
- Children: 1
- Musical career
- Genres: Pop; rock
- Instruments: Vocals; guitar; bass; keyboards; drums; harmonica
- Labels: BMG Japan; (1990–99); Universal Music; (2000–present)
- Website: www.fukuyamamasaharu.com

Masaharu Fukuyama (福山 雅治, Fukuyama Masaharu; born February 6, 1969) is a Japanese singer-songwriter and actor from Nagasaki. He debuted in 1990 with the single "Tsuioku no Ame no Naka".

Fukuyama is represented by the agency Amuse, Inc.

== Career ==
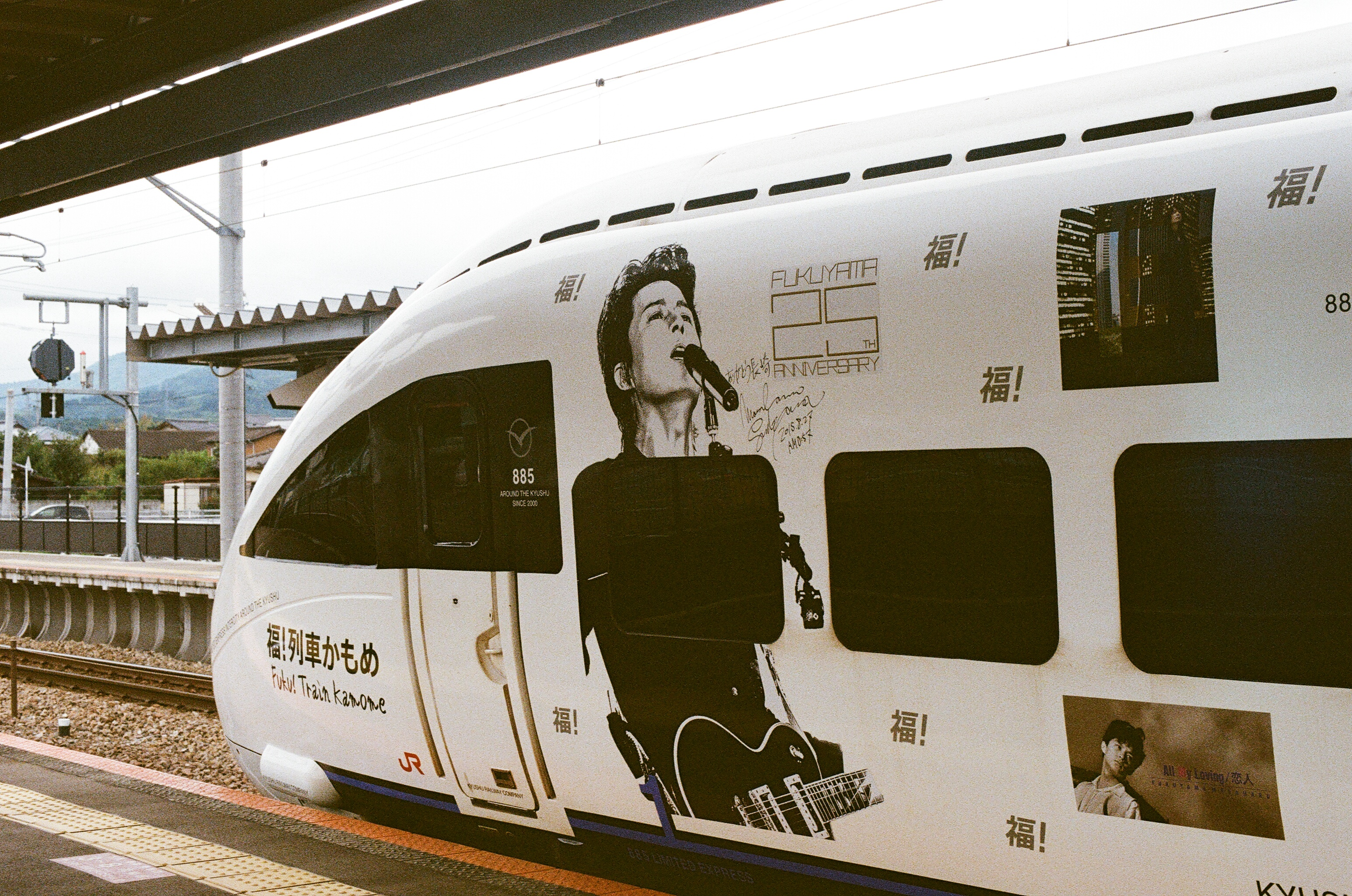
An 885 series Kamome train displaying Fukuyama's picture at Shin-Tosu Station, 2015.The station is on the Nagasaki Line serving Fukuyama's hometown.

While Fukuyama can also be seen in Japanese television dramas and films, he is best known for his singing career. His 1992 breakout single "Good night" gained a wide audience because of its tie-in with the TV drama Ai wo Douda. In 1993, he made his first appearance in Kōhaku Uta Gassen, on which only successful J-pop and enka artists are invited to perform. Propelled by the success of his performance in the TV drama Under the Same Roof, in which he played Chinichan, the second older brother in the Kashiwagi family, he had his first million-selling single, "It's Only Love/Sorry Baby", in 1994. His 1995 single "Hello" became the second highest selling single that year.

Fukuyama took a hiatus in 1996, stopping all his entertainment activities except his radio shows. He returned to the entertainment scene in 1998, and his first single after two years hiatus, "Heart/You", landed at number 3 on Oricon chart and sold 569,000 copies. Encouraged by this success, he began his Daikanshasai (Thanksgiving) series of concerts to show his appreciation for his fans.

"Sakura Zaka" and "Niji" are among Masaharu's popular songs. His 2000 single "Sakura Zaka" sold more than 751,000 copies in its first week and remained at the top of the Japanese Oricon chart for 3 consecutive weeks; it sold about 2,299,000 copies on the Oricon charts overall. "Niji" was a theme song for the Japanese drama Water Boys. His triple A-side single "Niji/Himawari/Sore ga Subete sa", released on August 26, 2003, debuted at No. 1 on the Oricon single charts and topped them for five consecutive weeks. His has cemented his status as the best-selling male solo artist in Japan, having sold 21.27 million copies so far.

In 2007, after a four-years absence from drama, Fukuyama returned to television, starring as the brilliant but eccentric physics associate professor, Manabu Yukawa, in the television drama Galileo.

In 2008, NHK selected Fukuyama to portray Sakamoto Ryōma, the title character, in the 2010 year-long prime-time television Taiga drama Ryōmaden.

In 2009, he held his 20th anniversary national arena tour which covered 36 performances in 12 cities over four consecutive months (June to September) with a total audience count of 500,000. Two weeks before the tour started, he held four shows at the Nippon Budokan (May 28, 29 and June 4, 5) his first ever solo concerts there, as part of his almost yearly thanksgiving concert ritual. While the Tour was still ongoing, on August 29 and 30, he went back to his hometown Nagasaki and held two open-air concerts at the Mount Inasa Park outdoor stage, with simultaneous public viewing free of charge for 50,000 Nagasaki citizens at the nearby Nagasaki Baseball Stadium (commonly known as the Big N to locals). Official figures announced a final audience count of 80,000 for the Mount Inasa concerts and Big N public viewing, in just over the two days alone.

The master ringtone (Chaku Uta) download of his song "Hatsukoi" began on November 6, 2009. It sold about 150,000 downloads in five days, and, on November 13, 2009, it was announced that the song would be released as a physical CD single on December 16, 2009. The single debuted at number 1 on the Oricon weekly charts, with sales of around 151,000 copies in the first week of the release. He performed "Hatsukoi" at the 60th NHK Kōhaku Uta Gassen on New Year's Eve 2009, his first appearance at the event since 1993 and joined John Woo's upcoming film Manhut.

On November 3, 2023, it was announced that he would voice King Magnifico in the Japanese dubbing of the Disney film Wish.

== Radio career ==
Fukuyama started his career as a radio personality in 1991. From 1992 until 2015, he presented a weekly slot on the long-running talk show All Night Nippon on Nippon Broadcasting System. His broadcasts were known for risqué jokes such as, "I am the Son of the Wank God! Phallo Maximus!!" (私はオナニーの神の子！マラ・ダンコーネ！！- a self-deprecating parody of grandiose claims made by anime heroes), and "'Standing ovation' has a naughty vibe to it, doesn't it?" Fukuyama has stated that he doesn't enjoy dirty jokes in everyday life, but considers them an essential part of the radio format.

As of April 2025, Fukuyama presents regular programmes on Chiteijin Radio and Tokyo FM.

== Personal life ==
Fukuyama is the son of hibakusha, survivors of the atomic bombing of Nagasaki. He has been active in preserving trees that survived the bombing.

Fukuyama married fellow actor Kazue Fukiishi on September 28, 2015, the same day as her birthday. He announced his marriage just after the close of stock trading to minimize the impact on stock prices, but the stock price of his agency Amuse plummeted by 500 yen (9.4%) on the 29th, the largest drop since August 2013, and his market capitalization fell by 4.1 billion yen (closing price) in one day. (Note: この日は日本株が急落し、TOPIX終値は前日比63.15ポイント (4.4%) 安の1375.52で、アミューズの下落率はこの2倍に近かった。) Many women left work early, were absent from work, or were unable to work due to housework or other reasons. This was reported as the "Fukuyama shock" and "Masha loss."

The couple's first child was born on December 22, 2016.

On the April 10, 2021 broadcast of his radio programme "Fuku Radio," he stated that he had been raising two rescue cats, Ore-chan and Tora-chan, for the past three years.

== Discography ==
- Dengon (1990)
- Lion (1991)
- Bros. (1991)
- Boots (1992)
- Calling (1993)
- On and On (1994)
- Sing a Song (1998)
- F (2001)
- 5 Nen Mono (2006)
- Zankyō (2009)
- Human (2014)
- Tama Riku (2015)
- Akira (2020)
- Supernova (2026)

== Filmography ==
=== Films ===
Year	Title	Role	Notes	Ref.
1988	Hon no 5g	Sanzō Hashimoto		
1996	Atlanta Boogie	Radio DJ		
2008	Suspect X	Manabu Yukawa	Lead role	
2009	Amalfi: Rewards of the Goddess	Shōgo Saeki	Special appearance	
2011	Doraemon: Nobita and the New Steel Troops—Winged Angels	Masaaki Fukuyama (voice)		
2011	Andalusia: Revenge of the Goddess	Shōgo Saeki	Special appearance	
2013	Midsummer's Equation	Manabu Yukawa	Lead role	
2013	Like Father, Like Son	Ryōta Nonomiya	Lead role	
2014	Rurouni Kenshin: Kyoto Inferno	Hiko Seijūrō		
2014	Rurouni Kenshin: The Legend Ends	Hiko Seijūrō		
2016	Scoop!	Shizuka Miyakonojō	Lead role	
2017	The Third Murder	Tomoaki Shigemori	Lead role	
2017	Manhunt	Satoshi Yamura	Lead role; Chinese film	
2018	Mirai	Young Man (voice)		
2019	At the End of the Matinee	Satoshi Makino	Lead role	
2020	Last Letter	Kyōshirō Otosaka		
2022	Silent Parade	Manabu Yukawa	Lead role	
2022	Butt Detective: Shiriarty	Professor Shiriarty (voice)		
2023	Looking for Antonio Inoki	Narrator	Documentary	
2025	Black Showman	Takeshi Kamio	Lead role	
2025	The Last Man: The Movie – First Love	Hiromi Minami	Lead role	

=== Japanese dub ===
Year	Title	Role	Notes	Ref.
2023	Wish	King Magnifico		

=== TV dramas ===
Year	Title	Role	Notes	Ref.
1991	Ashita ga Aru Kara	Ryōichi Wakamura		
1992	Ai wa Dōda	Makoto Yazawa		
1992	Homework	Shūji Takimoto		
1993–97	Under the Same Roof	Masaya Kashiwagi	2 seasons	
1995	Itsuka Mata Aeru	Shinichi Konno	Lead role	
1998	Meguri Ai	Shuji Nakata	Lead role	
1999	Furuhata Ninzaburō	Gaku Hori	Episode 8, season 3	
1999	Perfect Love	Taketo Kusunoki	Lead role	
2003	The Beauty or the Beast	Hiromi Nagase	Lead role	
2003	Tengoku no Daisuke e	Yōhei Iida	Lead role; Television film	
2007–13	Galileo	Manabu Yukawa	Lead role; 2 seasons	
2008	Galileo: Episode Zero	Manabu Yukawa	Lead role; Television film	
2010	Ryōmaden	Sakamoto Ryōma	Lead role; Taiga drama	
2016	Love Song	Kōhei Kamishiro	Lead role	
2019	Everyone's Demoted	Hiroshi Kataoka	Lead role	
2022	The Forbidden Magic	Manabu Yukawa	Lead role; Television film	
2023	The Last Man: The Blind Profiler	Hiromi Minami	Lead role	

=== Radio ===
Year	Title	Role	Notes	Ref.
2015–present	Fukuyama Masaharu: Fuku no Radio	Host		
2017–present	Masaharu Fukuyama and Akihisa Souguchi's Chiteijin Radio	Host		
2020–present	Jet Stream	Host		

== Guitar collection ==
Acoustic guitars

- Gibson J-50 (1959) - recording, songwriting, Hatsukoi PV
- Gibson J-45 (1947)
- Gibson J-45 (1968)
- Gibson J-200 (1959) - bought this on first trip to the US
- Gibson LG-1 (1968)
- Gibson B-45-12 (1962)
- Gibson Hummingbird (1969) - recording, songwriting etc
- Martin OOO-28 (1968) - Hotaru PV
- Martin D-28 (1979)
- Martin D-45 (1979)
- Martin Cowboy III (2001)
- Martin OO-18DBCY Signature Edition (Yoshikawa Chuei model)(2002)
- Martin GPCPA-1
- Martin The Backpacker Guitar
- Don Musser 1994 - very limited numbers produced
- George Lowden Model 038
- Gretsch 6022 Rancher (1955) - Hello PV
- Alhambra W-2
- Larry Pogreba Resonator Guitar
- Jose Ramirez (model unknown)
- K.Yairi 一五一会 (2009.02.06) - (40th) birthday present from Begin, with "M.FUKUYAMA" printed

Electric bass

- Fender Jazz Bass (1965)
- Sugi Original Custom
- Hōfner Vintage63 Violin Bass
- Greco VB-90 SB
- Music Man Sting Ray-4 BCR/RM (2005)

Electric guitars

- Gibson Les Paul Gold Top (1956)
- Gibson Les Paul (1959)
- Gibson Les Paul Custom SG (1962) - KOH+ Saiai PV
- Gibson Les Paul Custom (1970) - Sou ~new love new world~ PV
- Gibson Custom Shop Duane Allman Signature Les Paul "Pilot Run" (2004)
- Gibson Custom Shop Jimi Hendrix Psychedelic Flying V - Keshin PV
- Gibson Custom Shop 50th Anniversary Korina Explorer AGED - REDxBLUE live
- Gibson Les Paul Special (1989)
- Gibson Les Paul Junior-TV (1960)
- Gibson Eric Clapton Crossroad ES-335
- Gibson Custom Shop John Lennon Les Paul Junior - ON AND ON live, Michishirube tour
- Fender Stratocaster (1956)
- Fender Custom Shop Stratocaster - recording and live performances
- Fender Custom Shop The Eric Clapton Blackie Stratocaster - recording and live performances
- Fender Custom Shop 58 Stratocaster Closet Classic - (40th) Birthday Present from Kuwata Keisuke
- Fender Telecaster Pink Paisley (1968) - inspiration for "phantom" came from this guitar's sound
- Fender Telecaster - Revolution//Evolution live
- Fender Jazz Master (1962)
- Fender Jazz Master (1965) - 99 live
- Gretsch 6120 Chet Atkins Hollow Body (1959)
- Gretsch 6122 Chet Atkins Country Gentleman (1966)
- Gretsch G6129T-1957 Silver Jet - Asahi Super Dry CM
- Gretsch 6186 Clipper (1966)
- Paul Reed Smith Modern Eagle (20th Anniversary)
- Paul Reed Smith Private Stock #1728 Custom 24
- Paul Reed Smith Private Stock #2751 Custom 24
- Rickenbacker 350 JG (1989) - Kokoro colour ~a song for a wonderful year~ PV
- Aria-Pro II PE-R100 (1981) - his first guitar purchased in high school
- James Tyler Studio Elite Chameleon
- ESP Angel Classic V - the 'wings" that Takamizawa-san (THE ALFEE) gave him after Shin Domoto Kyoudai

== See also ==
- List of best-selling music artists in Japan
