= Mr. Children discography =

- Studio albums: 20
- Live albums: 1
- Compilation albums: 7
- Singles: 38

The discography for the Japanese band Mr. Children consists of 20 studio albums, 7 compilation albums and 38 singles. They are one of the best selling artists in Japan.

Mr. Children debuted in 1992. The band's initial releases performed poorly on the charts but through word of mouth they gained more popularity. Their 4th single "Cross Road" after 22 weeks sold over a million copies, though released in 1993 and peaked at number five on the Oricon chart. It later managed to become the fifteenth best selling single in Oricon's 1994 yearly charts.

The band's first No.1 single on Oricon chart was their 5th single "Innocent World" which was released in June, 1994, becoming the best selling single of 1994 and winning the Japan Record Award (Record of the year) in 1994. The band also released their 6th single "Tomorrow Never Knows" on November 10, 1994. The single solidified the group's popularity with its sales, managing to sell over 2.7 million copies which is the seventh highest-selling single in Japan in Oricon history. and becoming the band's highest selling single to date.

In 1996, they released their 10th single "Namonaki Uta" (名もなき詩) which became the best-selling single of 1996. The single went on to become Japan's highest first week selling single of all time for 15 years, with 1.2 million copies.

On the Oricon album charts their 12th studio album Home became the best-selling album of 2007 in Japan, making it the first time Mr.Children had topped annual album charts in their 16th year since their debut.

In December 2008, they released album Supermarket Fantasy, which became the second best selling album of 2009.

In 2012 they celebrated their 20th debut anniversary by releasing dual best album titled Mr. Children 2001–2005 ＜micro＞ and Mr. Children 2005–2010 ＜macro＞. Both albums dominated the best-selling album category in the 2012 Oricon yearly chart. Mr.Children has become the third artists who achieved TOP two spots on the yearly album ranking, and this is the first time in 14 years for any artist to achieve this. Furthermore ［(An Imitation) Blood Orange］, which is the studio album released in the same year, sold over 530,000 copies in the first week. They had three albums in Top 10 best selling album in 2012.

== Studio albums ==
Year	Album details	Peak chart position	First week sales	Total sales/RIAJ certifications (sales thresholds)	International sales
1992	Everything: Released: May 10, 1992; Label: Toy's Factory (TFCC-88020); Format: CD	25	2,400	451,440 (Platinum)	
1992	Kind of Love: Released: December 1, 1992; Label: Toy's Factory (TFCC-88026); Format: CD	13	7,770	1,179,780 (Million)	
1993	Versus: Released: September 1, 1993; Label: Toy's Factory (TFCC-88034); Format: CD	3	58,510	802,140 (Million)	
1994	Atomic Heart: Released: September 1, 1994; Label: Toy's Factory (TFCC-88052); Format: CD	1	851,560	3,429,650 (3x Million)	
1996	Shinkai (深海): Released: June 24, 1996; Label: Toy's Factory (TFCC-88077); Format: CD	1	1,536,180	2,744,950 (2x Million)	HKG: 20,000
1997	Bolero: Released: March 5, 1997; Label: Toy's Factory (TFCC-88099); Format: CD	1	1,734,880	3,283,270 (3x Million)	HKG: 20,000
1999	Discovery: Released: February 3, 1999; Label: Toy's Factory (TFCC-88137); Format: CD	1	1,110,370	1,814,180 (Million)	
2000	Q: Released: September 27, 2000; Label: Toy's Factory (TFCC-88166); Format: CD	2	632,350	896,890 (Million)	
2002	It's a Wonderful World: Released: May 10, 2002; Label: Toy's Factory (TFCC-86106); Format: CD	1	640,150	1,232,655 (Million)	
2004	Shifuku no Oto (シフクノオト): Released: April 7, 2004; Format: CD, CD+DVD	1	803,422	1,411,799 (Million)	
2005	I Love U (I♥U): Released: September 21, 2005; Label: Toy's Factory (TFCC-86200); Format: CD	1	686,688	1,137,349 (Million)	
2007	Home: Released: March 14, 2007; Label: Toy's Factory (TFCC-86221); Format: CD, CD+DVD; Note: Best-selling album of the year in 2007	1	693,038	1,207,417 (Million)	
2008	Supermarket Fantasy: Released: December 10, 2008; Label: Toy's Factory (TFCC-86291, TFCC-86292); Format: CD, CD+DVD	1	707,763	1,277,906 (Million)	
2010	Sense: Released: December 1, 2010; Label: Toy's Factory (TFCC-86341); Format: CD	1	501,992	784,282 (Triple Platinum)	
2012	(An Imitation) Blood Orange: Released: November 28, 2012; Label: Toy's Factory (TFCC-86420, TFCC-86421); Format: CD, CD+DVD	1	530,235	775,713 (Triple Platinum)	
2015	Reflection: Released: June 4, 2015; Label: Toy's Factory (TFCC-86543, TFCC-86544, TFCC-86545); Format: CD, CD+DVD	1	355,268	587,108 (Double Platinum)	
2018	Jyuryoku to Kokyu (重力と呼吸, "Gravity and Respiration"): Released: October 3, 2018; Label: Toy's Factory (TFCC-86659); Format: CD	1	309,956	446,128 (Double Platinum)	
2020	Soundtracks: Released: December 2, 2020; Label: Toy's Factory (TFCC-86733, TFCC-86734, TFCC-86735, TFJC-38044); Format: CD, CD+DVD, CD+Blu-ray, vinyl	1	278,506	(Platinum)	
2023	Miss You: Released: October 4, 2023; Label: Toy's Factory; Format: CD	1	164,988	(Gold)	
2026	Ubugoe (産声): Released: March 25, 2026; Label: Toy's Factory; Format: CD	1	148,771	(Gold)	

== Compilations ==
Year	Album details	Peak chart position	First week sales	Total sales/RIAJ certifications (sales thresholds)
2001	Mr. Children 1992–1995: Released: July 11, 2001; Label: Toy's Factory (TFCC-88180); Format: CD	1	1,201,730	2,403,348 (2x Million)
2001	Mr. Children 1996–2000: Released: July 11, 2001; Label: Toy's Factory (TFCC-88181); Format: CD	2	1,004,190	1,824,634 (2x Million)
2007	B-Side: Released: May 10, 2007; Label: Toy's Factory (TFCC-86231); Format: CD	1	281,024	479,320 (Double Platinum)
2012	Mr. Children 2001–2005 ＜micro＞: Released: May 10, 2012; Label: Toy's Factory (TFCC-86396, TFCC-86398); Format: CD, CD+DVD; Note: No.2 best-selling album of the year in 2012	2	715,556	1,116,782 (Million)
2012	Mr. Children 2005–2010 ＜macro＞: Released: May 10, 2012; Label: Toy's Factory (TFCC-86397, TFCC-86399); Format: CD, CD+DVD; Note: Best-selling album of the year in 2012	1	731,589	1,215,909 (Million)
2022	Mr. Children 2011–2015: Released: May 11, 2022; Label: Toy's Factory; Format: CD	2	185,020	
2022	Mr. Children 2015–2021 & Now: Released: May 11, 2022; Label: Toy's Factory; Format: CD	1	193,007	

== Live albums ==
Title	Release date	Peak chart position	First week sales	Copies sold
1/42	September 8, 1999	1	411,080	559,310

== Singles ==
Title	Release date	Peak chart position	First week sales	Copies sold	Album
"Kimi ga Ita Natsu" (君がいた夏; The Summer That You Were Here)	August 21, 1992	69	2,940	21,710	Everything
"Dakishimetai" (抱きしめたい; I Want To Hold You)	December 1, 1992	56	3,490	60,790	Kind of Love
"Replay"	July 1, 1993	19	24,880	88,330	Versus
"Cross Road"	November 10, 1993	6	65,950	1,255,940	Atomic Heart
"Innocent World"	June 1, 1994	1	206,030	1,935,830	Atomic Heart
"Tomorrow Never Knows"	November 10, 1994	1	669,540	2,766,290	Bolero
"Everybody Goes -Chitsujo no Nai Gendai ni Drop-Kick-" (EVERYBODY GOES -秩序のない現代にドロップキック-, Everybody goes - A drop kick in this disorderly modern world -)	December 12, 1994	1	369,670	1,240,040	Bolero
"【Es】 ~Theme of Es~"	May 10, 1995	1	520,670	1,571,890	Bolero
"See-Saw Game ~Yūkan na Koi no Uta~" (シーソーゲーム～勇敢な恋の歌～ :See Saw Game ~a brave love song )	August 10, 1995	1	561,750	1,811,790	Bolero
"Na mo Naki Uta" (名もなき詩 :Nameless Poem)	February 5, 1996	1	1,208,230	2,308,790	Shinkai
"Hana -Mémento Mori-" (花 -Mémento-Mori-; Flower ~a Reminder of Death)	April 10, 1996	1	639,330	1,538,600	Shinkai
"Machine Gun o Buppanase -Mr. Children Bootleg-" ((マシンガンをぶっ放せ -Mr.Children Bootleg-; Spray Machinegun Fire)	August 8, 1996	1	301,560	733,070	Shinkai
"Everything (It's You)"	February 5, 1997	1	602,140	1,217,090	Bolero
"Nishi e Higashi E" (ニシエヒガシエ :To the East, To the West)	February 11, 1998	1	361,370	663,730	Discovery
"Owari Naki Tabi" (終わりなき旅 :Endless Journey)	October 21, 1998	1	515,780	1,070,350	Discovery
"Hikari no Sasu Hou E" (光の射す方へ :To Where the Light Points You)	January 13, 1999	1	327,650	455,770	Discovery
"I'll Be"	May 12, 1999	1	194,770	301,000	Discovery
"Kuchibue" (口笛 :Whistle)	January 13, 2000	1	327,590	724,070	Q
"Not Found"	August 9, 2000	1	356,520	607,300	Q
"Yasashii Uta" (優しい歌 :Gentle Song)	August 21, 2001	1	250,610	477,810	It's a Wonderful World
"Youthful Days"	November 7, 2001	1	352,730	699,270	It's a Wonderful World
"Kimi Ga Suki" (君が好き :I like you)	January 1, 2002	1	305,500	513,280	It's a Wonderful World
"Any"	July 10, 2002	1	257,670	509,262	Shifuku no Oto
"Hero"	December 11, 2002	1	315,358	552,848	Shifuku no Oto
"Tenohira"/"Kurumi" (掌/くるみ :Palm of hand/Walnut)	November 19, 2003	1	286,982	651,696	Shifuku no Oto
"Sign"	May 26, 2004	1	370,451	773,990	I Love U
"Yonjigen: Four Dimensions" (四次元-)	June 29, 2005	1	569,116	925,632	I Love U
"Houkiboshi" (箒星 :Comet)	July 5, 2006	1	254,024	419,805	Home
"Shirushi" (しるし :*Proof)	November 15, 2006	1	350,059	740,080	Home
"Fake" (フェイク)	January 24, 2007	1	280,877	320,628	Home
"Tabidachi no uta" (旅立ちの唄 :A song for the journey)	October 31, 2007	1	238,380	395,343	Supermarket Fantasy
"Gift"	July 30, 2008	1	194,144	340,132	Supermarket Fantasy
"Hanabi" (Fireworks)	September 3, 2008	1	260,196	485,803	Supermarket Fantasy
"Inori ~Namida no Kidou/End of the Day/Pieces" (祈り 〜涙の軌道(Prayer~The orbit of tears)/End of the day/pieces )	April 18, 2012	1	174,409	275,640	(An Imitation) Blood Orange
"Ashioto ~Be Strong" (足音 ～Be Strong)	November 19, 2014	2	114,667	175,192	Reflection
"Hikari no Atelier" (ヒカリノアトリエ)	January 11, 2017	1	100,170	161,749	Non-album single
"himawari"	July 26, 2017	1	121,279	162,415	Jyuryoku to Kokyu
"Birthday/Kimi to Kasaneta Monologue" (Birthday/君と重ねたモノローグ)	March 4, 2020	2	67,777	98,844	Soundtracks

== Home video ==
Title	VHS release date	DVD release date
Es Mr. Children in Film	December 15, 1995	—
Alive	April 25, 1997	—
Regress or Progress '96–'97 Document	September 10, 1997	—
Regress or Progress '96–'97 Tour Final in Tokyo Dome	October 8, 1997	June 21, 2001
Mr. Children Concert Tour '99 Discovery	June 21, 2001	June 21, 2001
Mr. Children Concert Tour Q 2000~2001	August 22, 2001	August 22, 2001
Mr. Children Concert Tour Popsaurus 2001	January 1, 2002	January 1, 2002
Wonederful World on Dec 21	—	March 26, 2003
Mr. Children Tour 2004 Shifuku no Oto (Tour 2004 シフクノオト)	—	December 21, 2004
Mr. Children Dome Tour 2005 "I Love U": Final in Tokyo Dome	—	May 10, 2006
Mr. Children Home Tour 2007	—	November 14, 2007
Mr. Children Home Tour 2007: In the Field	—	August 6, 2008
Mr. Children: Shūmatsu no Confidence Songs	—	November 11, 2009
Mr. Children Dome Tour 2009: Supermarket Fantasy	—	May 10, 2010
Mr. Children: Split the Difference	—	November 10, 2010
Mr.Children TOUR 2011 "SENSE"	—	Nov 23, 2011
Mr.Children STADIUM TOUR 2011 SENSE -in the field-	—	April 18, 2012
Mr.Children TOUR POPSAURUS 2012	—	Dec 19, 2012
Mr.Children［(an imitation) blood orange］Tour	—	Dec 18, 2013

== Commercial tie-ins ==
Commercial ties-ins include:

- Yazakisougyou commercials ("Kimi no Koto Igai wa Nani mo Kangaerarenai")
- Theme of Omae to Ore no Good Luck, Shōnan Bakusōzoku soundtrack ("Niji no Kanata E")
- Gurikopokkii commercials ("Replay")
- Theme of Dousoukai ("Cross Road")
- Aquaerius Ioshisu commercials ("Innocent World")
- Theme of Wakamono no Subete ("Tomorrow Never Knows")
- Theme of Pure, Airial commercials ("Na mo Naki Uta")
- Nissan Foods Buruubaado commercials ("Mata Aeru Kana")
- Theme of Koi no Bakansu ("Everything (It's you)")
- Theme of Kira Kira Hikaru ("Nishi e Higashi E")
- Theme of Naguru Onna ("Owarinaki Tabi")
- Shiseido Sea Breaze commercials ("I'll Be")
- Theme of Bus Stop ("Not Found")
- Asahi Inryo Wonda commercials ("Yasashii Uta")
- Theme of Antique ("Youthful Days")
- Theme of Koufuku no Ojii ("Drawing")
- Asahi Inryo Wonda commercials ("Sosei")
- NTT DoCoMo commercials ("Any, Hero, Kurumi, Paddle")
- Theme of Orange Days ("Sign")
- Pocari Sweat commercials ("Mirai")
- Theme of Ponkikkiizu and GachaGachaPon ("Yooidon")
- Theme of Fly, Daddy, Fly ("Running High")
- Nissin Cup Noodle no Border commercials ("And I Love You", "Bokura no Oto", "Tagatame")
- Theme of NTV's 2006 FIFA World Cup broadcasting, Toyota Tobira wo Akeyou commercials ("Houkiboshi")
- Theme of Koufuku na Shokutaku ("Kurumi")
- Theme of 14-year-old Mother ("Shirushi")
- Theme of Dororo ("Fake")
- Olympus E-416 commercials ("Irodori")
- Theme of Koizora ("Tabidachi no uta")
- Theme of NHK Beijing Olympic&Paralympic2008 ("GIFT")
- Theme of Code Blue & Code Blue 2 ("HANABI")
- Insert song of Code Blue 2 ("Koe", "Kaze to Hoshi to Moebius no wa" )
- Theme of ONE PIECE FILM STRONG WORLD ("Fanfare")
- Theme of BBC documentary, “Life -Inochi wo tsunagu monogatari-“ ("Sosei")
- CM song of Shisedo「MAQuillAGE」 ("Gift", "Esora")
- CM song of Kirin Lemon ("Youthful Days")
- CM song of Sumimoto life insurance ("Sign")
- Theme of Bokura ga ita ("Inori ~Namida no kidou")
- Theme of Bokura ga ita 2 ("Pieces")
- Opening Theme of Mezamashi TV ("Happy song")
- Theme of 18×2 Beyond Youthful Days ("Traveller of Memories")
