= List of best-selling singles in 1995 (Japan) =

This is a list of the best-selling singles in 1995 in Japan, as reported by Oricon.

Ranking	Single	Artist	Release	Sales
1	"Love Love Love"	Dreams Come True	July 24, 1995	2,352,000
2	"Wow War Tonight"	H Jungle with t	March 15, 1995	2,103,000
3	"Hello"	Masaharu Fukuyama	February 6, 1995	1,871,000
4	"Tomorrow Never Knows"	Mr. Children	November 10, 1994	1,836,000
5	"See-Saw Game (Yūkan na Koi no Uta)"	Mr. Children	August 10, 1995	1,792,000
6	"Hello, Again (Mukashi Kara Aru Basho)"	My Little Lover	August 21, 1995	1,736,000
7	"Kiseki no Hoshi"	Keisuke Kuwata & Mr. Children	January 23, 1995	1,717,000
8	"Tomorrow"	Mayo Okamoto	May 10, 1995	1,665,000
9	"Robinson"	Spitz	April 5, 1995	1,594,000
10	"Love Phantom"	B'z	October 11, 1995	1,588,000
11	"Crazy Gonna Crazy"	TRF	January 1, 1995	1,587,000
12	"Es (Theme of Es)"	Mr. Children	May 10, 1995	1,571,000
13	"Negai"	B'z	May 31, 1995	1,498,000
14	"Love Me, I Love You"	B'z	July 7, 1995	1,393,000
15	"Masquerade"	TRF	February 1, 1995	1,389,000
16	"Knockin' On Your Door"	L⇔R	May 3, 1995	1,345,000
17	"La・La・La"	Maki Ohguro	February 20, 1995	1,338,000
18	"Motel"	B'z	November 21, 1994	1,316,000
19	"Zurui Onna"	Sharam Q	May 3, 1995	1,314,000
20	"Going Going Home"	H Jungle with t	July 19, 1995	1,259,000
21	"Everybody Goes (Chitsujo no Nai Gendai ni Drop Kick)"	Mr. Children	December 12, 1994	1,240,000
22	"Totsuzen"	Field of View	July 24, 1995	1,223,000
23	"Maicca"	East End X Yuri	February 13, 1995	1,132,000
24	"Single Bed"	Sharam Q	October 21, 1994	1,122,000
25	"Anata Dake o (Summer Heartbreak)"	Southern All Stars	July 17, 1995	1,118,000
26	"Thank You"	Dreams Come True	February 22, 1995	1,068,000
27	"Overnight Sensation"	TRF	March 8, 1995	1,063,000
28	"Wanderer's Song"	Miyuki Nakajima	May 19, 1995	1,035,000
29	"Aoi Usagi"	Noriko Sakai	May 10, 1995	982,000
