= Mr. Children 1996–2000 =

Compilation album by Mr. Children
- Released: July 11, 2001
- Recorded: 1996–2000
- Genre: Pop rock, power pop, progressive rock, alternative rock
- Length: 72:38
- Label: Toy's Factory
- Producer: Mr. Children; Takeshi Kobayahi

Mr. Children chronology
Mr. Children 1992–1995 (2001)	Mr. Children 1996–2000 (2001)	IT'S A WONDERFUL WORLD (2002)

Mr. Children 1996–2000, is a compilation album by Mr. Children, released on July 11, 2001.

This is a compilation of selected album and single tracks from 1996 to 2000, released on the same day as Mr. Children 1992–1995. It is the eleventh best-selling album of 2001 in Japan, according to Oricon.

== Track listing ==
1. 名もなき詩(Namonaki Uta) – 5:31
2. 花 -Memento-Mori- – 4:49
3. Mirror – 3:02
4. Everything (It's you) – 5:24
5. ALIVE – 6:43
6. ニシエヒガシエ(Nishi e Higashi e) – 5:00
7. 光の射す方へ(Hikari no sasu hō e) – 6:53
8. 終わりなき旅(Owarinaki Tabi) – 7:09
9. ラララ(La la la) – 5:23
10. Tsuyogari (つよがり) – 5:10
11. Kuchibue (口笛) – 5:50
12. NOT FOUND – 4:56
13. Hallelujah – 6:47
