= List of Oricon number-one singles of 1994 =

The following is a list of Oricon number-one singles of 1994.

== Oricon Weekly Singles Chart ==
Issue date	Song	Artist(s)	Ref.
January 3	"Romance no kamisama"	Komi Hirose	
January 10	"Romance no kamisama"	Komi Hirose	
January 17	"Romance no kamisama"	Komi Hirose	
January 24	"Winter Song"	Dreams Come True	
January 31	"Romance no kamisama"	Komi Hirose	
February 7	"Oh My Little Girl"	Yutaka Ozaki	
February 14	"Kono ai ni oyogi tsukarete mo/Boy"	Zard	
February 21	"Don't leave me"	B'z	
February 28	"Don't leave me"	B'z	
March 7	"Don't leave me"	B'z	
March 14	"Tada nakitaku naru no"	Miho Nakayama	
March 21	"Hey Hey ōkini maido ari"	SMAP	
March 28	"GAMBA ranakucha ne"	Lindberg	
April 4	"It's Only Love"	Masaharu Fukuyama	
April 11	"It's Only Love"	Masaharu Fukuyama	
April 18	"It's Only Love"	Masaharu Fukuyama	
April 25	"It's Only Love"	Masaharu Fukuyama	
May 2	"Nights of the Knife"	TMN	
May 9	"Wherever You Are"	Dreams Come True	
May 16	"Wherever You Are"	Dreams Come True	
May 23	"Natsu o dakishimet"	Tube	
May 30	"Sora to Kimi no Aida ni"	Miyuki Nakajima	
June 6	"survival dance (no no cry more)"	TRF	
June 13	"Innocent World"	Mr. Children	
June 20	"Sekai ga Owaru made wa..."	Wands	
June 27	"Sekai ga Owaru made wa..."	Wands	
July 4	"Hitomi Sorasanaide"	Deen	
July 11	"Innocent World"	Mr. Children	
July 18	"Rusty Nail"	X Japan	
July 25	"Rusty Nail"	X Japan	
August 1	"Miss you"	Miki Imai	
August 8	"Hello, My Friend"	Yumi Matsutoya	
August 15	"Heart"	Chage and Aska	
August 22	"Konna ni soba ni iru no ni"	Zard	
August 29	"Hello, My Friend"	Yumi Matsutoya	
September 5	"SPY"	Noriyuki Makihara	
September 12	"VIRGIN BEAT"	Kyosuke Himuro	
September 19	"Ganbarimasho"	SMAP	
September 26	"Itoshisa to Setsunasa to Kokoro Zuyosa to"	Ryōko Shinohara with t.komuro	
October 3	"True Blue"	Luna Sea	
October 10	"Itoshisa to Setsunasa to Kokoro Zuyosa to"	Ryōko Shinohara with t.komuro	
October 17	"Eien no yume ni mukatte"	Maki Ohguro	
October 24	"Sutekina tanjōbi/Watashi no daijina hito"	Chisato Moritaka	
October 31	"TENCA o torō! -Uchida no yabō-"	Yuki Uchida	
November 7	"Haru yo, koi"	Yumi Matsutōya	
November 14	"Suki/Kizuite yo"	Dreams Come True	
November 21	"Tomorrow never knows"	Mr. Children	
November 28	"Meguri Ai"	Chage and Aska	
December 5	"Motel"	B'z	
December 12	"Tomorrow never knows"	Mr. Children	
December 19	"Tomorrow never knows"	Mr. Children	
December 26	"Everybody goes"	Mr. Children	
