= List of Oricon number-one singles of 1995 =

The following is a list of Oricon number-one singles of 1995.

== Oricon Weekly Singles Chart ==
Issue date	Song	Artist(s)	Ref.
January 2	"Tabun Alright"	SMAP	
January 9	"Tabun Alright"	SMAP	
January 16	"Seiten o Homerunara Yugure o Mate"	ASKA	
January 23	"Crazy Gonna Crazy"	TRF	
January 30	"Crazy Gonna Crazy"	TRF	
February 6	"Kiseki no Hoshi"	Keisuke Kuwata & Mr. Children	
February 13	"Masquerade"	TRF	
February 20	"Hello"	Masaharu Fukuyama	
February 27	"Secret Night"	Wands	
March 6	"La・La・La"	Maki Ohguro	
March 13	"Kansha Shite"	SMAP	
March 20	"Overnight Sensation"	TRF	
March 27	"Wow War Tonight"	H Jungle with t	
April 3	"Wow War Tonight"	H Jungle with t	
April 10	"Wow War Tonight"	H Jungle with t	
April 17	"Wow War Tonight"	H Jungle with t	
April 24	"Wow War Tonight"	H Jungle with t	
May 1	"Wow War Tonight"	H Jungle with t	
May 8	"Wow War Tonight"	H Jungle with t	
May 15	"Knockin' On Your Door"	L⇔R	
May 22	"Es (Theme of Es)"	Mr. Children	
May 29	"Es (Theme of Es)"	Mr. Children	
June 5	"Tabibito no uta"	Miyuki Nakajima	
June 12	"Negai"	B'z	
June 19	:"Shiyō yo"	SMAP	
June 26	:"Shiyō yo"	B'z	
July 3	"Mirai no tame ni"	DEEN	
July 10	"Tomorrow"	Mayo Okamoto	
July 17	"Love Me, I Love You"	B'z	
July 24	"Love Me, I Love You"	B'z	
July 31	"Anata Dake o (Summer Heartbreak)"	Southern All Stars	
August 7	"Love Love Love"	Dreams Come True	
August 14	"Longing"	X Japan	
August 21	"See-Saw Game (Yūkan na Koi no Uta)"	Mr. Children	
August 28	"See-Saw Game (Yūkan na Koi no Uta)"	Mr. Children	
September 4	"See-Saw Game (Yūkan na Koi no Uta)"	Mr. Children	
September 11	"Sayonara wa ima mo kono mune ni imasu"	Zard	
September 18	"Donna ii koto"	SMAP	
September 25	"Hello, Again (Mukashi Kara Aru Basho)"	My Little Lover	
October 2	"Hello, Again (Mukashi Kara Aru Basho)"	My Little Lover	
October 9	"Joy to the love (globe)"	Globe	
October 16	"Message"	Masaharu Fukuyama	
October 23	"Love Phantom"	B'z	
October 30	"thrill"	Tomoyasu Hotei	
November 6	"Romance"	Dreams Come True	
November 13	"Oretachi ni asu wa aru"	SMAP	
November 20	"Desire"	Luna Sea	
November 27	"Desire"	Luna Sea	
December 4	"To Love You More"	Celine Dion with Kryzler & Kpmpany	
December 11	"To Love You More"	Celine Dion with Kryzler & Kpmpany	
December 18	"Chase the Chance"	Namie Amuro	
December 25	"To Love You More"	Celine Dion with Kryzler & Kpmpany	
