= List of Oricon number-one albums of 1999 =

These are the Oricon number one albums of 1999, per the Oricon Albums Chart.

== Chart history ==
Key
†	Indicates best-selling album of 1999

Issue Date	Album	Artist(s)	Sales
11 January	A Song for ××	Ayumi Hamasaki	548,210
18 January	A Song for ××	Ayumi Hamasaki	169,570
25 January	People Of The World	J-Friends	503,610
1 February	A Song for ××	Ayumi Hamasaki	103,800
8 February	A Song for ××	Ayumi Hamasaki	86,320
15 February	Discovery	Mr. Children	1,110,370
22 February	Kahala Compilation	Tomomi Kahala	424,030
1 March	Eien	Zard	613,130
8 March	H	Hitomi	248,620
15 March	H	Hitomi	120,890
22 March	First Love †	Hikaru Utada	2,026,870
29 March	First Love †	Hikaru Utada	717,610
5 April	SA	Ami Suzuki	1,058,510
12 April	Every Best Single +3	Every Little Thing	1,007,670
19 April	First Love †	Hikaru Utada	428,520
26 April	First Love †	Hikaru Utada	222,230
3 May	The Monster	Dreams Come True	571,610
10 May	Hide Tribute Spirits	Various Artists	384,180
17 May	First Love †	Hikaru Utada	298,360
24 May	First Love †	Hikaru Utada	258,780
31 May	ID	Nanase Aikawa	513,210
7 June	Zard Best the Single Collection: Kiseki	Zard	1,307,020
14 June	Zard Best the Single Collection: Kiseki	Zard	766,120
21 June	Zard Best the Single Collection: Kiseki	Zard	298,330
28 June	Zard Best the Single Collection: Kiseki	Zard	184,650
5 July	Greatest Hits 1990-1999	Tomoyasu Hotei	513,810
12 July	Ark	L'Arc-en-Ciel	1,533,110
19 July	Ark	L'Arc-en-Ciel	293,190
26 July	Brotherhood	B'z	1,019,270
2 August	Viva La Revolution	Dragon Ash	804,190
9 August	Viva La Revolution	Dragon Ash	319,730
16 August	C Album	KinKi Kids	451,230
23 August	C Album	KinKi Kids	138,180
30 August	"Lucky" 20th Century, Coming Century To Be Continued...	V6	152,370
6 September	No Doubt	Chage & Aska	152,030
13 September	Golden Best	Yosui Inoue	109,240
20 September	1/42	Mr. Children	411,080
27 September	Zard Best: Requested Memorial	Zard	902,420
4 October	Cruise Record 1995-2000	Globe	1,664,330
11 October	Maximum Collection	MAX	456,070
18 October	Cruise Record 1995-2000	Globe	183,820
25 October	Yuzuen	Yuzu	506,370
1 November	Heavy Gauge	Glay	1,569,290
8 November	Heavy Gauge	Glay	305,390
15 November	Colorado	Tina	151,330
22 November	Loveppears	Ayumi Hamasaki	1,201,870
29 November	Loveppears	Ayumi Hamasaki	241,620
6 December	Loveppears	Ayumi Hamasaki	178,600
13 December	The Very Best	Celine Dion	134,830
20 December	Magnum Collection 1999 "Dear"	Masaharu Fukuyama	373,790
27 December	Recycle: Greatest Hits of Spitz	Spitz	578,630

== Annual ==
- Number-one album of 1999: First Love by Hikaru Utada.
- Most weeks at number-one: Ayumi Hamasaki with a total of 7 weeks.

== See also ==
- 1999 in music
