= Innocent World =

Single by Mr. Children

from the album Atomic Heart, 1/42, Mr. Children 1992–1995, and B-Side
- Released: June 1, 1994
- Genre: Pop rock
- Length: 13:31
- Label: Toy's Factory
- Songwriter: Kazutoshi Sakurai
- Producer: Takeshi Kobayashi

Mr. Children singles chronology
"Cross Road" (1993)	"Innocent World" (1994)	"Tomorrow Never Knows" (1994)

"Innocent World" is the fifth single by Japanese rock band Mr. Children, released on June 1, 1994, by Toy's Factory. This was their first single in about seven months since their previous work, "Cross Road," and its release came at a time when their popularity had risen incrementally due to the long-term success of their aforementioned previous single. "Innocent World" served as the advertising jingle for Coca-Cola Japan's "Aquarius Iosis" beverage.

== Background and production ==
The initial tentative title for the song was "innocent blue". The lyrics were intended to be polished into a love song like their third single "Replay," and the opening line of the song was "I'm a little tired". Takeshi Kobayashi was the one who suggested changing "blue" to "world". Unlike their previous singles, the song has a strong message, incorporating objective satire rather than romantic sentiments.

The off-vocals for the song were swiftly completed, but Kobayashi thought that this would be a turning point for Mr. Children, and he decided that the lyrics that Kazutoshi Sakurai had written should be "something that only Sakurai could write, including the clownish parts of him," and "the lyrics should be meaningful only because Kazutoshi Sakurai sings them. What is the meaning of the lyrics?" As a result, the lyrics could not be easily completed. However, on the way home, while driving near Waseda Street on Loop Route 7, the lyrics suddenly came to Sakurai, and he stopped the car and repeatedly took notes, which he then used as the basis for completing the lyrics at home. Sakurai thought, "This is a song for a commercial, and I wonder if I can sing about something so personal." However, the members and Kobayashi both praised the song, and the lyrics were accepted as they were.

After completing the vocals, the tie-up was abruptly cancelled due to "political issues". However, the group was not pessimistic, as they were convinced that the new song would open up a new career for them, and the tie-up was suddenly reactivated about a month later, although the circumstances were unclear.

The blue record sleeve for the CD single was chosen because the song's tentative title was "innocent blue". The art director was Mitsuo Shindō.

== Chart performance ==
"Innocent World" sold 206,030 copies in its first week, becoming their first single to reach No. 1 on the Oricon Weekly Singles Chart. Less than two months later, its sales surpassed 1 million copies and became the best performing single in Japan of 1994, while also being certified Million by the RIAJ. The success of this single also created a great synergistic effect, as it brought their previous works back on the chart. In the end, "Innocent World" sold 1,935,830 copies, making it the third highest-selling single by Mr.Children, after the 6th single "Tomorrow never knows" and the 10th single "Namonaki Uta".

On the annual karaoke chart, it was ranked No. 1 for two consecutive years in 1994 and 1995.

On May 10, 2018, the song was made available on various streaming services; in June 2021, it surpassed 30 million streams and was certified Silver; in July 2022, it surpassed 50 million streams and was certified Gold.

== Awards ==
"Innocent World" won a myriad of accolades including the "Grand Prix" (analogous to Record of the Year from the Grammy Awards) at the 36th Japan Record Awards, however the members were absent from the award ceremony due to shooting the music video for "Tomorrow never knows" in Australia, which was very unorthodox at the time. When the group won the Grand Prix again in 2004 for their 26th single "Sign", all the members attended the ceremony. "Innocent World" also won "Best 5 Single Award" at the 9th Annual Japan Gold Disc Awards, and the "Silver Award" at the 13th Annual JASRAC Awards.

== Track listing ==
All tracks are written by Kazutoshi Sakurai.

No.	Title	Length
1.	"Innocent World"	5:48
2.	"My confidence song"	1:55
3.	"Innocent World (Instrumental Version)"	5:48

== Personnel ==
- Kazutoshi Sakurai – vocals, guitar
- Kenichi Tahara – guitar
- Keisuke Nakagawa – bass
- Hideya Suzuki – drums

== Production ==
- Producer – Kobayashi Takeshi
- Arrangement - Mr. Children and Takeshi Kobayashi

== Charts ==
=== Weekly charts ===
Chart (1994)	Peak position
Japan Weekly Chart (Oricon)	1

=== Year-end charts ===
Chart (1994)	Peak position
Japan Yearly Chart (Oricon)	1

=== All-time chart ===
Chart	Peak position
Japan (Oricon)	26

== Certification and sales ==
Region	Certification	Certified units/sales
Japan (RIAJ)	Million	1,935,830
Streaming
Japan (RIAJ)	Gold	50,000,000^{†}
^{†} Streaming-only figures based on certification alone.

Preceded by "Mugonzaka" (Kaori Kozai)	Japan Record Award Grand Prix; 1994	Succeeded by "Overnight Sensation: Jidai wa Anata ni Yudaneteru" (TRF)
