= Mr. Children 2001–2005 micro =

Mr. Children 2001–2005 <micro>

Compilation album by Mr. Children
- Released: May 10, 2012
- Recorded: 2001–2005
- Genre: Pop rock, power pop, progressive rock, alternative rock
- Label: Toy's Factory
- Producer: Takeshi Kobayashi; Mr. Children

Mr. Children chronology
Sense (2010)	Mr. Children 2001–2005 <micro> (2012)	Children 2005–2010 <macro> (2012)

Mr. Children 2001–2005 <micro> is a compilation album by Japanese rock band, Mr. Children, released on May 10, 2012 along with Mr. Children 2005–2010 <macro>.

The compilation contains singles and album tracks which were released from 2001 to 2005, except one of the four A-sides of "Yonjigen: Four Dimensions", "Yooi Don". It debuted at number 2 on the Oricon Albums Chart, with 716,000 copies sold in the first week, concurrently with Mr. Children 2005–2010 <macro>, which reached number 1 on the same chart. In 2012, this album was the No.2 best-selling album, with 1.1 million copies sold. Besides, Mr. Children 2005–2010 <macro> was the best-selling album in 2012, with 1.16 million copies sold.

== Track listing ==
1. Yasashii Uta (優しい歌)
2. youthful days
3. Kimi ga Suki (君が好き)
4. Sosei (蘇生)
5. Drawing
6. Itsudemo Emi wo (いつでも微笑みを)
7. Any
8. HERO
9. Tagatame (タガタメ)
10. Tenohira (掌)
11. Kurumi (くるみ)
12. Sign
13. and I love you
14. Mirai (未来)
15. Running High (ランニングハイ)
