= (An Imitation) Blood Orange =

[(An Imitation) Blood Orange]

Studio album by Mr. Children
- Released: November 28, 2012
- Genre: Pop rock; power pop
- Label: Toy's Factory
- Producer: Takeshi Kobayashi; Mr. Children

Mr. Children chronology
Mr. Children 2005–2010 <macro> (2012)	[(An Imitation) Blood Orange] (2012)

[(An Imitation) Blood Orange] is the fifteenth studio album by Japanese pop rock band Mr. Children and was released on November 28, 2012. It was the band's first studio album in two years. The album consists of a total of 11 tracks, including their triple A-side single, "Inori: Namida no Kidou" / "End of the Day" / "Pieces", released in April 2012, as well as "Hypnosis". "Joutoku" was used as the theme song for Ikuta Toma's drama Osozaki no Himawari: Boku no Jinsei, Renewal and their charity digital single "Kazoe Uta", released in April 2011, for victims of the 2011 Tōhoku earthquake and tsunami. This album was released in two versions: a limited CD+DVD edition and a regular CD-only edition, but the same price. The limited edition comes with a DVD including the PVs for "Hypnosis", "Marshmallow Day", "Inori: Namida no Kidou", and "Joutoku".

The album debuted on the Japanese Oricon Chart at number one on December 10, 2012. It sold over 530,235 copies in its first week of release. It was their 15th consecutive album to top the chart, and 12th consecutive studio album to sell over 500,000 copies during its first week. In 2012, they released three albums, including Mr. Children 2001–2005 ＜micro＞ (over 716,000 copies sold in its first week) and Mr. Children 2005–2010 ＜macro＞ (selling over 732,000 copies in the first week), released back on 10 May 2012. All three albums sold over 500,000 copies in their first weeks. It makes them the first band to achieve this feat. Mr. Children is the first group in four years who had three albums that sold over 500,000 copies in their first week of release since Exile did it in 2008 with Exile Love, Exile Catchy Best (released in March 2008), and Exile Ballad Best (released in December 2008).

(An Imitation) Blood Orange was the eighth best-selling album of 2012 in Japan according to the Oricon Yearly Chart, selling 612,507 copies (total sales for two weeks in 2012). All three of the albums released in 2012 finished in the top 10 of Oricon's yearly chart.

== Track listing ==
All songs are written and composed by Kazutoshi Sakurai and arranged by Takeshi Kobayashi and Mr. Children

No.	Title	Length
1.	"Hypnosis" (theme song for Inoue Mao's Tokkan Tokubetsu Kokuzei Choushukan)	5:58
2.	"Marshmallow Day" (CM song for 'MAQuillAGE' by Shiseido)	4:17
3.	"End of the Day"	5:50
4.	"Joutoku" (常套句 ("Idiom"); theme song for the Ikuta Toma drama Osozaki no Himawari ~Boku no Jinsei, Renewal~)	4:05
5.	"Pieces" (theme song for Bokura ga Ita part 2)	6:33
6.	"Imitation no Ki" (イミテーションの木 ("Imitation Tree"))	5:03
7.	"Kazoe Uta" (かぞえうた ("Counting song"); digital charity single for victims of the 2011 Tōhoku earthquake and tsunami)	4:42
8.	"In My Town" (インマイタウン)	5:18
9.	"Kako to Mirai wo Koushin Suru Otoko" (過去と未来と交信する男 ("The man who communicates with the past and the future"))	5:22
10.	"Happy Song"	6:05
11.	"Inori (Namida no Kidou)" (祈り ~涙の軌道 ("Prayer ~Orbit of Tears"); theme song for Bokura ga Ita part 1)	5:43

=== DVD track listing ===
Limited edition

1. "Hypnosis"
2. "Marshmallow Day"
3. "Inori (Namida no Kidou)"
4. "Joutoku"
