= Namonaki Uta =

Single by Mr. Children

from the album Shinkai
- Released: February 5, 1996
- Genre: Pop rock, progressive rock
- Label: Toy's Factory
- Songwriter(s): Kazutoshi Sakurai
- Producer(s): Takeshi Kobayashi

Mr. Children singles chronology
| "See-Saw Game (Yūkan na Koi no Uta)" (1995) | "Namonaki Uta" (1996) | "Hana (Mémento Mori)" (1996) |

"Namonaki Uta (名もなき詩, Nameless Poem)" is the tenth single by Mr. Children, released by Toy's Factory on February 5, 1996. The cover of the single is Kazutoshi Sakurai's face whose tongue was written "no name". "Namonaki Uta" was used as the theme song of Japanese television drama Pure.

On the Japanese Oricon weekly chart, the single "Namonaki Uta" opened at number-one with the first week sales of over 1.208 million copies, establishing the Japanese highest first-week single sales record. It topped the 1996 Oricon yearly single charts and sold over 2.308 million copies in total. It is the second best-selling song for the band behind their 1994 single "Tomorrow Never Knows."

The song was covered by Kohmi Hirose on her 2010 album Drama Songs.

== Track listing ==
All tracks are written by Kazutoshi Sakurai

| No. | Title | Length |
|---|---|---|
| 1. | "Namonaki Uta (名もなき詩)" | 5:30 |
| 2. | "Mata Aeru kana (また会えるかな)" | 4:06 |
| 3. | "Namonaki Uta (Instrumental Version) (名もなき詩 (Instrumental Version))" | 5:30 |
