= Hana (Mémento Mori) =

Single by Mr. Children

from the album Shinkai
- Released: April 10, 1996
- Genre: Alternative rock, pop rock
- Length: 4:45
- Label: Toy's Factory
- Songwriter(s): Kazutoshi Sakurai
- Producer(s): Takeshi Kobayashi

Mr. Children singles chronology
"Namonaki Uta" (1996)	"Hana (Mémento Mori)" (1996)	"Machine Gun o Buppanase (Mr. Children Bootleg)" (1996)

"Hana (Mémento Mori) (花 -Mémento-Mori-)" is the eleventh single by the Japanese rock band Mr. Children.

The song was released as one of the lead-off singles from the album Shinkai on April 10, 1996 on only 500 yen, because its compact disc not contains any B-Sides or Karaoke versions. Like the previous materials, "Hana" also reached number one on the Japanese Oricon singles chart, and remained the peak position for a couple of weeks, selling more than 1.5 million copies.

The Latin subtitle of the song which means "think about the death" was named after the photo book that made songwriter impressed, which was taken and edited by Shinya Fujiwara. When the re-recorded version of the song was featured on B-side of a single "Yasashii Uta" released in 2001, its alternative title was omitted.

== Track listing ==
All tracks are written by Kazutoshi Sakurai.

No.	Title	Length
1.	"Hana (Mémento Mori) (花 -Mémento-Mori-)"	4:45
