= I Love U (Mr. Children album) =

Studio album by Mr. Children
- Released: September 25, 2005
- Genre: Pop rock, power pop
- Length: 64:05
- Label: Toy's Factory
- Producer: Takeshi Kobayashi

Mr. Children chronology
Shifuku no Oto (2004)	I Love U (2005)	Home (2007)

Singles from I Love You
- 1. "Sign" Released: May 26, 2004; 2. "Yonjigen: Four Dimensions" Released: June 29, 2005

I Love U (or I ♥ U, see cover art) is the eleventh studio album by Japanese rock band Mr. Children on September 25, 2005. The album's first single, "Sign", released on May 26, 2004, was used as the theme song for the Japanese television drama, Orange Days. The second maxi single, titled "Yonjigen: Four Dimensions", released on June 29, 2005, contains four A-sides, "Mirai", "And I Love You", "Running High" and "Yooi Don", but it does not including "Yooi Don".

== Sales ==
I Love U this album total sales were 1.137 million copies in RIAJ sales certification, ranking 8th in Japan Oricon Yearly Album Sales Chart in 2005.

== Track listing ==
No.	Title	Length
1.	"Worlds end"	5:33
2.	"Monster"	3:59
3.	"Mirai" (未来 "Future")	5:22
4.	"Bokura no Oto" (僕らの音 "Our Sound")	5:03
5.	"and I Love You"	5:06
6.	"Kutsuhimo" (靴ひも "Shoelace")	4:26
7.	"Candy"	4:45
8.	"Running High" (ランニングハイ)	5:23
9.	"Sign"	5:23
10.	"Door"	2:27
11.	"Tobe" (跳べ "Jump")	6:41
12.	"Hedatari" (隔たり "Distance")	3:53
13.	"Sensui" (潜水 "Diving")	6:04
