= Q (album) =

Studio album by Mr. Children
- Released: September 27, 2000
- Genre: Pop rock, art pop, power pop, progressive rock
- Label: Toy's Factory
- Producer: Mr. Children; Takeshi Kobayashi

Mr. Children chronology
1/42 (1999)	Q (2000)	Mr. Children 1996–2000, Mr. Children 1996–2000 (2001)

Q is the ninth studio album by the Japanese pop rock band Mr. Children, released on September 27, 2000.

Since the beginning of their success in 1994, Q was the first, and so far only, album not to reach No. 1, with Ayumi Hamasaki outselling them by selling 1 million copies in the first week with Duty, while Q only sold 632,000. It was also their lowest selling album since their first successful album, Atomic Heart.

== Track listing ==
1. Center of universe
2. Sono mukou he ikou (Beyond the border)
3. Not Found
4. Slow starter
5. Surrender
6. Tsuyogari
7. 12 gatsu no Central Park blues
8. Tomo to coffee to uso to ibukuro
9. Road Movie
10. Everything is made from a dream
11. Kuchibue
12. Hallelujah
13. Yasurageru basho
