= AP Bank =

Japanese nonprofit organization

- Formation: June 1, 2003; 23 years ago
- Type: NPO for Loaning Finance
- Purpose: Loans for renewable energy and environmental projects
- Headquarters: Tokyo, Japan
- Location: Tokyo
- Official language: Japanese
- President: Takeshi Kobayashi
- Website: www.apbank.jp

AP Bank is a Japanese non-profit organization dedicated to renewable energy and environmental projects, founded in 2003. AP Bank's seed money was provided by record producer Takeshi Kobayashi, musician Kazutoshi Sakurai and composer and musician Ryuichi Sakamoto. It channels its finance to small-scale sustainable projects that would otherwise struggle to receive loan funding. Beneficiaries have ranged from a recycling program in the far south of Kyushu, Japan, to the construction of an eco-resort in the Marshall Islands.

AP Bank holds its own festival since 2005. AP Bank Fes raises awareness about environmental issues such as recycling and global warming, with all profits from the festival going to fund more projects at AP Bank.

== History ==
The concept for AP Bank arose out of a series of seminars in 2002 by the members of composer Ryuichi Sakamoto's Artists Power, a project started in 2001 by Sakamoto and Takuro of Glay to engender more financial responsibility amongst musicians. Seminar organiser and music producer Takeshi Kobayashi invited members to learn from experts about citizen's banks, where money is used according to the depositor's wishes as opposed to regular banks where depositors rarely know how their deposits are used.

Presenter Yu Tanaka, executive director of non-profit organization the Mirai Bank, established in 1994, encouraged the members to start their own citizen's bank in order to invest in wind turbines.

In June 2003 AP Bank was officially founded as a non-profit bank able to offer loan financing, with a goal of tackling environmental problems. It was started with an initial investment of ¥100 million (approx. US$952,000) each from music producer Takeshi Kobayashi, musician Kazutoshi Sakurai and composer Ryuichi Sakamoto. A former manager from one of Japan's largest regular banks, Mitsui Sumitomo also joined as a key member of the team. AP Bank, which operates as a lender with low interest rates, began receiving applications for loans online from May 1, 2004, receiving 75 applications in its first month and granting 14 in its first year worth a total of approximately ¥50 million (US$476,000).

Initial projects were asked to reach requirements such as not lasting longer than 10 years and requiring not more than ¥5 million ($47,600). The annual interest rate was set at 1% and examples of those that were first accepted included a forest revival project in Kagoshima, a bicycle rental service using abandoned cycles in Yokohama, the use of bio-gas from kitchen refuse in Saitama, and the construction of an eco-resort in the Marshall Islands.

"AP Bank" took its name from Sakamoto's Artists Power but also stands for Alternative Power.

AP Bank initially operated only on its founding member's capital, refusing to accept investment from the general public, in order to test the initiative. Funding is generated by regular releases by Sakurai's Bank Band, which performs and releases CDs and DVDs in collaboration with a wide range of guests artists. Further funding is generated by AP Bank's own AP Bank Fes, AP BANG! Tokyo Creators' Meetings and Yoyogi Village.

At the 2008 MTV Video Music Awards Japan on May 31, U2's Bono presented Kazutoshi Sakurai and Kobayashi Takeshi with the 'Rock The World' award for their work creating AP Bank. Bono commented; "I am honored for my message to be passed on here. It is a prize suitable for the party who keeps reciting a wonderful message that all can resonate through rock, named the 'Rock The World Award'". Sakurai accepted, commenting "I think this award could be won thanks to the endorsement of AP Bank by all artists."

On November 18, 2011, Kobayashi opened Yoyogi Village, a mini-town featuring shops by Kurkku, organic restaurants and cafes, a bookstore, travel agent, garden and an all-night music bar. Kobayashi commented that ""There is no philosophy or vision within the government at the moment, so the private sector has to lead when it comes to selling ecology and the economy."

In 2012, AP Bank Fes expanded to three festival sites and was joined by its first international artist, Jason Mraz, a strong supporter of Farm Aid.

== Aims ==
AP Bank's original website stated its purpose as "AP Bank's main loan targets are small businesses that ordinary people can manage, not large business entities. As in the case of renewable energy - often described as "decentralized energy" because it is generated locally - a variety of ideas appropriate to each community are needed to improve its environment. By supporting small projects being attempted by people in their own communities, we hope to encourage more people to think that they can change society through their own efforts. The result will be another, new type of future."

AP Bank is also committed to the idea of "eco-resonance"—fostering eco-awareness.

Kobayashi has described in a 2007 interview with Time that "money for the sake of money isn't great, but money is a tool, and people can use it as a community."

Kazuyuki Tsuchiya of the green group A Seed Japan has said of AP Bank that "I think that because they started this movement, it's helped ordinary folks become aware of environmental problems and finance."

== Key members ==
Takeshi Kobayashi (小林武史, born June 7, 1959, in Shinjo City, Yamagata) is a well-known music producer, lyricist, composer and keyboardist. He is best known for his work with the popular band Mr. Children. In 1996, he teamed up with Shunji Iwai to create the music for the film Swallowtail Butterfly with J-pop singer Chara. He also composed songs for Quentin Tarantino's Kill Bill Vol.1 (2001). Kobayashi is perhaps the most active leader of AP Bank.

Kazutoshi Sakurai (桜井 和寿; born 櫻井 和寿, March 8, 1970, in Tokyo) is primarily known as the lead member and composer for his band Mr. Children. In 2006, Sakurai ranked #8 in HMV's "Top 30 Best Japanese Singers of All Time". In 2009, he was selected as one of the Young Global Leader Honorees at the World Economic Forum.

Ryuichi Sakamoto (坂本 龍一, born January 17, 1952, in Tokyo) is a Japanese musician, activist, composer, record producer, writer, singer, pianist, and actor, based in Tokyo and New York. He began his career in 1978 as a member of the pioneering electronic music group Yellow Magic Orchestra (YMO), where he played keyboards and was an occasional vocalist.

Sakamoto was the originator of the concept of Artists' Power, a project by various artists to promote renewable energy started in 2001. Sakamoto stepped back from regular involvement in AP Bank after its initial set-up due to his living in New York rather than Japan where AP Bank is primarily active.

== Key projects ==
=== AP Bank Fes ===
The first AP Bank Fes took place from July 16 to 18, 2005 in Kakegawa, Shizuoka as a multi-purpose outdoor festival, featuring live performances but also a wide variety of areas to teach about environmental issues such as sustainable development, natural farming and renewable energy issues like solar power. It features a marketplace selling various natural goods as well as relaxation areas and a natural food court. AP Bank Fes encourages the audience to bring their own cutlery to the event, while the waste generated is separated into nine categories so that most can be recycled. AP Bank Fes expanded to three festival sites in 2012, including Hyogo and Miyagi Prefectures.

The main festival site is provided by the Yamaha Corporation and led to an initiative called Japan Natural Energy "Green Power Certificate" to provide "green power" for other music events at the site. It is expected to conserve 500,000 kWh of electricity and reduce 230 tons of CO_{2} emissions per year at the site.

Funds raised from the festival, which attracts around 60,000 people, and resultant CDs and DVDs, are donated to AP Bank. The live shows are structured with Kazutoshi Sakurai's Bank Band as the main performer, featuring various guests vocalists, which have included;

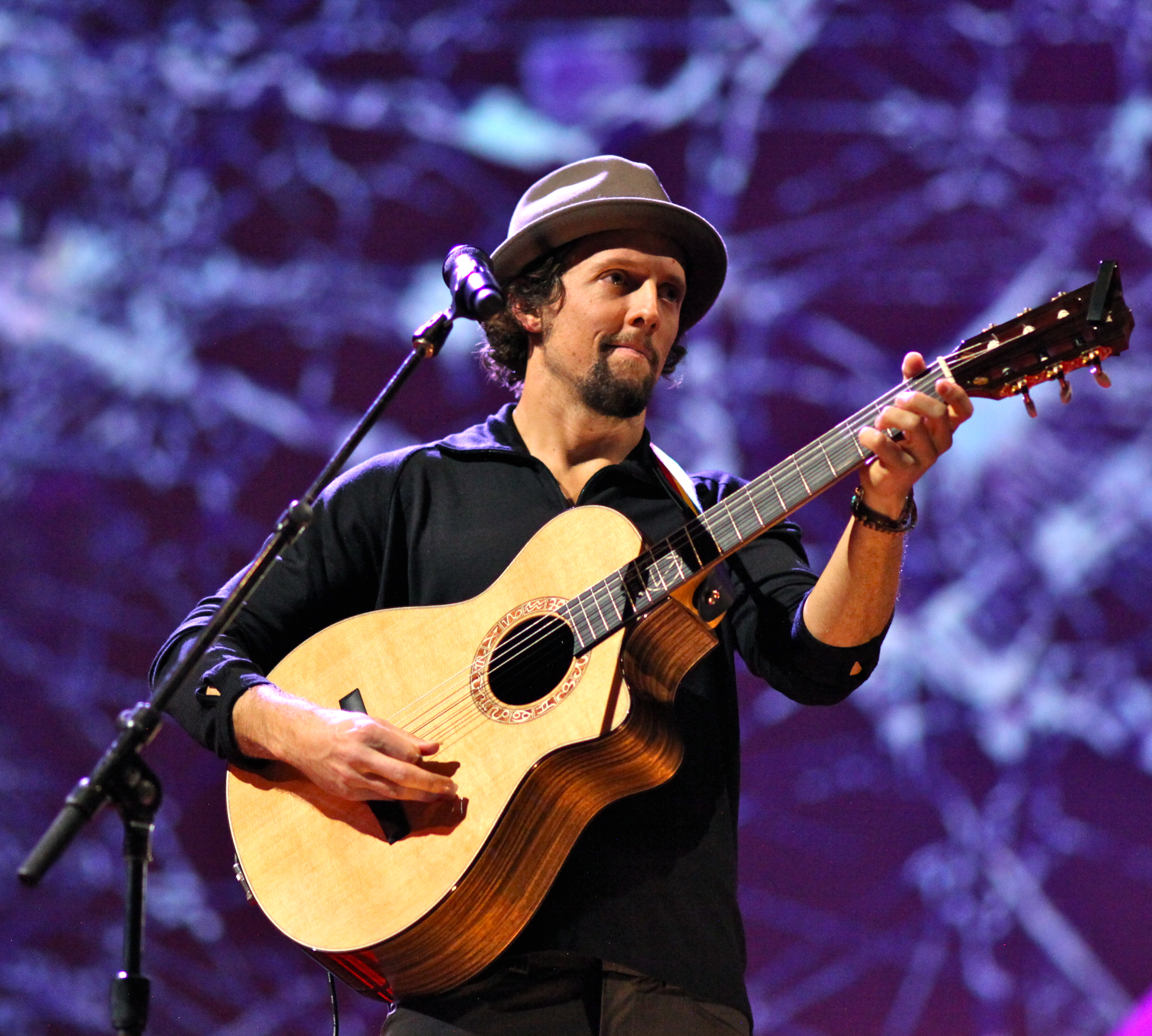
Jason Mraz was the first international artist to perform at AP Bank Fes

- 2005 - Salyu, Chara, Every Little Thing, Hitoto Yo, Tortoise Matsumoto (Ulfuls), Mika Nakashima etc.
- 2006 - Kobukuro, BoA, Bonnie Pink, Miki Imai, Remioromen, Quruli, Kreva etc.
- 2007 - Ai, Depapepe, Ulfuls, ~~Rip Slyme, Kumi Koda, Sukima Switch~~ (cancelled due to typhoon) etc.
- 2008 - Glay, My Little Lover, Ayaka Hirahara, Chihiro Onitsuka, Yuzu, Aska etc.
- 2009 - Juju, Kumi Koda, Yuna Ito, Ai Otsuka, Eikichi Yazawa, Porno Graffitti etc.
- 2010 - Cocco, Mongol800, Puffy, Dragon Ash, Toshinobu Kubota, Funky Monkey Babys etc.
- 2011 - Hitoto Yo, Shikao Suga. Minmi, Naoto Inti Raymi, Sukima Switch, Bonnie Pink etc.
- 2012 - Jason Mraz, Ken Hirai, Crystal Kay, Spitz, Monkey Majik, Def Tech etc.

=== AP BANG! Tokyo Creators' Meeting ===
AP Bank organises an all-night club event for artists, musicians, and other creative people called AP BANG! Tokyo Creators' Meeting. The purpose is to make people think about the environment, through creations and performances for a younger crowd that might typically have less interest or knowledge of environmental concerns. Vol.1 took place over three days at Studio Coast in Shin Kiba, Tokyo, from March 16-18th, 2007 and featured art directors, filmmakers, web designers and copywriters as well as performing acts such as Seamo, Kyōko Koizumi and Ayaka.

=== Eco-reso web ===
AP Bank operates an extensive network of websites and blogs called eco-reso web (エコレゾ ウエブ). Initially a web magazine that communicates about events in Japan and around the world relating to the environment by means of news articles, videos and illustrations, eco-reso web now includes a wide range of web pages on various ecological, environmental, eco-farming and sustainable development issues.

=== Kurkku ===
Kurkku is a Tokyo-based project owning several shops under the theme "future-oriented living that is comfortable and good for the environment". Kurkku sells food and clothing and AP Bank provides conceptual input and assistance. Kurkku's main restaurant and cafe are located in Harajuku. Code kurkku, serving Italian-style food prepared by executive chef Yasuhiro Sasajima, whose Kyoto restaurant Il Ghiottone is said to "serve the finest Italian cuisine in all of Western Japan", and is housed within the Yoyogi Village complex.

=== Yoyogi Village ===
Combining elements of many of AP Bank's projects, Yoyogi Village is perhaps its most open to the general public, aiming to break the perception that environmentally friendly products are bland or boring. It was built in order to reinvigorate Yoyogi on the old site of the 19th century Yoyogi village, before the rise of the neighboring districts Shinjuku and Harajuku led to the areas decline. Yoyogi Village consists of the two zones surrounding a central landscaped garden by Seijyun Nishihata featuring trees from Spain, Chile, Brazil and Mexico.

The village consists of a wide range of stores, cafes and restaurants as well as a travel agent, massage parlor and gardens. The Container Zone is made from old shipping containers and sells fashion from organic cotton farms in India at One Mile Wear, houses the Pour-kur bakery, organic Drink & Soup Kurkku Lab, Roots & Beat Coffee and Tako Yoyogi izakaya and hosts the Blind Gallery.

The Village Zone hosts The Music Bar designed by Kobayashi and fellow producer Shinichi Osawa, VIP areas and the Code Kurkku dining and terrace area with discounted organic food prepared by Kyoto chef Yasuhiro Sasajima. The land in the center of Tokyo has been leased for an initial ten years, with a view to building more villages in the future.

=== AP Bank Fund ===
In July 2007, the Niigata 2007 Chūetsu offshore earthquake hit Japan's Niigata Prefecture, at the same time as the AP Bank Fes'07 music festival was taking place - itself cut from three days to one due to a typhoon. As a result of these two catastrophes, AP Bank Fund was created to provide funds for disaster relief, separate from AP Bank's regular lending operations. The ap bank fund was created in September 2007, and in June 2008 it provided relief funds for victims of the 2007 Chūetsu offshore earthquake, a devastating cyclone in Myanmar, and another major earthquake in Sichuan, China.

== See also ==
- Lists about renewable energy
- Renewable energy commercialization
- Renewable Energy Sources and Climate Change Mitigation
- Solar power in Japan
- Tetsunari Iida
