= Mr. Children 2005–2010 macro =

Mr. Children 2005–2010 <macro>

Compilation album by Mr. Children
- Released: May 10, 2012
- Recorded: 2005–2010
- Genre: Pop rock, power pop
- Label: Toy's Factory
- Producer: Takeshi Kobayashi; Mr. Children

Mr. Children chronology
Mr. Children 2001–2005 <micro> (2012)	Mr. Children 2005–2010 <macro> (2012)	［(An Imitation) Blood Orange］ (2012)

Mr. Children 2005–2010 <macro> is a compilation album by Japanese rock band, Mr. Children, released on May 10, 2012 along with Mr. Children 2001–2005 <micro>.

The compilation contains singles and album tracks which were released from 2005 to 2010. It won the number 1 on the Oricon Albums Chart with 732,000 copies sold in its first week, the most sales in the first week of the albums which were released in 2012. Another compilation, Mr. Children 2001–2005 <micro>, debuted at number 2 on the same chart. In 2012, it was the best-selling album in Japan, with 1.16 million copies sold. Mr. Children 2001–2005 <micro> was the No.2 best-selling album, with 1.1 million copies sold.

== Track listing ==
1. "Worlds End"
2. "Bokura no Oto" (僕らの音)
3. "Hokiboshi" (箒星)
4. "Shirushi" (しるし)
5. "Fake" (フェイク)
6. "Irodori" (彩り)
7. "Tabidachi no Uta" (旅立ちの唄)
8. "Gift"
9. "Hanabi" (花火)
10. "Hana no Nioi" (花の匂い)
11. "Esora" (エソラ)
12. "Fanfare"
13. "Gitai" (擬態)
14. "365 Nichi (Days)" (365日)
