= Shifuku no Oto =

Studio album by Mr. Children
- Released: April 7, 2004
- Genre: Pop rock, power pop, progressive rock
- Label: Toy's Factory
- Producer: Mr. Children; Takeshi Kobayashi

Mr. Children chronology
It's a Wonderful World (2002)	Shifuku no Oto (2004)	I Love U (2005)

Shifuku no Oto (シフクノオト, 'The sound of bliss') is the tenth studio album released by Mr. Children on April 7, 2004, which became the 2nd best selling album in 2004. Its limited edition includes a documentary DVD on the making of the album and an interview with the band. The song "Tagatame" was originally made as a country-style song, but the band re-arranged the song as a rock song because Kazutoshi Sakurai felt that the lyric of the song didn't match the original arrangement.

== Track listing ==
1. "Iwasete Mitee Mon Da" (言わせてみてぇもんだ, "Let You Say")
2. "Paddle"
3. "Tenohira" (掌, "Palm")
4. "Kurumi" (くるみ)
5. "Hana Kotoba" (花言葉, "Flower Language")
6. "Pink ~ Kimyō na Yume" (Pink ～ 奇妙な夢, "- Strange Dream")
7. "Chi no Kuda" (血の管, "Blood Vessel")
8. "Karakaze no Kaerimichi" (空風の帰り道, "Dry Wind's Way Back")
9. "Any"
10. "Tencho Bus" (天頂バス, "Zenith Bus")
11. "Tagatame" (タガタメ)
12. "Hero"
