= Home (Mr. Children album) =

HOME

Studio album by Mr. Children
- Released: March 14, 2007
- Genre: Pop rock, power pop
- Length: 72:20
- Label: Toy's Factory
- Producer: Takeshi Kobayashi

Mr. Children chronology
I Love U (2005)	HOME (2007)	B-SIDE (2007)

HOME is the twelfth studio album by Mr. Children, released on March 14, 2007. Its first press limited edition includes a documentary DVD on the making of the album and live performances by members of the group between recording sessions. The album debuted at the number 1 position, with 693,038 copies sold in the first week.

Its first single Houkiboshi (箒星) was used as the theme song for a series of Toyota commercials. The second single, Shirushi (しるし), used as the theme song to the Japanese television drama, Jyūyonsai no Haha (14才の母), was the seventh best selling single, with over 550,000 copies sold in 2006. The last single, Fake (フェイク), released on January 24, 2007, was used as the theme song to the live-action film adaptation of Osamu Tezuka's Dororo. A promotional video was created for Irodori (彩り) to promote the album and the song was also used for the Olympus E-410 commercials. Four songs from the HOME sessions are not included on the album, Hokorobi (ほころび) and my sweet heart are included as B-sides on the Houkiboshi (箒星), while Hibiki (ひびき) and Kurumi - for the Film - Koufuku na Shokutaku (くるみ - for the Film - 幸福な食卓) are found on the Shirushi (しるし) single. The B-sides are also available on their B-SIDE compilation.

Mr. Children held 14 concerts in support of the album, known as the HOME Tour, from May 4, 2007 to June 23, 2007. They visited 7 cities in Japan. They performed songs from the album, as well as a selection of their old songs were in their tour. Another tour, known as HOME -in the field-, was held from August 4, 2007 - September 30, 2007. A previously unreleased song, Tabidachi no Uta (旅立ちの唄) debuted in their second tour.

The cover art features some people swimming in the swimming pool, It generally received favorable reviews by the critics.

HOME is the best selling album in the 2007 Oricon Yearly Album Chart marking their first yearly number 1 position on the charts in their 16th year since their debut. A total of 1,181,241 copies were sold in 2007.

== Track listing ==
1. "Sakebi Inori" (叫び 祈り, "Cry, Prayer")– 1:06
2. "Wake me up!" – 5:52
3. "Irodori" (彩り, "Color") – 5:25
4. "Hokiboshi" (箒星, "Comet") – 5:12
5. "Another Story" – 5:19
6. "Piano Man" – 4:45
7. "Motto" (もっと, "More") – 4:48
8. "Yawarakai Kaze" (やわらかい風, "Soft Wind") – 4:29
9. "Fake" (フェイク) – 4:56
10. "Pocket Castanet" (ポケット カスタネット) – 5:51
11. "Sunrise" – 6:35
12. "Shirushi" (しるし, "Symbol") – 7:12
13. "Toori Ame" (通り雨, "Passing Rain") – 5:26
14. "Anmari Oboete Naiya" (あんまり覚えてないや, "I Don't Remember Much") – 5:24
