= Everything (It's You) =

Single by Mr. Children

from the album Bolero
- Released: February 5, 1997
- Genre: Pop rock, power pop
- Length: 10:47
- Label: Toy's Factory
- Songwriter(s): Kazutoshi Sakurai
- Producer(s): Takeshi Kobayashi

Mr. Children singles chronology
"Machine Gun o Buppanase (Mr. Children Bootleg)" (1996)	"Everything (It's You)" (1997)	"Nishi e higashi e" (1998)

"Everything (It's You)" is the thirteenth single released by Japanese rock band Mr. Children on February 5, 1997. The song was the theme song of Japanese television drama Koi no Vacance. The single debuted at No. 1 on the Japanese Oricon weekly single charts.

"Everything (It's You)" was certified as a million-selling single by the Recording Industry Association of Japan.

== Track listing ==
All tracks are written by Kazutoshi Sakurai

No.	Title	Length
1.	"Everything (It's You)"	5:23
2.	"Derumo (デルモ)"	5:24
