= Everybody Goes (Chitsujo no Nai Gendai ni Drop Kick) =

Single by Mr. Children

from the album Bolero
- Released: December 12, 1994
- Genre: Pop rock, progressive rock
- Length: 4:38
- Label: Toy's Factory
- Songwriters: Kazutoshi Sakurai, Takeshi Kobayashi
- Producer: Takeshi Kobayashi

Mr. Children singles chronology
"Tomorrow Never Knows" (1994)	"Everybody Goes (Chitsujo no Nai Gendai ni Drop Kick)" (1994)	"Es (Theme of Es)" (1995)

"Everybody Goes (Chitsujo no Nai Gendai ni Drop Kick)" (everybody goes 秩序のない現代にドロップキック) is the seventh single released by Mr. Children on December 12, 1994.

== Overview ==
"Everybody Goes (Chitsujo no Nai Gendai ni Drop Kick)" debuted at No. 1 single on the Oricon Japanese charts and managed to sell 1,240,040 copies during its run on the chart. The title track was not used in any promotional tie-ins and was originally intended to be the b-side of the "Tomorrow Never Knows" single. The song was also included in the Mr. Children live album 1/42, released on September 8, 1999. The b-side "Classmate" (クラスメイト) was included in Mr. Children's compilation album, B-Side, released on May 10, 2007.

== Track listing ==
No.	Title	Lyrics	Music	Length
1.	"Everybody Goes (Chitsujo no Nai Gendai ni Drop Kick) (everybody goes -秩序のない現代にドロップキック-)"	Kazutoshi Sakurai	Kazutoshi Sakurai, Takeshi Kobayashi	4:38
2.	"Classmate (クラスメイト)"	Kazutoshi Sakurai	Kazutoshi Sakurai	5:30
3.	"Everybody Goes (Chitsujo no Nai Gendai ni Drop Kick) (Instrumental Version) (everybody goes -秩序のない現代にドロップキック- (Instrumental Version))"			4:38

== Personnel ==
- Kazutoshi Sakurai – vocals, guitar
- Kenichi Tahara – guitar
- Keisuke Nakagawa – bass
- Hideya Suzuki – drums
- Es sisters - chorus

== Production ==
- Producer – Kobayashi Takeshi
- Arrangement - Mr. Children and Takeshi Kobayashi
- Recorded by - Hiroshi Hiranuma, Kunihiko Imai
- Computer programming - Ken Matsumoto, Yoshinori Kadoya
