= Supermarket Fantasy =

Studio album by Mr. Children
- Released: December 12, 2008
- Genre: Pop rock, power pop
- Length: 69:49
- Label: Toy's Factory
- Producer: Takeshi Kobayashi; Mr. Children

Mr. Children chronology
B-Side (2007)	Supermarket Fantasy (2008)	Sense (2010)

Supermarket Fantasy, is the thirteenth (their official website lists it as the 15th) original studio album by Mr. Children. It earned commercial success and debuted on the Japanese Oricon Chart at rank 1 on December 10, 2008. It sold 707,763 copies in its first week, the second best-selling debut album sales figure of the 2009 Oricon Year, and is still charting as of August 2009. It has 14 tracks, including smash singles "Tabidachi no Uta", "Gift", "Hanabi", and digital single "Hana no Nioi". Songs "Shounen" and "Esora" were used to further promote the album but were not included on any singles, and the album includes "Kaze to Hoshi to Mebiusu no Wa", B-side from the "Gift" single. As of November 25, 2009, Supermarket Fantasy has sold 1,246,962 copies and is currently slated as the second best-selling album of the 2009 Oricon Yearly Chart.

The album generally received favorable reviews from critics.

== Track listing ==
No.	Title	Length
1.	"Shuumatsu no Confidence Song" (終末のコンフィデンスソング Confidence Song of the End)	5:11
2.	"Hanabi" (Fireworks)	5:44
3.	"Esora" (エソラ)	5:06
4.	"Koe" (声 Voice)	4:18
5.	"Shounen" (少年 Boys)	5:38
6.	"Tabidachi no Uta" (旅立ちの唄 Song of the Journey)	5:37
7.	"Kuchi ga Subette" (口がすべって A Slip of the Tongue)	4:14
8.	"Suijou Bus" (水上バス Overwater Bus)	5:06
9.	"Tokyo" (東京)	4:38
10.	"Rock 'n Roll" (ロックンロール)	3:31
11.	"Hitsuji, Hoeru" (羊、吠える Sheep, Howl)	4:41
12.	"Kaze to Hoshi to Mebiusu no Wa" (風と星とメビウスの輪 The Wind, The Stars, and Moebius' Circle)	5:17
13.	"Gift"	5:45
14.	"Hana no Nioi" (花の匂い A Flower's Scent)	5:11

== Yearly charts ==
Supermarket Fantasy

Chart	Position
Oricon (2009)	2

"Hanabi"

Chart	Position
Billboard Japan Download (2017)	8
