= Es (Theme of Es) =

Single by Mr. Children

from the album Bolero
- Released: May 10, 1995
- Genre: Progressive rock, pop rock, symphonic rock
- Label: Toy's Factory
- Songwriter: Kazutoshi Sakurai
- Producer: Takeshi Kobayashi

Mr. Children singles chronology
"Everybody Goes (Chitsujo no Nai Gendai ni Drop Kick)" (1994)	"Es (Theme of Es)" (1995)	"See-Saw Game (Yūkan na Koi no Uta)" (1995)

"Es (Theme of Es)" (officially written 【es】~Theme of es~) is the eighth single released by Mr. Children on May 10, 1995. It debuted at No. 1 on the Japanese Oricon weekly single charts.

Along with their next single "See-Saw Game (Yūkan na Koi no Uta)," "Es (Theme of Es)" was certified as a million-selling single of 1995 by the Recording Industry Association of Japan.

== Track listing ==
All tracks are written by Kazutoshi Sakurai.

No.	Title	Length
1.	"Es (Theme of Es)"	5:52
2.	"Ame nochi hare Remix Version (雨のち晴れ Remix Version)"	9:36
