= Sign (Mr. Children song) =

Single by Mr. Children

from the album I Love U (I♥U)
- Released: May 26, 2004
- Genre: Pop rock, power pop
- Length: 12:19
- Label: Toy's Factory
- Songwriter: Kazutoshi Sakurai
- Producer: Takeshi Kobayashi

Mr. Children singles chronology
"Tenohira/Kurumi" (2003)	"Sign" (2004)	"Yonjigen: Four Dimensions" (2005)

Music video
- "Sign" on YouTube

"Sign" is the twenty-sixth single released by Mr. Children on May 26, 2004. The title track was used as the theme song to the Japanese drama Orange Days and won the 'Song of the Year' award, known as the 'Grand Prize', in addition to the 'Gold Prize' award at the 46th annual Japan Record Awards ten years after the group's win for their 1994 single "Innocent World". The single went on to also win 'Best Theme Song' at the 41st Television Drama Academy Awards and also 'Song of the year' at the 19th Annual Japan Gold Disc Awards. Like their previous single, it debuted at number one with 370,000 copies in its first week. It has sold over 770,000 copies, and became the 2nd best selling single of 2004.

== Track listing ==
All tracks are written by Kazutoshi Sakurai.

No.	Title	Length
1.	"Sign"	5:22
2.	"Mousou mangetsu (妄想満月)"	3:03
3.	"Konna fuu ni hidoku mushiatsui hi (こんな風にひどく蒸し暑い日)"	3:54
