= See-Saw Game (Yūkan na Koi no Uta) =

Single by Mr. Children

from the album Bolero
- Released: August 10, 1995
- Genre: Pop rock, power pop
- Label: Toy's Factory
- Songwriter: Kazutoshi Sakurai
- Producer: Takeshi Kobayashi

Mr. Children singles chronology
"Es (Theme of Es)" (1995)	"See-Saw Game (Yūkan na Koi no Uta)" (1995)	"Namonaki Uta" (1996)

"See-Saw Game (Yūkan na Koi no Uta)" (シーソーゲーム 〜勇敢な恋の歌〜) is the ninth single released by Mr. Children on August 10, 1995. This music video is the parody of Elvis Costello song "Pump It Up". The single debuted at the number-one position on the Japanese Oricon weekly single charts.

Along with their previous single "Es (Theme of Es)," "See-Saw Game (Yūkan na Koi no Uta)" was certified as a million-selling single of 1995 by the Recording Industry Association of Japan. It's the best selling Non tie-up single in Japan.

== Track listing ==
All tracks are written by Kazutoshi Sakurai.

No.	Title	Length
1.	"See-Saw Game (Yūkan na Koi no Uta) (シーソーゲーム 〜勇敢な恋の歌〜)"	4:31
2.	"Fragile (フラジャイル)"	5:10
3.	"See-Saw Game (Yūkan na Koi no Uta) (Instrumental Version) (シーソーゲーム 〜勇敢な恋の歌〜 (Instrumental Version))"	4:31
