= It's a Wonderful World (album) =

Studio album by Mr. Children
- Released: May 10, 2002
- Genre: Pop rock, power pop, progressive rock, alternative rock
- Length: 69:28
- Label: Toy's Factory
- Producer: Mr. Children; Takeshi Kobayashi

Mr. Children chronology
Mr. Children 1996–2000 (2001)	It's a Wonderful World (2002)	Shifuku no Oto (2004)

It's a Wonderful World is the ninth studio album released by Mr. Children, released on May 10, 2002, which marks the tenth anniversary of their first album's release. It peaked at number 1 on Oricon Albums Chart and stayed on the chart for 66 weeks.

== Track listing ==
1. overture - 1:56
2. Sosei (蘇生"Reborn") - 6:08
3. Dear wonderful world - 2:18
4. one two three - 5:00
5. Kawaita kiss (渇いたkiss) - 5:14
6. youthful days - 5:18
7. Fastener (ファスナー, Fasuna) - 4:53
8. Bird Cage - 6:34
9. LOVE Hajimemashita (LOVE はじめました) - 5:22
10. UFO - 5:07
11. Drawing - 5:44
12. Kimi ga Suki (君が好き"I love you") - 4:33
13. Itsudemo Hohoemi wo (いつでも微笑みを) - 3:32
14. Yasashii Uta (優しい歌) - 3:36
15. It's a wonderful world - 4:14
