= Tomorrow Never Knows (Mr. Children song) =

Single by Mr. Children

from the album Bolero
- Released: November 10, 1994
- Genre: Pop rock, power pop, soft rock
- Length: 5:10
- Label: Toy's Factory
- Songwriter: Kazutoshi Sakurai
- Producer: Takeshi Kobayashi

Mr. Children singles chronology
"Innocent World" (1994)	"Tomorrow Never Knows" (1994)	"Everybody Goes (Chitsujo no Nai Gendai ni Drop Kick)" (1994)

"Tomorrow Never Knows" is the sixth single released by Mr. Children on November 10, 1994. The single sold 2.766 million copies and is the eighth-highest-selling single in Japan in the Oricon history.

== Overview ==
"Tomorrow Never Knows" was Mr. Children's second No. 1 single on the Oricon Japanese charts. It sold 2,766,290 copies during its run on the chart. The title track was used as the theme song to the Japanese drama Wakamono no Subete (若者のすべて). It was also included in Mr. Children live album 1/42 released on September 8, 1999, and also Mr. Children 1992–1995, released on July 11, 2001. Further,"Tomorrow Never Knows" was included on Mr. Children's sixth album, Bolero, released on March 5, 1997, as a remix. While the track was noted as a remix, the only thing remixed was drummer Hideya Suzuki re-recording his drumming. On the March 16, 2007, episode of the Japanese music TV show Music Station, Mr. Children mentioned that the song was written while the group was on their Innocent World Tour. The b-side "Love Connection (ラヴ コネクション)" was included in Mr. Children's fourth album, Atomic Heart, released on September 1, 1994.

== Awards and recognition ==
"Tomorrow Never Knows" has won many awards including 'Best Theme Song' at the 3rd Annual Television Drama Academy Awards, the 'Grand Prix Single Award' at the 9th Annual Japan Gold Disc Awards, and 'Best 5 Single Award' at the 9th Annual Japan Gold Disc Awards. "Tomorrow Never Knows" was also voted in 2006 as fans' No. 1 all-time favorite song on Music Station and was listed as the third-highest-selling drama tie-in single in Japan.

== Track listing ==
All tracks are written by Kazutoshi Sakurai.

No.	Title	Length
1.	"Tomorrow Never Knows"	5:10
2.	"Love Connection (ラヴ コネクション)"	5:01
3.	"Tomorrow Never Knows (Instrumental Version)"	5:10

== Personnel ==
- Kazutoshi Sakurai – vocals, guitar
- Kenichi Tahara – guitar
- Keisuke Nakagawa – bass
- Hideya Suzuki – drums

== Production ==
- Producer – Kobayashi Takeshi
- Arrangement - Mr. Children and Takeshi Kobayashi

== See also ==
- Great Ocean Road
