= Bolero (Mr. Children album) =

Studio album by Mr. Children
- Released: March 5, 1997
- Genres: Pop rock; power pop; progressive rock; folk rock
- Label: Toy's Factory
- Producers: Mr. Children; Takeshi Kobayashi

Mr. Children chronology
Shinkai (1996)	Bolero (1997)	Discovery (1999)

Bolero, is Mr. Children's 6th studio album and was released on March 5, 1997. The album debuted at the number-one position on Oricon weekly charts, with the first week sales of over 1,734,000 copies. It sold over 471,000 copies in the next week, but was ranked at No. 2 on Oricon charts, being replaced by Globe's Faces Places.

== Track listing ==
1. "Prologue"
2. "Everything (It's You)"
3. "Time machine ni notte(タイムマシーンに乗って）"
4. "Brandnew my Lover"
5. "【es】 〜Theme of es〜"
6. "See-Saw Game (Yūkan na Koi no Uta)"
7. "Kasa no shita no kimi ni tsugu(傘の下の君に告ぐ)"
8. "ALIVE"
9. "Shiawase no category (幸せのカテゴリー）"
10. "Everybody Goes (Chitsujo no Nai Gendai ni Drop Kick)"
11. "Bolero（ボレロ）"
12. "Tomorrow never knows (remix)"
