= Motel (song) =

Single by B'z
- Released: November 21, 1994
- Genre: Hard rock
- Label: BMG Japan
- Songwriter(s): Koshi Inaba; Tak Matsumoto
- Producer(s): Tak Matsumoto

B'z singles chronology
"Don't Leave Me" (1994)	"Motel" (1994)	"Negai" (1995)

"Motel" is the fifteenth single by B'z, released on November 21, 1994. This song is one of B'z many number-one singles on the Oricon chart. It sold over 1,316,000 copies according to Oricon.

== Usage in media ==
- Miki (Boutique JOY) Commercial Song (#1)

== Track listing ==
1. "Motel"
2. "Hole In My Heart"

== Certifications ==
Region	Certification	Certified units/sales
Japan (RIAJ)	Million	1,000,000^{^}
^{^} Shipments figures based on certification alone.
