= Orange Days (TV series) =

- Genre: Drama
- Created by: Eriko Kitagawa
- Starring: Satoshi Tsumabuki; Kou Shibasaki; Hiroki Narimiya; Miho Shiraishi; Eita
- Country of origin: Japan
- Original language: Japanese
- No. of episodes: 11

Production
- Producer: Ueda Hiroki
- Running time: 46 min. (approx)

Original release
- Network: TBS
- Release: April 11 – June 20, 2004

Orange Days (オレンジデイズ, Orenji Deizu) is a drama series that aired in Japan on TBS in 2004.

== Story ==
Yuuki Kai (Tsumabuki) is a senior at a university studying social welfare psychology and trying to find a job. One day, he encounters a girl, Hagio Sae (Shibasaki), playing the violin, and becomes intrigued. He eventually discovers that she has lost her hearing, and can now only communicate using Japanese Sign Language. Before they reveal what they think about each other, Sae and Kai must overcome a lot of barriers. They both become stronger along the way, finding their goals.

== Cast ==
- Satoshi Tsumabuki as Kai Yuuki - leading role
- Kou Shibasaki as Sae Hagio - heroine
- Manami Konishi as Maho Takagi - Kai's girlfriend, postgraduate student
- Hiroki Narimiya as Shohei Aida - Kai's friend
- Eita as Keita Yashima - Kai's friend
- Miho Shiraishi as Akane Ozawa - Sae's friend
- Yu Yamada as Soyoko Saeki - one of Shohei's girlfriends
- Jun Fubuki as Yuriko Hagio - Sae's mother
- Fumiyo Kohinata as Professor Sakaida
- Juri Ueno as Ayumi Kirishima - Shohei's younger sister
- Ikki Sawamura as Haruki Fujii - pianist, Sae's childhood friend
- Takashi Kashiwabara as Sano
- Masaru Nagai as Toru Kakizaki - violinist who used to belong to the same orchestra as Sae
- Eriko Sato as Arisa - one of Shohei's girlfriend
- Ken Mitsuishi as Iwasaki

== Ratings ==
Episode	Air Date	Subtitle	Ratings
01	2004-Apr-11	The Madonna Who Lost Her Voice	18.1
02	2004-Apr-18	The Beginning of Love	16.0
03	2004-April-25	Your Tears	15.3
04	2004-May-02	My Broken Heart	14.2
05	2004-May-09	An Evening of Secrets	15.7
06	2004-May-16	Her Love	15.6
07	2004-May-23	I Love You	18.8
08	2004-May-30	The Couple That is Bound Together	17.6
09	2004-Jun-06	A Sad Fate	17.9
10	2004-Jun-13	You Are Not Here	17.3
11	2004-Jun-20	Your Voice	23.0
Average	--	--	17.2

Source: Video Research, Ltd.

== Songs ==
Theme Song "Sign" by Mr. Children

OST Tracks by Naoki Satō

- Eternal
- Graceful Heart
- That's Life
- Memoria
- Overcast Sky
- Yo-Yo Comrade
- Liebe
- Anxiety
- As Good As It Gets
- Modest Request
- Precious Seasons
- Sign-Instrumental Version

Other Songs:

- "Shanghai Honey" by Orange Range (Episode 5)
- "Bara no Hana" by Quruli (Episode 10)
- "Gavotte en Rondeau (Violin Piece)"

== Awards ==
41st Television Drama Academy Awards

- Best Actor (Satoshi Tsumabuki)
- Best Scriptwriter (Eriko Kitagawa)
- Best Director (Jiro Shono/ Doi Nobuhiro/ Imai Natsuki)
- Best Cast
- Best Theme Song ("Sign" by Mr. Children)
- Special Award (Orange Days's Sign Language)
