= Discovery (Mr. Children album) =

Studio album by Mr. Children
- Released: February 3, 1999
- Genres: Pop rock, power pop, progressive rock, alternative rock
- Label: Toy's Factory
- Producers: Mr. Children; Takeshi Kobayashi

Mr. Children chronology
| Bolero (1997) | Discovery (1999) | 1/42 (1999) |

Discovery is the seventh original album by Mr. Children, released on February 3, 1999. It peaked at number 1 on Oricon Albums Chart, staying on the chart for 20 weeks.

== Track listing ==
1. Discovery - Discovery
2. Hikari no sasu hō e - To the light
3. Prism - Prism
4. Under shorts - Under Shorts
5. Nishi e higashi e - Go hither and thither
6. Simple - Simple
7. I'll be - I'll be
8. (#)2601 - #2601
9. La la la - La la la
10. Owarinaki tabi - Endless journey
11. Image - Image
