= 1/42 =

Live album by Mr. Children
- Released: September 8, 1999
- Recorded: June 26, 1999, at the Makomanai Ice Arena, Sapporo, Hokkaidō, Japan (except the bonus track "Dakishimetai" recorded at Ginowan Seaside Park, Ginowan, Okinawa, Japan)
- Genre: Pop rock, power pop, progressive rock, alternative rock
- Length: 48:42 (Disc 1); 62:24 (Disc 2)
- Label: Toy's Factory
- Producer: Takeshi Kobayahi

Mr. Children chronology
Discovery (1999)	1/42 (1999)	Q (2000)

1/42 is the only live recorded album for the Japanese band Mr.Children, released as a limited edition with 500,000 units in September 1999.

Its title was derived from the number of the places where the band played on that year's their concert tour entitled Discovery. All tracks were adopted from the live performance at the Makomanai Ice Arena, recorded on July 26, 1999, except for the additional track "Dakishimetai" that was recorded in the gig at the Okinawa Ginowan Seaside Park.

The double album debuted at the position of #1 on the Japanese Oricon albums chart and sold out 7 weeks later from its release. Finally the album was certified RIAJ double-platinum status, selling estimated more than 500,000 copies.

== Track listing ==
- All songs written and composed by Kazutoshi Sakurai

=== Disc one ===
1. "Discovery"
2. "Undershirt"
3. "Namonaki Uta" (名もなき詩)
4. "Prism"
5. "Everything (It's you)"
6. "I'll be"
7. "Hana (花) -Mémento-Mori-"
8. "Simple"

=== Disc two ===
1. "Love Connection"
2. "Dance Dance Dance"
3. "Nishi e Higashi e (ニシエヒガシエ)"
4. "La La La"
5. "Tomorrow never knows"
6. "Owarinaki Tabi (終わりなき旅)"
7. "Hikari no Sasu Hou he (光の射す方へ)"
8. "innocent world"
9. "Image"
10. "Dakishimetai (抱きしめたい)" [Bonus Track]

== Charts and certification ==
Chart (1999)	Peak Position	RIAJ Certification
Japanese Oricon Weekly Albums Chart	1 (1 week)	2xPlatinum
