= Shinkai (album) =

Studio album by Mr. Children
- Released: June 24, 1996
- Genres: Alternative rock; progressive rock; folk rock; art rock
- Length: 52:24
- Language: Japanese
- Label: Toy's Factory
- Producer: Takeshi Kobayashi

Mr. Children chronology
Atomic Heart (1994)	Shinkai (1996)	Bolero (1997)

Shinkai (深海) is the 5th studio album recorded by Japanese rock band Mr. Children, released in June 1996 under the record label Toy's Factory.

After their breakthrough in 1994, Mr. Children yielded eight consecutive chart-topping singles. Three of those hits appeared on the album; "Na mo Naki Uta", "Hana (Mémento-Mori)", and "Machine Gun o Buppanase" — while others were reserved for their subsequent release Bolero in 1997.

Kazutoshi Sakurai, the chief singer-songwriter of the band named the album's working title as Coelacanth (シーラカンス, Shīrakansu), which was misheard by his band-mate as "Shinkai" (lit. "deep sea"). Sakurai, who favored the sound of the phrase, decided to change the title of the album.

Shinkai was a sort of concept album, featuring more insightful compositions and harder-edged sound compared to the band's previous materials. The whole album is played gaplessly, though each track is separated on the CD. They had not anticipated that such an adventurous effort would be a big hit.

Contrary to the group's prediction, Shinkai met with commercial success, although it underperformed its predecessor in cumulative sales. It debuted at number one on the Japanese Oricon chart with first-week sales of over 1.5 million copies, becoming the country's fastest selling album at the time. The album spent 46 weeks on the top 100, selling over 2.7 million units during its chart run. Upon its release, Shinkai was certified double-million by the Recording Industry Association of Japan, for shipments of over 2 million copies.

== Track listing ==
All tracks are written by Kazutoshi Sakurai, arranged by Takeshi Kobayashi and Mr. Children.

No.	Title	Length
1.	"Dive" (Instrumental)	1:36
2.	"Coelacanth (シーラカンス)"	4:40
3.	"Tegami (手紙)"	2:49
4.	"Arifureta Love Story (Danjo Mondai wa Itsumo Mendo da) (ありふれたLove Story〜男女問題はいつも面倒だ〜)"	4:27
5.	"Mirror"	2:58
6.	"Making Songs" (Interlude)	1:07
7.	"Na mo Naki Uta (名もなき詩)"	5:28
8.	"So Let's Get Truth"	1:48
9.	"Rinji News (臨時ニュース)" (Interlude)	0:15
10.	"Machine Gun o Buppanase (マシンガンをぶっ放せ)"	4:26
11.	"Yurikago no Aru Oka kara (ゆりかごのある丘から)"	8:52
12.	"Toriko (虜)"	4:17
13.	"Hana (Mémento-Mori) (花)"	5:28
14.	"Shinkai (深海)"	4:50

== Charts ==
=== Weekly charts ===
Chart	Position
Japanese Oricon Albums Chart	1

=== Year-end charts ===
Chart (1996)	Position
Japanese Albums Chart	6

== Certifications ==
Region	Certification	Certified units/sales
Hong Kong (IFPI Hong Kong)	Platinum	20,000^{*}
Japan (RIAJ)	2× Million	2,745,000
^{*} Sales figures based on certification alone.
