= Mr. Children =

Japanese pop rock band

- Origin: Shibuya, Tokyo, Japan
- Genres: Pop rock; power pop; progressive pop; art rock; folk rock
- Works: Discography
- Years active: 1989–present
- Label: Toy's Factory
- Members: Kazutoshi Sakurai (Vocals); Kenichi Tahara (Guitar); Keisuke Nakagawa (Bass); Hideya Suzuki (Drums)
- Website: mrchildren.jp

Mr. Children (Japanese: ミスターチルドレン, Hepburn: Misutā Chirudoren), commonly referred to by their contracted nickname "Misu-Chiru" (ミスチル), are a Japanese pop rock band formed in 1989. Consisting of Kazutoshi Sakurai, Kenichi Tahara, Keisuke Nakagawa, and Hideya Suzuki, they made their major label debut in 1992. They are one of the best selling artists in Japan and one of the most successful Japanese rock artists, having sold over 50 million records and creating the "Mis-chil Phenomenon" (ミスチル現象) in the mid-1990s in Japan. They held the record for the highest first week sales of a single in Japan for 15 years, with 1.2 million copies of their 10th single "Namonaki Uta" (名もなき詩), have 30 consecutive No. 1 singles, replaced Glay as the all-male band (with 3 or more members) to have the most No. 1 albums on the Oricon charts, and won the Japan Record Award in 1994 for "Innocent World" and in 2004 for "Sign". As of 2026, Mr. Children has published twenty original studio albums and 38 physical singles, along with seven compilations, a live album, and nineteen home video releases.

The band's music is mainly composed and written by lead singer Sakurai, with the exception of the Suzuki-penned songs "Asia" and "#2601" from the albums Atomic Heart and Discovery, and occasional collaborative song writing with producer Takeshi Kobayashi.^{[a]}

In 2012, they celebrated their 20th debut anniversary by releasing dual best albums titled Mr. Children 2001–2005 ＜micro＞ and Mr. Children 2005–2010 ＜macro＞. Both albums dominated the best-selling album category on the 2012 Oricon year-end chart, selling over 2.5 million copies combined. Mr. Children became the third artist to achieve the top two spots on the year-end album ranking, and being the first time in 14 years for any artist to achieve this. Moreover, [(An Imitation) Blood Orange], released in November 2012, debuted at No. 1 on the Oricon Weekly Albums Chart; at the end of the year, all three albums released that year were in the top 10 best-selling albums of 2012.

In 2015, Mr. Children was named No. 1 Concert Mobilization Power Ranking based on the overall number of people who attended their performances during 2015 in Japan, mobilizing 1,119,000 fans (36 concerts).

== History ==
=== 1987–1992 ===
The group's members first met in the year of 1987, when Sakurai, Tahara and Nakagawa were in the Walls, which was originally influenced by the band Echoes. The frontman of Echoes, Jinsei Tsuji, was a political activist, and because of this, the Walls became a political band. Drummer Hideya Suzuki was not an original member of the Walls. When the original drummer departed, the band recruited Suzuki, who went to the same school as the other members. In late 1988, the Walls disbanded, while the remaining members formed Mr. Children in early 1989. The name of Mr. Children supposedly came about during a talk at a dinner where the group thought the word "children" had a nice ring to it, but because they were no longer children themselves, they decided to add Mr. in front of it. They credit this change as a new way they started to look at the group.

After changing their name and overall sound, Mr. Children auditioned at a music club called La Mama, failing to pass the first time, but passing a second audition to play at the club. After playing in the club, they were asked to try and debut as professionals. Mr. Children sent out five demo tapes; all failed to generate record label interest, and the group took a three-month hiatus in 1991. Hideya Suzuki worked as a receptionist at an economy hotel, while Kazutoshi Sakurai worked with his father who owned a construction company. When they returned, the group created a sixth demo tape and caught the attention of Toy's Factory. The label signed the group and had them play as the opening act for the rock group Jun Sky Walkers. It was also during this time that they were introduced to their long-time friend and producer Takeshi Kobayashi. Kobayashi was already known in the music industry as a music composer for Keisuke Kuwata of Southern All Stars and Kyōko Koizumi.

=== 1992–2000 ===
On May 10, 1992, Mr. Children's debut album, Everything, was released and represented the long journey they took to get to this point. Three months later their first single "Kimi ga Ita Natsu" (君がいた夏) was released on August 21, 1992. After the release of the single the group held two tours for the album, both held between September 23, 1992, and November 5 of the same year, the '92 Everything Tour comprising ten and the '92 Your Everything Tour consisting of twelve performances. To cap off the year and lead them into the next, Mr. Children released their second album, Kind of Love and their second single "Dakishimetai" (抱きしめたい) on December 1, 1992. "Dakishimetai" was later used as an insert song for the Japanese drama Pure (ピュア). Shortly after, a new tour called '92–93 Kind of Love Tour started and lasted from December 7, 1992 till January 25, 1993.

In 1993, with the completion of the band's tour they began work on for their third album. The first single of the new year to be released was "Replay", released on July 1, 1993 and used in Glico Pocky (グリコポッキー) commercials. On September 9, 1993 their third album Versus was released but failed to bring the group into the spotlight. They continued on and held a new tour. The '93 Versus Tour was held from September 23 until November 5 and had the band holding nine performances. Shortly after, "Cross Road" was released on November 10, 1993, which was used to promote the Japanese drama Dousoukai (同窓会). The single was not a hit, but through word of mouth "Cross Road" gained popularity and after 22 weeks sold over a million copies and later, though released in 1993, managed to become the fifteenth best-selling single on Oricon's 1994 year-end charts. Sakurai confessed years later as to not liking his works up to this point. According to him:

I thought I had to be like Mr. Children's pop music star. That's why I tried my best to play the role.

On June 1, 1994, a new single called "Innocent World" was released and used a promotional song for the soft drink Aquaerius Ioshisu (アクエリアス イオシス). The single solidified the groups popularity with its sales, managing to sell 1,935,830 copies and becoming the No. 1 single in Oricon's 1994 year-end charts. Afterwards work began on their fourth original album Atomic Heart. The album was released on September 1, 1994 and became the band's highest selling album to date. Due to the huge success the band received from the album and "Innocent World" single, the groups popularity built up creating the "Mis-chil Phenomenon" (ミスチル現象) in Japan.

The band also had Takeshi Kobayashi produce two new tours for them. The first tour, named after the "Innocent World" single was held from September 18 to December 18. The band also released their sixth single "Tomorrow Never Knows" on November 10, 1994 which was used as the theme song to the Japanese drama Wakamono no Subete (若者のすべて). The song was written while the group was on tour, was later voted in 2006 as fans No. 1 all-time favorite song on Music Station, and is currently the third highest selling drama tie-in single in Japan. The next single, "Everybody Goes (Chitsujo no Nai Gendai ni Drop Kick)" (everybody goes -秩序のない現代にドロップキック-) was released on December 12, 1994, though originally intended to be the B-side of "Tomorrow Never Knows". To end the year, "Innocent World" won the Song of the Year award at the 36th annual Japan Record Awards.

In 1995, the second half of the Atomic Heart tour started, lasting from January 1 to February 2. Mr. Children also became involved in charity work, doing a collaboration song with Keisuke Kuwata of Southern All Stars. The single "Kiseki no hoshi" (奇跡の地球) was used as the theme song for the Act Against AIDS campaign, was produced by Mr. Children and written by Kuwata. To promote the single and the campaign, they held a one-month tour from April 18 until May 14, entitled Live UFO '95 Rock Opera "Acoustic Revolution with Orchestra" Kiseki no hoshi (Live UFO '95 Rock Opera "Acoustic Revolution with Orchestra" 奇跡の地球), where the group did cover songs of many English speaking artists such as The Rolling Stones and Bob Dylan. During the tour the group was also filming a documentary/concert movie called Es ~Mr. Children in Film~. It was released in theaters on June 6, 1995, preceded by the group's eight single "Es (Theme of Es)" on May 10, to promote the movie. Two months later the group held an open air tour titled -Hounen Mansaku- Natsu matsuri tour Sora [ku:] (-Hounen Mansaku- 夏祭り1995 空[ku:]) from July 16 to September 10, during which the ninth single, "See-Saw Game (Yūkan na Koi no Uta)" (シーソーゲーム 〜勇敢な恋の歌〜) was released on August 10.

On February 6, 1996 Mr. Children's tenth single "Namonaki Uta" (名もなき詩) was released, to promote the Japanese drama Pure (ピュア) and also for Daio Paper's Elleair (エリエール) commercial. The single went on to become Japan's highest first week selling single of all time (which was later broken by idol group AKB48) and is currently Japan's eighth highest selling drama tie-in single. The success of the single was also a surprise for Sakurai, who admitted to spending very little time writing the song. Two months later, on April 5, 1996 the group's eleventh single "Hana (Mémento Mori)" (花 -Mémento-Mori-) was released, followed by their fifth original album Shinkai (深海) on June 24 and their twelfth single "Machine Gun o Buppanase (Mr. Children Bootleg)" (マシンガンをぶっ放せ -Mr.Children Bootleg-), on August 8. To close the year, the Regress or Progress Tour started and lasted from August 24, 1996 to March 28, 1997. The group visited 14 cities and held 55 concerts.

Mr. Children's 13th single, "Everything (It's You)", was released on February 5, 1997, with the title track used as the theme song to the Japanese drama Koi no Bakansu (恋のバカンス). A month later, on March 5 Bolero, Mr. Children's sixth album was released. Soon after, rumors started of the group disbanding. Sakurai's reply: "The band will dissolve only when we have no more talent and have relationship problems with each other." Yet the group then decided to take some time off. Nakagawa and Suzuki start a side project band called Hayashi Hideo, and joined by Kenji Fujii from My Little Lover and Sawao Yamanaka from The Pillows, went on a club tour.

On February 11, 1998, they released their 14th single "Nishi e Higashi e" (ニシエヒガシエ), theme song to the Japanese drama Kira kira Hikaru (きらきらひかる). The group was still on hiatus during this time and made no live performances to promote the single and did not appear in the music video for the song. Finally on October 21, 1998, Mr. Children officially re-grouped and released their 15th single, "Owarinaki Tabi" (終わりなき旅) with the Japanese drama Naguru Onna (殴る女) using it as their theme song. The song remains a public favorite in voting polls, Oricon citing its inspirational lyrics as the reason.

On January 13, 1999, "Hikari no Sasu Hou E" (光の射す方へ), their 16th single, was released, followed by their seventh album, Discovery, on February 3, 1999. Sakurai compared his approach to the songwriting for the record to surfing:

There is a way of riding on waves, not only on big waves, but also small waves. Look at it to see how to catch it. It's something similar to composing.

Eleven days later they began the Discovery Tour '99, from February 14 to July 12, where the group visited 16 cities and held 42 shows. During the tour, Mr. Children released their 17th single "I'll Be" on May 12, which was used in Shiseido's (資生堂) Sea Breeze commercials. Though originally released on the Discovery album, the song was re-released as a single with a lighter beat. The single was not a success and became Mr. Children's lowest selling single since "Cross Road". During the Discovery Tour '99, an idea for a live album was brought up. It was released as a 500,000 copy limited edition on September 8, 1999 and called 1/42 (referring to one of the 42 shows in the tour). Most of the tracks were recorded on June 16, 1999 at the Makomanai ice arena, while the bonus track "Dakishimetai" was recorded at the Okinawa Ginowan-Shi seaside park.

At the beginning of a new century "Kuchibue" (口笛), released on January 13, 2000 became the group's 18th single. While "I'll Be" failed to be a success, "Kuchibue" proved to be a hit selling 724,070 copies. On August 9, 2000, their 19th single "Not Found" was also used as the theme song to the Japanese drama Bus Stop (バスストップ), followed a month later by their 9th original album Q on September 27, 2000. The band went to New York to record this album, where they re-recorded some of their old indie material and for the first time, producer Takeshi Kobayashi performed with the band on a recording. The cover for the album was shot bought Size, Inc. at the Bonneville Salt Flats in the United States. The album was not a favorite amongst fans for various reasons and became their first album since Atomic Heart to not sell over one million copies. ‘Concert tour Q’ started, visiting 13 cities and holding 35 concerts between October 15, 2000 and February 24, 2001.

=== 2001–2006 ===
In 2001, Mr. Children continued their Q tour, followed by dual "Best Of" albums. Titled Mr. Children 1992–1995 and Mr. Children 1996–2000, they were both released on July 11, 2001. Both albums went on to sell a combined total of 4,034,785 copies. According to an interview done with MTV Japan Sakurai stated the best of albums weren't something they had planned on doing yet. During this time, the group was finishing up work for their new upcoming album and had planned to start promoting singles on it. However it was decided that a best of album was needed and so they were released. Four days following the dual album release, the group launched the ‘Popsaurus’ tour, visiting 10 cities and playing 15 shows, lasting from July 15, 2001 all the way through September 25, 2001. A month into the tour their 20th single "Yasashii uta" (優しい歌) was released and used to promote the Wonda Canned Coffee by Asahi Soft Drinks. Two months after the Popsaurus tour ended, "Youthful Days" was released. Released on November 7, 2001, it was their 21st single and was an insert song for the Japanese drama Antique Bakery. "Youthful Days" debuted at No. 1 on the Oricon Weekly Albums Chart in its first week at retail (ahead of Mr. Moonlight (Ai no Big Band) by Morning Musume, from album 4th Ikimashoi!), and It ended up being their best selling single for the year. The b-side for the single, "Drawing", originally had no commercial tie-in, but two years later was used as the theme song to the 2003 Japanese drama Koufuku no ouji (幸福の王子), Starring former Shibugakitai member Masahiro Motoki.

Mr. Children released their 22nd single "Kimi ga Suki" (君が好き) on New Year's Day of 2002 (January 1), which was used as a show song in the Japanese drama Antique Bakery. Four months later their tenth original album It's a Wonderful World was released on May 10, the groups' tenth anniversary. The release of the album on their 10th anniversary was not something that had originally intended. As the group was wrapping up recording, Sakurai asked if the album could be released in the spring time. While the group and their management was trying to think of how to promote an album in the spring time, they came up with releasing the album on their 10th anniversary. A new tour, titled Mr. Children Tour 2002 Dear Wonderful World was set to begin later that year. The previous single "I'll Be" from the Discovery album was selected to be used as an official theme for the 2002 FIFA World Cup, held in Japan and South Korea. On May 24, 2002 Mr. Children attended the first ever MTV Video Music Awards Japan and topped the awards show by winning 'Video of the Year' for the song "Kimi ga suki", the band also nominated in Best Group Category but losing to Backstreet Boys. Two months after the release of the new album, Mr.Children's 23rd single "Any", was released on July 11, 2002 and used to promote NTT DoCoMo Group 10th Anniversary. The group was not able to properly promote the single. As preparations for the new tour were beginning and promotion for the new single were being done, lead singer Sakurai was hospitalized on July 21, 2002, after a blockage in his cerebellum was detected. The Mr. Children Tour 2002 Dear Wonderful World was canceled and all group activities were put on a temporary hiatus. While recovering, Sakurai wrote a song called "Hero", that was inspired by his hospitalization. The song was released as the group's 24th single on December 11, 2002 and was used in NTT DoCoMo Group 10th Anniversary commercial. The first press version of the single included a DVD where, in addition to a 'Mr. Children 2002 documentary -Hero- that was aired, the singer talked about his hospitalization and inspiration for the song. On November 15, 2002 Mr.Children's website announced the band's return to the stage for a "stew of home pride" with a one night only live, December 21, 2002 the group returned to the stage for a single concert, later released on DVD, titled Wonederful World on Dec. 21.

The group remained quiet for most of 2003. Sakurai helped to launch Artists' Power Bank (AP Bank), a non-profit environmental financial institution, in June. Sakamoto Ryuichi, a well known composer, came up with the initial idea to build a wind-power plant. With the help of Sakurai and music producer Takeshi Kobayashi, their goal later became to invest in environmentally friendly projects, such as renewable energy, and as of 2007, participated in other social issues such as helping the victims of a Chuetsu offshore earthquake in Niigata Prefecture on July 16, 2007. Near the end of the year, Mr. Children re-grouped and released their 25th single "Tenohira/Kurumi" (掌/くるみ). It became their first double a-side single with "Tenohira" receiving no commercial tie-in, and "Kurumi" used to promote NTT DoCoMo (NTTドコモ). The single was a hit and became Mr.Children's best selling single since 2001's "Youthful Days" single.

In 2004, Sakurai started a solo project titled Bank Band, which became a spin-off of AP Bank. As Bank Band, Sakurai released a first album, titled "Soushi Souai" (沿志奏逢), which contained covers of two Mr. Children songs, "Hero" and "Yasashii Uta". Mr. Children released their eleventh album on April 4, 2004, titled "Shifuku no Oto" (シフクノオト), which came with a documentary DVD showing the group working and talking about the concept behind the album. To help promote the album, Mr. Children used the song "Tagatame" (タガタメ) in 'Nissin Cup Noodle – NO Border' commercials and as the 'News 23' theme song. According to Sakurai, "Tagatame" (タガタメ) is

a message song with impact… (that) is carved within the depths of the heart of a person.

In the following month, they released their 26th single, "Sign", on May 26, which was used as the theme song to the Japanese drama Orange Days and went on to win the Song of the Year award at the 46th annual Japan Record Awards ten years after their win for 'Innocent World'.

Most of the 2005 was spent working on a new album. As a solo act, Kazutoshi Sakurai appeared at Golden Circle vol.7 on February 28, 2005. Finally on June 29, 2005 the group released their 27th single "Yojiken Four Dimensions" (四次元 Four Dimensions). The single became a monster hit selling 569,000 copies its first week, and ending with 925,632 copies sold. As a quad a-side single, all four songs had a commercial tie in. "Mirai" (未来) promoted 'Pocari Sweat', "and I love you" promoted 'Nissin Cup Noodle – NO Border', "Running High" (ランニングハイ) became the theme song for the Japanese movie 'Fly Daddy Fly', and "Yooidon" (ヨーイドン) was used as a promotional song for Fuji TV's educational program 'Kodomo bangumi Ponkikkiizu, Gachagachapon'. Even though it was released as a single, it was classified as an album by the Recording Industry Association of Japan. A month later the group attended Kazutoshi Sakurai's 3-day festival 'AP Bank fes’ 05' from July 16, 2005 through July 18, 2005, followed by 'SETSTOCK '05' at Kokuei bihoku kyuuryou park on July 23, 2005 and 'Higher Ground 2005' at Umi no nakamichi kaihinkouen outdoor theater on July 30, 2005. Three months later on September 21, 2005, I Love U (I♥U), Mr.Children’s 12th original album, was released. Two months later Dome Tour 2005 'I Love U' began, running from November 12, 2005 through December 27, 2005 and were only the fourth artist in Japanese history to play at the Osaka, Tokyo, Sapporo, Nagoya and Fukuoka dome's. The tour ended in Tokyo Come where they played to 45,000 fans, bringing the tour total to almost 390,000 fans. By the end of the year the group managed to pass the 45 million mark in sold records.

The first single for 2006, was their 28th single "Houkiboshi" (箒星) released on July 5, 2006 and used as the promotion song for Toyota's "Tobira wo akeyou" commercial and as the theme song to NTV's 2006 FIFA World Cup broadcasting. Due to the groups involvement with AP Bank fes. '06, there were no magazine or radio promotions, and only 3 live performances were done to promote the single. However the commercial tie-in's for the single proved to be a success and "Houkiboshi" was voted No. 3 as the favorite commercial song for 2006 and voted as the favorite winter song heard in the summer. Ten days following the release of 'Houkiboshi', Mr.Children participated in the 3 day festival, AP Bank fes '06, where they performed "Hero", "Strange Chameleon", "Owarinaki tabi", and "Hokiboshi". One month later Mr.Children were special guests at The Mujintou fes. 2006 and performed "Mirai", "Innocent world", "Hokorobi", "Sign", "Owarinaki tabi", "Worlds end", and "Houkiboshi". Shortly after Mr.Children announced a joint tour with fellow Japanese rockers the pillows, known as 'Mr.Children & the pillows new big bang tour ~This is Hybrid Innocent~'. The tour was held from September 26, 2006 through October 11, 2006. On November 15, 2006, the group released their 29th single "Shirushi" (しるし), which was used as the theme song Jyūyonsai no Haha (14才の母), by NTV, a controversial television drama about underage pregnancy. Kazutoshi Sakurai had begun writing the song in February 2006 and finished writing in March 2006. and shot the promotional video in September 2006. One of the b-sides of single was a re-recording of Mr. Children's 2003 song "Kurumi", used as a theme song in the movie Koufuku na Shokutaku (幸福な食卓).

=== 2007-present ===
On January 24, 2007, the band released their 30th single, "Fake" (フェイク), which was used as the theme song for the movie Dororo (どろろ), and while only a limited edition single, brought the group to 26 consecutive No. 1 singles. Shortly after, the 13th original album, Home, was released on March 14, which would become the group's first in almost 13 years to chart at No. 1 for two consecutive weeks. It was also the first Japanese album in 2007 to sell more than a million copies. Work on the record had come to a standstill, during the recording of the song "Houkiboshi", due to a dispute among the group over "Home"'s direction. Producer Kobayashi suggested to make an album that "pays attention to the world with a message".

The album reflected a more personal touch from the group, with "Motto" (もっと) talking about the 9/11 attacks in New York City, and "Anmari oboetenai ya" (あんまり覚えてないや), being inspired by Kazutoshi Sakurai's father who had been sick. The title of the album, Home, was originally going to be titled "Home Made" or "Home Ground", because the group wanted the album to have the meaning that it was made by hand. However, they choose to name it just Home because they felt that by adding another word it would be limiting the idea in mind. Three days after the release of Home, Mr. Children won the awards Best Video of the Year and Best Group Video for the single "Shirushi" at the Space Shower Music Video Awards '07. For the album, the group held two promotional tours. The first half called Mr. Children Home Tour 2007, started on May 4 and lasted until June 23. During the tour, a new compilation album titled B-Side was released on May 10, which was also the group's 15th anniversary. The release of a B-side compilation had been suggested by singer Sakurai while working on Home:

There are so many songs I like very much.

Releasing a public statement on their official site at Toy's Factory, both the group and Sakurai felt that the A-side tracks on their singles had started to dictate and overall theme as to who Mr. Children were as a group. They felt a lot of feelings and desires which have shaped them as a group came from these coupling songs, and thus decided to release them as a compilation album. On May 5, 2007, after the second concert for the first half of the Home tour, drummer Hideya Suzuki injured his hand after accidentally touching a ventilator. He injured his left index finger, which required four stitches and the following two concerts had to be rescheduled. Publicity for the tour reached a high, when they performed in front of a sold-out tour for 15,000 fans at Yokohama Arena on June 7, 2007 and reignited speculation that the Mr.Children phenomenon was alive and well. A second half of the tour to promote 'Home', titled Mr.Children Home Tour 2007 -In the Field- took place from August 4 to September 30. Both tours ended up being a big success for the group, and became the most attended Japan tour in 2007 at 550,000 fans. The main promotional track for the Home album, "Irodori" (彩り), was selected to promote the Olympus E-410. During the E Goes to World campaign, the camera manufacturer had customers submit pictures to create a new promotional video for the song.

On July 10, Mr. Children announced a new song on their website titled "Tabidachi no Uta" (旅立ちの唄). While initially a single release date wasn't issued, the group announced a month later it would be released on October 30, 2007. The title track, "Tabidachi no Uta", was used as a theme song for the Japanese movie Koizora (恋空), and a month later also be used to promote NTT Higashi Nihon. With the release of the single, Mr. Children managed to debut at No. 1 for the week and in return obtained their 27th consecutive No. 1 single. Similar to Jyūyonsai no Haha before, the movie Koizora deals with the struggles of a young girl, involving betrayal, rape and abortion. The group was scheduled to play at the AP Bank fes '07 from July 14 to July 16, but due to a typhoon, the first two days had to be canceled, and only the final day proceeded as planned. With the announcement of the new single, Mr.Children also announced the 'Home' tour 2007 DVD, which was released on November 14, 2007. On December 18, 2007, Oricon announced that Home became their first album to top the year-end album charts since their debut with the sales of 1.18 million copies, surpassing the sales of Kumi Koda's album Black Cherry of 1.02 million copies.

For the beginning of 2008, Sakurai released an album and DVD with his solo project Bank Band, followed a month later by the official announcement of a new song, "Shounen" (少年), used in the NHK Japanese television drama Battery (バッテリー). Afterwards Mr. Children announced the release of two singles. The first, "Gift", released on July 30, 2008, was used as the official theme song to the 2008 Beijing Olympics coverage on NHK. When writing this song, Sakurai focused on the meaning behind the Olympics and wanted to write a song not just for those who win, but for everyone who participates.

The most beautiful sparkling color in the Olympic Games is gold. But I also think there are other colors which are more important and valuable for all the participants.

AP Bank announced that Mr.Children would appear for all 3 days at AP Bank fes '08. Their second single of the year, "Hanabi", released on September 3, 2008, was used as the theme song to the Japanese drama Code Blue, in which Tomohisa Yamashita played a main role. The single "Hanabi" topped the Oricon single charts for two weeks, becoming their 29th consecutive No. 1 single. However, their next single "Hana no Nioi" (花の匂い) became their first download-only single for the music download market. The nun full-track ringtone downloads (Chaku Uta) of the song began on October 1 and the full-track downloads (Chaku Uta Full) began on November 1, 2008. Their studio album Supermarket Fantasy was released on December 10, 2008. Supermarket Fantasy sold about 708,000 copies in its initial week, debuting at the No. 1 position on the Oricon Weekly Albums Chart.

On October 20, 2009, it was announced that Mr. Children produced their first anime theme "Fanfare" for the movie One Piece Film: Strong World. "Fanfare" was digitally released as a non full-track ringtone song (Chaku Uta) on November 16 as a full-track ringtone song (Chaku Uta Full) on December 2, 2009. The song debuted at No. 1 on the RIAJ Digital Track Chart.

On May 10, 2010, Mr. Children released the DVD Mr. Children Dome Tour 2009 Supermarket Fantasy in Tokyo Dome, but it sold about 49,000 copies one day before the official release day, debuting at No. 1 on the Oricon weekly music DVD chart with the one-day sales. It became their seventh consecutive No. 1 music DVD and they tied the records of Arashi and KAT-TUN for having the most consecutive No. 1 DVDs on the Oricon weekly music DVD chart. It also debuted at No. 1 on the Oricon weekly comprehensive DVD chart, eclipsing the sales of Avatar in the week. It topped the Oricon comprehensive DVD charts for three consecutive weeks, making them the second artist to achieve that with the music DVD while the first is Arashi. On September 4, Mr. Children released their second documentary/concert movie Mr. Children / Split the Difference (since first "Es" ~Mr. Children in Film~) and released DVD + CD includes the movie and selected songs by the band on November 10, 2010. It debuted at No. 1 on the Oricon weekly music DVD chart and they also became the first artist to have their eighth consecutive No. 1 music DVD. On December 1, Mr. Children released their sixteenth studio album Sense includes digital release only single "Fanfare". But the details such as track list, number of tracks, cover and title of the album were not announced until just before a release date, November 29.

On April 4, 2011, Mr. Children released the download single "Kazoe Uta" to collect donations for the 2011 Tōhoku earthquake. "Kazoe Uta" debuted at No. 1 on the RIAJ Digital Track Chart, surpassing the download sales of AKB48's charity single "Dareka no Tame ni (What Can I Do for Someone?)".

On April 18, 2012, Mr. Children released the triple A-side single "Inori (Namida no Kidou)/End of the Day/Pieces", their first in three years and seven months; the single debuted at No. 1 on the Oricon Weekly Singles Chart, selling 174,409 copies. Two of the songs, "Inori (Namida no Kidou)" and "Pieces", were used as the themes to the Bokura ga Ita movies. In addition, "Inori (Namida no Kidou)" spent four weeks atop the RIAJ Digital Track Chart, tying the record set by GReeeeN's "Haruka". Also released on April 18 was the band's Mr. Children 2011 Tour Sense: In the Field DVD, which debuted at No. 1 on both the Oricon DVD and Blu-ray charts, making Mr. Children the first artist to top three of Oricon's charts in a single week. On May 10, Mr. Children released a pair of best-of albums titled Mr. Children 2001–2005 ＜micro＞ and Mr. Children 2005–2010 ＜macro＞ in celebration of their 20th anniversary. The band also embarked on a 2-month dome tour, titled "Popsaurus 2012", after the series of concerts they held in 2001 following the release of their first two best-of albums. On November 28, Mr. Children released new album titled (An Imitation) Blood Orange. At the end of the year, Mr. Children monopolized the year-end album ranking, with all three of their albums in the top 10. Their dual best-of albums Mr. Children 2005–2010 ＜macro＞ and Mr. Children 2001–2005 ＜micro＞ were the top two best-selling albums of 2012, selling 1.17 million copies and 1.11 million copies, respectively. Moreover, (An Imitation) Blood Orange placed eighth on the best-selling albums of 2012 list. They achieved both the highest-selling album and highest-selling artist for 2012. Mr. Children became the third artist to have achieved top two spots on the year-end album ranking, also making it the first time in 14 years that any artist achieved this. Mr.Children was the 4th artist by total sales revenue in Japan in 2012, with ¥9.947 billion (approximately $84 million).

On November 19, 2014, Mr. Children released the CD single "Ashioto (Be Strong)".

On December 2, 2020, Mr. Children released their 20th studio album Soundtracks Tower Inc.

== Photographers ==
The band has collaborated with photographers such as Osami Yabuta, Reylia Slaby, Dr Christian Wong and Alfie Goodrich

== Oricon Chart statistics ==
- Artist's Total sales (CD Total Sales): 58.61 million copies sold; 2nd overall (1st - B'z)
- No. 1 on Oricon Year-End Charts: 1994 ("Innocent World"); 1996 ("Namonaki Uta"); 2007 (Home); 2012 (Mr. Children 2005–2010 <macro>)
- Double Million Seller Singles: 2nd overall (1st - Chage and Aska)
- Million-Seller Singles: 3rd overall (1st - B'z, 2nd - AKB48)
- Million-Seller Albums: 2nd overall (1st - B'z)
- The most non-tie-up Single sales: 1.82 million copies sold ("See Saw Game (Yūkan na Koi no Uta)")
- Won Japan Record Grand Prix in 1994 for "Innocent World" and in 2004 for "Sign"

== Charitable and other activities ==
Since their official debut, Mr .Children has engaged in social and charitable causes. As a group they participated in the live concert for Act Against AIDS on December 1, 1994 and again on December 1, 1995. The goal of live was to raise awareness about AIDS. The proceeds from the event were donated to support children living with HIV. The live was followed up by a collaboration Act Against AIDS charity single with fellow Japanese artist Kuwata Keisuke titled ‘Kiseki no hoshi’ and released on January 23, 1995. On April 25, 2001 Kazutoshi Sakurai also participated in the recording of Zero Landmine, a single created to promote awareness of the problem of landmines and promote a ban on landmines. In addition the group has also participated in Kazutoshi Sakura's solo project, AP Bank. AP Bank, a nonprofit lending group, carries the goal of tackling environmental problems by financing environmentally friendly projects such as renewable energy, in addition to holding yearly festivals to raise money to fund additional projects. Since its inception in 2005, Mr. Children has been actively participating in the festivals, with an announcement in 2008 that the group will now work more closely with its cause by participating during the entire three-day festival duration in addition to further details to be announced at a later time.

Members Kazutoshi Sakurai and Kenichi Tahara joined together to create Acid Test for the concert ‘Dream Power John Lennon Super live broadcasting’ on October 9, 2001. The live was part of Yoko Ono’s Dream Power and educational platform where artists came together to hold a charity concert to raise money for school construction funds for children in Africa and Asia. The John Lennon song covered by Acid Test during the live, "Mother", was later recorded and released on a tribute album Happy Birthday, John, and released on September 30, 2005.

In addition to social causes, Mr.Children's music has been used as background music for numerous television advertisements, television programs, television drama's, and motion pictures. Examples of the group's commercial tie-ins include "and I love you", "Bokura no Oto", and "Tagatame" for Nissin Cup Noodle no Border commercials, 'Gift' for the 2008 Beijing Olympics on NHK, and "Tabidachi no uta" for the 2007 Japanese movie Koizora (恋空). As a group, Mr.Children have not endorsed products by physically appearing in television commercials or printed media advertisements. One of the methods used to help promote the group is through Brajacket's, a dust jacket for books, which are available at stands in bookstores for free. The Brajacket serve as free advertising for various products from ice cream to movies and musicals. Mr. Children have used this method to promote singles and albums; for example Shifuku no Oto (シフクノオト) and I Love U (I♥U).

== Fan club ==
The official fan club of Mr. Children is called Father & Mother, the title being derived from their name. The fan club, which started in 1994, was kept relatively secretive at first, as the group has never made any mention of it on their official website. In 2006, for the release of the group's 29th single "Shirushi", the official website was revamped and with it information about the fan club was finally added. Just like before, however, the fan club can only be joined by mail and requires an admission fee of 3,500 yen, with yearly re-applications for membership.

== Band members ==
Current members

- Kazutoshi Sakurai – lead vocals, guitar, primary songwriter
- Kenichi Tahara – guitar, backing vocals

He was born in Fukuoka and is charge of playing guitar in the band. He had joined the baseball team in high school but became interested in the guitar because he saw his classmate playing a guitar at a school festival. One day one of his classmates, Kazutoshi Sakurai brought his guitar to school. They bonded with each other over it and that became the catalyst for forming Mr.Children. Known for being quiet in live concerts, his fans become estatic when he says interacts with them.

- Keisuke Nakagawa – bass guitar, backing vocals

Nakagawa was born in Nagasaki. His nickname is "Nakakei". He went to the same junior high school as Kenichi and Hideya where he started playing the bass. He is also famous for being a baseball fan.

- Hideya Suzuki – drums, backing vocals, also known as "Jen" and is the leader of Mr. Children

Supporting members

- Takeshi Kobayashi – keyboards, producer
- Naoto Inti Raymi – guitar, chorus
- Takashi "Sunny" Katsuya – keyboards, backing vocals
- Shuji Kouguchi – guitar, harmonica

== Discography ==
- Everything (1992)
- Kind of Love (1992)
- Versus (1993)
- Atomic Heart (1994)
- Shinkai (1996)
- Bolero (1997)
- Discovery (1999)
- Q (2000)
- It's a Wonderful World (2002)
- Shifuku no Oto (2004)
- I Love U (2005)
- Home (2007)
- Supermarket Fantasy (2008)
- Sense (2010)
- (An Imitation) Blood Orange (2012)
- Reflection (2015)
- Jûryoku to Kokyû (2018)
- Soundtracks (2020)
- Miss You (2023)
- Ubugoe (2026)

== Bibliography ==
- [es] Mr.Children in 370 DAYS (April 25, 1995) ISBN 4-04-852567-0 C0076
- Mr.Children Everything 天才・桜井和寿 終わりなき音の冒険 (Mr.Children Everything -Tensai Sakurai Kazutoshi owarinaki oto no bouken-) (December 25, 1996) ISBN 4-87233-308-X C0073
- Mr.Children詩集「優しい歌」 (Mr.Children song collection -Yasashii Uta-) (December 10, 2001) ISBN 4-265-80100-5 C0092

== Tours ==
- '92 Everything Tour (September 23, 1992 – November 5, 1992)

Visited 10 cities and held 10 concerts

- '92 Your Everything Tour (September 26, 1992 – November 22, 1992)

Visited 11 cities and held 12 concerts

- '92–93 Kind of Love Tour (December 7, 1992 – January 25, 1993)

Visited 9 cities and held 9 concerts

- '93 Versus Tour (September 23, 1993 – November 5, 1993)

Visited 9 cities and held 9 concerts

- Mr. Children '94 tour innocent world (September 18, 1994 – December 18, 1994)

Visited 24 cities and held 27 concerts

- Mr.Children '95 Tour Atomic Heart (January 7, 1995 – February 20, 1995)

Visited 10 cities and held 21 concerts

- -Hounen Mansaku- Natsu matsuri tour Sora [ku:] (-Hounen Mansaku- 夏祭り1995 空[ku:]) (July 16, 1995 – September 10, 1995)

Visited 11 cities and held 19 concerts

- Regress or Progress (August 24, 1996 – March 28, 1997)

Visited 14 cities and held 55 concerts

- "Discovery" Tour '99 (February 14, 1999 – July 12, 1999)

Visited 16 cities and held 42 concerts

- Mr. Children Concert tour Q (October 15, 2000 – February 24, 2001)

Visited 13 cities and held 35 concerts

- Popsaurus Mr. Children (July 15, 2001 – September 25, 2001)

Visited 10 cities and held 15 concerts

- Wonderful World on Dec. 21 (December 21, 2002)

A one night live. Originally intended to be a 26 city and 39 concert tour, but was canceled due to Kazutoshi Sakurai's hospitalization

- Tour 2004 "Shifuku no Oto" (Tour 2004 シフクノオト) (June 12, 2004 – September 25, 2004)

Stadium Tour, Visited 11 cities and held 21 concerts

- Dome tour 2005 "I ♥ U" (November 12, 2005 – December 27, 2005)

Dome Tour, Visited 5 cities and held 10 concerts

- Mr. Children & the pillows new big bang tour ~This is Hybrid Innocent~ (September 26, 2006 – October 11, 2006)

Hall tour, Visited 6 cities and held 7 concerts. The tour, a Zepp tour, was a joint effort with fellow rock group the pillows

- Mr. Children "Home" Tour 2007 (May 4, 2007 – June 23, 2007)

Arena tour, Visited 7 cities and held 14 concerts

- Mr. Children "Home" Tour 2007 -in the field- (August 4, 2007 – September 30, 2007)

Stadium tour, Visited 9 cities and held 14 concerts

- "Mr.Children Tour 2009 "Syumatsu no Confidence Songs" (Mr.Children Tour 2009 ~終末のコンフィデンスソングス~) (Feb 14, 2009 – March 31, 2009)

Arena Tour, Visited 17 cities and held 34 concerts

- Mr.Children DOME TOUR 2009 ~SUPERMARKET FANTASY~ (November 28, 2009 – December 27, 2009)

Dome tour, Visited 5 cities and held 11 concerts

- Mr.Children Tour 2011 SENSE (February 19, 2011 – May 15, 2011)

Arena Tour, Visited 9 cities and held 19 concerts

- Mr.Children STADIUM TOUR 2011 SENSE -in the field- (August 20, 2011 – September 25, 2011)

Stadium tour, Visited 6 cities and held 10 concerts

- MR.CHILDREN TOUR POPSAURUS 2012 (April 14, 2012 – June 6, 2012)

Dome tour, Visited 6 cities and held 14 concerts

- Mr.Children [(an imitation) blood orange] Tour (December 15, 2012 – June 9, 2012)

Dome tour, Visited 20 cities and held 40 concerts

- Mr.Children FATHER&MOTHER 21st anniversary Fanclub Tour (September 17, 2014 – October 9, 2014)

Zepp tour, Visited 5 cities and held 5 concerts

- Mr.Children TOUR 2015 REFLECTION (March 14, 2015 – June 4, 2015)

Arena Tour, Visited 10 cities and held 20 concerts

- Mr.Children Stadium Tour 2015 "Mikan" (Mr.Children Stadium Tour 2015 未完) (July 8, 2015 – September 20, 2015)

Stadium tour, Visited 10 cities and held 16 concerts

- Mr.Children Hall tour 2016 "Niji" (Mr.Children Hall Tour 2016 虹) (April 15, 2016 – November 21, 2016)

Hall Tour, Visited 28 cities and held 28 concerts

Note: It is the first time in 14 years to hold Hall tour since 2002

- Mr.Children Hall tour 2017 "Hikari no Atelier" (Mr.Children Hall tour 2017 "ヒカリノアトリエ") (March 4, 2017 – May 12, 2017)

Hall Tour, Visited 13 cities and held 14 concerts

- Mr.Children DOME & STADIUM TOUR 2017 Thanksgiving 25 (June 10, 2017 – September 9, 2017)

Dome and Stadium Tour, Visited 9 cities and held 15 concerts

- Mr.Children Tour 2018-19 "Juryoku to Kokyu" (Mr.Children Tour 2018-19 "重力と呼吸") (October 6, 2018 – February 2, 2019)

Arena Tour, Visited 13 cities and held 26 concerts

Note: Including the first overseas performance in Taiwan

- Mr.Children TOUR 2019 "Against All GRAVITY" (April 20, 2019 – June 2, 2019)

Dome Tour, Visited 6 cities and held 11 concerts

- Mr.Children 30th Anniversary Tour "Hanseiki eno Entrance" (Mr.Children 30th Anniversary Tour "半世紀へのエントランス") (April 23, 2022 – June 19, 2022)

Dome and Stadium Tour, Visited 6 cities and held 12 concerts

== Awards and records ==
Years	Award/Record
1994	3rd Annual Television Drama Academy Awards "Best Theme Song" – Tomorrow Never Knows; 36th Annual Japan Record Awards "Grand Prize" – Innocent World; 36th Annual Japan Record Awards "Best Album" – Atomic Heart
1995	9th Annual Japan Gold Disc Awards "Best 5 Artist Award"; 9th Annual Japan Gold Disc Awards "Grand Prix Single Award" – Tomorrow Never Knows; 9th Annual Japan Gold Disc Awards "Best 5 Single Award" – Tomorrow Never Knows; 9th Annual Japan Gold Disc Awards "Best 5 Single Award" – Innocent World; 9th Annual Japan Gold Disc Awards "Best Album" – Innocent World; 13th Annual JASRAC Awards "Silver Award" – Innocent World; 37th Annual Japan Record Awards "Excellent work prize" – See-Saw Game ~yuukan na koi no uta~
1996	10th Annual Japan Gold Disc Awards "Best 5 Single Award" – See-Saw Game ~yuukan na koi no uta~
1997	11th Annual Japan Gold Disc Awards "Best 5 Artist Award"; 11th Annual Japan Gold Disc Awards "Grand Prix Single Award" – Namonaki uta; 11th Annual Japan Gold Disc Awards "Best 5 Single Award" – Hana -memento mori-; 11th Annual Japan Gold Disc Awards "Best 5 Single Award" – Namonaki uta; 11th Annual Japan Gold Disc Awards "Best Album" – Shinkai; 13th Annual JASRAC Awards "Silver Award" – Namonaki uta; IFPI Hong Kong Gold Disc Awards "International Gold Disc" – Land in Asia; IFPI Hong Kong Gold Disc Awards "International Platinum Disc" – Bolero; IFPI Hong Kong Gold Disc Awards "International Platinum Disc" – Land in Asia; IFPI Hong Kong Gold Disc Awards "International Platinum Disc" – Shinkai
1998	12th Annual Japan Gold Disc Awards "Rock album of the year" – Bolero
1999	13th Annual Japan Gold Disc Awards "Song Of The Year" – Owarinaki Tabi; 14th Annual Japan Gold Disc Awards "Rock Album Of The Year" – DISCOVERY
2001	15th Annual Japan Gold Disc Awards "Rock Album Of The Year" – Q
2002	16th Annual Japan Gold Disc Awards "Rock Album Of The Year" – Mr.Children 1992–1995; 16th Annual Japan Gold Disc Awards "Rock Album Of The Year" – Mr.Children 1996–2000; SPACE SHOWER Music Video Awards ‘02 "Best Group Video" – youthful days; MTV Video Music Awards Japan '02 "Best Video of the Year" – Kimi ga suki; MTV Video Music Awards Japan '02 "Best Director" – Kimi ga suki; 31st Annual Television Drama Academy Awards "Best Theme Song" – youthful Days
2003	17th Annual Japan Gold Disc Awards "Rock & Pop Album of the Year" – It’s a Wonderful World; SPACE SHOWER Music Video Awards ‘03 "Best Animation Video" – HERO
2004	18th Annual Japan Gold Disc Awards "Song of the Year" – Tenohira/Kurumi; SPACE SHOWER Music Video Awards ‘04 "Best Video Of The Year" – Kurumi; SPACE SHOWER Music Video Awards ‘04 "Best Group Video" – Kurumi; 41st Television Drama Academy Awards "Best Theme Song" – Sign; 46th Annual Japan Record Awards "Grand Prize" – Sign; 46th Annual Japan Record Awards "Gold Prize" – Sign
2005	19th Annual Japan Gold Disc Awards "Song of the Year" – Sign; 19th Annual Japan Gold Disc Awards "Rock & Pop Album of the Year" – Shifuku no oto; 19th Annual Japan Gold Disc Awards "Music Video of the Year" – Shifuku no oto
2006	20th Annual Japan Gold Disc Awards "Rock & Pop Album Of The Year" – I LOVE U; 20th Annual Japan Gold Disc Awards "Rock & Pop Album of the Year" – Four Dimensions; SPACE SHOWER Music Video Awards ’06 "Special award – artist which made a special contribution to the music scene in 2005"
2007	21st Annual Japan Gold Disc Awards "The Best 10 Singles" – Shirushi; 21st Annual Japan Gold Disc Awards "The Best 10 Singles" – Houkiboshi; SPACE SHOWER Music Video Awards ’07 "Best Video Of The Year" – Shirushi; SPACE SHOWER Music Video Awards ’07 "Best Group Video" – Shirushi; Mr.Children sells over 50 million albums and singles; All-male band (with over 3 members) to have the most No. 1 albums on Oricon
2008	22nd Annual Japan Gold Disc Awards "The Best 10 Singles" – Tabidachi no uta; 22nd Annual Japan Gold Disc Awards "The Best 10 Albums" – HOME
2009	SPACE SHOWER Music Video Awards "BEST ART DIRECTION VIDEO" - esora; SPACE SHOWER Music Video Awards "BEST CREATORS' CHOICE" - GIFT; MTV VMAJ "The Best Album" - SUPERMARKET FANTASY; CD shop award "Finalist Award" - SUPERMARKET FANTASY
2011	Billboard JAPAN Music Award "Album of the Year" - SENSE
2012	Billboard JAPAN Music Award "Album of the Year" - Mr.Children 2005-2010 〈macro〉
2013	27th Japan Gold Disc Award "Album of the Year" - Mr.Children 2005-2010 〈macro〉
2016	SPACE SHOWER MUSIC AWARDS "BEST NEW VISION"

== See also ==
- Japanese rock
- Japan Record Awards
- MTV Video Music Awards Japan
- List of best-selling music artists in Japan
- List of best-selling singles in Japan

== Footnotes ==
- a. Early on in the group's career, Takeshi Kobayashi collaborated with Kazutoshi Sakurai on various songs in addition to writing songs himself. For example, "Dance dance dance" on the album Atomic Heart was co-composed by him, and "Toubousha" (逃亡者) on the album Versus, was both composed and written by him. Over the years, his composing and lyrical work with the group has lessened with the last a-side track co-written by him and Kazutoshi Sakurai being "Everybody Goes (Chitsujo no Nai Gendai ni Drop Kick)" (everybody goes -秩序のない現代にドロップキック-) which was released on December 12, 1994 .
