= Kazutoshi Sakurai =

Japanese musician (born 1970)

- Born: 櫻井 和寿; March 8, 1970 (age 56); Nerima, Tokyo, Japan
- Genres: Rock, pop
- Occupations: Musician, singer-songwriter, composer, record producer
- Years active: 1987–present
- Label: Toy's Factory

Kazutoshi Sakurai (桜井 和寿, Sakurai Kazutoshi; born 櫻井 和寿, March 8, 1970, in Tokyo) is a Japanese musician. He composes and writes almost all of the songs for his band Mr. Children, in addition to writing lyrics and singing for his solo project group Bank Band. In 2006, Sakurai ranked No. 8 in HMV's "Top 30 Best Japanese Singers of All Time" and in 2007 was voted No. 4 as the "ideal father image" by Oricon. Also, in 2009, he was chosen as one of the Young Global Leaders in World Economic Forum. As an entrepreneur, he co-founded AP Bank, where he personally provided 1 million dollars of seed money to launch and fund the nonprofit lending group which finances environmentally friendly projects.

== Musical career ==
Kazutoshi Sakurai is a respected figure in the Japanese music industry. Thanks to their quality, his lyrics are often analyzed in music magazines. The topics of his lyrics include: social issues ('So Let's Get Truth'), science/technology ("Everything is made from a dream"), depression ("Surrender"), love ("Shirushi" (しるし)), and war ("1999 Nen, Natsu, Okinawa" (1999年、夏、沖縄)). He is capable of playing various instruments, including the guitar, piano and harmonica.

For most of Sakurai's musical career, he has been part of Mr. Children, but has done other work including in 1995 where he sang and produced the charity single "Kiseki no Hoshi" (奇跡の地球) with Keisuke Kuwata (from Southern All Stars) for the Act Against AIDS campaign, in addition to being a disc jockey for Music Gambo on FM802. Sakurai has two side project bands: Acid Test (a John Lennon tribute band which is no longer active) and Bank Band. Along with fellow band member Kenichi Tahara from Mr. Children, they created the short live group, Acid Test, for the concert "Dream Power John Lennon Super live broadcasting" on October 9, 2001. The live was part of Yoko Ono's "Dream Power and Educational" platform where artists came together to hold a charity concert to raise money for school construction funds for children in Africa and Asia. The John Lennon song covered by Acid Test, "Mother", was later recorded and released on the album Happy Birthday John!: A Tribute to John Lennon, which was released on September 30, 2005.

Sakurai was temporarily hospitalized on July 21, 2002, after a blockage in his cerebellum was detected. He spent 4 months recovering from the surgery, which required all his music activities, including Mr. Children's "The Wonderful World" tour to be canceled. However, he returned to the stage on December 21, 2002, for a one night live, and later released a DVD, titled Wonderful World on Dec. 21. In June 2003 Sakurai help co-found AP Bank, a non-profit bank, with a goal of tackling environmental problems. Along with music producer Takeshi Kobayashi, and world-renowned composer Ryuichi Sakamoto, the bank invests only in environmentally friendly projects such as renewable energy. Together the 3 men invested 100 million yen each. "AP" is short for both Artists Power and Alternative Power. Artists Power is a project started in 2001 by Ryuichi Sakamoto and Takuro of Glay. In addition to the bank, Sakurai also co-started AP Bank fes., a yearly festival that raises awareness about environmental issues such as recycling and global warming, with all profits from the festival going to fund more projects at AP Bank.

As a solo act, Sakurai co-wrote and sang the single "Te wo Dasuna!" (手を出すな！) with Gaku-MC on May 31, 2006, as a special unit called "Ukasuka-G", as a cheering song for the Japanese soccer team; and as Bank Band, he teamed up with Salyu to release the song 'to U' on July 19, 2006. In 2007, he was a guest vocal on Kai Yoshihiro's 10 Stories album which did a cover song of "Kurumi" (くるみ) and appeared as a secret guest at Golden Circle Vol.10 on April 8 and 9. Sakurai along with Yumi Matsutoya, Yohito Teraoka, and Yuzu performed "Dandelion", "Mamotte Agetai", "Destiny", "Natsu Iro" and "Music". From the songs performed, Sakurai co-wrote the lyrics to "Music" which was later released on July 11, 2007, but did not join in the recording of the single. With Bank Band, Sakurai announced in July 2007 he had written a new theme song for "ap bank fes. '07" titled "Yoku kita ne" (よくきたね). On September 1, 2007, Bank Band released their first iTunes only song titled "Harumatsu Ibuki" (はるまついぶき). The song was used as the theme song for the Japanese movie Midnight Eagle, with the lyrics written by Kazutoshi Sakurai. Part of the profits from the song were donated to people affected by the Niigata earthquake, with the rest of the profits going to fund more projects at AP Bank. He released his second album Soushi Souai 2 (沿志奏逢 2) with Bank Band in 2008, and in 2010, he released another album Soushi Souai 3 (沿志奏逢 3) with Bank Band.

On May 13, 2020, it was revealed that Sakurai had written the song "Smile", which would be sung by Johnny & Associates artists' special unit "Twenty★Twenty", that includes Arashi, KAT-TUN, V6, King & Prince, SixTones and others, as part of Johnny's charity activity "Smile Up Project". This is the first collaboration between Sakurai and Johnny's

== Discography ==
=== Singles ===
==== Bank Band ====
1. "To U" (2006)
2. "Harumatsu Ibuki (はるまついぶき)" (2007) (digital)

==== Sakurai Kazutoshi x Gaku MC (Ukasuka-G) ====
1. Te wo dasuna! (31 May 2006) (as themselves)
2. Demo, te wo dasuna! (でも、手を出すな！) (20 March 2013) (Ukasuka-G)

=== Albums ===
==== Bank Band ====
1. Soushi Souai (沿志奏逢) (2004)
2. Soushi Souai 2 (沿志奏逢 2) (2008)
3. Soushi Souai 3 (沿志奏逢 3) (2010)
4. Soushi Souai 4 (沿志奏逢 4) (2021)

==== Ukasuka-G ====
1. Amigo (11 June 2014)
2. Tīshatsu to watashitachi (Tシャツと私たち) (13 July 2016)
3. Don'na kotode mo okori uru (どんなことでも起こりうる) (1 December 2021)

==== ACID TEST ====
1. Happy Birthday John! 65th anniversary ~A Tribute to John Lennon~ (2005)

=== DVD ===
==== Bank Band ====
1. BGM Vol.2 ~Enshi Souai (2004)
2. ap bank fes '05 (2005)
3. ap bank fes '06 (2006)
4. ap bank fes '07 (2008)
5. ap bank fes '08 (2009)
6. ap bank fes '09 (2010)
7. ap bank fes '10 (2011)
8. ap bank fes '11 (2012)
9. ap bank fes '12 (2013)

==== Ukasuka-G ====
1. Live & Travel DVD / Blu-ray「ウカスカジーの大冒険 〜TOUR “WE ARE NOT AFRAID !!”〜」 (14 June 2020, DVD, Blu-ray)
