= Toy's Factory =

Japanese record label

Coordinates: 35°39′35″N 139°42′19″E

Toy's Factory Inc.

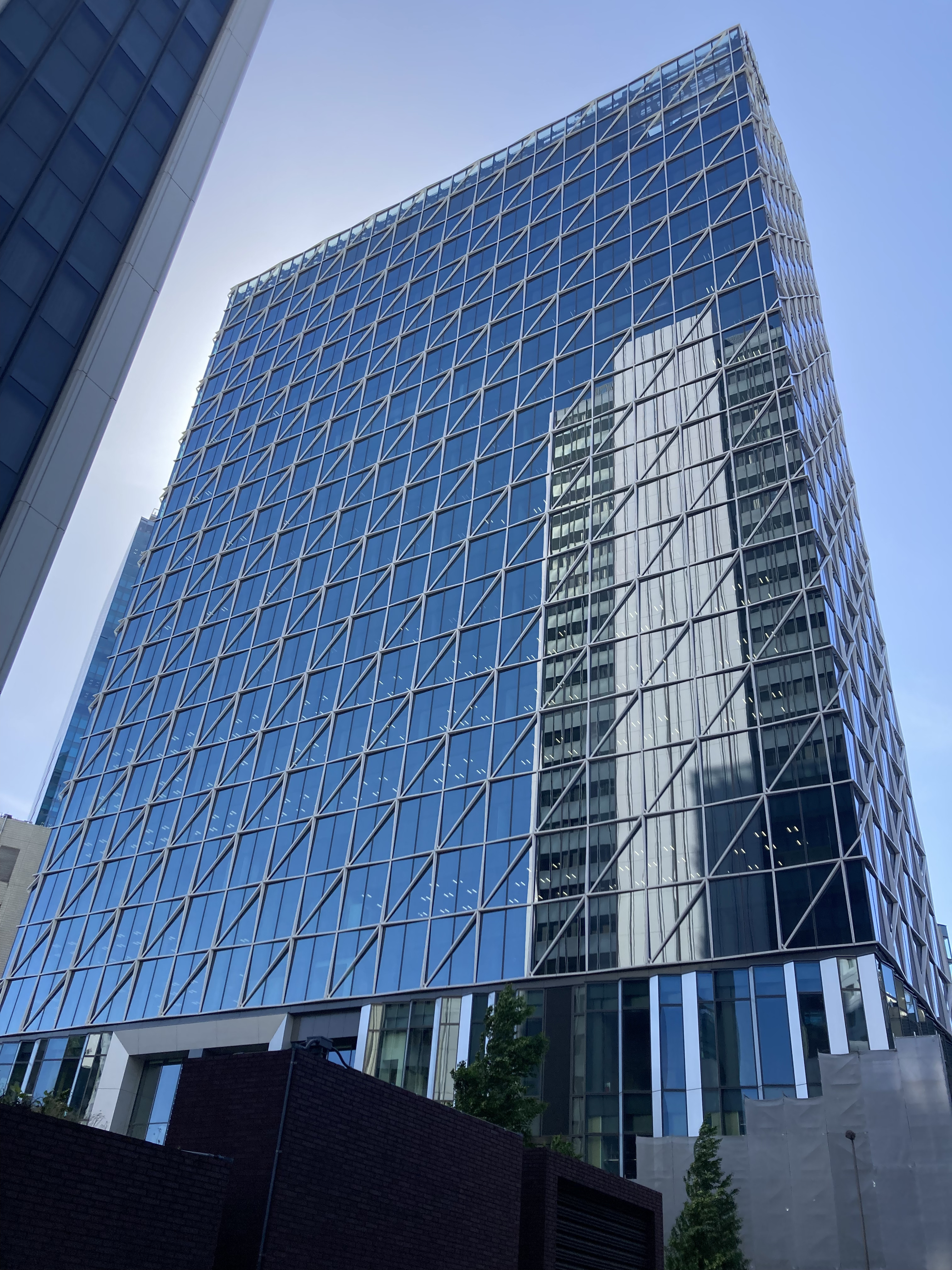
- Head office at Shibuya Axsh
- Native name: 株式会社トイズファクトリー
- Company type: Private
- Industry: Music industry
- Founded: May 30, 1990; 36 years ago
- Headquarters: Shibuya, Tokyo, Japan
- Area served: Japan
- Products: CDs, DVDs
- Subsidiaries: Senha and Company
- Website: www.toysfactory.co.jp

Toy's Factory
- Parent company: Toy's Factory
- Founded: May 30, 1990; 36 years ago
- Distributors: VAP (1990–2021); Sony Music Solutions (2021–present)
- Genre: Rock; pop; punk; metal
- Country of origin: Japan
- Location: Shibuya, Tokyo

Toy's Factory Inc. (株式会社トイズファクトリー, Kabushiki-gaisha Toizu Fakutorī) is a Japanese record label founded in the late 1980s as a subsidiary of the entertainment company VAP, based in Japan. On May 30, 1990, it was established as an independent company. It is an associate member of the Recording Industry Association of Japan. By the first half of 2012, Toy's Factory was the fourth-biggest Japanese record label.

== History ==
On May 30, 1990, the second production department at VAP, an entertainment company under Nippon Television, was spun-off and established as Toy's Factory Records. In 1995, the name was changed to its current name. VAP remained the label's distributor until April 1, 2021, when it switched to Sony Music Solutions.

== Sub-labels ==
- Bellissima!
- BMD Fox Records
- Carnage
- Deep Blue
- Idyllic
- Jūonbu Records
- Kimi
- Meme Tokyo
- Noframes Recordings
- VIA

== Notable artists ==
- ano
- Armageddon
- Babymetal – on Jūonbu Records and then BMD Fox Records
- Brahman – on Noframes
- Bump of Chicken
- Daoko
- Dempagumi.inc
- Ego-Wrappin'
- Eve
- Livetune
- Melody
- Meme Tokyo
- Midnight Grand Orchestra
- Mr. Children
- REOL
- Riria
- Salyu
- Sekai no Owari
- Shōnan no Kaze
- Speed
- Taichi Mukai
- Taku Inoue
- Toshiki Masuda
- Unison Square Garden
- Yuzu
