= Dreams Come True discography =

Recordings by Japanese pop band

- Studio albums: 20
- Soundtrack albums: 1
- Compilation albums: 6
- Video albums: 17
- Remix albums: 2
- Music box albums: 6

The discography of Japanese pop duo Dreams Come True consists of 20 studio albums, 6 compilation albums, 17 video albums, and numerous singles. The band was formed in 1988 by Miwa Yoshida, Masato Nakamura, and Takahiro Nishikawa as Cha-Cha & Audrey's Project, which was later changed to Dreams Come True. The first single "Anata ni Aitakute" did not chart, but their eponymous debut album sold over a million copies in Japan and was certified Million by the Recording Industry Association of Japan (RIAJ). The follow-up albums also performed well on the charts, with the 1989 release Love Goes On... lingering on the Oricon Albums Chart for four years. The group's fifth studio album The Swinging Star (1992) was at one point, the best-selling album in Japan, shifting over 3.7 million copies in the country. (Note: Oricon reports the sales of the album to be 3.2 million copies.)

In 1993, the band debuted the single "Winter Song", recorded in English, which was used as a theme song of the Japanese release of the film Sleepless in Seattle (1993). The single "Love Love Love" (1995) topped the Oricon Singles Chart and sold over two-million copies, being certified two-times million by the RIAJ. In the late 1990s, the band recorded English version of a few of their songs, which were included in the international edition of Sing or Die (1998). However, the album did not chart in the United States. The band's 2001 release Monkey Girl Odyssey topped the chart in Japan, but the sales had dropped. In 2002, Takahiro quit the band and Toshiba EMI dropped the group. The single "It's All About Love" (2002) was released through the band's own label, DCT Records, before being picked up by Universal J. Following another English release, the band released Diamond 15 (2004), which peaked at number 2 on the Oricon Albums Chart. The 2008 single "Tsuretette Tsuretette" topped the Oricon Singles Chart, and the parent album Do You Dreams Come True? (2009) was certified three-times platinum by the RIAJ. The band has sold about 50 million records worldwide.

== Albums ==
=== Japanese studio albums ===
Title	Album details	Peak chart positions		Sales (JPN)	Certifications
Title	Album details	JPN	TWN East Asian (Note: The G-Music chart was established in July 2005 and only archives the top 20 releases.) (Note: Positions taken from 2006 week 11 for The Love Rocks, 2007 week 51 for And I Love You, 2009 week 14 for Do You Dreams Come True?, and 2014 week 34 for Attack 25.)	Sales (JPN)	Certifications
Dreams Come True	Released: March 21, 1989 (328H-5071); Label: Epic/Sony Records; Format(s): CD, cassette	27	—	552,000	JPN: Million
Love Goes On...	Released: November 22, 1989 (ESCB-1018); Label: Epic/Sony Records; Format(s): CD	8	—	1,508,000	JPN: 2× Million
Wonder 3	Released: November 1, 1990 (ESCB-1104); Label: Epic/Sony Records; Format(s): CD, cassette	1	—	1,389,000	JPN: 4× Platinum
Million Kisses	Released: November 15, 1991 (ESCB-1250); Label: Epic/Sony Records; Format(s): CD, cassette	1	—	2,361,000	JPN: 2× Million
The Swinging Star	Released: November 14, 1992 (ESCB-1350); Label: Epic/Sony Records; Format(s): CD, cassette	1	—	3,223,000	JPN: 3× Million
Magic	Released: December 4, 1993 (ESCB-1450); Label: Epic/Sony Records; Format(s): CD, cassette	1	—	2,578,000	JPN: 2× Million
Delicious	Released: March 25, 1995 (ESCB-1550); Label: Epic/Sony Records; Format(s): CD, cassette, MiniDisc	1	—	2,966,000	JPN: 2× Million
Love Unlimited∞	Released: April 21, 1996 (ESZB-1); Label: Epic/Sony Records; Format(s): CD, cassette, MiniDisc	1	—	2,434,000 (Note: According to Billboard, Love Unlimited∞ has sold 3,000 copies in Malaysia.)	JPN: 2× Million
Sing or Die	Released: November 15, 1997 (TOCT-55002); Label: Toshiba EMI; Format(s): CD	1	—	882,000	JPN: 3× Platinum
The Monster	Released: April 21, 1999 (TOCT-56002); Label: Toshiba EMI; Format(s): CD	1	—	1,086,000	JPN: 3× Platinum
Monkey Girl Odyssey	Released: December 5, 2001 (TOCT-56006); Label: Toshiba EMI; Format(s): CD	1	—	373,000	JPN: Platinum
Diamond 15	Released: December 6, 2004 (UPCH-9215); Label: DCT Records, Universal Music; Format(s): CD	2	—	523,000	JPN: 2× Platinum
The Love Rocks	Released: February 22, 2006 (UPCH-1473); Label: DCT Records, Universal J; Format(s): CD, CD+DVD	1	8	469,000	JPN: 2× Platinum
And I Love You	Released: December 12, 2007 (UPCH-20063); Label: DCT Records, Nayutawave Records; Format(s): CD, CD+DVD	1	2	786,000	JPN: 3× Platinum
Do You Dreams Come True?	Released: March 21, 2009 (UPCH-29026/7); Label: DCT Records, Nayutawave Records; Format(s): CD, CD+DVD	1	6	672,000	JPN: 3× Platinum
Love Central	Released: November 30, 2010 (UPCH-29061); Label: DCT Records, Nayutawave Records; Format(s): CD, digital download	2	—	157,000	JPN: Platinum
Attack 25	Released: August 13, 2014 (UMCK-1525); Label: DCT Records, Universal Sigma; Format(s): CD, CD+DVD, digital download	1	25	177,000	JPN: Gold
The Dream Quest	Released: October 10, 2017 (UMCK-1818); Label: DCT Records, Universal Sigma; Format(s): CD	1	—	113,000	JPN: Gold
The Black Album	Released: March 18, 2026; Label: DCT Records, Universal Sigma; Format(s): CD	3	—	48,340	
"—" denotes items which were released before the creation of the G-Music chart, or items that failed to chart.

=== English studio albums ===
Title	Album details	Peak chart positions	Sales (JPN)	Certifications
Title	Album details	JPN	Sales (JPN)	Certifications
Sing or Die: Worldwide Version	Released: July 16, 1998 (VJCP-55004); Label: Virgin Records; Format(s): CD	4	167,000	JPN: Gold
The Monster: Universal Mix	Released: May 9, 2001 (VJCP-68300); Label: Virgin Records; Format(s): CD	7	79,000	JPN: Gold
Love Overflows: Asian Edition	Released: March 3, 2004 (UPCH-9138); Label: DCT Records, Universal Japan; Format(s): CD, CD+DVD	4	150,000	JPN: Gold

=== Compilation albums ===
Title	Album details	Peak chart positions		Sales (JPN)	Certifications
Title	Album details	JPN	TWN East Asian	Sales (JPN)	Certifications
Best of Dreams Come True	Released: October 10, 1997 (ESCB-1850); Label: Epic/Sony Records; Format(s): CD	2	—	2,177,000	JPN: 2× Million
Greatest Hits "The Soul"	Released: February 14, 2000 (ESCB-2075/6); Label: Epic Records; Format(s): CD, MiniDisc	1	—	2,362,000	JPN: 3× Million
Dreamage	Released: December 17, 2003 (ESCL 2500–2501); Label: Epic Records; Format(s): CD	6	—	409,000	JPN: 2× Platinum
Dreamania	Released: January 1, 2004 (TOCT-56010-11); Label: Toshiba EMI; Format(s): CD	6	—	173,000	JPN: Platinum
Greatest Hits "The Soul II" (Note: Coupled with Do You Dreams Come True?)	Released: March 21, 2009 (UPCH-29026/7); Label: DCT Records, Nayutawave Records; Format(s): CD	1	—		
The Soul for the People	Released: June 29, 2011 (UPCH-20252); Label: DCT Records, Nayutawave Records; Format(s): CD	4	—	96,000	JPN: Gold
Dreams Come True The Best! Watashi no Dorikamu (DREAMS COME TRUE THE BEST! 私のドリカム)	Released: July 7, 2015 (UMCK-1577/9); Label: Universal Music; Format(s): CD	1	12	901,000	JPN: Million
Dreams Come True The Ura Best! Watashi Dake no Dorikamu (DREAMS COME TRUE THE ウラBEST! 私だけのドリカム)	Released: July 7, 2016 (UMCK-1677); Label: Universal Music; Format(s): CD	1	—	180,000	JPN: Platinum
"—" denotes items which were released before the creation of the G-Music chart, or items that failed to chart.

=== Remix albums ===
Title	Album details	Peak chart positions	Sales (JPN)
Title	Album details	JPN	Sales (JPN)
Dream Catcher: Dreams Come True Mix CD	Released: September 29, 2010 (DCTR-1095); Label: DCT Records; Format(s): CD	20	—
Dream Catcher 2: Dreams Come True Mix CD	Released: July 6, 2011 (POCS-21029); Label: DCT Records; Format(s): CD	67	—

=== Limited edition albums ===
Title	Album details	Peak positions	Sales (JPN)
Title	Album details	JPN	Sales (JPN)
Sing or Die 2002: Monkey Girl Odyssey Tour Special Edition	Released: March 29, 2002 (TOCT-56007); Label: Toshiba EMI; Format(s): CD	79	5,000
The Monster 2002: Monkey Girl Odyssey Tour Special Edition	Released: March 29, 2002 (TOCT-56008); Label: Toshiba EMI; Format(s): CD	75	5,000

=== Music box albums ===
Title	Album details	Peak chart positions	Sales (JPN)
Title	Album details	JPN	Sales (JPN)
Dreams Come True Music Box Vol. 1: Winter Fantasia	Released: November 12, 2008 (DCTR-1082); Label: DCT Records; Format(s): CD	49	
Dreams Come True Music Box Vol. 2: Spring Rain	Released: February 25, 2009 (DCTR-1091); Label: DCT Records; Format(s): CD	81	
Dreams Come True Music Box Vol. 3: Early Summer	Released: March 21, 2009 (DCTR-1092); Label: DCT Records; Format(s): CD	82	
Dreams Come True Music Box Vol. 4: Summer Breeze	Released: July 8, 2009 (POCS-21013); Label: DCT Records; Format(s): CD	147	
Dreams Come True Music Box Vol. 5: Autumn Leaves	Released: October 1, 2009 (POCS-21014); Label: DCT Records; Format(s): CD	—	
Dreams Come True Music Box Vol. 6: Marry Me?	Released: May 26, 2010 (POCS-21020); Label: DCT Records; Format(s): CD	—	
"—" denotes items that did not chart.

=== Soundtrack albums ===
Title	Album details	Peak chart positions	Sales (JPN)	Certifications
Title	Album details	JPN	Sales (JPN)	Certifications
Shichi-gatsu Nanoka, Hare Soundtrack (7月7日、晴れ サウンドトラック; "July 7, Sunny Day")	Released: April 1, 1996 (ESCB 1725); Label: Epic/Sony Records; Format(s): CD	4	760,000	JPN: 3× Platinum

== Singles ==
=== As lead artist ===
List of singles, with selected chart positions
Title	Year	Peak chart positions		Sales (JPN)	Certifications	Album
Title	Year	JPN Oricon	JPN Hot 100 (Note: The Japan Hot 100 was established in February 2008.) (Note: Sources for chart positions are as follows: "Winter Song", "Nando Demo", "Mata ne", "Merry-Life-Goes-Round", "Tsuretette Tsuretette", "Good Bye My School Days", "Sono Saki e", "Nee", "Ikite Yuku no Desu", "Lies, Lies.", "My Time to Shine", "Aishite Waratte Ureshikute Namida Shite", "Made of Gold", "Saa Kane o Narase", "Kono Machi de", and "Again", "Osaka Lover", "Go for It!", "Sayonara to Baton")	Sales (JPN)	Certifications	Album
"Anata ni Aitakute" (あなたに会いたくて; "I Miss You")	1989	—	—			Dreams Come True
"Approach"	1989	—	—			Dreams Come True
"Ureshi Hazukashi Asagaeri" (うれしはずかし朝帰り; "Happy Embarrassing Staying Out All Night")	1989	49	— (Note: Charted at number 38 on the Radio Songs Chart in 2016.)	14,000		Love Goes On...
"Lat.43°N (Forty-Three Degrees North Latitude)"	1989	74	—	4,000		Love Goes On...
"Egao no Yukue" (笑顔の行方; "The Direction of My Smiling Face")	1990	2	—	446,000	RIAJ: Gold	Wonder 3
"Ring! Ring! Ring"	1990	7	—	124,000		Wonder 3
"Sayonara o Matteru" (さよならを待ってる; "Waiting for a Goodbye")	1990	4	—	142,000		Wonder 3
"Yuki no Christmas" (雪のクリスマス; "Snow Christmas")	1990	5	—	322,000	RIAJ (physical): Platinum	—N/a
"Eyes to Me"	1991	1	—	741,000	RIAJ: Platinum	Million Kisses
"Wasurenai de" (忘れないで; "Don't Forget")	1991	5	—	314,000	RIAJ: Gold	Million Kisses
"Kessen wa Kinyōbi"	1992	1	—	1,070,000	RIAJ (physical): Million; RIAJ (streaming): Gold	The Swinging Star
"Haretara Ii ne" (晴れたらいいね; "It Would Be Good If It Were Sunny")	1992	1	—	685,000	RIAJ: Platinum	The Swinging Star
"Go for It!"	1993	1	90 (Note: Charted in 2016.)	1,052,000	RIAJ (physical): Million	Magic
"Winter Song"	1994	1	53 (Note: Charted in 2009. The Snowflakes version charted at number 67 on the Adult Contemporary Airplay Chart in 2013.)	989,000	RIAJ (physical): Million; RIAJ (cellphone, Snowflakes version): Gold	Greatest Hits "The Soul"
"Wherever You Are"	1994	1	—	548,000	RIAJ (physical): Platinum	—N/a
"Suki"	1994	1	—	591,000	RIAJ (physical): Platinum	Delicious
"Thank You" (サンキュ, Sankyu)	1995	2	—	1,069,000	RIAJ (physical): 3× Platinum	Delicious
"Love Love Love"	1995	1	— (Note: Charted at number 49 on the Adult Contemporary Airplay Chart in 2010.)	2,489,000	RIAJ (physical): 2× Million; RIAJ (download): Gold; RIAJ (streaming): Gold	Love Unlimited∞
"Romance"	1995	1	—	605,000	RIAJ (physical): 2× Platinum	Love Unlimited∞
"Sō Dayo" (そうだよ; "That's Right")	1996	4	—	355,000		Sing or Die
"Yūwaku" (誘惑; "Lure")	1996	4	—	355,000		Sing or Die
"Peace!"	1997	8	—	132,000	RIAJ (physical): Platinum	Sing or Die
"Marry Me?"	1997	8	—	132,000		Sing or Die
"Ahaha" (あはは)	1998	19	—	60,000		Sing or Die
"Winter Song" (re-issue)	1998	25	—	78,000		—N/a
"Asa ga Mata Kuru" (朝がまた来る; "Tomorrow Still Comes")	1999	1	— (Note: Charted at number 49 on the Adult Contemporary Airplay Chart in 2009.)	710,000	RIAJ (physical): 3× Platinum	The Monster
"Nante Koi Shita n' Darō" (なんて恋したんだろ; "I Think I Was in Some Kind of Love")	1999	6	—	86,000		The Monster
"Snow Dance"	1999	3	— (Note: Charted at number 66 on the Adult Contemporary Airplay Chart in 2013.)	301,000	RIAJ (physical): Gold	Monkey Girl Odyssey
"Wasuremono Banchō" (わすれものばんちょう; "Lost-and-Found Leader")	2000	14	—	69,000		—N/a
"24/7"	2000	4	—	169,000	RIAJ (physical): Gold	Monkey Girl Odyssey
"Suki Dake ja Dame Nanda" (好きだけじゃだめなんだ; "Just Loving Is Bad")	2001	5	—	131,000	RIAJ (physical): Gold	Monkey Girl Odyssey
"Go On, Baby!" (Universal Mix)	2001	25	—	19,000		The Monster: Universal Mix
"Itsu no Ma ni" (いつのまに; "Before I Notice")	2001	8	—	97,000	RIAJ (physical): Gold	Monkey Girl Odyssey
"It's All About Love"	2002	6	—	32,000		Love Overflows: Asian Edition
"Yasashii Kiss o Shite" (やさしいキスをして; "Kind Kisses")	2004	2	—	316,000	RIAJ (physical): Platinum; RIAJ (cellphone): Gold; RIAJ (download): 2× Platinum; RIAJ (streaming): Platinum	Diamond 15
"Mascara Matsuge" (マスカラまつげ; "Mascara Eyebrows")	2004	5	—	47,000	RIAJ (physical): Gold	Diamond 15
"Hajimari no La" (はじまりのla; "The First La")	2004	5	—	47,000		Diamond 15
"Olá! Vitória!"	2004	10	—	42,000		Diamond 15
"Love Letter" (ラヴレター, Raburetā)	2004	5	—	50,000		Diamond 15
"Nando Demo" (何度でも; "Every Time")	2005	3	12	195,000	RIAJ (physical): Platinum; RIAJ (ringtone): 2× Platinum; RIAJ (download): 3× Platinum; RIAJ (streaming): Platinum	The Love Rocks
"Jet!!!"	2005	6	—	83,000	RIAJ (physical): Gold	The Love Rocks
"Sunshine"	2005	6	—	83,000		The Love Rocks
"Moshi mo Yuki Nara" (もしも雪なら; "If It Were Snowing")	2006	7	—	79,000	RIAJ (physical): Gold	And I Love You
"Kyō Dake wa" (今日だけは; "Only Today")	2006	7	—	79,000		And I Love You
"Osaka Lover" (大阪LOVER, Ōsaka Rabā)	2007	7	63	112,000	RIAJ (physical): Gold; RIAJ (cellphone): Platinum; RIAJ: 2× Platinum (streaming)	And I Love You
"Kimi ni Shika Kikoenai" (きみにしか聞こえない; "I Can Only Hear You")	2007	4	—	73,000	RIAJ (physical): Gold; RIAJ (cellphone): Gold	And I Love You
"Aishiteru no Sign (Watashitachi no Mirai Yosōzu)" (ア・イ・シ・テ・ルのサイン 〜わたしたちの未来予想図〜; "A Sign of Love (Our Painting of the Future)")	2007	2	— (Note: Charted at number 58 on the Adult Contemporary Airplay Chart in 2008.)	183,000	RIAJ (physical): Gold; RIAJ (cellphone): 2× Platinum; RIAJ (ringtone): Million	And I Love You
"Mata ne" (またね; "See You Later") (featuring Luffy, Zoro, Nami, Usopp, Sanji, Chopper, Robin, Franky, Hiruluk, Kureha)	2008	8	12	46,000	RIAJ (download): Gold	And I Love You
"Merry-Life-Goes-Round"	2008	6	6	31,000		Do You Dreams Come True?
"True, Baby True."	2008	6	—	31,000		Do You Dreams Come True?
"Tsuretette Tsuretette" (連れてって 連れてって; "Taking Along, Taking Along")	2008	1	1	86,000	RIAJ (physical): Gold; RIAJ (cellphone): Gold	Do You Dreams Come True?
"Good Bye My School Days"	2009	6	4	28,000		Do You Dreams Come True?
"Sono Saki e" (その先へ; "Forward") (featuring Fuzzy Control)	2009	3	1	74,000	RIAJ (download): Platinum	Love Central
"Nee" (ねぇ; "Hey")	2010	5	4	51,000	RIAJ (physical): Gold; RIAJ (cellphone): Gold	Love Central
"Ikite Yuku no Desu" (生きてゆくのです; "I'm Keeping On Living")	2010	5	3	44,000	RIAJ (physical): Gold	Love Central
"Lies, Lies."	2010	4	5	19,000		Love Central
"My Time to Shine"	2012	5	7	41,000		Attack 25
"Saa Kane o Narase" (さぁ鐘を鳴らせ; "Hey, Ring the Bell")	2013	6	2	30,000	RIAJ (download): Gold	Attack 25
"Made of Gold" (featuring Dabada)	2013	6	3	30,000		Attack 25
"Aishite Waratte Ureshikute Namida Shite" (愛して笑ってうれしくて涙して; "Loving, Laughing, Happily Crying") (Note: The single was released digitally.)	2013	—	29			Attack 25
"Kono Machi de" (この街で; "In this Town") (Note: The single received only a limited release through Aeon retail.)	2013	—	4			Attack 25
"Again"	2014	10	3	19,000		Attack 25
"Sayonara to Baton" (サヨナラとバトン)	2026	—	78			Non-album single
"—" denotes items which were released before the creation of the Billboard Japan Hot 100, or items that did not chart.

=== As collaborating artists ===
List of singles, with selected chart positions
Title	Year	Peak chart positions	Sales (JPN)	Certifications	Album
Title	Year	JPN Oricon	Sales (JPN)	Certifications	Album
"I Miss You (Toki o Koete)" (Misia featuring DCT)	2001	3	432,000	JPN (physical): Platinum	Marvelous

=== Promotional singles ===
List of promotional singles, with selected chart positions
Title	Year	Peak chart positions		Album
Title	Year	JPN Hot 100 (Note: Sources for chart positions are as follows: "Godspeed!", "Itoshi no Riley", and "Anata no Yō ni".)	RIAJ Digital Track Chart (Note: The RIAJ Digital Track Chart is a deprecated chart that ran from 2009 until early 2012 and tracked full-length cellphone downloads.) (Note: Sources for chart positions are as follows: "Mirai Yosozu II", "Godspeed!", "Ai ga Tadoritsuku Basho", and "Jikan Ryokō".)	Album
"Godspeed!"	2010	18	27	Love Central
"Kyūshū o Doko Made mo" (九州をどこまでも)	2015	—	—	The Dream Quest
"Itoshi no Riley" (愛しのライリー)	2015	66	—	The Dream Quest
"Anata no Yō ni" (あなたのように)	2016	6	—	The Dream Quest
"KnockKnock!"	2017	-	—	The Dream Quest
"Anata to Onaji Soranoshita" (あなたと同じ空の下)	2017	-	—	The Dream Quest
"Sonohi ha Kanarazu Kuru" (その日は必ず来る)	2017	-	—	The Dream Quest

=== Other charted songs ===
List of songs not released as singles or promotional singles, with selected chart positions and certifications
Title	Year	Peak chart positions			Certifications	Album
Title	Year	JPN Hot 100 (Note: Sources for chart positions are as follows: "Ai ga Tadoritsuku Basho", "Sōzō o Koeru Ashita e", "7 Gatsu 7 Ka, Hare", and "One Last Dance, Still in Trance", "Ureshii! Tanoshii! Daisuki!", and "Mirai Yosozu II (Version '07)".)	RIAJ monthly ringtones (Note: The RIAJ "Reco-kyō" monthly ringtone chart is a deprecated chart that ran from 2006 until 2009.) (Note: Sources for chart positions are as follows: "Mirai Yosozu II", "Mirai Yosozu II (English Version)", "Mirai Yosozu II (Version '07)".)	RIAJ Digital Track Chart	Certifications	Album
"Mirai Yosozu II" (未来予想図II; "Painting of the Future II")	1989	— (Note: Charted at number 95 on the Adult Contemporary Airplay Chart in 2012.)	80	34	RIAJ (download): Platinum; RIAJ (cellphone): Gold; RIAJ (streaming): Platinum	Love Goes On...
"Shichi-gatsu Nanoka, Hare" (7月7日、晴れ; "July 7, Sunny Day")	1996	28	—	—		Shichi-gatsu Nanoka, Hare Soundtrack
"Mirai Yosozu II (English Version)" (未来予想図II ～ENGLISH VERSION～; "Painting of the Future")	2007	—	78	—		—N/a
"Mirai Yosozu II (Version '07) (未来予想図II 〜VERSION '07〜; "Painting of the Future")	2012	97 (Note: Charted in 2015.)	69	—	RIAJ (cellphone): Gold	"Aishiteru no Sign (Watashitachi no Mirai Yosōzu)" (single)
"Sōzō o Koeru Ashita e" (想像を超える明日へ; "To a Tomorrow Beyond Imagination")	2012	56	—	—		"My Time to Shine" (single)
"Ai ga Tadoritsuku Basho" (愛がたどりつく場所; "The Place Where Love Clambers To")	2012	5	—	10	RIAJ (download): Gold	"My Time to Shine" (single)
"Jikan Ryokō" (時間旅行; "Time Travel")	2012	20	—	8		Wonder 3 / "My Time to Shine" (single)
"Happy Happy Birthday"	2012	—	—	—	RIAJ (download): Gold	"Again" (single)
"One Last Dance, Still in Trance"	2014	29	—	—		Attack 25
"Ureshii! Tanoshii! Daisuki!" (うれしい!たのしい!大好き!)	2015	75 (Note: Originally released as the b-side to "Ureshi Hazukashi Asagaeri" (1989).)	—	—		Love Goes On...
"—" denotes items which were released before the creation of the Billboard Japan Hot 100, or the RIAJ Charts, or items that did not chart.

== Other appearances ==
Song	Year	Album
"Eternity"	1994	The Swan Princess: Soundtrack
"Crystal Vine"	2001	Atlantis: The Lost Empire
"Sweet Sweet Sweet"	2011	Sonic the Hedgehog 1&2 Soundtrack
"Sweet Sweet Sweet" (06 Akon Mix)	2011	Sonic the Hedgehog 1&2 Soundtrack
"Sweet Dream" (06 Akon Mix)	2011	Sonic the Hedgehog 1&2 Soundtrack

== Videography ==
=== Video albums ===
List of media, with selected chart positions
Title	Album details	Peak chart positions		Certifications
Title	Album details	JPN DVD	JPN Blu-ray	Certifications
Shijō Saikyō no Idō Yuenchi Dreams Come True Wonderland '91 (史上最強の移動遊園地 ドリカムワンダーランド '91; The Fastest Amusement Park Ride Ever Dreams Come True Wonderland '91)	Released: February 21, 1991 (ESVU 350); Label: Epic Records; Format(s): VHS, LD, Betamax, DVD	—	—	
Shijō Saikyō no Idō Yuenchi Dreams Come True Wonderland '91:50 Manri no Dream Catcher (史上最強の移動遊園地 ドリカムワンダーランド '95★50万人のドリームキャッチャー; "The Fastest Amusement Park Ride Ever Dreams Come True Wonderland '91: Dream Catcher of 500,000")	Released: December 1, 1995 (ESVU 450); Label: Epic Records; Format(s): VHS, LD, DVD	219 (Note: Charted in 2003)	—	
Children of the Sun: Live! D.C.T. 1998 Sing or Die	Released: July 16, 1997 (TOBF-55011); Label: Toshiba EMI; Format(s): VHS, LD, DVD	—	—	
Shijō Saikyō no Idō Yuenchi Dreams Come True Wonderland 1999: Natsu no Yume (史上最強の移動遊園地 DREAMS COME TRUE WONDERLAND 1999 〜夏の夢〜; "The Fastest Amusement Park Ride Ever Dreams Come True Wonderland 1999: Summer Dream")	Released: March 14, 2000 (TOBF-55012); Label: Toshiba EMI; Format(s): VHS, DVD	23	—	
Shijō Saikyō no Idō Yuenchi Dreams Come True Wonderland 1999: Fuyu no Yume (史上最強の移動遊園地 DREAMS COME TRUE WONDERLAND 1999 〜冬の夢〜; "The Fastest Amusement Park Ride Ever Dreams Come True Wonderland 1999: Winter Dream")	Released: March 14, 2000 (TOBF-55013); Label: Toshiba EMI; Format(s): VHS, DVD	21	—	
DCT Clips V1	Released: December 5, 2001 (TOVF-55019); Label: Toshiba EMI; Format(s): VHS, DVD	7	—	
Shijō Saikyō no Idō Yuenchi Dreams Come True Wonderland 2003 (史上最強の移動遊園地 DREAMS COME TRUE WONDERLAND 2003; "The Fastest Amusement Park Ride Ever Dreams Come True Wonderland 2003")	Released: December 17, 2003 (UPBH-1121); Label: DCT Records, Universal J; Format(s): DVD	7	—	
DCT TV Special Dreams Come True Wonderland 2003 Documentary (DCT-TV スペシャル DREAMS COME TRUE WONDERLAND 2003 DOCUMENTARY)	Released: February 23, 2005 (UPBH-1160); Label: Universal J, DCT Records; Format(s): DVD	47	—	
Dreams Come True Concert Tour 2005 Diamond 15	Released: July 27, 2005 (UPBH-1168); Label: DCT Records, Universal J; Format(s): DVD	4	—	
Dreams Come True Concert Tour 2006: The Love Rocks	Released: November 29, 2006 (UPBH-1198); Label: DCT Records, Universal J; Format(s): DVD	2	—	
Shijō Saikyō no Idō Yuenchi Dreams Come True Wonderland 2007 (史上最強の移動遊園地 DREAMS COME TRUE WONDERLAND 2007; "The Fastest Amusement Park Ride Ever Dreams Come True Wonderland 2007")	Released: February 27, 2008 (UPBH-20014/5); Label: DCT Records, Universal J; Format(s): DVD, Blu-ray	1	—	JPN: Gold
20th Anniversary Dreams Come True Concert Tour 2009 "Dorishitemasu?" (20th Anniversary DREAMS COME TRUE CONCERT TOUR 2009 "ドリしてます?"; "20th Anniversary Dreams Come True Concert Tour 2009 'Have Taken?'")	Released: October 1, 2009 (UPBH-20040/1); Label: Nayutawave Records; Format(s): DVD, Blu-ray	6	—	
Minna de Dorisuru? Do You Dreams Come True? Special Live (みんなでドリする? DO YOU DREAMS COME TRUE? SPECIAL LIVE!)	Released: December 21, 2009 (UPBH-20042); Label: Universal Music; Format(s): DVD	19	—	
The Live!!! 2010: Dori×Pokari to Nama Rabusen (THE LIVE!!! 2010 〜ドリ×ポカリと生ラブセン〜)	Released: June 29, 2011 (UPBH-20067/9); Label: Nayutawave Records; Format(s): DVD, Blu-ray	6	4	
Shijō Saikyō no Idō Yuenchi Dreams Come True Wonderland 2011 (史上最強の移動遊園地 DREAMS COME TRUE WONDERLAND 2011; "The Fastest Amusement Park Ride Ever Dreams Come True Wonderland 2011")	Released: March 21, 2012 (UMBK-1171/2); Label: DCT Records, Universal J; Format(s): DVD, Blu-ray	4	4	
Dreams Come True Ura Dori Wonderland 2012/2013 (DREAMS COME TRUE 裏ドリワンダーランド 2012/2013)	Released: June 19, 2013 (UMBK-1200/1); Label: DCT Records, Universal J; Format(s): DVD, Blu-ray	2	13	
25th Anniversary Dreams Come True Concert Tour 2014 Attack 25 (25th Anniversary DREAMS COME TRUE CONCERT TOUR 2014 ATTACK 25)	Released: July 7, 2015 (UMBK-9292); Label: DCT Records, Universal J; Format(s): DVD, Blu-ray	-	-	
Shijō Saikyō no Idō Yuenchi Dreams Come True Wonderland 2015 (史上最強の移動遊園地 DREAMS COME TRUE WONDERLAND 2015)	Released: July 7, 2016 (UMBK-1240); Label: DCT Records, Universal J; Format(s): DVD, Blu-ray	-	-	
Dreams Come True Ura Dori Wonderland 2016 (DREAMS COME TRUE 裏ドリワンダーランド 2016)	Released: July 7, 2017 (UMBK-1215); Label: DCT Records, Universal J; Format(s): DVD, Blu-ray	-	-	
"—" denotes items which were released before the creation of the DVD and/or Blu-ray charts, or items that did not chart.

=== Music videos ===
Title	Year	Director
"Sō Dayo"	1996	Yasuyuki Yamaguchi
"Asa ga Mata Kuru"	1999	Wataru Takeishi
"Nante Koi Shita n' Darō"	1999	Wataru Takeishi
"Snow Dance"	1999	Noriyuki Tanaka
"24/7"	2000	Ichirō Miyamoto
"Suki Dake ja Dame Nanda"	2001	Ichirō Miyamoto
"Itsu no Ma ni"	2001	Ken Sueda
"Canon" (カノン)	2001	Ken Sueda
"It's All About Love"	2002	Ken Sueda
"Yasashii Kiss o Shite"	2004	Shigeaki Kubo
"Mascara Matsuge"	2004	Ken Sueda
"Hajimari no La"	2004	Satoshi Takagi
"Olá! Vitória!"	2004	Yūichi Kodama
"Love Letter"	2004	Ken Sueda
"Nando Demo"	2005	Nakano Hiroyuki
"Jet!!!"	2005	Ken Sueda
"Sunshine"	2005	Tetsuo Inoue
"Moshi mo Yuki no Nara"	2006	Miwa Yoshida, Masato Nakamura, Ken Sueda
"Kyō Dake wa"	2006	Shigeaki Kubo
"Osaka Lover"	2007	Seki Ryūji
"Kimi ni Shika Kikoenai" (movie version)	2007	Keīchi Kobayashi
"Aishiteru no Sign (Watashitachi no Mirai Yosōzu)"	2007	Shigeaki Kubo
"Merry-Life-Goes-Round"	2008	Shigeaki Kubo
"Tsuretette Tsuretette"	2008	Shigeaki Kubo
"Good Bye My School Days"	2009	Shigeaki Kubo
"Sono Saki e"	2009	Fumihiko Sori
"Nee"	2010	Shinji Niwa
"Ikite Yuku no Desu"	2010	Electronik
"Sōzō o Koeru Ashita e"	2012	Hamamura "Hama" Tomohiro
"Ai ga Tadoritsuku Basho"	2012	Hideaki Kuroda
"Made of Gold"	2013	Hamamura "Hama" Tomohiro
"Saa Kane o Narase"	2013	Hamamura "Hama" Tomohiro
"Kono Machi de"	2013	Naohiko Isomura
"Again"	2014	Hamamura "Hama" Tomohiro
