= List of best-selling albums in Japan =

Japan is the second-largest music market in the world and the following lists cover the top-selling albums in the country of Japan, based on information provided by the Recording Industry Association of Japan and Oricon Inc.

== History ==
In the history of the Oricon weekly albums chart, which started in January 1970, only 280 out of all of the charting albums have sold more than one million copies, a feat mostly achieved by domestic acts.

This is a list of the top-selling albums in Japan, based on data compiled by Oricon. Prior to January 1987, the domestic albums chart was separated into LPs (created in 1970), cassette tapes (introduced in 1974) and compact discs (launched in 1985), until their unification, which remains the current form. It is worth noting that Oricon only takes into consideration physical sales for its charts, meaning that digital purchases are excluded. The best-selling album is First Love (1999) by solo artist Hikaru Utada, which sold over 7.5 million copies by the end of that year. Ryuichi Kawamura's Love (1997) topped the album chart with sales of 1,021,000 copies, making him the only male solo artist to have an album sell over one million copies in its first week in Oricon history. Love went on to sell 2,788,000 copies, and holds the record as the best-selling male solo album of all time. Whereas, Mr. Children's Atomic Heart (1994), still remains its position as the top-selling original studio album by a male band.

Message, originally released in 2001 by Okinawan punk band Mongol800 became the first album in Oricon's history to sell more than one million copies despite being released on an independent label.

== List of albums ==
Colors
Greatest hits album

Album	Artist	Released	Sales	Certification	Certified date
First Love	Hikaru Utada	10 March 1999	8,700,000	8× Million	1999-09
B'z The Best "Pleasure"	B'z	20 May 1998	5,136,000	5× Million	1998-06
Review	Glay	1 October 1997	5,000,000	5× Million	1998-12
Distance	Hikaru Utada	28 March 2001	4,472,353	4× Million	2001-06
B'z The Best "Treasure"	B'z	20 September 1998	4,439,000	4× Million	1998-10
A Best	Ayumi Hamasaki	28 March 2001	4,293,843	4× Million	2001-04
Globe	Globe	31 March 1996	4,136,000	4× Million	1996-06
Umi no Yeah!!	Southern All Stars	25 June 1998	4,000,000	4× Million	2003-10
Deep River	Hikaru Utada	19 June 2002	3,605,000	3× Million	2002-08
Number 1's	Mariah Carey	17 November 1998	3,600,000	3× Million	1998-12
Delicious Way	Mai Kuraki	28 June 2000	3,530,000	3× Million	2000-07
Time to Destination	Every Little Thing	15 April 1998	3,520,000	3× Million	1998-05
Atomic Heart	Mr. Children	1 September 1994	3,430,000	3× Million	1995-11
Sweet 19 Blues	Namie Amuro	22 July 1996	3,359,000	3× Million	1996-08
5×20 All the Best!! 1999–2019	Arashi	26 June 2019	3,300,400	2× Million	2019-09
Bolero	Mr. Children	5 March 1997	3,283,000	3× Million	1997-04
Neue Musik	Yumi Matsutoya	6 November 1998	3,252,000	3× Million	1998-12
Faces Places	Globe	12 March 1997	3,239,000	3× Million	1997-05
The Swinging Star	Dreams Come True	14 November 1992	3,227,000	8× Platinum(old)	1993-02
Impressions	Mariya Takeuchi	25 July 1994	3,067,000	3× Million	1995-02
Zard Best: The Single Collection	Zard	28 May 1999	3,034,000	3× Million	1999-10
All Singles Best	Kobukuro	27 September 2006	3,018,000	3× Million	2007-10
Loose	B'z	22 November 1995	3,003,210	3× Million	1996-05
Duty	Ayumi Hamasaki	27 September 2000	2,985,000	3× Million	2000-09
Delicious	Dreams Come True	25 March 1995	2,966,000	2× Million	1995-04
Back Beats #1	Maki Ohguro	11 December 1995	2,868,000	2× Million	1996-02
Ballads 3 ~The Album of Love~	Southern All Stars	22 November 2000	2,845,000	2× Million	2000-11
Evergreen	My Little Lover	5 December 1995	2,797,000	2× Million	1995-12
Love	Ryuichi Kawamura	22 November 1997	2,788,000	2× Million	1997-12
Cruise Record 1995–2000	Globe	22 September 1999	2,763,000	2× Million	1999-10
Shinkai	Mr. Children	24 June 1996	2,745,000	2× Million	1996-07
Message	Mongol800	16 September 2001	2,729,000		
musiQ	Orange Range	1 December 2004	2,649,000	2× Million	2004-12
Drive: Glay Complete Best	Glay	29 November 2000	2,637,000	2× Million	2000-12
Utada Hikaru Single Collection Vol. 1	Hikaru Utada	31 March 2004	2,621,000	2× Million	2004-03
Mother Father Brother Sister	Misia	24 June 1998	2,580,000	2× Million	1998-07
Love Brace	Tomomi Kahara	3 June 1996	2,571,000	2× Million	1996-06
Loveppears	Ayumi Hamasaki	10 November 1999	2,562,000	2× Million	1999-11
The Way We Are	Chemistry	7 November 2001	2,471,000	2× Million	2001-11
Finally	Namie Amuro	8 November 2017	2,451,651	2× Million	2017-12
Love Unlimited	Dreams Come True	21 April 1996	2,434,000	2× Million	1996-04
Pure Soul	Glay	29 July 1998	2,427,000	2× Million	1998-09
Dance to Positive	TRF	27 March 1995	2,382,000	2× Million	1995-04
Heavy Gauge	Glay	20 October 1999	2,358,000	2× Million	1999-10
Shōso Strip	Ringo Sheena	31 March 2000	2,332,000	2× Million	2000-04
Mr. Children 1992–1995	Mr. Children	11 July 2001	2,324,000	2× Million	2001-08
Moment	Speed	16 December 1998	2,319,000	2× Million	1998-12
Greatest Hits "The Soul"	Dreams Come True	14 February 2000	2,318,000	2× Million	2000-02
Ark	L'Arc-en-Ciel	1 July 1999	2,315,000	2× Million	1999-07
I Am...	Ayumi Hamasaki	1 January 2002	2,308,000		
Love Is the Message	Misia	1 January 2000	2,298,000	2× Million	2000-02
Best! Morning Musume 1	Morning Musume	31 January 2001	2,260,000	2× Million	2001-02
Every Best Single +3	Every Little Thing	31 March 1999	2,256,000	2× Million	1999-04
Ray	L'Arc-en-Ciel	1 July 1999	2,179,000	2× Million	1999-07
Best of Dreams Come True	Dreams Come True	1 October 1997	2,170,000	2× Million	1997-10
The Power Source	Judy and Mary	26 March 1997	2,162,000	2× Million	1997-05
Def Tech	Def Tech	22 January 2005	2,100,000		
Ketsunopolis 4	Ketsumeishi	29 June 2005	2,071,000	2× Million	2005-06
Viva la Revolution	Dragon Ash	23 July 1999	2,060,000	2× Million	1999-08
Rise	Speed	1 April 1998	2,048,000	2× Million	1998-05
Second to None	Chemistry	1 January 2003	2,025,000	2× Million	2003-01

== List of Million-certified albums by the Recording Industry Association of Japan ==
This is the list of the albums that have shipped over 1,000,000 copies and been certified Million by the Recording Industry Association of Japan (RIAJ). Albums are listed in alphabetical order of each recording artists' name.

Year	Artist	Title	Level	Notes
1999	19	Ongaku	Million	
1996	Nanase Aikawa	red	2× Million	
1997	Nanase Aikawa	paraDOX	Million	
1999	Nanase Aikawa	ID	Million	Compilation album
2011	AKB48	Koko ni Ita Koto	Million	
2012	AKB48	1830m	Million	
2014	AKB48	Tsugi no Ashiato	Million	
2000	aiko	Sakura no Ki no Shita	Million	
2001	aiko	Natsufuku	Million	
1995	Namie Amuro	Dance Tracks Vol.1	2× Million	
1996	Namie Amuro	Sweet 19 Blues	3× Million	
1997	Namie Amuro	Concentration 20	2× Million	
1998	Namie Amuro	181920	2× Million	Compilation album
2008	Namie Amuro	Best Fiction	Million	Compilation album
2017	Namie Amuro	Finally	2× Million	Compilation album
2009	Arashi	All the Best! 1999–2009	Million	Compilation album
2010	Arashi	Boku no Miteiru Fūkei	Million	
2011	Arashi	Beautiful World	Million	
2015	Arashi	Japonism	Million	
2019	Arashi	5x20 All the Best!! 1999–2019	2x Million	Compilation album
2006	Ayaka	First Message	Million	
2009	Ayaka	Ayaka's History 2006–2009	Million	Compilation album
2002	Kimimaro Ayanokoji	Bakushou Super Live Dai-1 Shū: Chūkounen ni Ai wo Komete	Million	Live album
1989	B'z	Off the Lock	Million	
1990	B'z	Break Through	Million	
1990	B'z	Wicked Beat	Million	
1990	B'z	Risky	Million	
1991	B'z	Mars	Million	EP
1991	B'z	In the Life	3× Million	
1992	B'z	Run	2× Million	
1992	B'z	Friends	2× Million	EP
1994	B'z	The 7th Blues	Million	
1995	B'z	Loose	3× Million	
1996	B'z	Friends II	Million	EP
1997	B'z	Flash Back: B'z Early Special Titles	Million	Compilation album
1997	B'z	Survive	2× Million	
1998	B'z	B'z The Best "Pleasure"	5× Million	Compilation album
1998	B'z	B'z The Best "Treasure"	4× Million	Compilation album
1999	B'z	Brotherhood	Million	
2000	B'z	B'z The "Mixture"	2× Million	Compilation album
2000	B'z	Eleven	2× Million	
2002	B'z	Green	Million	
2002	B'z	The Ballads: Love & B'z	Million	Compilation album
2005	B'z	B'z The Best "Pleasure II"	Million	Compilation album
2008	B'z	B'z The Best "Ultra Pleasure"	Million	Compilation album
2001	Backstreet Boys	The Hits: Chapter One	Million	Compilation album
2000	The Beatles	1	2× Million	Compilation album
2002	BoA	Listen to My Heart	Million	
2003	BoA	Valenti	Million	
2005	BoA	Best of Soul	Million	Compilation album
1994	Bon Jovi	Cross Road	Million	Compilation album
1995	Bon Jovi	These Days	Million	
1998	Boøwy	This Boøwy	Million	Compilation album
1998	The Brilliant Green	The Brilliant Green	Million	
2021	BTS	BTS, the Best	Million	Compilation album
1991	Mariah Carey	Emotions	Million	
1993	Mariah Carey	Music Box	Million	
1994	Mariah Carey	Merry Christmas	2× Million	
1995	Mariah Carey	Daydream	Million	
1997	Mariah Carey	Butterfly	Million	
1998	Mariah Carey	Number 1's	3× Million	Compilation album
1995	The Carpenters	Seishun no Kagayaki: 22 Hits of the Carpenters	2× Million	Compilation album
1991	Chage and Aska	Tree	3× Million	
1992	Chage and Aska	Super Best II	2× Million	Compilation album
1992	Chage and Aska	Guys	Million	
1993	Chage and Aska	Red Hill	Million	
1997	Chara	Junior Sweet	Million	
2001	Chemistry	The Way We Are	2× Million	
2002	Chemistry	Second to None	2× Million	
1982	Eric Clapton	Timepieces: The Best of Eric Clapton	Million	Compilation album
1992	Eric Clapton	Unplugged	Million	Live album
1999	Eric Clapton	Clapton Chronicles: The Best of Eric Clapton	2× Million	Compilation album
2001	Da Pump	Da Best of Da Pump	Million	Compilation album
1994	Deen	Deen	Million	
1997	Celine Dion	Let's Talk About Love	Million	
1999	Celine Dion	All the Way… A Decade of Song	2× Million	Compilation album
2005	Def Tech	Def Tech	2× Million	
2006	Def Tech	Catch the Wave	Million	
1998	Dragon Ash	Buzz Songs	Million	
1999	Dragon Ash	Viva la Revolution	2x Million	
2001	Dragon Ash	Lily Of Da Valley	Million	
1989	Dreams Come True	Dreams Come True	Million	
1989	Dreams Come True	Love Goes On...	2× Million	
1990	Dreams Come True	Wonder 3	Million	
1991	Dreams Come True	Million Kisses	3× Million	
1992	Dreams Come True	The Swinging Star	Million	
1993	Dreams Come True	Magic	2× Million	
1995	Dreams Come True	Delicious	2× Million	
1996	Dreams Come True	Love Unlimited	Million	
1997	Dreams Come True	The Best of Dreams Come True	Million	Compilation album
1997	Dreams Come True	Sing or Die	Million	
1999	Dreams Come True	The Monster	Million	
2000	Dreams Come True	Greatest Hits "The Soul"	2× Million	Compilation album
2015	Dreams Come True	Dreams Come True The Best! Watashi no Dorikamu	Million	Compilation album
1997	Enya	Paint the Sky with Stars	Million	Compilation album
2001	Enya	Themes from Calmi Cuori Appassionati	Million	Compilation album
1997	Every Little Thing	Everlasting	Million	
1998	Every Little Thing	Time to Destination	4× Million	
1999	Every Little Thing	Every Best Single +3	2× Million	Compilation album
2000	Every Little Thing	eternity	Million	
2001	Every Little Thing	4 Force	Million	
2003	Exile	Exile Entertainment	Million	
2005	Exile	Perfect Best	Million	Compilation album
2007	Exile	Exile Love	Million	
2008	Exile	Exile Catchy Best	Million	Compilation album
2008	Exile	Exile Ballad Best	2× Million	Compilation album
2009	Exile	Aisubeki Mirai e	Million	
2011	Exile	Negai no Tō	Million	
1993	Masaharu Fukuyama	Calling	Million	
1995	Masaharu Fukuyama	M-Collection: Kaze wo Sagashiteru	Million	Compilation album
1999	Masaharu Fukuyama	Magnum Collection 1999 "Dear"	Million	Double-disc compilation album
2001	Masaharu Fukuyama	F	Million	
2011	Girls' Generation	Girls' Generation	Million	
1996	Glay	Beloved	Million	
1997	Glay	Review	5× Million	Compilation album
1998	Glay	Pure Soul	3× Million	
1999	Glay	Heavy Gauge	2× Million	
2000	Glay	Drive: Complete Best	2x Million	Double-disc compilation album
1996	Globe	Globe	4× Million	
1997	Globe	Faces Places	3× Million	
1998	Globe	Love Again	2× Million	
1998	Globe	Relation	2× Million	
1999	Globe	Cruise Record 1995-2000	2× Million	Double-disc compilation album
2001	Gospellers	Love Notes	Million	
2008	Greeeen	A, Domo. Ohisashiburi Desu.	Million	
2009	Greeeen	Shio, Koshō	Million	
1989	Shogo Hamada	Wasted Tears	Million	
2000	Shogo Hamada	The History of Shogo Hamada "Since 1975"	Million	Compilation album
1999	Ayumi Hamasaki	A Song for ××	Million	
1999	Ayumi Hamasaki	"A"	Million	14-track CD single
1999	Ayumi Hamasaki	Loveppears	2× Million	
2000	Ayumi Hamasaki	Duty	3× Million	
2001	Ayumi Hamasaki	A Best	4× Million	Compilation album
2002	Ayumi Hamasaki	I am...	3× Million	
2002	Ayumi Hamasaki	Rainbow	2× Million	
2003	Ayumi Hamasaki	A Ballads	Million	Compilation album
2003	Ayumi Hamasaki	Memorial Address	Million	EP
2004	Ayumi Hamasaki	My Story	Million	
2006	Ayumi Hamasaki	(Miss)Understood	Million	
1998	hide with Spread Beaver	Ja, Zoo	Million	
1999	Lauryn Hill	The Miseducation of Lauryn Hill	Million	
2003	HY	Street Story	Million	
1993	Kyosuke Himuro	Memories of Blue	Million	
1995	Kyosuke Himuro	Singles	Million	Compilation album
2000	Ken Hirai	The Changing Same	Million	
2001	Ken Hirai	Gaining Through Losing	Million	Compilation album
2003	Ken Hirai	Life Is...	Million	
2005	Ken Hirai	Ken Hirai 10th Anniversary Complete Single Collection '95-'05 "Uta Baka"	2× Million	Compilation album
1993	Eri Hiramatsu	Single is Best	Million	Compilation album
1998	Kohmi Hirose	The Best "Love Winters"	2× Million	Compilation album
1999	Tomoyasu Hotei	Greatest Hits 1990-1999	Million	Compilation album
2010	Ikimonogakari	Ikimonobakari: Members Best Selection	Million	Compilation album
1989	Miki Imai	Ivory	Million	Compilation album
1993	Miki Imai	Ivory II	Million	Compilation album
1997	Miki Imai	Pride	Million	
1997	Koshi Inaba	Magma	Million	
1999	Yōsui Inoue	Golden Best	Million	Double-disc compilation album
1994	Judy and Mary	Orange Sunshine	Million	
1995	Judy and Mary	Miracle Diving	Million	
1997	Judy and Mary	The Power Source	Million	2× Million
1998	Judy and Mary	Pop Life	Million	Million
2000	Judy and Mary	Fresh	Million	Million
2001	Judy and Mary	Warp	Million	
2001	Judy and Mary	The Great Escape	Million	
1996	Tomomi Kahala	Love Brace	2× Million	
1997	Tomomi Kahala	Storytelling	Million	
1997	Makoto Kawamoto	Makoto Kawamoto	Million	
1997	Ryuichi Kawamura	Love	3× Million	
2003	Ketsumeishi	Ketsunopolis 3	Million	
2005	Ketsumeishi	Ketsunopolis 4	2× Million	
1997	KinKi Kids	A Album	Million	
1998	KinKi Kids	B Album	Million	
2000	KinKi Kids	KinKi Single Selection	Million	
1998	Kiroro	Nagai Aida: Kiroro no Mori	Million	
2005	Kobukuro	Nameless World	Million	
2006	Kobukuro	All Singles Best	3× Million	Compilation album
2007	Kobukuro	5296	Million	
2012	Kobukuro	All Singles Best 2	Million	Compilation album
1992	Kome Kome Club	Octave	3× Million	
1995	Kome Kome Club	Decade	Million	
2005	Kumi Koda	Best: First Things	2× Million	Compilation album
2006	Kumi Koda	Best: Second Session	2× Million	Compilation album
2006	Kumi Koda	Black Cherry	Million	
2000	Yuki Koyanagi	Expansion	Million	
1986	Toshinobu Kubota	Shake It Paradise	Million	
1987	Toshinobu Kubota	Groovin'	Million	
1988	Toshinobu Kubota	Such A Funky Thang!	Million	
1989	Toshinobu Kubota	The Baddest	Million	Compilation album
1990	Toshinobu Kubota	Bonga Wanga	Million	
2000	Mai Kuraki	Delicious Way	3× Million	
2001	Mai Kuraki	Perfect Crime	Million	
2004	Mai Kuraki	Wish You the Best	Million	Compilation album
1992	Keisuke Kuwata	From Yesterday	Million	Compilation album
1994	Keisuke Kuwata	Kodoku no Taiyou	Million	
2002	Keisuke Kuwata	Rock and Roll Hero	Million	
2002	Keisuke Kuwata	Top of the Pops	Million	Double-disc compilation album
1996	L'Arc-en-Ciel	True	Million	
1998	L'Arc-en-Ciel	Heart	Million	
1999	L'Arc-en-Ciel	ark	2× Million	
1999	L'Arc-en-Ciel	Ray	2× Million	
2000	L'Arc-en-Ciel	Real	Million	
2001	L'Arc-en-Ciel	Clicked Singles Best 13	Million	Compilation album
2011	Lady Gaga	The Fame	Million	
2002	Avril Lavigne	Let Go	Million	
2004	Avril Lavigne	Under My Skin	Million	
2007	Avril Lavigne	The Best Damn Thing	Million	
2001	Love Psychedelico	The Greatest Hits	Million	
1997	Luna Sea	Singles	Million	Compilation album
1998	Luna Sea	Shine	Million	
1992	Noriyuki Makihara	Kimi wa Boku no Takaramono	Million	
1993	Noriyuki Makihara	Self Portrait	Million	
1994	Noriyuki Makihara	Pharmacy	Million	
1997	Noriyuki Makihara	Smiling	Million	Compilation album
1999	Ricky Martin	Ricky Martin	Million	
1989	Yumi Matsutoya	Love Wars	Million	
1990	Yumi Matsutoya	The Gates of Heaven (Tengoku no Door)	2× Million	
1991	Yumi Matsutoya	Dawn Purple	2× Million	
1992	Yumi Matsutoya	Tears and Reasons	Million	
1993	Yumi Matsutoya	U-miz	Million	
1994	Yumi Matsutoya	The Dancing Sun	2× Million	
1995	Yumi Matsutoya	Kathmandu	Million	
1997	Yumi Matsutoya	Cowgirl Dreamin'	Million	
1998	Yumi Matsutoya	Neue Musik: Yumi Matsutoya Complete Best Vol.1	3× Million	Double-disc compilation album
2001	Yumi Matsutoya	Sweet, Bittersweet: Yuming Ballad Best	Million	Double-disc compilation album
2012	Yumi Matsutoya	The Best of Yumi Matsutoya 40th Anniversary	Million	Compilation album
1996	Max	Maximum	Million	
1997	Max	Maximum II	Million	
1998	Max	Maximum Groove	Million	
1999	Max	Maximum Collection	Million	Compilation album
1998	Misia	Mother Father Brother Sister	2× Million	
2000	Misia	Love Is the Message	2× Million	
2001	Misia	Marvelous	2× Million	
2002	Misia	Kiss in the Sky	Million	
2003	Misia	Misia Greatest Hits	2× Million	Compilation album
1995	Chisato Moritaka	Do the Best	Million	Compilation album
2000	Morning Musume	3rd-Love Paradise	Million	
2001	Morning Musume	Best! Morning Musume 1	2× Million	Compilation album
1992	Mr.Children	Kind of Love	Million	
1993	Mr.Children	Versus	Million	
1994	Mr.Children	Atomic Heart	3× Million	
1996	Mr.Children	Shinkai	2× Million	
1997	Mr.Children	Bolero	3× Million	
1999	Mr.Children	Discovery	Million	
2000	Mr.Children	Q	Million	
2001	Mr.Children	Mr. Children 1992-1995	2× Million	Compilation album
2001	Mr.Children	Mr. Children 1996-2000	2× Million	Compilation album
2002	Mr.Children	It's a Wonderful World	Million	
2004	Mr.Children	Shifuku no Oto	Million	
2005	Mr.Children	"Four Dimensions"	Million	EP
2005	Mr.Children	I Love U	Million	
2007	Mr.Children	Home	Million	
2008	Mr.Children	Supermarket Fantasy	Million	
2012	Mr.Children	Mr. Children 2001–2005 ＜micro＞	Million	Compilation album
2012	Mr.Children	Mr. Children 2005–2010 ＜macro＞	Million	Compilation album
1996	My Little Lover	Evergreen	3× Million	
1989	Tsuyoshi Nagabuchi	Showa	Million	
2002	Mika Nakashima	True	Million	
2003	Mika Nakashima	Love	Million	
2005	Mika Nakashima	Best	Million	Compilation album
1991	Kazumasa Oda	Oh! Yeah!	Million	
2002	Kazumasa Oda	Jiko Best	3× Million	Compilation album
1993	Maki Ohguro	Da Da Da	Million	
1994	Maki Ohguro	Eien no Yume ni Mukatte	Million	
1995	Maki Ohguro	La La La	Million	
1995	Maki Ohguro	Back Beats #1	3× Million	Compilation album
1997	Maki Ohguro	Power of Dreams	2× Million	
1997	Mayo Okamoto	Smile	Million	
2001	Chihiro Onitsuka	Insomnia	Million	
2004	Orange Range	musiQ	2× Million	
2005	Orange Range	Natural	Million	
1991	Yutaka Ozaki	Seventeen's Map (Jūnana-Sai no Chizu)	Million	Reissue (first released in 1983)
1992	Yutaka Ozaki	Confession for Exist (Hounetsu e no Akashi)	Million	Posthumous album
1996	Yutaka Ozaki	For All My Loves (Aisubeki Mono Subete ni)	Million	Compilation album
2001	Porno Graffitti	foo?	Million	
2004	Porno Graffitti	Porno Graffitti Best Red's	Million	Compilation album
2004	Porno Graffitti	Porno Graffitti Best Blue's	Million	Compilation album
1989	Princess Princess	Lovers	Million	
1990	Princess Princess	Princess Princess	Million	
1992	Princess Princess	Singles 1987–1992	Million	Compilation album
1996	Puffy	AmiYumi	Million	
1998	Puffy	Jet-CD	Million	
2004	Queen	Jewels	Million	Compilation album
2002	Rip Slyme	Tokyo Classic	Million	
2015	Sandaime J Soul Brothers	Planet Seven	Million	
1995	Scatman John	Scatman's World	Million	
1995	Sharam Q	Gambler	Million	
1996	Sharam Q	Single Best 10	Million	Compilation album
1998	Shazna	Gold Sun and Silver Moon	Million	
1999	Ringo Sheena	Muzai Moratorium	Million	
2000	Ringo Sheena	Shouso Strip	2× Million	
2001	SMAP	Smap Vest	2× Million	Compilation album
2016	SMAP	Smap 25 Years	Million	Compilation album
1997	Speed	Starting Over	2× Million	Studio album
1998	Speed	Rise	3× Million	Studio album
1998	Speed	Moment	3× Million	Compilation album
1999	Speed	Carry On My Way	Million	Studio album
1990	Southern All Stars	Southern All Stars	Million	
1990	Southern All Stars	Inamura Jane	Million	Motion picture soundtrack
1992	Southern All Stars	Yo ni Manyou no Hana ga Saku nari	3× Million	
1996	Southern All Stars	Young Love	2× Million	
1998	Southern All Stars	Umi no Yeah!!	4× Million	Double-disc compilation album
1998	Southern All Stars	Sakura	Million	
2000	Southern All Stars	Ballad 3: The Album of Love	2× Million	Double-disc compilation album
2005	Southern All Stars	Killer Street	Million	Double album
1995	Spitz	Hachimitsu	Million	
1996	Spitz	Indigo Chiheisen	Million	
1999	Spitz	Recycle: Greatest Hits of Spitz	Million	Compilation album
1999	Ami Suzuki	SA	2× Million	
2000	Ami Suzuki	Infinity Eighteen Vol. 1	Million	
1995	Masayuki Suzuki	Martini II	Million	Compilation album
1992	Mariya Takeuchi	Quiet Life	Million	
1994	Mariya Takeuchi	Impressions	3× Million	Compilation album
2001	Mariya Takeuchi	Bon Appetit!	Million	
2008	Mariya Takeuchi	Expressions	Million	Compilation album
2003	t.A.T.u.	200 km/h in the Wrong Lane	Million	
1998	T.M. Revolution	Triple Joker	Million	
1999	T.M. Revolution	The Force	Million	
1992	T-Bolan	So Bad	Million	
1993	T-Bolan	Heart of Stone	Million	
1996	T-Bolan	Singles	Million	Compilation album
1999	TLC	FanMail	Million	
2005	Hideaki Tokunaga	Vocalist	Million	
2007	Hideaki Tokunaga	Vocalist 3	Million	
2003	Twelve Girls Band	Beautiful Energy	Million	
1994	TRF	Word Groove	Million	
1994	TRF	Billionaire	Million	
1995	TRF	Dance to Positive	2× Million	
1995	TRF	Hyper Mix 4	Million	
1995	TRF	Brand-New Tomorrow	Million	
1998	TRF	Works	Million	Compilation album
1989	Tube	Tubest	Million	Compilation album
1993	Tube	Roman no Natsu	Million	
1994	Tube	Owaranai Natsu ni	Million	
1994	Tube	Melodies & Memories	Million	
1995	Tube	Yuzurenai Natsu	Million	
1996	Tube	Tubest II	Million	Compilation album
2000	Tube	Tubest III	Million	Compilation album
1996	Ulfuls	Banzai	Million	
1993	Unicorn	The Very Best of Unicorn	Million	Compilation album
1999	Hikaru Utada	First Love	8× Million	
2001	Hikaru Utada	Distance	4× Million	
2002	Hikaru Utada	Deep River	3× Million	
2004	Hikaru Utada	Utada Hikaru Single Collection Vol. 1	3× Million	Compilation album
2004	Hikaru Utada	Exodus	Million	Released under the stage name "Utada"
2006	Hikaru Utada	Ultra Blue	Million	
2008	Hikaru Utada	Heart Station	Million	
1993	Wands	Toki no Tobira	2× Million	
1993	Wands	Little Bit…	Million	
1995	Wands	Piece of My Soul	Million	
1991	X Japan	Jealousy	Million	
1993	X Japan	X Singles	Million	Compilation album
1995	Tatsuro Yamashita	Treasures	Million	Compilation album
1998	Tatsuro Yamashita	Cozy	Million	
1996	The Yellow Monkey	Triad Years Act 1: The Very Best of the Yellow Monkey	Million	Compilation album
1999	Yuzu	Yuzuen	Million	
2000	Yuzu	Tobira	Million	
1996	Miwa Yoshida	Beauty and Harmony	Million	
1993	Z-Dan	Enoshima: Southern All Stars Golden Hits Medley	Million	
1992	Zard	Hold Me	Million	
1993	Zard	Yureru Omoi	3× Million	
1994	Zard	Oh My Love	2× Million	
1995	Zard	Forever You	Million	
1996	Zard	Today Is Another Day	Million	
1997	Zard	Zard Blend: Sun & Stone	2× Million	Compilation album
1999	Zard	Eien	Million	
1999	Zard	Zard Best the Single Collection: Kiseki	3× Million	Compilation album
1999	Zard	Zard Best: Requested Memorial	Million	Compilation album
2006	Zard	Golden Best: 15th Anniversary	Million	Compilation album
1992	Whitney Houston / Various artists	The Bodyguard	2× Million	Motion picture soundtrack
2003	Various artists	Winter Sonata	Million	Korean drama soundtrack
2007	Various artists	R35 Sweet J-Ballads	Million	Compilation album
2014	Various artists	Anna and the Snow Queen Original Soundtrack	Million	Motion picture soundtrack

== Best-selling albums by year ==
Sales figures derived from Oricon. All albums that have sold over one million copies in Japan are by Japanese artists, with the exception of BTS's BTS, the Best.

Year	Album	Artist	Sales	Ref.
1989	Delight Slight Light Kiss	Yumi Matsutoya	1,575,510	
1990	Love Wars	Yumi Matsutoya	1,602,230	
1991	The Gates of Heaven	Yumi Matsutoya	1,975,080	
1992	Super Best II	Chage and Aska	2,543,290	
1993	Yureru Omoi	Zard	2,230,900	
1994	Magic	Dreams Come True	2,584,400	
1995	Delicious	Dreams Come True	2,910,330	
1996	Globe	Globe	3,762,610	
1997	Review	Glay	3,333,470	
1998	B'z The Best "Pleasure"	B'z	5,034,980	
1999	First Love	Hikaru Utada	7,365,830	
2000	Delicious Way	Mai Kuraki	3,451,660	
2001	Distance	Hikaru Utada	4,404,290	
2002	Deep River	Hikaru Utada	3,526,780	
2003	Second to None	Chemistry	2,001,917	
2004	Utada Hikaru Single Collection Vol. 1	Hikaru Utada	2,495,967	
2005	musiQ	Orange Range	2,630,763	
2006	Ken Hirai 10th Anniversary Complete Single Collection '95-'05 Utabaka	Ken Hirai	2,070,766	
2007	Home	Mr. Children	1,181,241	
2008	Exile Love	Exile	1,470,959	
2009	All the Best! 1999–2009	Arashi	1,432,000	
2010	Boku no Miteiru Fūkei	Arashi	1,053,064	
2011	Beautiful World	Arashi	907,589	
2012	Mr. Children 2005–2010 ＜macro＞	Mr. Children	1,170,298	
2013	Love	Arashi	796,525	
2014	Tsugi no Ashiato	AKB48	1,041,355	
2015	Japonism	Arashi	981,639	
2016	Are You Happy?	Arashi	747,115	
2017	Finally	Namie Amuro	1,777,850	
2018	Finally	Namie Amuro	638,939	
2019	5x20 All the Best!! 1999–2019	Arashi	2,100,438	
2020	Stray Sheep	Kenshi Yonezu	1,970,930	
2021	BTS, the Best	BTS	1,066,156	
2022	Snow Labo. S2	Snow Man	986,018	
2023	Mr.5	King & Prince	1,399,236	
2024	Rays	Snow Man	1,162,227	
2025	The Best 2020–2025	Snow Man	1,896,674	

== See also ==
- List of best-selling albums of the 1980s (Japan)
- RIAJ certification
- List of best-selling albums by country
- List of best-selling singles in Japan
- Oricon
- Oricon Singles Chart
- Oricon Albums Chart
- Big in Japan
