= Nando Demo =

Single by Dreams Come True

from the album The Love Rocks
- B-side: "Sora wo Yomu (空を読む)"
- Released: February 16, 2005
- Genre: J-pop
- Length: 7:04
- Label: Universal Music
- Songwriters: Miwa Yoshida; Masato Nakamura
- Producer: Dreams Come True

Dreams Come True singles chronology
"Love Letter" (2004)	"Nando Demo" (2005)	"JET!!!/SUNSHINE" (2005)

Official Music Video
- "何度でも" on YouTube

"Nando Demo" (何度でも; lit. "Any number of times") is the 35th single by Japanese pop band Dreams Come True, released on February 16, 2005, by Universal Music Japan. It was the group's first single in four months since their last single, "Love Letter," and was later included as an album version on their 13th album, The Love Rocks. Both songs were eventually included in the all-time best album Dreams Come True The Best! Watashi no Dorikamu.

A commercial success in Japan, "Nando Demo" peaked at number three on the Oricon Singles Chart and sold 191,366 copies by the end of the year, making it the 50th best-selling single in the country in 2005. Since then the single has sold 195,294 physical copies. "Nando Demo" was certified four times by the RIAJ in different categories, including double platinum for digital sales, triple platinum in chaku-uta (ringtone sales), and platinum in physical shipments. In 2011, the song charted for the first time on the Billboard Japan Hot 100, reaching number 12.

== Background and release ==
"Nando Demo" was written for the theme song of Fuji Television's dorama "Emergency Room 24 Hours (3rd series)". The first song produced at the request was not accepted, so a new song was produced, which became "Nando Demo". This is the second theme song for "Emergency Room 24 Hours" following " Asa ga Mata Kuru " from the first series (1999) and "Itsu no Ma ni" from the second series (2001), followed by the theme song for the fourth series (2009). They also sang the theme song for the 5th series (2013). The song was also used as the theme song for the 2007 movie Mayu - Kokoro no Hoshi - and in 2013 as the commercial song for "Sumitomo Life Insurance Company" featuring Mao Asada. Meanwhile, the B-side "Sora wo Yomu" served as the ending theme for Kyushu Asahi Broadcasting's "Duòmo" in 2015.

== Commercial performance ==
"Nando Demo" debuted at number three on the Oricon Singles Chart, with 65,017 copies sold in its first week. The single dropped to number five the following week, logging sales of 33,853 units. It slid to number 10 on the charts on its third week, shifting 23,973 units. The single managed to chart in the top 100 for a total of twenty-two weeks. "Nando Demo" ranked at number 50 on the year-end Oricon Singles Chart for 2005 with sales of 191,366 copies.

== Live performances ==
The song was sung at the 56th NHK Kohaku Uta Gassen in 2005 and at the 57th NHK Kohaku Uta Gassen in 2006. Since the 57th Kohaku, the song has also been performed in combination with "Love Love Love" in the form of "Nando Demo LOVE LOVE LOVE."

== Legacy ==
After the 2011 Tōhoku earthquake and tsunami occurred, "Nando Demo" became the most aired song on Japanese contemporary hit radio stations nationwide. In addition, as an appeal to the victims of the earthquake and tsunami, the song's full ringtone was distributed for free between March 28 and April 27, 2011. In April 2020, the song was used as a message song for the "#Yell to the Front Lines Again and Again" project organized by the Japanese Red Cross Society and Universal Music in response to the spread of the COVID-19, to support medical workers nationwide who were on the front lines of healthcare.

== Track listing ==
All lyrics written by Miwa Yoshida, all compositions by Masato Nakamura and Miwa Yoshida, all arrangements by Masato Nakamura.

CD
No.	Title	Length
1.	"Nando Demo" (何度でも "Any number of times")	3:42
2.	"Sora wo Yomu" (空を読む "Read the sky")	3:20
Total length:		7:04

== Chart rankings ==
Chart (2005)	Peak position
Oricon weekly singles	3
Oricon yearly singles	50

Chart (2011)	Peak position
Japan (Japan Hot 100)	12

== Sales and certifications ==
Region	Certification	Certified units/sales
Japan (RIAJ) Digital single	3× Platinum	750,000^{*}
Japan (RIAJ) Physical single	Platinum	195,294
Japan (RIAJ) Chaku-Uta	2× Platinum	500,000^{*}
Japan (RIAJ) Chaku-Uta Full	Platinum	250,000^{*}
Streaming
Japan (RIAJ)	Platinum	100,000,000^{†}
^{*} Sales figures based on certification alone.^{†} Streaming-only figures based on certification alone.
