= Dreams Come True The Best! Watashi no Dorikamu =

2015 album by Dreams Come True

Greatest hits album by Dreams Come True
- Released: July 7, 2015
- Label: Universal Sigma

Dreams Come True chronology
Attack25 (2014)	Dreams Come True The Best! Watashi no Dorikamu (2015)	Dreams Come True The Ura Best! Watashi Dake no Dorikamu (2016)

Dreams Come True The Best! Watashi no Dorikamu (DREAMS COME TRUE THE BEST! 私のドリカム) is a 2015 greatest hits album by the Japanese band Dreams Come True. It was released on July 7, 2015. It was number-one on the Oricon Weekly Albums Chart for six non-consecutive weeks. It was the third best-selling album of 2015 in Japan according to the Oricon Yearly Albums Chart, with 828,505 copies sold.

== Track listing ==
Disc 1: Love
No.	Title	Length
1.	"Ureshii! Tanoshii! Daisuki!" (うれしい！たのしい！大好き！)
2.	"Kessen wa Kinyōbi" (決戦は金曜日)
3.	"Jet!!!" (album version)
4.	"Tsuretette Tsuretette" (連れてって 連れてって)
5.	"Osaka Lover" (大阪Lover)
6.	"Ai ga Tadoritsuku Basho" (愛がたどりつく場所)
7.	"Ring!Ring!Ring!"
8.	"Eyes to Me"
9.	"Jikan Ryokō" (時間旅行)
10.	"The Signs of Love"
11.	"Hoshizoraga Utsuru Umi" (星空が映る海)
12.	"Mirai Yosōzu" (version '07; 未来予想図)
13.	"Mirai Yosōzu II" (version '07; 未来予想図Ⅱ)
14.	"Aishiteru no Sign (Watashitachi no Mirai Yosōzu)" (ア・イ・シ・テ・ルのサイン ～ わたしたちの未来予想図 ～)
15.	"Winter Song"
16.	"Love Love Love"

Disc 2: Tears
No.	Title	Length
1.	"Ano Natsu no Hanabi" (あの夏の花火)
2.	"Suki" (すき)
3.	"Aishiteru Aishiteta" (愛してる 愛してた)
4.	"Crescent Moon" (三日月)
5.	"Memai" (めまい)
6.	"Mascara Matsuge" (マスカラまつげ)
7.	"Moshimo Yukinara" (もしも雪なら)
8.	"Yasashii Kiss o Shite" (やさしいキスをして)
9.	"Kanashii Kiss" (悲しいKiss)
10.	"Wasurenaide" (忘れないで)
11.	"Snow Dance"
12.	"Lat. 43°N (Forty-Three Degrees North Latitude)"
13.	"Sayonara"
14.	"Anata ni Aitakute" (あなたに会いたくて)
15.	"Kohaku no Tsuki" (琥珀の月)
16.	"Chinbotsu-sen no Monkey Girl" (沈没船のモンキーガール)

Disc 3: Life
No.	Title	Length
1.	"Sono Saki e" (その先へ; featuring Fuzzy Control)
2.	"Asa ga Matakuru" (朝がまた来る)
3.	"Nee" (ねぇ)
4.	"Again"
5.	"Sora o Yomu" (空を読む)
6.	"Nando Demo" (何度でも)
7.	"Kimi ni Shika Kikoenai" (きみにしか聞こえない)
8.	"Sā Kane o Narase" (さぁ鐘を鳴らせ)
9.	"True, Baby True"
10.	"24/7 (Twenty Four/Seven)"
11.	"Thank You" (サンキュ．)
12.	"Megane-goshi no Sora" (眼鏡越しの空)
13.	"Egao no Yukue" (笑顔の行方)
14.	"Happy Happy Birthday"
15.	"Anata ni Salad" (あなたにサラダ)
16.	"Merry-Life-Goes-Round"
17.	"Hare Tare Ii Ne" (晴れたらいいね)
18.	"Matane" (またね; album version)

== Charts ==
Chart (2015)	Peak position
Japan (Oricon Weekly Albums Chart)	1

=== Year-end charts ===
Chart (2015)	Peak position
Japan (Oricon Yearly Albums Chart)	3
