= Go For It! =

"Go for It!"

Single by Dreams Come True

from the album Magic
- B-side: "Ame no Owaru Basho"
- Released: September 9, 1993
- Recorded: 1993
- Genre: Pop; funk
- Length: 4:14
- Label: Epic Records Japan
- Songwriter: Miwa Yoshida
- Producers: Dreams Come True; Mike Pela

Dreams Come True singles chronology
"Haretara Ii ne" (1992)	"Go for It!" (1993)	"Winter Song" (1994)

"Go for It!" is the 13th single by the Japanese band Dreams Come True, which also served as the lead single for their sixth studio album Magic (1993). It was released on September 9, 1993, by Epic Records Japan. It was the only single released by the group that year. "Go for It!" was the advertising song for Shiseido's product "Rescente" starring Miwa Yoshida, the lead singer of Dreams Come True.

== Composition ==
"Go for It!" was written by Miwa Yoshida, arranged by Masato Nakamura and co-produced by the band and Mike Pela. The single was mastered by Tim Young at Metropolis Mastering. The song is written in the key of F minor with a common time tempo of 88 beats per minute.

== Critical reception ==
CDJournal critics described the song as "Probably the only love song in the world featuring a "Monty Python-loving lover"." It was praised for having a relaxed sound throughout that perfectly matches the fun-loving mood of the lyrics about a couple with "too many different interests.

== Chart performance ==
"Go for It!" debuted at the top spot of the Oricon Singles Chart with 429,110 copies sold in its first week of availability. The single resided at number one for a second week, selling 186,050 copies. It slid to number two the following week, logging sales of 132,660 copies. The single spent an additional three weeks in the top ten. It charted in the top 100 for sixteen weeks, selling a reported total of 1,052,000 copies, making it Dreams Come True's second million-selling single. Because it sold 1,043,290 copies in 1993, it finished as the sixteenth best-performing single of that year.

== Track listing ==
All lyrics are written by Miwa Yoshida.

No.	Title	Music	Arranger(s)	Length
1.	"Go for It!"	Miwa Yoshida; Masato Nakamura	Nakamura	4:14
2.	"Ame no Owaru Basho" (雨の終わる場所, "The Place Where the Rain Stops")	Nakamura	Nakamura	4:35
Total length:				8:42

== Charts ==
Chart (1993)	Peak position
Japan Weekly Singles (Oricon)	1
Japan Monthly Singles (Oricon)	1
Japan Yearly Singles (Oricon)	16

== Certification and sales ==
Region	Certification	Certified units/sales
Japan (RIAJ)	Million	1,052,000

== See also ==
- List of Oricon number-one singles
