= Tsuretette Tsuretette =

Single by Dreams Come True

from the album Do You Dreams Come True?
- Released: November 12, 2008
- Genre: J-pop
- Length: 5:16
- Label: Universal Music
- Songwriter: Miwa Yoshida
- Producers: Miwa Yoshida; Masato Nakamura

Dreams Come True singles chronology
"Merry-Life-Goes-Round" / "True, Baby True." (2008)	"Tsuretette Tsuretette" (2008)	"Good Bye My School Days" (2009)

"Tsuretette Tsuretette" (連れてって 連れてって; "Taking Along, Taking Along") is a single by Japanese pop duo Dreams Come True, from their fifteenth studio album, Do You Dreams Come True? (2009), released on November 12, 2009, through Universal Music Japan. The title track was written by the band's singer and songwriter Miwa Yoshida, and produced by Masato Nakamura. The single debuted at number one on the Oricon Singles Chart, becoming the group's first single to top the chart in ten years. It has sold about 86,000 copies in Japan and has been certified Gold by the Recording Industry Association of Japan (RIAJ).

== Track listing ==
All lyrics are written by Miwa Yoshida, and all songs arranged by Masato Nakamura.

Regular edition
No.	Title	Music	Length
1.	"Tsuretette Tsuretette"	Masato Nakamura	5:16
2.	"Almost Home"	M. Nakamura; Miwa Yoshida	5:56
3.	"Middle of Nowhere"	M. Nakamura; M. Yoshida	4:10
Total length:			15:22

== Charts and certifications ==
Chart (2008)	Peak position
Oricon Singles Chart	1
Billboard Japan Hot 100	1
Billboard Japan Adult Contemporary Airplay	19
RIAJ Reco-kyō Chart	14

=== Sales and certifications ===
Chart	Amount
Oricon physical sales	86,000
RIAJ physical shipments	Gold
RIAJ full-length cellphone downloads	Gold
