= Magic (Dreams Come True album) =

Studio album by Dreams Come True
- Released: December 4, 1993
- Recorded: 1993
- Studio: The Hit Factory (London); Sony Music Shinanomachi (Tokyo); Kannonzaki Marine
- Genre: J-pop; R&B
- Length: 45:35
- Label: Epic Records Japan
- Producer: Mike Pela; Dreams Come True

Dreams Come True chronology
The Swinging Star (1992)	Magic (1993)	Delicious (1995)

Singles from Magic
- 1. "Go for It!" Released: September 9, 1993

Magic is the sixth studio album by Japanese pop band Dreams Come True. It was released on December 4, 1993, by Epic Records Japan. Musically, it is a pop album with funk, jazz, R&B and doo-wop influences from Western music. Lyrics were solely provided by frontwoman Miwa Yoshida while its songs were arranged by her alongside her bandmate Masato Nakamura.

Commercially, Magic was a huge success, reaching number one on Oricon and selling over two million copies, while receiving a double million certification by the Recording Industry Association of Japan (RIAJ). It also became the first album in nine years to top the Oricon Albums Chart for seven weeks. The album's commercial success won the band numerous awards in their motherland Japan. To promote this album, they held the concert tour Dreams Come True Concert Tour Magic Journey.

== Background ==
The only single to be released from Magic is "Go for It!", which was released on September 9, 1993. This was the only single released by Dreams Come True in 1993. The song was used in Shiseido's "Rescente" commercial in the fall of 1993, and was also an insert song for the film July 7th, Sunny Day (1996). The single reached number one on the weekly Oricon Singles Chart and charted for fourteen weeks, selling 1,052,000 copies. Because it sold 1,043,290 copies in 1993, it finished as the sixteenth best-performing single of the year. Following "Kessen wa Kinyōbi," this was their second single to sell over a million copies.

Yoshida's vocals for the album Magic were recorded at various studios throughout 1993, recording at studios in Japan and London. The album was mastered by Tim Young at Metropolis Mastering.

== Reception ==
Commercially, Magic was very successful in Japan. It debuted at number one on the Oricon Albums Chart, with 1,140,460 copies sold in its first week. It topped the Oricon weekly rankings for seven consecutive weeks, the first time an album accomplished this in about nine years since Southern All Stars' Kamakura (1985). By June 1994, Epic Records Japan reported that the album had sold over 2.6 million copies across the country. Magic was certified double million by the Recording Industry Association of Japan (RIAJ) for selling over two million copies. Dreams Come True won the number one album ranking in 1994 with this album, followed by the next album, Delicious, in 1995, making it their second consecutive album ranking victory. Magic is the band's third highest-selling LP according to Oricon Style. It is also the twenty-fifth best-selling album in Japan for the 1990s decade. The album won the Best Album and Best Female Album awards at the 8th Annual Japan Gold Disc Awards.

== Track listing ==
All tracks are written by Miwa Yoshida. All arrangements are by Masato Nakamura.

Magic track listing
No.	Title	Arranger	Length
1.	"...And Then?"	Masato Nakamura	1:11
2.	"Lovetide"	Masato Nakamura	4:14
3.	"Go for It!"	Miwa Yoshida and Masato Nakamura	4:14
4.	"Fuyuzōmi ni wa Mada Tooi (冬三昧にはまだ遠い, It's Still a Long Way from Winter)"	Miwa Yoshida and Masato Nakamura	4:07
5.	"I'm a Liar"	Masato Nakamura	4:14
6.	"A Little Waltz"	Miwa Yoshida	3:26
7.	"Hanagumori no Nichiyōbi (花曇りの日曜日, Sunday of the Hazy Weather in Spring)"	Masato Nakamura	4:09
8.	"Iron na Kimochi (いろんな気持ち, Various Feelings)"	Masato Nakamura	5:07
9.	"Aishiteru Aishiteta (愛してる 愛してた, I Love You, I Loved You)"	Miwa Yoshida	4:29
10.	"Ame no Owaru Basho (雨の終わる場所, The Place Where the Rain Stops)"	Masato Nakamura	4:35
11.	"Fantasia #1"	Masato Nakamura	4:34
12.	"Happy Happy Birthday"	Miwa Yoshida	1:15

== Charts ==
=== Weekly charts ===
Chart (1993–1994)	Peak position
Japanese Albums (Oricon)	1

=== Year-end charts ===
Chart (1994)	Position
Japanese Albums (Oricon)	1

=== Decade-end charts ===
Chart (1990–1999)	Position
Japanese Albums (Oricon)	25

=== All-time chart ===
Chart	Position
Japanese Albums (Oricon)	37

== Certifications and sales ==
Certifications and sales for Magic
Region	Certification	Certified units/sales
Japan (RIAJ)	2× Million	2,578,000
