= Love Goes On =

Love Goes On may refer to:

== Albums ==
- Love Goes On (Dreams Come True album) or the title song, 1989
- Love Goes On (Paulette Carlson album) or the title song, 1991
- Love Goes On, by Andrea Zonn, 2003
- Love Goes On, by Nana Mouskouri, 1976

== Songs ==
- "Love Goes On" (song), by the Go-Betweens, 1989
- "Love Goes On", by Hannah Diamond from Reflections, 2019
- "Love Goes On", by Jon English from It's All a Game, 1974

== See also ==
- "And Love Goes On", a song by Earth, Wind & Fire, 1981
- "Love Goes On and On", a song by Lindsey Stirling from Artemis, 2019
