= Love Unlimited (Dreams Come True album) =

Studio album by Dreams Come True
- Released: April 1, 1996
- Recorded: 1995–1996
- Studio: Air Studios (London); Hitokuchi-zaka Studio (Tokyo); Woodstock Karuizawa Recording Studio (Karuizawa); Electric Lady Studios (New York City)
- Genre: J-Pop; new wave; contemporary R&B; baroque pop; soul; city pop; funk
- Length: 46:04
- Label: Epic Records Japan
- Producer: Mike Pela; Dreams Come True

Dreams Come True chronology
Delicious (1995)	Love Unlimited (1996)	Sing or Die (1997)

Singles from LOVE UNLIMITED∞
- 1. "Love Love Love" Released: July 24, 1995; 2. "Romance" Released: October 30, 1995

Love Unlimited∞ (stylized as "LOVE UNLIMITED∞") is the eighth studio album by Japanese band Dreams Come True. It was released in Japan and throughout Asia on April 1, 1996, through Epic Records Japan, ultimately being their last album released under the label. The record's lyrics were entirely written by Miwa Yoshida herself, while the song's compositions were handled by her alongside bandmates Takahiro Nishikawa and Masato Nakamura. Musically, Love Unlimited∞ is a pop and R&B album and lyrically focuses on themes of love. Two music videos are included on the CD-EXTRA of the Japanese version only. They are not included on the local versions sold in Taiwan, Hong Kong, etc. The slogan on the obi is, as the title suggests, "Love has no limits."

A commercial success, Love Unlimited∞ became their sixth consecutive chart-topping album in Japan, debuting at number one on the Oricon Albums Chart and becoming the eighth most popular album of the year. It stayed on the chart for 24 weeks, including ten weeks in the top ten, and was their fifth consecutive effort to sell over two million copies nationwide. To promote this album, the concert tour DREAMS COME TRUE CONCERT TOUR '96 LOVE UNLIMITED∞ was held.

== Background ==
Love Unlimited∞ spawned 2 singles. The lead single, "Love Love Love," is the group's most successful single on the Oricon Singles Chart to date and became a cultural phenomenon. Serving as the theme song to the TBS dorama Aishiteiru to Itte Kure, it was the best-performing single in Japan in 1995 and is now the tenth best-selling Japanese single in history with a staggering 2,489,000 copies sold throughout its chart life. The second single, "Romance," was also a commercial success, topping the Oricon chart and has since been certified Double Platinum. The track "Jyuugatsu Nanaka, Hare" was the theme song to the movie of the same name. A music video was made for the song, but it has never been released as a commercial single.

The record was entirely written by Miwa Yoshida herself, while the composition was handled by her alongside bandmates Masato Nakamura and Takahiro Nishikawa. Much of the recording of Love Unlimited∞ was done in Japan, with additional recording in London and New York City. Material from the album was mastered by Masterdisk.

== Reception ==
Upon release, Love Unlimited∞ was commercially successful within Japan, premiering atop the record chart with 1,293,920 copies sold in the first week, making it the 29th fastest-selling album in Japan. It charted in the top ten for ten weeks. Love Unlimited∞ went on to sell over 2.43 million copies nationwide, eventually becoming the 44th best-selling album in the history of the Oricon Albums Chart. It is also the thirty-first best selling album in Japan in the 1990s. Love Unlimited∞ went on to be certified Double Million by the Recording Industry Association of Japan (RIAJ) for physical shipments of two million units. Love Unlimited∞ is the band's fourth best-selling LP according to Oricon Style.

== Track listing ==
All lyrics are written by Miwa Yoshida.

CD / Digital download
No.	Title	Music	Arranger(s)	Length
1.	"LOVE UNLIMITED"	Miwa Yoshida; Masato Nakamura	Masato Nakamura	0:55
2.	"SWEET REVENGE"	Masato Nakamura	Masato Nakamura	3:58
3.	"Chikai (誓い)"	Miwa Yoshida	Miwa Yoshida	3:52
4.	"ROMANCE～∞ VERSION"	Masato Nakamura	Masato Nakamura	5:30
5.	"Arashi ga Kuru (嵐が来る)" (Album Version)	Masato Nakamura	Masato Nakamura	4:31
6.	"Omoide wo Mune ni Himeta Mama (思い出を胸に秘めたまま)"	Takahiro Nishikawa; Masato Nakamura	Masato Nakamura	3:59
7.	"Monkey Girl Gouka Kyakusen no Tabi (モンキーガール 豪華客船の旅)"	Miwa Yoshida	Masato Nakamura	3:42
8.	"Ie e Kaero (家へ帰ろ)"	Masato Nakamura	Masato Nakamura	3:45
9.	"Jyuugatsu Nanaka, Hare (7月7日、晴れ)"	Masato Nakamura	Masato Nakamura	4:12
10.	"Douyatte Wasureyou (どうやって忘れよう)"	Miwa Yoshida	Masato Nakamura	3:55
11.	"LOVE LOVE LOVE"	Masato Nakamura	Masato Nakamura	3:43
12.	"Shiawase na Karada (しあわせなからだ)"	Miwa Yoshida	Masato Nakamura	3:54
Total length:				46:04

== Charts and sales ==
=== Weekly charts ===
Chart (1996)	Peak position
Japanese Albums (Oricon)	1
Taiwanese International Albums (IFPI)	6

=== Year-end charts ===
Chart (1996)	Peak position
Japanese Albums (Oricon)	8

=== Decade-end charts ===
Chart (1990–1999)	Position
Japanese Albums (Oricon)	31

=== All-time chart ===
Chart	Peak position
Japanese Albums (Oricon)	44

== Sales and certifications ==
Region	Certification	Certified units/sales
Japan (RIAJ)	2× Million	2,433,740
Taiwan (RIT)	2× Platinum	105,014
