= Ken Sueda =

Japanese video director

Takeshi Sueda
- Born: 1974; Japan
- Died: 26 September 2007 (aged 32–33); Japan
- Occupation: Video director

Takeshi Sueda (末田 健, Sueda Takeshi) was a Japanese video director. He worked for the JWT Japan advertising agency and began directing music videos in 1998. He went on to work for video production company SeP, Inc., and established a successful career.

Sueda directed a number of videos for the Japanese pop band Dreams Come True and married the lead singer Miwa Yoshida in 2004, but the couple never registered the marriage. Sueda was still married to a previous wife when the couple met on a video shoot, but divorced in 2003. In September 2007, Sueda died of germinoma, a cancerous tumour of the brain, at the age of 33.
