= Suki (song) =

Single by Dreams Come True

from the album Delicious
- Released: November 4, 1994
- Genre: Pop; gospel; soul
- Length: 3:39
- Label: Epic/Sony Records
- Songwriter: Miwa Yoshida
- Producers: Dreams Come True; Mike Pela

Dreams Come True singles chronology
"Wherever You Are" (1994)	"Suki" (1994)	"Thank You." (1995)

Audio sample
- "Suki": file; help

"Suki" (すき; lit. "I Love You") is a song recorded by Japanese band Dreams Come True for their seventh studio album, Delicious (1995). It was released as the album's lead single by Epic/Sony Records on November 4, 1994. An English version of the song, dubbed "Suki (Worldwide Version)", was featured on the 1996 film Shichigatsu Nanoka, Hare, starring Alisa Mizuki and Masato Hagiwara.

== Composition ==
"Suki" was written and composed by Miwa Yoshida, arranged by Masato Nakamura and co-produced by the band and Mike Pela. The song is written in the key of F-sharp major with a common time tempo of 65 beats per minute. Yoshida's vocals span three octaves, from F♯_{3} to C♯_{5} in modal voice, and up to F♯_{6} in head voice.

== Critical reception ==
CDJournal critics called "Suki" a gospel-tinged love song. Yoshida, who is accompanied by a live piano only, unlike on the album version which also includes a strings section, was praised for producing a vocal performance that serves as the "main instrument" of the track. The backing gospel choir was also praised for delivering the lyrics with gravitas and style. Gackt, who covered the song in 2017, has praised Yoshida's lyrics about heartbreak and considers "Suki" to be his favorite love song.

== Cover versions ==
In 2005, Mink recorded a cover of "Suki" for her eponymous debut album, Mink. In 2010, Juju recorded her rendition of the song for the cover album Request. Crystal Kay has covered the song twice, once as a dance-pop rendition, included as a B-side to the single "One" (2008), and a second time, as a piano ballad in the vein of the original song, which was also included as a B-side to the single "Lovin' You" (2016). She also performed the song live at the tribute concert Minna de Dori Suru? Do You Dreams Come True Special Live held on March 10, 2009 in celebration of their 20th anniversary.

== Chart performance ==
"Suki" debuted at number one on the Oricon Singles Chart, with 181,450 copies sold in its first week. It dropped to number five the next week, selling 103,420 copies. The single stayed in the top ten one last week, ranking at number nine and selling 65,990 copies. "Suki" then slid to number eleven, where it stayed for two consecutive weeks, before dropping to number 17 on its sixth charting week and out of the top twenty entirely the following week. With only three weeks worth of sales counting toward the tally, "Suki" ranked at number 77 on the year-end Oricon Singles Chart for 1994. The single charted in the top 100 for sixteen weeks and sold a reported total of 590,580 copies.

== Track listing ==
All lyrics are written by Miwa Yoshida.

No.	Title	Music	Arranger(s)	Length
1.	"Suki" (すき, "I Love You")	Miwa Yoshida	Masato Nakamura	3:39
2.	"Kizuite yo" (きづいてよ, "Notice Me")	Nakamura	Nakamura	4:23
Total length:				8:02

== Charts ==
Chart (1994)	Peak position
Japan Weekly Singles (Oricon)	1
Japan Monthly Singles (Oricon)	5
Japan Yearly Singles (Oricon)	77

== Certification and sales ==
Region	Certification	Certified units/sales
Japan (RIAJ)	Platinum	590,580

== See also ==
- List of Oricon number-one singles
