= Takahiro Nishikawa =

Japanese keyboardist (born 1964)

Takahiro Nishikawa 西川隆宏
- Born: 26 May 1964 (age 61)
- Genres: Pop, new wave, jazz, R&B
- Occupation: Keyboardist
- Instrument: Keyboard
- Years active: 1988–2002
- Formerly of: Dreams Come True
- Website: bar-reboot.com

Takahiro Nishikawa (西川隆宏, Nishikawa Takahiro; born 26 May 1964) is a Japanese keyboardist, music producer, and businessman. He was a member of Dreams Come True from 1988 to 2002. While with the band, they released eleven studio albums and thirty-three singles. Nine of those albums and ten of the singles debuted at #1 on the Oricon charts.

While Nishikawa was a member of the band, Dreams Come True won two The Television Drama Academy Awards for theme songs, once in 1995 and again in 1999. After he left the band, he was arrested and convicted twice for possession of illegal stimulants, once in October 2002 and again in February 2006. He opened a bar in Sapporo in 2009, where he regularly holds events themed around his former band, including after-concert parties.

Nishikawa is also known by the nickname Nihya (ニーヒャ, Nīhya). His younger sister, Ayumi Nishikawa (西川歩, Nishikawa Ayumi), is a model.

== Biography ==
Takahiro Nishikawa was born 26 May 1964. He attended and graduated from Hokkaido Otofuke High School in Otofuke, Hokkaido.

In 1988, Nishikawa became a founding member of the band Dreams Come True as their keyboardist. Their first single, "Anata ni Aitakute" (あなたに会いたくて; "I Miss You"), was released in March 1989. Their first album, Dreams Come True, sold over one million copies. While with the band, they released eleven studio albums, nine of which debuted at #1 on the Oricon charts. In that same time period, they released 33 singles, and 10 of them debuted at #1 on the Oricon singles charts. As a band member, he acquired the nickname Nihya (ニーヒャ, Nīhya).

Nishikawa left the band in March 2002 due to differences in musical direction. He was arrested in October that year on suspicion of assaulting his sister-in-law (the charges were later dropped), and a urine test resulted in an additional charge for using illegal stimulants. He stated that he began using them due to a lack of sleep, purchasing them after being approached by a dealer at a club in Tokyo. He was sentenced to 1 year 6 months, but the sentence was suspended for three years. He was arrested a second time, in February 2006 following a traffic stop in which police found stimulants in his vehicle. He was convicted and sentenced to 1 year 6 months, and he was released from prison in 2007.

In 2009, Nishikawa opened a bar in Sapporo, where he regularly hosts "Dre Night" (ドリナイト, Dori Naito) during which songs by Dreams Come True are played. He puts up posters in the bar each time a new Dreams Come True album is released. When concerts are held in Sapporo, the band often have an after party at the bar, and admission is a ticket from seeing the band perform. These events draw not only locals but also tourists. Nishikawa sometimes works as a DJ in Sapporo, and participates in LGBT events.

Nishikawa has stated that he has no intention of re-entering the public stage. Historical footage and images of Dreams Come True while he was a member are often manipulated to not show him. However, he remains close with the members of Dreams Come True, and band member Masato Nakamura is supportive of Nishikawa returning to the band. He made an appearance and performed with Nakamura in July 2019 as part of the band's 30th anniversary celebration, though Miwa Yoshida did not appear at this event.

Nishikawa has never been married.

== Awards ==
Year	Organization	Award title, Category	Work	Result	Refs	Notes
1995	The Television	The Television Drama Academy Award, Drama Theme Song	"Love Love Love"	Won		As part of Dreams Come True
1999	The Television	The Television Drama Academy Award, Drama Theme Song	"Morning Comes Again" (朝がまた来る, Asa ga Mata Kuru)	Won		As part of Dreams Come True

== See also ==
- Dreams Come True discography
- Miwa Yoshida
- Masato Nakamura
