= Mink (singer) =

Korean-born Japanese pop singer

- Born: February 15, 1984 (age 42); Incheon, South Korea
- Occupation: Singer
- Years active: 2005–2009
- Label: Rhythm Zone

Korean name
- Hangul: 이밍크
- RR: I Mingkeu
- MR: I Mingk'ŭ

Lee Mink (Korean: 이밍크; born February 15, 1984), better known as Mink (stylized in all lowercase) is a South Korean singer based in Japan. Mink debuted in Japan in 2005. In 2006, she became one of the first musical artists from South Korea to enter the U.S. Billboard charts, when her single "Glory of Life" reached number one on the Dance Club Songs chart.

== Career ==
Mink was born and raised in Korea before traveling to Japan to further her education. While in Japan, she submitted demo tracks of "Don't know why", "When You Believe", and "Namida Sousou" to Avex Trax, one of Japan's leading J-pop labels. She was signed with them soon after.

In August 2005, her debut album "mink" was released and received a good reception while featuring "Beautiful", a song used for the film Initial D: The Movie. The album also included covers of "I Can't Tell You Why", "Don't You Worry 'Bout a Thing", "Suki", and "More than Words". In October, Mink performed live in the "es sadaharu hoshino" Paris collection held in Paris, France.

In early 2006, her song "Glory of Life" from her debut album was released and licensed to Rhythm Zone/King Street Records and remixed by Chris Cox, John Creamer and Stephane K. This song hit the #1 position on the U.S. Billboard Hot Dance Club Play chart. This placed her alongside Kumi Koda ("Trust Your Love") and Hikaru Utada ("Devil Inside"). as one of the first Asian Artists to have a #1 single in the USA. In March, she participated in the "Winter Music Conference" in Miami, USA. She was ranked 8th in the 2006 USEN Japanese Music Total HIT Ranking.

To follow her American success, her second single, "4 Love," was originally scheduled to be co-released in the USA. However, it was later canceled and was only released in Japan. Mink's "Eternal Love" from that single was remixed and used for the film Chisaki Yusha Tachi Gamera. In December, her "Here by my side" was used as the theme song for the 3D animated short Joe and Marilyn, part of the omnibus film Amazing Nuts! produced by Studio 4°C. This song was later released on her third album, "Shalom".

In January 2007, Mink's "Innocent Blue -Chi Hate Umi Tsukiru Made-" was released as the theme song for the Japan-Mongol epic film, Aoki Ookami. Her song "Together Again" was used in "Vexil -2077 Nihon Sengoku" and released in August.

In March 2008, she received the "Film Music Artist Award" during the 17th Japan Film Critics Award.

== Discography ==
=== Studio albums ===
Title	Album details	Peak chart positions
Title	Album details	JPN
mink	Released: August 3, 2005; Label: Rhythm Zone; Format: CD, digital download	20
e+motion	Released: December 7, 2005; Label: Rhythm Zone; Format: CD, digital download	23
Shalom	Released: February 28, 2007; Label: Rhythm Zone; Format: CD, digital download	12

=== Other albums ===
Title	Album details
minkII ～endless love～	Extended play; Released: April 23, 2008; Label: Rhythm Zone; Format: CD, digital download
Best of My Love	Compilation album; Released: December 10, 2008; Label: Rhythm Zone; Format: CD, digital download

=== Singles ===
Title	Year	Peak chart positions		Album
Title	Year	JPN	US Dance Club	Album
"Omajinai" (おまじない)	2005	—	—	mink
"All My Life"	2005	—	—	mink
"Glory of Life" (栄光の花)	2005	—	—	mink
"Beautiful" / "One Suitcase"	2005	—	—	mink / e+motion (Note: "Beautiful" was included on mink, while "One Suitcase" was included on e+motion.)
"Glory of Life" (English version)	2006	—	1	mink
"4 Love"	2006	20	—	Shalom
"Hold On To a Dream"	2006	40	—	Shalom
"Innocent Blue"	2007	39	—	Shalom
"Together Again"	2007	—	—	Non-album singles
"Sense"	2007	—	—	Non-album singles
"—" Denotes releases that did not chart.

=== Other charted songs ===
Title	Year	Peak chart positions	Album
Title	Year	US Dance Club	Album
"Everlasting Love" (GTS feat. mink)	2006	10	Rhythm Paradise

== See also ==
- List of number-one dance hits (United States)
- List of artists who reached number one on the US Dance chart
