= Kessen wa Kinyōbi =

Single by Dreams Come True

from the album The Swinging Star
- Released: September 19, 1992
- Genre: Pop; Disco; City pop
- Length: 4:43
- Label: Epic/Sony Records
- Songwriters: Miwa Yoshida; Masato Nakamura
- Producers: Mike Pela; Dreams Come True

Dreams Come True singles chronology
"Wasurenaide" (1991)	"Kessen wa Kinyōbi" (1992)	"Haretara Ii ne" (1992)

Audio sample
- "Kessen wa Kinyōbi": file; help

"Kessen wa Kinyōbi" (決戦は金曜日; lit. "Friday Is the Crucial Day") is a song recorded by Japanese band Dreams Come True for their fifth studio album, The Swinging Star. It was released as the album's lead single by Epic/Sony Records on September 19, 1992. It served as the opening theme to the CX music show Ureshi Tanoshi Daisuki - Friday Night Live, on which the band were regular cast members. The single's coupling song, "Taiyō ga Miteru" was used in the advertising campaign for Fujifilm's Fujicolor Super HG 400 film.

== Composition ==
The lyrics to "Kessen wa Kinyōbi" were written by Miwa Yoshida and the song was composed and arranged by Masato Nakamura, while the track was co-produced by the band and Mike Pela. "Kessen wa Kinyōbi" came about when Nakamura and Sing Like Talking frontman Chikuzen Satō decided to challenge themselves to a friendly competition to see who could write the best song using the chord progression to Cheryl Lynn's "Got to Be Real" as base inspiration. "Kessen wa Kinyōbi" and "Rise" by Sing Like Talking, from their album Humanity (1992), were the resulting tracks. Additionally, Nakamura pulled inspiration from Earth, Wind & Fire's "Let's Groove" to make the perfect disco anthem. The song is written in the key of C minor with a common time tempo of 126 beats per minute. Yoshida's vocals span two octaves, from G_{3} to G_{5}.

== Critical reception ==
CDJournal critics described the song as a "fanfare" that gets your "adrenaline pumping". It was praised for capturing the essence of Lynn's "Got to Be Real", on which the song is based.

== Cover versions ==
In 2003, Key of life and A.mia sampled "Kessen wa Kinyōbi" on their song "Friday Let Me Down" featuring Soul'd Out's Diggy-Mo'. In 2012, Nico Touches the Walls recorded a cover of the song to be included as a B-side to the single "Yume 1 Go". In 2014, HY recorded a cover of the song for the Dreams Come True tribute album, Watashi no Dorikamu, released in celebration of the band's 25th anniversary. In 2017, Daichi Miura recorded his rendition of the song for the Dreams Come True cover album, DoriUta Vol. 1.

== Chart performance ==
"Kessen wa Kinyōbi" debuted at number one on the Oricon Singles Chart, with 210,970 copies sold in its first week. The single stayed at the top of the chart for three consecutive weeks, selling 136,300 copies on its second charting week and 86,690 copies on its third week. It slid to number three the following week, logging sales of 87,550 units. The single spent an additional three weeks in the top ten. It charted in the top 100 for twenty-three weeks, selling a reported total of 1,070,420 copies, making it Dreams Come True's first million-selling single. "Kessen wa Kinyōbi" ranked at number 18 on the year-end Oricon Singles Chart for 1992.

== Track listing ==
All lyrics are written by Miwa Yoshida.

No.	Title	Music	Arranger(s)	Length
1.	"Kessen wa Kinyōbi" (決戦は金曜日, "Friday Is the Crucial Day")	Masato Nakamura	Nakamura	4:43
2.	"Taiyō ga Miteru" (太陽が見てる, "The Sun Is Staring")	Nakamura	Nakamura	4:49
Total length:				9:32

== Charts ==
Chart (1992)	Peak position
Japan Weekly Singles (Oricon)	1
Japan Monthly Singles (Oricon)	3
Japan Yearly Singles (Oricon)	18

== Certifications and sales ==
Region	Certification	Certified units/sales
Japan (RIAJ)	Million	1,070,000
Streaming
Japan (RIAJ)	Platinum	100,000,000^{†}
^{†} Streaming-only figures based on certification alone.

== See also ==
- List of Oricon number-one singles
