= The Swinging Star =

Studio album by Dreams Come True
- Released: November 14, 1992
- Recorded: 1992
- Studio: Sony Music Shinanomachi Studio (Tokyo); Marine Studio (Kannonzaki); Air Studios (London); The Hit Factory (London)
- Genre: J-pop; new wave; city pop; soul; jazz fusion; funk; art pop; contemporary R&B
- Length: 53:53
- Label: Epic Records Japan
- Producer: Mike Pela; Dreams Come True

Dreams Come True chronology
Million Kisses (1991)	The Swinging Star (1992)	Magic (1993)

Singles from The Swinging Star
- 1. "Kessen wa Kinyōbi" Released: September 19, 1992; 2. "Haretara Ii ne" Released: October 21, 1992

The Swinging Star is the fifth studio album by Japanese band Dreams Come True. It was released on November 14, 1992, by Epic Records Japan. It was their first release in about a year since their previous album, Million Kisses (1991). All of the album's lyrics were solely penned by frontwoman Miwa Yoshida, while its songs were arranged by her bandmate Masato Nakamura. The Swinging Star is a doo-wop, pop, blue-eyed soul, and R&B record, with elements of jazz and disco music.

The Swinging Star received positive reviews from most music critics, whom praised the production and Yoshida's vocal performance. Commercially, the album was a huge success in Japan, ascending to number one on the Oricon Albums Chart. It was the fastest-selling album based on first week sales at the time, and sold over 3.2 million units in Japan, making it the 17th best-selling album in that region. The success of the album garnered Dreams Come True the Japan Record Award for "Best Album."

To promote the album the band released two singles. The album's lead single, "Kessen wa Kinyōbi," was released on September 19, 1992; it became a massive success, becoming their first million-selling single and becoming their second chart-topper on the Oricon Singles Chart. "Haretara Ii ne" was released as the second and final single on October 21, 1992; it also became a success, reaching number one and selling over 685,000 copies. To further promote this album, the band embarked on a concert tour called Dreams Come True Concert Tour The Swinging Star from January 28 to April 18, 1993.

== Background ==
The album's lead single, "Kessen wa Kinyōbi," was released on September 19, 1992. It served as the theme to the CX music show Ureshi Tanoshi Daisuki - Friday Night Live, on which the band were regular cast members. The single's coupling song, "Taiyō ga Miteru" was used in the advertising campaign for Fujifilm's Fujicolor Super HG 400 film. The single reached number one on the weekly Oricon Singles Chart and charted for 23 weeks, selling approximately 1,070,420 copies. Because it sold 856,870 copies in 1992, it finished as the 18th best-performing single of the year. It was their first single to sell over a million copies. "Haretara Ii ne" was released as the second and final single on October 21, 1992. It was the theme song for the NHK dorama series Hilari. The single reached number one on the Oricon Singles Chart, becoming the 48th best-selling single of 1992.

The track "Sweet Sweet Sweet" originated as the ending theme of the 1992 video game Sonic the Hedgehog 2, for which bassist Masato Nakamura composed the music. It would later be remixed by American rapper and producer Akon for Sonic the Hedgehog in 2006. The Swinging Star was recorded in Japan and the United Kingdom during 1992, and was mastered by Tim Young at The Hit Factory in London.

== Commercial performance ==
The Swinging Star was a massive commercial success throughout Asia. In Japan, the album debuted at the top of the Oricon Albums Chart with 1,209,920 copies sold in its first week. This made it the fastest-selling album in the history of the Japanese music industry at the time. It spent two consecutive weeks atop the chart, with 513,770 copies sold in its second week. The Swinging Star became the first album to sell three million copies in Japan, breaking the Japanese record for total CD album sales at the time. Since it was released on November 14 and the closing date of the Oricon Annual Chart at that time was the last week of November, sales in its first week of release and sales after that were spread out, and thus it was in the top five on the Oricon Annual Album Chart for two consecutive years. It was named the fifth most popular album of the year 1992, and the fourth most popular album of the year 1993. It was also the first time ever for an album to exceed the million-seller mark in more than one year, and the first case of a domestic album to do so.

According to Sony statistics, by January 20, 1993, shipments had topped 3.02 million copies. The Swinging Star stayed on the chart for 55 weeks, and was also once the biggest-selling Japanese-language album of all time. As of January 2015, it has sold over 3.2 million copies in Japan and has been certified triple million by the Recording Industry Association of Japan (RIAJ). (Note: Initially received a 8× Platinum certification for 3.2 million copies shipped, however the 8× Platinum threshold was retired in 2003.) To promote this album, the band embarked on a concert tour called Dreams Come True Concert Tour The Swinging Star from January 28 to April 18, 1993, attracting 250,000 spectators.

== Track list ==
All lyrics are written by Miwa Yoshida, and all tracks arranged by Masato Nakamura.

CD (ESCB 1350)
No.	Title	Music	Length
1.	"The Swinging Star"	Masato Nakamura	0:59
2.	"Ano Natsu no Hanabi" (あの夏の花火 "The Fireworks of That Summer")	M. Nakamura • Takahiro Nishikawa	4:48
3.	"Da Diddly Deet Dee"	M. Yoshida	4:04
4.	"Sayonara" (extended version)	M. Nakamura	6:01
5.	"Ikitai no wa Mountain Mountain" (行きたいのはMOUNTAIN MOUNTAIN)	M. Yoshida • M. Nakamura	3:38
6.	"Megane Goshi no Sora" (眼鏡越しの空)	M. Yoshida	3:57
7.	"Kessen wa Kinyōbi" (決戦は金曜日)	M. Nakamura	5:39
8.	"Namida to Tatakatteru" (涙とたたかってる)	M. Yoshida • M. Nakamura	5:38
9.	"Hide and Seek"	M. Yoshida	4:57
10.	"Taiyō ga Miteru" (太陽が見てる)	M. Nakamura	4:49
11.	"Sweet Sweet Sweet"	M. Nakamura	5:13
12.	"Haretara Ii ne" (晴れたらいいね)	M. Yoshida	4:06
Total length:			53:53

== Charts ==
=== Weekly charts ===
Chart (1992–1993)	Peak position
Japanese Albums (Oricon)	1

=== Year-end charts ===
Chart (1992)	Position
Japanese Albums (Oricon)	5

1993 year-end charts for The Swinging Star
Chart (1993)	Position
Japanese Albums (Oricon)	4

=== Decade-end charts ===
Chart (1990–1999)	Position
Japanese Albums (Oricon)	13

=== All-time chart ===
Chart	Position
Japanese Albums (Oricon)	17

== Certification and sales ==
Region	Certification	Certified units/sales
Japan (RIAJ)	8× Platinum	3,222,990
