= Fuzzy Control (band) =

Japanese rock band

- Origin: Okinawa Prefecture, Japan
- Genres: Alternative rock
- Years active: 2003–Present
- Labels: Victor (2003-2008); DCT Records (2009-)
- Members: Juon; Satoko; Joe
- Website: www.fuzzycontrol.jp

Fuzzy Control (ファジー コントロール, Fajī Kontorōru) is a three-piece Japanese rock band currently signed to DCT Records. They gained prominence in Japan after being featured as vocalists and musicians on Dreams Come True's singles "Good Bye My School Days" and "Sono Saki e". Fuzzy Control has played at the 2005 Summer Sonic Festival and their single "Think Twice" was used as the ending theme for the Mushiking: King of the Beetles anime. They also appeared at the 60th NHK Kōhaku Uta Gassen, having been featured on Dreams Come True's "Sono Saki e".

== Members ==
- Juon Kamata (鎌田 樹音, Kamata Juon, March 8, 1985): Vocals & guitar
- Satoko Suganuma (菅沼 知子, Suganuma Satoko, September 10, 1982): Drums & chorus
- Joe Hoshino (星野 譲, Hoshino Jō, August 5, 1981): Bass & chorus

== Discography ==
=== Albums ===
- Chicken - September 27, 2003
- First Control - July 21, 2004
- 2 "Twice" - August 24, 2005
- Fuzzy Control - May 19, 2007 (Re-released December 19, 2009)
- 4 Force - August 13, 2008
- 8 Single - August 13, 2008
- The Gig - September 29, 2010
- Super Family Control - October 19, 2011
- Rocks - September 4, 2013

=== Singles ===
- "Shine On" - June 21, 2003
- "Later" - May 24, 2004
- "Little Girl" - June 9, 2004
- "I'll Get the Freedom" - December 16, 2004
- "Think Twice" - November 16, 2005
- "1°C" (1°C（イチド）, Ichido, "One Degree") - March 8, 2006
- "Kodō" (鼓動, "Pulse") - July 26, 2007
- "A A Aiyaiya A A!" (あ・あ・あいやいや・あ・あ!) - June 21, 2009
- "Latest" - December 2, 2009
- "Sunset" - July 7, 2010
- "Sweet Rain Sweet Home" - July 13, 2011
- "Born to Be Wild" - February 8, 2012
- "Chō Hello Goodbye" (超ハローグッバイ, Chō Harō Gubbai) - October 1, 2012
- "Christmas Song" - November 1, 2012

=== Featured tracks ===
- "Good Bye My School Days" by Dreams Come True
  - Track 4: "Good Bye My School Days -Fajikon-kei-" (GOOD BYE MY SCHOOL DAYS -ファジコン系-, "FuzzyCon Style")
- "Sono Saki e" (その先へ, "Ahead") by Dreams Come True featuring Fuzzy Control
- "Lies, Lies." by Dreams Come True
  - Track 3: "Lies, Lies. -Guitar Version- feat. Juon from Fuzzy Control"
