= Pure Soul (album) =

Studio album by Glay
- Released: July 29, 1998
- Genre: Power pop, pop rock
- Length: 55:56
- Label: PolyGram; Mustard/Unlimited
- Producer: Masahide Sakuma; Glay

Glay chronology
Review (1997)	Pure Soul (1998)	Heavy Gauge (1999)

Singles from Pure Soul
- 1. "Yuuwaku" Released: April 29, 1998; 2. "Soul Love" Released: April 29, 1998

Pure Soul is the fifth released album from the Japanese rock band Glay. The album was a slight departure from the rock and power ballad sound the band sported with their previous albums. Pure Soul brought forth a faster alt-rock sound. The album contains such hits as "Yuuwaku", "Soul Love", the concert classic "I'm in Love", and the title track "Pure Soul". The album peaked at #1 on Oricon charts and sold about 2,430,000. It was certified "Triple million" by the Recording Industry Association of Japan (RIAJ).

== Track listing ==
1. You May Dream - 5:15
2. Biribiri Crashmen (ビリビリクラッシュメン) - 4:33
3. May Fair - 4:58
4. Soul Love - 4:30
5. Deatte Shimatta Futari (出会ってしまった２人) - 3:56
6. Pure Soul - 6:24
7. Yuuwaku (誘惑) - 4:16
8. Come On!! - 3:23
9. FriedChicken & Beer - 4:37
10. 3 Years Later (３年後) - 7:33
11. I'm in Love - 6:28
- All music and lyrics by Takuro, except for #2 (music by Jiro), all arrangements by Glay and Masahide Sakuma. Luna Sea guitarist Sugizo appears on #9 as a guest.

== Covers ==
"Yuuwaku" was covered by Hero on the compilation Crush! 2 -90's V-Rock Best Hit Cover Songs-, which was released on November 23, 2011 and features current visual kei bands covering songs from bands that were important to the 1990s visual kei movement. It was also covered by Fantôme Iris, a fictional visual kei band from multimedia franchise Argonavis from BanG Dream! on the franchise first omnibus mini album Gin no Yuri/Banzai Rizing!!!/Hikari no Akuma released on December 9, 2020.

== Album chart information ==
Oricon Top Ranking: #1
Weeks on: 41
Overall Glay Ranking: #3
(NOTE: Overall Glay Ranking is how it is ranked against Glay's other albums according to the Oricon)
