= Love Love Love (Dreams Come True song) =

Single by Dreams Come True

from the album Love Unlimited ∞
- Released: July 1995
- Genre: Baroque pop
- Length: 3:24
- Label: Epic/Sony Records
- Songwriters: Miwa Yoshida; Masato Nakamura
- Producers: Dreams Come True; Mike Pela

Dreams Come True singles chronology
"Thank You." (1995)	"Love Love Love" (1995)	"Romance" (1995)

"Love Love Love" (stylized as "LOVE LOVE LOVE") is a song recorded by Japanese band Dreams Come True for their eighth studio album, Love Unlimited ∞. It was released as the album's lead single by Epic/Sony Records in July 1995. It is the theme song to the TBS drama series Aishiteiru to Itte Kure. The single's B-side, "Arashi ga Kuru", was also featured throughout the series' twelve episodes. With over two million copies sold, "Love Love Love" is the tenth best-selling Japanese single of all time and remains the band's most successful single.

== Composition ==
"Love Love Love" was written by Miwa Yoshida and composed and arranged by Masato Nakamura, while the track was co-produced by the band and Mike Pela. Nakamura composed the song in his early twenties, before debuting with Dreams Come True, as a Valentine's Day present for his then-girlfriend. When the band received the offer to pen the soundtrack to Aishiteiru to Itte Kure, Nakamura and Yoshida re-wrote the song together with the series' protagonist in mind. The song is written in the key of D-flat major with a common time tempo of 84 beats per minute. Yoshida's vocals span from G♯_{3} to C♯_{5}.

== Critical reception ==
The song was praised for its "iconic" use of uilleann pipes and harpsichord in the intro, and for the "outstanding" surging mellow beat. CDJournal critics praised Yoshida for her clever lyrics. The song was noted by them for being strikingly reminiscent of The Beatles sound.

== Commercial tie-ins ==
An English version of the song, subsequently included on the compilation album, Love Overflows: Asian Edition (2004), was used in television ads for the Honda Odyssey in 2003. In 2016, the original version was used in the promotional campaign for the remodeled Subaru Impreza.

== Cover versions ==
In 1997, the Japanese band Circus were the first to record a cover version of "Love Love Love", included on their album Heart. In 2005, Hideaki Tokunaga recorded a version for his first cover album, Vocalist. In 2007, Japanese singer Yasushi Nakanishi recorded the second rendition of the song by a male vocalist for his cover album, Standards. That same year, singer Junko Ohashi recorded her own version for the album Terra. In 2009, Akira Fuse recorded a cover of "Love Love Love" for his album Ballade II. In the same year, New Zealand singer Hayley Westenra recorded an English version from this song for Japanese-themed album "Hayley Sings Japanese Songs 2". In 2010, Shin Seung Hun and Hiromi Iwasaki both recorded their own versions of the song for their albums, My Favorite and Dear Friends V, respectively. In 2012, Maya Sakura included a cover of "Love Love Love" on her album Maya Kara Karaoke Queen Sakura Maya to Utaō!!. In 2013, Tsuyoshi Domoto and Chris Hart recorded covers of the song for their respective albums Kaba and Heart Song. In 2014, Miwa recorded a cover of the song for the Dreams Come True tribute album, Watashi no Dorikamu, released in celebration of the band's 25th anniversary. In 2015, Tomomi Kahara recorded a cover of the song for her third cover album, Memories 3: Kahara Back to 1995. "Love Love Love" has also been covered in English by Eric Martin on his cover album Mr. Vocalist (2008), Cargo×Seira on the album Flower Shower (2010) and The United on the album, We Are The United (2013).

== Chart performance ==
"Love Love Love" debuted at number one on the Oricon Singles Chart, with 696,880 copies sold in its first week, marking the band's highest first-week sales ever. The single slid to number two the following week, selling 237,300 copies. It stayed at number two for the next two weeks, logging sales of 269,780 copies in its third charting week and 202,730 copies in its fourth week. The single charted in the top five for an additional seven weeks. "Love Love Love" was the best-selling single of 1995, topping the year-end Oricon Singles Chart with 2,351,940 copies sold within the year. The single charted in the top 100 for thirty-two weeks and sold a reported total of 2,488,630 copies during its chart run, making it the tenth best-selling single of all time in Japan.

== Track listing ==
All lyrics are written by Miwa Yoshida.

No.	Title	Music	Arranger(s)	Length
1.	"Love Love Love"	Masato Nakamura	Nakamura	3:24
2.	"Arashi ga Kuru" (嵐が来る, "The Storm Is Coming")	Nakamura	Nakamura	4:23
Total length:				8:02

== Charts ==
Chart (1995)	Peak position
Japan Weekly Singles (Oricon)	1
Japan Monthly Singles (Oricon)	1
Japan Yearly Singles (Oricon)	1

== Certification and sales ==
Region	Certification	Certified units/sales
Japan (RIAJ)	2× Million	2,489,000
Japan (RIAJ) Digital	Gold	100,000^{*}
Streaming
Japan (RIAJ)	Gold	50,000,000^{†}
^{*} Sales figures based on certification alone.^{†} Streaming-only figures based on certification alone.

== See also ==
- List of best-selling singles in Japan
- List of Oricon number-one singles
