= Dreams Come True The Ura Best! Watashi Dake no Dorikamu =

Greatest hits album by Dreams Come True
- Released: July 7, 2016
- Label: Universal Sigma

Dreams Come True chronology
Dreams Come True The Best! Watashi no Dorikamu (2015)	Dreams Come True The Ura Best! Watashi Dake no Dorikamu (2016)	The Dream Quest (2017)

Dreams Come True The Ura Best! Watashi Dake no Dorikamu (DREAMS COME TRUE THE ウラBEST! 私だけのドリカム) is a greatest hits album by Japanese pop band Dreams Come True. It was released on July 7, 2016. It was number-one on the Oricon weekly Albums Chart on its release, with 108,797 copies sold. It was the third best-selling album in Japan in July 2016, with 162,968 copies sold. It was also number-one on the Billboard Japan Top Album Sales chart and number-two on the Billboard Japan Hot Albums chart.

== Track listing ==
Disc 1
No.	Title	Length
1.	"雪のクリスマス -VERSION ’16-"
2.	"7月7日、晴れ"
3.	"go for it!"
4.	"うれしはずかし朝帰り"
5.	"薬指の決心"
6.	"a little waltz"
7.	"LOVE GOES ON…"
8.	"あはは"
9.	"MY TIME TO SHINE"
10.	"銀河への船"
11.	"いろんな気持ち"
12.	"いつのまに"
13.	"ラヴレター"
14.	"愛して笑ってうれしくて涙して"
15.	"よろこびのうた"
16.	"夢で逢ってるから"
17.	"大っきらい でもありがと"

Disc 2
No.	Title	Length
1.	"POISON CENTRAL"
2.	"TO THE BEAT, NOT TO THE BEAT"
3.	"NOCTURNE 001"
4.	"2人のDIFFERENCE"
5.	"Goodbye, Darlin’"
6.	"ANOTHER JUNK IN MY TRUNK"
7.	"みつばち"
8.	"TORIDGE & LISBAH"
9.	"どうぞよろしく"
10.	"カノン"
11.	"高く上がれ!"
12.	"月光"
13.	"SPOON ME, BABY ME"
14.	"4月の雨"
15.	"そうだよ"
16.	"しあわせなからだ -VERSION ’16-"
17.	"おやすみのうた"

Disc 3
No.	Title	Length
1.	"LOVETIDE"
2.	"SWEET REVENGE"
3.	"IT'S SO DELICIOUS"
4.	"さよならを待ってる"
5.	"ESCAPE"
6.	"i think you do"
7.	"flowers"
8.	"週に1度の恋人 -VERSION ’16-"
9.	"雨の終わる場所"
10.	"嵐が来る"
11.	"ROMANCE"
12.	"なんて恋したんだろ"
13.	"SWEET SWEET SWEET / SWEET DREAMS (JAPANESE VER.)"
14.	"MARRY ME?"
15.	"CARNAVAL ～すべての戦う人たちへ～ -SINGLE VERSION-"
16.	"PROUD OF YOU"

== Charts ==
Chart (2016)	Peak position
Japan Oricon weekly Albums Chart	1
Japan Billboard Japan weekly Hot Albums chart	2
Japan Billboard Japan weekly Top Album Sales chart	1
