= Do You Dreams Come True? =

Studio album by Dreams Come True
- Released: March 21, 2009
- Recorded: 2008
- Genre: J-pop
- Length: 54:11
- Label: Nayutawave Records

Dreams Come True chronology
And I Love You (2007)	Do You Dreams Come True? (2009)	Love Central (2010)

Alternative covers
- Greatest Hits "The Soul 2" sleeve

Alternative cover
- "Winter Fantasia 2008" sleeve

Singles from Do You Dreams Come True?
- 1. "Merry-Life-Goes-Round/True, Baby True." Released: June 25, 2008; 2. "Tsuretette Tsuretette" Released: November 12, 2008; 3. "Good Bye My School Days" Released: February 25, 2009

Professional ratings
Review scores
Source	Rating
Allmusic	4/5 stars

Do You Dreams Come True? is Dreams Come True's fifteenth studio album. It was released on March 21, 2009, which coincides with the release of their debut single in 1989. It was released in three formats: Regular edition (CD only), limited edition A (2CDs) and limited edition B (CD+DVD). The album reached the top spot on the weekly albums chart despite having been on sale for only four days, giving them their twelfth number-one album and setting the record for most number-one albums by a female vocal group; putting them ahead of the late Zard and Every Little Thing. On its third week the album rose back to number one, their first album in fourteen years to do so.

The album was certified Triple Platinum for shipment of 750,000 copies. It is also the first DCT album to be released under Nayutawave Records, a sub-label of Universal Music Japan.

== Track list ==
CD: "Do You Dreams Come True?"
No.	Title	Length
1.	"A Song for You: Opening Theme of dydct?"	1:27
2.	"Merry-Life-Goes-Round"	4:03
3.	"Tsuretette Tsuretette (連れてって 連れてって, Take Me Take Me)"	5:13
4.	"To The Beat, Not to The Beat"	4:26
5.	"Ā Mō!! (あぁもう！！, Ah, Enough!!)"	3:47
6.	"Daikkirai Demo Arigato (大っきらい でもありがと, I Hate You But Thanks)"	5:45
7.	"Sayonara Mētā / Tameiki Kauntā (サヨナラメーター／タメイキカウンター, Goodbye Meter / Sigh Counter)"	4:43
8.	"True, Baby True. (Extended Version)"	6:15
9.	"Middle of Nowhere"	4:10
10.	"Almost Home"	5:54
11.	"Good Bye My School Days"	4:39
12.	"A Love Song"	3:49

CD: "Greatest Hits 'The Soul 2'"
No.	Title	Length
1.	"Nando Demo (何度でも, No Matter How Many Times)"	3:49
2.	"Kimi ni Shika Kikoenai (きみにしか聞こえない, Only You Can Hear It)"	3:58
3.	"Osaka Lover (大阪LOVER, Osaka Lover)"	4:25
4.	"Masukara Matsuge (マスカラまつげ, Mascara Eyelashes)"	4:14
5.	"Snow Dance"	4:27
6.	"Hajimari no La (はじまりのla, The First La)"	4:11
7.	"Itsu no Ma ni (いつのまに, Before You Know It)"	3:32
8.	"JET!!!"	4:35
9.	"Ai-shi-te-ru no Sain: Watashitachi no Mirai Yosouzu (ア・イ・シ・テ・ルのサイン ～わたしたちの未来予想図～, Signs of I-Love-You: A Picture of Our Future)"	5:37
10.	"Suki Dake Jya Dame Nanda (好きだけじゃだめなんだ, Loving You Is Not Enough)"	4:16
11.	"Moshimo Yuki Nara (もしも雪なら, If It Were To Snow)"	5:12
12.	"Yasashii Kisu o Shite (やさしいキスをして, Kiss Me Softly)"	3:40
13.	"Proud of You"	4:30
14.	"Sora o Yomu (空を読む, Read The Sky)"	3:34
15.	"Mirai Yosouzu II: Version '07 (未来予想図II ～VERSION '07～, A Picture of Our Future: Version '07)"	7:08
16.	"Winter Song: Dancing Snowflakes Version"	5:51
17.	"Love Love Love: English Version"	4:16

DVD: "Winter Fantasia 2008"
No.	Title	Length
1.	"初雪: Ending Theme"
2.	"サンタと天使が笑う夜"
3.	"SNOW DANCE"
4.	"LAT.43°N: Forty-Three Degrees North Latitude"
5.	"プライドなんて知らない"
6.	"雪よ! 大地よ! ファンピーよ!!"
7.	"Street Life"
8.	"ラヴレター"
9.	"おやすみのうた"
10.	"カノン"
11.	"Carnaval: すべての戦う人たちへ"
12.	"Middle of Nowhere"
13.	"連れてって 連れてって"
14.	"冬三昧にはまだ遠い"
15.	"Winter Song: Dancing Snowflakes Version"
16.	"Love Love Love"

== Charts ==
=== Oricon Sales Chart ===
Release	Chart	Peak Position	First Week Sales	Sales Total	Chart Run
March 21, 2009	Oricon Daily Charts	1			
March 21, 2009	Oricon Weekly Charts	1	231,496	667,037	35 weeks
March 21, 2009	Oricon Monthly Charts	2			
March 21, 2009	Oricon Yearly Charts	7		668,097	

=== Physical Sales & Rank ===
Chart	Peak position
Oricon Daily Albums Chart	1
Oricon Weekly Albums Chart	1
Oricon Monthly Albums Chart	2
Billboard Japan TOP Albums	1
G-Music Combo Chart (Taiwan)	18
G-Music J-POP Chart (Taiwan)	6
Soundscan Albums Chart (CD-Only)	1
