= The Love Rocks =

Studio album by Dreams Come True
- Released: February 22, 2006
- Recorded: 2005
- Genre: J-Pop
- Length: 56:19
- Label: Universal Music Japan; DCT records
- Producer: Dreams Come True

Dreams Come True chronology
Diamond 15 (2004)	The Love Rocks (2006)	And I Love You (2007)

The Love Rocks is Dreams Come True's 16th album, released on February 22, 2006.

== Track listing ==
1. Ai ga ROCK suru Teema [愛がROCKするテーマ]
2. PROUD OF YOU
3. Mata "tsurai" ga 1UP [また「つらい」が1UP]
4. Memai [めまい]
5. JET!!! ~album version~
6. Aishuu no GI Joe [哀愁のGIジョー]
7. SUNSHINE ~album version~
8. Teiuka [ていうか]
9. WIFEHOOD Sute oku densetsu PART1 ~Shufu no Sei Tsuma no Sei~ [WIFEHOOD ステ奥伝説 PART1 ～主婦の精 妻の精～]
10. Uso ni Kimatteru [ウソにきまってる]
11. Sora wo yomu [空を読む] ~album version~
12. Nandodemo [何度でも] ~album version~
13. SPOON ME, BABY ME
