= Delicious (Dreams Come True album) =

Studio album by Dreams Come True
- Released: March 25, 1995
- Recorded: 1994–1995
- Genres: J-pop; R&B
- Length: 49:14
- Label: Epic Records Japan
- Producers: Mike Pela; Dreams Come True

Dreams Come True chronology
Magic (1993)	Delicious (1995)	Love Unlimited (1996)

Singles from Delicious
- 1. "Suki" Released: November 4, 1994; 2. "Thank You." Released: February 22, 1995

Delicious is the seventh original studio album released by Japanese pop band Dreams Come True. It was distributed in Japan and across Asia on March 25, 1995, through Epic Records Japan. The record was released 1 year and 3 months after their previous album Magic. This is the first time that Dreams Come True, who have been releasing albums at a pace of one a year, have released an album that came out more than a full year after its predecessor. Delicious was also their first original album with 13 songs. The MiniDisc edition of the album was released on March 18, 1995, one week in advance of the CD and cassette edition. Delicious is primarily a pop record with influences of funk, R&B and tango.

Commercially, Delicious experienced huge success in Japan, reaching number one on the Oricon Albums Chart and charted for forty-five weeks. It has since been certified Double Million by the Recording Industry Association of Japan for shipments exceeding two million copies in the country. The record also became Japan's best-selling album of 1995 according to Oricon. Delicious is the 22nd highest-selling Japanese album of all time.

== Background ==
On December 4, 1993, Dreams Come True released their sixth studio album, Magic. It was a stratospheric commercial success in Japan, selling more than 2.5 million units. Following the release of Magic, the band deliberately slowed down their album-production pace and focused on English-language songs and collaborations with outside artists, with an eye toward expanding their presence overseas. The band made a series of moves aimed at reaching an international audience, including “Winter Song,” which was featured in the film Sleepless in Seattle, and “Eternity,” the ending theme for the animated film The Swan Princess. They produced “Wherever You Are,” featuring Maurice White of Earth, Wind & Fire as a guest. This experience eventually led to the Japanese version included on the album, “Itsumo Itsumo ~WHEREVER YOU ARE ‘DELICIOUS’ VERSION~”.

== Singles ==
In November 1994, the band released their sixteenth single, "Suki". It provided the then-trio with their seventh number one on the Oricon Singles Chart, and remained on the chart for 16 weeks. Success of the single led the band to perform it at the 45th NHK Kōhaku Uta Gassen alongside their hit "Winter Song". The song "Suki" has since been covered by prolific musicians such as Crystal Kay, Gackt and Juju.

Their follow-up single, "Thank You.", was released in February 1995. At the time "Thank You." was produced, the song was not scheduled to be released yet as a standalone commercial single. But in response to the Great Hanshin earthquake that occurred in January 1995, it was urgently released as a charity single the following month, with the royalties being used for donations and material aid. Despite selling over 1,069,000 copies, the single stalled at the runner-up spot on the Oricon Singles Chart. This was because the number one spot that week was occupied by Maki Oguro's "La La La." No music video has been produced for the song. It has been performed on various occasions and is a fan favorite, yet no promotional video was ever aired for "Thank You." despite there being one for "Suki".

== Reception ==
Supported by two highly successful singles, Delicious ascended to number one on the Oricon Albums Chart with 868,590 units sold in its first week. On the 1995 year-end ranking published by Oricon, it was listed as the top-selling album of that year with sales of 2.9 million copies. Since their 1991 album Million Kisses, the group had released four sequential works that have shipped over two million units. Their preceding album Magic had topped the 1994 Year End Oricon Albums Chart the previous year, making the group have two albums back-to-back to nab the top spot of the Oricon Yearly Albums Chart. Delicious is the band's second best selling LP according to Oricon Style. It is also the seventeenth best-selling album in Japan for the 1990s decade.

Until 1994, the group had announced their goal of "one album, one tour". But in 1995 there was no concert tour to accompany Delicious. Instead, the greatest hits live concert "Dreams Come True Wonderland '95" was held. Marking the group's first outdoor live tour, it took place in five cities: Hokkaido, Tokyo, Nagoya, Osaka, and Fukuoka, and attracted 500,000 people, the largest audience for the group to date. Since then, they have kept their tradition of holding quadrennial "Dreams Come True Wonderland" concerts to this very day, with the setlists being based on song requests from their fan base.

== Track listing ==
1. "Weather Forecast" – 1:18
2. "Itsumo Itsudemo" (いつも いつでも; Wherever You Are Delicious Version) – 4:17
3. "Kizuiteyo" (きづいてよ) – 4:26
4. "Toridge & Lisbah" – 3:06
5. "I Think You Do" – 4:31
6. "Suki" (すき; album version) – 3:37
7. "The Signs of Love" (Eternity Delicious Version) – 4:37
8. "Chinbotsusen no Monkey Girl" (沈没船のモンキーガール) – 2:29
9. "Takaga Koi no Ai" (たかが恋や愛) – 4:31
10. "Kohaku no Tsuki" (琥珀の月) – 4:08
11. "It's So Delicious" – 4:20
12. "Thank You" (サンキュ.) – 3:43
13. "Oyasumi no Uta" (おやすみのうた) – 4:01

== Charts and sales ==
=== Weekly charts ===
Chart (1995)	Peak position
Japanese Albums (Oricon)	1

=== Year-end charts ===
Chart (1995)	Peak position
Japanese Albums (Oricon)	1

=== Decade-end charts ===
Chart (1990–1999)	Position
Japanese Albums (Oricon)	17

=== All-time chart ===
Chart	Peak position
Japanese Albums (Oricon)	22

== Sales and certifications ==
Region	Certification	Certified units/sales
Japan (RIAJ)	2× Million	2,966,000
