= Love Goes On (Dreams Come True album) =

Love Goes On...

Studio album by Dreams Come True (band)
- Released: November 22, 1989
- Recorded: 1988–1989
- Genres: J-pop; jazz rock; contemporary R&B; synth funk; new wave
- Label: Epic/Sony Records
- Producers: Mike Pela; The Dreams Come True Band

Dreams Come True (band) chronology
| Dreams Come True (1989) | Love Goes On... (1989) | Wonder 3 (1990) |

Love Goes On... is the 1989 second album of Japanese band Dreams Come True. The album peaked at No. 8 on the Japan album chart selling 1,508,000 copies during its chart run.

== Track listing ==
with approximate translations

1. Ureshī! Tanoshī! Daisuki (うれしい!たのしい!大好き! happy! enjoy it! I like it!)
2. Ureshi-hazukashi asagaeri (うれしはずかし朝帰り Happy Walk of Shame)
3. Bigmouth no gyakushū (BIG MOUTHの逆襲)
4. Medicine
5. Lat.43°N (forty-three degrees north latitude)
6. Jibun gattena yoru (自分勝手な夜 selfish night)
7. Hoshizora ga utsuru umi (星空が映る海 sea reflects the starry sky)
8. Santa to tenshi ga warau yoru (サンタと天使が笑う夜 "The night Santa and the angel laughed")
9. Love Goes On...
10. Mirai yoso zu II (未来予想図II "Prospective view of the future II")
