= Masato Nakamura =

Japanese musician (born 1958)

- Born: October 1, 1958 (age 67); Chōfu, Japan
- Genres: J-pop; electropop; jazz; city pop; chiptune; video game music
- Occupations: Bassist; composer; record producer
- Instrument: Bass guitar
- Years active: 1988–present
- Labels: Universal Music Japan, Universal Republic Records
- Member of: Dreams Come True
- Website: blog.dctgarden.com

Masato Nakamura (中村 正人, Nakamura Masato; born October 1, 1958) is a Japanese musician, bass guitarist, and record producer. He is a member of the J-pop band Dreams Come True, which was formed in 1988 and went on to sell over 50 million CDs. He also composed the soundtracks for the video games Sonic the Hedgehog (1991) and Sonic the Hedgehog 2 (1992).

== Career ==
Nakamura was originally a session musician before forming the "Cha-Cha & Audrey's Project" with Miwa Yoshida. In 1988, they formed the band Dreams Come True along with keyboardist Takahiro Nishikawa. In July 2002, he founded the record company "DCT Records" with Yoshida. They now serve as executive producers. Nakamura composes much of the catalog for Dreams Come True and arranges almost all of it.

On June 22, 2008, he married Mākii, the 20-year-old former lead vocalist of the Japanese rock band, High and Mighty Color.

=== Sonic the Hedgehog ===
Nakamura was picked by Sega to compose the music for the original Sonic the Hedgehog early in 1990. Later that year on 7 November, the game was revealed for the first time by being painted on the side of Dream Come True's tour bus. He was also in the middle of recording the band's fourth album, Million Kisses during Sonic the Hedgehog, and their fifth album, The Swinging Star during Sonic the Hedgehog 2.

In 2006, Nakamura contributed a remixed version of the ending theme from Sonic the Hedgehog 2, "Sweet Sweet Sweet", for the 2006 game Sonic the Hedgehog.

In 2022, Nakamura voiced the Siberian champion in the Japanese dub of the Sonic the Hedgehog 2 film.
