= Miwa Yoshida =

Japanese singer

Miwa Yoshida 吉田 美和
- Born: 6 May 1965 (age 61); Ikeda, Hokkaido, Japan
- Genres: Pop, new wave, jazz, R&B
- Occupation: Singer-songwriter
- Instruments: Vocals
- Years active: 1988–present
- Labels: Universal Music Japan (as Dreams Come True), DCT records (solo), Toshiba EMI (Funk The Peanuts)
- Member of: Dreams Come True; Funk The Peanuts
- Website: dreamscometrue.com/miwayoshida/discography

Miwa Yoshida (吉田 美和, Yoshida Miwa; born 6 May 1965 in Ikeda, Hokkaido) is a Japanese musician, and the lead singer for the band Dreams Come True. She is also a founding member with bassist Masato Nakamura and keyboardist Takahiro Nishikawa.

Yoshida also fronts a Dreams Come True side-project, Funk the Peanuts, and has released two solo albums, Beauty and Harmony and Beauty and Harmony 2. Both albums took their name from the English translation of the name Miwa.

== Life and music career ==
In 2004, Yoshida married videographer Ken Sueda, who had shot several of Dreams Come True's Wonderland concert videos. Sueda died in 2007 of brain cancer, and it came out at the time that the marriage was never officially recorded.

In March 2012, she announced that she had married Juon Kamata, the lead singer of the Japanese rock band Fuzzy Control.

== Discography ==
=== Singles ===
- Namida no Mangekyō (涙の万華鏡, Kaleidoscope of Tears) -m.yo mix- (6 May 2003)
- Eternity (Swan Princess Soundtrack)

=== Albums ===
- Beauty and Harmony (18 December 1995)
- Beauty and Harmony 2 (6 May 2003)
