= Dreams Come True (band) =

Japanese pop band

- Origin: Japan
- Genres: J-pop; R&B; new wave; city pop
- Years active: 1988–present
- Labels: Epic/Sony; Virgin; Universal J; Nayutawave; Universal Sigma; DCT
- Members: Masato Nakamura; Miwa Yoshida
- Past members: Takahiro Nishikawa
- Website: dreamscometrue.com

Dreams Come True (Japanese: ドリームズ・カム・トゥルー, Hepburn: Dorīmuzu Kamu Turū) is a Japanese pop band formed in 1988 by Miwa Yoshida (lead vocals), Masato Nakamura (bass) and Takahiro Nishikawa (keyboards). Nishikawa left in 2002 to pursue a solo career.

Dreams Come True has sold more than 50 million records worldwide. Their fifth album, The Swinging Star (1992), was the first Japanese album to sell more than three million copies, and for several years was the highest-selling Japanese-language album of all time.

Nakamura composed the music for the Sega Mega Drive games Sonic the Hedgehog (1991) and Sonic the Hedgehog 2 (1992). In 1998, Dreams Come True released the English-language album Sing or Die, which was a commercial failure in the west.

== History ==
=== Debut and first years ===
Dreams Come True was formed in 1988 by Miwa Yoshida (lead vocals), Masato Nakamura (bass) and Takahiro Nishikawa (keyboards). The band is commonly known as DCT and sometimes referred to as "Dorikamu" (ドリカム). Their first album, Dreams Come True, sold more than one million copies in Japan. Their fifth, The Swinging Star (1992), was the first Japanese album to sell over three million copies, and for several years was the best-selling Japanese-language album of all time.

Nakamura composed the music for the Sega Mega Drive games Sonic the Hedgehog (1991) and Sonic the Hedgehog 2 (1992); the latter featured the band's song "Sweet Sweet Sweet" from The Swinging Star as its closing theme. In 1993, Dreams Come True recorded "Winter Song" for the opening theme of the Japanese version of the film Sleepless in Seattle and the following year recorded the song "Eternity" for the animated film The Swan Princess by New Line Cinema. In Japan, they recorded theme songs for programs produced by Tokyo Broadcasting System.

Yoshida started a solo music career in 1995, and the following year appeared on the cover of Time. She also appeared in advertisements for Sony, Visa, Honda, Shiseido, Lotte, Vodafone, and Coca-Cola. Nakamura was hired to compose the music for several television commercials, and around the same time compiled Dreams Come True songs for Konami to be used in the video game Dancing Stage featuring Dreams Come True.

=== Sing or Die ===
On April 1, 1996, Dreams Come True released Love Unlimited, their final album for Sony Music. News of their departure caused Sony Music shares to drop severely on the Tokyo Stock Exchange. In 1997, they signed with Virgin Music America and Toshiba-EMI in Japan and attempted to break into the American market. Their first album with Virgin, Sing or Die, was released in English in 1998. Yoshida took the stage name "Miwa" and Nakamura became "King Masa", but Nishikawa remained the same, and only received a passing mention on Sing or Die's liner notes.

Sing or Die was a commercial failure. According to The New York Times, the "brand of bright, uptempo pop just didn't hit the right chord with American listeners". In The Washington Post, Mark Jenkins wrote that Sing or Die was "global pop in the worst sense ... this is music that aspires to the depth of advertising jingles". Natalie Nichols of the Los Angeles Times wrote that the songs in the album "displayed a surprising lack of memorable hooks, however, and never quite overcame a vague sense of prefabrication".

Following 2001's Monkey Girl Odyssey, Dreams Come True left Virgin and Toshiba-EMI, and set up an independent label, DCT Records. It was the last work to credit Nishikawa.

=== Collaborations with Disney ===
In 2001, the band performed "Crystal Vine", the theme song for the Japanese version of Atlantis: The Lost Empire, and Yoshida performed the dub of Audrey Rocio Ramirez. They performed the song "Itoshi no Riley" for the film Inside Out (2015), originally thought as a separate song, but becoming its Japanese theme song.

=== Nishikawa's departure and return to major labels ===
Nishikawa departed in 2002 to pursue a solo career. Following his departure, he was arrested for assault and drug possession and received a suspended sentence. After a second arrest for possession in 2006, he was sentenced to prison.

Dreams Come True joined Universal Music Japan in 2003. They released one more English-language album on Universal called Love Overflows in 2004, which were re-recorded versions of songs from Love Goes On to Monkey Girl Odyssey. Albums such as The Love Rocks (2006) and And I Love You (2007) returned to the classic Dreams Come True sound.

=== 2008: 20th anniversary ===
On November 12, 2008, Dreams Come True released the single "Tsuretette Tsuretette". It debuted a top on the Oricon weekly charts, nine years ten months after their last number-one single, "Asa ga Mata Kuru". The song also appears on the album Do You Dreams Come True?. The album is available in three versions: A single disc version, containing the main album; a second that adds Greatest Hits: The Soul 2, a sequel to their 2000 greatest-hits package; and a third that adds a live DVD, "Winter Fantasia 2008." Their DVD and Blu-ray of their 20th Anniversary tour is one of the first concert videos to be filmed with the "Red One" high-definition camera.

=== 2010 – present ===
In 2010, they released their download only single "Godspeed", where the title is meant to be an even stronger wish of "Good Luck" for everyone to listen to it. In November, they released their 23rd album, Love Central, their second on Universal Music Japan's Nayutawave label. Their song "Itoshi no Riley" is the Japanese theme song of Inside Out. The music video is sandwiched in between the Lava short and the actual film itself on the theatrical release. In 2016, Dreams Come True released their first complete greatest hits album, Dreams Come True The Ura Best! Watashi Dake no Dorikamu.

In the tour event that the group celebrates around every 4 years, "Dreams Come True Wonderland", for the 2019 event, Nishikawa appeared as a surprise guest. Nakamura often visits Nishikawa at the bar he runs in Hokkaido, where he works as a DJ.

In September 2021, Dreams Come True released the single "Tsugi no Se~no! De - On the Green Hill", a new version of Nakamura's theme for Green Hill Zone from Sonic the Hedgehog. On July 2, 2025 it was announced that the group would be create the theme song for TV Asahi's drama The Big Chase: Tokyo SSBC Files, titled "Beacon".

== Charity events and participation ==
DCT has been involved in charity events, including the collaboration work "Zero Landmine" with Ryuichi Sakamoto in 2001 to help raise funds for land mine removal agencies, and taking part in the Live 8 benefit concert in 2005.

== Reception ==
In a 2006 survey of people between 10 and 49 years of age in Japan, Oricon Style found the number-one selling song "Love Love Love" (2,488,630 copies) the second most popular Valentine's Day song in Japan. The most popular song was Sayuri Kokushō's 1986 debut single "Valentine Kiss", which sold only 317,000 copies. The other songs in the top five were "Valentine's Radio" from Yumi Matsutoya (1,606,780 copies), "Happy Happy Greeting" from Kinki Kids (608,790 copies), and "My Funny Valentine" by Miles Davis.

== Band members ==
Current members

- Miwa Yoshida – vocal, songwriter
- Masato Nakamura – bass guitar, composer, record producer

Former members

- Takahiro Nishikawa – keyboards, synthesizer programmer (1988–2002)

== Discography ==
=== Studio albums ===
- Dreams Come True (1989)
- Love Goes On... (1989)
- Wonder 3 (1990)
- Million Kisses (1991)
- The Swinging Star (1992)
- Magic (1993)
- Delicious (1995)
- Love Unlimited∞ (1996)
- Sing or Die (1997)
- The Monster (1999)
- Monkey Girl Odyssey (2001)
- Diamond 15 (2004)
- The Love Rocks (2006)
- And I Love You (2007)
- Do You Dreams Come True? (2009)
- Love Central (2010)
- Attack 25 (2014)
- The Dream Quest (2017)
- The Black Album (2026)

== See also ==
- List of best-selling music artists in Japan
