= List of works by Shunji Iwai =

Wikimedia list article

A list of works by Shunji Iwai in film, TV & literature.

== Filmography ==
Year	Title	Director	Writer	Producer	Editor	Composer	Notes
1995	Love Letter	Yes	Yes	No	Yes	No	
1996	Picnic	Yes	Yes	No	No	No	
1996	Arcri	No	Story	No	No	No	
1996	Swallowtail Butterfly	Yes	Yes	No	Yes	No	
1998	April Story	Yes	Yes	No	Yes	Yes	
2001	All About Lily Chou-Chou	Yes	Yes	No	Yes	No	
2004	Hana & Alice	Yes	Yes	Yes	Yes	Yes	Based on his short-film series of the same title
2006	Rainbow Song	No	Yes (Note: Credited as Aminosan)	Yes	No	No	
2009	Halfway	No	No	Yes	Yes	No	Also executive producer
2009	Baton	No	Yes	Yes	No	No	
2010	Bandage	No	Yes	Yes	No	No	
2011	Vampire	Yes	Yes	Yes	Yes	Yes	Also cinematographer
2012	I Have to Buy New Shoes	No	No	Yes	Yes	No	Also director of photography and executive producer
2013	Far Away, So Close	No	No	No	No	Yes	
2015	The Case of Hana & Alice	Yes	Yes	Yes	Yes	Yes	Animated prequel of Hana and Alice
2016	A Bride for Rip Van Winkle	Yes	Yes	Yes	Yes	No	Also based on his novel
2018	Last Letter	Yes	Yes	Yes	Yes	Yes	Chinese adaptation of his novel Also executive producer
2020	Last Letter	Yes	Yes	Co-producer	Yes	No	Japanese adaptation of his novel
2020	The 12 Day Tale of the Monster that Died in 8	Yes	Yes	No	Yes	No	Also cinematographer, monster design and musical producer
2023	Kyrie	Yes	Yes	No	Yes	No	Also based on his novel

=== Acting roles ===
- M.B. Movie (1987)
- Shiki-Jitsu (2000), main role as "The Director"
- Ribbon (2021)
- From the End of the World (2023)

=== Executive producer ===
- Cities in Love (2015)

=== Short film ===
Year	Title	Director	Writer	Editor	Composer	Notes
1994	Undo	Yes	Yes	No	No	
1996	Knit Cap Man	Yes	Yes	No	No	Short music videoclip to commemorate the 20th Anniversary of the band Moonriders
1998	Ikieta Nobunanga	Yes	Yes	No	No	Short film within his film April Story
2002	ARITA	Yes	Yes	Yes	Yes	Segment of Jam Films
2008	Segment 3	Yes	Yes	Yes	Yes	Segment of the anthology film New York, I Love You

==== Early independent films ====
Year	Title
1982	Kajitshuo
1982	Yubari Sonata
1982	Requiem
1982	White Country, Summer Country
1984	Lemu (Rainy Day Labrinth)
1986	Mina's Legend
1986	Hana
1987	Buro Popins Pocky Poppins
1987	Indy Poppins Candy Poppins

=== Documentaries ===
Year	Title	Director	Writer	Editor	Notes
1999	Fireworks, Should We See It from the Side or the Bottom?	Yes	Yes	No	Making-of documentary of his short film Fireworks (1993)
2002	Triumphal March and 30 Days of Their Own	Yes	No	Yes	Documentary about the Japan national football team for Japan Football Association; Also producer
2002	All About "All About Lily Chou-Chou"	Yes	No	No	Making-of documentary of his film All About Lily Chou-Chou
2006	The Kon Ichikawa Story	Yes	Yes	Yes	Documentary about Kon Ichikawa on the making of his last film The Inugamis; Also composer

==== Making-of appearances ====
- YEN TOWN (1996)
- Once Upon a Time Returning to my Hometown (2000)
- All About "All About Lily Chou-Chou" (2001)
- Filming Hana & Alice (2004)
- Anno-San and Our Reckless Challenge: Japan Animator Expo (2015)

== Television ==
Year	Title	Director	Writer	Editor	Notes
1988	Miko Morikahua: The Document	Yes	No	No	TV Documentary Special
1989	Idol Aquarium	Yes	No	No	TV Special
1990	What is Bunchin Story?	Yes	No	No	TV Documentary Special
1990	Seikimatsu Utahime Aquarium	Yes	No	No	TV Special
1991	Unknown Child	Yes	Yes	No	TV horror drama for Kansai TV's DRAMA DOS; available on Initial: the Shunji Iwai Collection DVD
1991	The Man Who Came to Kill	Yes	Yes	No	available on Initial: the Shunji Iwai Collection DVD
1992	Ghost Soup	Yes	Yes	Yes	available on Initial: the Shunji Iwai Collection DVD
1992	Maria	Yes	Yes	No	TV drama; available on Initial: the Shunji Iwai Collection DVD
1992	A Tin of Crab Meat	Yes	Yes	No	Fuji TV's third series of Tales of the Unusual; available on Initial: the Shunji Iwai Collection DVD
1992	A Summer Solstice Story	Yes	Yes	Yes	available on Initial: the Shunji Iwai Collection DVD
1992	Omelette	Yes	Yes	No	TV special for Fuji TV's La Cuisine; available on Initial: the Shunji Iwai Collection DVD
1993	Jocx Midnight Music Aesthetics	Yes	No	No	TV Special
1993	Fireworks, Should We See It from the Side or the Bottom?	Yes	Yes	No	Television play
1993	Fried Dragon Fish	Yes	Yes	No	Final TV special for Fuji TV's La Cuisine; available on Initial: the Shunji Iwai Collection DVD
1993	The King of Snow	Yes	Yes	No	TV drama; available on Initial: the Shunji Iwai Collection DVD
1994	Lunatic Love	Yes	Yes	No	TV drama; available on Initial: the Shunji Iwai Collection DVD
2011	Friends After 3.11	Yes	No	Yes	Documentary that explores the aftermath of Japan's 2011 earthquake and tsunami Also producer and received a theatrical release in 2012
2014	Mysterious Transfer Student	No	Yes	Yes	Miniseries
2017	A Bride for Rip Van Winkle: The Serial Edition	Yes	Yes	Yes	Extended version of his film "A Bride for Rip Van Winkle" adapted into a miniseries Also based on his novel

=== TV appearances ===
- Friends After 3.11 (2011)
- The movie continues to sound the alarm to the world (2012)
- Shunji Iwai Film Festival Presents My Little Film Festival (2012)
- Scola Ryuichi Sakamoto School of Music <Movie Music Edition> (2013)
- Shunji Iwai MOVIE LAB (2015–2016)
- 3.26 "Rip Van Winkle's Bride" Commemorative 24-hour Whole Shunji Iwai (2016)
- YEN TOWN BAND ・ Lily Chou-Chou Project ~Yento Space in Inujima~ (2016)
- Nobuhiko Obayashi Film Festival! ～Flower basket flower language What I want to pass on now. Nobuhiko Obayashi x Shunji Iwai x Takako Tokiwa Special Trial Talk (2017)
- Under this sky that two people can see Makoto Shinkai x Shunji Iwai (2020)
- Let's change the future with movies ~ A message from Nobuhiko Obayashi to four directors (2020)
- Close-up Gendai + Asked about "the power to change the future"-A testament from Nobuhiko Obayashi (2020)

== Online short films ==
Year	Title	Director	Writer	Editor	Notes
2003	Hana and Alice	Yes	Yes	Yes	Short webseries later adapted into a feature length-film of the same name Also producer and composer
2014	Town Workers	Yes	Yes	No	Short animated webseries
2017	Chang-Ok's Letters	Yes	Yes	Yes	Short miniseries commissioned by Nestlé; Also composer
2017	Halfway Road	No	Yes	No	Also composer
2018	Wish Upon a Star	No	No	Yes	Short webseries Edited Episode 3: "1 Hour for a Shooting Star"
2019	Little Letter	Yes	Yes	Yes	Short film commissioned by Nestlé
2020	The 12 Day Tale of the Monster that Died in 8	Yes	Yes	Yes	Short webseries later adapted into a feature length-film of the same name Also cinematographer
2020	Even If I Could Find You In My Dreams	Yes	Yes	Yes	Also cinematographer
2023	Lemon Dream	Yes	Yes	Yes	Also cinematographer

=== Producer only ===
- Koibana-Watermelon and adhesive plaster (2009)
- HaraI Monogatari: "One Night in Chengdu" (2013)
- HaraI Monogatari: "Grandpa's Secret" (2013)
- HaraI Monogatari: "Sayonara Hot Pot" (2013)

== Music videos ==
=== Director ===
Year	Title	Artist	Notes
1988	Someday Somewhere	Keisuke Kutakawa	
1988	Girl	Yuko Hara	
1988	How are you?	Miko Morikawa	
1989	April White Paper	Sumika Yamakana	
1989	Why	Sumika Yamanaka	
1989	J's Bar	Hiroyuki Kurata	
1989	I'm Only Dreaming	Miwa Kawagoe	
1989	Broken Heart	Chami Satonaka	
1989	Shine the Most	Miki Fujitani	
1990	On a Sunny Slope	Tokyo Boys	
1990	Key to the Heart	Miwa Kawagoe	
1990	Umi	Miyoko Yoshimoto	
1990	NEXT	Rizzo Tachibana	
1990	Put me on Your Song	Tokyo Boys	
1990	Midusummer Shadow	Yuki Hoshino	
1990	1960's Gun	Wells	
1990	Good-Bye	Rie Sugimoto	
1990	Welcome Home Again	The Shamrock	
1990	Present	Tokyo Boys	
1990	LaPaPa	The Shamrock	
1990	Shy Shy Japanese	Tokyo Boys	
1991	Good-Bye My Loneliness	Zard	
1991	Harmony	Tokyo Boys	
1991	Five	The Shamrock	
1991	Blue Light Yokosuka	Mi-ke	
1991	I want to Change the Times	Rikuo	
1991	Fushigi ne...	Zard	
1991	Silent Mobius~Sailing	Tokyo Boys	
1991	Fairy Sketch	Rie Sugimoto	
1991	Whistling Way Home	PAN PAN HOUSE	
1991	Love only for You	FLYING KIDS	
1991	Mō Sagasanai	Zard	
1991	I Want to Give to You a Merry X'Mas	Masami Inoue	
1991	BLANCIN' LOVE	Masaki Inoue	
1991	Merry Christmas to You	Maeda Wataru	
1991	White 2 White-Reef	Mi-Ke	
1992	Yumemiru JACK & BETTY	The 5 Teardrops	
1992	Goodbye, I Love You	The 5 Teardrops	
1992	I am your Santa Claus	The 5 Teardrops	
1992	Room Y-Shirt and Me	Ari Hiramatsu	
1992	Don't Stop Spring	Nagasawa Gijuku	
1992	Sad Teddy Boy	Mi-Ke	
1992	Let's Sing a Song	Important MAN Brothers Band	
1992	Surffing Japan	Mi-Ke	
1992	SHULABA LA BAMBA	Southern All Stars	
1992	Let's Dance Until Morning	Mi-Ke	
1992	Magic Railway	Reimi	
1992	OCEAN	Reimi	
1992	Last Fragance	Reimi	
1992	I Have No Choice to Laugh	Airi Hiramatsu	
1992	Let's Laugh	BOO WHO WOO	
1992	Monkey's Tail	Nagasawa Gijuku	
1992	Wonder Girl	Reimi	
1992	Like Blue Moon	Mi-Ke	
1992	Yokahama Boy Style	Coco	
1992	Daiseki, I Love You	BOO WHO WOO	
1993	The Reason Why Love is Wonderful	Masami Inoue	
1993	I Want to Live Forever with You	TO BE CONTINUED	
1993	Single is Best?	Ari Hiramatsu	
1993	Good Luck Angel	UP-BEAT	
1993	Variation	Ari Hiramatsu	
1993	Just Look At	Ozo Jinnouichi	
1993	Nice Birdy (NO BIRDY)	Southern All Stars	
1993	Erotica Seven	Southern All Stars	
1995	Cheers for You	Nakayama Miho	
1996	Swallowtail Butterfly (Ai no Uta)	Yen Town Band	Single by the band formed by Iwai's film Swallowtail Butterfly
1996	Knit Cap Man	Moonriders	Special music video in celebration of the 20th Anniversary of the band
1997	Mirror of the Sky	Takako Matsu	
1998	Stay with Me	Takako Matsu	
2000	Gilde	Lily Chou-Chou	Songs by the band formed by Iwai's film All About Lily Chou-Chou
2001	Resonance (Empty Stone)	Lily Chou-Chou	Songs by the band formed by Iwai's film All About Lily Chou-Chou
2001	Wings that Can't Fly	Lily Chou-Chou	Songs by the band formed by Iwai's film All About Lily Chou-Chou
2007	Kumuriota	Ai Otsuka	
2010	Sakura no Shiori	AKB48	
2010	Fluffy	Yui Makino	
2012	Unrequited Love	miwa	
2012	Flowers Will Bloom	Flowers Bloom Project	
2012	Why Not?	Ari Hiramatsu	
2013	Crusising of the Sea of TV	Hana Kuorki & Yuiko Kariya	
2013	Circle of the Thanks	Ayaka	
2013	HOME	Furukawa Honpo	
2014	The Wind's Blowing	Hec & Pascal	
2015	Fish in the Pool	Hec & Pascal	
2015	Ainone	Yen Town Band	Animated music video Single by the band formed by Iwai's film Swallowtail Butterfly
2016	Cosmology	Cocco	
2016	My Town	Yen Town Band	Single by the band formed by Iwai's film Swallowtail Butterfly
2016	Bowknot	Aimer	
2016	Echo, Kotadama	Bank Band	
2016	Your Favourite Color	Hec & Pascal	
2016	Miracle	Illon	
2017	Forever Friends	DAOKO	
2017	Goodbye My Love	ShiorI Niyama	
2018	urar	Chima	General Director
2018	Step	Hitsujibungaku	General Director
2018	Break These Chains	Heku and Pascal	
2018	Before the Star Falls	JY	
2018	Appearance	Alive Year	
2019	Tired of Seeing the Unknown World	ikire	
2020	Kaeru No Uta	Nanana Mori	
2020	Nice to Meet You	Nanana Mori	
2020	Kaeru No Uta ("Last Letter" movie version)	Nanana Mori	Music video for the single for Iwai's film Last Letter
2020	Little Lie	ikire	
2020	Connect	ikire	
2020	Beautiful	ikire	
2020	Letter	ikire	
2020	Aoi	ikire	
2021	Flowers Bloom 2021	Flowers Bloom Project	
2021	Even If We Can Meet in a Dream Music Issue ~for rooftop~	Alexandros	
2021	Take me Fantagen	Kyoko Koizumi	
2021	Tomorrow's hot water will boil tomorrow	Moeka Hoshi	
2021	A Monster That Wants To Be Enough	ikire	
2021	Next Door Monster	ikire	
2021	A Monster, Not a Dream	ikire	
2021	Hikari	ikire	
2022	Another Day Goes By	Lizabet	

=== Producer ===
Year	Title	Artist	Notes
2020	I Don't Need a Reply	Nanana Mori	Music video directed by Ryo Furukawa
2020	Beautiful	ikire	Music video directed by Emi Tai

== Commercials ==
=== Director ===
Year	Title	Company
1994	Nissan Lichuno	Nissan
1994	Sasion Group	Sasion Group
1994	IH Jar Rice Cooker	National
1996	Live Notebooks	Panasonic
1997	Thanks Fair Winter	NTT
1997	Thanks Fair Summer	NTT
1997	OCN	NTT
1997	ISDN	NTT
1997	D-MAIL	NTT
1998	Legaia Legend	Sony Computer Entertainment
1999	Like a Long Sigh	The Brilliant Green
2002	Salon Style	Kosé
2002	Sokenbicha	Coca-Cola Japan
2002	It's My Life	LIFE CARD
2003	PanaHome	PanaHome
2003	Kit Kat	Nestlé Japan
2003	It's My Life	LIFE CARD
2007	Mitsubishi UFJ Securities	Mitsubishi UFJ Securities
2012	BS	Japanese Movie Specialty Channel
2013	Nescafe Excella	Nestlé Japan
2013	Kit Kat	Nestlé Japan
2019	Kit Kat	Nestlé Japan

== Live concerts ==
=== Director ===
Year	Title	Notes
2016	ETON KUNAN in FUJANA	Live Concert movie
2018	Clamboon x Shunji Iwai "Hiba Open Air Concert Hall Live	Live Concert movie
2020	CHRONIC: Special Small Concert	Live concert with music of his movie Last Letter aired on YouTube
2021	Yen Town Special Band Special Live in Kurkku Fields	Live concert in honor of the 25th Anniversary of his movie Swallowtail Butterfly aired on U-NEXT

== Bibliography ==
=== Novels ===
- Love Letter (1995)
- Swallowtail Butterfly (1996)
- Wallace Mermaid (1997)
- All About Lily Chou-Chou (2001)
- Watchdog Protects the Garden (2012)
- Vampire (2012)
- A Bride for Rip Van Winkle (2015)
- The Kids who Wanted to See the Fireworks from Another Perspective (2017)
- Last Letter (2018)
- Last Summer of Zero (2021)
- Kyrie's Song (2023)

==== Original work ====
- The Murder Case of Hana & Alice [Author: Outsuchi] (2015)
- Fireworks, Should We See It form the Side or the Bottom? [Author: Hitoshi Onne] (2017)

=== Graphic novels ===
- Love Letter VOL.1/VOL.2 (1995)
- Storyboards of Swallowtail Butterfly VOL.1/VOL.2 (1996)
- Hana & Alice (2004)

==== Original work ====
- The Murder Case of Hana & Alice [Manga: Seimei Doman] (2015)
- Fireworks, Should We See It form the Side or the Bottom? VOL.1/VOL.2 [Manga: Makoto Fugetsu] (2017)

=== Essays/Interviews books ===
- Trash Basket Theatre (1997)
- Magic Launcher (1998)
- NOW and THEN: Shunji Iwai (1998)
- Film Makers (2001)
- Don't Spell Words Lighter than the Silence (2012)
- Shunji Iwai: From "Love Letter" to "Last Letter" to "Chifa's Letter" (2020)
- Kei Meno's Art Book Just as it was Before He Wrote Words (2021)

=== Photo albums ===
- LETTERS in "Love Letter" (1995)
- "Undo" Photo Album (1995)
- Scrap of "Yentown" (1996)
- "Picnic" Photo Album (1996)
- April Front April Story(1998)
- "Hana & Alice" Photo Gallery (2004)
- Haru Kuroki's photo collection of the movie A Bride for Rip Van Winkle

=== Audiobooks ===
- Eraser (2021)
