= Salyu discography =

- Studio albums: 6
- Compilation albums: 1
- Singles: 14
- B-sides: 17
- Video albums: 1
- Music videos: 19

The discography of Salyu consists of six studio albums, one compilations album, and 14 solo singles, four collaboration singles and one DVD. Out of her releases, her 2007 album Terminal is her most successful, being certified gold by the RIAJ.

Most of Salyu's music is written and produced by Takeshi Kobayashi, however occasionally other musicians write and compose for Salyu. Salyu has written the lyrics to 11 songs: "Birthday," "Cure the World," "Extension," "L.A.F.S.," "I" (アイ（Ｉ）, Ai), "I Believe," "Iris (Shiawase no Hako)" (しあわせの箱; "Box of Happiness"), "Liberty," "Sweet Pain," "Tangram" (タングラム, Tanguramu) and "Whereabouts (For Anthony)." She has co-written six songs' lyrics: "Dialogue," "Halfway," "Life Is Beautiful," "Mirror," "Sōkyokusen" (双曲線; "Hyperbola") and "Taion" (体温; "Temperature"). She wrote the music for "Cruise" and "L.A.F.S.," also producing the sound for "L.A.F.S."

== Albums ==
=== Studio albums ===
Title	Album details	Peak chart positions	Sales
Title	Album details	JPN	Sales
Landmark	Released: June 15, 2005; Label: Toy's Factory (TFCC-86181); Formats: CD, digital download	22	JPN: 29,473
Terminal	Released: January 17, 2007; Label: Toy's Factory (TFCC-86213); Formats: CD, digital download	2	JPN: 87,334
Maiden Voyage	Released: March 24, 2010; Label: Toy's Factory (TFCC-86324); Formats: CD, digital download	7	JPN: 31,744
S(o)un(d)beams	Under the name Salyu x Salyu; Released: March 23, 2011; Label: Toy's Factory (TFCC-86345); Formats: CD, digital download	12	JPN: 13,156
photogenic	Released: February 15, 2012; Label: Toy's Factory (TFCC-86376); Formats: CD, digital download	6	
Android & Human Being	Released: April 22, 2015; Label: Toy's Factory (TFCC-86514); Formats: CD, digital download	14	

=== Compilation album ===
Title	Album details	Peak chart positions	Sales
Title	Album details	JPN	Sales
Merkmal	Released: November 26, 2008; Label: Toy's Factory (TFCC-86283); Formats: CD, digital download	13	JPN: 39,768

== Singles ==
=== As lead artist ===
Title	Year	Peak chart positions		Sales	Album
Title	Year	JPN Oricon	JPN Hot	Sales	Album
"Valon-1"	2004	34	—N/a	9,300	Landmark
"Dialogue"	2004	74	—N/a	4,500	Landmark
"Peaty"	2005	92	—N/a	2,100	Landmark
"Suisei" (彗星; "Comet")	2005	54	—N/a	5,300	Landmark
"Kaze ni Noru Fune" (風に乗る船; "Ship Sailing in the Breeze")	2005	29	—N/a	6,900	Terminal
"Tower"	2006	33	—N/a	7,300	Terminal
"Name"	2006	15	—N/a	17,000	Terminal
"Platform" (プラットホーム, Purattohōmu)	2006	16	—N/a	19,000	Terminal
"Liberty"	2007	14	—N/a	7,900	Maiden Voyage
"Iris (Shiawase no Hako)" (しあわせの箱; "Box of Happiness")	2007	26	—N/a	10,000	Maiden Voyage
"Corteo (Gyōretsu) / Halfway" (コルテオ～行列～; "Corteo (Procession)")	2009	10	6	16,000	Maiden Voyage
"Extension"	2009	21	32	7,200	Maiden Voyage
"Atarashii Yes" (新しいYES; "New Yes")	2010	14	6	7,000	Maiden Voyage
"Life"	2010	21	7	8,500	Photogenic
"Aozora / Magic" (青空; "Blue Skies")	2011	16	4	7,400	Photogenic
"Hanashitai Anata to" (話したいあなたと; "I Want to Talk with You")	2011	—	—		s(o)un(d)beams
"Lighthouse"	2012	19	20		Photogenic
"Ji bun ga inai" (じぶんがいない; "I don't have myself")	2013	—	—		Ghost in the Shell Arise (Original Soundtrack)
"Ai ni Yukeru / Line" (アイニユケル / ライン)	2014	42	60		Android & Human Being
"Bokura no deatta basho" (僕らの出会った場所; The place we met)	2019	—	—		TBA
"Taxi"	2021	—	—		TBA

=== As featured artist ===
Title	Year	Peak chart positions			Sales	Album
Title	Year	JPN Oricon	JPN Hot	JPN RIAJ	Sales	Album
"Valon" Ilmari with Salyu	2004	12	—N/a	—	29,000	Non-album single
"To U" Bank Band with Salyu	2006	2	—N/a	—	320,000	Sōshisōai 2
"Mirror" Wise feat. Salyu	2008	40	28	—	4,100	Love Quest
"Life Is Beautiful" Miss Monday feat. Salyu, Kiyosaku (of Mongol800) and Shock Eye (of Shōnan no Kaze)	2010	41	60	22	4,200	Beautiful
"All You Need Is Love" with Japan United with Music (Note: Special charity single for recovery from the 2011 Tōhoku earthquake and tsunami. Produced by Sakamoto Ryuichi and Takeshi Kobayashi, it features Salyu, EXILE ATSUSHI, EXILE TAKAHIRO, Yellow Magic Orchestra, Crystal Kay, Hotei Tomoyasu, Sakurai Kazutoshi, SUGIZO, Hitoto Yo, Miki Imai, GAMO (Tokyo Ska Paradise Orchestra), Masahiko Kitahara (Tokyo Ska Paradise Orchestra), Kj (Dragon Ash), Kyoko Koizumi, JUJU, Superfly, Tortoise Matsumoto, NARGO (Tokyo Ska Paradise Orchestra), Naoto Inti Raymi, Akihiro Namba (Hi-STANDARD), Verbal, Ryota Fujimaki (Remioromen), miwa, Gota Yashiki, Atsushi Yanaka (Tokyo Ska Paradise Orchestra), Ai and BONNIE PINK.)	2012	11	18	—	26,000	All You Need Is Love (Japan United with Music)
"Physical" Bradberry Orchestra feat. Suga Shikao, Crystal Kay and Salyu	2012	—	72	—		Non-album singles
"What A Wonderful World" Takeshi Kobayashi with Salyu	2016	—	—	—		Non-album singles
"Happy Life" Mika Nakashima with Salyu	2017	—	—	—		Non-album singles
"Message" (MESSAGE -メッセージ-) Bank Band with Salyu	2018	—	9	—		Non-album singles

== DVDs ==
List of media, with selected chart positions
Title	Album details	Peak positions	
Title	Album details	JPN DVD	JPN Blu-ray
Salyu Clips 2004-2007	Released: November 28, 2007; Label: Toy's Factory; Formats: DVD	37	—
s(o)un(d)beams+	Released under salyu x salyu; Released: February 1, 2012; Label: Toy's Factory; Formats: DVD	10	—
LIVE DVD「Salyu 10th Anniversary concert “ariga10”」	Released: October 15, 2014; Label: Toy's Factory; Formats: DVD	6	—

== Other appearances ==
Release	Artist	Title	Notes	Album
2001	Mr. Children	"Hana" (花; "Flower")	Background vocals with Akko (My Little Lover)	"Yasashii Uta" (single)
2003	Tatsuya Kokufu	"Uta" (うた; "Song")	Background vocals	Rock Tensei
2007	Mr. Children	"Pocket Castanets" (ポケット カスタネット, Poketto Kasutanetto)	Background vocals	Home
2007	Mr. Children	"Sunrise"	Background vocals	Home
2007	Mr. Children	"Tōri Ame" (通り雨; "Rain Shower")	Background vocals	Home
2007	Mr. Children	"Wake Me Up!"	Background vocals	Home
2007	Quruli feat. Salyu	"Wien 5"		"Kotoba wa Sankaku, Kokoro wa Shikaku" (single)
2009	Bradberry Orchestra feat. Salyu & Erii	"Lucky"	Only released as a ringtone	–
2010	Caterpillar	"Ashiato" (足跡; "Footsteps")	Digital download, band featuring Takeshi Kobayashi, Yo Hitoto, Salyu, Gaku-MC, Tosaka Kyōdai, and Wakadanna	–
2010	Tavito Nanao	"Kensaku Shōnen" (検索少年; "Research Boy")		Billion Voices
2010	Tavito Nanao	"One Voice (Moshi mo Watashi ga Koe o Dasetara)" (one voice （もしもわたしが声を出せたら）; "What If I Could Speak")		Billion Voices
2010	Mr. Children	"Toriko" (虜; "Prisoner")	Background Vocals	Split the Difference (DVD)
2013	Cornelius, Voice: salyu x salyu	"Colour Magic" (カラーマジック)		NHK Design Ah!
