= Replay (Mr. Children song) =

Single by Mr. Children

from the album Versus and Mr. Children 1992–1995
- Released: July 1, 1993
- Recorded: 13:38
- Genre: Pop rock, power pop
- Label: Toy's Factory
- Songwriter(s): Kazutoshi Sakurai
- Producer(s): Takeshi Kobayashi

Mr. Children singles chronology
"Dakishimetai" (1992)	"Replay" (1993)	"Cross Road" (1993)

"Replay" is the third single released by Mr. Children on July 1, 1993.

== Overview ==
The single reached #19 on the Oricon Japanese charts selling 88,330 copies during its run on the chart. The title track, "Replay", was used to promote Pocky through commercials and was also included in the group's first compilation album, Mr. Children 1992–1995, which was released on July 11, 2001. The b-side track, "All by myself", was a re-cut from Mr. Children's second album Kind of Love released on December 1, 1992. "Replay" has also been covered by other artists including Sotte Bosse, who covered the song on her album "Moment" released on October 3, 2007.

== Track listing ==
All tracks are written by Kazutoshi Sakurai

No.	Title	Length
1.	"Replay"	4:32
2.	"All by myself"	4:34
3.	"Replay (Instrumental Version)"	4:32

== Personnel ==
- Kazutoshi Sakurai – vocals, guitar
- Kenichi Tahara – guitar
- Keisuke Nakagawa – bass
- Hideya Suzuki – drums

== Production ==
- Producer – Kobayashi Takeshi
- Arrangement - Mr. Children and Takeshi Kobayashi
- Recording - Kunihiko Imai
- Mixing - Kunihiko Imai
