= Kimi ga Ita Natsu =

Single by Mr. Children

from the album Everything, Kind of Love, and Mr. Children 1992–1995
- Released: August 21, 1992
- Genre: Pop rock
- Length: 16:03
- Label: Toy's Factory
- Songwriter(s): Kazutoshi Sakurai
- Producer(s): Takeshi Kobayashi

Mr. Children singles chronology
"Kimi ga Ita Natsu" (1992)	"Dakishimetai" (1992)

Kimi ga Ita Natsu (君がいた夏, "The Summer When You Were There") is the first, and debut, single released by Mr. Children on August 21, 1992.

== Overview ==
The single reached #69 on the Oricon Japanese charts selling 21,710 copies. The title track was a cut from Mr. Children's debut album, Everything, which was released on May 10, 1992. The b-side track, "Good-Bye My Gloomy Days" (グッバイ・マイ・グルーミーデイズ), is included in the group's second album, Kind of Love, released on December 1, 1992. "Kimi ga Ita Natsu" (君がいた夏) was also included in Mr. Children's first compilation album Mr. Children 1992–1995, released on July 11, 2001.

== Track listing ==
All tracks are written by Kazutoshi Sakurai

No.	Title	Length
1.	"Kimi ga Ita Natsu (君がいた夏)"	5:54
2.	"Good-Bye My Gloomy Days (グッバイ・マイ・グルーミーデイズ)"	4:15
3.	"Kimi ga Ita Natsu (Instrumental Version) (君がいた夏 (Instrumental Version))"	5:54

== Personnel ==
- Kazutoshi Sakurai – vocals, guitar
- Kenichi Tahara – guitar
- Keisuke Nakagawa – bass
- Hideya Suzuki – drums

== Production ==
- Producer – Kobayashi Takeshi
- Arrangement - Mr. Children and Takeshi Kobayashi
