= Versus (Mr. Children album) =

Studio album by Mr. Children
- Released: September 1, 1993
- Recorded: Waterfront Studios, Tokyo Hilton Hotel, Hitokuchizaka Studio, and Avaco Studio
- Genre: Pop rock, power pop
- Length: 45:25
- Label: Toy's Factory
- Producer: Takeshi Kobayashi

Mr. Children chronology
Kind of Love (1992)	Versus (1993)	Atomic Heart (1994)

Singles from Kind of Love
- 1. "Replay" Released: July 1, 1993

Versus is the third, and second full-length album, by Japanese rock band Mr. Children released on September 1, 1993. The album debuted on the Japanese Oricon music charts at #3 and sold 802,140 copies during its run on the chart. Just like the previous two albums, Versus contains only one single released on July 1, 1993, titled "Replay" with another album track "And I close to you" also being included in Mr. Children's fourth single "Cross Road". Versus also marked the first time use of Takeshi Kobayashi as a writer and composer for Mr. Children.

== Track listing ==
No.	Title	Lyrics	Music	Length
1.	"Another Mind"	Kazutoshi Sakurai	Kazutoshi Sakurai	5:01
2.	"Main Street ni ikou (メインストリートに行こう)"	Kazutoshi Sakurai	Kazutoshi Sakurai, Takeshi Kobayashi	3:45
3.	"and I close to you"	Kazutoshi Sakurai	Kazutoshi Sakurai, Takeshi Kobayashi	4:12
4.	"Replay"	Kazutoshi Sakurai	Kazutoshi Sakurai	4:29
5.	"Marmalade kiss (マーマレード・キッス)"	Kazutoshi Sakurai	Kazutoshi Sakurai, Takeshi Kobayashi	4:33
6.	"Shinkirou (蜃気楼)"	Kazutoshi Sakurai, Takeshi Kobayashi	Kazutoshi Sakurai, Takeshi Kobayashi	4:41
7.	"Toubousha (逃亡者)"	Takeshi Kobayashi	Takeshi Kobayashi	4:09
8.	"LOVE"	Kazutoshi Sakurai	Kazutoshi Sakurai	4:04
9.	"Sayonara wa yume no naka he (さよならは夢の中へ)"	Kazutoshi Sakurai	Kazutoshi Sakurai, Takeshi Kobayashi	5:44
10.	"my life"	Kazutoshi Sakurai	Kazutoshi Sakurai	4:27

== Personnel ==
- Kazutoshi Sakurai – vocals, guitar
- Kenichi Tahara – guitar
- Keisuke Nakagawa – bass
- Hideya Suzuki – drums, vocals
- Carol Steele - percussion
- Takuo Yamamoto - tenor, baritone sax, recorder
- Yoichi Murata - trombone
- Toshio Araki - trumpet

== Production ==
Production credits for album:

- Producer - Takeshi Kobyashi
- Executive producer - Takamitsu Ide, Mitsunori Kadoike
- Recording - Kunihiko Imai^{[a]}, Hiroshi Hiranuma, and Doug Conroy
- Mixing - Hiroshi Hiranuma, Kunihiko Imai^{[a]}
- Brass arrangement - Takuo Yamamoto^{[b]}
- A&R chief - Koichi Inaba
- A&R director - Makoto Nakanishi, Katsumi Shinohara
- Computer programming - Ken Matsumoto
- Assistant engineering - Greg Digesu, Jeff Mauriello, Kenji Nagashima, Yoshitaka Shirahata, Kei Kosaka, and Tomoaki Sato
- Recording - Waterfront Studios, Tokyo Hilton Hotel, Hitokuchizaka Studio, and Avaco Studio
- Mixed at - Peninsula, Studio Vincent
- Mastering - Gateway Mastering
- Mastered by - Bob Ludwig
- U.S production supervision - Kaz Hayashida
- Account Administration - Jeff Schwartz and Rupert Gray
- Translator - Rika Nakaya
- Recording co-ordination - Akira Yasukawa
- Promotion - Naoki Imoto
- Sales promotion - Masayuki Nakagawa
- Art Direction - Mitsuo Shindo
- Designer - Satoshi Nakamura
- Photographer - Meisa Fujishiro
- Stylist - Hiroko Umeyama
- Marine coordinator - Masato Nagai
- Artist management - Isao Tanuma and Kazushiro Miura
- Desk management - Tomoko Okada
- Production management - Tetsuhiko /nono
- Production co-ordination - Harumi Oshima
- P.R management - Chikane Kumagai

== Footnotes ==
- a. Kunihiko Imai is credited for mixing and recording the song "Replay" only.
- b. For the song "Main Street ni ikou" and "Toubousha".
