= Cross Road (song) =

Single by Mr. Children

from the album Atomic Heart
- Released: November 10, 1993
- Genre: Power pop, progressive rock
- Length: 13:18
- Label: Toy's Factory
- Songwriter(s): Kazutoshi Sakurai
- Producer(s): Takeshi Kobayashi

Mr. Children singles chronology
"Replay" (1993)	"Cross Road" (1993)	"Innocent World" (1994)

"Cross Road" is the fourth single released by Mr. Children on November 10, 1993.

== Overview ==
The single reached #6 on the Oricon Japanese charts selling 1,255,940 copies during its run on the chart. The title track, "Cross Road", was used to promote the Japanese drama Dousoukai (同窓会) and also included in Mr. Children's first compilation album, Mr. Children 1992–1995, released on July 11, 2001. The b-side "And I close to you" was included in Mr. Children's third album, Versus, released on September 9, 1993. "Cross Road" has also been covered by other artists including Junko Yamamoto, who covered the song on her cover album "Songs" released on June 6, 2007 and made its live DVD debut for the first time since its release on Mr. Children's "Home" TOUR 2007 ~in the field~ released on August 6, 2008.

== Track listing ==
No.	Title	Lyrics	Music	Length
1.	"Cross Road"	Kazutoshi Sakurai	Kazutoshi Sakurai	4:33
2.	"and I close to you"	Kazutoshi Sakurai	Kazutoshi Sakurai, Takeshi Kobayashi	4:12
3.	"Cross Road (Instrumental Version)"			4:33

== Personnel ==
- Kazutoshi Sakurai – vocals, guitar
- Kenichi Tahara – guitar
- Keisuke Nakagawa – bass
- Hideya Suzuki – drums

== Production ==
- Producer – Kobayashi Takeshi
- Arrangement - Mr. Children and Takeshi Kobayashi
