= Dakishimetai =

Single by Mr. Children

from the album Kind of Love, 1/42, Mr. Children 1992–1995, and B-Side
- Released: December 1, 1992
- Genre: Pop rock, power pop
- Length: 15:03
- Label: Toy's Factory
- Songwriter(s): Kazutoshi Sakurai
- Producer(s): Takeshi Kobayashi

Mr. Children singles chronology
"Kimi ga Ita Natsu" (1992)	"Dakishimetai" (1992)	"Replay" (1993)

Dakishimetai (抱きしめたい) is the second single released by Mr. Children on December 1, 1992.

== Overview ==
The single reached #56 on the Oricon Japanese charts selling 60,790 copies. The single was released on the same day as the group's second album, Kind of Love, which also included the single in it. "Dakishimetai" (抱きしめたい) was included as a live recording on the group's live album, 1/42, released on September 8, 1999 and Mr. Children 1992–1995, which was released on July 11, 2001. The b-side track, "Kimi no koto igai wa nani mo kangaerarenai" (君の事以外は何も考えられない), was included on the group's compilation album B-Side, released on May 10, 2007.

Over the years the title track, "Dakishimetai" (抱きしめたい), has become a fan favorite in polls as a song desired to be played at weddings and as a song used to charm women. "Dakishimetai" (抱きしめたい) has also been popular amongst other recording artists with Ryuichi Kawamura, lead singer of Luna Sea, covering the song on the anniversary edition of his album Evergreen released on December 5, 2007.

== Track listing ==
All tracks are written by Kazutoshi Sakurai.

No.	Title	Length
1.	"Dakishimetai (抱きしめたい)"	5:27
2.	"Kimi no koto igai wa nani mo kangaerarenai (君の事以外は何も考えられない)"	4:09
3.	"Dakishimetai (Instrumental Version) (抱きしめたい (Instrumental Version))"	5:27

== Personnel ==
- Kazutoshi Sakurai – vocals, guitar
- Kenichi Tahara – guitar
- Keisuke Nakagawa – bass
- Hideya Suzuki – drums

== Production ==
- Producer – Kobayashi Takeshi
- Arrangement - Mr. Children and Takeshi Kobayashi
