= Live 97–99 Mood =

Live album by Chara
- Released: March 8, 2000
- Recorded: 1997–1999
- Genre: J-pop
- Length: 1:42:14
- Label: Epic Records Japan

Chara chronology
Strange Fruits (1999)	Live 97–99 Mood (2000)	Caramel Milk: The Best of Chara (2000)

Live 97–99 Mood (Raibu Kyū Nana kara Kyū Kyū Mūdo) is Chara's first live album, marketed as a 'live best album', released on March 8, 2000. It features recordings from her tours Chara Junior Sweet Tour, Chara Strange Fruits the Live, Chara Strange Fruits the Concert and Chara Concert Tour Duce & the Aurora Band. The album debuted at #20 on the Japanese Oricon album charts, and charted in the top 200 for 4 weeks.

== Development ==
Between 1997 and 1999, Chara performed live venues with her back-up band, the Aurora Band. The band also served as a session band during the recording of her seventh album, Strange Fruits. Their backing is featured on the studio recordings of "Hikari to Watashi", "Duca", "Onna no Ko no Heya", "Hanashite Tōtoi Sono Mirai no Koto o" and "Tsutawatte".

The album consists of recordings from six dates from across four different tours, featuring three different venues. The bulk of the album comes from the Chara Concert Tour Duca & the Aurora Band concert at the NHK Hall on October 22, 1998: eight songs were performed there.

== Other recordings ==
A recording of "Chisa na Tenohira" from the October 22, 1998 performance at NHK Hall was released one year prior to this album, as a B-side for the "70% (Yūgure no Uta)" single. Other recordings of the November 1, 1997 Chara Junior Sweet Tour concert exist. A VHS of this concert simply titled 1997.11.1 was released, featuring both recordings found on this album, along with eight others.

== Track listing ==
Disc One
No.	Title	Writer(s)	Length
1.	"Atashi wa Koko yo" (Japanese: あたしはここよ, lit. 'I'm Here')	Chara	4:02
2.	"Shimashima no Bambi" (Japanese: しましまのバンビ, lit. 'Striped Bambi')	Chara	4:18
3.	"Happy Toy"	Chara; Zentarō Watanabe	7:08
4.	"Doko ni Itta n darō? Ano Baka wa" (Japanese: どこに行ったんだろう? あのバカは, lit. 'Where'd He Go? That Idiot')	Chara; Kohey Tsuchiya	4:18
5.	"Oblaat" (Japanese: オブラート)	Chara; Tadanobu Asano	4:38
6.	"Ano Ie ni Kaerō" (Japanese: あの家に帰ろう, lit. 'Let's Go Back to That House')	Chara; Asano	3:40
7.	"Tsutawatte" (Japanese: つたわって, lit. 'Walking Along')	Chara; Tomoyuki Ishikawa	4:19
8.	"Aoi Tori" (Japanese: 青い鳥, lit. 'Blue Bird')	Chara; U-Ske Asada	4:59
9.	"Swallowtail Butterfly (Ai no Uta)" (Japanese: あいのうた, lit. 'Love Song')	Shunji Iwai; Takeshi Kobayashi	4:59
10.	"Duca"	Chara; Shinichi Igarashi	4:18
Total length:			40:30

Disc Two
No.	Title	Writer(s)	Length
1.	"Usotsuku no ni Narenaide" (Japanese: うそつくのに慣れないで, lit. 'Don't Get Used to Lying')	Chara	4:09
2.	"Watashi wa Kawaii Hito to Iwaretai" (Japanese: 私はかわいい人といわれたい, lit. 'I Wanna Be Called Cute')	Chara; Shinichi Osawa	5:22
3.	"Break These Chain"	Chara	5:59
4.	"Milk" (Japanese: ミルク)	Chara; Ashley Ingram	4:01
5.	"Shanghai Baby" (Japanese: 上海ベイベ)	Chara	5:18
6.	"Time Machine" (Japanese: タイムマシーン)	Chara; Yukio Nagoshi; Hideki Yoshimura	8:20
7.	"Hana no Yume" (Japanese: 花の夢, lit. 'Flower Dream')	Chara	7:19
8.	"Yasashii Kimochi" (Japanese: やさしい気持ち, lit. 'Kind Feelings')	Chara	7:32
9.	"Tiny Tiny Tiny"	Chara	6:33
Total length:			1:01:16

== Sound sources ==
Date	Venue	Tour	Songs
November 1, 1997	Akasaka BLITZ	Chara Junior Sweet Tour	"Break These Chain", "Tiny Tiny Tiny"
October 22, 1998	NHK Hall	Chara Concert Tour Duca & the Aurora Band	"Shimashima no Bambi", "Happy Toy", "Doko ni Itta n darō? Ano Baka wa", "Duca", "Usotsuku no ni Narenaide", "Watashi wa Kawaii Hito to Iwaretai", "Time Machine", "Hana no Yume"
June 28, 1999	Akasaka BLITZ	Chara Strange Fruits the Live	"Yasashii Kimochi"
October 18, 1999	Nakano Sun Plaza	Chara Strange Fruits the Concert	"Shanghai Baby"
October 19, 1999	Nakano Sun Plaza	Chara Strange Fruits the Concert	"Oblaat", "Ano Ie ni Kaerō", "Tsutawatte", "Milk"
October 27, 1999	NHK Hall	Chara Strange Fruits the Concert	"Atashi wa Koko yo", "Aoi Tori", "Swallowtail Butterfly"

== Charts ==
=== Weekly charts ===
Weekly chart performance for Live 97–99 Mood
Chart (2000)	Peak position
Japanese Albums (Oricon)	20

== Release history ==
Release dates and formats for Bad Mode
Region	Date	Format	Label	Ref.
Japan	March 8, 2000	CD	Epic; Sony Music Japan	
Japan	March 8, 2000	LP	File Records	
