= Everything (Mr. Children album) =

Studio album by Mr. Children
- Released: May 10, 1992
- Recorded: Sound Sky Studio, Power House
- Genre: Pop rock, power pop
- Length: 32:11
- Label: Toy's Factory
- Producer: Takeshi Kobayashi

Mr. Children chronology
Everything (1992)	Kind of Love (1992)

Singles from Everything
- 1. "Kimi ga Ita Natsu" Released: August 21, 1992

Everything, is the seven-track EP recorded by Japanese pop rock band Mr. Children, released under the record label Toy's Factory in May 1992. It has generally been considered their first studio album.

In 1991, the band met the record producer Takeshi Kobayashi for the first time. They started the recording together in December of that year, at the Sound Sky and Starship studios. Although the producer suggested changing its lyrics slightly, all songs appeared on the EP had already been written before they signed a recording contract, and also played in their early live performances.

Everything had a steady sales after the band gained public recognition, reaching the top-30 on the Japanese Oricon albums chart and spending 83 weeks on the top-100 with sales of over 450,000 copies. In June 1998, it was certified double-platinum by the Recording Industry Association of Japan for shipments of over 800,000 units.

After the EP came out, they embarked on concert tour with fellow band The Pillows. In August 1992, "Kimi ga Ita Natsu" was issued as the only single from Everything.

== Track listing ==
All tracks are written by Kazutoshi Sakurai, arranged by Mr. Children and Takeshi Kobayashi

No.	Title	Length
1.	"Lord I Miss You (ロード・アイ・ミス・ユー)"	3:42
2.	"Mr.Shining Moon"	4:23
3.	"Kimi ga ita natsu (君がいた夏)"	5:54
4.	"Kaze ~The wind knows how I feel~ (風 ~The wind knows how I feel~)"	3:16
5.	"Tameiki no Nichiyoubi (ためいきの日曜日)"	5:55
6.	"Tomodachi no mama de (友達のままで)"	3:55
7.	"Children's world"	5:07

== Personnel ==
Mr. Children

- Vocals, guitar: Kazutoshi Sakurai
- Guitar: Kenichi Tahara
- Bass: Keisuke Nakagawa
- Drums: Hideya Suzuki

Production

Production credits for album:

- Producer: Takeshi Kobyashi
- Executive producer: Takamitsu Ide, Mitsunori Kadoike
- Co-producer: Koichi Inaba and Mr. Children
- Arranger: Takeshi Kobyashi and Mr. Children
- Engineer: Kunihiko Imai
- Assistant engineer: Hiroshi Tanigawa, Hideyuki Arima, Toshihiko Kataoka, and Tomoaki Sato
- Mixed by: Kunihiko Imai at Vincent Studio
- Computer programming: Yoshinori Kadoya
- Assistant director: Makoto Nakahishi
- Recorded by: Sound Sky Studio, Power House
- Mastered by: Mitsukazu Tanaka at Sony Shinanomachi Studio
- Sound effects: Hirokazu Ogura, Takeshi Yamamoto
- Toy's Factory staff: Masayuki Nakagawa, Yukari Nishioka
- Recording co-coordination: Hiroe Takeshima
- Artist management: Isao Tanuma
- Sub management: Kazushiro Miura (assisted by Tomoko Okada)
- Art director: Mitsuo Shindo
- Designer: Kumiko Tezuka
- Photographer: Mitsuo Shindo, Kiyonori Okuyama, and Masako Saito
- Stylist: Hiroko Umeyama and Akemi Mutoh
- Hair and make-up: Akemi Nakano and Megumi Hiraoku
- Illustrator: Hikaru Kawahara

== Charts ==
Peak positions

Chart	Position
Japanese Oricon Albums Chart	25

Year-end charts

Chart (1994)	Position
Japanese Albums Chart	91
Chart (1995)	Position
Japanese Albums Chart	91

== Certifications ==
Region	Certification	Certified units/sales
Japan (RIAJ)	2× Platinum	800,000^{^}
^{^} Shipments figures based on certification alone.
