= Mr. Children 1992–1995 =

Compilation album by Mr. Children
- Released: July 11, 2001
- Recorded: 1992–1995
- Genre: Pop rock, power pop, progressive rock
- Length: 75:18
- Label: Toy's Factory
- Producer: Mr. Children; Takeshi Kobayahi

Mr. Children chronology
Q (2000)	Mr. Children 1992–1995 (2001)	Mr. Children 1996–2000 (2001)

Mr. Children 1992–1995, is a compilation album by Mr. Children, released on July 11, 2001.

This is a compilation of selected album and single tracks from 1992 to 1995, released on the same day as Mr. Children 1996–2000. It is the sixth best-selling album of 2001 in Japan, according to Oricon.

== Track listing ==
1. 君がいた夏(Kimi Ga Ita Natsu) - 5:53
2. 星になれたら(Hoshi Ni Naretara - 5:03
3. 抱きしめたい(Dakishimetai) - 5:26
4. Replay - 4:31
5. LOVE - 4:07
6. my life - 4:29
7. CROSS ROAD - 4:35
8. innocent world - 5:47
9. Dance Dance Dance - 4:59
10. 雨のち晴れ(Ame Nochi Hare) - 5:37
11. Over - 4:44
12. Tomorrow never knows - 5:09
13. everybody goes -秩序のない現代にドロップキック- - 4:38
14. 【es】 ～Theme of es～ - 5:51
15. シーソーゲーム ～勇敢な恋の歌～ - 4:31
