= Atomic Heart (album) =

Studio album by Mr. Children
- Released: September 1, 1994
- Recorded: Tokyufun, Tokyo Hilton Hotel, Oorong-soh, Sound Village Studio, Victor Yamanakako Studio, Free Studio, and Baybridge Studio
- Genre: Pop rock, power pop, progressive rock
- Length: 54:11
- Label: Toy's Factory
- Producer: Takeshi Kobayahi

Mr. Children chronology
Versus (1993)	Atomic Heart (1994)	Shinkai (1996)

Singles from Atomic Heart
- 1. "Cross Road" Released: November 10, 1993; 2. "Innocent World" Released: June 1, 1994

Atomic Heart is the fourth studio album by Japanese rock band Mr. Children, released in September 1994. The album features two successful lead singles "Cross Road" and "Innocent World".

== Background ==
In November 1993, the band released their fourth single "Cross Road". It provided the band with their first top-10 hit (peaked at #6) on the Japanese Oricon singles chart, and remained on the chart for about one year. Success of a single brought the band into prominence by 1994. Their follow-up single "Innocent World", which was featured in the TV advertisement for Coca-Cola's sports drink Aquarius, came out in June 1994 and immediately went straight to the top on the chart. It stayed 2 weeks at #1 and remained the chart for 41 weeks, selling over 1.9 million copies and becoming that year's top-selling single in Japan. Popularity of the band had soared before the album was released.

== Reception ==
Stimulated by those smash hit singles, Atomic Heart debuted at #1 on the Japanese albums chart with first-week sales of over 852,000 copies. On the 1994 year-end charts published by the Oricon, it is ranked at the third best-selling album of that year with sales of 1.7 million copies. It continuously sold well in the following year, selling further 1.5 million units and reaching number-six on that year's top-selling list. The album eventually spent 96 weeks on the Oricon top-100, with cumulative sales of over 3.4 million copies during its chart run. In November 1995, the album was certified triple million by the Recording Industry Association of Japan, for shipments of over 3 million units. Atomic Heart was once the top-selling album in Japan, until outsold by Globe's eponymous first album in 1996.

Along with its lead single "Innocent World", Atomic Heart won the 36th Japan Record Awards on New Year's Eve of 1994. The artist, who had flown to Australia for preparation of their forthcoming concert tour, did not attend the ceremony. There was a convention that the award's winners had been supposed to attend the ceremony absolutely, therefore their absence caused little controversy.

== Track listing ==
All lyrics are written by Kazutoshi Sakurai, except where noted; all music is composed by Sakurai, except where noted

No.	Title	Lyrics	Music	Length
1.	"Printing"			0:24
2.	"Dance dance dance"		Sakurai, Takeshi Kobayashi	4:57
3.	"Love connection (ラヴ コネクション)"		Sakurai, Kobayashi	4:57
4.	"Innocent World"			5:45
5.	"Classmate (クラスメイト)"			5:27
6.	"Cross Road"			4:33
7.	"Jealousy (ジェラシー)"	Kobayashi	Sakurai, Kobayashi	6:41
8.	"Asia (Asia) (Asia (エイジア))"		Hideya Suzuki	5:22
9.	"Rain"			0:20
10.	"Ame nochi hare (雨のち晴れ)"		Sakurai, Kobayashi	5:34
11.	"Round About ~Kodoku no Shōzō~ (Round About 〜孤独の肖像〜)"			5:25
12.	"Over"			4:27

== Personnel ==
- Kazutoshi Sakurai – vocals, guitar
- Kenichi Tahara – guitar
- Keisuke Nakagawa – bass
- Hideya Suzuki – drums
- Takuo Yamamoto - alto, soprano, tenor sax
- Toshio Araki - trumpet, flugelhorn
- Hirokazu Ogura - bouzouki, electric guitar
- Tomoko - chorus

== Production ==
Production credits for album:

- Producer - Takeshi Kobayashi
- Arrangement - Mr. Children and Takeshi Kobyashi
- Executive producer - Takamitsu Ide, Akira Yasukawa
- Co-producer - Hiroshi Hiranuma
- Recording - Hiroshi Hiranuma
- Mixing - Hiroshi Hiranuma
- A&R - Koichi Inaba
- Director - Katsumi Shinohara
- Computer programming - Rentaro Takayasu, Yoshinori Kadoya, and Ken Matsumoto
- Assistant engineering - Yoshiki Fukushima, Shigeki Kashii, Kezo Awano, Naoaki Nemoto, and Takeshi Okano
- Recorded at - Tokyufun, Tokyo Hilton Hotel, Oorong-soh, Sound Village Studio, Victor Yamanakako Studio, Free Studio Tsukiji, and Baybridge Studio
- Mixed at - Tokyufun, Free Studio Tsukiji
- Mastering - Sterling Studio NY
- Mastered by - George Marino
- U.S production supervision - Ami Matsumura
- Public Relations - Masayuki Nakagawa
- Promotion staff - Tomohiro Okada, Tetsuya Yamamura, Michiharu Sato, Junichi Ashikawa
- Art Direction - Mitsuo Shindo
- Designer - Ryoji Ohya
- Photographer - Itaru Hirama
- Stylist - Hiroko Umeyama
- Hair and make-up - Miyuki Watanabe

== Charts ==
=== Weekly charts ===
Chart	Position
Japanese Albums Chart	1

=== Year-end charts ===
Year	Chart	Position
1994	Japanese Albums Chart	3
1995	Japanese Albums Chart	6

=== All-time chart ===
Chart (1970–2005)	Position
Japanese Oricon Albums Chart	12

== Certifications ==
Region	Certification	Certified units/sales
Japan (RIAJ)	3× Million	3,429,650
