= Kind of Love =

Studio album by Mr. Children
- Released: December 1, 1992
- Recorded: Sound Sky Studio, Power House, Victor Studio
- Genre: Pop rock, power pop
- Length: 52:16
- Label: Toy's Factory
- Producer: Takeshi Kobayashi

Mr. Children chronology
Everything (1992)	Kind of Love (1992)	Versus (1993)

Singles from Kind of Love
- 1. "Dakishimetai" Released: December 1, 1992

Kind of Love is the first long-play record by Japanese rock band Mr. Children. The album was issued in December 1992, only 7 months after the release of their debut EP entitled Everything. It has commonly been regarded as the band's second studio album.

Basic tracks for Kind of Love were recorded in the suite of Hilton Tokyo Hotel, and later additional instruments and backing vocals were overdubbed in the studios. The album consists of 11 songs mostly composed by the band's primary singer-songwriter Kazutoshi Sakurai, including some of which co-written by the producer Takeshi Kobayashi or the Jun Sky Walker(s)' bassist Yohito Teraoka. Drummer Hideya Suzuki also contributed one track "Shishunki no Natsu" featuring his lead vocals. It has been one of the only two released songs not sung by a frontman of the group.

Along with the album, "Dakishimetai" was simultaneously released as a single. The lead-off track of the album, "Niji no Kanata e" was later featured as the theme song for the original animated video Shōnan Bakusōzoku 9: Omae to Ore no Good Luck!

Like their first EP, Kind of Love, sold steadily after the band's commercial breakthrough, peaking at #13 on the Japanese Oricon albums chart in February 1995. During the 1990s, It had entered the top-100 for 159 non-consecutive weeks, with estimated sales of approximately 1.2 million copies during its chart run. In 2000, the album was certified quadruple platinum by the Recording Industry Association of Japan, for shipments of over 1.6 million units.

== Track listing ==
All songs arranged by Takeshi Kobayashi and Mr.Children

No.	Title	Writer(s)	Length
1.	"Niji no kanata e (虹の彼方へ)"		3:35
2.	"All by Myself"		4:34
3.	"Blue"		4:56
4.	"Dakishimetai (抱きしめたい)"		5:27
5.	"Good-Bye My Gloomy Days (グッバイ・マイ・グルーミーデイズ)"		4:14
6.	"Distance"		5:12
7.	"Kuruma no Naka de Kakurete Kiss wo Shiyou (車の中でかくれてキスをしよう)"		5:21
8.	"Shishunki no Natsu ~Kimi to no Koi ga Ima mo Makiba ni~ (思春期の夏～君との恋が今も牧場に～)"		3:39
9.	"Hoshi ni Naretara (星になれたら)"	Sakurai, Yohito Teraoka	5:03
10.	"Teenage Dream (I~II) (ティーンエイジ・ドリーム（I～II）)"		6:08
11.	"Itsu no Hi ni ka Futari de (いつの日にか二人で）)"		4:13

== Personnel ==
Credits adapted from liner notes of the album

Mr. Children

- Kazutoshi Sakurai – lead vocals, guitar
- Kenichi Tahara – guitar
- Keisuke Nakagawa – bass guitar
- Hideya Suzuki – drums, backing vocals

Guest musicians

- Takuo Yamamoto – baritone, soprano, and tenor saxophones
- Yoichi Murata – trombone
- Toshio Araki – trumpet, flügelhorn
- Hirokazu Ogura – guitar
- Shozo Kimura – guitar
- Shoko Suzuki – backing vocals
- Tomoko – backing vocals
- Hijiri Kuwano Group – string arrangement

Production

- Takeshi Kobayashi – producer
- Takamitsu Ide, Mitsunori Kadoike – executive producer
- Kunihiko Imai, Hiroshi Hiranuma, and Tsuyoshi Inoue – recording and mixing engineer
- Koichi Inaba – A&R producer
- Makoto Nakanishi – director
- Ken Matsumoto – computer programming
- Sound Sky Studio, Power House, Victor Studio, others (Note: The album booklet names Sound Sky Studio, Power House, and Victor Studio as studios in which the album was recorded in addition to adding and more to the list, but does not state other studio locations.) – recording
- West Side Studio, Studio Somewhere – mixing
- Hiroshi Tanigawa, Hideyuki Arima, Kenichi Hayashi, Tatsuya Kawakami, and Masatatsu Tsubuki – assistant engineer
- Masterdisk – mastering
- Bob Ludwig – mastering engineer
- Hero Associates Inc. – U.S. production supervisor
- Hiroe Takeshima – recording co-coordination
- Naoki Imoto – promotion
- Masayuki Nakagawa – sales promotion
- Isao Tanuma, Kazushiro Miura – artist management
- Tomoko Okada – desk management
- Tetsuhiko /nono – production management
- Harumi Oshima – production co-ordination
- Chikane Kumagai – P.R. management
- Mitsuo Shindo – art director
- Kumiko Tezuka – designer
- Hiroyuki Ishiee – photographer
- Hiroko Umeyama – stylist
- Akemi Nakano – hair and make-up

== Charts ==
=== Weekly charts ===
Chart	Position
Japanese Oricon Albums Chart	13

=== Year-end charts ===
Year	Chart	Position
1994	Japanese Albums Chart	52
1995	Japanese Albums Chart	37

== Certifications ==
Region	Certification	Certified units/sales
Japan (RIAJ)	4× Platinum	1,600,000^{^}
^{^} Shipments figures based on certification alone.
