= Kokyu =

Kokyu may refer to:

- Kokyū (Japanese: 胡弓), a traditional Japanese string instrument
- Kōkyū (Japanese: 後宮), the section of the Japanese Imperial Palace called the Dairi (内裏) where the Imperial Family and court ladies lived
- Kokyū (album) (Japanese: 呼吸), the debut album of Lily Chou-Chou
