= Kuwano =

Kuwano (written: 桑野) is a Japanese surname. Notable people with the surname include:

- Hijiri Kuwano (桑野 聖, born 1964), Japanese violinist, composer and arranger
- Michiko Kuwano (桑野 通子, 1915–1946), Japanese actress
- Nobuyoshi Kuwano (桑野 信義, born 1957), Japanese television performer

== See also ==
- 6867 Kuwano, a main-belt asteroid
- Kuwano Station, a railway station in Anan, Tokushima Prefecture, Japan
