= Kokyū (album) =

Soundtrack album by Lily Chou-Chou
- Released: October 17, 2001
- Recorded: 2000
- Genre: J-pop; indie pop; ethereal wave
- Length: 38:57
- Label: Toshiba EMI
- Producer: Takeshi Kobayashi

Salyu albums chronology
Kokyū (2001)	Landmark (2005)

Singles from Kokyū
- 1. "Glide" Released: April 19, 2000; 2. "Kyōmei (Kūkyo na Ishi)" Released: June 21, 2000; 3. "Tobenai Tsubasa" Released: 2001 (promotional single)

Kokyū (呼吸, "Breath") is the debut album of Lily Chou-Chou, a then-fictional musician created for the 2001 Shunji Iwai film All About Lily Chou-Chou. It was released on October 17, 2001, a week and a half after the film's release in Japan.

== Track listing ==
No.	Title	Lyrics	Music	Length
1.	"Arabesque" (アラベスク Arabesuku)	Shunji Iwai, Miho Omasu	Takeshi Kobayashi	5:50
2.	"Ai no Jikken" (愛の実験 "Experiment of Love")	Kobayashi	Kobayashi	5:26
3.	"Erotic" (エロティック Erotikku)	Kobayashi	Kobayashi	4:47
4.	"Hikōsen" (飛行船 "Blimp")	Kobayashi	Kobayashi	3:06
5.	"Kaifuku Suru Kizu" (回復する傷 "Healing Wounds")		Kobayashi	3:03
6.	"Hōwa" (飽和 "Saturation")	Kobayashi	Kobayashi	3:52
7.	"Tobenai Tsubasa" (飛べない翼 "Flightless Wings")	Iwai, Kobayashi	Kobayashi	4:47
8.	"Kyōmei (Kūkyo na Ishi)" (共鳴（空虚な石） "Resonance (Empty Stone)")	Kobayashi	Kobayashi	4:22
9.	"Glide" (グライド Guraido)	Kobayashi, Yuko Saegusa	Kobayashi	3:40
Total length:				38:57

== Chart rankings ==
Chart (2001)	Peak position
Oricon weekly albums	60

=== Reported sales ===
Chart	Amount
Oricon physical sales	3,700

== Release history ==
Region	Date	Format	Distributing Label
Japan	October 17, 2001	CD	Toshiba EMI
Japan	November 26, 2008	CD	Avex Marketing
