= Love Letter (1995 film) =

1995 Japanese film by Shunji Iwai

- Film poster
- Directed by: Shunji Iwai
- Written by: Shunji Iwai
- Produced by: Shūji Abe; Tomoki Ikeda; Jiro Komaki; Masahiko Nagasawa
- Starring: Miho Nakayama; Etsushi Toyokawa; Bunjaku Han; Miki Sakai; Takashi Kashiwabara; Ranran Suzuki
- Cinematography: Noboru Shinoda
- Edited by: Shunji Iwai
- Music by: Remedios
- Production companies: Fuji Television; Robot Communications
- Distributed by: Nippon Herald Film
- Release date: 25 March 1995 (Japan)
- Running time: 117 minutes
- Country: Japan
- Language: Japanese
- Box office: $7.8 million

Love Letter (Japanese: ラブレター, Hepburn: Rabu retā) is a 1995 Japanese romance film written, directed, and edited by Shunji Iwai in his feature film debut and starring Miho Nakayama in a dual role. Originally planned as a black and white television drama, it was turned into a film production.

Piracy made Love Letter popular in South Korea before its theatrical release. It was the highest-grossing non-animated Japanese film in South Korea until the release of Even If This Love Disappears From the World Tonight (2022).

== Plot ==
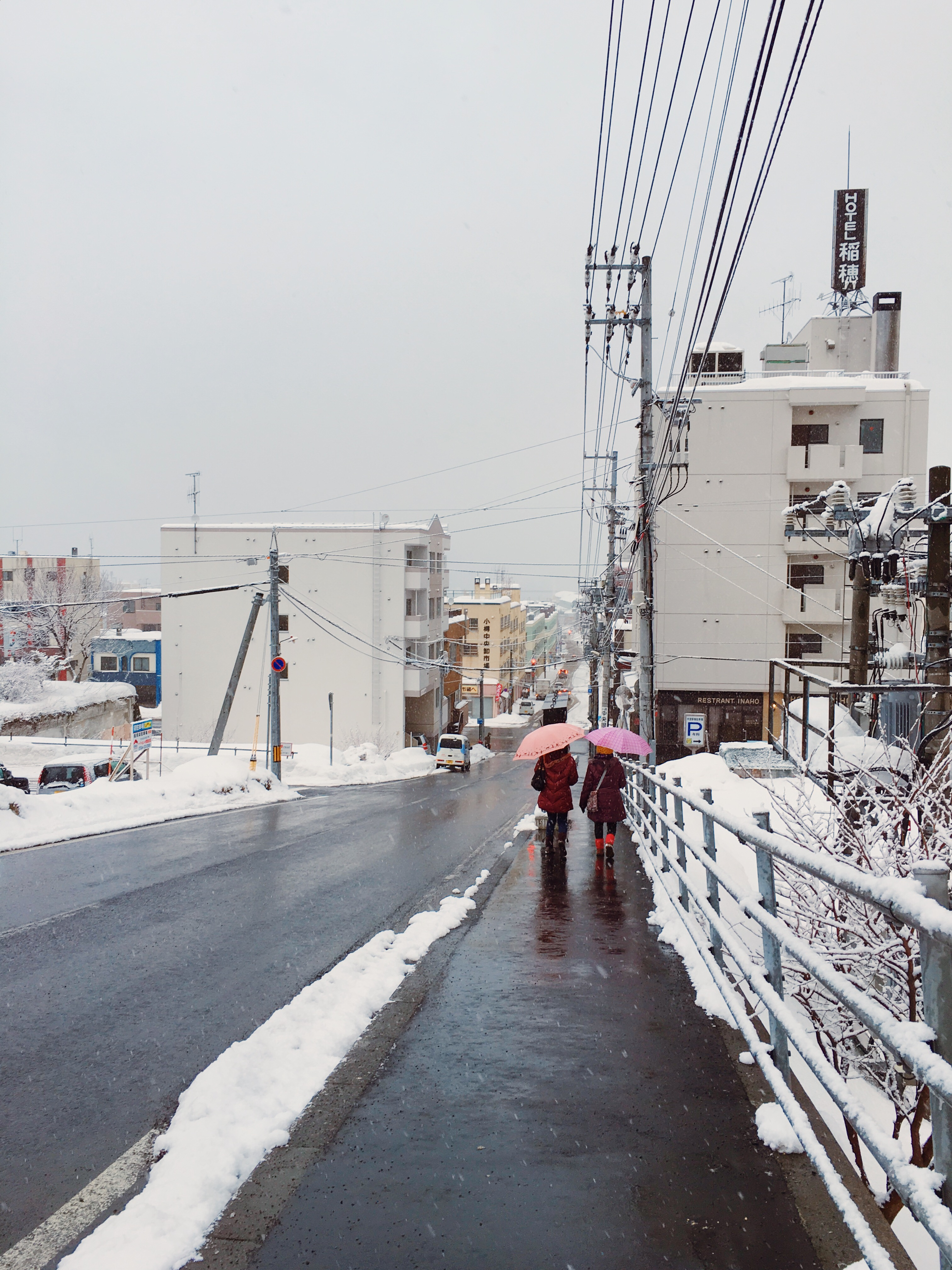
The street of Otaru where Shunji Iwai shot Love Letter.

Hiroko Watanabe, living in Kobe, loses her fiancé, Itsuki Fujii, in a mountain climbing accident. Two years later, on the day of Itsuki's memorial ceremony, Hiroko looks through his high school yearbook and finds an address under his name in the city of Otaru. She sends a letter to him at the old address and receives a reply from a woman named Itsuki Fujii, who bears a striking resemblance to Hiroko. The movie alternates between Hiroko and Female Itsuki as they exchange letters.

Female Itsuki, who works at the public library, is suffering from a persistent cold but refuses to seek medical help. It is revealed that her father died of pneumonia when she was in high school. Hiroko visits her friend Akiba and shows him the letter, believing it to be a message from heaven. Akiba confesses his feelings for Hiroko and encourages her to let go of Itsuki. Hiroko continues writing to Itsuki, learning over the course of several epistolary exchanges that her correspondent is a woman who as an adolescent attended the same school, in the same class, as her former fiancé, a situation that prompted incessant teasing by classmates and led to the Itsukis sharing the duty of looking after the school library.

To uncover the truth and help Hiroko move on, Akiba and Hiroko travel to Otaru, Female Itsuki's hometown. However, at the very moment they arrive, Female Itsuki is tricked into going to the hospital, where she falls asleep and has a dream about her father's death. Meanwhile, Hiroko and Akiba wait outside Female Itsuki's home, where Hiroko finally decides to leave a letter instead of waiting any longer. In a magical scene, as the travelers make their way out of town, Itsuki, having read the letter, passes them by on her bicycle, only to be hailed by Hiroko. She stops and turns, a crowd of pedestrians intervenes, and the two women are separated, never to meet.

Back home, Hiroko realizes that there were two Itsuki Fujiis and asks Female Itsuki to share her high school memories of Itsuki. She has come to believe, plaintively, that her striking resemblance to the librarian accounts for the feelings her fiancé had for her.

Flashbacks reveal that Male Itsuki was a shy and peculiar boy, anything but a Romeo. Among his pastimes during the hours spent in the school library was borrowing, using the old slips pocketed in the backs of library books that bore the borrower's names and the book's due date, as many books never previously checked out as he could find. During her mourning period for her father, Female Itsuki is visited by Male Itsuki, who asks her to return a book for him. After her return to school, she discovers that Male Itsuki has transferred, and she will never see him again.

Female Itsuki visits her old school and learns that Male Itsuki died in a mountain-climbing accident two years earlier. Hiroko and Akiba visit the mountain where Itsuki died, sharing their memories of him. Meanwhile, Female Itsuki collapses from a fever: her neglected cold has turned into pneumonia, mirroring her father's fate. Her mother and grandfather brave a snowstorm to get her to the hospital just in time.

In the mountains, Akiba wakes Hiroko to watch the sunrise and points to the distant peak where Itsuki died, calling out playfully to his old climbing companion. Hiroko cries out to Itsuki, using the same standard greeting penned in her first letter: "Are you okay? I'm doing well." She repeats her cry over and over. Meanwhile, Female Itsuki wakes up in the hospital, murmuring the same words.

Some time later, Hiroko and Itsuki continue their correspondence. Itsuki receives a visit from volunteer girls from her former high school library, who show her the book Male Itsuki had given her to return. They discover his name on the checkout card and, on the back, find a sketch he made of Female Itsuki. She weeps. After setting down on her word processor a long description of the episode, Female Itsuki decides not to send the letter.

== Cast ==
- Miho Nakayama as Itsuki Fujii and Hiroko Watanabe
- Etsushi Toyokawa as Akiba Shigeru
- Bunjaku Han as female Itsuki Fujii's mother
- Katsuyuki Shinohara as female Itsuki Fujii's grandfather
- Miki Sakai as Itsuki Fujii as a young girl
- Takashi Kashiwabara as male Itsuki Fujii
- Mariko Kaga as Yasuyo Fujii
- Keiichi Suzuki as Seichii Fujii
- Tomorowo Taguchi as Shinkichi Fujii
- Ranran Suzuki as Sanae Oikawa
- Kumi Nakamura as Ms. Hamaguchi
- Sansei Shiomi as Kajioyaji
- Ken Mitsuishi as Abe Kasuga
- Hirokazu Umeda as Toshimitsu
- Emiko Osada as Harumi
- Kaori Oguri as Suzumi
- Toshiya Sakai as driver
- Hajime Yamazaki as grade head
- Hiroshi Kanbe as Haruo
- Sumi Mutoh as nurse
- Chika Fujimura as Library Committee Member Haruka
- Mie Hayashi as Library Committee Member Mari
- Yu Takahara as Library Committee Member Yuko
- Yu Tokui as additional cast

== Production ==
=== Development ===
Iwai intended for Love Letter to be a TV drama shot in black and white and believed that Swallowtail Butterfly (1996) would be his feature film debut. However, the television production halted and a producer suggested that Love Letter be turned into a film. The television version did not feature Hiroko Watanabe and ended with Itsuki Fujii getting married. Robot Communications and Fuji Television produced Love Letter; this was the first film produced by Robot Communications.

Jack Finney's short story Love Letter (1959) and the films 84 Charing Cross Road (1987) and The Double Life of Veronique (1991) were inspirations for Iwai.

Miho Nakayama played a dual role. Iwai selected Nakayama due to her distinct public and private life as an idol and actress emulated Itsuki and Hiroko. Her previous comedic performances made her "perfect for the spirited Itsuki" according to Iwai, but he was shocked to learn how reserved and quiet Nakayama was.

=== Filming ===
Akiba being a glassblower was incorporated into the film after Iwai saw a glassblowing studio during location scouting in Otaru. The Saka Villa in Otaru was used as a filming location and later became a popular tourist attraction. Filming was done from October to December using VistaVision.

Love Letter was the first collaboration between Iwai and cinematographer Noboru Shinoda; they worked together on Picnic (1996) and All About Lily Chou-Chou (2001). The film was shot using ultra-wide frames.

== Release ==
Love Letter was released by Nippon Herald Films on 25 March 1995, and premiered in five theatres in Tokyo. It was shown at the Cine-Art theatre in Hong Kong for 204 days. Fine Line Features released the film in the United States under the title When I Close My Eyes.

Studio 2.0 acquired the distribution rights for South Korea. The company only wanted to purchase the rights to Love Letter, but the film was sold as a package with Postman Blues (1997), Welcome Back, Mr. McDonald (1997), April Story (1998). Love Letter was released in South Korea on 20 November 1999. Iwai was confused by its popularity in South Korea. Popularity spread due to piracy in South Korea and it was well-known before its theatrical release; over 300,000 pirated copies were distributed. Iwai was impressed when almost the entire audience for his film April Story (1998) at the Busan International Film Festival in 1998 said they saw Love Letter despite the film not being released there yet. Love Letter was re-released in South Korea for its 30th anniversary.

Fuji Television and Iwai oversaw a 4K remaster of the original 35mm camera negative. The 4K remaster was theatrically released on 4 April 2025, and was released on DVD and Blu-ray on 3 December.

== Reception ==
=== Box office ===
Love Letter has earned $7.8 million during its theatrical release and re-releases. The releases in China have earned 75.35 million yuan as of 2025; the 2021 re-release earned 65.2 million yuan.

In Seoul there were over 645,000 admissions and it was among the ten highest-grossing films in the country. It was the highest-grossing non-animated Japanese film in South Korea until Even If This Love Disappears From the World Tonight (2022). Over one million people in South Korea have seen the film.

=== Critical ===
Tun Shwe, writing for Midnight Eye, praised Iwai's usage of an scoped aspect ratio and noted that it gave the environment a dreamlike appearance. David Stratton praised the cinematography and performances in his review for Variety and noted that the literary underpinnings uplifted the drama.

Stephen Holden, writing for The New York Times, was unimpressed by the visuals and felt that the runtime resulted in the film meandering. Kevin Thomas wrote that the film was "tedious and contrived" in his review for the Los Angeles Times and felt that it was emotionally manipulative. Charles Britton, writing for the Daily Breeze, praised the photography, but felt that the film failed to make a point.

Rick Hong, writing for Film Threat, noted that a romantic feeling was created by the soft lenses used for filming and compared it to The Killer (1989) due to the use of the score to create character relationships.

== Accolades ==
| Award | Date of ceremony | Category | Recipient(s) | Result | Ref. |
|---|---|---|---|---|---|
| Blue Ribbon Awards | | Best Actress | Miho Nakayama | Won | |
| Hochi Film Awards | | Best Actress | Miho Nakayama | Won | |
| Yokohama Film Festival | | Best Film | Love Letter | Won | |
| Yokohama Film Festival | | Best Director | Shunji Iwai | Won | |
| Yokohama Film Festival | | Best Actor | Etsushi Toyokawa | Won | |
| Yokohama Film Festival | | Best Actress | Miho Nakayama | Won | |
| Yokohama Film Festival | | Best Cinematography | Noboru Shinoda | Won | |
| Yokohama Film Festival | | Best New Actress | Miki Sakai | Won | |
| 19th Japan Academy Film Prize | 1996 | Newcomer of the Year | Love Letter | Won | |
| 19th Japan Academy Film Prize | 1996 | Love Letter | Miki Sakai | Lost | |
| 19th Japan Academy Film Prize | 1996 | Best Film | Love Letter | Lost | |
| Kinema Junpo | 1996 | Kinema Junpo Award for Best Film of the Year | Love Letter | Won | |

== Adaptations ==
Multiple offers were made to remake Love Letter, but none were produced. In 2015, it was announced that Love Letter would be remade into a Korean drama. A musical adaptation starring Kim Ji-hyun and Kwak Sun-young premiered in South Korea in 2014. A Chinese remake of Love Letter directed by Liu Yulin and written by Wang Hui-ling was announced in 2019; Nakayama was meant to appear in the film, but she died in 2024. In 2026, Iwai stated that he did not know how a remake could be done due to instant communication.

Moonlit Winter (2019) was compared to Love Letter.

== Works cited ==
=== Journals ===
- Choi, Jinhee (2010). "China Inc., Limited". Cinema Journal. 49 (3). University of Texas Press: 144–149. doi:10.2307/40800748. JSTOR 40800748.

=== News ===
- "经典爱情电影依旧畅销". Qilu Evening News. 23 May 2025. Archived from the original on 10 August 2026.
- "映画「ラブレター」ロケ地 小樽の旧坂別邸が全焼". Sankei Digital. 27 May 2007. Archived from the original on 7 December 2007.
- "中山美穂が「Love Letter」の中国版リメイク作に出演". Natalie. 4 July 2019. Archived from the original on 15 August 2024.
- "岩井俊二監督、中山美穂主演「Love Letter」公開30周年記念で4Kリマスター上映". Natalie. 11 March 2025. Archived from the original on 7 February 2026.
- "中山美穂×岩井俊二「Love Letter」4Kリマスター版がソフト化、サントラも復刻". Natalie. 28 September 2025. Archived from the original on 28 September 2025.
- "日本映画『ラブレター』、韓国でドラマとしてリメーク". JoongAng Ilbo. 27 January 2015. Archived from the original on 9 August 2026.
- Britton, Charles (10 July 1998). "'Eyes' has beauty, but point is hard to see". Daily Breeze. p. K6 – via Newspapers.com.
- Byung-yeul, Baek (11 January 2025). "'Love Letter' reclaims Korean hearts after lead actor's passing". The Korea Times. Archived from the original on 9 August 2026.
- Dhar, Debanjan (4 June 2026). "Shunji Iwai Interview On Love Letter's Restoration, Nostalgia and The Scrapped Ozu Parody". Outlook. Archived from the original on 28 June 2026.
- Ewe, Koh (6 December 2024). "Japanese star Miho Nakayama found dead at 54". BBC. Archived from the original on 11 February 2025.
- Georgiades, Luke (29 April 2025). "Shunji Iwai on 30 years of filmmaking: "I'm still chasing after my younger self's vision."". A Rabbit's Foot. Archived from the original on 12 April 2026.
- Holden, Stephen (12 June 1998). "'When I Close My Eyes': An Intriguing Evocation of Grief". The New York Times. Archived from the original on 12 December 2024.
- Hong, Rick (4 June 2026). "Love Letter". Film Threat. Archived from the original on 5 June 2026.
- Kim, Soo-kyung (6 April 2006). "한국 영화시장의 일본영화 중간점검". Cine21. Archived from the original on 17 August 2026.
- Kim, Kyung Chul (2 July 2025). "長期低迷がつづく韓国映画界で圧倒的人気…！中山美穂が主演した大反響「名画」". Shūkan Gendai. pp. 1–4. Archived from the original on 11 August 2026.
- Lee, Jae-hoon (28 October 2014). "뮤지컬 '러브레터', 영화 원작과 무엇이 다를까". Newsis. Archived from the original on 10 August 2026.
- Lee, Edmund (14 March 2016). "Love Letter director Shunji Iwai on his long road back to feature-film making". South China Morning Post. Archived from the original on 9 August 2026.
- Lu, Jiahong (2 June 2025). "日本电影《情书》30年后在中国院线首映受追捧，中国影业"怀旧经济"方兴未艾". BBC. Archived from the original on 27 February 2026.
- Obe, Toshiya (30 October 2020). "韓国は第二の故郷、岩井俊二さん「ラヴレター」からの縁". The Asahi Shimbun. Archived from the original on 9 August 2026.
- Potenza, Tori (5 June 2026). "Shunji Iwai's Love Letter". The Brooklyn Rail. Archived from the original on 11 July 2026.
- Saito, Stephen (3 June 2026). "Shunji Iwai on Rewriting Cinematic Language with "Love Letter"". The Moveable Fest. Archived from the original on 9 August 2026.
- Saito, Sumiko (29 January 2023). "「セカコイ」 韓国で観客１００万人突破＝日本実写映画２１年ぶり". Yonhap News Agency. Archived from the original on 9 August 2026.
- Sim, Mi-seong (23 November 2019). "할리우드판 <살인의 추억>? 쌍둥이처럼 닮은 영화들". Cine21. Archived from the original on 17 August 2026.
- Stratton, David (11 September 1995). "Love Letter". Variety. Archived from the original on 9 August 2026.
- Thomas, Kevin (10 July 1998). "'My Eyes': A Lamentable Tear-Jerker". Los Angeles Times. Archived from the original on 9 August 2026.

=== Web ===
- ""日本映画の変革者ROBOT 制作会社ロボットの挑戦" 『Love Letter』／『幕が上がる』上映会". Sapporo Art Magazine. Archived from the original on 10 August 2026.
- "1999". KoreanFilm. Archived from the original on 3 August 2026.
- "Awards & Festivals Love Letter". Mubi. Archived from the original on 9 August 2026.
- "Love Letter". Metrograph. Archived from the original on 9 August 2026.
- "Love Letter (1995)". Box Office Mojo.
- "Love Letter (1995) ラブレター". Agency for Cultural Affairs. Archived from the original on 5 December 2015.
- "Love Letter (4K Restoration)". Roxie Theater. Archived from the original on 18 July 2026.
- Shwe, Tun (1 August 2002). "Love Letter". Midnight Eye. Archived from the original on 9 August 2026.
