= Go Jibiki =

Japanese actor

Go Jibiki (Japanese: 地曵豪, Hepburn: Jibiki Gō) is a Japanese actor.

== Biography ==
Go Jibiki is a Japanese actor. He was born in Tokyo, Japan. Because of his father's business, he spend his early life in Singapore (1983–86) and the United States, New York (1986–89). This is the reason why he speaks English fluently.

After coming back to Japan, he started to learn acting. He joined the theatrical company "Wakakusa" at the age of 14. (He left the company at the age of 16)

His first screen role was "April Story(Shigatsu monogatari)"directed by Japanese movie director Shunji Iwai in 1998. After graduation from the Gakushuin university, he again decided to learn acting. He entered acting school "En", and graduated the school in 2001.

In 2007 he met Japanese movie director, Kōji Wakamatsu. He done 5movies with Kōji Wakamatsu, including "United Red Army". In this movie, he played Tsuneo Mori, the leader of United Red Army. And the movie won C.I.C.A.E Prizes (the International Confederation of Art House Cinemas) and NETPAC Prize (Network for the Promotion of Asian Cinema) in the 58th Berlin International Film Festival.

His special abilities are Iaijutsu. Iaijutsu is a Japanese ancient martial art, also known as combative quick-draw sword technique. He had been training Iaijutsu from master Tetsuzan Kuroda for more than 20 years.

== Filmography ==
- April Story, directed by Shunji Iwai (1998)
- The Choice of Hercules, directed by Masato Harada (2002)
- United Red Army, directed by Kōji Wakamatsu (2008)
- Caterpillar, directed by Kōji Wakamatsu (2008)
- 11:25 The Day He Chose His Own Fate, directed by Kōji Wakamatsu (2012)
- Petrel Hotel Blue, directed by Kōji Wakamatsu (2012)
- The Millennial Rapture, directed by Kōji Wakamatsu (2012)
- Yurusarezaru Mono, directed by Lee Sang-il (2013)
- Twisted Justice, directed by Kazuya Shiraishi (2016)
- A Bride for Rip Van Winkle, directed by Shunji Iwai (2016)
- That Disappearance, directed by Hiro Kano (2022)
- Ravens, directed by Mark Gill (2024)
