= Kaori Oguri =

Japanese actress (born 1970)

- Born: 14 September 1970 (age 56)
- Occupation: actress

Kaori Oguri (小栗香織 Oguri Kaori; born 14 September 1970 in Chigasaki, Kanagawa) is a Japanese actress.

She first became known as a model for Japanese show 11PM, and decided she wanted to be an actress after meeting her then-idol Kaori Momoi at 11PM. She is best known for her role in 1995 film Love Letter. She was also active in Gravure modeling and did nude photoshoots.

She was also a singer, and sang songs in genres including bossa nova and Hawaiian music. She stopped singing in 1997, upon which she left the spotlight, but in 2023 returned to singing with love song "Yorisotte". She released a photobook in 2024 sharing photos from her late teens and twenties.

As of 2026, she was producing a gravure project focused on older women. Models included First Summer Uika, Miyuu Yamamoto, and Ayako Fuji.

== Personal life ==
She was diagnosed with breast cancer at 45, and underwent surgery in 2016.

She married a South Korean man, but struggled with learning the customs and clashed with her husband about their child. She stated that "even when I tried to explain, he wouldn't understand". They divorced prior to 2022, and she mused that "our meeting was inevitable, and perhaps our parting was inevitable as well".
