= A Bride for Rip Van Winkle =

- Japanese theatrical release poster

Japanese name
- Kanji: リップヴァンウィンクルの花嫁
Transcriptions
- Revised Hepburn: Rippu Van Winkuru no hanayome
- Directed by: Shunji Iwai
- Written by: Shunji Iwai
- Based on: A Bride for Rip Van Winkle by Shunji Iwai
- Produced by: Shunji Iwai; Tomoyuki Miyagawa; Aki Mizuno; Muneyuki Kii
- Starring: Haru Kuroki; Gō Ayano; Cocco
- Cinematography: Chigi Kanbe
- Edited by: Shunji Iwai
- Music by: Mako Kuwabara
- Production company: Rockwell Eyes
- Distributed by: Toei Company; Eleven Arts
- Release dates: March 8, 2016 (Hong Kong).; March 26, 2016 (Japan)
- Running time: 179 minutes
- Country: Japan
- Language: Japanese

A Bride for Rip Van Winkle (Japanese: リップヴァンウィンクルの花嫁, Hepburn: Rippu Van Winkuru no hanayome) is a 2016 Japanese drama film written, directed, edited and co-produced by Shunji Iwai, based on his novel of the same name.

== Synopsis ==
Nanami is an apathetic, part-time junior high school teacher, whose only solace comes from connecting with others on "Planet", a new social networking service. One day, a young man named Tetsuya messages her and asks to meet in person. The two begin dating and quickly become engaged.

Nanami's parents meet Tetsuya's, though Nanami's parents are actually divorced, they pretend to be together for the sake of harmony. Nanami, underconfident, and quiet, loses her job as a teacher and decides to quit to be a housewife for Tetsuya. As the wedding plans progress, Nanami can only get 2 family members to attend the wedding, and Tetsuya begs Nanami to increase her guest list for the wedding, as he thinks the wedding will look strange being all his family. Nanami is desperate so reaches out to her online friend, Amuro, a self-proclaimed jack-of-all-trades, who runs a business (amongst others) that hires actors for weddings. He hires actors to play Nanami's guests on her big day.

As she gets used to married life, she finds her husband despondent and seems to lack interest. Nanami then finds an earring in her flat. She thinks he is having an affair. She contacts Amuro to find out what is going on, who promises to investigate for a fee. However, at the same time, a man contacts Nanami saying he is the partner of the woman that Tetsuya is having the affair with. He convinces Nanami to meet him in a hotel room and then tries to seduce her. Nanami flees to the bathroom and calls Amuro for help, who turns up. It is revealed that the man is an actor, working for Amuro.

A few weeks following the ceremony, Tetsuya's mother confronts Nanami with allegations of lying and cheating, and has also found out Nanami's parents are divorced. She has been sent a video of Nanami with the man acting as the cheating girl's partner in the hotel room. Nanami in turn tells her of Tetsuya's cheating, and then talks to Tetsuya. Tetsuya seems to be unaware of the cheating, even when Nanami mentions the name of the girl, as she was told by his partner. Tetsuya gets angry and splits with her.

Heartbroken and depressed, Nanami checks herself into a hotel and manages to get hired there as a maid. Amuro contacts Nanami and asks her to help out by acting as a family member for another wedding. She joins a fake family of actors, one of whom is actress Mashiro, who she goes drinking with. One day, Amuro offers Nanami a housekeeping job in an old mansion, and she finds Mashiro is the other maid. Mashiro's sole resident's infectious spirit helps Nanami to open her heart. However, Nanami soon realizes that Amuro, the mansion, and Mashiro aren't what they seem - and even dreams have limits.

== Cast ==
- Haru Kuroki as Nanami Minagawa
- Gō Ayano as Yukimasu Amuro
- Cocco as Mashiro Satonaka
- Go Jibiki as Tetsuya
- Hideko Hara
- Soko Wada
- Tomoko Mariya
- Akio Kaneda
- Lily

== Release ==
After the film had its world premiere in Hong Kong on March 8, 2016, A Bride for Rip Van Winkle was released in Taiwan on March 11, 2016 and in Hong Kong on March 17, 2016, ahead of its release in Japan on March 26, 2016. The film was released in the United States on November 10, 2017

A Bride for Rip Van Winkle was an official selection of numerous international film festivals:

- 2016 Seattle International Film Festival
- 2016 New York Asian Film Festival
- 2016 Shanghai International Film Festival
- 2016 Fantasia International Film Festival
- 2016 Tokyo International Film Festival
- 2016 Hawaii International Film Festival
- 2017 International Film Festival Rotterdam

=== Versions ===
Two versions of A Bride for Rip Van Winkle were available for theatrical release, a 179-minute "director's cut" and a 119-minute theatrical version. Only the longer version was released in Japan, while both versions were available selectively for international release. Both versions were released in Hong Kong, whereas only the director's cut was released in the United States.

The film's story was also broadcast as a four-and-a-half-hour, six-episode television series ("serial edition") on the Japanese SKY PerfecTV! service's BS SKY PerfecTV! channel. While retaining the same story and plot, this television series is an alternate version of the film, with extensions for some scenes added and some scenes removed.

Iwai prefers the longer theatrical version, though he has stated that it is "not perfect. Even the TV version, the longest, isn't perfect because it doesn't have a very, very important scene in the climax. You can only see that in the three-hour version."

== Accolades ==
- 2016 41st Hochi Film Award
  - Gō Ayano - Best Supporting Actor (winner)
- 2017 31st Takasaki Film Festival
  - Lily - Best Supporting Actress (winner)
- 2017 Kinema Junpo
  - Best 10 Japanese Movies of 2016 (ranked 6th)
- 2017 38th Yokohama Film Festival
  - Best 10 Japanese Movies of 2016 (runner-up)
- 2017 71st Mainichi Film Awards
  - Haru Kuroki - Best Actress (nominated)
- 59th Blue Ribbon Awards
  - Best Film (nominated)
  - Haru Kuroki - Best Actress (nominated)
  - Gō Ayano - Best Supporting Actor (nominated)
  - Shunji Iwai - Best Director (nominated)
- 2017 40th Japan Academy Prize
  - Haru Kuroki - Outstanding Performance by an Actress in a Leading Role (nominated)
- 2017 11th Asian Film Awards
  - Haru Kuroki - Best Actress (nominated)
  - Kyôko Heya - Best Production Design (nominated)
