= Terminal (Salyu album) =

Studio album by Salyu
- Released: January 17, 2007
- Recorded: 2005–2006
- Genre: Pop, pop-rock, alternative rock
- Length: 71:46
- Language: Japanese
- Label: Toy's Factory
- Producer: Takeshi Kobayashi

Salyu chronology
Landmark (2005)	Terminal (2007)	Merkmal (2008)

Singles from Terminal
- 1. "Kaze ni Noru Fune" Released: October 26, 2005; 2. "Tower" Released: April 5, 2006; 3. "Name" Released: September 6, 2006; 4. "Platform" Released: November 1, 2006

Terminal (stylised as TERMINAL) is Japanese singer Salyu's second original album, released on January 17, 2007. It is currently her most commercially successful album, peaking at number 2 on Oricon's album charts, and is her only album to receive a gold certification from the RIAJ. The recording sessions for the album ended on December 1, 2006.

== Track listing ==
No.	Title	Lyrics	Music	Length
1.	"Tobira" (トビラ "Door")	Takeshi Kobayashi	Kobayashi	5:39
2.	"Kaze ni Noru Fune" (風に乗る船 "Ship Sailing in the Breeze")	Kobayashi	Kobayashi	5:06
3.	"Kagami" (鏡 "Mirror")	Kobayashi	Kobayashi	5:19
4.	"Platform (Merry Go Round)" (プラットホーム ～Ｍｅｒｒｙ Ｇｏ Ｒｏｕｎｄ～ Purattohōmu)	Kobayashi	Kobayashi	5:10
5.	"Yue ni" (故に "Therefore")	Yo Hitoto	Kobayashi	4:51
6.	"Tower"	Hitoto	Kobayashi	4:58
7.	"Apple Pie"	Hitoto	Kobayashi	5:52
8.	"I Believe"	Salyu	Kobayashi	5:15
9.	"Yoru no Umi Tōi Deai ni" (夜の海 遠い出会いに "The Night Sea, in a Far Off Meeting")	Kobayashi	Kobayashi	5:17
10.	"Name"	Hitoto	Kobayashi	5:14
11.	"Be There"	Hitoto	Kobayashi	5:05
12.	"Heartquake"	Hitoto	Kobayashi	5:46
13.	"To U (Salyu Ver.)"	Kazutoshi Sakurai	Kobayashi	8:14
Total length:				1:11:46

== Charts ==
Chart (2010)	Peak position
Oricon daily albums	2
Oricon weekly albums	2

== Sales and certifications ==
Chart	Amount
Oricon physical sales	87,000
RIAJ physical shipping certification	Gold (100,000+)

== Release history ==
Region	Date	Format	Distributing Label
Japan	January 17, 2007	CD, digital download	Toy's Factory
Japan	March 1, 2007	Rental CD	Toy's Factory
