= Friends After 3.11 =

2011 Japanese documentary film

- Directed by: Shunji Iwai
- Starring: Miyuki Matsuda; Kokoro Fujinami
- Country of origin: Japan
- Original language: Japanese

Production
- Producer: Miho Harada
- Cinematography: Chigi Kanbe; Shinichi Tsunoda
- Editors: Daisuke Imai; Shunji Iwai; Yoshiki Ushiroda
- Running time: 120 minutes
- Production companies: Asahi Newstar; Rockwell Eyes

Original release
- Release: 1 October 2011

Friends After 3.11 is a 2011 Japanese documentary film directed and co-edited by Shunji Iwai. The film explores the aftermath of the 2011 Tōhoku earthquake and tsunami, featuring actress Miyuki Matsuda and anti-nuclear activist Kokoro Fujinami.

== Release ==
Friends After 3.11 premiered on television, being broadcast on SKY PerfecTV! on 1 October 2011.

On 15 February 2012, the film screened at the 62nd Berlin International Film Festival. A "theatrical version" of the film was released at Auditorium Shibuya in Tokyo, Japan, on 10 March 2012.

== Reception ==
Fionnuala Halligan, in her review of the film for Screen Daily, wrote: "As the title suggests, Shunji Iwai focuses on his friends in this documentary, and it is hampered by his inability to cut their testimonies short across lengthy and often repetitive interviews. Despite this, however, this is a cumulatively affecting film and an intriguing insight into the Japanese mindset on what is becoming a growing struggle within the country."
