= Salyu =

- サリュ
- Born: Ayako Mori (森綾子, Mori Ayako); 13 October 1980 (age 46)
- Occupation: Singer
- Children: 1
- Musical career
- Genres: J-pop; alternative; experimental; electronica; folk
- Years active: 2000–present
- Label: Toy's Factory
- Website: salyu.jp

Ayako Mori (森綾子, Mori Ayako; born 13 October 1980), known professionally as Salyu (サリュ, Saryu) is a Japanese singer, produced by Takeshi Kobayashi. She debuted in 2000 as the fictional singer Lily Chou-Chou for the film All About Lily Chou-Chou, and later debuted as a solo artist in 2004. She is best known for her charity single collaboration with Bank Band in 2006, "To U." Salyu has also worked as a voice actress for the Japanese-language version of the game Professor Layton and the Diabolical Box (2007), in which she voiced the character Mrs. Rose (ローズ夫人, Rōzu Fujin) (known as Babette in the English version). In 2011, Salyu embarked on a new solo project going by the name salyu × salyu (サリュ バイ サリュ, Saryu Bai Saryu).

== Career ==
Salyu learnt piano from a young age, however abruptly stopped these lessons in junior high school. Salyu began singing in elementary school after contracting pneumonia. On advice by her doctor to regain her lung strength, she was enrolled into a choir.

In 1998, while attending high school in outer Tokyo, Salyu was inspired to become a singer after watching a friend performing at a live house. Salyu auditioned in high school for a Sony musician audition and was accepted, later attending a Sony music training facility. Music producer Takeshi Kobayashi happened by chance to see a talking/singing audition video of Salyu, and 30 seconds into the tape, he was so impressed that he decided to meet her the next day. Kobayashi decided to work with her, and the pair soon began making demo tapes together. He gave her the stage name Salyu, which he chose as it was similar to the French greeting salut. Kobayashi was at the time preparing a soundtrack to Shunji Iwai's online novel and later film, All About Lily Chou-Chou. The novel and film centred around a fictional singer, Lily Chou-Chou, who began releasing actual music in 2000. The project was a collaboration between Iwai, Kobayashi and Salyu, as the vocalist for the project. This project allowed Salyu to perform on prominent music shows Hey! Hey! Hey! Music Champ and Music Station in June 2000.

After the release of the film in 2001, the group ceased to release music. Salyu began to perform concerts as a solo artist, performing on average once every two months due to her lack of self-confidence in her live performance skills. Kobayashi continued to work with her during this period, giving her music, and was the one who allowed her to debut as a singer in 2004. Her debut single was a collaboration with Ilmari from the hip-hop group Rip Slyme, called "Valon." Salyu later released a solo version of this song, "Valon-1," several months later. Salyu's second solo single "Dialogue" was awarded the Space Shower Best New Artist Video for 2004. After four singles, Salyu released her debut album Landmark in June 2005, which reached No. 22 on Oricon's weekly albums charts. Two days later, Salyu performed her first one-man live, at the Shibuya Club Quattro.

In 2006, Salyu reached a much greater audience through the Bank Band charity single "To U," in which she was a featured vocalist. The single was extremely successful, reaching number 2 on Oricon's single charts and being certified platinum. Her next singles "Name" and "Platform" (the film Metro ni Notte's theme song) were her first solo singles to chart in the top 20. Salyu's second studio album Terminal was her first top 10 release, charting at number 2.

Her 2007 singles "Liberty" and "Iris (Shiawase no Hako)" were her first works not to feature Kobayashi, instead were self-produced and co-written with Zentaro Watanabe. In late 2008, Salyu released her first greatest hits album, Merkmal, that marked 10 years since meeting Kobayashi. This was followed by her first performance at Budokan, during her tour for Merkmal. In 2009, Salyu's single "Corteo (Gyōretsu)/Halfway" became her first top 10 single. In 2010, Salyu released her third studio album, Maiden Voyage, which was her first self-produced album.

Salyu's fourth album, although the first as salyu × salyu, S(o)un(d)beams, was released in 2011. It is a special collaborative concept album with Cornelius, exploring to what extent Salyu's voice can be used as an instrument.

A fifth studio album, Photogenic, was released in 2012, followed by Android & Human Being in 2015.

== Musical approach ==
Salyu originally considered herself more of a vocalist as opposed to a musician, and early on in her career held a stance that she would be a singer who did not write her own material. She did not believe her compositions would be the best quality. In her first album, Landmark, all of the songs were written and produced by Takeshi Kobayashi. Her lyric contributions on the album were mostly suggestions for lyrics that could be better phrased. Salyu was encouraged through much of her career by other musicians to try to write her own music, however she mostly ignored the suggestions, until a musician told her it would let her understand her fellow musicians better.

She began branching into musicians other than Kobayashi in 2006, when musicians Yo Hitoto and Sarasa Ifu wrote lyrics to the songs on her "Tower" single. Her first song with her billed as the lyricist was "I Believe," from her 2007 album Terminal. Her 2007 singles "Liberty" and "Iris (Shiawase no Hako)" were her first works to be self-produced and her first singles to feature her own lyrics, though Salyu wrote the songs in collaboration with musicians Tatsuya Kokufu and Zentaro Watanabe. This was also the first time Salyu has not worked together with Kobayashi on a music release.

2010's Maiden Voyage was the first album of Salyu's to be self-produced. It featured predominately writing by Kobayashi, however six songs featured lyrics by her, two music by Salyu, and one, "L.A.F.S.," was arranged by Salyu.

== Personal life ==
Much of Salyu's personal information and history has not been revealed publicly. Her official website's profile, for example, only lists her musical releases and commercial tie-ups, as opposed to her background. However, she has revealed two personal facts about herself in her blog: her first name is Ayako (綾子) and that she has four siblings. Her older brother, Daisuke Mori (森大輔) was a former professional rugby union player, for the Toshiba Brave Lupus team.

Salyu announced that she had given birth to her first child, a daughter, on May 6, 2024. The identity of the father has not been disclosed to the public.

== Discography ==
=== Studio albums ===
- Landmark (2005)
- Terminal (2007)
- Maiden Voyage (2010)
- S(o)un(d)beams (2011)
- Photogenic (2012)
- Android & Human Being (2015)

=== Compilation albums ===
- Merkmal (2008)
