= Hijiri Kuwano =

Japanese musician

- 桑野聖
- Born: Japan
- Education: Tokyo University of the Arts
- Occupations: Violinist; composer; arranger
- Style: Classical; video game music; anime song

Hijiri Kuwano (桑野聖, Kuwano Hijiri; born February 12) is a Japanese violinist, composer and arranger.

Kuwano began taking violin lessons at age six and studied under Yonosuke Ishii, Shizuko Ishii and Chikashi Tanaka. While attending Tokyo University of the Arts, he performed as a guest concertmaster at Tokyo City Philharmonic Orchestra and Sendai Philharmonic Orchestra.

Before graduating from the university, he became interested in playing non-classical music and started performing with Toshihito Nakanishi, who inspired him in many ways. Kuwano also started a career as composer, when he produced an album published together with a photobook by Kenji Ishikawa, Moonlight Blue. Kuwano handled string arrangements for albums and movies for Kome Kome Club and began his career as arranger as well.

Kuwano worked on recordings, concerts with various artists, movies and video games as a soloist and as the "Hijiri Kuwano strings group". He is credited in Whisper of the Heart, Shall We Dance, Nobody Knows, Kind of Love, Melody of Oblivion, Good Luck Girl!, Final Fantasy XIII and numerous other productions as a performer, composer and arranger.

He is also known as the violin player in the battle theme "Blinded by Light" in Square Enix's Final Fantasy XIII (composed by Masashi Hamauzu). He works closely with Hamauzu and Imeruat (Masashi Hamauzu and Mina) as a supporting artist. He toured with Imeruat to Europe and Hong Kong and performed several pieces on "α" Clock: World Time, Sony Global website (composed by Masashi Hamauzu).

== Produced/co-produced albums ==
- Fiddler's Philosophy (東方聞弦録) – solo album
- "Moonlight Blue" (月光浴; Gekkōyoku) – concept album with the photographer Kenji Ishikawa
- "Melody of Oblivion" (忘却の旋律) – TBS animation soundtrack
- "Cinderella never sleeps" (シンデレラは眠らない) – Nippon TV drama soundtrack
- Cardfight!! Vanguard overDress (TV)
