= Landmark (Salyu album) =

landmark

Studio album by Salyu
- Released: June 15, 2005
- Genre: J-pop
- Label: Toy's Factory

Salyu chronology
Kokyuu (2001)	landmark (2005)	Terminal (2007)

landmark is Salyu's debut album. She previously released the album Kokyuu under the name Lily Chou-Chou.

== Track listing ==
1. "landmark"
2. "AI AMU" (アイアム; I Am)
3. "VALON-1"
4. "Niji No Saki" (虹の先; End Of The Rainbow)
5. "Peaty"
6. "Taion" (体温; Body Temperature)
7. "UEE" (ウエエ; Way)
8. "Dramatic Irony"
9. "Dialogue"
10. "Suisei" (彗星; Comet)
11. "Pop"
