= Last Letter (2020 film) =

2020 Japanese film

- Film poster
- Directed by: Shunji Iwai
- Screenplay by: Shunji Iwai
- Based on: Last Letter by Shunji Iwai
- Produced by: Aki Mizuno
- Starring: Takako Matsu; Suzu Hirose; Nana Mori; Hideaki Anno; Ryunosuke Kamiki; Masaharu Fukuyama
- Cinematography: Chigi Kanbe
- Edited by: Shunji Iwai
- Music by: Takeshi Kobayashi
- Production company: Toho
- Distributed by: Toho
- Release date: January 17, 2020 (Japan)
- Running time: 120 minutes
- Country: Japan
- Language: Japanese

Last Letter (Japanese: ラストレター, Hepburn: Rasuto Retā) is a 2020 Japanese romantic drama film written, directed and edited by Shunji Iwai, based on his own novel. It is Iwai's second film adaptation of the novel, following the 2018 Chinese film of the same name. The film stars Takako Matsu, Suzu Hirose, Nana Mori, Ryunosuke Kamiki, Hideaki Anno and Masaharu Fukuyama.

== Plot ==
A family attends the funeral of Misaki, and during the process, Misaki's sister Yuri, is handed the invite to a school reunion.

Yuri goes along to the reunion to tell them her sister has passed, but everyone assumes it is her and she can't bring herself to tell them otherwise.

While there, Kyoshiro Otosaka speaks to her, and gets her number, telling her that he was in love with her (assuming that she is her sister). They start exchanging letters, and it is revealed that he had a relationship with her, before it broke off and she went out with an abusive man, who fathered her daughter Ayumi. Otosoka became a novelist, and wrote a prize winning novel, Misaki, named after her.

He ends up meeting Yuri again, and then finally her daughters who take him to pay respects to Misaki, where Ayumi reveals the letters, and the chapters he would send were a source of support for Misaki during their bad times. Otosaka, who hasn't been able to write since, now feels he can and starts writing again.

== Cast ==
- Takako Matsu as Yuri Kishibeno
  - Nana Mori as young Yuri Kishibeno / Soyoka Kishibeno
- Masaharu Fukuyama as Kyoshiro Otosaka
  - Ryunosuke Kamiki as young Kyoshiro Otosaka
- Suzu Hirose as Ayumi Tono / young Misaki Tono
- Hideaki Anno as Sojiro Kishibeno
- Nagi Furuya as Eito Kishibeno
- Keiko Mizukoshi as Akiko Kishibeno
- Hitoshi Komura as Shojo Hatoba
- Keiichi Suzuki as Kokichi Tono
- Midori Kiuchi as Junko Tono
- Etsushi Toyokawa as Ato
- Miho Nakayama as Sakae

== Release ==
Last Letter was theatrically released in Japan by Toho on January 17, 2020.
