= April Story =

- Film poster
- Directed by: Shunji Iwai
- Written by: Shunji Iwai
- Produced by: Hidemi Satani
- Starring: Takako Matsu; Fujii Kahori; Tanabe Seiichi
- Cinematography: Noboru Shinoda
- Edited by: Shunji Iwai
- Music by: Shunji Iwai
- Distributed by: Rockwell Eyes
- Release date: March 14, 1998 (Japan)
- Running time: 67 minutes
- Country: Japan
- Language: Japanese

April Story (Japanese: 四月物語) is a 1998 Japanese film directed by Shunji Iwai starring Takako Matsu.

== Plot ==
Uzuki Nireno, a shy girl from Asahikawa, a city in northern Hokkaidō, leaves her family for Musashino University (a fictitious university sharing its name with Musashino University) in Tokyo. However, she finds herself lonely in the unfamiliar place. Soon, she befriends Saeko Sono, who prompts her to join the university's fishing club. The film shows a series of vignettes of her day to day life: She watches a fictionalized film about a failed assassination on Oda Nobunaga. In the theatre, a man tries sitting beside her, and she flees the theatre, leaving her books behind. She shares curry with her apartment neighbour. She bikes the city streets.

Reflecting on her intentions to attend Musashino University, she recalls the local boy from her high school she fell in love with, Yamazaki, and whom she followed to Tokyo. She finds the bookstore in which he works, Musashino-do, buying several books in hopes of interacting with him. One day, he finally recognizes her. Outside, the rain pours, and Yamazaki pulls out various umbrellas left behind by customers for her to use. She promises to him she'll return as she leaves.

== Cast ==
- Takako Matsu as Uzuki Nireno
- Seiichi Tanabe as Yamazaki
- Kaori Fujii as Teruko Kitao
- Rumi as Saeko Sono
- Kazuhiko Kato as The Man in the Art Gallery
- Go Jibiki
- Matsumoto Kōshirō IX as Uzuki's father
- Ichikawa Somegorō VII as Uzuki's brother
- Yōsuke Eguchi as Oda Nobunaga
- Tatsuya Ishii as Akechi Mitsuhide

== Crew ==
- Director/Writer/Editor/Composer: Shunji Iwai
- Director of Photography: Noboru Shinoda
- Lighting Director: Yuki Nakamura
- Production Designer: Yuji Tsuzuki

== DVD Editions ==
- Japanese R2 (No English Subtitles)
- Korean R3 (English Subtitles)
- Hong Kong R3 (Japanese dialogue, English / Full Chinese subtitles)

== Festivals ==
- Toronto International Film Festival, 1998
- Pusan International Film Festival, 1998

== Awards ==
- 1998 Pusan International Film Festival: PSB Award (Audience Award)
