= Lily Chou-Chou =

Japanese pop music group

- Also known as: Ç†
- Origin: Japan
- Genres: J-pop, dream pop
- Years active: 2000–2001, 2010–present
- Labels: Sony Japan; Toshiba EMI; Oorong-sha
- Members: Salyu; Takeshi Kobayashi; Yukio Nagoshi
- Past members: Shunji Iwai
- Website: lilychouchou.jp

Lily Chou-Chou (リリイ シュシュ, Rirī Shushu) is a Japanese band that debuted in 2000. Initially a fictional band that produced music for the 2001 Shunji Iwai film All About Lily Chou-Chou, the group later reformed in 2010 for the 10th anniversary of the film. Lily Chou-Chou is not a real person, but a fictional character.

== History ==
Lily Chou-Chou as a character was initially created by Shunji Iwai in 2000, as a part of an online novel that was posted on a BBS. The music was produced as a collaboration between Iwai, Salyu, a musician who had not debuted yet, and Takeshi Kobayashi, a music producer who had previously worked with Iwai on the soundtrack to his 1996 film Swallowtail Butterfly. Iwai supplied the lyrics of two songs to the project, "Arabesque" and "Tobenai Tsubasa."

In April 2000, Lily Chou-Chou music began to be released, with the single "Glide" and later "Kyōmei (Kūkyo na Ishi)" in June. Three Iwai-directed music videos were produced for the project, "Glide," "Kyōmei (Kūkyo na Ishi)" and "Tobenai Tsubasa." Salyu performed "Kyōmei (Kūkyo na Ishi)" on music shows Hey! Hey! Hey! Music Champ and Music Station in June 2000. The group released their album, Kokyū, in October 2001, a week and a half after the release of the film in Japan.

After the release of the film, the group ceased to release music. In 2003, the Lily Chou-Chou song "Kaifuku Suru Kizu" was featured in the Quentin Tarantino film Kill Bill Vol. 1. Salyu debuted as a musician in 2004 with the single "Valon," a collaboration with hip-hop musician Ilmari. She began working with Kobayashi as her producer since her debut, and continues to work with him. Some of Salyu's most notable songs have been composed by him, such as "Atarashii Yes," "Corteo (Gyōretsu)," "Platform," "To U" and "Valon." Salyu included the Lily Chou-Chou songs "Hōwa" and "Glide" on her 2008 greatest hits album Merkmal. On her 2009 tour for Merkmal, she performed "Erotic," "Glide," "Hikōsen," "Kaifuku Suru Kizu," "Sight" and "Tobenai Tsubasa."

For the film's 10th anniversary in 2010, the band reformed as a three-member band featuring guitarist Yukio Nagoshi, however without the direct involvement of Iwai. The group released a digital single, "Ether," on December 8, 2010. The music video for the song was exclusively debuted at MTV Japan on December 1. The group performed live at the Nakano Sun Plaza Hall on December 15, 2010.

== Fictional backstory ==
Lily Chou-Chou is portrayed as the stage name of a solo musician, Keiko Suzuki (鈴木圭子, Suzuki Keiko). She was born on December 8, 1980, at 10:50pm, a fact that fans in the film link to the same time of the murder of Beatles' member John Lennon. She has an official website, Lilyholic, which features as a back-story to the film, including news articles and a discography. The BBS on this website is a crucial feature to the plot of the film. Lily Chou-Chou is portrayed as being extremely successful, with her CDs lining prominent displays in music stores such as Tsutaya.

Lily Chou-Chou was originally the vocalist of the band Philia (フィリア, Firia), that formed and broke up two years after their debut in 1995. This band centered on Katsuro Kayama (加山葛比路, Kayama Katsuro), who wrote the music for the band. Kayama later lead the major-label band Yellow Fellows (イエロウフェロウズ, Ierō Ferōzu). Lily Chou-Chou wrote the lyrics for the band's songs, though some fans believe they were ghostwritten. The band is described as having number one releases on music charts. The group debuted with the single "Addiction" (アディクション, Adikushon) on February 21, 1995, which reached number one on the singles charts. The film mentioned the band having an album named Manic & Depressive (マニック&デプレッシヴ, Manikku ando Depuresshivu), and songs "Abnormality" and "Manic & Depressive." Many of her fans do not like to link Lily Chou-Chou's solo music with Kayama. In the film, when a fan suggested Kayama took part in creating Lily Chou-Chou's solo music, a couple of fans became heated and fought him.

Her fanbase is described as being composed of younger people. These fans are described as fanatic, with some of Lily Chou-Chou's detractors likening her to a cult leader. One of her fans even committed suicide in protest of the content of her second album, Kokyū.

Lily Chou-Chou's music is said to have ether, a term used both by Lily Chou-Chou and her fans. She describes ether as the fabric of the universe, and assigns colours to different types of ether (the emotion despair is close to "red" ether, while hope is close to "blue" ether). Lily Chou-Chou also describes the moods of her albums in terms of these colours.

On Lily Chou-Chou's official site are two news articles from a fictional newspaper, Teito Shinbun (帝都新聞; "Imperial Capital Paper"), describing an incident after a Lily Chou-Chou concert, in which a 15-year-old, Shūsuke Hoshino, is apparently crushed to death by fans wanting to see Lily Chou-Chou. Later news puts doubt to this, as a stab wound piercing his heart was discovered during the autopsy. These news reports are direct references to events in the film.

== Actual discography ==
=== Album ===
Year	Album Information	Oricon albums chart	Reported sales
2001	Kokyū: Released: October 17, 2001; Label: Toshiba EMI (TOCT-24690); Formats: CD, digital download	60	3,700

=== Singles ===
Year	Title	Notes	Oricon singles charts	Oricon sales total	Album
2000	"Glide" (グライド, Guraido)	Released through Sony	—	—	Kokyū
2000	"Kyōmei (Kūkyo na Ishi)" (共鳴(空虚な石); "Resonance (Empty Stone)")	Released through Sony	97	4,500	Kokyū
2010	"Ether" (エーテル, Ēteru)	Digital single	—	—	TBA

== Fictional discography ==
=== Albums ===
Year	Album Information	Track listing
1999	Erotic (エロティック, Erotikku): Released: July 21, 1999; Label: Mash Music Entertainment; "Kyōmei", "Erotic" actual songs	Track listing: 1. "Kyōmei" (共鳴; "Sympathy"); 2. "Kodoku no Shunkan" (孤独の瞬間; "Moment of Loneliness"); 3. "Video Tape" (ビデオテープ, Bideo Tēpu); 4. "Keshō o Shinai Seikatsu" (化粧をしない生活; "Life Without Make-up"); 5. "Ie" (家; "House"); 6. "Erotic" (エロティック, Erotikku); 7. "Yakusoku no Hi" (約束の日; "Promise Day"); 8. "Yubisaki" (指先; "Fingertip"); 9. "Kanashii Hitomi" (悲しい瞳; "Sad Eyes"); 10. "Chinmoku no Ki" (沈黙の木; "Tree of Silence")
2000	Kokyū (呼吸; "Breath"): Released: July 21, 2000; Label: Mash Music Entertainment; Fictional album differs to actual album released with same title; "Arabesque", "Glide", "Hikōsen", "Kaifuku Suru Kizu" and "Tobenai Tsubasa" actual songs	Track listing: 1. "Arabesque" (アラベスク, Arabesuku); 2. "Glide" (グライド, Guraido); 3. "Tomodachi" (友達; "Friend"); 4. "Doyōbi no Yūbin" (土曜日の郵便; "Saturday Mail"); 5. "Tobenai Tsubasa" (飛べない翼; "Flightless Wings"); 6. "Sweater" (セーター, Sētā); 7. "Hikōsen" (飛行船; "Blimp"); 8. "Hana no Hitomi" (花の瞳; "Flower Eyes"); 9. "Kugatsu no Ame no Shinzō" (九月の雨の心臓; "Heart of the September Rain"); 10. "Kaifuku Suru Kizu" (回復する傷; "Healing Wounds")

=== Extended play ===
Year	Album Information	Track listing
1998	Jewel (ジュエル, Jueru): Released: July 21, 1998; Label: Mash Music Entertainment; "Ai no Jikken" an actual song	Track listing: 1. "Mizuumi" (みずうみ; "Lake"); 2. "Mittsu no Tobira" (三つの扉; "Three Doors"); 3. "Odoru Sakana" (踊る魚; "Dancing Fish"); 4. "Ai no Jikken" (愛の実験; "Love Experiment"); 5. "Inu no Me" (犬の眼; "The Eyes of a Dog"); 6. "Orgel" (オルゴオル, Orugōru; "Music Box")

=== Singles ===
Year	Title	Details	Album
1998	"Chinmoku no Ki" (沈黙の木; "Tree of Silence")	B-side "Kyōmei (Kūkyo na Ishi)" an actual song	Erotic
1999	"Kaifuku Suru Kizu" (回復する傷; "Healing Wounds")	Song and B-side "Arabesque" actual songs	Kokyū
2000	"Glide"	Non-fictional CD released on the same day	Kokyū
