= All About Lily Chou-Chou =

2001 Japanese film by Shunji Iwai

- DVD cover
- Directed by: Shunji Iwai
- Written by: Shunji Iwai
- Produced by: Koko Maeda
- Starring: Hayato Ichihara; Shugo Oshinari; Ayumi Ito; Yū Aoi; Izumi Inamori
- Cinematography: Noboru Shinoda
- Edited by: Shunji Iwai
- Music by: Takeshi Kobayashi
- Distributed by: Rockwell Eyes
- Release dates: September 7, 2001 (Toronto Film Festival); October 6, 2001 (Japan)
- Running time: 146 minutes
- Country: Japan
- Language: Japanese
- Budget: $1.2 million
- Box office: $25.2 million

All About Lily Chou-Chou (Japanese: リリイ・シュシュのすべて, Hepburn: Rirī Shushu no Subete) is a 2001 Japanese experimental psychological drama film, written, directed, and edited by Shunji Iwai. The narrative follows several 14-year-old Japanese students living in Ashikaga, Tochigi, examining how enigmatic solo musician Lily Chou-Chou influences their lives.

The film is noted for an unconventional visual style which includes many jump cuts and shots with disjunctive contents, as well as for an elliptical narrative. These features, which have led the film to be described as restless or "explosive", are viewed by critics as efforts to artistically evoke the emotional lives of disaffected Japanese youth.

Critics mostly expressed positive views on All About Lily Chou-Chou. While some found the story's ambiguity frustrating, the film's lyricism, visuals, and soundtrack drew praise. The film has gained a cult following both domestically and internationally in the years after its release.

== Plot ==
All About Lily Chou-Chou follows the lives of two boys, Yūichi Hasumi and Shūsuke Hoshino, from the start of junior high school into their second year. The film follows a nonlinear narrative structure, beginning midway through the story just after the second term of junior high school begins, then flashing back to the first term, then summer vacation, and then returning to the present as it covers the rest of the second term.

Fourteen-year-old Yuichi Hasumi runs a fansite and message board dedicated to Lily Chou-Chou, his favorite singer. Posting under the alias "Philia," he befriends other users, including a pervasive one named "Blue Cat." A shy and socially outcast teenager, Yuichi is viciously bullied by his older classmate Shusuke Hoshino along with members of his gang, who beat Yuichi and force him to masturbate in front of them.

The film flashes back to the previous year, where Shusuke is introduced as the academically gifted class president who meets Yuichi at the school's kendo club. The pair become close friends, and Shusuke invites Yuichi to stay over at his house, introducing him to Lily Chou-Chou's music. Yuichi is moved by her music, joining her cult following. Back at school, he develops a crush on his classmate, Yōko Kuno.

On summer vacation, Shusuke, Yuichi, and their friends decide to take a trip to Okinawa. Once there, Shusuke has a traumatic near-death experience from almost drowning, and his personality changes from good-natured to dangerous and manipulative. Returning to school in September, he takes his place as a class bully and shows his newfound power by ruining the lives of his classmates. An alternative voice, that of the character Sumika Kanzaki, attributes Shusuke's personality change to the collapse of his family's business and his parents' divorce.

Yuichi finds himself sucked into his now-tormentor's gang. He is ridiculed and coerced into doing Shusuke's dirty work and finds solace only in the ethereal music of Lily Chou-Chou and chatting with his online friends on his fan website. Things become far worse for everyone when Yuichi is assigned to supervise Shiori Tsuda, whom Shusuke has blackmailed into enjo kōsai.

Yōko is raped by Shusuke's lackeys after unwittingly offending the school's girl gang. She cuts off her hair to avoid the same fate as Shiori. A guilt-ridden Yuichi lends Shiori his copy of Lily Chou-Chou's album; she later dies by suicide. Yuichi, grieving over Shiori's death, is talked out of suicide by Blue Cat in a series of online messages.

Yuichi heads to Tokyo to see a Lily Chou-Chou concert, where he and "Blue Cat" have also arranged to meet in person. Yuichi runs into Shusuke, who coercively throws away Yuichi's ticket, and realizes that Shusuke was Blue Cat. Yuichi watches the concert outside on a screen, encountering Shusuke again once the concert ends. When Shusuke turns to leave, Yuichi creates a commotion in the crowd, then stabs Shusuke to death amid the chaos.

At home, Yuichi begins his life again, reconciling with his schoolteacher and dyeing his hair. He shares a moment with Yōko as she plays piano. The movie's final scene shows Yuichi, Shusuke, and Shiori standing alone in a field, listening to the music of Lily Chou-Chou.

== Cast ==
- Hayato Ichihara as Yūichi Hasumi (蓮見雄一 Hasumi Yūichi), Shusuke's former friend who becomes a reluctant member of his gang. He admins an online Lily Chou-Chou BBS under the alias Philia (フィリア Firia) and is a great fan of the singer.
- Shugo Oshinari as Shūsuke Hoshino (星野修介 Hoshino Shūsuke), the best student in school who, after a trip to Okinawa, becomes a bully. Posts under the alias Blue Cat (青猫 Ao Neko).
- Ayumi Ito as Yōko Kuno (久野陽子 Kuno Yōko), a classmate of Yūichi's. A brilliant pianist, she is the envy of a clique of powerful girls, and therefore is also bullied. Ayumi Ito, despite having no previous training in piano, spent weeks practising so that she could act all of her scenes without a double. She became so obsessed with Debussy's "Arabesque No. 1" that she made it her cell phone ringtone.
- Yū Aoi as Shiori Tsuda (津田詩織 Tsuda Shiori), a classmate of Yūichi who gets blackmailed into enjo kōsai by Shusuke.
- Yuki Ito as Kamino, one of the boys at the train station
- Izumi Inamori as Izumi Hoshino (星野いずみ Hoshino Izumi), Shusuke's mother
- Salyu as Lily Chou-Chou, the enigmatic and ethereal singer that Yūichi, Tsuda and others in the film are fans of. She is hardly seen in the film, except on a video screen near the story's end, but her music is heard throughout the movie. The idea of Lily Chou-Chou the rock star was inspired by Faye Wong.
- Takao Osawa as Takao Tabito
- Miwako Ichikawa as Shimabukuro, one of the women they meet in Okinawa.
- Tetsu Sawaki as Retsuya Inubushi, the former school bully that Shusuke replaces

== Production ==
On April 1, 2000, Shunji Iwai went live with his internet novel, in the form of a website called Lilyholic, where he posted messages as several characters on the Bulletin Board System (BBS). Readers of the novel were free to post alongside Iwai's characters and interact with each other, indeed this BBS is where some of the content from the movie comes from. After the main incident in the novel took place, the posting was closed and the second phase of the novel started, about the lives of 14-year-olds. The novel is available on CD-ROM, but only in Japanese.

Production on the film began in Ashikaga, Tochigi Prefecture on August 13, 2000, and ended on November 28, 2000.

Extras at the concert scene were each given an index card with detailed information about their characters and even lines. There were nearly one thousand extras, some of whom were fans of the internet novel and had BBS meet-ups during the day.

Iwai was the first Japanese director to use the, at the time, completely new digital video camera, the Sony HDW-F900 to shoot the film. It is thought that Iwai was inspired to shoot digitally by his friend, the anime and live-action film director Hideaki Anno, who shot his digital film entitled Love & Pop, in 1998.

The movie's original runtime was 157 minutes, but the original 157-minute print no longer exists because it had been burned. The extra 11 minutes consisted of an extended rape scene, a scene of Yūichi on the beach similar to Hoshino's drowning scene, and an extended funeral sequence following the death of Shiori Tsuda.

A documentary about the film was made, which records behind-the-scenes footage and shows the crew discussing the film.

== Music ==
The soundtrack of Lily Chou-Chou was written and arranged by Takeshi Kobayashi, with vocals by the singer Salyu. It features many songs which are sung by the fictional rock star Lily Chou-Chou in the film. The soundtrack also heavily uses the classical music of Claude Debussy.

== Style ==
Comparing it to The 400 Blows (1959), Andrew O'Hehir dubbed All About Lily Chou-Chou "sprawling and adventurous [...] [Iwai's] movie has a youthful restlessness, an almost compulsive daring". According to Entertainment Weekly's Lisa Schwarzbaum, Iwai "creates Yuichi’s world as much through disembodied moments of sight and sound as through action". According to Kevin Thomas in Los Angeles Times, the film contains "sweeping juxtapositions of the beautiful and the terrible in both the aural and the visual". After the trip to Okinawa, Shinoda switches to a "restless, jabbing, hand-held camera style [...] for a deliberately unsettling effect."

According to Scott Tobias of The A.V. Club, Iwai aimed to capture the feeling of being a teenager; the writer claimed that it "mimics the aimless, unformed rhythms of adolescent life" by "[d]rifting through time and space without firmly situating the viewer". Michael Atkinson of The Village Voice noted, "Flashbacks are scant signified, and jump cuts leave out massive amounts of motivating incident [...] Iwai prefers to observe from a distance, and he has a taste for disjunctive visuals".

== Interpretation ==
O'Hehir placed the film within the "cinema of globalization" and said that Iwai makes "the oldest possible complaint about modern culture: that as it purports to bring people together it actually keeps them separate". Lily herself never appears in the film, and O'Hehir interpreted her as a symbol of tranquility that has disappeared from the rapidly changing Japan of the film's universe. While Thomas agreed that the film supports the idea that traditional social structures prevent the rise of disaffected youth, he also wrote that the teens' brutality and allegiance to a sadistic leader strongly resembled the militarism of Japan during World War II.

Atkinson argues that All About Lily Chou-Chou "[mourns] the despoiling tragedies of pre-adulthood and the infuriating inadequacy of nostalgia." Tobias said the film ultimately laments how all the teens are bottling up anger.

== Release ==
The film premiered at the Toronto International Film Festival on September 7, 2001, and opened in Japan on October 6, 2001.

- Budget: ¥150,000,000 (US$1,249,656)

Domestic:

- Japan: ¥3,026,188,000 (US$25,211,298)
- Opening week gross: ¥514,775,000 (US$4,288,612)
- In release: 15.7 weeks

International:

- US: US$26,485 (¥3,179,328)

Rentals:

- Japan: ¥810,340,000 (US$6,750,436)

== Critical reception ==
The film has a 69% approval rating on Rotten Tomatoes (based on 39 reviews), and a 73/100 average on Metacritic (based on 18 reviews). Atkinson referred to All About Lily Chou-Chou as "possibly the loveliest film ever shot on high-def video." He argued that the work overly lacks narrative cues, but still wrote that "Iwai fashions pensive cyber-lyricism out of a new generation’s instruments of introversion". O'Hehir praised "its wealth of ideas, its willingness to go anywhere and do anything [...] [Iwai's] lustrous images and the complexity of his portrayal of middle-class Japan in decline". He described it as a "puzzling, intermittently brilliant film". In Quentin Tarantino's "off-the-top-of-the-head best-of-list", All About Lily Chou-Chou is included in fifth place. The director expresses particular admiration for the film score: "The Lily Chou-Chou soundtrack is really cool to make out to".

In The A.V. Club, Scott Tobias wrote, "Iwai's arty self-consciousness takes some getting used to, but as the film slides inexorably toward a devastating third act, it seems to tighten its grasp on the sad, painful remove that governs its young characters' lives." Kevin Thomas wrote a moderately positive review in Los Angeles Times, calling the work "maddeningly hard to follow" but also "profoundly disturbing [...] Iwai’s depiction of what life can be like for far too many teens comes across loud and clear."

Roger Ebert gave the film two stars, dismissing the visual style as "tiresome and pretentious". In the narrative he wrote, "The elements are in place for a powerful story of alienated Japanese teenagers, but [Iwai] cannot bring himself to make the story accessible to ordinary audiences. [...] Some sequences are so incomprehensible they play as complete abstractions." Regarding the comparisons to The 400 Blows, Ebert argued, "Truffaut broke with traditional styles to communicate better, not to avoid communicating at all." In 2020, James Marsh of South China Morning Post listed the film as one of the 25 best Japanese films since 2000.

== Awards and nominations ==
- 2002 52nd Berlin International Film Festival – Panorama (Shunji Iwai)
- 2002 6th Shanghai International Film Festival – Best Music (Takeshi Kobayashi) and Special Jury Award (Shunji Iwai)
