= Bank Band =

Japanese band

Bank Band (バンク バンド) is a Japanese band formed by Kazutoshi Sakurai and Takeshi Kobayashi.

== Members ==
- Kazutoshi Sakurai (樱井和寿) – vocal, guitar
- Takeshi Kobayashi (小林武史) – keyboards
- Hideo Yamaki (山木秀夫) – drums
- Kawamura Noriyasu (河村智康) – drums
- Mikuzuki Chiharu (美久月千晴) – bass
- Seiji Kameda (亀田诚治) – bass
- TOKIE – bass
- Furukawa Masayoshi (古川昌义) – guitar
- Hirokazu Ogura (小仓博和) – guitar
- Hiroshi Takano (高野寛) – guitar
- Takuo Yamamoto (山本拓夫) – saxophone, flute
- Nishimura Koji (西村浩二) – trumpet
- Fujii Tamao (藤井珠绪) – percussion
- Udai Shika (四家卯大) – cello
- Oki Shoko (冲祥子) – violin
- Kikuchi Mikiyo (菊地干代) – violin
- Tajima Akiko (田岛朗子) – violin
- Ise Mikiko (伊势三木子) – violin
- Nishimori Noriko (西森记子) – violin
- Momoko Ishii (イシイモモコ) – refrain
- Tosaka Ryota (登坂亮太) – refrain

== Discography ==
=== Albums ===
- Soushi Souai (沿志奏逢) (2004)
- Soushi Souai 2 (沿志奏逢 2) (2008)
- Soushi Souai 3 (沿志奏逢 3) (2010)
- Soushi Souai 4 (沿志奏逢 4) (2021)

=== Singles ===
- "Umare Kuru Kodomotachi no Tame ni" ("生まれくる子供たちのために") (2005)
- "To U" (2006)
- "Harumatsu Ibuki (はるまついぶき)" (2007) (digital)
- "Souai Band Bank Theme" ("奏逢~ Bank Bandのテーマ~") (2009)

=== Video ===
- BGM Vol.2 ~Enshi Souai (2004)
- ap bank fes '05 (2005)
- ap bank fes '06 (2006)
- ap bank fes '07 (2008)
- ap bank fes '08 (2009)
- ap bank fes '09 (2010)
- ap bank fes '10 (2011)
- ap bank fes '11 (2012)
- ap bank fes '12 (2013)
