= Shunji Iwai =

Japanese film director, video artist, writer and documentary maker

- 岩井 俊二
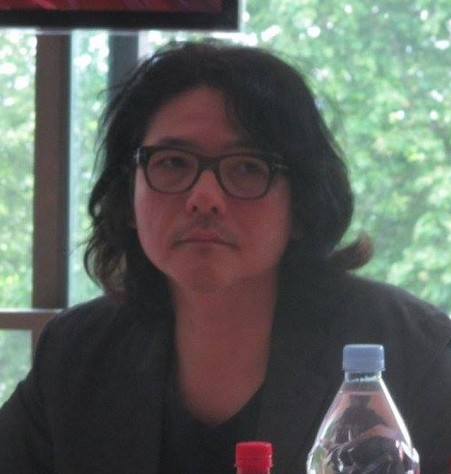
- Iwai at the 2015 Annecy International Animated Film Festival
- Born: 24 January 1963 (age 63); Sendai, Miyagi, Japan
- Occupations: Director, video artist, screenwriter, editor, composer, producer

Shunji Iwai (Japanese: 岩井 俊二, Hepburn: Iwai Shunji; born 24 January 1963) is a Japanese filmmaker, writer, and musician.

He is best known for his films All About Lily Chou-Chou (2001) and Love Letter (1995).

== Life and career ==
=== Early career ===
Iwai was born in Sendai, Miyagi, Japan. He attended Yokohama National University, graduating in 1987.

He started out in the Japanese entertainment industry by directing TV dramas and music videos. In 1993, his television drama, Fireworks, brought him critical praise and the Directors Guild of Japan New Directors Award for his portrayal of a group of children in the town of Iioka. The film would later receive an anime adaptation in 2017.

=== 1994-1996: Love Letter, Picnic and Swallowtail Butterfly ===
In 1995, he released his first feature film, the internationally successful Love Letter (released in the United States as When I Close My Eyes). It starred Miho Nakayama in a dual role. At the time, it was the highest grossing non-animated Japanese film in South Korea and helped

In 1996, he released two films, Picnic and Swallowtail Butterfly. Picnic was originally filmed in 1994 and stars J-pop star Chara,

The fictional band from Swallowtail Butterfly, 'YEN TOWN BAND', was a collaboration with Takeshi Kobayashi and Chara. It was a commercial hit in Japan and included the song Swallowtail Butterfly (Ai no Uta), a sleeper hit that eventually reached which reached #1 on Oricon's weekly singles charts.

=== 1997-2001: April Story and All About Lily Chou-Chou ===
In 1998, he released the film April Story, starring Takako Matsu about a girl who leaves the island of Hokkaido to attend university in Tokyo.

Iwai starred in Hideaki Anno's 2000 film Shiki-Jitsu, alongside Ayako Fujitani. He plays a director who tries using his camera to communicate with a young woman who has a daily ritual of repeating “tomorrow is my birthday”. To date, this is his only lead acting role.

In 2001, he released his biggest film All About Lily Chou-Chou. Kobayashi would once again create the music for the titular pop star, Lily Chou-Chou (voiced by Japanese singer Salyu), that is spread through the film, and later be released as an album entitled Kokyu (Breathe). Kobayashi also composed much of the soundtrack, incorporating the music of Claude Debussy, in particular Clair de lune.

=== 2002-2004: Hana & Alice ===
In 2002, he released a short film, ARITA, which featured his first time composing a film score.

In 2003, Iwai made a series of three comedy short films entitled Hana & Alice which was commissioned by Nestlé's 'breaktown.com' website. These later served as the basis for his 2004 feature film of the same name, of which he once again composed the film score.

=== 2006-2011: Production work and english crossover ===
Iwai spent time in 2006 documenting and interviewing the filmmaker Kon Ichikawa for a documentary, The Inugamis (Inugamike no ichizoku), which covered the director's life. He also produced and wrote the film Rainbow Song, but was credited by a pen name, 'Aminosan', for his writing work.

In 2008, Iwai contributed to the American anthology film New York, I Love You. He directed segment 3, which starred Orlando Bloom and Christina Ricci. This marked his first work in the English language.

In 2009 he produced two Japanese films, Halfway and Baton, the later of which he also wrote.

A film he wrote and produced, Bandage, was released on January 16, 2010.

In 2011, he released his first, and currently only, feature film in entirely English, the horror film Vampire. The film premiered at the Sundance Film Festival and received mixed reviews.

=== 2012 - present ===
In 2012, he worked on the film I Have to Buy New Shoes as a producer, editor, director of photography and executive producer. In 2013 he composed the score for the film Far Away, So Close.

An animated prequel to Hana and Alice was released in 2015, titled The Case of Hana & Alice, where Iwai reprised his role.

He adapted his novel A Bride for Rip van Winkle to film in 2016. The film got re edited as a 4 hour long mini series in 2017, A Bride for Rip Van Winkle: The Serial Edition.

In 2017, he directed a mini series Chang-ok's Letter for Nescafé.

He released two adaptations of his novel Last Letter, a chinese one in 2018 and a japanese one in 2020. Also in 2020, he released a web series, turned film titled The 12 Day Tale of the Monster that Died in 8 which was recorded during the lockdowns imposed by the COVID-19 pandemic.

His film Kyrie was released in 2023 and received the mini-series treatment in 2024 under the name Luca on the Road.

== List of works ==
This list of works includes his work in film, TV & literature.

== Awards ==
Unknown Child

- 1991 - Galaxy Award, Dranma dos Award.

Fireworks

- 1993 - Directors Guild of Japan New Directors Award

Undo

- 1995 - Berlin International Film Festival, Forum of new cinema, Netpac Award.

Picnic

- 1996 - Berlin International Film Festival, Forum of new cinema Prize of the Readers of the Berliner Zeitung.

Love Letter

- Montreal World Film Festival Audience Award.
- 20th Houchi Cinema Award: Best Director.
- 8th Nikkan Sports Movie Award: Best Newcomer.
- 69th Kinema Junpo Best 10: Reader's poll for Directors.
- 50th Mainichi Movie Competition: Best Japanese Movie.
- 17th Yokohama Film Festival: Production Award, Director Award.
- 21st Osaka Film Festival: Production Award, Best New Director.
- 19th Academy Award in Japan: Best Production.
- 6th ACA Film Award: Best Film Production.
- 46th Arts Recommendations: Newcomer Award from the Ministry of Culture.
- 10th Takasaki Film Festival: Grand Prix of young directors.

Swallowtail Butterfly

- 1998 - Fant-Asia Film Festival, Best Asian Film.

April Story

- 1998 - Pusan International Film Festival, Audience Award.

All About Lily Chou-Chou

- 2002 - Berlin International Film Festival: The C.I.C.A.E. Panorama Prize.
- 2002 - 6th Shanghai International Film Festival: Special Jury Award / Best Music.

Hana & Alice

- Best Actress: Yū Aoi, 2005– Japanese Professional Movie Award

== See also ==
- Cinema of Japan
