= Kenichi Tahara =

Japanese musician (born 1969)

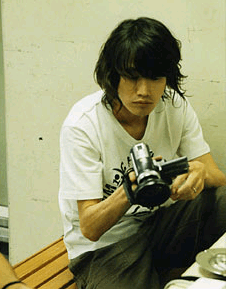
- Kenichi Tahara in June 2004

Background information
- Also known as: Tahara-san, Kōtei
- Born: 田原 健一; September 24, 1969 (age 57); Fukuoka, Japan
- Genres: Rock, pop
- Occupation: Musician
- Years active: 1987–present
- Label: Toy's Factory
- Member of: Mr. Children

Kenichi Tahara (田原 健一, Tahara Ken'ichi) is a Japanese musician. He plays lead guitar in the band Mr. Children.

== Early life ==
He was born in Fukuoka, and moved to Nakano, Tokyo. He attended Komae Daini Junior High School in the city of Komae, Tokyo, where he met the other future band members Keisuke Nakagawa and Hideya Suzuki.

== Guitars used ==
- Gibson Les Paul Standard
- Seymour Duncan DS-185
- Guitars R US Telecaster Thinline
