= Keisuke Nakagawa =

Japanese musician

- Born: 中川 敬輔
- Genres: Rock, pop
- Occupation: Musician
- Years active: 1987–present
- Label: Toy's Factory

Keisuke Nakagawa (中川 敬輔, Nakagawa Keisuke) is a Japanese musician. He plays bass guitar in the band Mr. Children.

== Early life ==
He attended Komae Daini Junior High School in the city of Komae, Tokyo, where he met the other future band members Kenichi Tahara and Hideya Suzuki.
