= Hideya Suzuki (musician) =

- Born: 鈴木 英哉; November 14, 1969 (age 56); Suginami, Japan
- Genres: Rock, pop
- Occupation: Musician
- Years active: 1987–present
- Label: Toy's Factory

Hideya Suzuki (鈴木 英哉, Suzuki Hideya) is a Japanese musician. He plays drums in the band Mr. Children.

== Early life ==
He was born in the ward of Suginami in Tokyo. A fan of Yui Asaka, he auditioned to be her exclusive drummer before joining a Japanese group called THE WALLS that would be renamed Mr. Children in 1989, but he failed at the document screening stage. Suzuki himself thinks he was dropped due to his looks.

== Career in Mr. Children ==
He composed the song "Asia" on the album Atomic Heart released in 1994 and "#2601" on the album Discovery released in 1998 (co-written with Sakurai). He has also done vocals for the band and so in his early work, he is credited as "Drums & Vocal".

The song "Ame nochi hare" on the album Atomic Heart was written by imagining that "Suzuki was an office worker", and Suzuki was originally scheduled to be in charge of vocals on that track. However, Sakurai performed the vocals during production. Suzuki no longer performed vocals after this track, and is credited as "Drums" on works thereafter.

== Influences and musical style ==
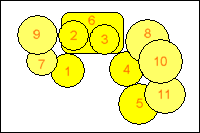
Arrangement of Suzuki's drums in the band's live concerts.

Suzuki's work is closely related to blues and jazz, due to the influence of his parents. After graduating, he began to play classic rock songs alternating with some acid rock and punk influences of the time (such as JUN SKY WALKER(S)).

Arrangement of his drums (see image on right):

1. Snare drum
2. High tom
3. Low tom
4. and 5. Floor toms
6. Bass drum
7. Hi-hat
8. Ride cymbals
9., 10., and 11. Crash cymbals
