= Takeshi Kobayashi =

- Born: June 7, 1959 (age 65)
- Origin: Shinjō, Yamagata, Japan
- Genres: Pop; rock; soft rock; film score
- Occupations: Composer; lyricist; music producer; arranger
- Instruments: Keyboards; synthesizer; piano; bass
- Years active: 1977–present

Takeshi Kobayashi (小林 武史, Kobayashi Takeshi, born June 7, 1959), is a Japanese keyboardist, lyricist, composer, arranger, and record producer.

== History ==
Kobayashi started his professional career in the late 1970s. After working in the backing bands for singers such as Yosui Inoue, Misato Watanabe, and Anri, he came into prominence as a musical collaborator for the Southern All Stars frontman Keisuke Kuwata's eponymous 1988 solo album.

Although his own leader albums failed to receive public attention, Kobayashi garnered commercial success in collaboration as producer or songwriter with other artists. As an arranger of his own composition "Anata ni Aete Yokatta" co-written and performed by Kyōko Koizumi in 1991, Kobayashi won the 33rd Japan Record Awards for Best Arrangement category. In 1992, he undertook the production work with the Japanese pop-rock band Mr. Children on their debut album entitled Everything. The producer and the band have gone on to record together to date, achieving mainstream success with cumulative sales of over 58 million copies albums and singles as of March 2013. In 1995, Kobayashi formed another multi-million selling pop group My Little Lover fronted by his then-girlfriend and first spouse Akko, and remained as a full-time member of the band until the couple's marriage broke up in the mid 2000s.

Kobayashi has written several film scores, including Swallowtail (1996) and All About Lily Chou-Chou (2001). Not only composing music, he also directed the film Bandage (2010).

In addition to his career as a musician, Kobayashi has also worked as a social activist and a philanthropist. Along with Grammy-winning producer Ryuichi Sakamoto and Mr.Children's chief singer-songwriter Kazutoshi Sakurai, he established a non-profit organization called AP Bank in 2003. Kobayashi and Sakurai have formed the charity supergroup Bank Band since 2004, and have released three albums and two singles to date.

== Discography ==
=== Solo albums ===
- Duality (1988)
- Testa Rossa (1989)
- Works I (2008)

=== Collaborations ===
- Boku no machi ni asobi ni kite yo (digital single) (October 16, 2019) (Shikao Suga's single, song co-writer)

== Scores ==
=== Film ===
- Inamura Jane (1990)
- Swallowtail (1996)
- All About Lily Chou-Chou (2001)
- Shinkokyu no Hitsuyo (2004)
- Metro ni Notte (2006)
- Kofuku na Shokutaku (2006)
- Midnight Eagle (2007)
- Halfway (2009)
- Bandage (2010)
- For Love's Sake (2012)
- If Cats Disappeared From the World (2016)
- Last Letter (2020)
- Kyrie (2023)
- April Come She Will (2024)

=== Television ===
- Zutto Anata ga Suki datta (1992)
- Double Kitchens (1993)
- Dare ni mo Ienai' (1993)
- Owaranai Natsu (1995)
- Amon: The Darkside of The Devilman (2000)

== Filmography ==
Fiims

- es: Mr. Children in Film (director, producer) (1995)
- Halfway (producer) (2009)
- Bandage (director, producer, editor) (2010)

Televisions

- Neo Colla! Tokyo Kankyo Kaigi (executive producer)(2008 / 2009)

== Bibliography ==
- Kankyo to Yokubo: Tokyo Kankyo Kaigi (2008)

== Awards ==
Year	Ceremony	Award
1990	Japan Record Award	Arranger Award
2006	Japan Record Award	Arranger Award
