= Ai Otsuka discography =

- Studio albums: 8
- Live albums: 11
- Compilation albums: 3
- Singles: 23

The discography of Ai Otsuka, a Japanese singer-songwriter, contains eight studio albums, two compilation albums, eleven live DVD albums, and twenty-two singles.

== Studio albums ==
List of studio albums, with selected chart positions and certifications
| Title | Album details | Peak chart positions | Sales | Certifications |
| Title | Album details | JPN | Sales | Certifications |
|---|---|---|---|---|
| Love Punch | Released: March 31, 2004; Label: Avex Trax; Formats: CD, CD+DVD, digital download, streaming | 3 | 750,000 | 3× Platinum |
| Love Jam | Released: November 17, 2004; Label: Avex Trax; Formats: CD, CD+DVD, digital download, streaming | 1 | 657,000 | 2× Platinum |
| Love Cook | Released: December 14, 2005; Label: Avex Trax; Formats: CD, CD+DVD, CD+photo book, CD+picture book, digital download, streaming | 1 | 835,000 | 3× Platinum |
| Love Piece | Released: September 26, 2007; Label: Avex Trax; Formats: CD, CD+DVD, digital download, streaming | 1 | 500,000 | 2× Platinum |
| Love Letter | Released: December 17, 2008; Label: Avex Trax; Formats: CD, CD+DVD, digital download, streaming | 3 | 180,000 | Gold |
| Love Fantastic | Released: July 16, 2014; Label: Avex Trax; Formats: CD, CD+DVD, CD+BD, digital download, streaming | 22 | 6,000 | |
| Love Tricky | Released: April 22, 2015; Label: Avex Trax; Formats: CD, CD+DVD, digital download, streaming | 24 | 3,800 | |
| Love Honey | Released: April 12, 2017; Label: Avex Trax; Formats: CD, CD+DVD, CD+BD, CD+goods, digital download, streaming | 23 | 2,800 | |
| Love Pop | Released: December 8, 2021; Label: Avex Trax; Formats: CD, CD+2DVD, CD+BD, CD+goods, digital download, streaming | 31 | 2,100 | |

== Mini-albums ==
| Year | Title | Peak Positions | Sales | Certifications (sales thresholds) |
|---|---|---|---|---|
| 2009 | Love.It: Released as LOVE; Released: November 18, 2009 | 82 | 1,334 | |
| 2014 | Aio Punch: Self-cover album; Released: March 26, 2014 | 67 | 1,988 | |
| 2018 | Aio Piano: Live piano and vocals album; Released: February 7, 2018 | 60 | | |
| 2023 | Marble: Collaboration album; Released: September 9, 2023 | 81 | | |
| 2024 | Graine: Instrumental album; Released: July 17, 2024 | | | |

== Compilation albums ==
| Year | Information | Peak Positions | Sales | Certifications (sales thresholds) |
|---|---|---|---|---|
| 2007 | Ai am Best (愛 am Best): Released: March 28, 2007 | 1 | 728,000 | 3× Platinum (JP) |
| 2009 | Love Is Best: Released: November 11, 2009 | 1 | 94,000 | Gold (JP) |
| 2019 | Ai Am Best, Too (愛 am Best, too): Released: January 1, 2019 | 23 | 11,300 | |
| 2020 | Aio Piano Arioso: Released: March 11, 2020 | 40 | 1,002 | |

=== Digital-exclusive compilations ===
List of compilations with notes
| Title | Description | Notes |
|---|---|---|
| 10th Anniversary Commemorative "Aio Punch" Original Ver. Collection +4 (10th Anniversary記念『AIO PUNCH』オリジナルver集+4) | Released: February 26, 2014; Label: Avex Trax | First released exclusively on iTunes a month prior to the release of the Aio Punch mini-album, including the original versions of the songs included there plus 4 bonus tracks to commemorate its release. |
| Ballad Collection | Released: November 12, 2014; Label: Avex Trax | Selection of ballads from Otsuka's repertoire. Initially released only through iTunes, Recochoku, and the mu-mo store. |
| Live Opening Collection | Released: January 6, 2016; Label: Avex Trax | Collection of songs chosen as opening tracks at Otsuka's past live performances. Initially released only through iTunes and the mu-mo store. |
| Ai Am Best + Love Is Best (愛 am BEST＋LOVE is BEST) | Released: February 3, 2016; Label: Avex Trax | Bundle of Otsuka's two greatest hits album in high-resolution audio format. Otsuka herself supervised the remastering of every track using the original masters. |
| Single Collection: Love Is Born ~15th Anniversary 2018~ | Released: August 1, 2018; Label: Avex Trax | Digital release to commemorate Otsuka's 15th anniversary concert Love Is Born: 15th Anniversary 2018. It includes all of Otsuka's singles as of that date, which were also performed live at said concert. |
| Ai Otsuka Karaoke Hits supported by DAM (大塚 愛 カラオケ HITS supported by DAM) | Released: April 1, 2020; Label: Avex Trax | Digital release sponsored by DAM, a Japanese karaoke machine brand by Daiichi Kosho Company. It includes Otsuka's most popular karaoke songs and their respective instrumental versions. |

== Live albums ==
| Year | Information | Peak Positions | Sales | Certifications (sales thresholds) |
|---|---|---|---|---|
| 2014 | LOVE FANTASTIC TOUR 2014: Otsuka Ai wa Maho Tsukai (おぉーつかあいはまほぉーつかぁい): Released: December 17, 2014 | 125 | | |
| 2015 | LOVE TRiCKY LIVE TOUR 2015: Healthy Music de Taijuu Herushii (ヘルシーミュージックで体重減るしー): Digital album; Released: December 16, 2015 | | | |
| 2015 | LOVE IS BORN ~12th Anniversary 2015~: Digital album; Released: December 16, 2015 | | | |
| 2016 | LOVE IS BORN: 13th Anniversary 2016: Released: December 21, 2016 | 121 | | |
| 2017 | LOVE IS BORN: 14th Anniversary 2017: Released: December 20, 2017 | 150 | | |
| 2018 | LOVE HONEY TOUR 2017: Yuuwaku no Kaori ni Yuu Wakuwaku (誘惑の香りにYOUワクワク): Released: September 5, 2018 | 186 | | |
| 2019 | LOVE IS BORN: 15th Anniversary 2018: Digital album; Released: January 1, 2019 | | | |
| 2019 | Ai am BEST, too Tour 2019 ~Yes! Koko ga Iessu!~ @ Zepp DiverCity 2019.05.02: Digital album; Released: September 4, 2019 | | | |
| 2019 | Ai am BEST, too Tour 2019 ~Yes! Koko ga Iessu!~ @ WWW X 2019.05.10: Digital album; Released: September 4, 2019 | | | |
| 2020 | LOVE IS BORN: 17th Anniversary 2019: Released: January 15, 2020 | 115 | | |
| 2021 | LOVE IS BORN: 17th Anniversary 2020: Released: February 3, 2021 | TBA | | |

== Remix albums ==
| Year | Information | Peak Positions | Sales | Certifications (sales thresholds) |
|---|---|---|---|---|
| 2021 | Ai Inutsuka One on One Collaboration: Released: February 3, 2021 | 68 | | |

== Singles ==
| Year | Title | Peak chart positions | | Sales (JPN) | Certifications | Album |
| Year | Title | Oricon Singles Charts | Billboard Japan Hot 100 | Sales (JPN) | Certifications | Album |
|---|---|---|---|---|---|---|
| 2003 | "Momo no Hanabira" | 24 | — | 45,000 | | Love Punch |
| 2003 | "Sakuranbo" | 5 | — | 589,000 | RIAJ (physical): 2× Platinum; RIAJ (digital): 2× Platinum; RIAJ (streaming): Platinum | Love Punch |
| 2004 | "Amaenbo" | 6 | — | 106,000 | RIAJ (physical): Gold; RIAJ (digital): Gold | Love Punch |
| 2004 | "Happy Days" | 3 | — | 163,000 | RIAJ (physical): Gold | Love Jam |
| 2004 | "Kingyo Hanabi" | 3 | — | 148,000 | RIAJ (physical): Gold; RIAJ (digital): Gold | Love Jam |
| 2004 | "Daisuki da Yo" | 3 | — | 157,000 | RIAJ (physical): Gold; RIAJ (ringtone): 3× Platinum; RIAJ (digital): Gold | Love Jam |
| 2005 | "Kuroge Wagyu Joshio Tan Yaki 680 Yen" | 3 | — | 149,000 | RIAJ (physical): Gold; RIAJ (ringtone): 2× Platinum; RIAJ (digital): Gold | Love Jam |
| 2005 | "Smily" | 1 | — | 310,000 | RIAJ (physical): Platinum; RIAJ (ringtone): Million; RIAJ (digital): Gold | Love Cook |
| 2005 | "Biidama" | 1 | — | 310,000 | RIAJ (physical): Platinum | Love Cook |
| 2005 | "Neko ni Fūsen" | 3 | — | 111,000 | RIAJ (physical): Gold | Love Cook |
| 2005 | "Planetarium" | 1 | — | 316,000 | RIAJ (physical): Platinum; RIAJ (ringtone): Million; RIAJ (digital): Million; RIAJ (streaming): Silver | Love Cook |
| 2006 | "Frienger" | 2 | — | 173,000 | RIAJ (physical): Platinum; RIAJ (ringtone): 3× Platinum; RIAJ (digital): Platinum | Love Piece |
| 2006 | "Yumekui" | 5 | — | 147,000 | RIAJ (physical): Gold; RIAJ (ringtone): Million; RIAJ (digital): Gold | Love Piece |
| 2006 | "Ren'ai Shashin" | 2 | — | 148,000 | RIAJ (physical): Gold; RIAJ (ringtone): 3× Platinum; RIAJ (digital): Gold | Love Piece |
| 2007 | "Chu-Lip" | 3 | — | 121,000 | RIAJ (physical): Gold; RIAJ (ringtone): Million; RIAJ (digital): Platinum | Love Piece |
| 2007 | "Peach" | 1 | — | 169,000 | RIAJ (physical): Platinum; RIAJ (ringtone): Million; RIAJ (digital): 3× Platinum | Love Piece |
| 2007 | "Heart" | 1 | — | 169,000 | RIAJ (physical): Platinum | Love Piece |
| 2007 | "Pocket" | 5 | — | 61,000 | RIAJ (physical): Gold; RIAJ (digital): Gold | Love Letter |
| 2008 | "Rocket Sneaker" | 4 | 6 | 44,000 | RIAJ (physical): Gold | Love Letter |
| 2008 | "One Time" | 4 | — | 44,000 | RIAJ (physical): Gold | Love Letter |
| 2008 | "Kurage, Nagareboshi" | 4 | 4 | 48,000 | RIAJ (digital): Gold | Love Letter |
| 2009 | "Bye Bye" | 8 | 24 | 21,000 | RIAJ (digital): Gold | Love Letter |
| 2010 | "Zokkondition" | 6 | 8 | 16,000 | | Love Fantastic |
| 2010 | "Lucky Star" | 6 | 79 | 16,000 | | Love Fantastic |
| 2010 | "Action 10.5" | — | — | — | | Love Fantastic |
| 2010 | "I Love xxx" | 8 | 7 | 14,000 | | Love Fantastic |
| 2013 | "Re:Name" | 8 | 26 | 10,000 | | Love Fantastic |
| 2013 | "Sakuranbo -Cocktail-" | — | — | | | Aio Punch |
| 2014 | "More More" | 34 | 55 | 3,000 | | Love Fantastic |
| 2016 | "Hibi, Ikiteireba" | — | — | | | Love Honey |
| 2017 | "Watashi" | 27 | 54 | 3,500 | | Love Honey |
| 2018 | "Dracaena" | 49 | — | | | Ai Am Best, Too |
| 2018 | "Dear, You" | — | — | | | Ai Am Best, Too |
| 2019 | "Kit Palette" | — | — | | | Non-album single |
| 2019 | "Chime" | 35 | — | 1,900 | | Love Pop |
| 2021 | "Aibiki" | — | — | | | Love Pop |
| 2021 | "Nandakke" | — | — | | | Love Pop |
| 2021 | "Go" | — | — | | | Love Pop |
| 2021 | "Santa ni Kiss wo Shite" | — | — | | | Love Pop |
| 2022 | "Smily 2" | — | — | | | Non-album single |
| 2023 | "Maybe I Love You" | — | — | | | Non-album single |
| 2023 | "Vanity" | — | — | | | Marble |
| 2023 | "Freeky" | — | — | | | Marble |
| 2024 | "Planetarium" (from The First Take) | — | — | | | Non-album single |
| 2024 | "Sakuranbo -Cocktail-" (from The First Take) | — | — | | | Non-album single |
"—" denotes items that did not chart or were released before the creation of the Billboard Japan Hot 100.

== Other appearances ==
List of other appearances, showing other performing artists, year released, and album name
| Title | Year | Other performer(s) | Album |
|---|---|---|---|
| "Cherish" | 2005 | | Love for Nana: Only 1 Tribute |
| "To Me" | 2006 | | Tokyo Friends: The Movie Music Collection |
| "Chotto" (ちょっと) | 2006 | | Tokyo Friends: The Movie Music Collection |
| "Friends -Sabakan ver.-" (フレンズ -サバカンver.-) | 2006 | | Tokyo Friends: The Movie Music Collection |
| "Kimi to Iu Hana" (君という花) | 2006 | | Tokyo Friends: The Movie Music Collection |
| "Hurricane" (ハリケーン) | 2006 | | Tokyo Friends: The Movie Music Collection |
| "Tears -Sabakan ver.-" (tears -サバカンver.-) | 2006 | | Tokyo Friends: The Movie Music Collection |
| "Tokyo Purin ga Jūshūnen" (東京プリンが10周年) | 2007 | Tokyo Purin | The Best of Tokyo Purin Sono 2 |
| "Lover Soul" | 2009 | | Judy and Mary 15th Anniversary Tribute Album |
| "Romance" | 2014 | | Watashi to Dorikamu: Dreams Come True 25th Anniversary Best Covers |
| "Futatabi" | 2023 | Yoshiki Mizuno | Hiroba |
| "Fun" | 2023 | | Kyrie no Uta Original Soundtrack: Ruka |
| "Orange Moon" | 2024 | Yona Yona Weekenders | Non-album single |

== Video albums ==
- Jam Punch Tour 2005: Condor no Pants ga Kuikondoru (コンドルのパンツがくいコンドル) (July 27, 2005)
- Love Cook Tour 2006: Mascara Mainichi Tsuketemasu Kara (マスカラ毎日つけてマスカラ) (July 26, 2006)
- Love is Born: 3rd Anniversary 2006 (January 1, 2007)
- Ai am Best Tour 2007: Best na Comment ni Meccha Ai wo Komento!!! (ベストなコメントにめっちゃ愛を込めんと!!!) (September 26, 2007)
- Love Is Born: 4th Anniversary 2007 (January 1, 2008)
- Love Piece Tour 2008: Megane Kakenakya Yume ga Nee! (メガネかけなきゃユメがねぇ!) (July 30, 2008)
- Love Is Born: 5th Anniversary 2008 (February 25, 2009)
- Love Letter Tour 2009: Channel Keshite Ai-chan Neru! (チャンネル消して愛ちゃん寝る!) (May 6, 2009)
- Love Letter Tour 2009: Light Terashite, Ai to Yume to Kandō to... Warai to! (ライト照らして、愛と夢と感動と...笑いと!) (September 23, 2009)
- Love Is Born: 6th Anniversary 2009 (March 17, 2010)
- Love is Best Tour 2009 Final (June 2, 2010)
- Love Is Born: 7th Anniversary 2010 (March 9, 2011)
- Love Is Born: 10th Anniversary 2013 (March 19, 2014)
- Love Fantastic Tour 2014: Ōtsuka Ai wa Mahōtsukāi (おぉーつかあいはまほぉーつかぁい) (December 17, 2014)
- ai otsuka LIVE BOX 2015: TRiCKY BORNBON (January 20, 2016)
- Love Is Born: 13th Anniversary 2016 (December 21, 2016)
- Love Is Born: 14th Anniversary 2017 (December 20, 2017)
- Love Honey Tour 2017: Yuuwaku no Kaori ni Yuu Wakuwaku (誘惑の香りにYOUワクワク) (September 5, 2018)
- Love Is Born: 16th Anniversary 2019 (January 15, 2020)
- Love Is Born: 17th Anniversary 2020 (February 3, 2021)

== Theme songs and tie-ins ==
- "Momo no Hanabira" – theme song for Suika
- "Sakuranbo" – featured in the game Taiko no Tatsujin Po~taboru by Namco and Drummania V by Konami
- "Pretty Voice" – theme song for Shoubu Shitagi (aka Division 1 Stage 1)
- "Kuroge Wagyuu Joshio Tanyaki 680 Yen" – ending song for Black Jack
- "Friends" – theme song for Tokyo Friends, the drama Otsuka starred in.
- "Planetarium" – image song for Hana yori Dango
- "Yumekui" – theme song for the Tokyo Friends movie
- "Ren'ai Shashin" – theme song for the movie Tada, Kimi o Aishiteru
- "Chu-Lip" – theme song for the drama Kirakira Kenshui
- "Cherish" – theme song for Love for Nana
- "Peach" – ending theme song for Hanazakari no Kimitachi e
- "Peach" – featured in the game Taiko no Tatsujin 2 by Namco and Drummania V by Konami
- "Bye Bye" – song for Asahi Slat 2009 TVCM
- "Lucky Star" – theme Song for Vancouver Olympic winter game 2010 (on TV Fuji)
- "Zokkondition" – song for Asahi Slat 2010 TVCM
- "Chime" – Fruits Basket: 1st Season 2nd Opening Song

== See also ==
- Love (Ai Otsuka)#Discography
