= Ai Am Best, Too =

Greatest hits album by Ai Otsuka
- Released: January 1, 2019
- Genre: J-pop, pop rock, electronic music
- Label: Avex Trax

Ai Otsuka chronology
Love Honey (2017)	Ai Am Best, Too (2019)	Ai Inutsuka One on One Collaboration (2021)

Teaser video
- "I Am Best, Too" on YouTube

Ai Am Best, Too (Japanese: 愛 am BEST, too, Hepburn: Ai Amu Besuto Tsū) is a greatest hits album by Japanese singer-songwriter Ai Otsuka. It was released on January 1, 2019, through Avex Trax.

== Background ==
The sequel of 2007's Ai Am Best, this album was conceived under the concept of "convenience music", reflecting Otsuka's diverse musical range, unconstrained by genre or conventions, "much like the endless choices lining the shelves of a convenience store". Otsuka further explained this by stating, "I would be really happy if people didn't just listen to the songs they feel nostalgic about — like, 'Oh, I remember this one!' — but could enjoy the whole album as a journey, following the flow from start to finish. My music is not exactly what you'd call high-end or luxury brand-style, it is more like something that feels close to you, very accessible, and easy to fit into your daily life. That's the kind of existence I was aiming for when I called it convenience music. It is like a convenience store - always nearby, always stocked with all sorts of things you might need. And with that image in mind, I arranged the tracks so that the first song on Disc 1 starts in the morning, and the final track on Disc 2 circles back to morning again - just like a 24-hour cycle."

The songs to be included on the album were selected by Otsuka herself, and they consist of a total of 31 songs, including most of her singles from "Momo no Hanabira" to "Dracaena", album tracks, and the new song "Dear, You", which was used as theme song of the Japanese theater play Kare Phone (カレフォン), which premiered October 4, 2018. The songs are not listed chronologically, as opposed to the first Ai Am Best album. Explaining why she chose to end the albums with the songs "Dracaena" and then "Re:Name", Otsuka declared: "'Dracaena' represents the end, the closing, the graduation. But I always want to conclude an album with a 'beginning.' That's why I decided to end it with 'Re:Name,' which strongly carries the image of a new day. I wanted to create an album that could stay with someone 24/7, ensuring no one feels alone. As time passes and younger generations emerge, I thought it might be important to knock on their door and introduce myself to those who do not know me yet."

The album was released on three formats: 2CD+DVD, 2CD+Blu-ray disc, and 2CD. The DVD and Blu-ray disc includes footage from Otsuka's concert Love Is Born: 15th Anniversary 2018 held at Hibiya Open-Air Concert Hall on September 9, 2018. Members of Otsuka's Love9Cube fan club could purchase a special edition of the album featuring a third CD with songs selected through fan voting by members on the official fan club app.

The album cover features a logo that resembles both the number “15” for commemorating the 15th anniversary of Otsuka's debut, as well as a heart symbol.

== Critical reception ==
Writing for Rockin'On Japan magazine, music writer Chinami Hachisuka gave a positive review on the album, describing it as a thoughtful and revealing retrospective of Otsuka's multifaceted career, offering a "a well-balanced selection" which spans the full arc of her musical evolution. She highlighted the songs “Sakuranbo” and “Planetarium,” well-known ballads like “Kumuriuta,” playful tracks such as “Shachihata,” as well as relatively recent songs like “Dear, You” and “Dracaena” as examples of such balance. As the songs were selected by Otsuka herself, Hachisuka noted that despite the varied approaches across different eras of her music, Otsuka manages to weave them into a cohesive narrative in this compilation. For Hachisuka, the self-description of "convenience music" put by Otsuka on this album, encapsulates the artist's charm: a gifted songwriter who speaks of her talents with remarkable humility and relatability, noting that she might be one of the only artists who showcase "such extraordinary songwriting talent in such an unpretentious way".

== Track listing ==
All tracks are written by aio.

Ai Am Best, Too - Disc 1
No.	Title	Length
1.	"Watashi" (私)	3:46
2.	"Sakuranbo" (さくらんぼ)	3:57
3.	"Haneari Tamago" (羽ありたまご)	4:57
4.	"Kimi Fechi" (君フェチ)	4:20
5.	"Momo no Hanabira" (桃ノ花ビラ)	4:55
6.	"Rocket Sneaker" (ロケットスニーカー)	4:02
7.	"Frienger" (フレンジャー)	3:46
8.	"Happy Days"	3:44
9.	"Peach"	4:09
10.	"Smily"	3:30
11.	"Tokyo Sanpo" (TOKYO散歩)	4:40
12.	"Kumuri Uta" (クムリウタ)	5:00
13.	"Amaenbo" (甘えんぼ)	4:16
14.	"Neko ni Fūsen" (ネコに風船)	5:12
15.	"Dear, You"	5:26
99.	"Babashi no Theme" (BABASHIのテーマ) (secret track)

Ai Am Best, Too - Disc 2
No.	Title	Length
1.	"Love Fantastic"	4:27
2.	"Kuroge Wagyu Joshio Tanyaki 680-en" (黒毛和牛上塩タン焼680円)	3:53
3.	"Shachihata" (シヤチハタ)	4:02
4.	"Kingyo Hanabi" (金魚花火)	4:34
5.	"Ren'ai Shashin" (恋愛写真)	4:57
6.	"Planetarium" (プラネタリウム)	5:11
7.	"More More" (モアモア)	3:34
8.	"Zokkondition" (ゾッ婚ディション)	4:06
9.	"Parallel World" (パラレルワールド)	4:04
10.	"Chu-Lip"	3:55
11.	"Pon Pon" (ポンポン)	2:21
12.	"Time Machine" (タイムマシーン)	5:12
13.	"Yumekui" (ユメクイ)	5:20
14.	"Hibi, Ikiteireba" (日々、生きていれば)	4:43
15.	"Dracaena" (ドラセナ)	5:42
16.	"Re:Name"	4:54

Ai Am Best, Too - Disc 3 (fan club exclusive)
No.	Title	Length
1.	"Himawari" (向日葵)	4:30
2.	"Cherish"	4:51
3.	"Mirai Taxi" (未来タクシー)	4:10
4.	"Ticket" (チケット)	4:30
5.	"Pocket" (ポケット)	4:51
6.	"Ai" (愛)	6:28
7.	"Pretty Voice"	3:32
8.	"Amai Kimochi Maru Kajiri" (甘い気持ちまるかじり)	4:15
9.	"Sora to Kujira" (空とくじら)	4:42

Love Is Born: 15th Anniversary 2018 - DVD/Blu-ray disc
No.	Title	Length
1.	"Peach"
2.	"Chu-Lip"
3.	"Lucky☆Star"
4.	"Yumekui" (ユメクイ)
5.	"Kuroge Wagyu Joshio Tanyaki 680-en" (黒毛和牛上塩タン焼680円)
6.	"Neko ni Fūsen" (ネコに風船)
7.	"Planetarium" (プラネタリウム)
8.	"Kingyo Hanabi" (金魚花火)
9.	"Pocket" (ポケット)
10.	"Kurage, Nagareboshi" (クラゲ、流れ星)
11.	"Ren'ai Shashin" (恋愛写真)
12.	"Medley" (One×Time / Heart / Daisuki da yo. / I Love xxx / Bīdama / Bye Bye)
13.	"Smily"
14.	"Watashi" (私)
15.	"Amaenbo" (甘えんぼ)
16.	"Re:Name"
17.	"More More" (モアモア)
18.	"Zokkondition" (ゾッ婚ディション)
19.	"Frienger" (フレンジャー)
20.	"Rocket Sneaker" (ロケットスニーカー)
21.	"Happy Days"
22.	"Sakuranbo" (さくらんぼ)
23.	"Momo no Hanabira" (桃ノ花ビラ)
24.	"Dracaena" (ドラセナ)

== Charts ==
Weekly chart performance for Ai Am Best, Too
Chart (2019)	Peak position
Japanese Albums (Oricon)	23
Japanese Top Albums Sales (Billboard Japan)	11
