= Ai Inutsuka One on One Collaboration =

Remix album by Ai Otsuka
- Released: February 3, 2021
- Genres: J-pop, electronic music
- Label: Avex Trax

Ai Otsuka chronology
| Ai Am Best, Too (2019) | Ai Inutsuka One on One Collaboration (2021) | Love Pop (2021) |

Teaser video
- Ai Inutsuka One on One Collaboration on YouTube

Ai Inutsuka One on One Collaboration (犬塚 愛, Inutsuka Ai One on One Collaboration) is a remix album by Japanese singer-songwriter Ai Otsuka. It was released on February 3, 2021, through Avex Trax.

== Background ==
Officially referred to as a remake album, this work is the culmination of a project in which Otsuka released remade versions of her own songs on digital platforms, starting from August 2020, collaborating with a variety of music producers from Japan's electronic music scene.

The album title features a word play, which is something Otsuka tends to do particularly when naming her concert tours. In this particular case, an additional stroke was added to the kanji "Ō" [大] in Ōtsuka's surname, turning it into the kanji of “dog” [犬]. By this addition to her name, Otsuka wanted to represent a fresh twist to her original material through an "ippitsu" (literally “a single brushstroke”), using Japanese calligraphy terms. The “One on One” part of the title is meant to emphasize the collaborative nature of the project, with each producer engaging directly with one of Otsuka's original songs in a one-to-one creative exchange. Furthermore, the homophonic play on One (wan) on One (wan) (with “wan” being the Japanese onomatopoeia for a dog's bark) reinforces the canine motif. Aligned with this concept, the album's cover features Otsuka's pet dog.

Ai Inutsuka One on One Collaboration was preceded by the remixes of "Peach", "Kingyo Hanabi", "Chime", and "Kuroge Wagyu Joshio Tanyaki 680-en", which were previously released as digital singles on a monthly basis from August through November 2020.

The album was released simultaneously with Otsuka's anniversary concert Love Is Born: 17th Anniversary 2020 on DVD/Blu-ray and CD formats.

== Track listing ==
Ai Inutsuka One on One Collaboration - CD, digital release
| No. | Title | Length |
|---|---|---|
| 1. | "Kuroge Wagyu Joshio Tanyaki 680-en" (Maeshima Soshi Remix) | 3:57 |
| 2. | "Mōsō Chop" (Kenmochi Hidefumi Remix) | 3:50 |
| 3. | "Sakuranbo" (Kan Sano Remix) | 3:58 |
| 4. | "Kingyo Hanabi" (Animal Hack Remix) | 3:55 |
| 5. | "Momo no Hanabira" (Mabanua Remix) | 4:15 |
| 6. | "Peach" (Tomggg Remix) | 3:20 |
| 7. | "Smily" (Lucky Kilimanjaro Remix) | 2:19 |
| 8. | "Kimi Fechi" (Haruno Remix) | 4:06 |
| 9. | "Chime" (AmPm Remix) | 4:06 |
| 10. | "Yumekui" (Sasuke Remix) | 5:54 |
| Total length: | | 39:40 |

== Charts ==
Weekly chart performance for Ai Inutsuka One on One Collaboration
| Chart (2021) | Peak position |
|---|---|
| Japanese Albums (Oricon) | 68 |
| Japanese Top Albums Sales (Billboard Japan) | 47 |

== Release history ==
Release dates and formats for Ai Inutsuka One on One Collaboration
| Region | Date | Format(s) | Label(s) | Ref. |
|---|---|---|---|---|
| Various | February 3, 2021 | Digital download | Avex Entertainment | |
| Japan | February 3, 2021 | CD | Avex Trax | |
| Japan | March 26, 2025 | LP | Avex Trax | |
