= Love Is Best =

Compilation album by Ai Otsuka
- Released: November 11, 2009
- Recorded: 2008–2009
- Genre: J-pop
- Label: Avex Trax; AVCD-23921 (Japan, CD+DVD); AVCD-23920 (Japan, CD)
- Producer: Ai Otsuka

Ai Otsuka chronology
Love Letter (2008)	Love Is Best (2009)	Aio Punch (2014)

Love Is Best is the second 'Best of' compilation album by Ai Otsuka, released on 11 November 2009. Its theme is love. It was released in both a CD-only format and a CD+DVD format. Fifteen songs are included. The first press edition came with a pair of eyeglasses called "Love Eyes".

The majority of the songs are taken from Otsuka's past releases, and they are all love songs, keeping with the album's theme. Some songs have been re-recorded specifically for the compilation.

A new song, "Is", was used to promote the album. It was used in TV commercials for Topvalu Heatfact, a company that produces underwear.

Love Is Best was certified Gold by RIAJ for shipment of 100,000 copies.

== Track listing ==
1. "Is"
2. "Aisu×Time" (Collaboration with Su from Rip Slyme)
3. "Daisuki da yo." (大好きだよ。, I Love You.)
4. "Ticket (チケット)"
5. "Kimi Fechi" (君フェチ, Fetish of You)
6. "Heart"
7. "Futatsuboshi Kinenbi: Shinkon Hiyori" (ふたつ星記念日 ～新婚日和～, Two Stars Remembrance Day: Wedding Day)"
8. "Sakuranbo" (さくらんぼ, Cherry)
9. "Strawberry Jam"
10. "Drop."
11. "Amaenbo: Wedding" (甘えんぼ ～Wedding～, Spoiled Child)
12. "Kimi ni Kaeru." (キミにカエル。, Returning To You.)
13. "Amai Kimochi Maru Kajiri" (甘い気持ちまるかじり, A Bite Full of Sweet Feelings)
14. "Renai Shashin: Haru" (恋愛写真 -春-, Love Photograph -Spring-)
15. "Pocket: Last Love Letter" (ポケット ～Last Love Letter～, Pocket)

=== DVD track list ===
1. Is (Music Clip)
2. Aisu×Time (Music Clip)
3. Daisuki da yo. (Music Clip)
4. Heart (Music Clip)
5. Sakuranbo (Music Clip)
6. Amaenbo: Wedding (Music Clip)

== Chart history ==
=== Oricon Sales Chart ===
Release	Oricon Albums Chart	Peak position	Debut sales	Sales total
November 11, 2009	Daily Chart	1	22,895	94,116 copies
November 11, 2009	Weekly Chart	1	56,366	94,116 copies
November 11, 2009	Monthly Chart (November)	5	78,342	94,116 copies
November 11, 2009	Yearly Chart	#105	84,634	94,116 copies
