= Ai Am Best =

"愛 am Best" "AI am Best"

Greatest hits album by Ai Otsuka
- Released: 28 March 2007 (CD+DVD); 26 September 2007 (CD)
- Recorded: 2007
- Genre: J-pop
- Length: 66:05
- Label: Avex Trax; AVCD-23271 (Japan, CD+DVD); AVCD-23406 (Japan, CD)
- Producer: Ai Otsuka

Ai Otsuka chronology
Love Cook (2005)	"愛 am Best" "AI am Best" (2007)	Love Piece (2007)

"Ai am Best" (愛 am Best) is the first "best of" compilation album by Ai Otsuka. The album contains 13 pre-2006 tracks with the respective music video for each. "Ai am Best" was released on March 28, 2007. The title of the album is a pun on her first name, Ai, which is pronounced like the English word "I".

Formats:
CD+DVD and CD.

DVD Track list:
The respective PVs for each of the songs listed for the CD Track list (The Music Clip for Track 13 「Love Music」 is the most recently filmed)

First Pressing comes in a blister case and bundled with <愛ハンコ>, a specially made carved stamp.

The album debuted at the number one spot on the Oricon charts and sold more than 60,000 copies on its first day—six times more than the second place album of the day. By the second day of release, it had already sold over 100,000 copies.

"Ai am Best" was re-released in a CD version limited press on 26 September 2007.

== Secret track ==
There is a secret track at the end of the last track "Love Music". Tracks 14 though 98 are silent and are about 5 seconds each. Track 99 contains an old unreleased song, "Babashi".

The Ai am Best DVD contains a secret hidden track which requires a code to unlock:

With your DVD remote arrow buttons, press "Up" 9 times, then press "Right" 9 times, then press "Down" 9 times, then press "Left" 9 times and finally press "Enter" and the hidden clip will be revealed, "Best of Babashi"

== Track listing ==
CD Track Lists:

1. Momo no hanabira (桃ノ花ビラ, Peach Flower Petals)
2. Sakuranbo (さくらんぼ, Cherry)
3. Amaenbo (甘えんぼ, Spoiled child)
4. Happy Days
5. Kingyo Hanabi (金魚花火, Goldfish Fireworks)
6. Daisuki da yo. (大好きだよ。, I love you.)
7. Kuroge Wagyū Joshio Tan Yaki 680 Yen (黒毛和牛上塩タン焼680円, Salty Grilled Tongue of Black Japanese Beef 680 Yen)
8. Cherish
9. Smily
10. Biidama (ビー玉, Marble)
11. Neko ni Fūsen (ネコに風船, A Cat & A Balloon)
12. Puranetariumu (プラネタリウム, Planetarium)
13. Love Music

CD Hidden/Bonus Track Lists:

14. <Silent>
—- 15...97
98. <Silent>
99. Babashi no Theme (Babashiのテーマ, Babashi's Theme)

DVD Track Lists:

1. 桃ノ花ビラ Music Clip
2. さくらんぼ Music Clip
3. 甘えんぼ Music Clip
4. Happy Days Music Clip
5. 金魚花火 Music Clip
6. 大好きだよ。 Music Clip
7. 黒毛和牛上塩タン焼680円 Music Clip
8. Cherish Music Clip
9. Smily Music Clip
10. ビー玉 Music Clip
11. ネコに風船 Music Clip
12. プラネタリウム Music Clip
13. Love Music Music Clip

DVD Hidden/Bonus Track Lists:

14. Best of Babashi

== Oricon sales charts (Japan) ==
Release	Chart	Peak position	Debut sales	Sales total
March 28, 2007	Oricon Daily Albums Chart	1		
March 28, 2007	Oricon Weekly Albums Chart	1	350,045	727,192
March 28, 2007	Oricon Monthly Albums Chart	1		
March 28, 2007	Oricon Yearly Albums Chart	6		
