= Aio Punch =

EP by Ai Otsuka
- Released: March 26, 2014
- Genres: Jazz; electronic music
- Label: Avex Trax

Ai Otsuka chronology
Love Is Best (2009)	Aio Punch (2014)	Love Fantastic (2014)

Singles from Aio Punch
- 1. "Sakuranbo -Cocktail-" Released: December 4, 2013 (digital)

Aio Punch is an extended play by Japanese singer-songwriter Ai Otsuka. It was released on March 26, 2014, through Avex Trax.

== Background ==
Following the release of her love-song compilation Love Is Best, Otsuka would not release a new album under her real name for approximately four and half years. During this period, she released her first extended play under the name Love, entitled Love It, while between 2012 and 2013, she served as vocalist of the band Rabbit, and they released their first and only album in December 2012.

In 2013, in order to commemorate Otsuka's tenth anniversary in the music industry, on March 19, 2014, Avex released the DVD and Blu-ray Love Is Born 10th Anniversary 2013. This album became the second installment to commemorate such occasion. Aio Punch is a self-cover mini album, including six tracks with completely different arrangements, and new vocals. On her official website, the songs were described as having been "reborn with a mature charm, creating a stylish atmosphere."

Four of the six tracks included on the album are heavily influenced by jazz elements, except the two songs re-arranged by Noboru Abe from Studio Apartment, which are influenced by electronic music. This was the first time Abe collaborated with Otsuka, and he would eventually be in charge of the sound of two studio albums for her in the future, Love Tricky (2015) and Love Honey (2017). All the songs on the album include subtitles referencing drinks, both alcoholic and non-alcoholic.

One month before the release of this EP, an album titled 10th Anniversary Commemorative “Aio Punch” Original Ver. Collection +4 was made available on iTunes, including the original versions of the songs from the album plus four bonus tracks.

== Promotion ==
The album was preceded by the digital single "Sakuranbo -Cocktail-", a re-arranged version of Otsuka's second single. The song was released in December 2013 on digital platforms, and was also performed live on Toyota's online event Toyota Wish presents Kurohaku Uta Gassen on YouTube.

== Track listing ==
All tracks are written by Ai

Aio Punch - CD, digital release
No.	Title	Arranger	Length
1.	"Sakuranbo -Cocktail-" (さくらんぼ ―カクテル―)	Makoto Minagawa	3:49
2.	"Chu-Lip -Mead-" (CHU-LIP ―蜂蜜酒―)	Masanori Sasaji	4:20
3.	"Amaenbo -Tea with Lemon-" (甘えんぼ ―レモンティ―)	Masanori Sasaji	3:47
4.	"Haneari Tamago -Espresso-" (羽ありたまご ―エスプレッソ―)	Noboru Abe	5:02
5.	"Peach -Vodka-" (PEACH ―ウォッカ―)	Makoto Minagawa	3:22
6.	"5:09 a.m. -Tonic-" (5:09 a.m. ―トニック―)	Noboru Abe	4:13
Total length:			24:33

10th Anniversary Commemorative "Aio Punch" Original Ver. Collection +4 - Digital release (Note: The original title in Japanese is "10th Anniversary記念「AIO PUNCH」オリジナルver集+4".)
No.	Title	Length
1.	"Sakuranbo"	3:53
2.	"Amaenbo"	4:12
3.	"Peach"	4:08
4.	"Chu-Lip"	3:55
5.	"5:09 a.m."	2:51
6.	"Haneari Tamago"	4:55
7.	"Momo no Hanabira"	4:53
8.	"Planetarium"	5:07
9.	"Daisuki da yo."	4:42
10.	"Yumekui"	5:16

== Charts ==
Weekly chart performance for Aio Punch
Chart (2014)	Peak position
Japanese Albums (Oricon)	67
