= Love Tricky =

- CD-only edition cover

Studio album by Ai Otsuka
- Released: April 22, 2015
- Genre: J-pop, electronic music
- Label: Avex Trax
- Producer: aio

Ai Otsuka chronology
| Love Fantastic (2014) | Love Tricky (2015) | Love Honey (2017) |

Love Tricky is the seventh studio album by Japanese singer-songwriter Ai Otsuka. It was released on April 22, 2015, through Avex Trax.

Released following a nine-month gap after her previous album, Love Fantastic, this record was officially described as a "reset of everything you knew about Ai Otsuka", as it became her first studio album to be primarily based on electronic music, marking a complete departure from the pop-rock sound that had characterized Otsuka's music since her debut.

== Development and concept ==
In the early stages of her career, Otsuka made a conscious decision to focus on commercially viable music, prioritizing what she described as sing-along songs suited for karaoke culture—a major measure of popularity in Japan at the time. Although her personal taste leaned toward more "stylish" or fashion-forward music, she believed that such sounds were not considered mainstream in the Japanese pop landscape of the early 2000s. At the time, audiences largely gravitated toward songs that were easy to sing communally, often favoring vocal-driven pop performed by traditional singers rather than singer-songwriters. Otsuka assessed that debuting with a more stylistic, niche musical approach would limit her exposure and commercial success. As a result, she deliberately chose to pursue the "orthodox J-pop" path, focusing on catchy, accessible singles that would appeal to the masses and thrive in the karaoke market. Despite this strategic approach, she did not abandon her artistic inclinations. Despite this strategic approach, she did not abandon her artistic inclinations. Otsuka gradually embedded her preferred musical style into her albums, using them as a platform to experiment with alternative sounds and production techniques. This slow but intentional shift in direction eventually led to her fifth studio album, Love Letter, which marked a clearer move toward her personal artistic vision.

However, she remained uncertain whether her natural voice would suit electronic music. As a creative workaround, she released electro-style tracks under a different name (i.e., Love), experimenting with ways to distance her vocal identity from the genre. Her exploration eventually led her to join the collaborative group Rabbit, where she actively tested how her voice could interact with electronic sounds. The experience was a turning point; she discovered an approach that felt authentic without needing to disguise her voice.However, changes in the Japanese music industry altered Otsuka's approach as well. During her time in Rabbit, Otsuka also began experimenting on a new way of creating music with others, namely receiving somebody else's base track, to which she would add melodies and write lyrics for. Regarding this, Otsuka declared on this new process: "It was really fun. Usually I start from zero, but this time, I had a “1” to work from. That limited my choices but also made it feel like I was borrowing someone else’s starting point. I liked that a lot. So I started looking for someone to work with in that way" This experimentation eventually gave her the confidence to pursue a full album in that style and to seek a collaborator who could help bring the vision to life. Around the same time, fellow Japanese group Perfume rose to massive popularity with a similar electro-pop sound, and Otsuka admitted to halting her efforts temporarily out of concern that she would be accused of being a copycat. Still, her interest in the genre persisted, and she continued exploring ways to blend her vocals with electronic elements on her own terms.

Songs to sing and songs to listen to. Before my debut, I used to classify songs as such. The image that the public has of me is probably that of songs to sing. Upon analyzing myself, I concluded that songs that people could sing at karaoke were more likely to capture the public's interest. Thus, I selected and released these as singles. On the other hand, the music I personally enjoyed listening to was often placed in albums, but I also released it under a different name or kept it quietly to myself. Upon my involvement in Rabbit learning how to create music with others, and discovering the joy of collaboration, I met cap [Noboru Abe] from Studio Apartment about two years ago. This encounter made me want to explore the music I listen to more deeply, which led to the creation of this album.

– Otsuka on developing Love Tricky, Billboard

The key to bringing this vision to life was finding the right collaborator. After keeping an ear out for potential creative partners, Otsuka came across Noboru Abe, also known as cap, from electronic duo Studio Apartment. Impressed by what she heard about his personality and musical sensibility, she reached out directly—even before the album had a confirmed release plan. To her surprise, Abe readily agreed to work with her. Otsuka first collaborated with Noboru Abe on her 2014 mini-album Aio Punch, where he re-arranged her songs "Haneari Tamago" and "5:09 a.m.". Their collaboration proved fruitful from the outset. Otsuka described Abe as open-minded and responsive, often bringing new ideas to the table that expanded the creative direction of the songs. His willingness to suggest alternative approaches to her concepts—what she described as offering a "Plan B"—allowed the project to evolve in unexpected and exciting ways. She also appreciated his approachable demeanor, noting that his constant wide-eyed expression and gentle personality made their sessions comfortable and productive, even for someone like her who tends to be shy. Their work together ultimately resulted in this record, which according to Otsuka represents the culmination of twelve years in the making.

For this album, Abe co-wrote and produced all the songs, which also marks Otsuka’s first album in which she co-composed every track, instead of being the sole writer of her material. On the creative process, Otsuka explained that Abe would send over one-minute clips of potential tracks, then she would add vocals, send it back, and then they would go back and forth until a song was finished. Otsuka declared that this shift required her to respond intuitively to instrumentals created by others, drawing new ideas and vocal expressions from within herself. She likened the experience more to "singing play" than traditional songwriting, with vocals serving not just as lyrical expression but as part of the sonic palette—akin to a synthesizer layered within the music.

About the making of the album, Otsuka described the project as both a creative departure and a personal challenge. The songwriting process spanned roughly two years, while the recording itself was completed in a rapid, one-month sprint, an unusual contrast that left her unsure whether the entire experience felt long or short. Regardless of the timeline, she characterized the process as deeply enjoyable and creatively fulfilling. As to what she expected from the album, rather than solely appealing to her existing fanbase, she expressed a desire for the album to “knock on the doors” of those who previously held a negative impression of her or her music, highlighting the album's role as a fresh start or reintroduction to her evolving artistry. As for the album title, Otsuka explained: "I’ve always liked tricky things. Back when I debuted, especially on my first and second albums, I was kind of embarrassed to do “normal” music. I did not want people to say, “Oh, that’s a nice song” and that was it. Looking back, I had a lot of songs where even I wonder what I was thinking [...] But this album feels very honest and musical —so much so that to me, it feels tricky. That’s why I chose the title."

Among the ten tracks on the album, the song “reach for the moon” stands out as the only song specifically tailored for commercial purposes. While the rest of the album explores a stylish, electro-based sound reflecting Otsuka's personal artistic evolution, this track was created to fulfill a client’s request tied to a commercial campaign. The song’s development process differed notably from rest, as Otsuka revealed that the commercial use was confirmed before the song was written, and early demos she submitted were rejected as they were too "stylish." The client had asked for something closer to kayōkyoku, or Japanese popular songs. As a result, Otsuka began creating the song using a pre-existing melody from her personal archive rather than composing to a new track by Abe. To bring the song in line with the album’s refined aesthetic, she requested Abe adjust the chords and arrangements.

== Release ==
Love Tricky was released on CD+DVD and CD-only formats. If purchased through Otsuka's official fan club, it came with a bonus CD featuring two remixes.

== Promotion ==
Love Tricky became Otsuka's first album to not feature commercial singles to promote it. A promotional music video featuring all the album tracks was published on Avex' Official YouTube account on April 3, 2014. Additionally, two of its songs were used in advertisement campaigns. The song “End and And ~10,000 Hearts~”, was used as a campaign song for NTT West’s Smart Hikari Heart Beat Project. Otsuka was appointed ambassador for this project in June 2014, and she created this song using 10,000 heartbeats that were collected this past October via a mobile app/t-shirt combination. On the other hand, the song "Reach For The Moon" was featured on a TV commercial by Japanese company Eyeful Home entitled "The Past and the Future" (過去とこれから編).

== Track listing ==
All tracks are written by aio and cap (Noboru Abe from Studio Apartment).

Love Tricky - CD, digital release
| No. | Title | Length |
|---|---|---|
| 1. | "Time Machine" (タイムマシーン) | 5:12 |
| 2. | "Laugh" | 4:22 |
| 3. | "Summer Lovely Days" | 4:09 |
| 4. | "Affair" | 3:22 |
| 5. | "I'm Lonely" | 4:02 |
| 6. | "Reach For The Moon" | 5:36 |
| 7. | "Shooting Star" | 4:42 |
| 8. | "Parallel World" (パラレルワールド) | 4:03 |
| 9. | "Busy Lady" | 4:34 |
| 10. | "End and And ~10,000 Hearts~" | 5:21 |
| Total length: | | 45:23 |

Love Tricky - Fan club bonus CD
| No. | Title | Length |
|---|---|---|
| 1. | "Sakuranbo" (cap mix) |
| 2. | "Yumekui" (cap mix) |

Love Tricky - DVD
| No. | Title | Length |
|---|---|---|
| 1. | "Love Tricky" (Music Clips) |
| 2. | "Toilet Paper Blues" (from Love Is Born: 11th Anniversary 2014) |
| 3. | "One×Time" (from Love Is Born: 11th Anniversary 2014) |
| 4. | "Smily" (from Love Is Born: 11th Anniversary 2014) |
| 5. | "Shachihata" (from Love Is Born: 11th Anniversary 2014) |
| 6. | "Tokyo Midnight" (from Love Is Born: 11th Anniversary 2014) |
| 7. | "Love Tricky" (Special Interview) |

== Charts ==
Weekly chart performance for Love Tricky
| Chart (2015) | Peak position |
|---|---|
| Japanese Albums (Oricon) | 24 |
| Japanese Top Albums Sales (Billboard Japan) | 33 |
