= Kurage, Nagareboshi =

"クラゲ、流れ星" "Kurage, Nagareboshi" / "Jellyfish, Shooting Star"

Single by Ai Otsuka

from the album Love Letter
- B-side: "H2O"
- Released: September 10, 2008
- Recorded: 2008
- Genre: J-pop
- Label: Avex Trax
- Songwriter: Ai Otsuka

Ai Otsuka singles chronology
"Rocket Sneaker / One × Time" (2007)	"クラゲ、流れ星" "Kurage, Nagareboshi" / "Jellyfish, Shooting Star" (2008)	"Bye Bye" (2009)

Alternative cover
- CD + DVD cover

"Kurage, Nagareboshi" (クラゲ、流れ星; "Jellyfish, Shooting Star") is Japanese pop singer Ai Otsuka's 18th single, released on 10 September 2008. It will include a CD-only and CD + DVD format, as well as four different covers to celebrate her 5-year anniversary. There will be a 5th anniversary limited edition CD-only and CD + DVD version, as well as regular CD-only and CD + DVD versions. It is described as a "heartwarming ballad for the summer". The 5th anniversary covers pay homage to the covers of her debut single, "Momo no hanabira", whose release this single is meant to commemorate. Kurage, Nagareboshi is similar in style to "Kingyo Hanabi" and "Planetarium"; people often group the three songs together. It was used as the theme song for the TBS series, Koisuru Hanikami!.

The first pressing will include a written comment card and a jacket sticker.

== Track listing ==
All tracks are written by Ai Otsuka.

CD
No.	Title	Arranger(s)	Length
1.	"Kurage, Nagareboshi (クラゲ、流れ星; Jellyfish, Shooting Star)"	Ai×Ikoman	4:52
2.	"H2O"	Ai×Ikoman	3:27
3.	"Ame no Tsubu, Waltz: Love Music (雨の粒、ワルツ ~Love Music~; Raindrops, A Waltz: Love Music)"	Ai×Ikoman, Strings arrangement： Mio Okamura	4:09
4.	"Kurage, Nagareboshi (クラゲ、流れ星; Jellyfish, Shooting Star)" (Instrumental)	Ai×Ikoman	4:52
5.	"H2O" (Instrumental)	Ai×Ikoman	3:27

DVD
No.	Title	Length
1.	"Kurage, Nagare Boshi (クラゲ、流れ星; Jellyfish, Shooting Star)" (Music video)

"Kurage, Nagareboshi" is a ballad to mark the end of the summer. "H2O" is an upbeat pop/rock song, as an upbeat song is often released with a ballad single to equalize the mood [the same vice versa—i.e. "Happy Days" had "Hoshikuzu" and "Rocket Sneaker / One × Time" had "One × Time"]. "Ame no Tsubu, Waltz: Love Music" is a new song reprising the chorus of "Love Music" found on Love Cook.

== 5th anniversary covers ==
5th anniversary CD-only cover

5th anniversary CD + DVD cover

== Charts ==
=== Oricon sales charts (Japan) ===
Release	Chart	Peak position	Sales total
September 10, 2008	Oricon Daily Chart	3	46,846
