= Watashi (song) =

- CD+DVD and digital edition cover

Single by Ai Otsuka

from the album Love Honey
- Language: Japanese
- Released: February 8, 2017 (digital); February 15, 2017 (physical)
- Genre: J-pop, electronic music
- Length: 3:47
- Label: Avex Trax
- Songwriter(s): Aio

Ai Otsuka singles chronology
"Hibi, Ikiteireba" (2016)	"Watashi" (2017)	"Dracaena" (2018)

Music video
- "Watashi" on YouTube

"Watashi" (私, lit. 'I' or 'Myself') is a song by Japanese singer-songwriter Ai Otsuka. The song was released as a digital single on February 8, 2017, and later as a physical single on February 15, 2017, through Avex Trax.

== Background and release ==
"Watashi" was written specifically for the Fuji TV drama series Kirawareru Yūki (The Courage to be Disliked), a detective drama inspired by the 2013 best-selling book of the same name. This marked Otsuka's first providing a theme song for a television drama in approximately nine years, since her song "Peach" was used in the 2007 series Hanazakari no Kimitachi e: Ikemen Paradise. The TV drama featuring the song premiered on January 12, 2017.

The single was released on digital platforms on February 8, 2017. The physical single, which became her first single release on physical formats in approximately two years and nine months since "More More", was released on February 15 of the same year. Apart from the title track, the single included the song “Sakura Harahara”, which was used as part of the interactive digital art exhibition Flowers by Naked 2017 -Risshun-, and another new song entitled "Josei Shelter". The single was released in four formats: CD only, CD+DVD, CD+book, and CD+goods. The DVD included the music video for the title track plus behind the scenes footage; the book is a style book conceptualized by Otsuka herself. The version featuring goods was sold exclusively through her official fan club and the mu-mo shop, and included mobile charger.

== Composition and themes ==
"Watashi" is a mid-tempo song with electronic elements, written by Otsuka and co-arranged by herself and Noboru Abe from Studio Apartment. Otsuka collaborated closely with the drama’s producers to create a song that aligned with both the drama's themes and her own artistic vision. The production team requested a track that would suit the drama’s closing moments, inspiring listeners "to take a step forward." Otsuka created an up-tempo song that reflects the fearless and independent character of Ranko Ando, protagonist of the story, who lives freely without concern for others' disapproval. The lyrics incorporate Otsuka’s distinctive wordplay to capture Ranko’s emotions and personality. She drew inspiration from Adlerian philosophy on which the story is based, particularly the idea of living free from the others' expectations and judgments, emphasizing the importance of living one’s own life rather than being swayed by external opinions. Otsuka stated, “Living while worrying about others’ opinions is ultimately living someone else’s life. It’s your life, so focus on who you are now and what you want to do, and live for yourself.”

The song’s composition reflects this theme, evoking the image of a strong woman walking forward confidently. Its tempo mirrors a walking rhythm, with a groove designed to inspire listeners to take bold steps. The arrangement incorporates strings and synthesizer sounds, complemented by Otsuka’s vocals. Karina Nose, who played Ando in the drama, praised the song and recognized how well it suited her character, stating that the song provided her with courage. The drama’s producer also praised the song, noting its “powerful sense of a woman moving forward without hesitation” and its “mysterious floating quality,” describing it as an uplifting anthem that drives you to feel courageous.

== Track listing ==
All tracks are written by Aio.

Watashi - CD+DVD, digital single
No.	Title	Length
1.	"Watashi" (私)	3:47
2.	"Sakura Hara Hara" (サクラハラハラ)	4:30
3.	"Joshi Shelter" (女子シェルター)	4:13
Total length:		12:22

Watashi - CD-only edition bonus tracks
No.	Title	Length
4.	"Watashi" (Instrumental)	3:46
5.	"Sakura Hara Hara" (Instrumental)	4:30
6.	"Joshi Shelter" (Instrumental)	4:13
Total length:		25:05

== Personnel ==
Credits adapted from the liner notes of the CD single.

- Aio (Ai Otsuka) – vocals, songwriting, arrangements
- Cap (Noboru Abe) – programming, arrangements, other instruments
- Gen Ittetsu Strings – strings (1)
- Gen Ittetsu – strings arrangements (1)
- Mana Yoshinaga – koto (2)
