= Action 10.5 =

Single by Ai Otsuka

from the album Love Fantastic
- Language: Japanese
- Released: August 18, 2010
- Genre: J-pop
- Length: 4:34
- Label: Avex Trax
- Songwriter(s): Ai

Ai Otsuka singles chronology
"Zokkondition / Lucky Star" (2010)	"Action 10.5" (2010)	"I Love xxx" (2010)

"Action 10.5" (アクション10.5(テン・ハーフ), Akushon Ten Hāfu) is a song by Japanese singer-songwriter Ai Otsuka, released as a digital single on August 18, 2010, through Avex Trax.

== Background and release ==
Approximately three months after the release of the single "Zokkondition/Lucky Star", Otsuka announced her marriage to Su from Rip Slyme on June 26, 2010, through her official website. On July 16, 2010, merely two weeks after the aforementioned news, "Action 10.5" was announced as a new song that would be featured on a television commercial for the cellphone Docomo Style Series P-06B by Panasonic.

The song was ultimately released on digital platforms on August 18, 2010.

Otsuka premiered "Action 10.5" live during the Avex A-Nation tour held in August 2010, as it was performed as the leading song of her setlist during the tour. Subsequently, she also performed the song during her own anniversary concert Love Is Born: 7th Anniversary 2010 held on September 11 and 12, 2010, during which she also announced her pregnancy to her fans.

"Action 10.5" was released on a physical format for the first time approximately four years after its original release, upon being included on Otsuka's studio album Love Fantastic in 2014.

== Composition and themes ==
"Action 10.5" is a mid-tempo song written and composed by Otsuka under the pen name Ai, and co-arranged by herself and Ikoman. Its lyrics convey an optimistic motif, and Otsuka described it as "Even if the results of what you're working hard on right now do not show up immediately, [this is] a support song that says they will surely appear in some form across time." The "10.5" of the title is meant to be read as "ten half", as she also sings in the track.

== Track listing ==
All tracks are written by Ai.

Action 10.5 - Digital release
No.	Title	Length
1.	"Action 10.5" (アクション10.5)	4:34
