= Dear, You =

Single by Ai Otsuka

from the album Ai Am Best, Too
- Language: Japanese
- Released: October 4, 2018
- Genre: J-pop
- Length: 5:29
- Label: Avex Trax
- Songwriter(s): Aio
- Producer(s): Seiji Kameda

Ai Otsuka singles chronology
"Dracaena" (2018)	"Dear, You" (2018)	"Chime" (2021)

"Dear, You" is a song by Japanese singer-songwriter Ai Otsuka, released as a digital single on October 4, 2018, through Avex Trax.

== Background and release ==
"Dear, You" was released as the theme song for the stage play Kare Phone, a romantic fantasy drama written and directed by Osamu Suzuki which premiered on October 4, 2018. This marked Otsuka's first venture into composing a theme song for a stage play.

The song was written and composed and Otsuka, while it was arranged and produced by Seiji Kameda. It originated from a melody Otsuka composed at the age of fifteen, which she described as her first-ever musical creation. Reflecting on the song's origins, Otsuka noted that its youthful composition carries a dreamy and idealistic tone, characteristic of her early songwriting. The lyrics draw from personal and relatable experiences, evoking memories of her teenage years. Upon receiving the offer to compose the theme song, Otsuka expressed initial apprehension, stating, "Honestly, I wondered if I was up to the task, but I wanted to embrace this new challenge and create something special." Encouraged by Suzuki's request to capture the poignant emotions of a young woman's love story, Otsuka crafted a track that complements the play's bittersweet narrative.

The song was broadcast in full for the first time on a Line Live streaming on July 21, 2018, as part of a special program dedicated to Kare Phone.

The single was released on digital platforms on October 4, 2018, coinciding with the premiere of Kare Phone. The digital single includes a piano instrumental version of the song which was used in the production.

"Dear, You" was ultimately included as the only new song featured on Otsuka's 2019 greatest hits album Ai Am Best, Too.

== Track listing ==
All tracks are written by Aio.

Dear, You - Digital release
No.	Title	Length
1.	"Dear, You"	5:29
2.	"Dear, You" (Piano Instrumental)	5:10
3.	"Dear, You" (Instrumental)	5:29
Total length:		16:07
