= Studio Apartment (band) =

Japanese electronic music duo

- Origin: Japan
- Genres: House; dance
- Years active: 2000–present
- Labels: RD Records; New World Records; Apt.; EMI Music Japan; N.E.O.N
- Members: Masanori Morita; Noboru Abe
- Past members: Shinji Sato
- Website: studioapartment.jp

Studio Apartment is a Japanese electronic music duo, formed in 2000 by DJ and music producer Masanori Morita, and keyboardist Noboru Abe.

== Biography ==
Studio Apartment initially began as a three-member group including a bassist, focusing on a Brazilian bossa crossover style. They released their debut album Paraiso Terrestre in April 2002.

With the release of their 2004 album World Line, the band gained considerable recognition not only in the Japanese dance music scene, but also internationally. Their song “Flight” featuring Monique Bingham on vocals became a worldwide hit, and from there, they continued to produce house tracks. Over time, noted house music singers like Kenny Bobien, Stephanie Cooke, Kimara Lovelace, and AK helped solidify SA's support worldwide.

In 2006, they established their own dance music labels, Apt. and Apt. International. Through these labels, they have released works by Japanese artists such as Daishi Dance and Hideo Kobayashi. They have also released works from global house music icons such as Dennis Ferrer, Kerri Chandler, and Jerome Sydenham, helping introduce world-standard dance music to Japanese audiences. They have released music through international labels such as Defected Records in the United Kingdom, and King Street Sounds in the United States.

In 2007, they crossed over to the mainstream Japanese pop scene, after being commissioned to remix "Rock The Party" by Double, "Bubble Strip" by Anna Tsuchiya, in addition to producing Ami Suzuki's song "Bitter..." for her album Dolce.

In 2012, they signed a deal with EMI Music Japan (currently Universal Music Japan) to release their album Nihon no Uta, which solidified their intentions to go mainstream, as they included songs aimed mainly at J-pop listeners, featuring appearances by Su from Rip Slyme, Meisa Kuroki, Kishidan, May J., TRF, and Miyavi, among others.

In 2014, they composed and produced the song "Hohoemi Mode" by Japanese voice actress Kana Hanazawa.

In 2020, the duo released 2020~, their first studio album in eight years.

== Solo projects ==
In 2015, Noboru Abe participated as sound creator on Ai Otsuka's album Love Tricky, where he also co-wrote all its songs.

In 2021, Abe began his solo side project under the name roiro.

== Discography ==
=== Studio albums ===
- Paraiso Terrestre (2002)
- World Line (2004)
- People to People (2005)
- For Her For Him For You (2007)
- 2010 (2010)
- Nihon no Uta (2012)
- 2020~ (2020)
