= Dracaena (song) =

- Digital edition cover

Single by Ai Otsuka

from the album Love Pop
- Language: Japanese
- Released: June 16, 2018 (digital); September 5, 2018 (physical)
- Genre: J-pop, anime song
- Length: 5:44
- Label: Avex Trax
- Songwriter(s): Aio

Ai Otsuka singles chronology
"Watashi" (2017)	"Dracaena" (2018)	"Dear, You" (2018)

Music video
- "Dracaena" on YouTube

"Dracaena" (ドラセナ, Dorasena) is a song by Japanese singer-songwriter Ai Otsuka. The song was released as a digital single on June 16, 2018, and later on physical format on September 5, 2018, through Avex Trax.

== Background and release ==
"Dracaena" was Otsuka's first release of 2018 and her first song in approximately a year, marking the start of her fifteenth anniversary celebrations as an artist. Otsuka debuted "Dracaena" live in concert during her Aio Piano Vol. 5 concert held at Tokyo's Cotton Club on March 2, 2018. During the encore of the show, Otsuka introduced the song, sharing its inspiration: "Through meetings and partings, I’ve learned that we can’t always meet again, so I’ve come to value connections with others, and that feels like happiness."

The song was used as ending theme for the anime series Pikachin-Kit (Pochi tto Hatsumei Pikachin Kit) which aired on TV Tokyo. The TV anime-sized version of "Dracaena" aired on April 7, 2018, and becoming available for download and streaming on various music platforms the same day.

The single was released two formats: a standard CD edition and a limited edition CD+DVD+picture book set, which included the 32-page picture book entitled Kimi to Boku, illustrated by Otsuka. The limited edition DVD contains the music video for "Dracaena," while a special piano version of the song, recorded live during Otsuka's Aio Piano Vol. 5 tour, was included as a bonus CD for fans purchasing both editions through her official fan club. Apart from "Dracaena", the single includes b-side "Akkan Be", which was written as the theme song for the dTV original drama Kongai Renai ni Nita Mono (Something Like Extramarital Love), is a playful, upbeat song that showcases Otsuka's signature whimsical style, being described as an empowering anthem for women navigating the complexities of love and relationships. The song was released as a digital single on April 7, 2018, alongside the TV anime-sized version of "Dracaena." The third song included on the single, "RounD", is a self-cover of the song that Otsuka provided for Shiori Tomita for her 2015 album Moshimo World.

The song was first included on the greatest hits compilation Ai Am Best, Too, and also on Otsuka's 9th studio album Love Pop.

== Composition and themes ==
Written and composed by Otsuka, "Dracaena" is a medium-tempo ballad that reflects on finding happiness in everyday life and cherishing human connections. The title refers to the dracaena plant, known as the "tree of happiness," which Otsuka herself has grown. Lyrically, the song conveys the message that the key to happiness lies within oneself and is often found in everyday interactions and relationships. Otsuka has described the song as an expression of the joy derived from wishing for the happiness of loved ones, stating, "When wishing for the happiness of someone important becomes your own happiness, I think that’s when you touch love."

== Music video ==
The music video for "Dracaena" was released on iTunes on July 2, 2018, and reached the number one spot on the iTunes Music Video Chart on its debut day.

== Track listing ==
All tracks are written by Aio.

Dracaena (TV anime size ver.) - Digital release
No.	Title	Length
1.	"Dracaena" (ドラセナ) (TV anime size ver.)	1:26

Dracaena - Digital release
No.	Title	Length
1.	"Dracaena" (ドラセナ)	5:44
2.	"Akkan Be" (あっかん べ)	3:53
3.	"RounD"	5:03
Total length:		14:27

Dracaena - CD single
No.	Title	Length
1.	"Dracaena"	5:44
2.	"Akkan Be" (あっかん べ)	3:52
3.	"RounD"	5:03
4.	"Dracaena" (Instrumental)	5:43
5.	"Akkan Be" (Instrumental)	3:52
6.	"RounD" (Instrumental)	5:00
Total length:		29:16

Dracaena - Limited edition DVD
No.	Title	Length
1.	"Dracaena" (Music Video)	5:45
2.	"Memories of Love Honey Theater Tour: Eigakan de ē ga na!" (映画館でえーがな!)

Dracaena - Fan-club edition bonus CD
No.	Title	Length
1.	"Dracaena" (Aio Piano Vol. 5)
