= I Love xxx (song) =

Single by Ai Otsuka

from the album Love Fantastic
- Language: Japanese
- Released: September 8, 2010
- Genre: J-pop
- Length: 5:03
- Label: Avex Trax
- Songwriter(s): Aio

Ai Otsuka singles chronology
"Action 10.5" (2010)	"I Love xxx" (2010)	"Re:Name" (2013)

Music video
- "I Love xxx" on YouTube

"I Love xxx" (I ♥ ×××(アイ・ラヴ), Ai Ravu) is a song by Japanese singer-songwriter Ai Otsuka, released as her twenty-first single on September 8, 2010, through Avex Trax.

== Conception and themes ==
"I Love xxx" is a ballad with choir elements, which conveys love and appreciation for cherished elements of life, such as your family, friends, as well as elements of nature such as the stars and the moon. Otsuka described the song as having the simplest lyrics among her works, paired with a melody designed to be accessible and singable for a wide audience. Unlike typical pop song structures with distinct verse, pre-chorus, and chorus sections, the song adopts an unconventional "chorus-heavy" arrangement, which Otsuka playfully referred to as a "surreal, transformative play." The lyrics were written spontaneously, with Otsuka listing words and concepts that evoke universal beauty. The song's creation was inspired by Otsuka's desire to craft a piece that diverges from the rigid, formal style typically associated with choral music. Initially, she found the task of composing for a choir daunting, citing her unfamiliarity with traditional choral songs and referencing classics like "Tsubasa o Kudasai" as her only point of reference. After researching past songs used in the NHK choir competition, including those by artists like Dreams Come True, Otsuka felt challenged by the "orthodox" style of choral music. Ultimately, she drew inspiration from gospel music, envisioning a joyful, communal singing experience akin to a church choir. She aimed to create a song that would allow performers to sing with genuine emotion and freedom, breaking away from the strict, synchronized performances often seen in choir competitions.

== Promotion ==
The song was the appointed song for the junior high school division of the 77th NHK National School Music Competition (known as N-Kon in Japan), and was also featured as the August-September 2025 song for NHK's family program Minna no Uta. As the theme for the 77th NHK National School Music Competition’s junior high school division, "I Love xxx" was performed by student choirs across Japan. Its selection for Minna no Uta further amplified its reach, with the song accompanied by an animated video.

== Track listing ==
All tracks are written by Ai.

I Love xxx - CD, digital release
No.	Title	Length
1.	"I Love xxx" (I ♥ ×××)	5:03
2.	"I Love xxx" (Instrumental)	5:03
Total length:		10:06
