= Graine =

EP by Ai Otsuka
- Released: July 17, 2024
- Recorded: 2024
- Genre: Instrumental music
- Label: Avex Trax
- Producer: Aio

Ai Otsuka chronology
Marble (2023)	Graine (2024)

Graine (stylized in lowercase) is an extended play by Japanese singer-songwriter Ai Otsuka. It was released on July 17, 2024, through Avex Trax. It marks Otsuka’s first full piano instrumental work and was created as part of her activities celebrating the twentieth anniversary of her debut in the music industry.

== Background and release ==
Since her debut in 2003, Otsuka has become known for a series of hit songs such as "Sakuranbo" and "Planetarium," as well as for her wide-ranging creative pursuits including songwriting for other artists, publishing picture books, illustrations, and novels.

In 2023, to commemorate her twentieth anniversary, Otsuka hosted her first solo art exhibition, entitled Ai Otsuka 20th Anniversary Art Exhibition Aio Art, at Spiral Garden in Tokyo. In conjunction with this exhibition, she released a special pamphlet entitled Aio Art, which featured a collection of oil paintings inspired by her own songs. Bundled with the pamphlet was the Graine CD, which was made available exclusively through Avex' online store mu-mo beginning on July 17, and physically at the exhibition venue starting July 18.

Simultaneously, Graine was made available on major music streaming services starting July 17, 2023. Along with the digital release, the music video for the track "un," the opening piece on the EP, was published on YouTube.

== Composition ==
The EP features six piano pieces composed and performed by Otsuka, showcasing her close relationship with the instrument, which has been a significant part of her live performances since her debut. The music emphasizes a deep, personal expression through minimalist piano arrangements. According to Otsuka, it represents "the purest, most essential core" of her music.

== Track listing ==
All tracks are written by Aio.

Graine - CD, digital release
No.	Title	Length
1.	"Un"	1:06
2.	"Deux"	5:58
3.	"Trois"	1:07
4.	"Kawa" (河)	3:27
5.	"Sei" (星)	3:31
6.	"Ao" (碧)	6:10
Total length:		21:22

== Release history ==
Release dates and formats for Graine
Region	Date	Format(s)	Label(s)	Ref.
Various	July 17, 2023	Digital download	Avex Music Creative	
Japan	July 17, 2023	CD (enclosed with Aio Art)	Avex Trax	
