= Love Fantastic =

Studio album by Ai Otsuka
- Released: July 16, 2014
- Recorded: 2010–2014
- Genre: J-pop
- Label: Avex Trax
- Producer: Ai Otsuka

Ai Otsuka chronology
Aio Punch (2014)	Love Fantastic (2014)	Love Tricky (2015)

Alternative cover CD + Blu-ray

Singles from Love Fantastic
- 1. "Zokkondition / Lucky Star" Released: 7 April 2010; 2. "I Love xxx" Released: 8 Sep 2010; 3. "Re:Name" Released: 9 October 2013; 4. "More More" Released: 21 May 2014

Love Fantastic is the sixth studio album released by Ai Otsuka on 16 July 2014. It was her first album released in 6 years, as the previous one—Love Letter—was released in 2008.

The album reached #22 on the weekly Oricon chart, and it continued to rank for a total of five weeks. Love Fantastic is Otsuka's first studio record to chart outside of Oricon's Top 20. It was also her first album to not receive a certification.

== Track listing ==
Trakclist from Ai's official website.

All tracks are written by Ai.

No.	Title	Arranger(s)	Length
1.	"Love Fantastic"		4:25
2.	"More More" (モアモア)		3:33
3.	"Lucky Star"		4:26
4.	"Chu×Chu"		4:02
5.	"Gomen Ne" (ごめんね,"I'm Sorry)		4:46
6.	"Mawari Mawaru Mawareba Mawaro" (マワリ廻るマワレバ回ろ; Spin, Spinning, If It Spins, Let's Spin)		5:45
7.	"Rai Rai" (ライライ; Thunder Thunder)		4:10
8.	"Action 10.5" (アクション10.5)		4:32
9.	"9"		4:42
10.	"Zokkondition" (ゾッ婚ディション; Marriage Condition From My Heart)	AixIkoman	4:05
11.	"I Love xxx" (I♥×××)	AixIkoman	5:02
12.	"Re:NAME"	Ai×Ikoman	4:53
