= Marble (EP) =

- Digital and CD-only edition cover

EP by Ai Otsuka
- Released: September 9, 2023
- Recorded: 2023
- Genre: J-pop, electronic music, soft rock, folk pop
- Label: Avex Trax

Ai Otsuka chronology
Love Pop (2021)	Marble (2023)	Graine (2024)

Singles from Marble
- 1. "Vanity" Released: July 14, 2023 (digital); 2. "Freeky" Released: August 9, 2023 (digital)

Marble is an extended play by Japanese singer-songwriter Ai Otsuka. It was released on September 9, 2023, through Avex Trax.

== Background ==
Otsuka's long-running custom of naming her albums Love xx, became a defining feature of her discography, culminating with the release of Love Pop, her ninth studio album in 2021. Upon completing Love Pop, Otsuka explained that she felt a sense of closure, stating, “I had a sense that the Love xx series, which started with Love Punch, had come to an end for me with Love Pop,” she said. “If I were to create something outside of that flow, I felt the time was now.” Additionally, Otsuka acknowledged a personal development that further encouraged this creative shift. She noted that over time she had grown more comfortable with communication and interacting openly with others - a change that made the prospect of collaborative work particularly appealing at this stage in her life and career. Otsuka explained this aspect by stating, "I feel like I have finally grown as a person and become able to communicate with others. If I had been younger, I think it would've been difficult to create something together with other artists."

The album commemorates her twentieth anniversary in the music industry, and it is officially referred to as her first original collaboration album (although technically it is an EP). For the first time in Otsuka's career, she did not compose any of the songs to be included on one of her records, and was only involved in writing the lyrics for four of the tracks. According to Otsuka, the decision to embark on this new musical endeavor was not necessarily prompted by the anniversary itself. Rather, the timing happened to coincide with a natural turning point in her creative journey.

Marble marks a new approach in Otsuka's career, in that her voice becomes for the first time the cohesive force between the seven songs included, which come from seven different musicians. Otsuka explained that for much of her career, she believed her lack of a distinct vocal identity was, paradoxically, her defining characteristic. "I thought that 'having no individuality was my individuality,'" she reflected. However, the process of recording Marble, which features a wide range of songs written by different people, prompted a new realization. "Even though the songs were so varied, once I sang them, they all naturally came together sounding like me." That experience finally made her realize that she does have a true individuality after all. The album includes seven tracks, each distinct in musical style. Otsuka suggested that the experience gained from her previous works may have played a crucial role in shaping the album. She humorously described herself as a “chameleon singer,” likening her ability to adapt to various styles to that of a chameleon actor, demonstrating her versatility in handling such a wide array of musical genres. As for the selection process of the collaborators involved in Marble, Otsuka explained: "I reached out to artists whom I deeply respect, people whose songwriting I have long admired and whose songs I had always wanted to sing.". In the original Japanese titles, all the songs come with a parenthesis which includes the collaborator name plus the adverb yori (より), which in English translates into "from xx".

== Promotion ==
The album was preceded by the digital singles "Vanity" and "Freeky". "Vanity" was used as theme song for the TV drama series Yu Yu Wonderland which premiered July 2023 on TV Osaka and BS TV Tokyo. "Freeky" was featured on a Web commercial for medicated lip balms by DHC. The song "Minor na Kiss" also had an early release, becoming available on streaming platforms on September 4, 2023.

== Track listing ==
Marble - CD, digital release
No.	Title	Writer(s)	Length
1.	"Minor na Kiss" (マイナーなキス)	Enon Kawatani	3:05
2.	"Vanity"	Aio; Shinichi Osawa	3:22
3.	"Magenta" (マゼンタ)	Mito	3:03
4.	"Goodbye Soba" (グッバイ蕎麦)	Aio; Masato Nakamura	4:20
5.	"Freeky"	Aio; Koichi Tsutaya	4:55
6.	"Tokyo Spiral" (東京スパイラル)	Aio; Yoshiki Mizuno	4:50
7.	"I Was A Girl"	Haruko Nagaya	4:21
Total length:			26:50

== Charts ==
Weekly chart performance for Marble
Chart (2023)	Peak position
Japanese Albums (Oricon)	81
Japanese Top Albums Sales (Billboard Japan)	69
