= Love Punch =

Studio album by Ai Otsuka
- Released: March 31, 2004
- Recorded: 2003–2004
- Genre: J-pop
- Length: 46:00
- Label: Avex Trax
- Producer: Ai Otsuka

Ai Otsuka chronology
Love Punch (2004)	Love Jam (2004)

Alternative cover
- CD+DVD Cover

Singles from Love Punch
- 1. "Momo no hanabira" Released: 10 September 2003; 2. "Sakuranbo" Released: 17 December 2003; 3. "Amaenbo" Released: 3 March 2004

Love Punch is the debut studio album by Japanese singer-songwriter Ai Otsuka, released on March 31, 2004, through Avex Trax.

== Background and release ==
Otsuka debuted in 2003 with the single "Momo no Hanabira," but gained widespread recognition with her second single, "Sakuranbo," which became a cultural phenomenon in Japan. Following the success of "Amaenbo" in March 2004, Otsuka released Love Punch to capitalize on her rising popularity. The album was recorded between January and February 2004, with arrangements prepared in December 2003. Otsuka collaborated closely with arranger Ikoman, combining her piano melodies with his guitar-driven arrangements to create a cohesive yet varied sound. The album’s songs were written over several years, with the earliest track, "Always Together," composed when Otsuka was seventeen years old, while the latest, "Ame no Naka no Melody," written in June 2003. Otsuka described the album as a labor of love, reflecting her personal experiences and emotions, particularly around themes of love and relationships. Otsuka cited contemporary acts such as Tommy february6 to Rip Slyme as influences on the album.

Love is a central theme on the album, with Otsuka noting that romantic themes were the easiest to write about, as seen in tracks like "Kataomoi Dial" and "Honey." The latter, written before Ohtsuka owned a pet, imagines the affection for a pet rabbit, a sentiment she later confirmed after adopting one. The album’s overarching message, as described by Otsuka, is to inspire kindness and emotional warmth in listeners. The song "Ishikawa Osaka Yukojo Yaku" features a lively group atmosphere with contributions from staff members, including Otsuka’s mother and production director, credited as “Okasan” and “Tokuchan.”

This album was released in two formats: a CD Only version and a CD+DVD version. The CD+DVD edition comes with a DVD containing promo clips and interviews. A distinctive feature of initial pressings of Love Punch is the inclusion of a picture book illustrated by Otsuka, inspired by a suggestion from her arranger. The picture book complements the album’s whimsical and heartfelt tone, adding a visual dimension to her storytelling.

== Chart performance ==
The album peaked at number three on the Oricon charts and stayed on the charts for a total of 98 weeks. Because the album sold 519,300 copies in 2004, it became the twentieth most popular album of 2004. However, it also charted on the 2005 end-of-year charts at #94 as it sold 159,025 copies in that year as well. In total, this album has sold 698,277 units.

== Track listing ==
All tracks are written by Ai, arranged by Ai×Ikoman.

CD
No.	Title	Length
1.	"Pretty Voice"	3:33
2.	"Momo no Hanabira" (桃ノ花ビラ; Peach Flower Petals)	4:55
3.	"Sakuranbo" (さくらんぼ; Cherries)	3:56
4.	"Girly"	4:02
5.	"Ame no Naka no Merodii" (雨の中のメロディー; Melody In The Rain)	5:08
6.	"Shabon dama" (しゃぼん玉; Soap Bubbles)	4:30
7.	"Ishikawa Osaka Yuukou Jouyaku" (石川大阪友好条約; Ishikawa Osaka Friendship Treaty)	3:55
8.	"Kataomoi Daiaru" (片想いダイヤル; A Crush Dialing)	4:22
9.	"Honey" (ハニー)	2:18
10.	"Amaenbo" (甘えんぼ; Spoiled Child)	4:14
11.	"Always Together"	5:03

DVD
No.	Title	Length
1.	"Shabondama" (Music video)
2.	"Special Talk "Yousuke/Ai-chin no [Ai xx Love x Punch]"" (スペシャルトーク"洋介・愛ちんの「愛××LOVE×PUNCH」)
3.	"Kataomoi Dial" (Ending Edition)
