= Bye Bye (Ai Otsuka song) =

"バイバイ" "Baibai" / "Bye Bye"

Single by Ai Otsuka

from the album Love Letter
- Released: February 25, 2009
- Recorded: 2009
- Genre: J-Pop
- Label: Avex Trax
- Songwriter(s): Ai Otsuka

Ai Otsuka singles chronology
"Kurage, Nagareboshi" (2008)	"バイバイ" "Baibai" / "Bye Bye" (2009)	"Zokkondition/Lucky Star" (2010)

Love singles chronology
"Love no Theme" (2007)	"White Choco" (2007)

"Bye Bye" (バイバイ) is the 19th single from Japanese singer Ai Otsuka, and the fourth single to be released from her Love Letter album. It is her second re-cut single, and it will be the CM song for the Asahi Breweries LTD new low-alcohol beverage, Asahi Slat.

== Track listing ==
All tracks are written by Ai Otsuka

CD
No.	Title	Arranger(s)	Length
1.	"Bye Bye"	Ai×Ikoman	4:26
2.	"Bye Bye" (Instrumental)	Ai×Ikoman	4:26

DVD
No.	Title	Length
1.	"Bye Bye" (Music video)

== Charts ==
=== Oricon sales charts (Japan) ===
Release	Chart	Peak position	Sales total
February 25, 2009	Oricon Daily Chart	4	20,536
