= Zokkondition / Lucky Star =

"Zokkondition/Lucky Star"

Single by Ai Otsuka

from the album Love Fantastic
- Released: April 7, 2010
- Recorded: 2010
- Genre: J-Pop
- Label: Avex Trax
- Songwriter(s): Ai Otsuka

Ai Otsuka singles chronology
"Bye Bye" (2009)	"Zokkondition/Lucky Star" (2010)	"Action 10.5" (2010)

"Zokkondition/Lucky Star" (ゾッ婚ディション/LUCKY☆STAR) is the twentieth single by Japanese singer Ai Otsuka under the label Avex Trax. It was released on April 7, 2010, more than a year after her last single "Bye Bye".

The title "Zokkondition" is a combination of three words: "zokkon" (ゾッコン), "kekkon" (結婚), and the English word "condition" (コンディション).

The single reached the sixth position on the Oricon weekly singles chart and charted for five weeks. It was released in CD-only and CD+DVD formats.

The song "Zokkondition" was used in two commercials, one for Asahi Breweries and another for Music.jp. The song "Lucky Star" was used in Japan as the theme song by Fuji TV for the 2010 Winter Olympics.

== Track listing ==
All tracks are written by Ai Otsuka.

CD
No.	Title	Arranger(s)	Length
1.	"Zokkondition" (ゾッ婚ディション)	Ai×Ikoman
2.	"Lucky Star"	Ai×Ikoman

DVD
No.	Title	Director	Length
1.	"Zokkondition" (Music Video)	Kaori Haga
2.	"Lucky Star" (Music Video)	Tamdem
