= Re:Name =

Japanese song

Single by Ai Otsuka

from the album Love Fantastic
- Released: October 9, 2013
- Recorded: 2013
- Genre: J-Pop
- Length: 21:50
- Label: Avex Trax
- Songwriter(s): Ai Ootsuka
- Producer(s): AiO

Ai Otsuka singles chronology
"I Love xxx" (2010)	"Re:Name" (2013)	"Sakuranbo -Cocktail-" (2013)

Music video
- "Re:Name" music video on YouTube

Re:Name is a song by Japanese recording artist Ai Otsuka, released as single on October 3, 2013 by Avex Trax.

== Background ==
"Re:Name" is Otsuka's first single to celebrate her tenth anniversary in the music industry. Written by Otsuka herself (under the pen name aio), it was her first solo single in three years, after her hiatus and subsequent begin as vocalist in band Rabbit.

To promote the single, a month before its release, "Re:Name" was used as in NTV's programs Pon! and Music Dragon, as ending and opening themes respectively. The music video of the song was uploaded on September 15, 2013 on Avex Network's YouTube Channel.

== Track listings ==
- Digital download
1. "Re:Name" – 4:53
2. "Hello Me" – 4:10
- CD
1. "Re:Name" – 4:54
2. "Hello Me" – 4:14
3. "Toilet Paper Blues" (トイレットペーパーブルース) – 3:37
4. "Re:Name" (Instrumental) – 4:55
5. "Hello Me" (Instrumental) – 4:08
- DVD
1. "Re:Name" (Music Clip)
2. "Re:Name" (Making)
