= Pocket (Ai Otsuka song) =

"ポケット" "Poketto" / "Pocket""

Single by Ai Otsuka

from the album Love Letter
- B-side: "Ticket (チケット; Chiketto)"
- Released: November 7, 2007
- Recorded: 2007
- Genre: J-Pop
- Label: Avex Trax
- Songwriter(s): Ai Otsuka

Ai Otsuka singles chronology
"Peach / Heart" (2007)	"ポケット" "Poketto" / "Pocket"" (2007)	""Rocket Sneaker / One × Time""

Love singles chronology
"Love no Theme" (2007)	"White Choco" (2007)

"Pocket" is Ai Otsuka's 16th (17th overall) single released under the avex trax label. It is her third (fourth) single to be released in 2007. This is her first single to be released after her fourth album, approximately two months after Love Piece. This is Otsuka's first original single since her debut single "Momo no hanabira", which sold 44,822 copies, to sell less than 100,000 copies.

== Track listing ==
All tracks are written by Ai Otsuka.

CD
No.	Title	Arranger(s)	Length
1.	"Pocket"	Ai×Ikoman, Strings arrangement： Mio Okamura	4:51
2.	"Ticket"	Ai×Ikoman, Strings arrangement： Mio Okamura	4:30
3.	"Life - Love Circle -"	Ai×Ikoman	3:52
4.	"Pocket" (Instrumental)	Ai×Ikoman, Strings arrangement： Mio Okamura	4:51
5.	"Ticket" (Instrumental)	Ai×Ikoman, Strings arrangement： Ittetsu Gen	4:29

DVD
No.	Title	Length
1.	"Pocket" (Music video)

== Charts ==
Oricon sales chart (Japan)

Release	Chart	Peak position	First week sales	Sales total
November 7, 2007	Oricon Daily Chart	4		
November 7, 2007	Oricon Weekly Chart	5	39,236	61,350
