= More More (song) =

- CD+DVD and digital edition cover

Single by Ai Otsuka

from the album Love Fantastic
- Language: Japanese
- Released: May 21, 2014
- Genre: J-pop
- Length: 3:35
- Label: Avex Trax
- Songwriter(s): Aio

Ai Otsuka singles chronology
"Sakuranbo -Cocktail-" (2013)	"More More" (2014)	"Hibi, Ikiteireba" (2016)

Music video
- "More More" on YouTube

"More More" (モアモア, Moa Moa) is a song by Japanese singer-songwriter Ai Otsuka, released as her 24th single on May 21, 2014, through Avex Trax.

== Background and release ==
"More More" was released as the second single in Otsuka's tenth Anniversary project, following her major debut commemoration in 2013. The song was described as a "refreshing and exhilarating pop tune," with lyrics that repeatedly emphasize desires prefixed by the word "tappuri" (meaning "plenty" or "more"), such as wanting to be loved, embraced, or to travel extensively.

The single was released in two formats: a standard CD-only edition and a CD+DVD edition. The single’s cover artwork features Otsuka posing alongside 47 life-sized cutouts of herself, arranged to resemble a large group photo reminiscent of a Japanese idol group. When the two versions of the artwork (for the CD and CD+DVD editions) are placed side by side, they form a complete image of Otsuka surrounded by her cutouts. The DVD includes the music video for "More More" and behind-the-scenes making-of footage, along with credits for participants from various regions of Japan involved in the video's production.

== Music video ==
The music video for "More More" features the forty-seven life-sized cardboard cutouts of Otsuka placed at iconic landmarks across all forty-seven prefectures of Japan. The concept was driven by Otsuka’s desire to "create a single work with people across the nation" and to "involve as many people as possible." The video showcases these cutouts interacting with locals, tourists, and even animals at various tourist attractions. The production of the music video was extensive, involving over 250 people and more than 200 hours of filming. The cutouts were manufactured at a paper factory, shipped to each prefecture, and photographed in multiple poses, with the entire process from conception to completion taking approximately four months.

Otsuka herself described the project as a way to "greet" people across Japan, stating the following: "In the 10 years since my debut, I’ve traveled across Japan for shootings, events, and live tours, and it’s been so much fun. But I realized there are still so many places I haven’t been to. My actions have been small, and I want to go more places and see more of Japan. So, as a greeting, I sent my panels out first. They really went there, really met the local people. The surreal and emotional experience, along with the beauty of Japan, only makes me want to visit more."

== Track listing ==
All tracks are written by Aio.

More More - CD, digital release
No.	Title	Length
1.	"More More" (モアモア)	3:34
2.	"Fu Fu Fu" (フフフ)	4:08
3.	"More More" (Instrumental)	3:35
4.	"Fu Fu Fu" (Instrumental)	4:08
Total length:		15:25

More More - DVD
No.	Title	Length
1.	"More More" (Music Clip)
2.	"More More" (Making)
