= Su (Rip Slyme) =

Japanese singer (born 1973)

SU
- 大槻 一人 (Ōtsuki Kazuto)
- Born: Kazuto Otsuki; 20 November 1973 (age 51); Fujisawa, Kanagawa, Japan
- Occupation: Hip hop MC
- Spouse: Ai Otsuka (m. 2010; div. 2018)
- Children: 1
- Musical career
- Genres: Hip hop
- Years active: 1994-present

Su (stylized as SU; born 20 November 1973, in Tsujidō, Fujisawa, Kanagawa) is an MC for the hip hop unit Rip Slyme. His real name is Kazuto Otsuki (大槻 一人, Ōtsuki Kazuto).

Su is also a member of Funky Grammar Unit. His former wife is singer-songwriter Ai Otsuka. He has one daughter, born on 24 March 2011.

== Discography ==
=== Internet songs ===
Year	Title
2010	"Parco, Ala?! No uta"
2010	"Deep Cleansing"

=== Guest appearances ===
Artist	Song
DJ Fumuya feat. Su, Ca2o (Mellow Down)	"Ore wa Omae janai"
Ozrosaurus	"Mochi mu"
Ayumi Hamasaki	"Two of us "rub’delight mix""
Gaku-MC	"Hatarakou"
Betchin'	"Happiness –I don't touch your old love– (Track Production Remix Feat. Su from Rip Slyme)"
Gaku-MC	"The Deep Inner Groove"
Betchin'	"You’re My Heaven featuring Su from Rip Slyme"
Penpals	"More Fun? (Customized For FTR)"
breakthrough	"A Song feat. Pes & Su from Rip Slyme"
Fantastic Plastic Machine	"dance dance dance dance feat. Su (Rip Slyme)"
Rhymester	"Weekend Shuffle feat. MCU, Ryo-Z, Kreva, CueZero, Channel, Kohei Japan, Su, Little, Ilmari, Gaku-MC, Sonomi, Pes, K.I.N, Dohzi-T"
Wise	"Hey girl! feat. Su (Rip Slyme)"
Ai Otsuka×Su from Rip Slyme	"aisu×time"
Q;indivi + Su	"a world of difference"
Alpha feat. lecca, Su	"She Sea Girl"
Studio Apartment	"Miss Universe feat. Su, Ilmari (from Rip Slyme), Meisa Kuroki"
lecca	"Hi-Ten feat Ilmari & Su"
jjj	"damn feat. Su (Rip Slyme)"

== Filmography ==
=== TV dramas ===
Year	Title	Role	Network
2012	Legal High	Mania Bocho	Fuji TV

=== Entertainment shows ===
Year	Title	Network
2008	–Jodeki! Pop Company– Pop-ya	Fuji TV
2009	Campus Night Fuji	Fuji TV
2011	Cul Machio! Minna no Shakai Car Kengaku	TBS

=== Films ===
Year	Title	Role	Ref.
2015	Fūfu Huufu Nikki	Publisher editor	

=== Radio ===
Year	Title	Network
2011	Radipedia	J-Wave
