= Neko ni Fūsen =

"ネコに風船" "Neko ni Fūsen" / "A Cat with a Balloon"

Single by Ai Otsuka

from the album Love Cook
- Released: July 13, 2005
- Genre: Pop
- Length: 19:34
- Label: avex trax AVCD-30741 (Japan, CD+DVD); AVCD-30740 (Japan, CD)
- Songwriter(s): Ai Otsuka
- Producer(s): Max Matsuura

Ai Otsuka singles chronology
"Smily / Biidama" (2005)	"ネコに風船" "Neko ni Fūsen" / "A Cat with a Balloon" (2005)	"Planetarium" (2005)

"Neko ni Fūsen" (ネコに風船; A Cat with a Balloon) is Ai Otsuka's 9th single, which was released on 13 July 2005. This single sold 111,324 units and reached #92 on the 2005 Oricon yearly charts.

== Track list ==
All tracks are written by Ai Otsuka.

CD
No.	Title	Arranger(s)	Length
1.	"Neko ni Fūsen (ネコに風船; A Cat with a Balloon)"	Ai×Ikoman	5:13
2.	"Natsuzora (夏空; Summer Sky)"	Ai×Ikoman	4:34
3.	"Neko ni Fūsen (ネコに風船; A Cat with a Balloon)" (Instrumental)	Ai×Ikoman	5:11
4.	"Natsuzora (夏空; Summer Sky)" (Instrumental)	Ai×Ikoman	4:31
Total length:			19:34

DVD
No.	Title	Length
1.	"Neko ni Fūsen (ネコに風船; A Cat with a Balloon)" (Music video)
