= Rabbit (Japanese band) =

- Origin: Japan
- Genres: J-pop, rock
- Years active: 2012–present
- Labels: Cutting Edge
- Members: Ai Otsuka; Toshiyuki Mori; Watusi; Taiji Satou; Takashi Numazawa; Sasuga Minami
- Website: conglorabbit.com

Rabbit is a Japanese band that was formed in 2012. Its line-up consists of Ai Otsuka (vocals, chorus), Toshiyuki Mori (keyboard), Watusi (bass guitar), Taiji Satou (guitar, vocals, and chorus), Takashi Numazawa (drums), and Sasuga Minami (chorus, motion). The band made its debut with their studio album Rabito (裸人, lit. Naked People), which was released on 12 December 2012 and peaked at No. 61 on the Japanese Oricon weekly album chart. The album includes a version of the song "Moonlight", which was originally on Ai Otsuka's mini-album Love It.

== Discography ==
=== Studio album ===
Year	Information	JA peak	Japanese sales
2012	Rabito (裸人, lit. Naked People): Released: 12 December 2012; Label: Cutting Edge	61	
