= Frienger =

"フレンジャー" Furenjā / "Frienger"

Single by Ai Otsuka

from the album Love Piece
- Released: April 12, 2006
- Recorded: 2006
- Genre: J-Pop
- Label: avex trax AVCD-30915/B (Japan, CD+DVD); AVCD-30916 (Japan, CD)
- Songwriter(s): Ai Otsuka

Ai Otsuka singles chronology
| "Planetarium" (2005) | "フレンジャー"; Furenjā / "Frienger" (2006) | "Yumekui" (2006) |

"Frienger" (フレンジャー; Furenjā) is Ai Otsuka's 11th single under the avex trax label and her first of three singles in 2006.

"Frienger" is a catchy, upbeat song. The title is actually a portmanteau of the words "Friend" and "Ranger". The song was used in the CM for au mobile service and was the theme song for the television program "Sports Uruguzu". The B-side track, "Amai Kimochi Maru Kajiri", was used in a Music.jp CM. The music video for the song was filmed in Taiwan.

"Frienger" debuted at #2 on the Oricon Weekly Singles Chart with 70,414 copies sold. It maintained high sales for the following two weeks and sold a total of 173,115 copies in 2006. "Frienger" was Otsuka's best-selling single of 2006 and the 60th best-selling single of 2006 overall. It is currently her fourth best-selling single.

== Track listing ==
All tracks are written by Ai Otsuka

CD
| No. | Title | Arranger(s) | Length |
|---|---|---|---|
| 1. | "Frienger (フレンジャー)" | Ai×Ikoman | 3:48 |
| 2. | "Amai Kimochi Maru Kajiri (甘い気持ちまるかじり; A Bite Full of Sweet Feelings)" | Ai×Ikoman | 4:17 |
| 3. | "Frienger (フレンジャー)" (Instrumental) | Ai×Ikoman | 3:48 |
| 4. | "Amai Kimochi Maru Kajiri (甘い気持ちまるかじり; A Bite Full of Sweet Feelings)" (Instrumental) | Ai×Ikoman | 4:14 |
| Total length: | | | 16: 07 |

DVD
| No. | Title | Length |
|---|---|---|
| 1. | "Frienger (フレンジャー)" (Music video) |

== Live performances ==
- 3 April 2006 – Hey! Hey! Hey! Special
- 15 April 2006 – Music Fighter
- 21 April 2006 – Music Station
- 22 April 2006 – CDTV
- 1 May 2006 – PopJam DX
- 29 December 2006 – Sakigake Ongaku Banzuke - "Frienger" + "Ren'ai Shashin"
- 1 January 2007– CDTV - "Frienger" + "Ren'ai Shashin"

== Charts ==
Oricon Sales Chart (Japan)

| Release | Chart | Peak position | First week sales | Sales total |
|---|---|---|---|---|
| April 12, 2006 | Oricon Daily Charts | 2 | | |
| April 12, 2006 | Oricon Weekly Charts | 2 | 70,414 | 173,115 |
| April 12, 2006 | Oricon Yearly Charts | 60 | | |
