= Kuroge Wagyu Joshio Tanyaki 680-en =

Single by Ai Otsuka

from the album Ai am Best
- Released: February 9, 2005
- Genre: Pop
- Length: 19:23
- Label: Avex Trax
- Songwriter(s): Ai
- Producer(s): Max Matsuura

Ai Otsuka singles chronology
"Daisuki da yo." (2004)	"Kuroge Wagyu Joshio Tanyaki 680-en" (2005)	"Smily / Biidama" (2005)

"Kuroge Wagyu Joshio Tanyaki 680-en" (黒毛和牛上塩タン焼680円, Kuroge Wagyū Jōshio Tanyaki Roppyaku Hachijū-en) is Ai Otsuka's seventh single. It was released on 9 February 2005, by Avex Trax. The title is roughly translated as "680 yen salty grilled black Japanese beef tongue."

The song was used as ending theme for TV Tokyo's 2005 anime series Black Jack. This single sold 149,134 copies and it became the #68 best selling single of 2005. The b-sides included on the maxi single are all related to meat types with its respective prices.

== Background ==
"Kuroge Wagyuu" is a rock version of "Kuroge Wagyu... 735 En" on her Love Jam album. It features a part of the chorus at the beginning a cappella before going into rock instrumentals. "Hon Maguro" is a jazz track, featuring heartbeats and a jazz band. "Tsukune" is a hard post-grunge song that has Ai's vocals masked after the intro. The intro is a simple 30-second piano ballad before going right into the song. This song sparked some discussion into what she could be actually saying, because the beginning's lyrics was open to discussion for sexually suggestive lyrics. This arguably is Ai's most daring single, seeing as all of the song's lyrics were sexually suggestive, or sexual innuendos as in "Tsukune".

== Music video ==
The music video for "Kuroge" was also sexually suggestive, as it featured Ai in a black dress in a restaurant trying to seduce a man (portrayed by Kou Takasugi) by feeding him. It features her in a restaurant with the man, her barefoot sitting in a room full of sparkling objects and then her in a bright blue fuzzy shag room. It goes between those scenes in that order until at the end, when Ai gets the man to come into her bright blue room, only for him to eat her food and fall through a strange hole.

== Track listing ==
All tracks are written by Ai Otsuka

CD
No.	Title	Arranger(s)	Length
1.	"Kuroge Wagyu Joshio Tanyaki 680-en" (黒毛和牛上塩タン焼680円)	Ai×Ikoman	3:53
2.	"Honmaguro Chūtoro 300-en (Midori-iro)" (本マグロ中トロ三00円 (緑色); Semi-fatty Tuna 300 Yen (Green))	Ai×Ikoman	4:19
3.	"Tsukune 70-en" (つくね70円; Fish Meatloaf 70 Yen)	Ai×Ikoman	3:01
4.	"Kuroge Wagyu Joshio Tanyaki 680-en" (Instrumental)	Ai×Ikoman	3:47
5.	"Honmaguro Chūtoro 300-en (Midoriiro)" (Instrumental)	Ai×Ikoman	4:18
Total length:			19:18

DVD
No.	Title	Length
1.	"Kuroge Wagyu Joshio Tanyaki 680-en" (Music video)
