= Happy Days (Ai Otsuka song) =

Single by Ai Otsuka

from the album Love Jam
- Released: July 7, 2004
- Genre: J-pop, pop rock, pop punk
- Label: avex trax AVCD-30601/B (Japanese, CD+DVD); AVCD-CD-30602 (Japan, CD)
- Songwriter: Ai Otsuka
- Composer: Ai×Ikoman

Ai Otsuka singles chronology
"Amaenbo" (2004)	"Happy Days" (2004)	"Kingyo Hanabi" (2004)

Alternative cover
- CD+DVD Cover

"Happy Days" is Ai Otsuka's fourth single. The title track was used as background music in the Morinaga ICE BOX CM, which starred Otsuka, and as the theme of Koukousei Quiz 2004 on Nihon TV. It also contained a new b-side song "Hoshikuzu" (星くず) and instrumental versions of both songs. It charted at Number three on the Oricon charts.

== Track list ==
All tracks are written by Ai Otsuka.

CD
No.	Title	Arranger(s)	Length
1.	"Happy Days"	Ai×Ikoman	3:46
2.	"Hoshikuzu (星くず; Stardust)"	Ai×Ikoman	3:48
3.	"Happy Days" (Instrumental)	Ai×Ikoman	3:46
4.	"Hoshikuzu (星くず; Stardust)" (Instrumental)	Ai×Ikoman	3:48
Total length:			15:08

DVD
No.	Title	Length
1.	"Happy Days" (Music video)

== Sales ==
Total estimate: 163,433
