= Love Jam =

Studio album by Ai Otsuka
- Released: 16 November 2004
- Recorded: 2004
- Genre: J-pop
- Length: 44:41
- Label: Avex Trax; AVCD-17537 (Japan, CD+DVD); AVCD-17538 (Japan, CD)
- Producer: Ai Otsuka

Ai Otsuka chronology
Love Punch (2004)	Love Jam (2004)	Love Cook (2005)

Alternative cover
- CD+DVD Cover

Singles from Love Jam
- 1. "Happy Days" Released: 7 July 2004; 2. "Kingyo Hanabi" Released: 18 August 2004; 3. "Daisuki da yo." Released: 20 October 2004; 4. "Kuroge Wagyu Joshio Tan Yaki 680 Yen" Released: 9 February 2005

Love Jam is the second album by Ai Otsuka, released on 17 November 2004 under the Avex Trax record label. This album was available in CD and CD+DVD editions. The first-press of the CD Only edition came with an 80-page illustration book drawn by Ai Otsuka herself (limited to 200,000 copies). The album hit #30 in 2005, selling 414,513 copies. In total, the album has sold about 656,708 copies.

The CD+DVD edition (with a different cover) came with a DVD containing the animated version of Daisuki da yo's PV, which featured Otsuka's LOVE characters. The DVD also included a short film starring Otsuka involving the Kingyo Hanabi track.

== Track listing ==
All tracks are written by Otsuka, credited as "Ai".

CD
No.	Title	Arranger(s)	Length
1.	"Superman" (スーパーマン)	Ai×Ikoman
2.	"Happy Days"	Ai×Ikoman
3.	"Strawberry Jam"	Ai×Ikoman
4.	"Daisuki Da yo." (大好きだよ。; I Love You.)	Ai×Ikoman; Strings arrangements: Ittetsu Gen
5.	"Sensu" (扇子; Fan)	Ai×Ikoman
6.	"Mousou Choppu" (妄想チョップ; Crazy Chop)	Ai×Ikoman
7.	"Pompon" (ポンポン)	Ai×Ikoman, Akinori Suzuki
8.	"Futatsuboshi Kinenbi" (ふたつ星記念日; Two Stars Remembrance Day)	Ai×Ikoman
9.	"Kingyo Hanabi" (金魚花火; Goldfish Fireworks)	Ai×Ikoman
10.	"Kuroge Wagyuu Joushio Tan Yaki 735 Yen" (黒毛和牛上塩タン焼735円; Salty Grilled Tongue of Black Cow 735 Yen)	Ai×Ikoman
11.	"Friends" (フレンズ)	Ai×Ikoman; Strings arrangements: Ittetsu Gen

DVD
No.	Title	Length
1.	"Love's Story ~Daisuki Da yo.~" (Short Film)
2.	"Short Film ~Kingyo Hanabi~" (Short Film)

== Charts and certifications ==
=== Charts ===
Chart	Peak position	Sales total
Oricon Weekly Chart	1	224,381
Oricon Yearly Chart	30	414,513

=== Certifications ===
Country	Provider	Certification
Japan	RIAJ	Double Platinum

- Total Sales: 656,708 (Japan)
