= Rocket Sneaker / One × Time =

"ロケットスニーカー / One × Time Rocket Sneaker / One × Time"

Single by Ai Otsuka

from the album Love Letter
- B-side: "Sora to Kujira (空とくじら)"
- Released: May 21, 2008
- Recorded: 2008
- Genre: J-Pop
- Length: 21:17
- Label: Avex Trax
- Songwriter: Ai Otsuka

Ai Otsuka singles chronology
"Pocket" (2007)	"ロケットスニーカー / One × Time; Rocket Sneaker / One × Time" (2008)	"Kurage, Nagareboshi" (2008)

Alternative cover
- CD cover

"Rocket Sneaker / One × Time" is Ai Otsuka's 17th (18th overall) single released under the avex trax label. It is her first single released in 2008, on May 21.

"Rocket Sneaker / One × Time" has been certified Gold by RIAJ for shipment of 100,000 copies . However, it is her lowest selling single.

== Track listing ==
All tracks are written by Ai Otsuka.

CD
No.	Title	Arranger(s)	Length
1.	"Roketto Sunīkā (ロケット スニーカー; Rocket Sneaker)"	Ai×Ikoman
2.	"One × Time"	Ai×Ikoman, Strings arrangement： Ittetsu Gen
3.	"Sora to Kujira (空とくじら; Sky and Whale)"	Ai×Ikoman
4.	"Roketto Sunīkā (ロケット スニーカー; Rocket Sneaker)" (Instrumental)	Ai×Ikoman
5.	"One × Time" (Instrumental)	Ai×Ikoman, Strings arrangement： Ittetsu Gen

DVD
No.	Title	Length
1.	"Roketto Sunīkā (ロケット スニーカー; Rocket Sneaker)" (Music video)

Rocket Sneaker is a piano-driven tune, reminiscent of rag-time music. It describes saying "thank you" to the Earth before going off it, but remembering that one is always "chikyuukko (地球っ子 (Earth child))". One × Time is a more mature love song, describing feelings of true love. It is lyrically confusing, but Ai revealed that it is from the viewpoint of a clock. Sora to Kujira is more of rock/pop song describing a whale that returns to the sky to join its mama (papa in the second chorus).

=== Music video ===
The Rocket Sneaker PV features Ai in stop-motion frames as the camera goes around a path of frozen figures of her doing everyday things. During the chorus, many of her begin to sing in unison. At the end of it, the very last Ai starts to move around, revealing that the path is a loop, and then she starts to go around the path, as the other Ai's have vanished.

Despite its status as an A-side song, One × Time doesn't have a video.

== Charts ==
=== Oricon sales charts (Japan) ===
Release	Chart	Peak position	First week sales	Sales total
May 21, 2008	Oricon Daily Chart	2		
May 21, 2008	Oricon Weekly Chart	4	30,382	44,428
