= Planetarium (Ai Otsuka song) =

Single by Ai Otsuka

from the album Love Cook
- Released: September 21, 2005
- Recorded: 2005
- Genre: Pop
- Label: avex trax AVCD-30768/B (Japan, CD+DVD); AVCD-30769 (Japan, CD)

Ai Otsuka singles chronology
"Neko ni Fūsen" (2005)	"Planetarium" (2005)	"Frienger" (2006)

Music video
- "Planetarium" on YouTube

"Planetarium" (プラネタリウム, Puranetariumu) is Ai Otsuka's tenth single, which was released on 21 September 2005. The single had great success and became Otsuka's second #1 hit on the Oricon charts, selling 316,425 copies. In 2005, Planetarium sold 215,114 copies, making it the #41 best-selling single of the year. However, it still charted into the next year and was the #99 best-selling single in 2006, selling 100,555 copies. Planetarium is her second best-selling single after "Sakuranbo."

"Planetarium" was featured on Ai Otsuka's studio-album Love Cook. It was also used as an OST for the Japanese drama Hana Yori Dango.

== Track listing ==
All tracks are written by Ai Otsuka.

CD
No.	Title	Arranger(s)	Length
1.	"Planetarium"	Ai×Ikoman	5:10
2.	"Drop."	Ai×Ikoman	4:28
3.	"Planetarium" (Instrumental)	Ai×Ikoman	5:08
4.	"Drop." (Instrumental)	Ai×Ikoman	4:25
Total length:			19:11

DVD
No.	Title	Length
1.	"Planetarium" (Music video)

== Certifications ==
Certifications for "Planetarium"
Region	Certification	Certified units/sales
Streaming
Japan (RIAJ)	Gold	50,000,000^{†}
^{†} Streaming-only figures based on certification alone.
