= Love Letter (Ai Otsuka album) =

Studio album by Ai Otsuka
- Released: December 17, 2008
- Recorded: 2007–2008
- Genre: J-pop
- Length: 56:14
- Label: Avex Trax; AVCD-23693 (Japan, CD+DVD); AVCD-23694 (Japan, CD)
- Producer: Ai Otsuka

Ai Otsuka chronology
Love Piece (2007)	"Love Letter" (2008)	Love is Best (2009)

Alternative cover
- CD+DVD Cover

Singles from Love Letter
- 1. "Pocket" Released: 7 November 2007; 2. "Rocket Sneaker / One × Time" Released: 21 May 2008; 3. "Kurage, Nagareboshi" Released: 21 September 2008; 4. "Bye Bye" Released: 25 February 2009

Love Letter (stylised as LOVE LETTER) is the fifth studio album released by Ai Otsuka on 17 December 2008. It come in a CD-only format and CD + DVD format. Thirteen songs are included; four from her singles Pocket, Rocket Sneaker / One × Time (both songs as it is a double A-side single) and Kurage, Nagareboshi.

On 16 November 2008, the full album - minus Ningyou - leaked onto the internet. On November 24, mu-mo gave a possibly confirmed track order, later confirmed on the Avex Trax website.

On December 18, one day after the album's release, it was stated that the song "Bye Bye" would be the 4th single off the album, giving Otsuka her 2nd recut single and 19th single overall as Ai Otsuka (21st overall including her singles as LOVE).

The album is certified Gold for shipment of 100,000 copies .

== Track listing ==
All tracks are written by Ai.

No.	Title	Arranger(s)	Length
1.	"Love Letter"
2.	"Rocket Sneaker" (ロケットスニーカー)	Ai×Ikoman
3.	"Bye Bye" (バイバイ)	Ai×Ikoman
4.	"Kurage, Nagareboshi" (クラゲ、流れ星; Jellyfish, Shooting Star)	Ai×Ikoman; String arrangements: Ittetsu Gen
5.	"Ningyou" (人形; Doll)	Ai; String arrangements: Ittetsu Gen
6.	"Kimi Fechi" (君フェチ; You Fetish)	Ai×Ikoman, Atsushi Harada
7.	"Creamy & Spicy"	Ai×Ikoman
8.	"Do☆Positive" (ド☆ポジティブ)	Kotaro Kubo
9.	"360°"	Ai×Ikoman
10.	"Shachihata" (シャチハタ; self-inking rubber stamp)	Masanori Sasaji
11.	"One × Time"	Ai×Ikoman; String arrangements: Ittetsu Gen
12.	"Pocket" (ポケット)	Ai×Ikoman; String arrangements: Mio Okamura
13.	"Ai" (愛; Love)	Ai×Ikoman; String arrangements: Mio Okamura

DVD
No.	Title	Length
1.	"Rocket Sneaker" (Music video)
2.	"Kurage, Nagareboshi" (Music video)
3.	"Do☆Positive" (Music video)
4.	"360°" (Music video)
5.	"Pocket" (Music video)
6.	"Ai" (Music video)

first press version includes
No.	Title	Length
7.	"Ai ~a cappella version~" (Bonus movie)

== Music videos ==
The three music videos promotion Love Letter.

The music videos for 360°, Do☆Positive, and Ai have all debuted on 1 December, 4 December, and 5 December 2008 respectively—and subsequently, all three have appeared on the internet.

The music video for "360°" features Otsuka in a large costume with ornaments of butterflies and piano keys, while switching back between scenes of a player piano, her, and a Merry-Go-Round which is repeatedly mentioned in the lyrics. The video is very abstract, a similar concept she used for her video "Rocket Sneaker".

The video for "Do☆Positive" displays Otsuka is a large afro-wig, accompanied by a band, singing in a seemingly basement-garage type setting. This PV was directed by スミス.

The video for "Ai" is the most plot-oriented out of the debuting three music videos. The video takes place mostly in a park in a large Japanese countryside-setting, and features Otsuka singing to a large, growing crowd. Out of all three, this PV is the most traditional Otsuka-style for videos. The video also features clips of couples, and children. A few interesting clips include Otsuka when she was younger, and of her parents' marriage and mother's pregnancy.

There is also a video for Bye Bye which was released with the single.

== Oricon sales charts (Japan) ==
Release	Chart	Peak position	First week sales	Sales total
December 17, 2008	Oricon Daily Chart	1		
December 17, 2008	Oricon Weekly Chart	3	104,232	179,670
December 17, 2008	Oricon Monthly Chart	7		
December 17, 2008	Oricon Yearly Chart	44		179,670
