= Love Cook =

Studio album by Ai Otsuka
- Released: December 14, 2005
- Recorded: 2005
- Genre: J-pop
- Length: 51:13
- Label: Avex Trax; AVCD-17839 (Japan, CD+DVD); AVCD-17840 (Japan, CD+DVD + Photobook); AVCD-17541 (Japan, CD); AVCD-17542 (Japan, CD + Photobook)
- Producer: Ai Otsuka

Ai Otsuka chronology
Love Jam (2004)	Love Cook (2005)	Ai am Best (2007)

Alternative cover
- CD+Picture Book

Alternative cover
- CD+Photo Book

Singles from Love Cook
- 1. "Smily / Biidama" Released: 11 May 2005; 2. "Neko ni Fūsen" Released: 13 July 2005; 3. "Planetarium" Released: 21 September 2005

Love Cook is Ai Otsuka's third album released on 14 December 2005 under the Avex Trax record label. It was released in four formats: CD only, CD+DVD, CD+Photobook and CD+Picture Book. The latter two are limited to 150,000 copies each, and feature different sleeve case covers. The picture book illustrations are hand-drawn by Ai herself.

Three singles were released before the album: double A-Sided "Smily / Biidama", "Neko ni Fūsen" and "Planetarium". "Smily / Biidama" and "Planetarium" were the first two Ai Otsuka singles to reach the #1 spot in Oricon Weekly Singles Chart, and, having sold more than 300,000 copies each, are among her best-selling singles. All three singles are in the Oricon Top 100 Singles for 2005. On the other hand, "Cherish" had already been released as the final track in the various artists album Love for Nana: Only 1 Tribute, a homage to the manga.

Many songs from Love Cook were used for commercial purposes as part of the artist's endorsements. "Smily" and "Biidama" were background songs in two TV commercials of Lion, a personal hygiene products company. "Neko Ni Fuusen" was featured in the Toshiba W31T commercial. "U-Boat" was image song for the 2006 TV advertisement of Meiko Gijuku, a private school. 'Cherish' and 'Planetarium' were used in music.jp TV spots. 'Planetarium' was also an image song of the 2005 TBS live-action dorama Hana Yori Dango.

Love Cook is Ai Otsuka's best-selling album to date and her first album to pass the 800,000 mark, which was accomplished once the promotional "Love [99] Cook Tour" started. On March 9, Love Cook won an award at the Japan Gold Disc Awards for being one of the best albums of 2005. Total sales now stands at 835,333 units and the album has stayed on the Oricon TOP 300 weekly chart for more than 52 weeks.

== Track listing ==
All tracks are written by Ai.

CD
No.	Title	Arranger(s)	Length
1.	"5:09a.m."	Ai×Ikoman	2:52
2.	"Haneari Tamago" (羽ありたまご; Winged Egg)	Ai×Ikoman; Strings arrangement: Ittetsu Gen	4:58
3.	"Biidama" (ビー玉; Marble)	Ai×Ikoman	4:06
4.	"Smily"	Ai×Ikoman	3:33
5.	"U-Boat" (U-ボート)	Ai×Ikoman	4:42
6.	"Neko Ni Fuusen" (ネコに風船; Cat in a Balloon)	Ai×Ikoman; String arrangements: Ittetsu Gen	5:13
7.	"Cherish"	Ai×Ikoman; String arrangements: Crusher Kimura	4:51
8.	"Ramen 3 Pun Kukkingu" (ラーメン3分クッキング; Cooking 3 Minute Ramen)	Ai×Ikoman	3:00
9.	"Tokyo Midnight" (東京ミッドナイト)	Ai×Ikoman; Brass Arrangement: Yokan	4:56
10.	"Planetarium" (プラネタリウム)	Ai×Ikoman	5:10
11.	"Birthday Song"	Ai×Ikoman	3:50
12.	"Love Music"	Ai×Ikoman	4:30

DVD
No.	Title	Length
1.	"Biidama" (Music video)
2.	"Cherish" (Music video)
