= Yumekui =

"ユメクイ" "Yumekui" / "Dream Eater"

Single by Ai Otsuka

from the album Love Piece
- Released: August 2, 2006
- Recorded: 2006
- Genre: J-Pop
- Label: avex trax AVCD-31021/B (Japan, CD+DVD); AVCD-31022 (Japan, CD)
- Songwriter(s): Ai Otsuka

Ai Otsuka singles chronology
"Frienger" (2006)	"ユメクイ" "Yumekui" / "Dream Eater" (2006)	"Renai Shashin" (2006)

"Yumekui" is Ai Otsuka's 12th single under the avex trax label.

"Yumekui" was used as the theme song to the movie "Tokyo Friends the Movie", which Otsuka starred in. The b-side, which is a ballad named "tears", was also used in the movie.

During the first week, the single debuted at #5 with 63,428 copies sold, making it Otsuka's lowest debut sales of the year. Although the single debuted with relatively low sales, it sold a total of 145,281 copies in 2006, making it the 66th best-selling single of the year.

Unlike most of Otsuka's previous singles, "Yumekui" only had one cover whereas usually there are two different ones; one for the CD-only version and one for the CD+DVD version.

== Track listing ==
All tracks are written by Ai Otsuka

CD
No.	Title	Arranger(s)	Length
1.	"Yumekui (ユメクイ; Dream Eater)"	Ai×Ikoman	5:18
2.	"Tears"	Ai×Ikoman, Strings arrangement： Mio Okamura& Ikoman	4:19
3.	"Yumekui (ユメクイ; Dream Eater)" (Instrumental)	Ai×Ikoman	5:18
4.	"Tears" (Instrumental)	Ai×Ikoman, Strings arrangement： Mio Okamura& Ikoman	4:16
Total length:			19:11

DVD
No.	Title	Length
1.	"Yumekui (ユメクイ; Dream Eater)" (Music video)

== Live performances ==
- 31 July 2006 – Hey! Hey! Hey!
- 4 August 2006 – Music Station
- 4 August 2006 – Music Fighter
- 5 August 2006 – PopJam DX
- 13 August 2006 – CDTV

== Charts ==
Oricon sales chart (Japan)

Release	Chart	Peak position	First week sales	Sales total
August 2, 2006	Oricon Daily Chart	3		
August 2, 2006	Oricon Weekly Chart	5	63,428	146,665
August 2, 2006	Oricon Monthly Chart	7		
August 2, 2006	Oricon Yearly Chart	66		
