= Daisuki da yo =

"大好きだよ。" "Daisuki da yo." / "I love you."

Single by Ai Otsuka

from the album Love Jam
- Released: October 20, 2004
- Genre: Pop
- Length: 18:45
- Label: avex trax AVCD-30627/B (Japan, CD+DVD); AVCD-CD-30628 (Japan, CD)
- Songwriter: Ai Otsuka
- Producer: Max Matsuura

Ai Otsuka singles chronology
"Kingyo Hanabi" (2004)	"大好きだよ。" "Daisuki da yo." / "I love you." (2004)	"Kuroge Wagyu Joshio Tan Yaki 680 Yen" (2005)

Alternative cover
- The CD + DVD Cover

"Daisuki da yo." (大好きだよ。, I love you.) is Ai Otsuka's sixth single, which was released on October 20, 2004, under the avex trax label. It peaked at number three on the Oricon chart in Japan.

"Daisuki da yo." is available as a CD or CD+DVD combination. First pressings of the CD only combination included a limited edition picture book illustrated by Otsuka while the CD+DVD combination included a DVD containing the Daisuki da yo PV. Daisuki da yo. has sold 156,844 units in total.

The song also appears on Otsuka's Love Jam album and was used as the theme song for the drama Tokio Chichi e no Dengon.

== Track list ==
All tracks are written by Ai Otsuka.

CD
No.	Title	Arranger(s)	Length
1.	"Daisuki da yo. (大好きだよ。; I love you.)"	Ai×Ikoman	4:44
2.	"Friends ( Sabakan Ver.)"	Ai×Ikoman	4:39
3.	"Daisuki da yo. (大好きだよ。; I love you.)" (Instrumental)	Ai×Ikoman	4:44
4.	"Friends ( Sabakan Ver.)" (Instrumental)	Ai×Ikoman	4:37
Total length:			18:45

DVD
No.	Title	Length
1.	"Daisuki da yo. (大好きだよ。; I love you.)" (Music video)

== Music video ==
The music video features some captions at the beginning describing Ai's love for a man she misses. After this introduction, there is Ai talking into a camera as her 'boyfriend' joins her for her birthday. It is filmed as an 8-minute mini-drama. The storyline features a happier Ai through videos and pictures taken, a crying Ai holding her dead boyfriend's hand at a morgue/hospital, and then a melancholy Ai against a dark background. The video ends with a flashback of Ai and her boyfriend at night walking the streets.

An animated version of Daisuki da yo features Ai's bunny characters, LOVE and LOVE's male counterpart. It shows scenes of a melancholy LOVE in a pink room reminiscing the times dancing and going motorcycle riding with her lover.
