= Kingyo Hanabi =

"金魚花火" "Kingyo Hanabi" / "Goldfish Fireworks"

Single by Ai Otsuka

from the album Love Jam
- Released: August 18, 2004
- Genre: Pop
- Length: 19:05
- Label: avex trax AVCD-30612/B (Japan, CD+DVD); AVCD-30613 (Japan, CD)
- Songwriter(s): Ai Otsuka
- Producer(s): Max Matsuura

Ai Otsuka singles chronology
"Happy Days" (2004)	"金魚花火" "Kingyo Hanabi" / "Goldfish Fireworks" (2004)	"Daisuki da yo." (2004)

Alternative cover
- The CD and DVD Cover

"Kingyo Hanabi" (金魚花火; Goldfish Fireworks) is Ai Otsuka's fifth single. It was released by avex trax on August 18, 2004. The DVD version was sold simultaneously. It became the theme song of the Japanese television program "Super TV". 50,000 limited edition copies were sold which included a picture book drawn by Otsuka. It reached number three on the Oricon charts.

== Music video ==
'Kingyo Hanabi' is a simple video that shows Otsuka singing underwater and on a small island during dawn/dusk. While Otsuka is on the island, she holds a firework in her hand that emits golden sparks, which then rain down around Otsuka who is under the water. Otsuka sits on a veranda looking at a man and reaches out tentatively, but he moves away before she can hold his hand. She then slowly falls to the ground and cries before disappearing.

== Track listing ==
All tracks are written by Ai Otsuka

CD
No.	Title	Arranger(s)	Length
1.	"Kingyo Hanabi (金魚花火; Goldfish Fireworks)"	Ai×Ikoman	4:36
2.	"Coco Natsu Vacation (ココ夏バケーション; Here Summer Vacation)"	Ai×Ikoman	4:49
3.	"Kingyo Hanabi (金魚花火; Goldfish Fireworks)" (Instrumental)	Ai×Ikoman	4:54
4.	"Coco Natsu Vacation (ココ夏バケーション; Here Summer Vacation)" (Instrumental)	Ai×Ikoman	4:47
Total length:			19:06

DVD
No.	Title	Length
1.	"Kingyo Hanabi (金魚花火; Goldfish Fireworks)" (Music video)
