= Amaenbo =

"甘えん坊" "Amaenbo" / "Spoiled Child"

Single by Ai Otsuka

from the album Love Punch
- Released: March 3, 2004
- Genre: Pop
- Length: 19:47 (CD)
- Label: avex trax AVCD-30574/B (Japan, CD+DVD); AVCD-30575 (Japan, CD)
- Songwriter: Ai Otsuka

Ai Otsuka singles chronology
"Sakuranbo" (2003)	"甘えん坊" "Amaenbo" / "Spoiled Child" (2004)	"Happy Days" (2004)

Alternative cover
- The CD + DVD cover

"Amaenbo" (甘えん坊, Spoiled Child) is Ai Otsuka's third single. The title track was used in a television advertisement for Sato Healthcare's cold relief tablets Stonarhini S (ストナリニS, sutona rini S). The single also contains a new version of "Sakuranbo" (さくらんぼ) ("Cherry") and a new song, "Ame iro parasol" (雨色パラソル, ame iro parasoru) Rain-coloured parasol.

== Track list ==
All tracks are written by Ai Otsuka.

CD
No.	Title	Arranger(s)	Length
1.	"Amaenbo (甘えん坊; Spoiled Child)"	Ai×Ikoman	4:14
2.	"Ame-iro Parasoru (雨色パラソル; Rain Coloured Parasol)"	Ai×Ikoman, Brass instrument arrangement： Takahiro Kaneko	4:14
3.	"Sakuranbo (さくらんぼ; Cherry)" (Studio live ver.)	Ai×Ikoman	2:50
4.	"Amaenbo (甘えん坊; Spoiled Child)" (Instrumental)	Ai×Ikoman	4:14
5.	"Ame-iro Parasoru (雨色パラソル; Rain Coloured Parasol)" (Instrumental)	Ai×Ikoman, Brass instrument arrangement： Takahiro Kaneko	4:15
Total length:			19:47

DVD
No.	Title	Length
1.	"Amaenbo (甘えん坊; Spoiled Child)" (Music video)

== Sales ==
Initial week estimate: 32,591
Total estimate: 105,609
