= Smily/Bīdama =

2005 single by Ai Otsuka

"Smily / ビー玉" "SMILY / Biidama" / "SMILY / Marble"

Single by Ai Otsuka

from the album Love Cook
- Released: May 1, 2005
- Genre: Pop
- Length: 15:18
- Label: avex trax AVCD-30701/B (Japan, CD+DVD); AVCD-30702 (Japan, CD)
- Songwriter: Ai Otsuka
- Producer: Max Matsuura

Ai Otsuka singles chronology
| "Kuroge Wagyu Joshio Tan Yaki 680 Yen" (2005) | "Smily" / "Biidama" (2005) | "Neko ni Fūsen" (2005) |

"Smily / Biidama" (Smily / ビー玉; Smily / Marble) is Ai Otsuka's eighth single, which was released on 11 May 2005. "Smily" was used in a television commercial for Lion's Ban Powder Spray, while "Biidama" is being used in a commercial for Shokubutsu Monogatari Herb Blend shampoo, also by Lion. Otsuka appears in both commercials.

The single debuted at number one on the daily Oricon chart. By the end of its first week, it sold 110,512 copies and was number one on the Oricon weekly chart. The single sold 308,338 copies in 2005 and was the #26 single of that year. The current figures show it has sold 310,323 units in total, making it Otsuka's third highest selling single.

== Track list ==
All tracks are written by Ai Otsuka.

CD
| No. | Title | Arranger(s) | Length |
|---|---|---|---|
| 1. | "Smily" | Ai×Ikoman | 3:33 |
| 2. | "Biidama (ビー玉; Marble)" | Ai×Ikoman | 4:06 |
| 3. | "Smily" (Instrumental) | Ai×Ikoman | 3:33 |
| 4. | "Biidama (ビー玉; Marble)" | Ai×Ikoman | 4:03 |
| Total length: | | | 15:18 |

DVD
| No. | Title | Length |
|---|---|---|
| 1. | "Smily" (Music video) |

== New version ==
"Smily 2"

Single by Ai Otsuka
- Released: July 6, 2022
- Genre: J-pop
- Length: 2:58
- Label: Avex Trax

Ai Otsuka singles chronology
| "Santa ni Kiss wo Shite" (2021) | "Smily 2" (2022) | "Maybe I Love You" (2023) |

Music video
- "Smily 2" on YouTube

In 2022, Otsuka released a new version of the song entitled "Smily 2" (stylized as "SMILY2"), with new vocals and different arrangements. The song was released as a digital single on July 6, 2022.

The song was commissioned by Häagen-Dazs Japan for a web commercial campaign to promote their new limited-edition Mini Cup Creamy Gelato flavors, Pistachio & Milk and Mixed Berry & Cream Cheese, launched on June 28, 2022. The commercial was entitled "Neri Motion," to promote the Häagen-Dazs' "mixing and eating" (neri-tabe) concept, where consumers mix two flavors within a Häagen-Dazs Mini Cup. The web commercial was published on June 27, 2022, and it features Otsuka alongside dancers Bito and Piyote doing a number choreographed by SIS, a Japanese sister dance duo which gained popularity on TikTok. The choreography also incorporates "mixing" movements to reflect the "neri-tabe" concept.

The single's cover artwork features a design by Otsuka herself, depicting a smile drawn on the surface of Häagen-Dazs ice cream, aligning with the song's cheerful theme and the brand's campaign. The song was arranged by musician Shingo Sekiguchi. Otsuka described this new version as "perfect for drives or walks", while Sekiguchi declared: "I hope that we successfully blended the original song's evergreen melody with my take on a modern sound. With the dry beat and crisp guitar cutting in 'Smily 2,' I would be thrilled if listeners can feel [its] summer vibe".

This song was the only new song released by Otsuka in 2022, and to date has not been included on any album.
