= Momo no Hanabira =

Single by Ai Otsuka

from the album Love Punch
- Released: September 10, 2003 CD; October 1, 2003 CD+DVD
- Recorded: 2003
- Genre: Pop
- Length: 18:54 CD
- Label: Avex Trax; AVCD-30525 (Japan, CD); AVCD-30528 (Japan, CD+DVD)
- Songwriter: Ai Otsuka

Ai Otsuka singles chronology
"Momo no Hanabira" (2003)	"Sakuranbo" (2003)

Alternative cover
- The CD and DVD Cover

"Momo no Hanabira" (桃ノ花ビラ, Peach Flower Petals) is the debut single of Japanese singer Ai Otsuka, released on September 10, 2003 in CD-only format, then on October 1, 2003 in CD+DVD format. The title track was used as the theme song of the NTV drama Suika. The two versions charted separately; the CD-only edition peaked 24th on the Oricon weekly singles chart and charted for twenty-one weeks while the CD+DVD edition peaked at the 86th position and charted for seventeen weeks.

== Track listing ==
All tracks are written by Ai Otsuka.

CD
No.	Title	Arranger(s)	Length
1.	"Momo no Hanabira (桃ノ花ビラ; Peach Flower Petals)"	Ai×Ikoman	4:55
2.	"Himawari (向日葵; Sunflower)"	Ai×Ikoman	4:32
3.	"Momo no Hanabira (桃ノ花ビラ; Peach Flower Petals)" (Instrumental)	Ai×Ikoman	4:55
4.	"Himawari (向日葵; Sunflower)" (Instrumental)	Ai×Ikoman	4:31
Total length:			18:54

DVD
No.	Title	Length
1.	"Momo no Hanabira (桃ノ花ビラ; Peach Flower Petals)" (Music video)
2.	"Momo no Hanabira (桃ノ花ビラ; Peach Flower Petals)" (Making of Clip)

== Sales ==
- Initial week (est.): 6,848 (CD); 760 (CD+DVD)
- Total (est.): 31,091 (CD); 13,731 (CD+DVD); 44,822 (all)
