= Sakuranbo =

2003 single by Ai Otsuka

Single by Ai Otsuka

from the album Love Punch
- Released: December 17, 2003
- Recorded: 2003
- Genre: J-pop
- Length: 21:57
- Label: Avex Trax
- Songwriter(s): Ai Otsuka

Ai Otsuka singles chronology
"Momo no Hanabira" (2003)	"Sakuranbo" (2003)	"Amaenbo" (2004)

"Sakuranbo" (さくらんぼ; Cherry) is Ai Otsuka's second single, which was released on December 17, 2003. It is often considered as Otsuka's breakthrough single and was used in 2004 as an ending theme song on the TV show, "Mecha Mecha iketerū! (めちゃ2イケてるッ!)," which Fuji TV produces.

An excerpt of the song is used as the departure melody at Sakuranomiya station on the JR West Osaka Loop Line.

== Music video ==
The video for "Sakuranbo" begins by showing Ai in "her" bedroom which is predominantly red and white. A picture hanging on the wall shows a picture of a pair of cherries. Then we see Ai playing with her band in another room, which starts out blue but changes colour later in the song. We see Ai talking on the phone and drawing Love-Chan. Interspersed throughout the PV are bicycle scenes showing Ai with a man her age, two children and an older couple. The video closes on the picture of the two cherries hanging on the wall.

== Track list ==
All tracks are written by Ai Otsuka.

CD
No.	Title	Arranger(s)	Length
1.	"Sakuranbo (さくらんぼ; Cherry)"	Ai×Ikoman, Brass instrument arrangement： Yoichiro Mizue	3:56
2.	"Kaerimichi (帰り道; The Road Home)"	Ai×Ikoman, Mixed by Jin Terada	5:03
3.	"Momo no Hanabira (桃ノ花ビラ; Peach Petals)" (Studio live ver.)	Ai×Ikoman, Mixed by Shuichi Watanabe	3:59
4.	"Sakuranbo (さくらんぼ; Cherry)" (Instrumental)	Ai×Ikoman, Brass instrument arrangement： Yoichiro Mizue	3:56
5.	"Kaerimichi (帰り道; The Road Home)" (Instrumental)	Ai×Ikoman	5:03
Total length:			21:57

== Sales ==
Initial week estimate: 6,730
Total estimate: 525,784

== Self-cover version ==
"Sakuranbo -Cocktail-"

Single by Ai Otsuka

from the album Aio Punch
- Released: December 4, 2013
- Genre: Jazz
- Length: 3:50
- Label: Avex Trax

Ai Otsuka singles chronology
"Re:Name" (2013)	"Sakuranbo -Cocktail-" (2013)	"More More" (2014)

Music video
- "Sakuranbo -Cocktail-" on YouTube

The song was later re-recorded by Otsuka as a self-cover entitled "Sakuranbo -Cocktail-" (さくらんぼーカクテルー, Sakuranbo Kakuteru), to commemorate the song’s tenth anniversary and Otsuka’s appearance on the YouTube music program Toyota Wish presents Hakuroku Uta Gassen on December 7, 2013.

This version was described as a mature, jazz-infused version of the original 2003 track, featuring a sultry, "sexy" arrangement in a sharp contrast to the original J-pop production. The digital cover was also redesigned, inspired by the original single’s artwork. The track was initially released exclusively on the iTunes Store on December 4, 2013, with additional distribution on other platforms starting December 25, 2013. The song was ultimately included as the lead track on Otsuka's EP Aio Punch, released on March 26, 2014.

To mark Otsuka's fifteenth anniversary in 2018, Avex released a "Sakuranbo" 7-inch vinyl record on February 14, 2019, featuring both the original track and "Sakuranbo -Cocktail-". This release was sold exclusively at HMV in Japan.

On July 24, 2024, a performance video of "Sakuranbo -Cocktail-" recorded in one take premiered on the YouTube channel The First Take as its 459th episode. The audio version of the performance was subsequently released on digital platforms on August 28, 2024.
