= Ai Otsuka =

Japanese singer

- 大塚 愛
- Born: September 9, 1982 (age 44); Osaka, Japan
- Other name: AIO
- Occupations: Singer; songwriter; radio personality
- Spouse: Kazuto Otsuki (m. 2010; div. 2018)
- Children: 1
- Musical career
- Genre: pop rock
- Instruments: Vocals; piano
- Years active: 2003–present
- Label: Avex Trax
- Member of: Rabbit
- Website: www.avex.jp/ai/

Ai Otsuka (大塚 愛, Ōtsuka Ai; born September 9, 1982) is a Japanese singer-songwriter from Suminoe-ku, Osaka, Japan. She is a popular artist on the Avex Trax label and is best known for her 2003 hit "Sakuranbo", which stayed in the Top 200 Oricon Weekly Singles Chart for 103 weeks.

A piano player since age four, Otsuka composes and co-produces her own songs, as well as writes her own lyrics. Her music ranges from upbeat pop/rock music to ballads.

Every year, Otsuka also has her own Love is Born tour to mark the anniversary of being in the music industry and her birthday in September. All of the Love is Born concerts take place in Japan, ending in her hometown of Osaka. On Love is Born 5th Anniversary in 2008, Otsuka held a leg of the concert in Taiwan, where she performed a Chinese version of her song "Planetarium". In 2009, Otsuka held 3 Love is Born 6th Anniversary concerts in Japan, as well as two concerts in Taiwan.

In 2012, Otsuka debuted as the vocalist of the band Rabbit. She sold 7 million copies in Japan.

== Biography ==
=== Early life and career beginnings ===
Otsuka started to play piano at the age of four. She composed her first track at 15, as a homework given by her piano teacher. After graduating from high school she entered to the Osaka University of Arts Nursery College, where she got her degree as a nursery teacher. For a short period of time -around late 2001- she was part of a duo called HimawaRi, along with classmate Mami Nishida. They released only the song "Sakuranbo" on the Internet, and were active for a little time. She sent demo tapes to record labels with no positive results, until she got a call back from Avex just before her graduation from university.

=== 2003: Debut and Love Punch ===
Her debut single, entitled "Momo no Hanabira", was released on September 10, 2003. The single was a minor hit, peaking at number 24 on the Oricon weekly singles top 100, but stayed on the charts for 21 weeks. Her second single, "Sakuranbo", was released on December 17, 2003. The song debuted at number 20 on the Oricon charts, but managed to get into the Top 10 in February 2004 and went to peak at number five. Eventually, the single stayed on the chart for 101 weeks (almost two years), and a special "encore press" version was commissioned, which peaked at number 4, and it became the twelfth best selling single of 2004. Gradually climbing the charts to top 5, the single. In early March 2004, Otsuka released her third single, "Amaenbo". The song peaked at the sixth position on the Japanese charts, while at the same time "Sakuranbo" was fifth. This was the first time in Japanese music history a female artist was able to have two singles in the top ten in the same week. By end of March 2004, her first album, Love Punch, was released, and peaked third on the Oricon charts selling 190,265 copies in its first week.

=== Love Jam ===
In November 2004, the follow-up to Love Punch, Love Jam, was released, which met even greater popular success. Along with three single released before her second studio album was released. First, "Happy Days" sold 163,433 units and reached third on the Oricon weekly chart. Love Jam Tour 2005, her first tour, began on April 24, 2005. It was completed in June 2005 and a live DVD with footage was released on July 27, 2005. Love Cook, her third album was released on December 14, 2005.

"Kingyo Hanabi" was the second single to be released after her first album. "Kingyo Hanabi" also landed in third on the Oricon weekly chart but was able to sell 148,121 units, about 20,000 copies less than her "Happy Days" single. Two months later, Otsuka released another single, "Daisuki da Yo". Like the previous two singles, it reached number 3 on the Oricon weekly chart and sold 156,844 units.

Otsuka released her second studio album a month later in November 2004. Love Jam debuted at the number one position and sold 224,381 units in its first week. In total, 656,700 units were sold. Love Jam became her first album to top the chart, but at the same time it was her lowest selling studio album. Love Jam was released in two different versions including a CD and a CD+DVD version. Following the release of Love Jam, Ai Otsuka released the recut single "Kuroge Wagyu Joshio Tan Yaki 680 Yen" in February 2005. It was a different version of the "Kuroge Wagyu Joshio Tan Yaki 735 Yen" track on Love Jam. "Kuroge Wagyu Joshio Tan Yaki 680 Yen" is arranged differently in terms of music and vocals. This single sold 149,134 units and debuted third on the Oricon weekly chart and was the sixty-eighth single of 2005. It was the first ending theme song for the anime Black Jack.

=== Love Cook ===
"Smily/Biidama" was her first single to be released after Love Jam. Both songs from the single were used for commercials. "Smily/Biidama" sold 110,512 copies during its debut week and charted at first place. "Smily/Biidama" sold a total of 308,338 copies in 2005, placing it as the twenty-sixth single of that year.

It was during this time, in June 2005, that Otsuka made her acting debut with the drama Tokyo Friends. Unlike most dramas, the series was directly released on DVD and never aired on TV. The drama used three songs as its theme song, Boo Bee Benz's "To Me" and "Kimi to Iu Hana," as well the coupling song to her sixth single, "Friends: Sabakan Ver." All three tracks would eventually be included in the soundtrack for the drama's movie sequel.

Otsuka released her tenth single in 2005, "Neko ni Fūsen" in middle of the year in July. "Neko ni Fūsen" was her lowest single that year, only reaching third on the chart and selling 111,324 copies. It placed ninety-second on the 2005 yearly charts.

Otsuka's single "Planetarium", was released on September 20, 2005. This was her last single of that year. "Planetarium" sales of 315,669 was her second highest single second only to "Sakuranbo," before her third studio album was released. "Planetarium" was used as the insert song for the live action version of the drama Hana yori Dango.

Love Cook, her third studio album, came out on December 14, 2005. In its first week, it sold 335,000 copies. The promotional videos for this album were filmed as mini-dramas. She also hosts a radio show on JOQR Recomen!! AM1134hHz called Otsuka Ai no ai-r jack.

=== Love Piece ===
In April 2006, Otsuka released "Frienger" (a portmanteau of the words Friend and Ranger). The promotional video was shot in Taiwan and was used as the commercial song for the Toshiba W41T 4 GB MP3 mobile phone. Soon after the release of "Frienger," Otsuka reprised her role as an actress for Tokyo Friends: The Movie, which hit theaters in Japan on August 12, 2006. The movie is a direct sequel to the DVD drama released the previous year. Otsuka also sang the opening theme for Tokyo Friends, "Yumekui", which was released as a new single on August 2, 2006. It debuted fifth on the weekly chart, selling 63,428 copies in the first week and a total of 145,281 copies.

Two months after "Yumekui", Otsuka released another single titled "Renai Shashin" on October 25, 2006, which was used as the opening theme song for the movie Tada, Kimi o Aishiteru. The song was based on events from the film and its original novel, also called Renai Shashin. "Renai Shashin" debuted at number 2 and sold 129,855 copies, making it the 75th best-selling single of the year. At the end of 2006, Otsuka had released a total of three singles and charted on Oricon's 2006 yearly chart with "Frienger" at number 60, "Yumekui" at number 66, and "Renai Shashin" at number 75.

Otsuka released her fourteenth single, "Chu-Lip," on February 21, 2007. The single was used as the theme song for the TBS drama Kirakira Kenshui, starring Manami Konishi and Wentz Eiji of WaT and managed to claim the third position on the Oricon charts.

=== Ai Am Best ===
Otsuka released her first best hits compilation album, titled Ai am Best, on March 28, 2007, which features 13 pre-2006 songs and their respective promotional videos. There are 11 songs that span her singles in chronological order, one song from Love Cook and one song from a Nana sound track: "Love for Nana: Only 1 Tribute".

Ai am Best sold 64,396 copies on the first day and topped the Oricon charts, making it Otsuka's best selling album. It sold over 350,000 copies in its first week. "Ai am Best" also features two bonus tracks—one for the DVD, "Best of Babashi", and one for the CD, "Babashi". First Press "Ai am Best" includes an Ai stamp and Ai wallet calendar. Some also include an Ai pin in yellow or white.

Otsuka went on a tour titled Ai am Best Tour that featured songs from Ai am Best and more. The tour started on May 18 and ended on July 7, 2007.

=== 2007–2008: Love debut and Love Piece ===
On April 11, 2007, Otsuka released a new single, "Love no Theme," as the self-created bunny rabbit character "Love-chan". "Love no Theme" was sung on her Jam Punch Tour 2005. Before its release, it was titled I canChu before it was changed to "Love no Theme". The "Love no Theme" single included a preview of a new single featuring Love, titled "White Choco." This song could only be found previously on the promotional CD released before "Momo no Hanabira". "Love no Theme" did not sell as well as Otsuka's normal singles.

Otsuka released her first single after Ai am Best, "Peach/Heart" on July 25, 2007. The first A-side "Peach" is an up-beat summer song and was used as the end theme for the summer drama Hanazakari no Kimitachi E (starring Maki Horikita and Shun Oguri), while the second "Heart" is a mid-tempo track. The single also includes a rearranged version of "Renai Shashin", titled "Renai Shashin -Haru-" (恋愛写真 -春-, Love Photograph -Spring-).

On September 26, 2007, Otsuka released two CDs and a DVD. The first CD was Otsuka's fourth original album, titled Love Piece. This included all of her singles from "Frienger" to "Peach/Heart", with five new songs on an 11-track album. The album was released in CD+DVD and CD-only formats, with the DVD including a music video of "Heart" and "Kumuriuta" (クムリウタ), a song from the album. The first-press of the DVD also includes the PV of "U-Boat," while the first-press of the CD-only version comes with a 40-page color photobook. The second CD was a limited pressing re-release of the best album "Ai am Best" in CD-only format.

Also on September 26, Otsuka released a DVD of her Ai am Best Tour 2007, recorded at the Tokyo International Forum Hall A on July 9, 2007. The DVD is available in a single-disc edition, as well as a special two-disc edition with outtakes of the tour. The first-press of the special edition comes with a 40-page photobook.

Otsuka performed at Makuhari Messe on July 7, 2007, for one of Japan's two Live Earth concerts, alongside contemporaries Kumi Koda and Ayaka.

=== 2009–2010: Love Letter and Love is Best ===
Otsuka released her 16th single "Pocket" on November 7, 2007. And two weeks later, Love-chan's second single, "White Choco", was released on November 21, 2007. During 2008, Otsuka embarked on her Love Piece Tour 2008, her fourth solo tour, from February to May. Her 17th single, "Rocket Sneaker/One x Time", was released on May 21. Otsuka's 18th single, "Kurage, Nagareboshi", was released on September 10, 2008. The single was released in four different formats, as a commemoration of her fifth anniversary in the music industry since the release of her debut single "Momo no Hanabira". On December 17, 2008, she released her fifth studio album, Love Letter, which peaked third on the weekly Oricon charts. It contains all of her singles since Love Piece including "Pocket", the third track on the album. Love Letter was her lowest-selling album. On February 25, 2009, "Bye Bye" was released as her second re-cut single. "Bye Bye" was used in a commercial for the Asahi Breweries beverage, Asahi Slat. Otsuka's second compilation album, Love Is Best, was released on November 11, 2009. The album features a collection of "love songs", ranging from singles to album tracks and b-sides, and will feature re-recorded versions of some tracks including a duet with Su from hip-hop band Rip Slyme on the song "Aisu x Time." On its first day of release the album charted at number one with a sales total of 22,895. As her character Love, she also released her first mini album entitled Love It (pronounced Rabitto, as rabbit), on November 18, 2009 (a week after Love Is Best). The album's track "Magic" was used in TV commercials for Music.jp.

In January 2010, Otsuka performed a song for Fuji Television titled "Lucky Star" which the network used as the theme song for its coverage of the 2010 Winter Olympics. In February it was announced that "Lucky Star" would be released as a cellphone-only digital single, but later was announced to have a physical release as a double A-side single, "Zokkondition/Lucky Star", which released on April 7, 2010. "Zokkondition" was used in advertisements for Asahi Beer, similar to her previous single "Bye Bye". On September 8, 2010, she released another single "'I Love..." (I ♥ xxx), which was her 21st and last single before taking a hiatus from music.

=== 2011–present: Hiatus, Rabbit and Love Fantastic ===
During Otsuka's hiatus from music due to her pregnancy, a new song titled "Hikari" was made available for download on October 9, 2011, through her official mobile website Love 9 Cube. On March 30, 2012, she released Neko ga Suki ni natta Kirai na Neko, a series of two picture books about cats. Purchasers of the books had the chance to download another new song, called "Gomen ne". On September 9, 2012, she celebrated her 30th birthday and ninth anniversary in the music industry with Love Is Born: 9th Anniversary 2012, her first series of concerts in two years, in which she held performances in Tokyo, Hyogo and Aichi.

In October 2012, Otsuka announced that she would be debuting as the vocalist of a new band called Rabbit. The band released their debut album Rabito on December 12, 2012, through the Cutting Edge label. The album peaked at number 61 on the Oricon charts. Rabbit went on their first domestic tour in Japan starting in February 2013. This month it was also announced that Otsuka, as a solo, would begin a tour in September to celebrate her tenth anniversary in the music industry. In July 2013, it was announced that Otsuka would be releasing her first solo single in three years, entitled "Re:Name", to celebrate her tenth anniversary. The single was released on October 9, 2013, and debuted at number eight on the Japanese charts. On December 13, 2013, a song entitled "Sakuranbo (Cocktail)", which was a self-cover version of her second single, was released digitally through the iTunes Music Store. On March 26, 2014, Otsuka released an EP entitled AIO Punch, which included other self-covers from previously released songs. And she also recorded a cover of Dreams Come True's "Romance" for their tribute album Watashi to Dori Kamu: Dreams Come True 25th Anniversary Best Covers, which was released on the same day. Her 23rd single, "More More" was released on May 21, 2014. Otsuka's sixth studio album, entitled Love Fantastic, was released on July 16, 2014. She released her seventh album, Love Tricky, on April 22, 2015. Otsuka's eighth studio album, Love Honey, came out on April 12, 2017.

== Personal life ==
On June 25, 2010, Otsuka married Kazuto Otsuki (publicly known as Su, member of hip hop group Rip Slyme), with whom she collaborated in October 2009 for her song "Aisu x Time". Their first daughter was born on March 24, 2011.

On November 22, 2018, the couple announced their divorce.

== Discography ==
=== Studio albums ===
- 2004: Love Punch
- 2004: Love Jam
- 2005: Love Cook
- 2007: Love Piece
- 2008: Love Letter
- 2014: Love Fantastic
- 2015: Love Tricky
- 2017: Love Honey
- 2021: Love Pop

=== EPs ===
- 2014: Aio Punch
- 2023: Marble
- 2024: Graine

=== Compilation albums ===
- 2007: Ai Am Best
- 2009: Love Is Best
- 2019: Ai Am Best, Too

== Filmography ==
=== Film ===
- 2023: Kyrie

=== Television ===
- Vivant (2026) as a soldier (season 2 ep 15 (5))

== Radio shows ==
- Otsuka Ai ai-r Jack (Nippon Cultural Broadcasting)
- Corolla presents Life-Love Circle (Tokyo FM)

== Books ==
- Kimi-iro Omoi (キミイロオモイ) (February 25, 2005) ISBN 4344007433
- Love World (September 25, 2007) ISBN 4401622650
- Otsuka Ai no Ai-R Jack (大塚 愛のai-r Jack) (January 31, 2008) ISBN 978-4-7897-3251-2
- Neko ga Mitsuketa Akai Fūsen (ネコが見つけた赤い風船) (March 31, 2010) ISBN 9784062160346
- Neko ga Suki ni Natta Kirai na Neko (ネコがスキになったキライなネコ) (March 30, 2012) ISBN 9784062174718

== Awards ==
Japan Cable Radio Awards

- 2004: Best New Artist

Best Hits Kayōsai

- 2004: Best New Artist
- 2005: Gold Artist Prize – "Planetarium"
- 2006: Gold Artist Prize – "Ren'ai Shashin"
- 2007: Gold Artist Prize – "Pocket"

Japan Gold Disc Award

- 2005: Rock & Pop Album of the Year – Love Punch
- 2005: Rock & Pop Album of the Year – Love Jam
- 2006: Rock & Pop Album of the Year – Love Cook
- 2007: The Best 10 Albums - Ai Am Best

MTV Video Music Awards Japan

- 2007: Best Pop Video - "Ren'ai Shashin"
- 2007: Best Video from a Film - "Ren'ai Shashin" (from Tada, Kimi o Aishiteru)

Preceded by Yo Hitoto	Japan Record Award for Best New Artist; 2004	Succeeded by AAA
