= List of Oricon number-one albums of 2009 =

The highest-selling albums and mini-albums in Japan are ranked in the Oricon Weekly Chart, published by Oricon Style magazine. The data is compiled by Oricon based on each album's weekly physical sales. In 2009, 46 albums reached the peak of the charts.

Rock group Unicorn released their comeback album, Chambre, which debuted atop the charts making them the second group after Kaguyahime in 1978 to achieve this feat. Pop group Dreams Come True set the record for most number-one albums by a female vocal group; with their fifteenth studio album, Do You Dreams Come True? [sic], giving them their twelfth number-one album putting them ahead of the late Zard. With the release of her tenth studio album, Next Level, pop artist Ayumi Hamasaki became the first artist to have at least one number-one album for 11 consecutive years since her debut. Ultimate Diamond made pop-rock singer Nana Mizuki the first voice actress to have a number-one album.

The best-selling album overall of 2009 was pop boy band Arashi's greatest-hits album All the Best! 1999–2009, released on August 19, 2009, with the sales of over 1,432,000 copies. The second-best-selling album was pop rock band Mr. Children's studio album Supermarket Fantasy. Supermarket Fantasy was released on December 10, 2008 and sold over 1,251,000 copies. The third-best-selling album was pop vocal group Greeeen's studio album Shio, Koshō, released on June 10, 2009, with the sales of over 1,000,000 copies. The fourth- and fifth-best-selling albums were R&B group Exile's studio album Aisubeki Mirai e and their 2008 compilation album Exile Ballad Best. Aisubeki Mirai e sold over 897,000 copies and Exile Ballad Best sold over 847,000 copies on the yearly charts.

== Chart history ==
Issue Date	Album	Artist(s)	Reference(s)
January 12 (Note: The issue on which My Song Your Song topped is the data of sales in two weeks.)	My Song Your Song	Ikimono-gakari	
January 19	Exile Ballad Best	Exile	
January 26	Code Geass Complete Best	Various artists	
February 2	Touch Me!	Mai Kuraki	
February 9	Trick	Kumi Koda	
February 16	Trick	Kumi Koda	
February 23	Love!: Thelma Love Song Collection	Thelma Aoyama	
March 2	Chambre	Unicorn	
March 9	Answer	Angela Aki	
March 16	Funky Monkey Babys 3	Funky Monkey Babys	
March 23	Remio Best	Remioromen	
March 30	Do You Dreams Come True?	Dreams Come True	
April 6	Next Level	Ayumi Hamasaki	
April 13	Do You Dreams Come True?	Dreams Come True	
April 20	Shōnan no Kaze: Joker	Shōnan no Kaze	
April 27	Puzzle	Kanjani Eight	
May 4	Tsuruno Uta	Takeshi Tsuruno	
May 11	Break the Records: By You & For You	KAT-TUN	
May 18	We All	Hideaki Tokunaga	
May 25	21st Century Breakdown	Green Day	
June 1	Relapse	Eminem	
June 8	Trash We'd Love	The Hiatus	
June 15	Ultimate Diamond	Nana Mizuki	
June 22	Shio, Koshō	Greeeen	
June 29	Shio, Koshō	Greeeen	
July 6	Sanmon Gossip	Ringo Shiina	
July 13	Zankyō	Masaharu Fukuyama	
July 20	Triangle	Perfume	
July 27	Tegomass no Uta	Tegomass	
August 3	Hōkago Tea Time	Hōkago Tea Time	
August 10	Hello-Goodbye	Coming Century	
August 17	Calling	Kobukuro	
August 24	Calling	Kobukuro	
August 31	All the Best! 1999–2009	Arashi	
September 7	All the Best! 1999–2009	Arashi	
September 14	Box Emotions	Superfly	
September 21	All My Best	Mai Kuraki	
September 28	Best Ai	Ai	
October 5	Ayaka's History 2006–2009	Ayaka	
October 12	Ayaka's History 2006–2009	Ayaka	
October 19	Furusato	Yuzu	
October 26	The Best of Aqua Timez	Aqua Timez	
November 2	The Great Vacation Vol.2: Super Best of Glay	Glay	
November 9	This Is It	Michael Jackson	
November 16	The Circle	Bon Jovi	
November 23	Love Is Best	Ai Otsuka	
November 30	Magic	B'z	
December 7	Ima Made no A Men, B Men Dest!?	Greeeen	
December 14	Aisubeki Mirai e	Exile	
December 21	J Album	KinKi Kids	
December 28	Past Future	Namie Amuro	

== See also ==
- 2009 in music
