= Digital distribution =

Delivery method of media content

Digital distribution, also referred to as content delivery, online distribution, or electronic software distribution, among others, is the delivery or distribution of information or materials through digital platforms. The distribution of digital media content may be of digitized versions of analog materials, as well as other materials offered in a purely digital format, such as audio, video, e-books, video games, and other software.

The term is generally used to describe distribution over an online delivery medium, such as the Internet, thus bypassing physical distribution methods, such as paper, optical discs, and VHS videocassettes. The term online distribution is typically applied to freestanding products, with downloadable add-ons for other products are more commonly described as downloadable content. Content distributed online may be streamed or downloaded, and often consists of books, films and television programs, music, software, and video games. Streaming involves downloading and using content at a user's request, or "on-demand", rather than allowing a user to store it permanently. In contrast, fully downloading content to a hard drive or other forms of storage media may allow offline access in the future.

Specialist networks known as content delivery networks help distribute content over the Internet by ensuring both high availability and high performance. Alternative technologies for content delivery include peer-to-peer file sharing technologies. Alternatively, content delivery platforms create and syndicate content remotely, acting like hosted content management systems.

Unrelated to the above, the term "digital distribution" is also used in film distribution to describe the distribution of content through physical digital media, in opposition to distribution by analog media such as photographic film and magnetic tape (see: digital cinema).

== Impact on traditional retail ==
The rise of online distribution has provided controversy for the traditional business models and resulted in challenges as well as new opportunities for traditional retailers and publishers. Online distribution affects all of the traditional media markets, including music, press, and broadcasting. In Britain, the iPlayer, a software application for streaming television and radio, accounts for 5% of all bandwidth used in the United Kingdom.

=== Music ===
The move towards online distribution led to a dip in sales in the 2000s; CD sales were nearly cut in half around this time. One such example of online distribution taking its toll on a retailer is the Canadian music chain Sam the Record Man; the company blamed online distribution for having to close a number of its traditional retail venues in 2007–08. One main reason that sales took such a big hit was that unlicensed downloads of music were very accessible. With copyright infringement affecting sales, the music industry realized it needed to change its business model to keep up with the rapidly changing technology. The step that was taken to move the music industry into the online space has been successful for several reasons. The development of lossy audio compression file formats such as MP3 could take 30 MB for a typical 3-minute song and bring it down to 3 MB without any serious loss of quality. Lossless FLAC files can be up to six times larger than an MP3 while, in comparison, the same song might require 30–40 megabytes of storage on a CD. The smaller file size yields much greater Internet transfer speeds.

The transition into the online space has boosted sales, and profit for some artists. It has also allowed for potentially lower expenses such as lower coordination costs, lower distribution costs, as well as the possibility for redistributed total profits. These lower costs have aided new artists in breaking onto the scene and gaining recognition. In the past, some emerging artists have struggled to find a way to market themselves and compete in the various distribution channels. The Internet may give artists more control over their music in terms of ownership, rights, creative process, pricing, and more. In addition to providing global users with easier access to content, online stores allow users to choose the songs they wish instead of having to purchase an entire album from which there may only be one or two titles that the buyer enjoys.

The number of downloaded single tracks rose from 160 million in 2004 to 795 million in 2006, which accounted for a revenue boost from US$397 million to US$2 billion. Downloading peaked in the US in 2012, after which it started falling due to the rise of music streaming services. In 2017, physical formats overtook downloading again for the first time in six years, but despite the vinyl revival and CDs holding its own, the physical formats account for only 11% revenue as of 2023, while streaming services are dominant with 84% of the US industry.

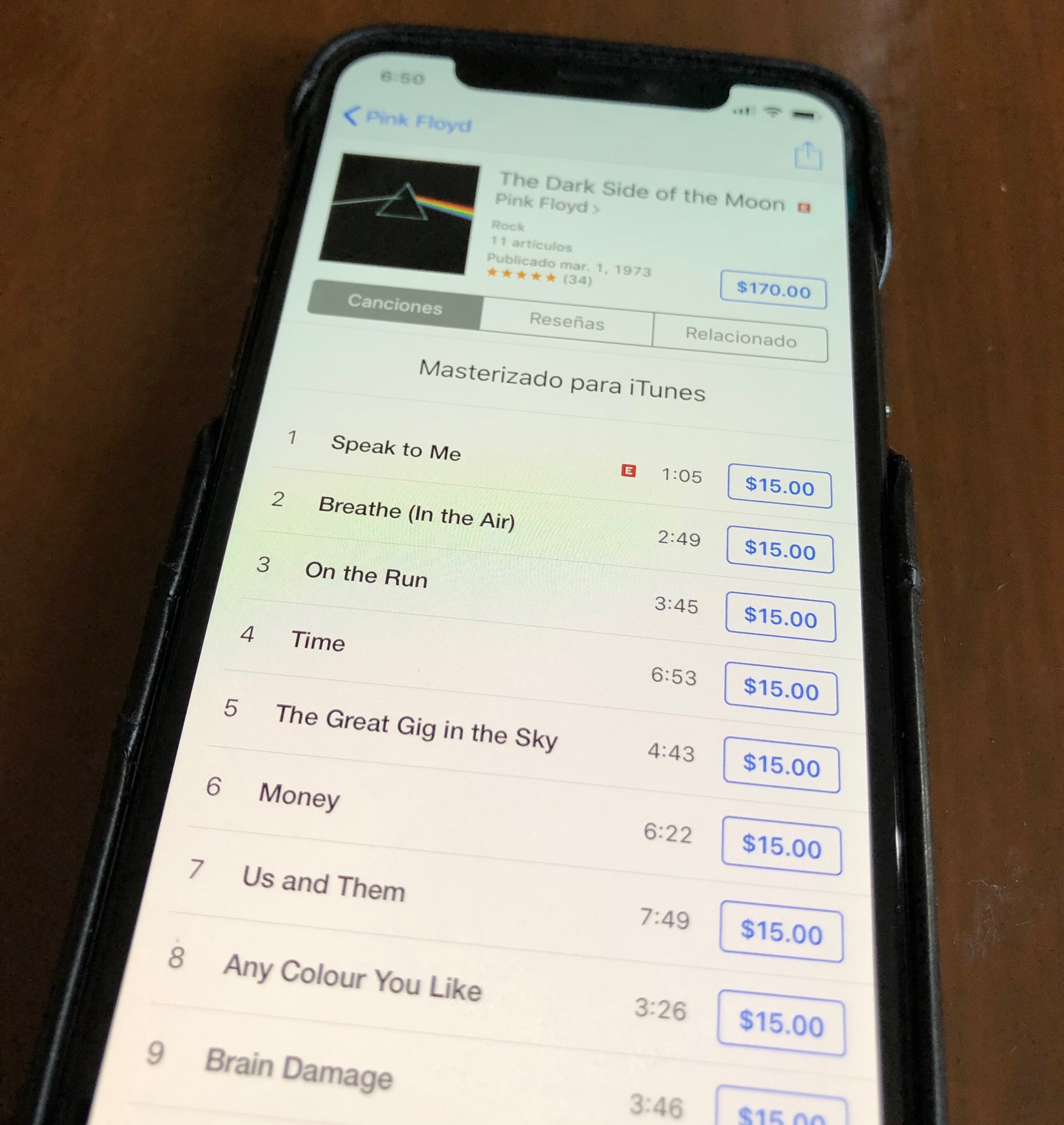
The iTunes Store accessed via a mobile phone, showing Pink Floyd's eighth studio album, The Dark Side of the Moon (1973)

A music download is the digital transfer of music via the internet into a device capable of decoding and playing it, such as a personal computer, portable media player, MP3 player, or smartphone. This term encompasses both legal downloads and downloads of copyrighted material without permission or legal payment. Music downloads are typically encoded with the MP3 audio coding format. or using the modified discrete cosine transform (MDCT) audio data compression, particularly the Advanced Audio Coding (AAC) format used by iTunes.

Since the advent of streaming, downloads as a mode of music distribution has seen a steady decline from its peak in the early 2010s. According to a Nielsen report, downloadable music accounted for 55.9 percent of all music sales in the US in 2012. (Note: "All music sales" refers to albums plus track equivalent albums. A track equivalent album equates to 10 tracks.) By the beginning of 2011, Apple's iTunes Store alone made US$1.1 billion of revenue in the first quarter of its fiscal year. According to the RIAA, music downloads peaked at 43% of industry revenue in the US in 2012, and has since fallen to 3% in 2022.

==== Online music store ====
Paid downloads are sometimes encoded with digital rights management that restricts copying the music or playing purchased songs on certain digital audio players. They are almost always compressed using a lossy codec (usually MPEG-1 Layer 3, Windows Media, or AAC), which reduces file size and bandwidth requirements. These music resources have been created as a response to expanding technology and needs of customers who wanted and/or needed easy, quick access to music. Their business models respond to the "download revolution" by making legal services attractive for users.

Even legal music downloads have faced a number of challenges from artists, record labels and the Recording Industry Association of America (RIAA). In July 2007, the Universal Music Group decided not to renew their long-term contracts with iTunes. This decision was primarily based on the issue of pricing of songs, as Universal wanted to be able to charge more or less depending on the artist, a shift away from iTunes' standard—at the time—99 cents per song pricing. Many industry leaders feel that this is only the first of many show-downs between Apple Inc. and the various record labels.

According to research by the website TorrentFreak, 38 percent of Swedish artists support file share downloading and claim that it helps artists in early career stages. Artists, including Swedish rock group Lamont, have profited from file sharing.

==== RIAA against illegal downloading ====
In the early 2000s, the peer-to-peer file sharing company Napster was sued due to mass infringement of music ownership copyrights by a collection of recording companies (A&M Records, Inc. v. Napster, Inc.)—a lawsuit which issued a preliminary injunction for the service and was concluded by the closure of the Napster free music sharing between its users.

The RIAA oversees about 85 percent of published music production, distribution and manufacturing in the United States. Their stated goal is to support artists' creativity and help them not be cheated out of money by illegal downloading. The RIAA launched its first lawsuits of individuals (P2P file swappers) on 8 September 2003, against users who illegally downloaded music files from the Kazaa FastTrack network.

RIAA claimed it filed 750 suits in February 2006 against individuals downloading music files without paying for them in hopes of putting an end to Internet music piracy. With this campaign the RIAA hoped to force people to respect the copyrights of music labels and minimize the number of illegal downloads.

==== Sales records ====
The Official Charts Company began to incorporate downloads in the UK Singles Chart on 17 April 2005, at which time Radio 1 stopped broadcasting the separate download chart, although the chart is still compiled. Initially this was on condition that the song must have a physical media release at the same time; this rule was fully lifted on 1 January 2007, meaning all download sales are now eligible in the chart.

===== United Kingdom =====
Music downloads have been measured by the Official Charts Company since 2004 and included in the main UK Singles Chart from 2005. Up to November 2022, the most-streamed song in the UK is "Someone You Loved" by Lewis Capaldi, with over 562 million streams.

===== United States =====
In November 2005, the record for the best-selling downloaded single in the United States was held by Gwen Stefani's "Hollaback Girl", which sold over one million downloads, making it the first song to achieve platinum download status. As of July 2012, the record for the best-selling downloaded single in the United States on the iTunes Store is held by The Black Eyed Peas's "I Gotta Feeling", which has sold over 8 million downloads.

Soon after his death in 2009, Michael Jackson became the first artist to sell over one million songs downloaded via the Internet in one week. However, Adele marks the most downloads sold by a single song in a week, with "Hello" selling 1.12 million copies in November 2015.

Eminem's seventh studio album, Recovery (2010), became the first album to sell one million digital copies.

Beyoncé's self-titled fifth studio album became the fastest-selling album within 24 hours in iTunes history after its release in December 2013. Within 24 hours of availability, the album sold 430,000 digital copies. Adele's third studio album 25 became the fastest-selling album in a week in iTunes history after it was released on 20 November 2015. It sold 1.64 million digital copies in its first week (included preorders on the iTunes store since the release of the album's lead single "Hello" in October 2015).

===== Japan =====
In 2006, the Recording Industry Association of Japan began issuing certifications for digitally released music in Japan, compiling data from the early 2000s onwards. The best-selling song is Fukushima-based vocal group Greeeen's song "Kiseki" (2008), which was certified for being legally downloaded four million times between 2008 and 2015, followed by R&B singer Thelma Aoyama's "Soba ni Iru ne" (2008) featuring rapper SoulJa, which was certified for three million downloads between 2008 and 2014. Greeeen's song "Ai Uta" (2007) ranks as the third highest certified song, with 2.5 million downloads tracked between 2007 and 2009. Two more songs have sold more than two million paid downloads: Ayaka's "Mikazuki" (2006) and Kobukuro's "Tsubomi" (2007). The most successful ringtone in Japan is Moldovan-Romanian band O-Zone's "Dragostea din tei" (2003), known locally as "Koi no Maiahi" (恋のマイアヒ), which was certified as having four million units sold.

In Japan, only two albums have received digital certifications by the RIAJ. The first was Songs for Japan (2011), a charity compilation album raising profits for the 2011 Tōhoku earthquake and tsunami, which was certified gold for 100,000 downloads in June 2011. The second album was the Japanese language cast recording of the Frozen soundtrack, which sold 100,000 copies between its release in March 2014 and January 2015.

===== South Korea =====
In South Korea, Circle Digital Chart has been tracking digital sales since 2009. The most successful song according to their published data is Busker Busker's "Cherry Blossom Ending" (2012), which was downloaded over 7 million times between 2012 and 2017. In 2011, "Roly-Poly" by T-ara was the most successful song of the year, selling 4.1 million digital copies. "Roly Poly" also became the fastest-selling song in Korea's history and the first to reach more than 4 million downloads in a calendar year (within 5 months). In 2012, this accolade went to Psy's "Gangnam Style", after selling 3.8 million units.

==== See also ====
- Comparison of on-demand music streaming services
- List of most-streamed songs in the United Kingdom
- On air on sale
- Open music model – Framework for the recording industry
- Top 50 certified music artists (USA digital singles)
- United States v. ASCAP – American legal case

=== Videos ===
With the advancement of network bandwidth capabilities, online distribution became prominent in the 21st century, with prominent platforms such as Amazon Video, and Netflix's streaming service starting in 2007.

Many traditional network television shows, movies and other video content is now available online, either from the content owner directly or from third-party services. YouTube, Netflix, Hulu, Vudu, Amazon Prime Video, DirecTV, SlingTV and other Internet-based video services allow content owners to let users access their content on computers, smartphones, tablets or by using appliances such as video game consoles, set-top boxes or Smart TVs.

Many film distributors also include a Digital Copy, also called Digital HD, with Blu-ray disc, Ultra HD Blu-ray, Blu-ray 3D or a DVD.

=== Books ===
Some companies, such as Bookmasters Distribution, which invested US$4.5 million in upgrading its equipment and operating systems, have had to direct capital toward keeping up with the changes in technology. The phenomenon of books going digital has given users the ability to access their books on handheld digital book readers. One benefit of electronic book readers is that they allow users to access additional content via hypertext links. These electronic book readers also give users portability for their books since a reader can hold multiple books depending on the size of its hard drive. Companies that are able to adapt and make changes to capitalize on the digital media market have seen sales surge. Vice President of Perseus Books Group stated that since shifting to electronic books (e-books), it saw sales rise by 68%. Independent Publishers Group experienced a sales boost of 23% in the first quarter of 2012 alone.

Tor Books, a major publisher of science fiction and fantasy books, started to sell e-books DRM-free by July 2012. One year later the publisher stated that they will keep this model as removing DRM was not hurting their digital distribution ebook business. Smaller e-book publishers such as O'Reilly Media, Carina Press and Baen Books had already forgone DRM previously.

=== Video games ===
Online distribution changed the structure of the video game industry. Gabe Newell, creator of the digital distribution service Steam, formulated the advantages over physical retail distribution as such:

The worst days [for game development] were the cartridge days for the NES. It was a huge risk – you had all this money tied up in silicon in a warehouse somewhere, and so you'd be conservative in the decisions you felt you could make, very conservative in the IPs you signed, your art direction would not change, and so on. Now it's the opposite extreme: we can put something up on Steam, deliver it to people all around the world, make changes. We can take more interesting risks.[...] Retail doesn't know how to deal with those games. On Steam [a digital distributor] there's no shelf-space restriction.

— Gabe Newell, Rock, Paper, Shotgun (2007)

Since the 2000s, there has been an increasing number of smaller and niche titles available and commercially successful, e.g. remakes of classic games. The new possibility of the digital distribution stimulated also the creation of game titles of very small video game producers like Independent game developer and Modders (e.g. Garry's Mod), which were before not commercially feasible.

The years after 2004 saw the rise of many digital distribution services on the PC, such as Amazon Services, Desura, GameStop, Games for Windows – Live, Impulse, Steam, Origin, Battle.net, Direct2Drive, GOG.com, Epic Games Store and GamersGate. The offered properties differ significantly: while most of these digital distributors do not allow reselling of bought games, Green Man Gaming allows this. Another example is gog.com which has a strict non-DRM policy while most other services allow various (strict or less strict) forms of DRM.

Digital distribution is also more eco-friendly than physical. Optical discs are made of polycarbonate plastic and aluminum. The creation of 30 of them requires the use of 300 cubic feet of natural gas, two cups of oil and 24 gallons of water. The protective cases for an optical disc is made from polyvinyl chloride (PVC), a chemical that is dangerous to produce, vinyl chloride monomer being a known carcinogen.

== Challenges ==
A general issue is the large number of incompatible data formats in which content is delivered, possibly restricting the devices that may be used, or making data conversion necessary. Streaming services can have several drawbacks: requiring a constant Internet connection to use content; the restriction of some content to never be stored locally; the restriction of content from being transferred to physical media; and the enabling of greater censorship at the discretion of owners of content, infrastructure, and consumer devices.

Decades after the launch of the World Wide Web, in 2019 businesses were still adapting to the evolving world of distributing content digitally—even regarding the definition and understanding of basic terminology.

== See also ==
- App store
- Digital ecosystem
- Online shopping
- Cloud gaming
- Comparison of digital music stores
- Content delivery network
- Digital distribution of video games
- Ebook
- Electronic publishing
- E-commerce
- Film distribution
- Film distributor
- Internet pornography
- List of mobile app distribution platforms
- Streaming media
- Uberisation
- Video on demand
