= Yume =

Yume (夢) is the Japanese word for dream, and may refer to:

== People ==
- Yume Hirano (平野 優芽; born 2000), Japanese rugby sevens player
- Yume Minamino (南埜 佑芽; born 2011), Japanese artistic gymnast
- Yume Miyamoto (宮本 侑芽; born 1997), Japanese actress
- Yume Okuroda (大黒田 裕芽; born 1994), Japanese rugby sevens player
- Yume Shinjo (新條 由芽; born 1998), Japanese gravure idol and actress
- Yume Takikawa (滝川 結女; born 1999), Japanese professional footballer

== Entertainment ==
- YuMe, a multi-screen video advertising platform
- Dreams (1990 film), a film by the Japanese director Akira Kurosawa
- "Yume" (The Blue Hearts song), a 1992 song by The Blue Hearts

== Characters ==
- Yume, a character in the manga series Tenchi Muyo!
- Yume Hasegawa, a character in the manga series Pupa
- Yume Hinata, a character in the anime Mewkledreamy
- Yume Nijino, a character in the anime Aikatsu Stars!
- Yume Suzuhara, a character in the manga series Hōzuki Island and Mōryō no Yurikago

== Places ==
- Yume, Tibet, a township in Tibet
- Yume Chu, a tributary of Subansiri River in Tibet

== See also ==
- Hana to Yume, a shōjo manga magazine
- Nagai Yume, a Japanese television drama show
- Yume Bitsu, an American psychedelic rock band
- Yume Nikki, a 2005 independent video game by homebrew Japanese developer Kikiyama
- Yume Tsukai, a 2001 Japanese manga and anime series
- "Yume wa Yoru Hiraku", a 1970 Japanese song
