= Hajimemashite =

Hajimemashite (はじめまして) is a Japanese greeting.

It may refer to:

- Hajimemashite (Miyuki Nakajima album), released in 1984
- Ā, Domo. Hajimemashite, a 2007 album by the Japanese band GReeeeN
- Hajimemashite, a one-time manga by Aoi Hiiragi
- “Hajimemashite”, a 2011 single by the Japanese girl-group LinQ
- “Hajimemashite”, a song on the 2002 album Live from the Lake Coast by Umphrey's McGee
