= Ima Made no A Men, B Men Dest!? =

Greatest hits album by Greeeen
- Released: November 25, 2009
- Genre: Pop rock
- Length: 56:31 (Disc 1); 45:02 (Disc 2); 7:45 (Bonus Disc)
- Label: Universal Music Japan
- Producer: Jin

Greeeen chronology
Shio, Koshō (2009)	Ima Made no A Men, B Men Dest!? (2009)

Ima Made no A Men, B Men Dest!? (いままでのA面、B面ですと!?, Ima Made no Ē men, Bī men Desuto!?; All of A Sides and B Sides until Now!?) is the greatest hits album by Japanese group Greeeen, released on November 25, 2009. There is a limited edition of the album, Super Dest!? Box, which has the bonus Compact Disc NG Dest!?.

Imamade no A Men, B Men Desuto!? debuted at No. 1 on Oricon weekly charts. The album received Triple Platinum certification from the Recording Industry Association of Japan (RIAJ) for its shipment of 750,000 copies.

== Track listing ==
=== Disc One: A Men Dest ===
1. Michi (道, Road)
2. High G.K Low (HIGH G.K LOW〜ハジケロ〜)
3. Ai Uta (愛唄, Love Song)
4. Hito (人, Human)
5. Be Free
6. Namidazora (涙空, Teary Sky)
7. Tabidachi (旅立ち, Departure)
8. Kiseki (キセキ, Miracle)
9. Tobira (扉, Door)
10. Fuyu no Aru Hi no Uta (冬のある日の唄, The Song of A Day in Winter)
11. Ayumi (歩み, Walk)
12. Setsuna (刹那, Moment)
13. Haruka (遥か, Far and Away)

=== Disc Two: B Men Dest ===
1. Kizuna (絆, Bond)
2. Dream
3. Unity
4. Machi (街, Town)
5. Tōzainanboku (東西南北, North, South, East and West)
6. Rookies (ルーキーズ)
7. Kimiomoi (君想い, Thinking of You)
8. Shōnen ga yue no Jonetsu (少年が故の情熱, Ebullience because of being A Boy)
9. Anokoro Kara (あの頃から, From That Day)
10. Ameagari (アメアガリ, After the Rain)
11. Koe (声, Voice)

== Charts ==
Release	Oricon Albums Chart	Peak position	Debut sales (copies)	Sales total (copies)
November 25, 2009	Daily Charts	1	52,452	537,434
November 25, 2009	Weekly Charts	1	255,201	537,434
November 25, 2009	Monthly Charts (November 2009)	2	255,201	537,434
November 25, 2009	Yearly Charts (2009)	17	376,424	537,434
November 25, 2009	Yearly Charts (2010)	37	181,889	537,434
