= Days no mo =

Japanese girl group

- Also known as: whiteeeen, whiteeeen²
- Origin: Japan
- Genre: J-pop
- Years active: 2014–present
- Label: Zen Music
- Members: moca akagi nene Fu-ka; Mizuki
- Past members: meri kana hima noa
- Website: whiteeeen.com

Days no mo, formerly known as Whiteeeen (stylized as whiteeeen) is a Japanese vocal group, produced by senior vocal group Greeeen. Its members, who debuted in their teens, keep their identities concealed from the public.

== History ==
A live-action film adaptation of Strobe Edge was announced in the August 2014 issue of Bessatsu Margaret, and in October, it announced that Greeeen's song, "Ai Uta", would be the theme song for the film, as the song was released in 2007 when Greeeen debuted, and that it was relevant to the protagonist's mood. An audition was held for girls between 15 and 29 to record their own versions of the song and post it to Greeeen's official Line account.

Among the contestants, 11 were selected and screened by Greeeen and their producer, Jin. They selected 15-year-old Meri and Kana, 16-year-old Hima and 17-year-old Noa, and debuted under the name "Whiteeeen", a portmanteau of "white" and "teen", with the four e's representing the number of members. Greeeen, who coined the name, hope that the four members would "never forget their pure and white moods" during their future musical activities, hence the "white" in their name. Their cover of "Ai Uta" was also re-titled "Ai Uta (Since 2007)". The members' identities remain hidden, and they did not attend public events; they are displayed as cartoon-drawn images of themselves.

"Ai Uta ~since 2007~" was released in both CD and digital formats in March 2015, and it reached number 1 on various weekly charts, including iTunes, RecoChoku and 8 other platforms. They released their second single, "Pocket" (ポケット), written by Greeeen, as the theme song to Nippon Animation's 40th anniversary film Sinbad: Sora Tobu Hime to Himitsu no Shima.

In the same year, Whiteeeen recorded one of the songs for Soredemo Boku wa Kimi ga Suki, "Ano Koro (Jin Jin Bao Zhuo Ni) " (あの頃～ジンジンバオヂュオニー～), a Japanese-language cover of Hu Xia's song "Those Years" (那些年), the theme song for You Are the Apple of My Eye.

On March 9, 2016, Whiteeeeen released their first mini-album, Koe (声), its cover featuring the backs of the members. On August 17, they released their third single, "Kiseki (Mirai e)" (キセキ～未来へ～), which was used as the theme song to Aozora Yell. On December 14, they released their first full-length album, Zero Koi.

On October 31, 2017, Meri announced her graduation from the group, and auditions were held for her replacement. In April 2018, Moca, Nene and Akagi were announced as new members, and the group was renamed as "Whiteeeen2". They released their single, "Honey Toast" on June 6.

On August 26, 2019, their official website announced the graduation of Hima, Noa, and Kana. On July 27, Fu-ka and Mizuki joined the group, which has been rebranded as Days no mo; they released the digital single "Never" three days later.

== Discography ==
=== Albums ===
Title	Peak chart position	Album details
Title	JPN Oricon	Album details
Zero Koi		Released: December 14, 2016; Format: LP, digital download; Label: Zen Music

=== Mini-albums ===
Title	Peak chart position	Album details
Title	JPN Oricon	Album details
Koe	50	Released: March 9, 2016; Format: LP, digital download; Label: Zen Music

=== Singles ===
List of singles, with selected chart positions and certifications
Year	Title	Peak chart positions	Album
Year	Title	JPN Oricon	Album
2015	"Ai Uta ~since 2007~" (愛唄〜since 2007〜)	16	Koe
2015	"Pocket" (ポケット)	128	Koe
2016	"Kiseki ~Mirai e~" (キセキ～未来へ～)	42	Zero Koi
2017	"Tetote" (テトテ with GReeeeN)	39	Non-album single
2018	"Honey Toast" (ハニートースト)	87	Non-album single

=== Featured works ===
Year	Title	Artist
2017	"Tetote to Tentoten" (テトテとテントテン with whiteeeen)	Greeeen

== Awards ==
=== Japan Gold Disc Awards ===
Year	Nominee / work	Award	Result
2015	Whiteeeen	Best 5 New Artists	Won
