= Strobe Edge =

Japanese manga series by Io Sakisaka

- Cover of the first manga volume

ストロボ・エッジ (Sutorobo Ejji)
- Genre: Coming-of-age, romance
- Manga
- Written by: Io Sakisaka
- Published by: Shueisha
- English publisher: NA: Viz Media
- Magazine: Bessatsu Margaret
- Original run: June 13, 2007 – August 11, 2010
- Volumes: 10
- Live-action film
- Directed by: Ryūichi Hiroki
- Written by: Sayaka Kuwamura
- Studio: Toho
- Released: March 14, 2015
- Television drama
- Directed by: Masato Kimura; Yusuke Matsuda
- Written by: Sayaka Kuwamura
- Music by: Masaru Yokoyama
- Original network: Wowow
- Original run: October 31, 2025 – February 13, 2026
- Episodes: 12

Strobe Edge (Japanese: ストロボ・エッジ, Hepburn: Sutorobo Ejji) is a Japanese manga series written and illustrated by Io Sakisaka. It began serialization in 2007 in the shōjo manga magazine Bessatsu Margaret and ended in 2010. The chapters are collected and bound in tankōbon format by Shueisha under the Margaret Comics label. The manga is licensed in North America by Viz Media with its first volume released in November 2012. A live-action film adaptation had its theatrical release on March 14, 2015, and a live-action television drama adaptation aired in two seasons from October 31, 2025 to February 13, 2026.

== Plot ==
First-year high school student Ninako Kinoshita has never been in love with anyone until she meets popular schoolmate Ren Ichinose while boarding the train for school. She gradually falls in love with him as she gets to know him, though she has to face the truth that Ren is already in a committed relationship with Mayuka Korenaga, a model and the older sister of her friend Daiki, whose love confession Ninako rejects and whose subsequent up-and-down relationship with Ninako's best friend Sayuri Uehara becomes the series' secondary plot. Through Ren, Ninako is also introduced to his friend Takumi Ando who, despite his womanizing tendency, genuinely falls in love with her.

Ninako and Ren are then thrown into situations that require them to be close together, such as working part-time at the same restaurant and being chosen to buy supplies for the summer festival. Gradually, Ren begins to develop feelings for Ninako, but he is adamant in his choice to stay with Mayuka. Realizing that this act is hurting the both of them, Mayuka chooses to break up with Ren. At the same time, Ando continues to urge Ninako to move on from Ren and be his girlfriend. Once while with Ninako, Ando is confronted by Mao Sugimoto, an ex-girlfriend who cheated on him by kissing Ren, causing their breakup and Ando's friendship with Ren to grow strained.

In the next school year, Ninako gets to be in the same class as Ren and Ando, while Mao enrolls in the same school as them as a freshman, irritating Ando. Ninako and Ren continue to develop feelings for each other. Mao meets with Ninako and urges her to stop following Ren because she wants him and Ando reconcile. When Ando confronts Mao about this, she states that she wants Ninako and Ren to drift apart so Ando can pursue Ninako, to atone for what Mao (who still loves Ando) did to him before. Not knowing the reason, Ninako begins to avoid and ignore Ren, who has begun to pursue her so he can confess. When he does, Ninako declines without reason, and when he insists, she becomes upset and tells him to leave her alone. She is, however, encouraged by Ando to stop pitying him and instead follow her heart. Realizing that what she has done is selfish, Ninako goes after the dejected Ren and confesses to him, which he immediately accepts.

== Main characters ==
- Ninako Kinoshita (木下 仁菜子, Kinoshita Ninako) Voiced by: Ayako Kawasumi (vomic), Aki Toyosaki (drama CD), Actor: Kasumi Arimura (movie), Riko Fukumoto (series)

Ninako is the main female protagonist around whom the story revolves. She is a very kind and gentle girl who falls in love with Ren Ichinose. When she finds out that Ren already has a girlfriend, she resigns herself to being just a friend, quietly holding on to her feelings. She is good at most of her subjects with the exclusion of math, which she mentions a number of times is her weakest subject. Ninako is very caring and modest, willing to return any favor even if it is something small. Later on, when Ando tries to convince her to go out with him, she rejects him, saying that being in a relationship with someone she does not love is not right. She wants to remain in her feelings of liking Ren, even if they are not reciprocated.

- Ren Ichinose (一ノ瀬 蓮, Ichinose Ren) Voiced by: Mamoru Miyano (vomic), Yūichi Nakamura (drama CD), Actor: Sota Fukushi (movie), Kyōhei Takahashi (series)

The male school idol who is basically good at everything and plays the role of main male protagonist. He likes to isolate himself from most students. He is admired by all of the female students as a result. He has a close group of male friends, but the story gives the impression most other male students are jealous of his position. He also has a strong passion for mathematics. Although he has a girlfriend, Mayuka, who is older than he is, Ren tends to lose his guard around Ninako. He only later on realizes his feelings for Ninako, but tries to forget about her by distancing himself for Mayuka's sake. In the end, Mayuka breaks up with him because she realized his feelings toward Ninako, reasoning as well she treats work more important than love. Ren's feelings toward Ninako grows stronger, eventually making him unable to hide it any longer.

- Daiki Korenaga (是永大樹, Korenaga Daiki) Voiced by: Tomoaki Maeno (vomic), Tetsuya Kakihara (drama CD), Actor: Jingi Irie (movie), Motoki Nakazawa (series)

Daiki is introduced as a childhood friend of Ninako's. He has strong feelings towards her at the beginning of the story. He grew attached to Ninako after his parents divorced two or three years prior to the start of the manga, causing him to whether to live with his mother and older sister or with his father. Since choosing to live with his father, his relationship with his older sister has not been so good. He eventually falls in love with Ninako's friend Sayuri and starts dating her.

- Takumi Ando (安堂拓海, Andō Takumi) Voiced by: Tsubasa Yonaga (vomic), Kenn (drama CD), Actor: Yuki Yamada (movie), Kōki Yamashita (series)

Ando is Ren's middle school friend who also has an idol-like status. He often finds himself competing with Ren like a rival. Ando takes advantage of his position and is a big time player among the female students. Despite this, he forms no relationships with them as he believes himself not fit for a relationship. This opinion changes after meeting Ninako, who has a strong effect upon him. He eventually falls madly in love with her, saying that he loves her honesty and begins trying to win her favor. He is very much aware of her feelings for Ren and often tries to help her through Ren's relationship with Mayuka or discourage her from pursuing Ren.

- Mayuka Korenaga (是永 麻由香, Korenaga Mayuka) Voiced by: Yui Shōji (vomic and drama CD), Actor: Arisa Sato (movie), Ririka Tanabe (series)

Mayuka is Daiki's older sister. Her existence is kept low profile to a point where it is found that she is actually the girlfriend of the unobtainable Ren Ichinose. She has a job in the modelling business which she pursued for what she thought was Ren's sake. She is currently studying for entrance exams to university. As the series progresses, she becomes wary of Ninako's relationship with Ren but remains friendly toward her. She eventually realizes how much her relationship with Ren is strained; she is almost always busy and has to cancel their dates. In chapter 19, she breaks up with Ren because she knows that Ren is in love with someone else and she doesn't want Ren to continually repress his feelings just for her. She acknowledges that nothing will ever stay the same, as she herself has changed, and that before she didn't want Ren to change and leave her.

- Sayuri Uehara (上原さゆり, Uehara Sayuri) Voiced by: Ayumi Fujimura (vomic), Miyuki Sawashiro (drama CD), Actor: Ena Koshino (movie), Nao Kosaka (series)

Sayuri, nicknamed "Sayu" (さゆ) by her friends, is the mature friend of Ninako's who falls in love with Daiki, whom she eventually dates. However, their relationship is not without bumps. Sayuri becomes afraid of confrontation with Daiki when she believes he is cheating on her. Her worries about honesty in relationships comes from her boyfriend in middle school being snatched away from her.

- Tsukasa (つかさ, Tsukasa) Actor: Kaoru Matsuo (movie)

Tsukasa is a friend of Ninako's who tends to be a blabbermouth. Despite this, she remains loyal to Ninako and often encourages her in love. She has wavy hair often tied into a ponytail.

- Noriko (典子, Noriko) Voiced by: Saki Fujita (vomic)

Noriko, known as "Non-chan" (のんちゃん) to her peers, is a friend of Ninako. She has long, straight hair.

- Tamaki (環, Tamaki) Voiced by: Ayaka Shimizu (vomic), Aira Yūki (drama CD)

Tamaki is a friend of Ninako. She has short, wavy hair.

- Manabu Miyoshi (三好 学, Miyoshi Manabu) Voiced by: Hiro Shimono (drama CD), Tsubasa Nakagawa

Manabu, more commonly known as "Gacchan" (がっちゃん) to his peers, is one of Ren's friends and one of Tsukasa's classmates from middle school. His cousin owns a café, where he works to earn money to visit his senior Ritsuko. He notices Ren's feelings for Ninako early on and desperately tries to pair them up.

- Yūtarō Terada (寺田 裕太郎, Terada Yūtarō) Voiced by: Yūki Kaji (drama CD), Sora Inoue

Yūtarō, nicknamed "Yū" and "Tera" by his peers, is one of Ren's friends at school. He is both sagely and mature. Unlike Manabu, he tends to be more realistic and is reluctant over Manabu's matchmaking attempts because of Ren's increasing anxiety over Mayuka. In middle school, he attended the same cram school as Sayuri Uehara, and they began dating. However, they broke up abruptly when Sayuri assumed Yū was cheating on her. Yū regrets hurting Sayuri and realizes their relationship failed because of lack of communication and because of his immaturity. However, he knows that they cannot return to the way they were. Instead, he encourages Sayuri to make peace with Daiki when troubles appear in their relationship (even though he is still in love with her), and tries to move on from her once she has done so.

- Mao Sugimoto (杉本真央, Sugimoto Mao) Actor: Yuina Kuroshima (movie)

Mao is a student junior to Ninako and the others. In middle school, she dated Ando, but only used him to get close to Ren, whom she had a crush on. She later fell in love with Ando for real. When Mao enrolls into their high school, Ando's refusal to listen to her leads her into deliberately stopping Ninako from pursuing Ren so that Ando would have a chance to win her over.

== Media ==
=== Manga ===
No.	Original release date	Original ISBN	English release date	English ISBN
1	November 22, 2007	978-4-08-846239-4	November 6, 2012	978-1-4215-5068-8
2	March 25, 2008	978-4-08-846280-6	January 1, 2013	978-1-4215-5069-5
3	July 25, 2008	978-4-08-846316-2	March 5, 2013	978-1-4215-5070-1
4	November 25, 2008	978-4-08-846357-5	May 7, 2013	978-1-4215-5270-5
5	March 25, 2009	978-4-08-846394-0	July 2, 2013	978-1-4215-5313-9
6	June 25, 2009	978-4-08-846420-6	September 3, 2013	978-1-4215-5314-6
7	November 25, 2009	978-4-08-846466-4	November 5, 2013	978-1-4215-5315-3
8	March 12, 2010	978-4-08-846501-2	January 7, 2014	978-1-4215-5316-0
9	August 11, 2010	978-4-08-846554-8	March 4, 2014	978-1-4215-5317-7
10	December 24, 2010	978-4-08-846607-1	May 6, 2014	978-1-4215-6448-7

A forty-three page bonus chapter, to commemorate the release of the live-action film, was printed in the April 2015 issue of Betsuma.

=== Drama CDs ===
Strobe Edge originally had a vomic (voiceover comic) produced by Shueisha, where voice actors provided voices to manga panels. Once plans for drama CDs were made, Shueisha closed down the vomic website. Two drama CDs were released, the first on August 25, 2010, and the second on September 22, 2010. The drama CDs used an entirely new voice cast with the exception of Yui Shōji, who was the only one to reprise her role as Mayuka Korenaga.

=== Live-action film ===
A live-action film adaptation of Strobe Edge was announced to have been greenlit on the August 2014 issue of Bessatsu Margaret. The adaptation had its theatrical release on March 14, 2015. The film was directed by Ryūichi Hiroki and stars Kasumi Arimura as Ninako Kinoshita and Sota Fukushi as Ren Ichinose. Japanese vocal group Greeeen provided a cover version of their hit song "Ai Uta" (愛唄) sung by a sister female vocalist group Whiteeeen.

=== Live-action drama ===
A live-action television drama adaptation was announced in August 2025, ten years after the film adaptation, and aired in two seasons on Wowow from October 31, 2025, to February 13, 2026.

== Reception ==
Strobe Edge received moderate success in Japan. The fourth volume charted at #29 on Oricon during the first week of sales, selling a total of 34,158 copies. The fifth volume ranked at #19 and sold 46,299 copies on its first week of sales. The release of the sixth volume peaked at #24 and sold 51,402 copies. The seventh volume charted at #9 and sold 82,575 copies on its first week and 109,758 in total. The eighth volume charted at #7 and sold 76,372 copies on its first week and 137,087 in total. The ninth volume charted at #4 and sold 152,907 copies on its first week and 211,188 in total. The final volume charted at #3 and sold 132,738 copies on its first week of sales. It became the 43rd best-selling volume of the first half of 2011, selling a total of 356,021 copies.

In a poll done by Escala Cafe in April 2011, out of 316 votes from women from the ages of 22 and 29, 2.5% were interested in a live-action adaptation of Strobe Edge.

It was chosen as one of the Great Graphic Novels 2014 in the fiction section by the Young Adult Library Services Association and also as one of the 2014 Top Ten Great Graphic Novels for Teens in the fiction section.

The live-action film adaptation "earned $2.74 million in its opening frame for the number three spot" at the Japanese Box Office, according to Mark Schilling, writing for Variety after its opening weekend. Schilling noted that "distributor Toho expects the film to finish with JPY2.5 billion ($20.6 million)." The film grossed ¥2.32 billion.
