= Hozuki (disambiguation) =

Hozuki (or hōzuki) is the Japanese name of the plant Alkekengi officinarum.

Hozuki (or hōzuki) may also refer to:

- Hōzuki-san Chi no Aneki, a manga series by Ran Igarashi
- Hōzuki Island, a manga series by Kei Sanbe
- Hōzuki no Reitetsu, a manga series by Natsumi Eguchi
- Suigetsu Hozuki, a character in the Naruto manga and anime series
