= Erased (2016 film) =

- Theatrical release poster

Japanese name
- Kanji: 僕だけがいない街
Transcriptions
- Revised Hepburn: Boku Dake ga Inai Machi
- Directed by: Yūichirō Hirakawa
- Written by: Noriko Gotō
- Based on: Boku Dake ga Inai Machi by Kei Sanbe
- Produced by: Kei Haruna; Jungo Maruta; Masahiro Uchiyama
- Starring: Tatsuya Fujiwara; Kasumi Arimura; Rio Suzuki; Tsubasa Nakagawa; Kento Hayashi; Tamae Andō; Yasushi Fuchikami; Tsutomu Takahashi; Mitsuhiro Oikawa; Seiji Fukushi; Kanna Mori; Tetta Sugimoto; Yuriko Ishida
- Cinematography: Shigetomo Madarame
- Edited by: Naoya Bando
- Music by: Yuki Hayashi
- Production companies: Asahi Shimbun; CJE-Constantin Film Alliance; GYAO!; Hakuhodo DY Media Partners; Hakuhodo DY Music & Pictures; Heyday Films; Horipro; Kadokawa; Kansai Telecasting Corporation; Office Crescendo; Rakuten; UMG Japan; Warner Bros. Japan
- Distributed by: Warner Bros. Pictures
- Release date: March 19, 2016 (Japan)
- Running time: 120 minutes
- Country: Japan
- Language: Japanese
- Box office: ¥1.4 billion (Japan) ₩33.113 million (Korea)

Boku Dake ga Inai Machi (僕だけがいない街; lit. "The Town Where Only I Am Missing"), localized as Erased, is a 2016 Japanese fantasy mystery thriller film directed by Yūichirō Hirakawa and featuring Tatsuya Fujiwara as Satoru Fujinuma. It is an adaptation of the manga series Boku Dake ga Inai Machi by Kei Sanbe. It premiered in cinemas throughout Japan on March 19, 2016. The theme song is "Hear ~Shinjiaeta Akashi~" (Hear 〜信じあえた証〜, lit. Hear ~A proof that you could trust~) by Chise Kanna. The trailer was released on January 14, 2016.

== Plot ==
The film begins in 2006 with Satoru Fujinuma, an aspiring manga writer who has his manga once again rejected by his publisher, forcing him to continue working as a deliveryman to support himself. Satoru has the ability to "Rewind," in which he is sent back to a point in the near past to prevent a person around him from enduring a fatal accident. One day, Satoru's mother, Sachiko, senses a man about to abduct a girl and makes Satoru remember a tragedy that happened 18 years ago. Sachiko is later murdered when she is alone in Satoru's apartment. Satoru gives chase to the killer but he is captured by police, who accuse him of the murder. His Rewind activates and he is suddenly sent 18 years into the past, back to his elementary school life in Hokkaido.

Trying to adjust, Satoru remembers that his Rewind came before the murder of Kayo Hinazuki, his classmate, by a child serial killer. He befriends the friendless Kayo, learning that she lives with an abusive mother, Akemi, and stepfather. With his friends and mother's help, Satoru convinces Kayo to attend a double birthday party, as the two have the same birthday. Despite these changes, Kayo is still murdered, and in frustration, Satoru is sent back to the present.

Evading the police, Satoru seeks refuge in the house of Airi Katagiri, a high school student who works as a fellow part-time deliveryman. He realizes that while Kayo's death still occurred, its details have changed. Believing that Satoru is innocent, Airi helps him track down Sachiko's killer. However, this only puts her in danger when her house is burned down in an arson attack. Satoru meets his mother's friend, Makoto Sawada, who confirms that Sachiko's killer and the child serial killer are the same person. When Satoru is again captured by the police, he notices that one of his captors is the killer, activating his Rewind and sending him 18 years back once again.

To prevent Kayo from being alone, Satoru takes her away from her mother. He and his friend Kenya Kobayashi place her in an abandoned bus, but when they learn that the bus is the killer's hideout, they move her. Satoru's teacher, Mr. Yashiro, contacts the child abuse prevention center and they take Kayo into custody after Akemi's abuse is revealed. Convinced he needs to prevent more murders, Satoru watches over another quiet classmate, Misato Yanagihara. When he is given a ride home by Yashiro, he realizes that Yashiro is the killer and has deliberately placed Misato as a decoy. To prevent him from interfering again, Yashiro throws Satoru off a bridge and into the river below.

Satoru is sent to the present in 2006, this time to a timeline where both his mother and Kayo, who is now pregnant, are alive, he is no longer estranged from his childhood friends, and his manga is successfully published. At the same time, however, Airi does not recognize him, as he does not work as a deliveryman in the new timeline. Kenya, now a lawyer, helps him track down Yashiro, who works as a councilman. Yashiro tells Satoru his demented motive of murder: he kills to prevent children from having a bleak future. Just when he is about to commit suicide, Satoru stops him, causing himself to get mortally wounded instead. Yashiro is arrested.

Ten years later, Sachiko holds the tenth anniversary of Satoru's death, attended by Kayo, Kayo's daughter, Kenya and others, while Airi, now a photographer, finishes reading Satoru's manga, Boku Dake ga Inai Machi.

== Cast ==
- Tatsuya Fujiwara as Satoru Fujinuma (adult)
  - Tsubasa Nakagawa as Satoru Fujinuma (child)
- Kasumi Arimura as Airi Katagiri
- Rio Suzuki as Kayo Hinazuki (child)
  - Kanna Mori as Kayo Hinazuki (adult)
- Kento Hayashi as Jun Shiratori
- Seiji Fukushi as Kenya Kobayashi
- Tamae Andō as Akemi Hinazuki
- Yasushi Fuchikami as Sudō
- Tsutomu Takahashi as Takahashi
- Mitsuhiro Oikawa as Gaku Yashiro
- Tetta Sugimoto as Makoto Sawada
- Yuriko Ishida as Sachiko Fujinuma

== See also ==
- List of films featuring time loops
