= Erased (manga) =

Japanese manga series and its franchise

- Cover of the first tankōbon volume, featuring Kayo Hinazuki

僕だけがいない街 (Boku dake ga Inai Machi)
- Genre: Mystery, science fiction, thriller
- Manga
- Written by: Kei Sanbe
- Published by: Kadokawa Shoten
- English publisher: Yen Press
- Magazine: Young Ace
- Original run: June 4, 2012 – November 4, 2016
- Volumes: 9
- Series titles
- Erased; (June 4, 2012 – March 4, 2016, 8 volumes); Erased: Re; (June 4, 2016 – November 4, 2016, 1 volume)
Further information
Anime television series
Directed by	Tomohiko Itō
Produced by	Kenta Suzuki; Taku Matsuo
Written by	Taku Kishimoto
Music by	Yuki Kajiura
Studio	A-1 Pictures
Licensed by	AUS: Madman Entertainment; NA: Aniplex of America; UK: Anime Limited
Original network	Fuji TV, Kansai TV (Noitamina)
English network	SEA: Aniplus Asia
Original run	January 8, 2016 – March 25, 2016
Episodes	12
Light novel
Boku dake ga Inai Machi: Another Record
Written by	Hajime Ninomae
Illustrated by	Kei Sanbe
Published by	Bungei Kadokawa
Original run	November 2015 – March 2016
Volumes	1
Television drama
Erased
Directed by	Ten Shimoyama
Written by	Tomomi Okubo
Music by	Kiyoshi Yoshikawa
Studio	Kansai TV
Licensed by	Netflix
Original run	December 15, 2017
Episodes	12
- Live-action film
- Erased (2016 film)
- icon

Erased, known in Japan as Boku dake ga Inai Machi (僕だけがいない街; lit. 'The Town Where Only I Am Missing') (abbreviated BokuMachi (僕街)), is a Japanese manga series written and illustrated by Kei Sanbe. It was serialized in Kadokawa Shoten's Young Ace magazine from June 2012 to March 2016, and is licensed in English by Yen Press. An anime adaptation by A-1 Pictures aired on Fuji TV's Noitamina programming block from January to March 2016, and a live action film was released in March 2016. A live-action drama series was released by Netflix in December 2017. A spin-off manga was published from June to November 2016 and the spin-off novel series by Hajime Ninomae was released in Kadokawa's Bungei Kadokawa magazine from November 2015 to March 2016.

== Plot ==
In 2006, 29-year-old Satoru Fujinuma, a struggling manga artist living in Chiba, possesses an involuntary ability known as "Revival" that sends his consciousness back in time moments before a life-threatening incident, enabling him to prevent it from happening again. When his mother is murdered by an unknown assailant in his own home, Satoru's ability sends him back eighteen years into the past where he is given the opportunity to not only save his mother, but also prevent a serial killer from taking the lives of several of his childhood friends.

== Characters ==
Four major characters of Erased (from left to right): Satoru Fujinuma (29 years old, background), Airi Katagiri, Kayo Hinazuki and Sachiko Fujinuma

Satoru Fujinuma (藤沼 悟, Fujinuma Satoru)
Voiced by: Shinnosuke Mitsushima (adult), Tao Tsuchiya (child) (Japanese); Benjamin Diskin (adult), Michelle Ruff (child) (English)
Played by: Tatsuya Fujiwara (adult, film), Tsubasa Nakagawa (child, film), Yuki Furukawa (adult, drama), Reo Uchikawa (child, drama)
Satoru is a 29-year-old manga artist who also works part-time as a delivery man at Oasi Pizza. Many years ago while he was still a child, his father left him and his mother, for which reason he is living in a single parent home. He possesses an involuntary time-based ability he calls "Revival", which brings him back to a time before a life-threatening incident occurs and allows him to prevent it only by glimpsing a glowing bright blue butterfly, the appearance of which may symbolize the unpredictable effects the unique supernatural ability has not only on himself, but those around him.
Kayo Hinazuki (雛月 加代, Hinazuki Kayo)
Voiced by: Aoi Yūki (Japanese); Stephanie Sheh (English)
Played by: Rio Suzuki (film), Rinka Kakihara (drama)
Kayo is one of Satoru's primary school classmates and is one of the original victims of the serial kidnapping case that occurred 18 years ago.
Airi Katagiri (片桐 愛梨, Katagiri Airi)
Voiced by: Chinatsu Akasaki (Japanese); Cherami Leigh (English)
Played by: Kasumi Arimura (film), Mio Yūki (drama)
Airi is a high school student and Satoru's friendly co-worker at Oasi Pizza. She becomes involved with him when she witnesses oddities such as when he manages to save people from certain life-threatening situations.
Sachiko Fujinuma (藤沼 佐知子, Fujinuma Sachiko)
Voiced by: Minami Takayama (Japanese); Sara Cravens (English)
Played by: Yuriko Ishida (film); Tomoka Kurotani (drama)
Sachiko is Satoru's mother and a former news announcer. Her husband left the family many years ago, causing her to raise Satoru on her own. She possesses a sharp eye and is quick to observe any irregularities.
Jun Shiratori (白鳥 潤, Shiratori Jun)
Voiced by: Takahiro Mizushima (Japanese); Max Mittelman (English)
Played by Kento Hayashi (film); Masato Yano (drama)
Jun is a stuttering food delivery worker who lives in Satoru's hometown and often approaches lone students around his house. He and Satoru play with paper airplanes. Because he advises lonely children to be more "courageous" and make more friends, he is nicknamed "Yuuki" (ユウキ, Yūki), which means courage.
Kenya Kobayashi (小林 賢也, Kobayashi Ken'ya)
Voiced by: Yō Taichi, Tasuku Emoto (adult)^{Ep. 11 credits} (Japanese); Erica Mendez, Xander Mobus (adult) (English)
Played by Seiji Fukushi (film); Jin Shirasu (drama)
Kenya is one of Satoru's primary school classmates who has a strong sense of justice and is known to make insightful choices. He is an aspiring lawyer who has a keen eye.
Gaku Yashiro (八代 学, Yashiro Gaku)
Voiced by: Mitsuru Miyamoto (Japanese); David W. Collins (English)
Played by Shigeyuki Totsugi
Gaku is Satoru's homeroom teacher during his youth and the closest thing he has to a father figure.
Hiromi Sugita (杉田 広美, Sugita Hiromi)
Voiced by: Akari Kitō, Atsushi Tamaru (adult)^{Ep. 11 credits} (Japanese); Christine Marie Cabanos, Kyle McCarley (adult) (English)
Played by Kairi Jo
Hiromi is one of Satoru's primary school classmates who appears feminine even though he is a boy. He is one of the original victims of the serial kidnapping case.
Osamu (修)
Voiced by: Ayaka Nanase (Japanese); Ryan Bartley (English)
Osamu is one of Satoru's primary school classmates.
Kazu (カズ)
Voiced by: Yukitoshi Kikuchi (Japanese); Bobby Thong (English)
Kazu is one of Satoru's primary school classmates. He is much taller and heavier than the rest of Satoru's friends and goes out of his way to appear "masculine".
Aya Nakanishi (中西 彩, Nakanishi Aya)
Voiced by: Sayaka Kaneko^{Ep. 10 credits} (Japanese); Corina Boettger (English)
Aya is a student who attends Izumi Primary and is one of the original victims of the serial kidnapping case.
Misato Yanagihara (柳原 美里, Yanagihara Misato)
Voiced by: Hina Kino^{Ep. 2 credits} (Japanese); Mela Lee (English)
Misato is another classmate of Satoru's. She has a strong dislike for Kayo and she often likes to pick on her.
Akemi Hinazuki (雛月 明美, Hinazuki Akemi)
Voiced by: Akemi Okamura^{Ep. 3 credits} (Japanese); Carrie Keranen (English)
Played by Tamae Ando (film); Noriko Eguchi (drama)
Akemi is Kayo's abusive mother, whose abusive nature was exposed to the public.
Kumi (久美)
Voiced by: Reika Uyama^{Ep. 11 credits}
Played by Miyu Ando
Kumi is a nine-year-old patient who suffers from leukemia.

== Media ==
=== Manga ===
The original manga, written by Kei Sanbe, was serialized in Kadokawa Shoten's Young Ace magazine from the July 2012 issue (shipping date: June 4, 2012) through the April 2016 issue (shipping date: March 4, 2016). The first tankōbon volume was released in Japan on January 26, 2013, and the eighth volume was published on April 27, 2016. The series is licensed by Yen Press, who released the first volume in February 2017. The Yen Press hardcover editions combine two of the original volumes per book, while their ebook editions match the original volume numbering. The series is licensed in France by Ki-oon. Sanbe wrote a spin-off manga titled Erased: Re, which was serialized in Young Ace from June 4, 2016, to November 4, 2016. It was published as the ninth volume of the series in Japanese on February 4, 2017, and in English by Yen Press on September 18, 2018.

==== Volumes ====
No.	Original release date	Original ISBN	English release date	English ISBN
1	January 26, 2013	978-4-04-120557-0	February 21, 2017	978-0-316-55331-5
01. "Life Flashing Before Your Eyes, May 2006" (走馬灯 2006.05, Sōmatō 2006.05); 02. "Death Row Convict, May 2006" (死刑囚 2006.05, Shikeishū 2006.05); 03. "Grim Reaper, May 2006" (死神 2006.05, Shinigami 2006.05); 04. "Attempted Kidnapping, May 2006" (誘拐未遂 2006.05, Yūkai-mizui 2006.05); 05. "The True Culprit, May 2006" (真犯人 2006.05, Shinhanin 2006.05); 06. "Fugitive, February 1988" (逃亡者 1988.02, Tōbōsha 1988.02)
2	June 2, 2013	978-4-04-120701-7	February 21, 2017	978-0-316-55331-5
07. "Lost Time, February 1988" (失われた時間 1988.02, Ushinawareta Jikan 1988.02); 08. "The Town Within Me, February 1988" (私だけがいない街 1988.02, Watashi dake ga Inai Machi 1988.02); 09. "The Beginning of Failure, February 1988" (失敗の始まり 1988.02, Shippai no Hajimari 1988.02); 10. "Christmas Tree, February 1988" (クリスマスツリー 1988.02, Kurisumasu Tsurī 1988.02); 11. "Repeated Scene, February 1988" (くり返す光景 1988.02, Kurikaesu Kōkei 1988.02); 12. "Birthday Party, March 1988" (バースデー・パーティー 1988.03, Bāsudē Pātī 1988.3)
3	December 2, 2013	978-4-04-120911-0	June 20, 2017	978-0-316-46844-2
13. "Whiteout, March 1988" (ホワイトアウト 1988.03, Howaitoauto 1988.03); 14. "Under Siege, May 2006" (四面楚歌 2006.05, Shimensoka 2006.05); 15. "I Want to Believe, May 2006" (信じたい 2006.05, Shinjitai 2006.05); 16. "Mother, May 2006" (母親 2006.05, Hahaoya 2006.05); 17. "Slight Clue, May 2006" (僅かな手がかり 2006.05, Wazukana Tegakari 2006.05); 18. "Time for Farewell, May 2006" (別れの時 2006.05, Wakare no Toki 2006.05)
4	June 3, 2014	978-4-04-101742-5	June 20, 2017	978-0-316-46844-2
19. "Last Chance, February 1988" (ラストチャンス 1988.02, Rasuto Chansu 1988.02); 20. "Superhero, February 1988" (正義の味方 1988.02, Seigi no Mikata 1988.02); 21. "Hiding Place, March 1988" (隠れ家 1988.03, Kakurega 1988.03); 22. "Refuge, March 1988" (カクレガ 1988.03, Kakurega 1988.03); 23. "Going Outside the Loop, March 1988" (輪の外へ 1988.03, Wa no Soto e 1988.03); 24. "Mother and Mother, March 1988" (母と母と 1988.03, Haha to Haha to 1988.03)
5	December 28, 2014	978-4-04-101743-2	November 7, 2017	978-0-316-46845-9
25. "'Back Then' Doesn't Exist Anymore, March 1988" (「あの頃」はもう無い 1988.03, "Ano Koro" wa Mō Nai 1988.03); 26. "Miscarriage of Justice, March 1988" (冤罪事件 1988.03, Enzai Jiken 1988.03); 27. "Abduction, March 1988" (誘拐の条件 1988.03, Yūkai no Jōken 1988.03); 28. "Welcome Home, March 1988" (おかえりなさい 1988.03, Okaerinasai 1988.03); 29. "I'll Be Right Beside You, March 1988" (すぐ側にいる 1988.03, Sugusoba ni Iru 1988.03); 30. "Hunch, March 1988" (確信めいた予感 1988.03, Kakushin-meita Yokan 1988.03)
6	June 5, 2015	978-4-04-103134-6	November 7, 2017	978-0-316-46845-9
31. "Defeat, March 1988" (敗北 1988.03, Haiboku 1988.03); 32. "The Spider's Thread, October 1971 – April 1987" (蜘蛛の糸 1971.10～1987.04, Kumo no Ito 1971.10–1987.04); 33. "Waking, August 2003" (目覚め 2003.08, Mezame 2003.08); 34. "The Locked Door, August 2003 – February 2004" (閉ざされた扉 2003.08～2004.02, Tozasareta Tobira 2003.08–2004.02); 35. "The Key, April 2004" (鍵 2004.04, Kagi 2004.04)
7	December 25, 2015	978-4-04-103675-4	April 10, 2018	978-0-316-46846-6
36. "Starting Point, May 2005" (始まりの地点 2005.05, Hajimari no Chiten 2005.05); 37. "Footsteps, July 2005" (足音 2005.07, Ashioto 2005.07); 38. "Courage, August 2005" (勇気 2005.08, Yūki 2005.08); 39. "Airi, August 2005" (愛梨 2005.08, Airi 2005.08); 40. "The Anticipated Future, August 2005" (待ち焦がれた未来 2005.08, Machikogareta Mirai 2005.08)
8	April 27, 2016	978-4-04-103915-1	April 10, 2018	978-0-316-46846-6
41. "I've Kept You Waiting, August 2005" (待たせたね 2005.08, Mataseta ne 2005.08); 42. "Target, August 2005" (目標 2005.08, Mokuhyō 2005.08); 43. "Confession, August 2005" (告白 2005.08, Kokuhaku 2005.08); 44. "The Town Without Me, January 2012" (僕だけがいない街 2012.01, Boku dake ga Inai Machi 2012.01)
9 RE:	February 4, 2017	978-4-04-104879-5	September 18, 2018	978-1-9753-0174-3
"RE: Kayo Hinazuki"; "RE: Kenya Kobayashi, Part One"; "RE: Kenya Kobayashi, Part Two"; "RE: Sachiko Fujinuma"; "RE: Airi Katagiri"

=== Anime ===
An anime television adaptation produced by A-1 Pictures aired on Fuji TV's Noitamina programming block from January 8 to March 25, 2016, and was simulcast on Crunchyroll, Daisuki, Funimation and AnimeLab. (Note: Fuji TV listed the series premiere on January 7, 2016 at 24:55, which is effectively January 8 at 12:55 a.m. JST.) The series was directed by Tomohiko Itō and written by Taku Kishimoto, with character design by Keigo Sasaki. The opening theme is "Re:Re:" by Asian Kung-Fu Generation, while the ending theme is "Sore wa Chiisana Hikari no Youna" (それは小さな光のような; "It's Like a Small Light") by Sayuri.

The series is licensed in North America by Aniplex of America, in Australia by Madman Entertainment, and in the United Kingdom by Anime Limited. Aniplex of America announced that the series would receive an English dub in May 2016. The series was simulcast in certain countries in Southeast Asia with English subtitles on Aniplus Asia and is available to stream on Iflix in Malaysia, Thailand, the Philippines, Indonesia, Sri Lanka and Brunei with English subtitles. The series also streamed on ITVX in the United Kingdom, with English dub only.

==== Episodes ====
No.	Title (Note: All English titles are taken from Crunchyroll.)	Directed by	Written by	Original release date	Ref.
1	"Flashing Before My Eyes"; Transliteration: "Sōmatō" (Japanese: 走馬灯)	Tomohiko Itō	Taku Kishimoto	January 8, 2016	
In the year 2006, Satoru Fujinuma is a 29-year-old struggling manga artist in Chiba who occasionally experiences a phenomenon he calls "Revival": When a fatal incident is about to occur near him, he is sent a few minutes back in time to prevent it via seeing a bright blue glowing butterfly. He uses this involuntary ability to save a boy from a runaway truck, though he is hospitalized for a few days as a result. As he recovers, his co-worker, Airi Katagiri, praises him for his life-saving efforts. Later, he is visited by his mother, Sachiko, who reminds him of an incident that happened eighteen years ago in their hometown in Hokkaido: An adult named Jun Shiratori (nicknamed "Yuki"), whom Satoru had trusted, was arrested for the kidnapping and murder of three local children, two of which were Satoru's classmates. The next day, as Satoru experiences another Revival, Sachiko takes note of a man who seemingly attempted to kidnap a child. Looking into the matter, Sachiko deduces that the man was the true killer from 18 years ago, but before she can inform anyone, she is murdered in Satoru's apartment. Just as Satoru discovers Sachiko's body and is accused of killing her, his Revival ability, for the first time, goes overboard by sending his 29-year-old consciousness all the way back to 1988 when he was an eleven-year-old elementary school student in Hokkaido.
2	"Palm of the Hand"; Transliteration: "Tenohira" (Japanese: 掌)	Toshimasa Ishii	Taku Kishimoto	January 15, 2016	
As Satoru becomes bewildered with the situation he has been put in, he finds comfort in being able to see his mother again. Realizing being sent to this period by Revival is connected to Sachiko's future murder, Satoru takes notice of Kayo Hinazuki, one of his classmates who was killed by the serial kidnapper, noticing a bruise on her leg. Upon the suggestion of his friend Kenya Kobayashi, Satoru reads an essay written by Kayo, which further hints at her troubled life at home. Wanting to understand Kayo more, Satoru decides to invite her to his birthday party, hoping to change the future so that she will not be killed.
3	"Bruise"; Transliteration: "Aza" (Japanese: 痣)	Takahiro Shikama	Yutaka Yasunaga	January 22, 2016	
During an ice skating race against a classmate, Satoru holds back from winning to avoid inadvertently trying to change the future, angering the classmate and disappointing Kayo. After learning that Kayo's birthday is on the same day as his, March 2, Satoru deduces that she will be abducted on March 1, as the abduction was in March but before her birthday. Satoru spends some time with Yuki, still convinced that he is not the kidnapper. Afterward, Satoru finds Kayo beaten up in her home's shed, learning of the full nature of her abusive relationship with her mother, Akemi. The next day, Satoru speaks with his teacher, Gaku Yashiro, who explains how he has suspected Akemi of abuse for almost a year but hasn't been able to find proof to convict her. Later, Satoru stands up for Kayo when she is accused of stealing the class' lunch money, before taking her up a mountain to show her a frost-laden "Christmas" tree.
4	"Accomplishment"; Transliteration: "Tassei" (Japanese: 達成)	Shinya Watada	Taku Kishimoto	January 29, 2016	
With help from Sachiko, Satoru manages to invite Kayo out with him to the local science center. During the outing, Satoru feels a sense of déjà vu, becoming worried that he's repeating the same things. After March 1, the day Kayo originally disappeared, passes without incident, both Satoru and Kayo are able to celebrate their birthday the next day, with Satoru confident he has managed to change history. The following day, however, Satoru is shocked to find Kayo has not come to school.
5	"Getaway"; Transliteration: "Tōbō" (Japanese: 逃亡)	Makoto Hoshino	Taku Kishimoto	February 5, 2016	
As Satoru becomes angry that he was not able to make a difference about Kayo's disappearance, another schoolgirl goes missing several days later. After witnessing Akemi throw out Kayo's belongings, Satoru suddenly finds himself back in 2006, still under suspicion of Sachiko's murder and forced to go on the run from the police. Satoru soon comes across Airi, who believes him to be innocent and lets him stay at her house, where he learns the details of Kayo's disappearance did change slightly because of his actions. The next day, as Satoru investigates as much as he can, Airi stops her manager from reporting Satoru to the police. Later that night, after helping Satoru hide elsewhere, Airi receives a text from Sachiko's phone before becoming trapped in a house fire.
6	"Grim Reaper"; Transliteration: "Shinigami" (Japanese: 死神)	Daiki Mori	Taku Kishimoto	February 12, 2016	
Coming across the burning house, Satoru rushes in to rescue Airi, who slips her phone into his pocket before the manager takes over the rescue. Finding the message left on Airi's phone, Satoru calls a number that Sachiko had left behind, arranging a meeting with a journalist acquaintance of hers named Sawada. Sawada tells Satoru about the last phone call he received from Sachiko, in which she claimed to know who the true kidnapper was but was unable to tell him before she was killed. He also explains the reported details surrounding Kayo's death, noticing Yuuki's framing matches with another kidnapping incident in a nearby town and deducing the true kidnapper was the one who killed Sachiko. While Satoru looks up Sawada's findings on the kidnapping incident, including a list of previous suspects, Sawada goes to the hospital to meet with Airi, only to discover that her mother has swapped places with her so she can prove Satoru's innocence. Airi meets with Satoru, informing him of a mysterious man named Nishizono who may have been responsible for the fire, but the police arrive and arrest Satoru. As he is taken away, Satoru spots the man he saw leaving his apartment on the night of his own mother's murder.
7	"Out of Control"; Transliteration: "Bōsō" (Japanese: 暴走)	Toshimasa Ishii	Yutaka Yasunaga	February 19, 2016	
Determined not to let things end the way it is, Satoru successfully triggers his Revival through sheer willpower, returning him to February 28, 1988. During school the next day, Kenya confronts Satoru about Kayo's situation at home, admitting that he has known for a while now about the domestic violence, and offers his assistance. Following the birthday party on March 2, Satoru throws a rock through Yuuki's window to bring about the police, providing Yuuki with an alibi for his whereabouts. Afterward, Satoru seeks out Akemi and comes close to pushing her down some stairs, but is stopped by Kenya, who convinces him to choose a different course of action. Instead, Satoru decides to "abduct" Kayo with her permission, taking her to an abandoned bus to hide out for a few days until she is confirmed to be safe. On the night of March 3, however, an unknown intruder enters the bus while Kayo is sleeping.
8	"Spiral"; Transliteration: "Rasen" (Japanese: 螺旋)	Kosaya	Yutaka Yasunaga	February 26, 2016	
Kayo manages to hide from the intruder who exits the bus, leaving behind a footprint on a box he kicked. The next evening, as Yashiro goes with some people from the Child Consultation Center to investigate Kayo's house, Kayo tells Satoru and the others about the previous night's intruder. Looking into a rucksack that was left behind, they find tools that Satoru recognizes as the ones used to implicate Yuuki for Kayo's murder, as well as a briquette presumed to belong to the killer. Realizing he is still stuck in the loop of abduction murders, Satoru takes Kayo to spend the night at his house, where Sachiko had been expecting them. The next day, Kayo has her first home-cooked breakfast in her life, leading her to start crying. Satoru and Sachiko later accompany Kayo back to her house to confront Akemi.
9	"Closure"; Transliteration: "Shūmaku" (Japanese: 終幕)	Tomohiko Itō	Taku Kishimoto	March 4, 2016	
As Akemi reacts violently to the accusations of Satoru and Sachiko, she is caught red-handed by Yashiro and the consultants, who suggest that Kayo be taken into custody. Just as Akemi prepares to storm off to the police, she is approached by her estranged mother, who regrets not being able to support her after having her divorce her abusive husband and raise Kayo on her own, leading Akemi to lament her own actions. With Kayo going off to live with her maternal grandmother, Satoru turns his attention towards the other two potential victims; Hiromi Sugita, his classmate, and Aya Nakanishi, a student from the neighboring school. While keeping a watch on both Hiromi and Aya, Satoru discovers a stash of candy in Yashiro's car when being given a ride home by him. Later, Satoru goes with Kenya and Hiromi to inspect the bus, the contents of which have now been removed.
10	"Joy"; Transliteration: "Kanki" (Japanese: 歓喜)	Takahiro Shikama	Taku Kishimoto	March 11, 2016	
Satoru and his friends approach Aya, and despite some initial resistance, she starts joining them at their hideout. Later, Satoru shadows Misato Yanagihara, who has kept to herself since being accused of framing Kayo. She seemingly disappears after going to the bathroom. Satoru then notices a truck belonging to Yuuki's family leaving the scene and he asks Yashiro to follow it in his car. Along the way, Yashiro reveals himself to be the killer and that he realized that Satoru was the one thwarting his plans. He explains that he used Misato as bait to lure Satoru into the stolen car, which he then rolls into a frozen lake with Satoru trapped inside.
11	"Future"; Transliteration: "Mirai" (Japanese: 未来)	Makoto Hoshino	Taku Kishimoto	March 18, 2016	
Following Yashiro's attempt to kill him, Satoru wakes up in the year 2003 after spending fifteen years in a coma. His body continued to grow and his mother cared for him daily. However, he has lost his memories of past events. Satoru is visited by Kenya and Hiromi, as well as Kayo, who has become Hiromi's wife and mother to their infant son who is given the feminine name Mirai ("future"). Some of Satoru's memories begin to return due to his friends' visits. Later, he meets a leukemia patient named Kumi, who is about to undergo surgery, as well as Yashiro himself, who changed his name to Nishizono and became a politician. Two days before Kumi's surgery, Yashiro takes Satoru to the hospital's rooftop, where he confirms Yashiro's suspicions that he has regained his memories.
12	"Treasure"; Transliteration: "Takaramono" (Japanese: 宝物)	Toshimasa Ishii	Taku Kishimoto	March 25, 2016	
A flashback shows that Satoru's memories returned after the visit from Kayo, and he told Kenya and Hiromi that Yashiro was the killer. Back on the rooftop, Yashiro boasts that his past crimes have already passed the statute of limitations and he cannot be arrested. He reveals he has arranged to kill Kumi with a sabotaged IV drip and to frame Satoru for her murder. Yashiro threatens to throw Satoru from the roof and make it look like a suicide. However, Satoru calls Yashiro's bluff, stating that Yashiro can't live without him. This seems true when Yashiro initially stops Satoru from rolling his wheelchair off the roof. However, Yashiro lets Satoru drop and prepares to commit suicide himself. He then discovers that Satoru has been safely caught by his friends, and Yashiro is finally arrested for attempted murder. Seven years later, in 2010, Satoru has become a successful manga artist. One day, Satoru surprisingly encounters Airi under the same bridge where they used to sit earlier, and where he had disappeared during his last Revival trip into the past, which has now reactivated itself.

=== Live-action adaptations ===
==== Film ====
A live-action film adaptation of Erased featuring Tatsuya Fujiwara as Satoru Fujinuma debuted in cinemas throughout Japan on March 19, 2016. The theme song is "Hear ~Shinjiaeta Akashi~" (Hear 〜信じあえた証〜, lit. Hear ~A proof that you could trust~) by Chise Kanna.

==== Drama series ====
In March 2017, Netflix announced a live-action adaptation of the manga series, co-created with Kansai TV. The Netflix Original series was released worldwide on December 15, 2017. Unlike the anime and live-action film, the live-action web drama covers the manga fully and does not deviate from the source material. The drama stars Yuki Furukawa as 29-year-old Satoru Fujinuma, Reo Uchikawa as Satoru as a child, and Mio Yūki as Airi.

=== Novel ===
A spin-off novel titled Boku Dake ga Inai Machi: Another Record, written by Hajime Ninomae, was serialized in Kadokawa's monthly digital novel magazine Bungei Kadokawa from November 2015 to March 2016. A volume collecting the chapters was released on March 30, 2016.

== Reception ==
Volume 4 reached the twelfth place on the weekly Oricon manga chart, and, by June 15, 2014, has sold 73,983 copies.

The manga was ranked sixteenth in the 2014 Kono Manga ga Sugoi! Top 20 Manga for Male Readers survey. It was nominated for the 18th Tezuka Osamu Cultural Prize Reader Award. It was also nominated at the 7th Manga Taishō, receiving 82 points and placing second among the ten nominees. It is nominated at the 8th Manga Taishō.

The staff at manga-news.com gave the French edition a grade of 17.33 out of 20. On Manga Sanctuary one of the staff members gave it an 8 out of 10.

== See also ==
- A Distant Neighborhood, a 1990s Japanese manga about an adult re-living his teenage life
