= Kamiyadori =

Japanese manga series

- First English edition of Kamiyadori, published by Tokyopop on December 26, 2008

カミヤドリ
- Manga
- Written by: Kei Sanbe
- Published by: Kadokawa Shoten
- English publisher: NA: Tokyopop
- Magazine: Shōnen Ace
- Original run: 2003 – 2006
- Volumes: 5
- Manga

Kamiyadori no Nagi
- Written by: Kei Sanbe
- Published by: Kadokawa Shoten
- Magazine: Ace Assault (previous), Shōnen Ace
- Original run: November 14, 2007 – September 25, 2010
- Volumes: 3

Kamiyadori (カミヤドリ) is a Japanese manga series written and illustrated by Kei Sanbe. It was serialised in Kadokawa Shoten's Shōnen Ace. The manga is licensed in North America by Tokyopop, in France by Kurokawa, in Spain by Planeta DeAgostini Comics, in Italy by Play Press and in Germany by Carlsen Verlag.

The sequel, Kamiyadori no Nagi (神宿りのナギ), was also written and illustrated by Kei Sanbe and published by Kadokawa Shoten.

== Plot ==
Set in a dystopian future, the world has been ravaged by a biological disease that transforms humans into monsters called the Kamiyadori. The Right Arms is a military peacekeeping group whose members have been infected with a strain of the virus, granting them superhuman strength. To prevent the spread of the virulent disease, all the people that are infected by the disease have to be executed. When Right Arms agents, Jil and Vivi, cannot kill a young boy and his sister, hope is created in the dystopian world.

== Characters ==
- Vivi is the co-protagonist of the series and is a Right Arms agent. She is gifted with the ability to mimic any movements. Because of this, she often repeats what other people say and is nicknamed "Gadget" by her colleagues. She often refuses to wear clothes. She is merciless and emotionless when it comes to killing Kamiyadoris. She possesses no common sense. She is orphan from ethnic Rojact who was adopted by Jil. Ethnic Rojact lost their homeland to Kamiyadori more than a hundred years before the story starts.
- Jillald (aka. Jil) is the co-protagonist of the series and is a Right Arms agent. He constantly tries to keep some clothes on Vivi. He refuses to use his right arm when he is killing Kamiyadori. He is nicknamed "Mad Righty" because of his ruthless killings of the Kamiyadori in the past. Jil, Caros, and Alisa were childhood friends and grew up in slum.
- Caros (or Carlos) is Jillald's partner whom together were of said to have killed far over sixty infected. He is nicknamed "Mad Dog" for his in discrimination towards all infected. He often quotes songs and lullabies during his killings of infected (i.e. Enter Sandman). Jil, Caros, and Alisa were childhood friends and grew up in slum.
- Alisa is the field commander of the Public Safety Headquarters. Jil, Caros, and Alisa were childhood friends and grew up in slum.
- Rady is a public safety officer. He was forced to work with Vivi when one of their buildings were overrun with terrorists. Vivi criticises his skill by saying "disqualified". When he is infected with the virus by a Kamiyadori, Vivi kills him.
- Gato is a heavy-set Right Arms agent who hates to appear weak in front of Jillaid.
- Kismee is a Right Arm martial arts instructor. She was raised up by prostitutes. She is very energetic and talkative. She is nicknamed "Scratch" for the scar across her neck, living as if it were "just a scratch" although it reveals a dark past. She chooses Clevort who was sentenced for death as her partner. Her chosen weapon is a set of metal laws.
- Anita (aka. Talker) is a girl has the ability to communicate with The Searcher, who see what happens to the Right Arms agents during their missions. She uses this ability to report to Alisa about what happens to her agents.
- Redona is a ruthless Right Arms Agent.
- Clevort was a former army captain before he indiscriminately murdered 60 civilians before he fully cooperated with the public safety officers with his arrest. He was sentenced to death at his trial. The Public Safety Commission intervened and Kismee took him in as her partner. His preferred weapon in the series is a shotgun.

== Manga ==
Kamiyadori is written and illustrated by Kei Sanbe. It was serialised in Kadokawa Shoten's Shōnen Ace. Kadokawa Shoten released the 5 bound volumes of the manga between March 1, 2004, and March 25, 2006. The manga is licensed in North America by Tokyopop, which released the 5 tankōbon of the manga between December 12, 2006, and March 11, 2008. It is also licensed in France by Kurokawa, in Spain by Planeta DeAgostini Comics, in Italy by Play Press and in Germany by Carlsen Verlag.

Kadokawa Shoten released the first tankōbon volume of the manga's sequel, Kamiyadori no Nagi (神宿りのナギ) on December 26, 2008. Kamiyadori no Nagi was serialized in Kadokawa Shoten's Ace Assault before being transferred to Shōnen Ace in March 2009 when the Ace Assault ended in Japan.

=== Volume listing ===
No.	Original release date	Original ISBN	English release date	English ISBN
1	March 1, 2004	978-4-04-713607-6	December 12, 2006	978-1-59816-633-0
01. "No Mercy" (容赦, "Yōsha"); 02. "Nostrum" (妙案, "Myōan"); 03. "Noxious" (有毒, "Yūdoku"); 04. "Novice" (初心者, "Shoshinsha"); 05. "Notion" (概念, "Gainen")
2	August 1, 2004	978-4-04-713652-6	April 10, 2007	978-1-59816-634-7
06. "Noose" (絞首刑, "Kōshukei"); 07. "Nostalgia" (郷愁, "Kyōshū"); 08. "No Go" (いいえ行く, "Iie Iku"); 09. "Nought" (ゼロ, "Zero"); 10. "Nonage" (発達初期, "Hattatsu Shoki"); Inner Part. 1
3	January 26, 2005	978-4-04-713700-4	August 7, 2007	978-1-59816-635-4
11. "Node" (ノード, "Nōdo"); 12. "Nobody" (誰も, "Daremo"); 13. "Nosy" (せんさく好きな, "Sensaku Suki Na"); 14. "Nob" (ノブ, "Nobu"); 15. "Noumenon" (本体, "Hontai"); 16. "Now" (今は, "Ima wa"); 17. "Who Killed Athna?"
4	August 26, 2005	978-4-04-713744-8	December 11, 2007	978-1-59816-636-1
18. "Who killed the parents?"; 19. "Who killed Maddocks?"; 20. "Who killed his mind?"; 21. "Who killed Elysion?"; 22. "Who killed Naty?"; 23. "Who killed Benitia?"; Inner Part. 2
5	March 25, 2006	978-4-04-713804-9	March 11, 2008	978-1-4278-0217-0
24. "Who killed Aja?"; 25. "Who killed Caros?"; 26. "Who killed the bird?"; 27. "Who killed the kingdom of Rodgek?"; 28. "Who killed Tiju?"; 29. "No Way Back..."

== Reception ==
IGN's A.E. Sparrow criticises the artwork of the manga and "too many nude or semi-nude scenes" of the protagonist. Mania.com's Jarred Pine criticises the manga on its use of "scantily clad women" and "bad ass men with even badder weapons". Jason Thompson's appendix to Manga: The Complete Guide compares the manga artist's earlier work Testarotho with the manga with "Sanbe focuses less on the monsters than on human-human violence and dark moral issues. (On the other hand, there's only so many times you can do the "please shoot me before I turn into a monster" routine)". He also commends "a whole cast of shady, above-the-law characters, distinctively depicted with Sanbe's excellent figure artwork." However, he criticises the "third-world setting" being drawn in "too much detail" as well as lack of plot movement.

ActiveAnime's Scott Campbell commends the manga by saying, "the art is dark and grungy like the world being depicted, but can just as quickly become quirky and funny as the story offers a bit of humour here and there." Campbell further praises the "potential for movement" and animation with "speedlines [and] explosions." He commends the extra at the end of the third volume, where the artist relates to his trip to Nepal, stating "it's fun to see the artist break out from the expectations of the manga they are drawing and just draw in a less serious way." Scott praises the identifiable characters with "everyone looks fairly different and it's easy to recognize who is who due to how much actual detail has been put into each of them."
