= Island in a Puddle =

Japanese manga series

- First volume cover

水溜まりに浮かぶ島 (Mizutamari ni Ukabu Shima)
- Genre: Suspense
- Manga
- Written by: Kei Sanbe
- Published by: Kodansha
- English publisher: NA: Kodansha USA
- Imprint: Evening KC
- Magazine: Evening
- Original run: November 26, 2019 – September 28, 2021
- Volumes: 5
- icon

Island in a Puddle (Japanese: 水溜まりに浮かぶ島, Hepburn: Mizutamari ni Ukabu Shima) is a Japanese manga series written and illustrated by Kei Sanbe. It was serialized in Kodansha's seinen manga magazine Evening from November 2019 to September 2021. The story is about a boy who switches bodies with a wanted criminal.

== Plot ==
Minato Myojin, a fifth grader, takes care of his younger sister Nagisa, subsisting off the cash their single mother gives them when she sporadically comes home, while also being helped by Futaba, a high school girl. Tomohiro Takita, alias Kuromatsu, a professional criminal, committed a heist with three others—Nakabuchi, Nozaki, and Mutsuki—orchestrated by Tsubaki, and is wanted by the police and the Dōdōkai, a gang. On Nagisa's birthday, the children's mother takes them to an amusement park. While Minato and Nagisa ride a ferris wheel, it is struck by lightning, and Minato switches bodies with Kuromatsu, who has wrung Mutsuki's neck in another car.

Minato has to figure out how to get his body back while protecting Nagisa and evading Kuromatsu's pursuers.

== Publication ==
Written and illustrated by Kei Sanbe, Island in a Puddle was serialized in Kodansha's seinen manga magazine Evening from November 26, 2019. to September 28, 2021. Kodansha collected its chapters in five tankōbon volumes, released from March 23, 2020, to November 22, 2021.

In June 2021, Kodansha USA announced the English release of the manga in North America, starting in 2022.

=== Volumes ===
No.	Original release date	Original ISBN	English release date	English ISBN
1	March 23, 2020	978-4-06-518858-3	March 15, 2022	978-1-64-651451-9
2	October 23, 2020	978-4-06-520849-6	July 12, 2022	978-1-64-651457-1
3	March 23, 2021	978-4-06-522600-1	August 23, 2022	978-1-64-651458-8
4	July 21, 2021	978-4-06-524046-5	October 11, 2022	978-1-64-651462-5
5	November 22, 2021	978-4-06-525888-0	February 14, 2023	978-1-64-651753-4
