= For the Kid I Saw in My Dreams =

Japanese manga series

- First tankōbon volume cover

夢で見たあの子のために (Yume de Mita Ano Ko no Tame ni)
- Genre: Mystery, thriller
- Manga
- Written by: Kei Sanbe
- Published by: Kadokawa Shoten
- English publisher: NA: Yen Press
- Imprint: Kadokawa Comics A
- Magazine: Young Ace
- Original run: July 4, 2017 – July 4, 2022
- Volumes: 11
- Television drama
- Directed by: Tsuyoshi Nakakuki
- Written by: Daisuke Hosaka
- Music by: Tarō Makido
- Licensed by: Lemino
- Original run: August 29, 2023 – October 31, 2023
- Episodes: 10
- icon

For the Kid I Saw in My Dreams (Japanese: 夢で見たあの子のために, Hepburn: Yume de Mita Ano Ko no Tame ni) is a Japanese manga series written and illustrated by Kei Sanbe. It was serialized in Kadokawa Shoten's seinen manga magazine Young Ace from July 2017 to July 2022, with its chapters collected in eleven tankōbon volumes. A drama adaptation aired from August to October 2023.

== Media ==
=== Manga ===
Written and illustrated by Kei Sanbe, For the Kid I Saw in My Dreams was serialized in Kadokawa Shoten's seinen manga magazine Young Ace from July 4, 2017, to July 4, 2022. Kadokawa Shoten collected its chapters in eleven tankōbon volumes, released from December 4, 2017, to September 2, 2022.

In North America, the manga was licensed for English release by Yen Press. The eleven volumes were released from January 22, 2019, to October 17, 2023.

==== Volumes ====
| No. | Original release date | Original ISBN | English release date | English ISBN |
|---|---|---|---|---|
| 1 | December 4, 2017 | 978-4-04-106312-5 | January 22, 2019 | 978-1-9753-2886-3 |
| 2 | May 2, 2018 | 978-4-04-106837-3 | June 18, 2019 | 978-1-9753-0353-2 |
| 3 | December 4, 2018 | 978-4-04-107481-7 | November 26, 2019 | 978-1-9753-5950-8 |
| 4 | June 4, 2019 | 978-4-04-108238-6 | April 2, 2020 | 978-1-9753-9942-9 |
| 5 | December 4, 2019 | 978-4-04-108239-3 | July 21, 2020 | 978-1-9753-1534-4 |
| 6 | August 4, 2020 | 978-4-04-109456-3 | June 8, 2021 | 978-1-9753-2400-1 |
| 7 | December 28, 2020 | 978-4-04-109457-0 | December 7, 2021 | 978-1-9753-3679-0 |
| 8 | July 2, 2021 | 978-4-04-111458-2 | July 26, 2022 | 978-1-9753-4491-7 |
| 9 | December 3, 2021 | 978-4-04-111459-9 | December 13, 2022 | 978-1-9753-4954-7 |
| 10 | June 3, 2022 | 978-4-04-112549-6 | May 23, 2023 | 978-1-9753-6477-9 |
| 11 | September 2, 2022 | 978-4-04-113051-3 | October 17, 2023 | 978-1-9753-6816-6 |

=== Drama ===
A ten-episode drama adaptation premiered on the Lemino streaming platform from August 29 to October 31, 2023.
