= Ā, Domo. Ohisashiburi Desu. =

Ā, Domo. Ohisashiburi Desu

Studio album by GReeeeN
- Released: June 25, 2008
- Genre: Pop rock
- Label: Nayutawave Records

GReeeeN chronology
A, Domo. Hajimemashite (2007)	Ā, Domo. Ohisashiburi Desu (2008)	Shio, Koshō (2009)

Professional ratings
Review scores
Source	Rating
Allmusic	link

A, Domo. Ohisashiburi Desu. (Japanese: あっ、ども。おひさしぶりです。, "Oh, Hi. Long Time No See.") is the second studio album by Japanese band GReeeeN. It was released on June 25, 2008, and is certified by RIAJ for shipment of 1 million copies.

== Track listing ==
Source: Oricon

1. SUN SHINE!!
2. Mata ne. (またね。)
3. Kiseki
4. Kimi Omoi (君想い)
5. Hito (人)
6. Sayonara Kara Hajimeyou (サヨナラから始めよう)
7. Chikyuu-gou (地球号)
8. Tabidachi (旅立ち)
9. no more war
10. BE FREE
11. Boyonka Boyoyonka ~Yukai na Otona-tachi~ feat. 2BACKKA & UNITEBUS
12. Namidazora (涙空))
13. Yozora no Kiseki ~Orgel version~ (夜空のキセキ)

== Covers ==
"Kiseki" was covered by Andrew W.K., Kazunari Ninomiya, C.J. Lewis, Shigeru Matsuzaki and Choi Min-ho. A cover performed by Rie Takahashi was used as an ending theme for the anime Teasing Master Takagi-san 2. Fujin Rizing!, a fictional ska band from multimedia franchise Argonavis from BanG Dream! was also covered the song and added in the game started on January 14, 2021.

== Charts (Japan) ==
Release	Chart	Peak position	Debut sales (copies)	Sales total (copies)
June 25, 2008	Oricon Daily Charts	1		901,060
June 25, 2008	Oricon Weekly Charts	1	377,070	901,060
June 25, 2008	Oricon Monthly Charts	1		901,060
June 25, 2008	Yearly Charts (2008)	10	778,578	901,060
June 25, 2008	Yearly Charts (2009)	62	123,425	901,060

- Sales in 2008: 778,578
- Sales in 2009: 122,482
