= Utautai ga Uta Utai ni Kite Uta Utae to Iu ga Utautai ga Uta Utau dake Utaikire ba Uta Utau keredomo Utautai dake Uta Utaikirenai kara Uta Utawanu!? =

Studio album by Greeeen
- Released: June 27, 2012

Greeeen chronology
AB Dest!? Tour!? 2010 Supported by Hudson x Greeeen Live!? Deeees!? (2010)	Utautai ga Uta Utai ni Kite Uta Utae to Iu ga Utautai ga Uta Utau dake Utaikire ba Uta Utau keredomo Utautai dake Uta Utaikirenai kara Uta Utawanu!? (2012)	Imakara Oyayubi ga Kieru Tejina Shimasu. (2014)

Utautai ga Uta Utai ni Kite Uta Utae to Iu ga Utautai ga Uta Utau dake Utaikire ba Uta Utau keredomo Utautai dake Uta Utaikirenai kara Uta Utawanu!? (歌うたいが歌うたいに来て 歌うたえと言うが 歌うたいが歌うたうだけうたい切れば 歌うたうけれども 歌うたいだけ 歌うたい切れないから 歌うたわぬ！？) is Japanese band Greeeen's fourth studio album, which was released on June 27, 2012. It reached the 2nd place on the Oricon Weekly Albums Chart.

The title is a tongue twister in Japanese, and roughly translates to "a singer asks me to sing a song; if I could sing a song like a singer sings a song, I would sing a song like a singer sings a song, but I cannot sing a song like a singer sings a song, so I will not sing a song."

== Track listing ==
1. Uta Utawanu!? ~Ieru Kana~ (歌うたわぬ！？～言えるかな～)
2. weeeek
3. Saorashido (ソラシド)
4. Love Letter (.恋文～ラブレター～)
5. Green boys
6. Hana Uta (花唄)
7. Orange (オレンジ)
8. pride
9. Midori No Takeda (緑のたけだ)
10. GOOD LUCKY!!!!!
11. Misenai Namida Ha, Kitto Itsuka (ミセナイナミダハ、きっといつか)
12. every
13. Wai Ha WaiWai De Iiwai ~Omae Wai?~ (ワイはワイワイでいいワイ～おまえワィ？～)
14. Oh!!!! Meiwaku!!!! (OH!!!! 迷惑!!!!)
15. Tomodachi No Uta (友達の唄)
