= Icarus (Greeeen song) =

Single by Greeeen
- Released: April 17, 2013
- Recorded: 2013
- Genre: J-Pop
- Label: Nayutawave Records
- Songwriter: Greeeen
- Producer: Jin

Greeeen singles chronology
"Sakura Color" (2013)	"Icarus" (2013)

Music video
- "Icarus" on YouTube

"Icarus" (イカロス, Ikarosu) is the 20th single by Japanese pop rock/hip hop/breakbeat vocal group Greeeen, released on April 17, 2013. The song is released in three versions, and is used as the image song for the Calpis Soda TV commercials in Japan.

== Summary ==
"Icarus" is the third Greeeen song to be used in a Japanese TV commercial, the first two being "Yuki no Oto" and "Sakura Color". It is also the first time that the group collaborated with the Calpis company to actually perform the song in the commercial. The single comes in three versions, a regular CD version, a CD+DVD version which includes a video of the song, and a digital download released on iTunes.

The song is named after Icarus, the son of the master craftsman Daedalus in Greek Mythology.

== Promotional video ==
The promotional video of the song is produced by Jin, and stars Kyoko Yoshine, Miohana Nishihata, Ruka Uchida, and Ryōhei Tominaga.

== Track listing ==
All music is composed by Greeeen.

No.	Title	Length
1.	"Icarus" (イカロス)
2.	"Ama uta" (雨唄)
