= Shio, Koshō =

Studio album by Greeeen
- Released: June 10, 2009
- Recorded: 2008–2009
- Genre: Pop rock
- Length: 57:02 (Standard Edition & Limited Edition A); 61:36 (Limited Edition B)
- Label: Nayutawave
- Producer: Jin

Greeeen chronology
A, Domo. Ohisashiburi Desu. (2008)	Shio, Koshō (2009)	Ima Made no A Men, B Men Dest!? (2009)

Shio, Koshō (塩、コショウ, "Salt & Pepper") is Japanese band Greeeen's third studio album released on June 10, 2009. There is a limited edition having DVD. There is another limited edition having bonus track "Kiseki".

With the sales of over 101,000 copies in the first day, the album debuted at number-one position on the Oricon daily album charts. The album debuted at the number-one position on the Oricon weekly album charts, selling over 452,000 copies in its first week. It became their 2nd album to be awarded Million status by RIAJ.

The album has a hidden track, which was untitled when the album released. The song was later named "Hige, Kosō" (髭、コソウ).

== Track listing ==
All tracks are written by Greeeen.

No.	Title	Length
1.	"Hikari (光)"	3:35
2.	"Kuchibue (口笛)"	3:40
3.	"Haruka (遥か)"	5:37
4.	"Ayumi (歩み)"	4:12
5.	"Itsumademo (いつまでも)"	4:03
6.	"Tabibito (旅人)"	3:33
7.	"Hallelujah!!!! (ハレルヤ！！！！)"	3:33
8.	"Story"	3:53
9.	"Setsuna (刹那)"	4:46
10.	"Fuyu no Aruhi no Uta (冬のある日の唄)"	4:23
11.	"Tobira (扉)"	4:14
12.	"Sora e no Tegami (空への手紙)"	3:57
13.	"Fubo Uta (父母唄)"	5:04
14.	"Hige, Kosō (髭、コソウ) (hidden track)"	2:22

Limited edition A: bonus DVD
No.	Title	Length
1.	"Tobira (扉)"
2.	"Ayumi (歩み)"
3.	"Setsuna (刹那)"
4.	"Haruka (遥か)"

Limited edition B: bonus track
No.	Title	Length
14.	"Kiseki (bonus track)"	4:31
15.	"Hige, Kosō (髭、コソウ) (hidden track)"	2:22

== Charts ==
Release	Oricon Albums Chart	Peak position	Debut sales (copies)	Sales total (copies)
June 10, 2009	Daily Charts	1	101,976	1,005,874
June 10, 2009	Weekly Charts	1	452,258	1,005,874
June 10, 2009	Monthly Charts (June 2009)	1	625,507	1,005,874
June 10, 2009	Monthly Charts (July 2009)	3	245,877	1,005,874
June 10, 2009	Monthly Charts (August 2009)	8	85,671	1,005,874
June 10, 2009	Yearly Charts (2009)	3	2009 Sales : 1,000,127	1,005,874

Preceded by Best Fiction (Namie Amuro)	Japan Record Award for the Best Album; 2009	Succeeded by Hajimari no Uta (Ikimonogakari)
