= Hōzuki Island =

Manga series written and illustrated by Kei Sanbe

- Vol. 2 of Hōzuki Island as published by Square Enix

鬼燈の島 (Hōzuki no shima)
- Manga
- Written by: Kei Sanbe
- Published by: Square Enix
- Magazine: Young Gangan
- Original run: December 21, 2007 – July 3, 2009
- Volumes: 4

Hōzuki Island (鬼燈の島, Hōzuki no Shima) is a manga written and illustrated by Kei Sanbe. It was serialized in Square Enix bi-monthly seinen magazine Young Gangan from December 2007 to July 2009. The narrative unfolds on a nearly deserted island in Japan where six orphaned or abandoned school children live alone with their four adult teachers in the ruin of an old school.

== Summary ==
The central narrative of the Manga revolves around two primary characters, Kokoro and Yume, who become the focus of the story. After being left behind by their parents, the siblings are sent to a remote island. Their path leads them to an island school, where they encounter four instructors and four other youngsters who, like them, have been abandoned or orphaned, forming the island's sole inhabitants. The island's proprietor is also part of this small community.

The central narrative gains momentum as the main characters are drawn into rumors and a concealed secret room. Growing suspicions encourage the children to question the intentions of the adults around them, suspecting hidden truths. As the story progresses, they embark on a daring quest to unveil the mystery, facing challenges and risking their lives.

== Characters ==
Kokoro Suzuhara (鈴原心, Suzuhara Kokoro)
Kokoro is a 10-year-old boy who was abandoned by his parents. His parents have entrusted his younger sister Yume to his care. Along with the other children, he tries to find out the secrets of the island.
Yume Suzuhara (鈴原夢, Suzuhara Yume)
Kokoro's 5-year-old sister. She is blind and depends on her brother most of the time. As a result of being blind, Yume has a keenly developed sense of hearing, hinted at when she hears the voice of an unseen girl that the other children can't hear. She is also talented and intelligent, having the ability to identify people through their footsteps. A character with the same name, apparent blindness, and even an older brother who seemingly resembles Kokoro appears in another of Sanbe's series, Cradle of Monsters; this character may be in fact the same Yume.
Shuichiro Fujii (藤井秀一郎, Fujii Shūichirō)
Shuichiro, known as "Shu" for short, is a 10-year-old boy with an IQ of 150. He was raised by a single mother, an insurance saleswoman who was driven into neurotic behavior from poverty and tried to commit a double suicide with Shuichiro by driving a car off a cliff. Shuichiro, having survived, came to see adults as enemies as a result. With his high intelligence and knowledge of his mother's past career, he is mature and hypothesized that the teachers are killing students for insurance money. He became the leader of the students when Rikiya was injured and removed from school, and under the belief that Rikiya was murdered, decided to lead the remaining students to escape.
Hatsune Miyazawa (宮沢初音, Miyazawa Hatsune)
Hatsune is an 11-year-old girl. She is mute due to her gambling addict parents beating her for singing after an anime song, and did not dare to speak again ever since; her parents eventually abandon her to escape their debtors. She loves music, and plays a recorder despite not speaking any further. She also became frightened and traumatized of Kuwadate when he nearly raped her. She regained her ability to speak after meeting Kokoro, warning him about Kuwadate attacking him.
Futoshi Hakkai (八海太, Hakkai Futoshi)
Futoshi is a 10-year-old boy with a heavy eating disorder. Ever since his parents died, he lived with his grandmother, and he keeps eating as a way to escape reality, thus leading him to be obese. Futoshi's obsession with food led him to cry out when it is taken away from him, but he overcame his disorder partially when the headmaster was closing in on him and Yume; he chose to save Yume over the food in his backpack.
Rikiya Sudo (須藤力也, Sudō Rikiya)
Referred as the "King of Brats", he was somewhat the leader of the students on the island. He started to tell lies after his parents were sentenced to prison, but is a loyal friend. He wanted a supposedly existing gold mine found on the island to survive in the outer world once they escape from the island, but he was injured from a fall due to a slip from climbing. The others misinterpreted that the teachers murdered him for defying them until he later showed up with Hisanobu, discharged from the hospital.
Hisanobu Takahashi (高知久信, Takahashi Hisanobu)
Hisanobu, "Nobu" for short, is Rikiya's right-hand man, and is considered to be an expert at hide-and-seek. He suffered stress-induced illness, and was vomiting blood into a drawer to keep people from finding out. He also kept a pocket knife to defend himself from teachers. Sometime before the Suzuhara siblings' arrival, Kuwadate saw him vomiting blood in the bathroom, and took him to the hospital. Futoshi misinterpreted the scene as Kuwadate killing Nobu for trying to find out evidence about the school's darker activities, until he later showed up with Rikiya, discharged from the hospital.
Yukino Kai (甲斐雪乃, Kai Yukino)
Yukino is the newest teacher on Hōzuki Island school, being in charge of health and physical education. She is a 2-dan in kendo. She was neglected by her parents, and due to her friend Mai being incarcerated for child abuse, Yukino herself decided to become a teacher to understand the relationship between children and adults. She wants to help the students in any way, but they were distrusting of her along with the other adults. She shows her true allegiance when she saved Kokoro from Kuwadate. After the island school was shut down, she became a teacher in Okinawa, still keeping in touch with Kokoro.
Kuwadate (桑館, Kuwadate)
Kuwadate is one of the four teachers on the island, and the main antagonist. He is perverted and cruel, trying to molest and rape Yukino and Hatsune, as well as threatening to murder any of the students under the pretense of an "accident". He also killed Usui for interfering with his advances on Yukino, and with all his crimes added up, he was ultimately sentenced to 13 years in prison.
Usui (臼井, Usui)
Usui is a large man, a teacher on the island, and a friend of Yukino. He warned Kuwadate to stop harassing Yukino, which led the former to kill him to prevent any further interferences. While Shuichiro loosened a ladder's bottom step so Usui would suffer a broken leg, Kuwadate flipped the ladder, so Usui suffered a higher fall, breaking his neck.
Toyoda (豊田, Toyoda)
Toyoda is the elderly headmaster of the school. He loved the school and wanted to educate the children to be prepared to leave for the outside world. However, due to a misunderstanding, it would appear that he was inciting the murder of children to gain insurance to keep the school running when money was running low. He was killed when a dog knocked him into a water container in the coal mine, causing him to hit his skull and drown in it.
Ghost (幽霊, Yūrei)
The ghost of a girl, who was a former student of the school, appeared in front of the students from time to time, giving them various pointers when they were in danger. She died of what the headmaster treated as an "accident", but before her death, she requested that her insurance would be used to keep the school running. Shuichiro came to believe that she was no more than an illusion caused by their own instincts, but Hatsune saw her one last time seven years after the tragedy was over.

== Manga ==
The series is written and illustrated by Kei Sanbe and serialized in Square Enix bi-monthly seinen magazine Young Gangan from December 21, 2007, to July 3, 2009, totalizing 27 chapters. The chapters were collected into four tankōbon, the first one released on May 22, 2008, and the fourth on September 25, 2009.

Outside Japan this series has been licensed by Ki-Oon in France.

No.	Release date	ISBN
1	May 22, 2008	978-4-7575-2285-5
Chapter 1: A Beautiful Island; Chapter 2: The Child that Disappeared; Chapter 3: The Forbidden Stairs; Chapter 4: Things that Cannot be Known; Chapter 5: Who was Being Targeted?; Chapter 6: The Misty Coast; Chapter 7: Why Do We Lie?
2	October 22, 2008	978-4-7575-2405-7
Chapter 8: Please Open the Door; Chapter 9: Won't Let You Escape; Chapter 10: Very Very Important Kids; Chapter 11: God Doesn't Exist; Extra: Criminal; Chapter 12: Everything Can Be Seen Clearly; Chapter 13: Want to Die in an Accident?; Chapter 14: Safe Place to Hide
3	May 22, 2009	978-4-7575-2569-6
Chapter 15: Which is More Important?; Chapter 16: Kill or be Killed; Chapter 17: Extra: Middle School Student Kuwadate; Chapter 18: Shu Can't Sleep; Chapter 19: Did You Kill Them!?; Chapter 20: The Adults Always Say
4	September 25, 2009	978-4-7575-2688-4
Chapter 21: Which One is the Liar?; Chapter 22: Just to Get You to Safety; Chapter 23: Chapter 24: Am I Dying? for what I've Done?; Extra: Middle School Student Yukino; Chapter 25: I Don't Want to be a Liar; Chapter 26: Misunderstanding; Chapter 27: The Memories of the Terror

== Reception ==
Animeland reviewed the first volume of the French edition as a well-made thriller, praising the mise-en-scène and the ambiance; the use of the children's points of view was viewed positively but the character of Kuwadate was described as disgusting.
