= Kei Sanbe =

Japanese manga artist

- 三部敬
- Born: March 5 Tomakomai, Japan
- Other name: Keisuke Kawara
- Occupation: Manga artist
- Years active: 1990–present
- Known for: Nanako-san Teki na Nichijō; Erased
- Spouse: Keishi Kanesada

Kei Sanbe (三部 敬, Sanbe Kei) is a Japanese manga artist born in Tomakomai, Hokkaido and raised in Chiba Prefecture. He has formerly worked under the pseudonym Keisuke Kawara (瓦 敬助, Kawara Keisuke). He is married to illustrator Keishi Kanesada (兼処 敬士, Kanesada Keishi).

Sanbe was an honorable mention in the 1990 40th Tezuka Award and a semi-final winner in the 41st iteration. His manga, Erased, was nominated for the 18th Tezuka Osamu Cultural Prize Reader Award.

== History ==
After graduating from high school, Sanbe moved to Tokyo to study background art production at the Tokyo Designer Gakuin College. He cites Lupin the Third's The Castle of Cagliostro as the driving force behind his enrollment and overall interest in drawing background art. He made his debut in the game magazine Dengeki Adventures. During his time in school, Sanbe came across a job listing in Weekly Shōnen Jump from Hirohiko Araki, requesting for new assistants. While not particularly a fan of the JoJo's Bizarre Adventure series, its variety of backgrounds and foreign settings enticed him to submit an application. After applying twice, Sanbe was accepted into Araki's team around the time of Battle Tendency's serialization and was eventually promoted to chief assistant. He would go on to work for Araki for a total of eight years before leaving halfway through Golden Wind to pursue his own career as a manga artist. When Testarotho, Kamiyadori, and Erased were published in tankōbon form, Araki gave his endorsement on the obi.

== Works ==
- Testarotho (2001–02)
- Kamiyadori (2004–06)
- Kamiyadori no Nagi (2008–2010)
- Hohzuki Island (2008–09)
- Mōryō no Yurikago (2010–12)
- Black Rod
- Hotaru
- Puzzle
- Nanako-san Teki na Nichijō
- Nanako-san Teki na Nichijō Re
- Nanako-san Teki na Nichijō Dash!!
- Erased (2012–16)
- Erased: Re (2016)
- For the Kid I Saw in My Dreams (2017–22)
- Island in a Puddle (2019–21)
- The 13th Footprint
- Reto the Protector
