= Tsubasa Nakagawa =

Japanese actor (born 2005)

- 中川 翼
- Born: Tsubasa Nakagawa; December 6, 2005 (age 20); Kanagawa Prefecture, Japan
- Occupation: Actor
- Years active: 2009–present

Tsubasa Nakagawa (中川 翼, Nakagawa Tsubasa; born December 6, 2005) is a Japanese actor.

== Career ==
He began his career at the age of four as a model for Mondrana Entertainment.

== Filmography ==
=== Film ===
Year	Title	Role	Notes	Ref.
2016	Erased	Satoru Fujinuma (10 years old)		
2017	Anonymous Noise	Momo Sakaki (childhood)		
2022	Whisper of the Heart	Seiji Amasawa (middle school)		

=== Television ===
Year	Title	Role	Notes	Ref.
2017	Idol × Warrior Miracle Tunes!	Ryō Kurihara		
2022	The 13 Lords of the Shogun	Hōjō Masanori		
2025	Strobe Edge	Manabu Miyoshi		
