= Testarotho =

Japanese manga series

- First tankōbon volume cover

テスタロト (Tesutaroto)
- Genre: Action, fantasy, historical fiction
- Manga
- Written by: Kei Sanbe
- Published by: Kadokawa Shoten
- English publisher: NA: CMX Manga
- Original run: August 2000 – November 2002
- Volumes: 4

Testarotho (テスタロト, Tesutaroto) is a Japanese manga series written and illustrated by Kei Sanbe. The manga is licensed in English by CMX Manga. The manga is licensed for a French-language release by Vegetal Soleil.

== Characters ==
- Garrincha is the feared inquisitor of Neo Arsen. He tries to convert heretics to the Arsenal religion.
- Leonedus is a loyal friend of Garrincha.
- Capria is a nun who joins the group.
- Socrates is the healer and doctor of the group.
- Sabati is an assassin who betrayed Arsenal to join Materia, a heretic sect. She attempts to assassinate Leonedus, her childhood friend.

== Manga ==
Kadokawa Shoten has released four tankōbon volumes of the manga between February 2001 and November 2002. CMX Manga released the four bound volumes of the manga between September 1, 2005, and May 1, 2006.

=== Volume listing ===
No.	Original release date	Original ISBN	English release date	English ISBN
1	February 27, 2001	978-4-04-926166-0	September 1, 2005	978-1-40-120742-7
2	May 30, 2001	978-4-04-926174-5	November 1, 2005	978-1-40-120743-4
3	March 25, 2002	978-4-04-926194-3	February 1, 2006	978-1-40-120744-1
4	November 28, 2002	978-4-04-926211-7	May 1, 2006	978-1-40-120745-8

== Reception ==
Mania.com's Jarred Pine criticises the manga on relying too much on " flashy violence rather than really exploring the conflicts of the heretic inquisitions."
