= Ā, Domo. Hajimemashite =

Studio album by GReeeeN
- Released: June 27, 2007
- Genre: Pop rock
- Label: Nayutawave

GReeeeN chronology
Ā, Domo. Hajimemashite (2007)	Ā, Domo. Ohisashiburi Desu. (2008)

Ā, Domo. Hajimemashite (Japanese: あっ、ども。はじめまして。; lit. 'Oh, Hi. Nice to meet you.')) is the first studio album by the Japanese band GReeeeN, released on June 27, 2007. It reached the 2nd place on the Oricon Weekly Albums Chart.

== Track listing ==
1. 道 (Michi)
2. Day by Day
3. 愛唄 (Ai Uta)
4. High G.K Low～ハジケロ～ (Hajikero)
5. New Life
6. 子犬 (Koinu)
7. Miss You
8. 手紙 (Tegami)
9. パリピポ (Paripipo)
10. レゲレゲ (Regerege)
11. ミドリ (Midori)
