= Ai Uta =

2007 single by Greeeen

- Cover of the single

Single by Greeeen

from the album Ā, Domo. Hajimemashite
- Language: Japanese
- Released: May 16, 2007
- Length: 3:58
- Label: Nayutawave Records
- Composer: Greeeen
- Producer: Jin

Greeeen singles chronology
"High G.K Low (Hajikero)" (2007)	"Ai Uta" (2007)	"Hito" (2007)

Music videos
- "Ai Uta" on YouTube

"Ai Uta" (愛唄; lit. 'Love Song') is a song by the Japanese band Greeeen (now Gre4n Boyz). It was released on May 16, 2007.

== Release and reception ==
"Ai Uta" was released on May 16, 2007, as the band's third single. The song was later included in the band's first album Ā, Domo. Hajimemashite. Greeeen's label, Nayutawave Records, specifically marketed the song towards junior and senior high school students in an attempt to appeal to them, as they estimated that 85% of Greeeen fans were high schoolers.

The song quickly rose to popularity, selling 250,000 copies. The chaku-uta version of the song was downloaded 2 million times in two months. "Ai Uta" later became the third best-selling multi-format single of 2007 in Japan with over 6.2 million combined sales. It ranked second on Recochoku's 2019 "Heisei Download Ranking", just behind "Kiseki", another one of the band's songs. The song surpassed 100 million streams on Billboard Japan in February 2024, making it the ninth song from the 2000s to do so. The song ranked as the ninth most played 2000s song on Spotify Japan in 2022. It peaked on Oricon's weekly chart in May 2007 at second.

At the 22nd Japan Gold Disc Awards, Greeeen won the category of New Artist of the Year for the song. The song was ranked as the third highest certified song by the Recording Industry Association of Japan, with 2.5 million downloads tracked between 2007 and 2009. In a survey conducted by Oricon in 2007 about "heart-throbbing love songs that are perfect for autumn and will liven up your romance", the song ranked first; the survey wrote that the song was "making girls' heart fluttered."

The song was used as the sixth ending theme covered by Rie Takahashi for the 2018 anime Teasing Master Takagi-san, and the second ending theme covered by Manaka Iwami for the 2023 anime The Angel Next Door Spoils Me Rotten. The song was also covered by Whiteeeen for the ending theme of the live-action adaptation of the manga Strobe Edge.

A live-action adaptation of the song entitled Ai Uta - Yakusoku no Nakuhito (愛唄 ー約束のナクヒトー) was announced in April 2018 and premiered on January 25, 2019, in Japan on Line Live, starring Ryusei Yokohama. It was directed by Taisuke Kawamura and the script was written by Greeeeen with Shimizu Tadashi. The film was distributed by Toei.

== Chart ==
Weekly chart performance for "Ai Uta"
Charts	Peak position
Japan CD Oricon	2
Japan Hot 100 (Billboard Japan)	48

== See also ==
- List of best-selling singles in Japan
- Kiseki (Greeeen song)
