= Mōryō no Yurikago =

Manga series by Kei Sanbe

- First volume cover

魍魎の揺りかご
- Manga
- Written by: Kei Sanbe
- Published by: Square Enix
- Magazine: Young Gangan
- Original run: April 16, 2010 – August 17, 2012
- Volumes: 6

Mōryō no Yurikago (魍魎の揺りかご, Mōryō no Yurikago; "Cradle of Monsters") is a Japanese manga series written and illustrated by Kei Sanbe. The series ran from 2010 to 2012 published by Square Enix and serialized in their Young Gangan magazine. The series has been published in French by Ki-oon under the title Le Berceau des Esprits.

The series focuses on a group of students trapped on a capsized sunken ship at the bottom of the ocean while they fight for survival against an isolated zombie outbreak and try to escape with their lives and sanity intact.

== Reception ==
The manga has a staff rating of 14.5 on the French manga website manga-news.com.
