= Gre4n Boyz =

Japanese band

GRe4N BOYZ
- Origin: Kōriyama, Fukushima, Japan
- Genres: Rock; pop rock; EDM; hip hop; J-pop
- Years active: 2002–present
- Labels: Nayutawave (2007–2014); Zen (2014–2023); Polydor (2023–)
- Members: HIDE navi 92; SOH
- Website: gre4n-boyz.com

GRe4N BOYZ (stylized as GRe4N BOYZ), until March 2024 named GReeeeN (stylized as GReeeeN), is a Japanese all-male vocal group from Kōriyama in Fukushima Prefecture, comprising the four members: HIDE, navi, 92 (read as "kuni"), and SOH.

They debuted with Universal Music Japan in 2007. Their previous logo depicts a mouthful of teeth, with the four "e" representing both the number of members and their dental background, as all of them graduated from the Faculty of Dentistry. Sound production is overseen by HIDE's older brother JIN, formerly a guitarist of Pay money To my Pain. Their official catchphrase, according to their Universal Music Japan website, is "Rock 'n' Breakbeat with four microphones." All members of GRe4N BOYZ attended the dentistry department at Ohu University in Koriyama City, Fukushima Prefecture. Notably, the group debuted while still students in 2007. By 2010, each member had obtained a dental license and commenced practicing dentistry in Kōriyama. In 2019 they were appointed as 'Frontier Ambassadors' for Kōriyama city, highlighting their significant contributions to the local community.

== History ==
=== 2002–2005: Formation and career beginnings ===
GReeeeN was formed in 2002 by HIDE and navi, together with HIDE’s elder brother JIN, initially as a trio under the name “greeen,” with three “e”s used in the group name. The group initially produced music while the members were studying dentistry.

In 2004, SOH and 92 joined the group, expanding it into a four-member unit and establishing the current lineup. Their addition was based on informal audition-style evaluations conducted by HIDE and navi, including performance checks held in karaoke settings. Further background on the group’s early history is also described in それってキセキ ～GReeeeNの物語～, a biographical work published by Futabasha.

=== 2006–2007: Debut and career breakthrough ===
After the group independently released their self-titled EP, Greeeen on February 14, 2006, Universal Music Japan recruited them in March 2006. They were signed under Nayutawave Records, a subsidiary label of Universal Music Japan. They debuted with the single "Michi" on January 24, 2007.

"Ai Uta" was released as their third single on May 16, 2007. It debuted and peaked at #2 on the Oricon Daily Singles Chart. It debuted at #8 on the Oricon Weekly Singles Chart and eventually peaked at #2 in its sixth week on the weekly chart. The song was certified Two Million by the Recording Industry Association of Japan (RIAJ) for 2,000,000 full-track ringtone digital downloads (Chaku-Uta Full).

Their debut album, A, Domo. Hajimemashite, was released on June 28, 2007. It debuted at #2 on the Oricon Weekly Albums Chart. The album was certified Triple Platinum by RIAJ for shipment of 750,000 copies.

=== 2008–2009: Rise of popularity ===
"Kiseki" was released as their seventh single on May 28, 2008, and was used as a theme song for the drama, Rookies. It topped the Oricon Weekly Singles Chart and sold over 500,000 copies. The song was also certified Two Million by the RIAJ for 2,000,000 full-track ringtone digital downloads (Chaku Uta Full). The song topped the Billboard Japan Hot 100 Year-End 2008 Chart. The song was certified Four Million by RIAJ for 4,000,000 single track downloads.

Their second album A, Domo. Ohisashiburi Desu. was released on June 25, 2008, and debuted at #1 on Oricon Weekly Albums Chart, beating out Ayaka's second album Sing to the Sky (2008). The album was certified Million by RIAJ for shipment of one million copies.

Greeeen and Back-On formed supergroup Bareeeeeeeeeen, which released single "Ashiato" on October 1, 2008.

On March 11, 2009, A monument "GReeeeN's Door" with a musical motif is installed in the station square of JR East Kōriyama Station.

Their follow-up singles "Tobira", "Ayumi", "Setsuna" and "Haruka" were certified Gold by RIAJ for shipments of 100,000 copies each. Their song "Haruka" debuted at the number-one position on the RIAJ Digital Track Chart. The song was certified Million by RIAJ for 1,000,000 full-track ringtone digital downloads (Chaku Uta Full).

Their third album Shio, Koshō was released on June 10, 2009, and debuted at #1 on the Oricon Weekly Albums Chart with the first-week sales of over 452,000 copies. It became their second album to be certified Million by RIAJ.

On June 29, 2009, the Guinness World Records certified their song "Kiseki" as the "best selling download single in Japan" with the full-track ringtone download sales of 2,301,674 copies of May 24, 2009.

Greeeen released their greatest hits double album Ima Made no A Men, B Men Dest!? on November 25, 2009. On November 5, 2009, an article of Nikkan Sports suggested that GReeeeN would disband after the release of the album. HIDE wrote on his blog that the rumours were false. On November 5, the official statement by Universal Music Japan also said that the report was false and that GReeeeN would still be releasing music after the release of the album Imamade no A Men, B Men Desuto!?.

It was announced that Greeeen would be teaming up with Hudson Soft to create music for 2009 DS game. Hudson x GReeeeN Live!? DeeeeS!? was released on April 1, 2010, as their collaboration effort with Hudson Soft.

=== 2011–2012: Return in music and Green boy project ===
"Every" was released at Chaku-Uta on April 12, 2011, as their first song since "Haruka" (2009). It was used for Asahi Beer commercials. The song was included as a B-side for their single, "Hana Uta" released on June 22, 2011.

"Green boys" was released on May 6, 2011, and was used as the theme song for the NHK documentary show Athlete no Tamashii. It was part of the "Green boys project" to help the victims of the 2011 Tohoku earthquake and tsunami. In that day, GReeeeN also announced the start of the "Green boys project" by handwriting. At that time, all members of GReeeeN, who witnessed the damage caused by the 2011 Tohoku earthquake and tsunami in their hometown of Fukushima, started this project with the idea that "At this moment, music may be able to help relax, warm, or encourage someone." GReeeeN launched the "Green boys project" with two challenges. First, "Green boys" will be distributed free of charge for a limited time (until September 30, 2011), as well as Japanese, English, Spanish, Chinese, Taiwanese, and Korean. Second, They started to make a music video of "Green boys" with everyone's feeling from solicit photos.

=== 2013–2016: Departure from Kōriyama ===
In 2013, CD booklet materials and media reports indicated that the members were based in different regions for their activities, with HIDE and navi associated with Hokkaido, 92 with Okinawa, and SOH continuing activities in Kōriyama.

In 2014, GReeeeN released their sixth studio album Ima kara Oyayubi ga Kieru Tejina Shimasu. The track “Shinobi” from the album was used as the opening theme for the Japanese dub of Teenage Mutant Ninja Turtles.

In March 2015, Whiteeeen debuts as a sister group of GReeeeN with a single, "Aiuta~since 2007~ (愛唄〜since 2007〜)". In April 2015, GReeeeN’s song “Kiseki” was adopted as a departure melody at JR East Kōriyama Station in Fukushima Prefecture, alongside other songs used for different platforms.

In 2016, それってキセキ ～GReeeeNの物語～, a biographical book about the group based on interviews and research, was published by Futabasha.

=== 2017–present: 10th anniversary and new beginning ===
On January 7, 2017, GReeeeN held their 10th anniversary live event at Saitama Super Arena. On January 24, 2017, the group released the greatest-hits compilation album ALL SINGLeeeeS ~& New Beginning~.

Following this period, the group released few works under the GReeeeN name until 2024, when they announced a rebranding to GRe4N BOYZ after departing from their previous management agency, High Speed Boyz, and transitioning to an independent structure. The group stated that the name change marked a fresh start in their activities.

In 2024, GRe4N BOYZ collaborated with Tak Matsumoto of B’z on a cover of “Mokuren no Namida” (originally by Stardust Revue), included on the kayōkyoku covers album The Hit Parade II.

In 2025, they provided the 27th opening theme song “ANGEL & DEVIL” for the television anime One Piece, marking their first contribution to the series’ theme music lineup. A promotional collaboration video Kiseki × ONE PIECE (Manga Collaboration) was also released, featuring their 2008 single “Kiseki”.

On 2026, the group provided the theme song "Green Boys" for the film 4 Outs, starring Masaki Aiba.

== Public image ==
As of 2025, the identities of GRe4N BOYZ's members remain undisclosed, as they have never revealed their faces to the public. Initially, the group suggested they would unveil their identities after all members passed the 2009 dental license exam; however, they later opted to maintain anonymity to prevent any disruption to their careers as dentists. Consequently, no media appearances showcase the members' real faces, and they have not appeared in promotional videos for their releases.

=== Appearance on TV program ===
GRe4N BOYZ has made several notable appearances on television programs throughout their career:

- MUSIC BARパロパロ (2007): On January 19, 2007, the group made a studio guest appearance on TV-U Fukushima's "MUSIC BARパロパロ," where they concealed their faces with drawing paper.
- NEWS23 (2016): HIDE, the leader of GReeeeN, made a voice-only appearance on TBS's late-night news program "NEWS23" on March 3, 2016. He discussed his experiences and emotions while participating in the inspection work after the 2011 Great East Japan Earthquake. This marked his first media appearance in this manner, emphasizing the importance of remembering the events of the disaster.
- Mezamashi TV (2016): On September 14, 2016, GReeeeN members (excluding SOH) appeared on Fuji TV's morning news program "Mezamashi TV" to promote their album "Ren." They appeared in costumes representing the members' images.
- SONGS (2016): On December 8, 2016, GReeeeN appeared in costume on NHK's late-night program "SONGS."
- Kiseki -Anohi no Sobito- (2017): Masaki Suda discussed GReeeeN's live performances and background in relation to the movie "Kiseki -Anohi no Sobito-" on January 28, 2017. This marked the first time all members performed together.
- On August 8, 2020, GReeeeN appeared in the special music program "Live Ale," which was part of the "NHK with Corona Project." This marked their first appearance in a special music program. This appearance followed an interview with Teruyoshi Uchimura on the broadcast "Minna de Yale Kickoff Special" on July 9 of the same year.
- 71st NHK Kouhaku Uta Gassen (2020): GReeeeN made their debut appearance on the "71st NHK Kouhaku Uta Gassen" on December 31, 2020, performing in the NHK Hall. This marked their first appearance on the show. It's expected that footage of their appearance on the show may be televised.
- Peek-a-boo! (2021): On January 31, 2021, HIDE appeared in costume as "HIDE-chan (5 years old) from Dakaland" on NHK Education's "Peek-a-boo!" In addition, on February 15, 2021, HIDE and navi made a remote appearance on ABC TV's "Seki Jam Complete Burn Show," represented by 3D characters with only their voices audible.

=== Appearance on radio program ===
GRe4N BOYZ has made several notable appearances on radio programs throughout their career:

- On May 1, 2007, the group appeared on Nippon Broadcasting System's "Terry Ito Notteke Radio (テリー伊藤のってけラジオ)."
- After a seven-year hiatus, GRe4N BOYZ appeared on a radio program on August 6, 2014. They participated in the Fukushima FM 20th Anniversary Special, titled "GReeeeN is here !! HAPPY LOVE SMILE Festival !!" Due to broadcast logistics, the appearance took place from a special studio separate from the Fukushima FM headquarters.
- On August 19, 2016, GRe4N BOYZ made their first national radio broadcast appearance with "GReeeeN's All Night Nippon Gold."
- The group made their debut appearance on "SCHOOL OF LOCK!" on February 22, 2017.
- On January 4, 2019 (midnight, January 5), GRe4N BOYZ collaborated with MISIA for the first time on "MISIA and GReeeeN HIDE's All Night Nippon." This appearance coincided with their collaboration on "Aino Katachi feat. HIDE (GReeeeN)."
- Members HIDE and 92 appeared as the first guests on the new program "Rajiru Lab" on NHK Radio 1 on March 30, 2020.
- HIDE made guest appearances on "Toshio Suzuki's Studio Ghibli Sweaty" on October 25 and November 1, 2020.
- On December 5, 2020, 92 began hosting the regular broadcasting of "92ラジ" (Saturday 17:00-17:30) on RBCi Radio in Okinawa Prefecture.

== Musical activities ==
=== Composition ===
GRe4N BOYZ’s music production is carried out through computer-based recording and digital editing, with all members performing solely as vocalists. Vocals are recorded individually and assembled during post-production to create the final arrangements. In interviews, JIN has been described as being responsible for the group’s production and sound direction, working closely with the members to develop musical arrangements in a studio-based environment.

The group’s production approach emphasizes collaborative development of melodies and arrangements rather than traditional band-style recording, reflecting a workflow centered on digital construction of songs. Media profiles describe their sound as blending pop and rock elements with influences from hip hop and reggae, resulting in a style that has been characterized as a mixture of genres within J-pop-based production frameworks.

== Discography ==
=== Studio albums ===
No.	Title	Album details	Peak chart positions		Certifications	Sales
No.	Title	Album details	JPN	TWN EA	Certifications	Sales
1	Ā, Domo. Hajimemashite	Released: June 28, 2007; Format: CD; Label: Nayutawave	2		RIAJ: 3× Platinum	JPN: 578,000
2	Ā, Domo. Ohisashiburi Desu.	Released: June 25, 2008; Format: CD, CD+DVD; Label: Nayutawave Records	1		RIAJ: Million	JPN: 902,000
3	Shio, Koshō	Released: June 10, 2009; Format: CD, CD+DVD; Label: Nayutawave Records	1		RIAJ: Million	JPN: 1,006,000
4	Utautai ga Uta Utai ni Kite Uta Utae to Iu ga Utautai ga Uta Utau dake Utaikire ba Uta Utau keredomo Utautai dake Uta Utaikirenai kara Uta Utawanu!?	Released: June 27, 2012; Format: CD, CD+DVD; Label: Nayutawave Records	2		RIAJ: Platinum	JPN: 209,000
5	Iine!(´・ω・｀)☆	Released: June 19, 2013; Format: CD, CD+DVD; Label: Nayutawave Records	3		RIAJ: Gold	
6	Ima kara Oyayubi ga Kieru Tejina Shimasu.	Released: August 6, 2014; Format: CD, CD+DVD; Label: Nayutawave Records	2		RIAJ: Gold	JPN: 57,000
7	En	Released: September 14, 2016; Format: CD, CD+DVD; Label: Zen Music	4			JPN: 48,000
8	UreD	Released: April 11, 2018; Format: CD, CD+DVD; Label: Zen Music	3			
9	Dai Ku	Released: September 25, 2019; Format: CD, CD+DVD; Label: Zen Music	8	2		JPN: 16,478
10	Bokutachi No Denkosekka	Released: January 6, 2021; Format: CD+acrylic ornament; Label: Zen Music	5			

=== Compilation albums ===
Title	Album details	Peak chart positions	Certifications	Sales
Title	Album details	JPN	Certifications	Sales
Ima Made no A Men, B Men Dest!?	Released: November 25, 2009; Format: 2CD, 2CD+8cmCD; Label: Nayutawave	1	RIAJ: 3× Platinum	JPN: 558,000
C, D Dest!?	Released: June 24, 2009; Format: CD, CD+DVD; Label: Zen Music	2	RIAJ: Gold	
All Singleeees (& New Beginning)	Released: January 24, 2017; Format: 2CD, 2CD; Label: Zen Music	1	RIAJ: Gold	

=== Live albums ===
Title	Album details	Peak chart positions	Sales
Title	Album details	JPN	Sales
AB Dest!? Tour!? 2010	Released: May 26, 2010; Format: 3CD; Label: Nayutawave Records	10	JPN: 22,000

=== Singles ===
Title	Year	Peak chart positions			Certifications	Sales	Album
Title	Year	JPN Oricon	JPN Hot 100 (Note: The Japan Hot 100 was established in February 2008.)	RIAJ Digital Tracks (Note: The RIAJ "Reco-kyō" monthly ringtone chart is a depreciated chart that ran from 2006 until 2009.) (Note: The RIAJ Digital Track Chart is a depreciated chart that ran from 2009 until early 2012 and tracked full-length cellphone downloads.)	Certifications	Sales	Album
"Michi" (道, Road)	2007	39	—N/a	27*	RIAJ (streaming): Platinum	JPN: 27,000	Ā, Domo. Hajimemashite
"High G.K Low (Hajikero)" (HIGH G.K LOW ～ハジケロ～, Let's Burst)"	2007	97	—N/a	—		JPN: 2,000	Ā, Domo. Hajimemashite
"Ai Uta" (愛唄, Love Song)	2007	2	—N/a	1*	RIAJ (physical): Platinum; RIAJ (ringtone): 3× Million; RIAJ (cellphone): 2× Million; RIAJ (PC): 2× Platinum; RIAJ (streaming): 2× Platinum	JPN: 256,000	Ā, Domo. Hajimemashite
"Hito" (人, People)	2007	8	—N/a	6*	RIAJ (cellphone): Platinum	JPN: 40,000	Ā, Domo. Ohisashiburi Desu.
"Be Free/Namidazora" (BE FREE/涙空, Sky of Tears)	2008	6	1 —	5*; 8*		JPN: 47,000	Ā, Domo. Ohisashiburi Desu.
"Tabidachi" (旅立ち, Trip)	2008	10	23	11*		JPN: 47,000	Ā, Domo. Ohisashiburi Desu.
"Kiseki"	2008	1	1	1*	RIAJ (physical): 2× Platinum; RIAJ (ringtone): 3× Million; RIAJ (cellphone): 2× Million; RIAJ (PC): 3× Platinum; RIAJ (digital): 4× Million; RIAJ (streaming): 2× Platinum	JPN: 558,000	Ā, Domo. Ohisashiburi Desu.
"Ashiato" (足跡, Footprints) Collaboration with Back-On as Bareeeeeeeeeen	2008	7	6	2*		JPN: 35,000	Non-album single
"Tobira" (扉, Door)	2008	2	3	3*	RIAJ (physical): Gold; RIAJ (cellphone): Gold	JPN: 87,000	Shio, Koshō
"Ayumi" (歩み, Walk)	2009	2	2	1*	RIAJ (physical): Gold; RIAJ (ringtone): 3× Platinum; RIAJ (cellphone): Platinum; RIAJ (PC): Gold; RIAJ (digital): Million	JPN: 124,000	Shio, Koshō
"Setsuna" (刹那, Moment)	2009	4	4	1*	RIAJ (ringtone): Million; RIAJ (cellphone): 2× Platinum; RIAJ (digital): 3× Platinum	JPN: 97,000	Shio, Koshō
"Haruka" (遥か, Far Off)	2009	2	1	1	RIAJ (physical): Gold; RIAJ (streaming): Platinum	JPN: 145,000	Shio, Koshō
"Good Lucky!" Collaboration with Becky as Goocky (グッキー, Gukkī)	2011	12	17	18		JPN: 16,000	Utautai ga Uta Utai ni Kite; Uta Utae to Iu ga Utautai ga Uta Utau dake Utaikire ba Uta Utau keredomo Utautai dake Uta Utaikirenai kara Uta Utawanu!?
"Hana Uta" (花唄, Flower Song)	2011	7	5	7		JPN: 22,000	Utautai ga Uta Utai ni Kite; Uta Utae to Iu ga Utautai ga Uta Utau dake Utaikire ba Uta Utau keredomo Utautai dake Uta Utaikirenai kara Uta Utawanu!?
"So Ra Shi Do" (ソラシド, Sol La Si Do)	2011	10	13	6		JPN: 19,000	Utautai ga Uta Utai ni Kite; Uta Utae to Iu ga Utautai ga Uta Utau dake Utaikire ba Uta Utau keredomo Utautai dake Uta Utaikirenai kara Uta Utawanu!?
"Koibumi (Love Letter)" (恋文〜ラブレター〜, Love Letter (Love Letter))	2011	9	3	2		JPN: 29,000	Utautai ga Uta Utai ni Kite; Uta Utae to Iu ga Utautai ga Uta Utau dake Utaikire ba Uta Utau keredomo Utautai dake Uta Utaikirenai kara Uta Utawanu!?
"Misenai Namida wa, Kitto Itsuka" (ミセナイナマダハ、きっといつか, The Tears I Can't Show, Surely Someday)	2012	6	4	1	RIAJ (digital): Platinum	JPN: 40,000	Utautai ga Uta Utai ni Kite; Uta Utae to Iu ga Utautai ga Uta Utau dake Utaikire ba Uta Utau keredomo Utautai dake Uta Utaikirenai kara Uta Utawanu!?
"Orenji" (オレンジ Orange)	2012	8	4	1	RIAJ (digital): Platinum	JPN: 18,000	Utautai ga Uta Utai ni Kite; Uta Utae to Iu ga Utautai ga Uta Utau dake Utaikire ba Uta Utau keredomo Utautai dake Uta Utaikirenai kara Uta Utawanu!?
"Oh Meiwaku" (OH 迷惑, Oh Trouble)	2012	13	17	15		JPN: 8,000	Utautai ga Uta Utai ni Kite; Uta Utae to Iu ga Utautai ga Uta Utau dake Utaikire ba Uta Utau keredomo Utautai dake Uta Utaikirenai kara Uta Utawanu!?
"Yuki no Ne" (雪の音, Sound of Snow)	2012	6	4	—N/a	RIAJ (digital): Platinum		Iine!(´・ω・｀)☆
"Sakura Color" (桜color, Cherry Color)	2013	7	7	—N/a			Iine!(´・ω・｀)☆
"Icarus"	2013	8	9	—N/a			Iine!(´・ω・｀)☆
"Heroes"	2013	12	19	—N/a	RIAJ (digital): Gold		Iine!(´・ω・｀)☆
"Itoshikimi e" (愛し君へ, To my beloved)	2013	14	12	—N/a	RIAJ (digital): Gold; RIAJ (PC): Platinum; RIAJ (streaming): Gold		Ima kara Oyayubi ga Kieru Tejina Shimasu.
"Bokura no Monogatari" (僕らの物語, Our story)	2013	16	6	—N/a			Ima kara Oyayubi ga Kieru Tejina Shimasu.
"Aisubeki Ashita, Isshun to Issho o" (愛すべき明日、一瞬と一生を)	2014	8	10	—N/a			Ima kara Oyayubi ga Kieru Tejina Shimasu.
"Sakamoto"	2015	35	57	—N/a			En
"Yume" (夢, Dream)	2016	22	19	—N/a			En
"Hajimari no Uta" (始まりの唄, Beginning Song)	2016	27	23	—N/a			En
"Beautiful Days"	2016	43	23	—N/a			En
"Akatsuki no Kimi ni" (暁の君に)	2016	36	45	—N/a			All Singleeees (& New Beginning)
"Tetote to Tentoten" (テトテとテントテン) Collaboration with Whiteeeen	2017	25	31	—N/a			
"Harō Kagerō" (ハローカゲロウ, Hello Ephemera)	2018	14	5	—N/a			UreD
"Okuru Kotoba" (贈る言葉)	2018	18	17	—N/a			
"Yakusoku" (約束, Promise) Collaboration with "No title"	2019	22	42	—N/a			
"Hoshikage no Yell" (星影のエール)	2020	5			RIAJ (digital): Gold		
"Yurayura" (ゆらゆら)	2020						Bokutachi No Denkosekka
"Omajinai" (おまじない)	2020						Bokutachi No Denkosekka
"Tsubomi" (蕾)	2021						Bokutachi No Denkosekka
"Omajinai" (おまじない)	2021						Bokutachi No Denkosekka
"Senkō Hayabusa" (閃光ハヤブサ)	2024						Ā, Domo. Aratamemashite.
"Binder from Year Zero" (ゼロ年目からのバインダー)	2024						Ā, Domo. Aratamemashite.
"Shōnen" (少年)	2024						Ā, Domo. Aratamemashite.
"Speed" (スピード)	2025						Ā, Domo. Mataoaishimashitane. Ā,,
"Angel&Devil" (天使と悪魔)	2025						Ā, Domo. Mataoaishimashitane. Ā,,
"Hoshikuzunodansu Horu" (星くずのダンス ホール)	2025						Non-album single
"Shape of Love" (アイノカタチ)	2025						Ā, Domo. Mataoaishimashitane. Ā,,
"Akaki Gunjō" (アカキ群青)	2025						Ā, Domo. Mataoaishimashitane. Ā,,
"Hoshi no Uta" (星の詩)	2025						Ā, Domo. Mataoaishimashitane. Ā,,
"Otakebi" (雄叫び)	2025						Ā, Domo. Mataoaishimashitane. Ā,,
"Shiosai no Uta" (潮騒の詩)	2026						Ā, Domo. Mataoaishimashitane. Ā,,

== Awards ==
=== Japan Gold Disc Awards ===
Year	Nominee / work	Award	Result
2007	Greeeen	New Artist of the Year	Won
2007	"Ai Uta"	Chaku-Uta Song of the Year	Won
2008	"Kiseki"	The Best 10 Single	Won
2008	"Kiseki"	Chaku-Uta Song of the Year	Won
2008	"A, Domo. Ohisashiburi Desu."	The Best 10 Album	Won
2009	"Haruka"	Song of the Year	Won
2009	"Shio, Koshō"	The Best 5 Album	Won
2009	"Ima Made no A Men, B Men Dest!?"	The Best 5 Album	Won

=== Japan Record Awards ===
Year	Nominee / work	Award	Result
2009	Shio, Koshō	Best Album	Won
2009	Shio, Koshō	Album Award	Won

=== Student Voice Awards ===
Year	Nominee / work	Award	Result
2008	"Kiseki"	Best Ringtone	Won

=== Yahoo! Music Awards ===
Year	Nominee / work	Award	Result
2008	"Ai Uta"	Works category	Won

== Films ==
Year	Film	Director	Screenwriter	Distributor
2017	キセキ -あの日のソビト- (KISEKI Sobito of That Day)	Atusi Kanesige	Hirosi Saito	Toei(JPN)
2019	愛唄 -約束のナクヒト- (Ai Uta Nakuhito of Promise)	Taisuke Kawamura	GReeeeN/Tadasi Shimizu	Toei(JPN)

== Video game ==
A Mobiclip powered videogame based on the band called HUDSONxGReeeeN Live!? DeeeeS!? (HUDSON×GReeeeN ライブ!? DeeeeS!?) was developed and released by Hudson Soft on April 1, 2010.
