= Kiseki (Greeeen song) =

Single by Greeeen

from the album Ā, Domo. Ohisashiburi Desu.
- Released: May 28, 2008
- Genre: Pop rock
- Length: 8:31
- Label: Universal Music Group
- Songwriter: Greeeen

Greeeen singles chronology
"Tabidachi" (2008)	"Kiseki" (2008)	"Tobira" (2008)

"Kiseki" (キセキ) is the 7th single released by Greeeen on May 28, 2008. The term "Kiseki" is the kakekotoba of "Miracle" (奇跡, Kiseki) and "Track" (軌跡, Kiseki) in the lyrics of the song.

It reached the number-one position on the Japanese Oricon weekly charts for 2 weeks and physically sold over 500,000 copies. The song was ranked at the number-one position on the Billboard Japan Hot 100 Singles Yearly Charts of 2008. On May 28, 2009, it was announced that the sales of the full-track ringtone digital-format version (Chaku Uta Full) of the song passed 2.3 million copies, surpassing the Japanese digital sales record of Thelma Aoyama's single "Soba ni Iru ne". The song was given the certificate for the "best selling download single in Japan" by the Guinness World Records on June 29, 2009.

== Track list ==
1. Kiseki (キセキ; Miracle)
2. Rookies (ルーキーズ) – a manga written by Masanori Morita which also turned into a Japanese television drama with "Kiseki" as their main song.

== Covers ==
The song also was covered by Andrew W.K., Kazunari Ninomiya, C.J. Lewis, Shigeru Matsuzaki and Choi Min-ho. A cover performed by Rie Takahashi was used as an ending theme for the anime Teasing Master Takagi-san season 2, in episodes 3 and 4. Fujin Rizing!, a fictional ska band from multimedia franchise Argonavis from BanG Dream! covered the song and added in the game started on January 14, 2021.

== See also ==
- List of best-selling singles
- List of best-selling singles in Japan
