= Ayaka discography =

- Studio albums: 8
- Compilation albums: 3
- Singles: 16
- Video albums: 4

The discography of Ayaka consists of eight studio albums, two compilation albums, a cover album and numerous singles, released through Warner between 2006 and 2009, and through Ayaka's independent label, A Station, from 2012 onwards.

== Studio albums ==
Title	Album details	Peak positions			Sales	Certifications
Title	Album details	JPN	TWN (Note: The G-Music chart was established in July 2005 and only archives the top 20 releases.) (Note: Position was taken from 2006 week 49 for First Message, 2008 week 27 for Sing to the Sky.)	TWN East Asian (Note: Position was taken from 2006 week 49 for First Message, 2008 week 29 for Sing to the Sky, Rainbow Road.)	Sales	Certifications
First Message	Released: November 1, 2006; Label: Warner; Formats: CD, digital download	1	—	3	1,202,000	RIAJ: Million
Sing to the Sky	Released: June 25, 2008; Label: Warner; Formats: CD, CD+Music Video DVD, CD+Live DVD, digital download	1	17	1	615,000	RIAJ: 3× Platinum
The Beginning	Released: February 1, 2012; Label: A Station; Formats: CD, CD+DVD, digital download	1	—	—	211,000	RIAJ: Platinum
Rainbow Road (レインボーロード, Reinbō Rōdo)	Released: April 15, 2015; Label: A Station; Formats: CD, 3CD, 3CD+DVD, digital download	3	—	15	75,000	RIAJ: Gold
30 y/o	Released: November 14, 2018; Label: A Station; Formats: CD, 2CD, 2CD+DVD, 2CD+Blu-ray, digital download	9	—	—	21,000	
Love Cycle	Released: February 1, 2022; Label: A Station; Formats: CD, 2CD+DVD, digital download	14	—	—	4,841	
Funtale	Released: June 21, 2023; Label: A Station; Formats: CD, CD+DVD, 2CD+Blu-ray, digital download	15	—	—		
Wonder!	Released: September 3, 2025; Label: A Station; Formats: CD, CD+DVD, digital download	22	—	—	2,615	

== Compilation albums ==
Title	Album details	Peak positions					Sales	Certifications
Title	Album details	JPN	KOR	KOR Overseas	TWN	TWN East Asian (Note: Position was taken from 2009 week 41 for Ayaka's History.)	Sales	Certifications
Ayaka's History 2006–2009	Released: September 23, 2009; Label: Warner; Formats: CD, CD+DVD, CD+Photobook, digital download	1	87	26	10	1	946,000	RIAJ: Million
Ayaka's Best: Ballad Collection	Released: September 26, 2012; Label: Warner; Formats: CD+DVD, digital download	7	—	—	—	—	44,000	RIAJ: Gold
THIS IS ME ~ayaka 10th anniversary BEST~	Released: July 13, 2016; Label: AStation; Formats: 3CD+DVD, 3CD+DVD+USB, digital download	3	—	—	—	—	81,000	RIAJ: Gold

== Cover albums ==
Title	Album details	Peak positions	Sales	Certifications
Title	Album details	JPN	Sales	Certifications
Yūon Club: 1st Grade (遊音倶楽部; "Fun Music Club")	Released: September 4, 2013; Label: A Station; Formats: CD, CD+DVD, digital download	4	95,000	RIAJ: Gold
Yūon Club: 2nd Grade (遊音倶楽部～2nd grade～; "Fun Music Club")	Released: May 13, 2020; Label: A Station; Formats: CD, CD+DVD, digital download	5	—N/a	—N/a

== Live albums ==
Title	Album details
iTunes Session	Released: March 16, 2015; Label: A Station; Formats: digital download
15th Anniversary Tour 2021 〜mottoiihini〜 (Live at Tokyo KokuritsuYoyogikyougijou Daiichitaiikukan 2021.11.23) (15th Anniversary Tour 2021 〜もっといい日に〜(Live at 国立代々木競技場 第一体育館 2021.11.23); "15th Anniversary Tour 2021 ~Motto Ei Ni~ (Live at Yoyogi National Stadium First Gymnasium 2021.11.23)")	Released: June 21, 2023; Label: A Station; Formats: digital download

== Singles ==
Title	Year	Peak chart positions		Sales	Certifications	Album
Title	Year	Oricon Singles Charts	Billboard Japan Hot 100 (Note: The Japan Hot 100 was established in February 2008.)	Sales	Certifications	Album
"I Believe"	2006	3	64	276,000	RIAJ (ringtone): Million; RIAJ (download): 3× Platinum; RIAJ (physical): Platinum	First Message
"Melody (Sounds Real)"	2006	14	—	25,000		First Message
"Real Voice"	2006	11	—	51,000	RIAJ (cellphone): Gold; RIAJ (ringtone): 3× Platinum; RIAJ (physical): Gold	First Message
"Mikazuki"	2006	1	60	284,000	RIAJ (ringtone): 2× Million; RIAJ (download): 2× Million; RIAJ (physical): Platinum; RIAJ (streaming): Platinum	First Message
"Winding Road" (Ayaka x Kobukuro)	2007	2	—	359,000	RIAJ (ringtone): 2× Million; RIAJ (download): Million; RIAJ (physical): Platinum; RIAJ (streaming): Gold	Sing to the Sky
"Jewelry Day"	2007	2	—	73,000	RIAJ (ringtone): Million; RIAJ (cellphone): Platinum; RIAJ (physical): Gold; RIAJ (PC): Gold	Sing to the Sky
"Clap & Love"	2007	2	—	68,000	RIAJ (download): Gold; RIAJ (physical): Gold	Sing to the Sky
"Why"	2007	2	—	68,000	RIAJ (cellphone): Gold; RIAJ (physical): Gold	Sing to the Sky
"For Today"	2007	—	74		RIAJ (cellphone): Gold	Sing to the Sky
"Te o Tsunagō"	2008	7	2	42,000	RIAJ (cellphone): Platinum; RIAJ (PC): Gold	Sing to the Sky
"Ai o Utaō"	2008	7	—	42,000		Sing to the Sky
"Okaeri"	2008	6	3	46,000	RIAJ (ringtone): 3× Platinum; RIAJ (download): 3× Platinum	Sing to the Sky
"Anata to" (Ayaka x Kobukuro)	2008	2	2	152,000	RIAJ (ringtone): 2× Platinum; RIAJ (download): 2× Platinum; RIAJ (physical): Gold	Ayaka's History 2006–2009
"Yume o Mikata ni"	2009	6	2	50,000	RIAJ (download): Platinum	Ayaka's History 2006–2009
"Koi Kogarete Mita Yume"	2009	6	89	50,000		Ayaka's History 2006–2009
"Minna Sora no Shita"	2009	4	4	40,000	RIAJ (download): 2× Platinum; RIAJ (streaming): Gold	Ayaka's History 2006–2009
"Tsuyoku Omou" (ツヨク想う; "Think Hard")	2012	—	14		RIAJ (download): Gold	Rainbow Road
"Beautiful"	2013	12	7	15,000	RIAJ (download): Gold	Rainbow Road
"Chiisa na Ashiato" (ちいさな足跡; "Little Footprints")	2013	12	52	15,000		Rainbow Road
"Arigatō no Wa" (ありがとうの輪; "Circle of Thanks")	2013	—	13		RIAJ (download): Gold	Rainbow Road
"Number One"	2014	15	11	9,000		Rainbow Road
"Nijiiro" (にじいろ; "Rainbow-colored")	2014	8	5	50,000	RIAJ (download): 3× Platinum; RIAJ (streaming): Platinum	Rainbow Road
"Kotonoha" (コトノハ; "Kotonoha")	2017	25	33	5,000		30 y/o
"Sakura" (サクラ; "Cherry Blossoms")	2017	—	—			30 y/o
"Heart Up" (Ayaka x Daichi Miura)	2018	23	10	8,000		30 y/o
"GLORY" (Ayaka x KREVA)	2018	—	—			30 y/o
"Michishirube" (道しるべ; "Guidepost")	2020	—	— (Note: "Michishirube" did not enter Billboard Japan Hot 100, but peaked at number 99 on the component Billboard Japan Download Songs.)			LOVE CYCLE
"Xmas Santa"	2020	—	—			LOVE CYCLE
"Motto Ii Hi ni" (もっといい日に; "On a Better Day")	2021	—	—			LOVE CYCLE
"Tender Love"	2021	—	—			LOVE CYCLE
"Kinmokusei" (キンモクセイ; "Osmanthus")	2021	—	—			LOVE CYCLE
"Mirai e" (未来へ; "To the future")	2022	—	—			Funtale

=== Promotional singles ===
Title	Year	Peak chart positions	Certifications	Album
Title	Year	Billboard Japan Hot 100	Certifications	Album
"Peace Loving People"	2006	—	RIAJ (cellphone): Gold	"Real Voice" (single)
"Kon'ya mo Hoshi ni Dakarete" (今夜も星に抱かれて...; "Tonight Too, I Am Wrapped in the Stars...")	2008	—	RIAJ (download): Gold	Sing to the Sky
"Hajimari no Toki" (はじまりのとき; "A New Beginning in Me")	2012	3	RIAJ (download): Platinum	The Beginning
"Hello"	2012	17		The Beginning
"The Beginning"	2012	—		The Beginning
"Sora to Kimi no Aida ni" (空と君のあいだに; "Between You and the Sky")	2013	—		Yūon Club
"Hitomi o Tojite" (瞳をとじて; "Close Your Eyes")	2013	—		Yūon Club
"No End"	2015	71		Rainbow Road
"Negaiboshi" (ねがいぼし; "Longevity") (Ayaka x Daichi Miura)	2020	— (Note: "Negaiboshi" did not enter Billboard Japan Hot 100, but peaked at number 28 on the component Billboard Japan Download Songs.)		LOVE CYCLE
"Mou Ichido" (もう一度; "Once Again") (among "re: project")	2020	—		—N/a
"Blue Moon"	2021	— (Note: "Blue Moon" did not enter Billboard Japan Hot 100, but peaked at number 51 on the component Billboard Japan Download Songs.)		LOVE CYCLE
"Victim of Love" (feat. Taka)	2022	72		LOVE CYCLE
The Notebook (百年十色; Hyakunen Jushoku)	2022	—		LOVE CYCLE
"Beautiful World" (Kōji Tamaki feat. Ayaka)	2022	— (Note: "Beautiful World" did not enter Billboard Japan Hot 100, but peaked at number 75 on the component Billboard Japan Download Songs.)		Funtale
"Mikazuki - From THE FIRST TAKE" (三日月 - From THE FIRST TAKE)	2023	—		data-sort-value="" style="background: var(--background-color-interactive, #ececec); color: var(--color-base, inherit); vertical-align: middle; text-align: center; " class="table-na" | —N/a
"Home"	2023	----		Funtale
"Zutto Kimi to" (ずっとキミと)	2024	----		Wonder!
"Versailles" (Versailles - ベルサイユ -)	2025	== --- ==		Wonder!

== Video albums ==
List of media, with selected chart positions
Title	Album details	Peak positions		
Title	Album details	JPN DVD	JPN Blu-ray	TWN (Note: Position was taken from 2010 week 7 for MTV Unplugged.)
Ayaka Live Tour: First Message	Released: April 4, 2007; Label: Warner; Formats: DVD, Blu-ray	2	—	—
MTV Unplugged Ayaka	Released: January 13, 2010; Label: Warner; Formats: DVD, DVD/CD, Blu-ray	2	—	13
Ayaka Live Tour 2012: The Beginning~Hajimari no Toki	Released: December 12, 2012; Label: A Station; Formats: DVD, DVD/bonus CD, Blu-ray	6	5	—
Ayaka Live Tour 2013: Fortune Cookie~Nani ga Deru Kana!? at Nippon Budokan	Released: March 5, 2014; Label: A Station; Formats: DVD, Blu-ray	6	23	—
Nijiiro Tour 3-Star Raw Niya Kagiri no Super Premium Live 2014.12.26	Released: March 18, 2015; Label: A Station; Formats: 2DVD, Blu-ray	17	34	—
ayaka 10th Anniversary SUPER BEST TOUR	Released: March 8, 2017; Label: A Station; Formats: DVD, Blu-ray	11	17	—
Acoustic Live Tour 2017-2018 ～3-STAR RAW～	Released: March 14, 2018; Label: A Station; Formats: 2DVD, Blu-ray	20	24	—
AYAKA ONLINE LIVE SELECTION 2020	Released: August 18, 2021; Label: A Station; Formats: DVD, Blu-ray, 2DVD, DVD/Blu-ray	20	32	—
The Notebook (百年十色; Hyakunen Jushoku)	Released: June 1, 2023; Label: A Station; Formats: DVD/Book, Blu-ray/Book	—	—	—
