= Ayaka's History 2006–2009 =

Greatest hits album by Ayaka
- Released: September 23, 2009
- Recorded: 2006–2009
- Genre: Pop
- Length: Disc 1: 74:20; Disc 2: 47:17
- Label: Warner Music Group
- Producer: Yoshihiko Nishio; Ayaka

Ayaka chronology
Sing to the Sky (2008)	Ayaka's History 2006–2009 (2009)	The Beginning (2012)

Ayaka's History 2006–2009 is Ayaka's first compilation album, released on September 23, 2009. The album was released in three versions: 2CD+DVD (limited), 2CD+Photo book (limited) and a regular one disc edition.

The album is certified Million by Recording Industry Association of Japan (RIAJ) for shipment of 1,000,000 copies.

== Track listing ==
All lyrics are written by Ayaka, except "Winding Road" and "Anata to", which are co-written with Kobuchi Kentarō and Shunsuke Kuroda of Kobukuro.

Disc1: CD
No.	Title	Music	Arranger(s)	Length
1.	"I Believe"	Yoshihiko Nishio, Ayaka	L.O.E	4:56
2.	"Melody"	Nishio	L.O.E	3:28
3.	"Real Voice"	Nishio	L.O.E	3:56
4.	"Mikazuki"	Nishio, Ayaka	L.O.E	4:36
5.	"Winding Road"	Ayaka, Kentarō Kobuchi, Shunsuke Kuroda	Ayaka, Kentarō Kobuchi, Shunsuke Kuroda	4:56
6.	"Jewelry Day"	Nishio	L.O.E	5:19
7.	"Clap & Love"	Nishio, Ayaka	Akihisa Matsuura	3:19
8.	"Why"	Nishio, Ayaka	L.O.E	4:26
9.	"For Today"	Nishio, Ayaka	L.O.E	3:44
10.	"Te o Tsunagō"	Nishio, Ayaka	L.O.E	4:49
11.	"Ai o Utaō"	Nishio, Ayaka	Tomoji Sogawa	4:59
12.	"Okaeri"	Nishio, Ayaka	Akihisa Matsuura	4:42
13.	"Anata to"	Ayaka, Kobuchi, Kuroda	Ayaka, Kobuchi, Kuroda	5:24
14.	"Yume o Mikata ni"	Ayaka, Kōichi Tsutaya	Akihisa Matsuura	4:11
15.	"Koi Kogarete Mita Yume"	Ayaka	Shintarō Tokita (Sukima Switch)	6:00
16.	"Minna Sora no Shita"	Ayaka	Akihisa Matsuura	4:56

All lyrics are written by Ayaka.

Disc 2: CD
No.	Title	Music	Arranger(s)	Length
1.	"Yume no Kakera" (夢のカケラ "Pieces of A Dream")	Nishio	L.O.E	3:20
2.	"Blue Days" (ブルーデイズ "Burū Deizu")	Nishio	L.O.E	4:53
3.	"Sky"	Nishio, Ayaka	L.O.E	4:35
4.	"Peace Loving People"	Nishio, Ayaka	Tomoki Ishizuka	3:43
5.	"Power of Music"	Nishio, Ayaka	Satoru Shionoya	4:41
6.	"Konya mo Hoshi ni Dakarete..." (今夜も星に抱かれて… "Held Again By the Stars Tonight...")	Nishio, Ayaka	Satoru Shionoya	4:11
7.	"Good Night Baby" (グンナイベイビー "Gunnai Beibī")	Nishio, Ayaka	L.O.E	3:07
8.	"Start to 0 (Love)"	Nishio	L.O.E	3:58
9.	"Kimi ga Iru Kara" (君がいるから "Because You're Here")	Nishio, Ayaka	Seiji Kameda	4:17
10.	"Arigatō." (ありがとう。 "Thank You.")	Ayaka	Seiji Kameda	4:57
11.	"Minna Sora no Shita ~Piano version~" (Bonus track)	Ayaka		5:02

Disc3: DVD
No.	Title	Length
1.	"I Believe" (Music video)
2.	"Melody" (Music video)
3.	"Real Voice" (Music video)
4.	"Mikazuki" (Music video)
5.	"Winding Road" (Music video)
6.	"Jewelry Day" (Music video)
7.	"Clap & Love" (Music video)
8.	"Why" (Music video)
9.	"For Today" (Music video)
10.	"Te o Tsunagō" (Music video)
11.	"Okaeri" (Music video)
12.	"Anata to" (Music video)
13.	"Yume o Mikata ni" (Music video)
14.	"Minna Sora no Shita" (Music video)
15.	"ayaka's Real Backstage & Documentary 2009" (Special movie)

== Charts ==
=== Charts ===
Chart (2010)	Peak position
Japan Oricon Weekly Album Chart	1
Japan Oricon Yearly Album Chart	6
Japan Oricon albums chart	54
G-Music Combo Chart (Taiwan)	10
G-Music J-pop Chart (Taiwan)	1
G-Music International Chart (Taiwan)	2
Five Music J-pop/K-pop Chart (Taiwan)	1
Soundscan Albums Chart (CD+DVD)	1
Soundscan Albums Chart (CD+Photo book)	3
Soundscan Albums Chart (CD-Only)	1

== Certifications ==
Country	Provider	Sales	Certification
Japan	RIAJ	1,000,000	Million
