= Live Earth concert, Tokyo =

Concert event

Live Earth
- Concert location
Location	Makuhari Messe, Chiba, Japan
Founded by	Al Gore and Kevin Wall
Date	July 7, 2007
Genre(s)	Pop and Rock music
Website	Live Earth Japan Site

The main Live Earth concert in Japan was held at Makuhari Messe, Chiba nearby Tokyo on 7 July 2007.

== Running order ==
- Genki Rockets – "Heavenly Star", "Breeze" (T 12:06)
- Rize – "Kami", "American Hero", "Moral", "Pink Spider", "SOS", "Heiwa", "Stand Up", "Far Eastern Tribe" (T 12:46)
- Ayaka – "Mikazuki", "Clap", "Peace Loving People", "Real Voice", "Jewelry Day" (T 13:06)
- Ai Otsuka – "Ren'ai Shashin", "Hane Ari Tamago", "PEACH", "CHU-LIP", "Happy Days", "LOVE MUSiC" (T 13:46)
- Ai – "I Wanna Know," "E.O.," "I'll Remember You," "Story", "Watch Out!", "Music", "Brand New Day" (T 14:16)
- Xzibit – "X", "Symphony in X Major", "Paparazzi", "Multiply", "The Next Episode", "What's the Difference", "Thank You", "Concentrate" (T 14:56)
- Abingdon Boys School – "Howling" "Nervous Breakdown", "Nephilim," "Lost Reason", "Fre@K $HoW", "Innocent Sorrow" (T 15:36)
- Cocco – "Tsuyoku Hakanai Mono-tachi," "Heaven's Hell," "Harehireho," "Chiisa na Machi," "Dugong no Mieru Oka" (T 16:16)
- Linkin Park – "One Step Closer", "Lying from You", "Somewhere I Belong", "No More Sorrow", "Papercut", "From the Inside", "Numb", "Pushing Me Away (Piano Version)", "Breaking The Habit", "Crawling", "In The End", "Bleed It Out", "The Little Things Give You Away", "What I've Done", "Faint" (T 16:56)
- Kumi Koda – "Cherry Girl", "But", "Kiseki", "Freaky", "Girls" (T 17:36)
- Rihanna – "Pon De Replay", "Break It Off", "SOS", "Rehab", "Breakin' Dishes", "Is This Love", "Hate That I Love You", "Unfaithful", "Sell Me Candy, "Don't Stop the Music", "Shut Up and Drive", "Umbrella" (T 18:16)

== Barricade incident ==
During the second song played by Linkin Park, fans broke down the barricade and were crushing other fans thus stopping the show after the song "Lying from You" for about 15 to 20 minutes. the band made some attempt to keep the crowd entertained by playing classic songs and have Joe Hahn scratch over some beats, the stage manager made a speech telling the fans to be careful or they'd stop the show in Japanese during the last few minutes of the ordeal.

== Coverage ==
MSN held the online broadcasting of the concert.
