= MTV Video Music Award Japan for Album of the Year =

Annual Japanese music award

- Country: Japan
- Presented by: MTV Japan
- First award: 2003

The MTV Video Music Award Japan for Album of the Year (最優秀アルバム賞) is an annual award given by MTV Japan since 2003.

== Results ==
The following table displays the nominees and the winners in bold print with a yellow background.

=== 2000s ===
Year	Artist	Album
**2003** (2nd)	**Chemistry**	**Second to None**
**2003** (2nd)	Eminem	The Eminem Show
**2003** (2nd)	Avril Lavigne	Let Go
**2003** (2nd)	Rip Slyme	Tokyo Classic
**2003** (2nd)	Hikaru Utada	Deep River
**2004** (3rd)	**Outkast**	**Speakerboxxx/The Love Below**
**2004** (3rd)	Missy Elliott	This Is Not A Test!
**2004** (3rd)	Exile	Exile Entertainment
**2004** (3rd)	Linkin Park	Meteora
**2004** (3rd)	Mika Nakashima	Love
**2005** (4th)	**Orange Range**	**MusiQ**
**2005** (4th)	Eminem	Encore
**2005** (4th)	Green Day	American Idiot
**2005** (4th)	Ken Hirai	Sentimentalovers
**2005** (4th)	Usher	Confessions
**2006** (5th)	**Orange Range**	**Natural**
**2006** (5th)	The Black Eyed Peas	Monkey Business
**2006** (5th)	Ketsumeishi	Ketsunopolis 4
**2006** (5th)	Mr. Children	I Love You
**2006** (5th)	Oasis	Don't Believe The Truth
**2007** (6th)	**Daniel Powter**	**Daniel Powter**
**2007** (6th)	Ayaka	First Message
**2007** (6th)	Def Tech	Catch The Wave
**2007** (6th)	Kumi Koda	Black Cherry
**2007** (6th)	Red Hot Chili Peppers	Stadium Arcadium
**2008** (7th)	**Exile**	**Exile Love**
**2008** (7th)	Ketsumeishi	Ketsunopolice 5
**2008** (7th)	Kumi Koda	Kingdom
**2008** (7th)	Avril Lavigne	The Best Damn Thing
**2008** (7th)	Ne-Yo	Because of You
**2009** (8th)	**Mr. Children**	**Supermarket Fantasy**
**2009** (8th)	Ayaka	Sing to the Sky
**2009** (8th)	Coldplay	Viva La Vida or Death and All His Friends
**2009** (8th)	Ne-Yo	Year of the Gentleman
**2009** (8th)	Hikaru Utada	Heart Station

=== 2010s ===
Year	Artist	Album
**2010** (9th)	**Exile**	**Aisubeki Mirai e (愛すべき未来へ)**
**2010** (9th)	Namie Amuro	Past < Future
**2010** (9th)	The Black Eyed Peas	The E.N.D.
**2010** (9th)	Green Day	21st Century Breakdown
**2010** (9th)	Superfly	Box Emotions
**2011** (10th)	**Kana Nishino**	**To Love**
**2011** (10th)	Eminem	Recovery
**2011** (10th)	Miliyah Kato	Heaven
**2011** (10th)	Linkin Park	A Thousand Suns
**2011** (10th)	Yui	Holidays in the Sun
**2012** (11th)	**Girls' Generation**	**Girls' Generation**
**2012** (11th)	Coldplay	Mylo Xyloto
**2012** (11th)	Juju	You
**2012** (11th)	Kara	Super Girl
**2012** (11th)	Lady Gaga	Born This Way
**2013** (12th)	**2PM**	**Legend of 2PM**
**2013** (12th)	Carly Rae Jepsen	Kiss
**2013** (12th)	Linkin Park	Living Things
**2013** (12th)	Kana Nishino	Love Place
**2013** (12th)	One Direction	Take Me Home
**2014** (13th)	**Kyary Pamyu Pamyu**	**Nanda Collection**
**2014** (13th)	Beyoncé	Beyoncé
**2014** (13th)	Daft Punk	Random Access Memories
**2014** (13th)	Maximum the Hormone	Yoshū Fukushū
**2014** (13th)	J Soul Brothers III	Blue Impact
**2016** (15th)	Japanese album	Album
**2016** (15th)	**Babymetal**	**Metal Resistance**
**2016** (15th)	Back Number	Chandelier
**2016** (15th)	Bump of Chicken	Butterflies
**2016** (15th)	Kana Nishino	Just Love
**2016** (15th)	Perfume	Cosmic Explorer
**2016** (15th)	International album	Album
**2016** (15th)	**Beyoncé**	**Lemonade**
**2016** (15th)	Adele	25
**2016** (15th)	Drake	Views
**2016** (15th)	Justin Bieber	Purpose
**2016** (15th)	Rihanna	Anti
**2018** (17th)	**Hikaru Utada**	**Hatsukoi**
**2019** (18th)	**Gen Hoshino**	**Pop Virus**

=== 2020s ===
Year	Artist	Album
**2020** (19th)	**Babymetal**	**Metal Galaxy**
**2021** (20th)	**Official Hige Dandism**	**Editorial**
**2022** (21st)	**Aimyon**	**Falling into Your Eyes Record**
**2023** (22nd)	**Aiko**	**Ima no Futari o Otagai ga Miteru**

== See also ==
- MTV Europe Music Award for Best Album
