= MTV Video Music Award Japan for Best Female Video =

Annual Japanese music award

Best Female Video (最優秀女性アーティストビデオ賞)

== Results ==
The following table displays the nominees and the winners in bold print with a yellow background.

=== 2000s ===
Year	Artist	Video
**2002** (1st)	**Ayumi Hamasaki**	
**2002** (1st)	Janet Jackson	
**2002** (1st)	Misia	
**2002** (1st)	Britney Spears	
**2002** (1st)	Hikaru Utada	
**2003** (2nd)	**Hikaru Utada**	**"Sakura Drops" (Sakuraドロップス)**
**2003** (2nd)	Avril Lavigne	"Complicated"
**2003** (2nd)	Jennifer Lopez featuring Styles P and Jadakiss	"Jenny from the Block"
**2003** (2nd)	Misia	"Back Blocks"
**2003** (2nd)	Ringo Shiina	"Kuki (STEM)" (茎 (STEM))
**2004** (3rd)	**Ayumi Hamasaki**	**"Because of You"**
**2004** (3rd)	Beyoncé featuring Jay-Z	"Crazy in Love"
**2004** (3rd)	BoA	"Double"
**2004** (3rd)	Mika Nakashima	"Yuki no Hana" (雪の華)
**2004** (3rd)	Britney Spears featuring Madonna	"Me Against the Music"
**2005** (4th)	**Mika Nakashima**	**"Sakurairo Mau Koro" (桜色舞うころ)**
**2005** (4th)	Ayumi Hamasaki	"Inspire"
**2005** (4th)	Avril Lavigne	"My Happy Ending"
**2005** (4th)	Jennifer Lopez	"Get Right"
**2005** (4th)	Hikaru Utada	"Easy Breezy"
**2006** (5th)	**Kumi Koda**	**"Butterfly"**
**2006** (5th)	Namie Amuro	"WoWa"
**2006** (5th)	Mariah Carey	"We Belong Together"
**2006** (5th)	Madonna	"Hung Up"
**2006** (5th)	Nana starring Mika Nakashima	"Glamorous Sky"
**2007** (6th)	**Kumi Koda**	**"Yume No Uta" (夢のうた)**
**2007** (6th)	Ayaka	"Mikazuki" (三日月)
**2007** (6th)	Fergie	"London Bridge"
**2007** (6th)	Reira starring Yuna Ito	"Truth"
**2007** (6th)	Gwen Stefani	"Wind It Up"
**2008** (7th)	**Fergie**	**"Big Girls Don't Cry"**
**2008** (7th)	Alicia Keys	"No One"
**2008** (7th)	Kumi Koda	"Ai no Uta" (愛のうた)
**2008** (7th)	Mika Nakashima	"Life"
**2008** (7th)	Ai Otsuka	"Peach"
**2009** (8th)	**Namie Amuro**	**"New Look"**
**2009** (8th)	Thelma Aoyama	"Nando Mo" (何度も)
**2009** (8th)	Beyoncé	"If I Were a Boy"
**2009** (8th)	Britney Spears	"Womanizer"
**2009** (8th)	Hikaru Utada	"Prisoner of Love"

=== 2010s ===
Year	Artist	Video
**2010** (9th)	**Namie Amuro**	**"Fast Car"**
**2010** (9th)	Ayaka	"Minna Sora no Shita" (みんな空の下)
**2010** (9th)	Kaela Kimura	"Butterfly"
**2010** (9th)	Lady Gaga	"Poker Face"
**2010** (9th)	Rihanna	"Russian Roulette"
**2011** (10th)	**Lady Gaga**	**"Born This Way"**
**2011** (10th)	Miliyah Kato	"X.O.X.O."
**2011** (10th)	Rihanna	"Only Girl (In the World)"
**2011** (10th)	Taylor Swift	"Mine"
**2011** (10th)	Yui	"Rain"
**2012** (11th)	**Namie Amuro**	**"Love Story"**
**2012** (11th)	Ayaka	"Hajimari no Toki" (はじまりのとき)
**2012** (11th)	Björk	"Crystalline"
**2012** (11th)	Kana Nishino	"Tatoe Donnani…" (たとえ どんなに…)
**2012** (11th)	Rihanna featuring Calvin Harris	"We Found Love"
**2013** (12th)	**Kana Nishino**	**"Always"**
**2013** (12th)	Alicia Keys featuring Nicki Minaj	"Girl on Fire"
**2013** (12th)	Juju	"Arigatō" (ありがとう)
**2013** (12th)	Rihanna	"Diamonds"
**2013** (12th)	Taylor Swift	"We Are Never Ever Getting Back Together"
**2014** (13th)	**Miley Cyrus**	**"We Can't Stop"**
**2014** (13th)	Katy Perry	"Roar (song)"
**2014** (13th)	Namie Amuro	"Ballerina"
**2014** (13th)	Beyoncé	"Drunk in Love"
**2014** (13th)	Sheena Ringo	"Irohanihoheto"
**2015** (14th)	**Namie Amuro**	**"Birthday"**
**2016** (15th)	**Hikaru Utada**	**"Manatsu no Tōriame"**
**2016** (15th)	Namie Amuro	"Mint"
**2016** (15th)	JUJU	"What You Want"
**2016** (15th)	Kyary Pamyu Pamyu	"Sai & Go"
**2016** (15th)	Kana Nishino	"Anata no Suki na Tokoro"
**2017** (16th)	**Kana Nishino**	**"Package"**
**2018** (17th)	**Aiko**	**"straw (ストロー)"**
**2019** (18th)	**Aimyon**	**"Kon'ya kono mama (今夜このまま)"**

== See also ==
- MTV Video Music Award for Best Female Video
- MTV Europe Music Award for Best Female
