= Sing to the Sky =

Studio album by Ayaka
- Released: 25 June 2008
- Genre: J-Pop; Pop-rock
- Label: Warner Music Records
- Producer: Nishio Yoshihiko; Ayaka

Ayaka chronology
First Message (2006)	Sing to the Sky (2008)	Ayaka's History 2006–2009 (2009)

Sing to the Sky is the second album from Japanese singer, Ayaka.

== Background ==
Second album from Ayaka was confirmed on 26 April 2008. It is to include all of her singles from Jewelry Day up to the latest Okaeri. There are three versions, first press CD+DVD (music video collection), CD+DVD (live performance video collection), and CD-only version. Second bonus track "I Believe (English Version)" only comes with the CD+DVD versions. In one in a hundred first press discs, there's a "gold ticket" which can be traded in for a special DVD like Ayaka's first album. Fifteenth track "Konya mo Hoshi ni Dakarete" is the theme song of the 2008 film The Sky Crawlers.

== Commercial performance ==
Sing to the Sky debuted at #3 on Oricon Daily Charts with index sales of more than 44,000 copies, however, the next day the album moved to #2 for 5 days and finally reached #1 on its seventh day. By the end of the week the album debuted at #2 on the weekly charts with sales of more than 315,000 copies, a little less than her debut album. Sing to the Sky was kept out of the top position by Greeeen's second album A, Domo. Ohisashiburi Desu., which sold more than 377,000 copies.

Sing to the Sky has been certified Triple Platinum by RIAJ for shipment of 750,000 copies.

== Track listing ==
All lyrics are written by Ayaka.

Disc1: CD
No.	Title	Music	Arranger(s)	Length
1.	"Power of Music"	Ayaka, Yoshihiko Nishio	Satoru Shionoya
2.	"Ai o Utaō (愛を歌おう, Let's Sing Love)"	Ayaka, Yoshihiko Nishio	Tomoji Sogawa
3.	"Sky"	Ayaka, Yoshihiko Nishio	L.O.E
4.	"Jewelry Day"	Yoshihiko Nishio	L.O.E
5.	"Good Night Baby (グンナイベイビー)"	Ayaka, Yoshihiko Nishio	L.O.E
6.	"For Today"	Ayaka, Yoshihiko Nishio	L.O.E
7.	"Why"	Ayaka, Yoshihiko Nishio
8.	"Gold Star (ゴールドスター)"	Ayaka, Yoshihiko Nishio	L.O.E
9.	"Mahō Tsukai no Shiwaza (魔法使いのしわざ, The Magician's Deeds)"	Ayaka, Yoshihiko Nishio	L.O.E
10.	"Te o Tsunagō (手をつなごう, Let's Hold Hands)"	Ayaka, Yoshihiko Nishio	L.O.E
11.	"Ai mo Uso mo Shinjitsu (愛も嘘も真実, Love, Lies, and Truth)"	Ayaka, Yoshihiko Nishio	Jun Abe
12.	"Clap & Love"	Ayaka, Yoshihiko Nishio	Akihisa Matsuura
13.	"Kimi ga Irukara (君がいるから, Because I Have You)"	Ayaka, Yoshihiko Nishio	Seiji Kameda
14.	"Okaeri (おかえり, Welcome Home)"	Ayaka, Yoshihiko Nishio	Akihisa Matsuura
15.	"Konya mo Hoshi ni Dakarete (今夜も星に抱かれて, Wrapped in the Stars Tonight)"	Ayaka, Yoshihiko Nishio	Satoru Shionoya
16.	"Winding Road (with Kobukuro)" (bonus track)	Kentaro Kobuchi&Shunsuke Kuroda (Kobukuro), Ayaka	K. Kobuchi&S. Kuroda, Ayaka
17.	"I Believe <English Version>" (bonus track)	Ayaka, Yoshihiko Nishio	L.O.E

Disc2: Music video DVD
No.	Title	Length
1.	"I Believe"
2.	"Melody"
3.	"Real Voice"
4.	"Mikazuki (三日月)"
5.	"Winding Road"
6.	"Jewelry Day"
7.	"Clap & Love"
8.	"Why"
9.	"For Today" (Live)
10.	"Te o Tsunagō (手をつなごう)"
11.	"Okaeri (おかえり)"

Disc3: DVD -Live at Nippon Budokan-
No.	Title	Length
1.	"I Believe"
2.	"Start to 0 (Love)"
3.	"Real Voice"
4.	"Stay with Me"
5.	"1・2・3・4"
6.	"Why"
7.	"Peace Loving People"
8.	"Jewelry Day"
9.	"Tsuyoku Naritai (Ken Hirai cover) (強くなりたい)"
10.	"Mikazuki (三日月)"
11.	"Te o Tsunagō (手をつなごう)"
12.	"I Want You Back" (Jackson 5 cover)
13.	"Clap & Love"
14.	"For Today"
15.	"Kimi no Power to Otona no Furi (君のパワーと大人のフリ)"
16.	"Power of Music" (Encore)
17.	"Rairarai (ライラライ)" (Encore)
18.	"Message" (Encore)

== Charts ==
Oricon Sales Chart (Japan)

Release	Chart	Peak position	First week sales	Sales total
June 25, 2008	Oricon Daily Album Chart	1		
June 25, 2008	Oricon Weekly Album Chart	2	315,373	614,872
June 25, 2008	Oricon Monthly Album Chart	2		
June 25, 2008	Oricon Yearly Album Chart	15		577,405
