= 2007 MTV Video Music Awards Japan =

Annual Japanese music awards ceremony

- Date: May 26, 2007
- Location: Saitama Super Arena, Saitama, Saitama, Japan
- Hosted by: Misaki Ito and Hidehiko Ishizuka
- Website: mtvjapan.com/mvaj

Television/radio coverage
- Network: MTV Japan

Hosted by Misaki Ito and Hidehiko Ishizuka, the awards show took place at the Saitama Super Arena before a live audience of 12,000 fans. The 6th annual show premiered live on MTV, Saturday May 26 to over 6.6 million homes in Japan.

== Awards ==
Winners are in bold text.

=== Video of the Year ===
Kumi Koda — "Yume No Uta"

- Fergie — "London Bridge"
- Mr. Children — "Shirushi"
- Red Hot Chili Peppers — "Dani California"
- Shōnan no Kaze — "Junrenka"

=== Album of the Year ===
Daniel Powter — Daniel Powter

- Ayaka — First Message
- Def Tech — Catch The Wave
- Kumi Koda — Black Cherry
- Red Hot Chili Peppers — Stadium Arcadium

=== Best Male Video ===
DJ Ozma — "Age Age Every Night"

- Ken Hirai — "Bye My Melody"
- Kreva — "The Show"
- Daniel Powter — "Bad Day"
- Justin Timberlake — "SexyBack"

=== Best Female Video ===
Kumi Koda — "Yume No Uta"

- Ayaka — "Mikazuki"
- Fergie — "London Bridge"
- Reira starring Yuna Ito — "Truth"
- Gwen Stefani — "Wind It Up"

=== Best Group Video ===
Exile — "Lovers Again"

- Glay — "100 Man Kai No Kiss"
- My Chemical Romance — "Welcome to the Black Parade"
- Red Hot Chili Peppers — "Dani California"
- Remioromen — "Stand By Me"

=== Best New Artist ===
Ne-Yo — "So Sick"

- Angela Aki — "This Love"
- Lily Allen — "Smile"
- Jinn — "Raion"
- The View — "Wasted Little DJs"

=== Best Rock Video ===
My Chemical Romance — "Welcome to the Black Parade"

- Asian Kung-Fu Generation — "Aru Machi no Gunjō"
- Ellegarden — "Salamander"
- Fall Out Boy — "This Ain't a Scene, It's an Arms Race"
- Radwimps — "Setsunarensa"

=== Best Pop Video ===
Ai Otsuka — "Ren'ai Shashin"

- Christina Aguilera — "Ain't No Other Man"
- Chemistry — "Yakusoku no Basho"
- Rihanna — "SOS"
- Seamo — "Mata Aimashou"

=== Best R&B Video ===
Ai — "Believe"

- Ciara — "Promise"
- Miliyah Kato — "Kono Mama Zutto Asa Made"
- John Legend — "Save Room"
- Ne-Yo — "So Sick"

=== Best Hip-Hop Video ===
Kreva — "The Show"

- Jay-Z — "Show Me What You Got"
- Nas — "Hip Hop is Dead"
- T.I. — "What You Know"
- Teriyaki Boyz featuring Kanye West — "I Still Love H.E.R."

=== Best Reggae Video ===
Shōnan no Kaze — "Junrenka"

- Lily Allen — "Smile"
- Matisyahu — "King without a Crown"
- Ryo The Skywalker — "Harewataru Oka"
- Sean Paul — "Temperature"

=== Best Dance Video ===
DJ Ozma — "Age Age Every Night"

- Fergie — "London Bridge"
- Gnarls Barkley — "Crazy"
- M-Flo Loves Minmi — "Lotta Love"
- Justin Timberlake — "SexyBack"

=== Best Video from a Film ===
Ai Otsuka — "Ren'ai Shashin" (from Heavenly Forest)

- 50 Cent — "Window Shopper" (from Get Rich or Die Tryin')
- Beyoncé — "Listen" (from Dreamgirls)
- Bonnie Pink — "Love is Bubble" (from Memories of Matsuko)
- Yui — "Good-bye Days" (from Midnight Sun)

=== Best Collaboration ===
U2 and Green Day — "The Saints Are Coming"

- Akon featuring Eminem — "Smack That"
- Sérgio Mendes featuring The Black Eyed Peas — "Mas Que Nada"
- Quruli featuring Rip Slyme — "Juice"
- Ringo Shiina + Saito Neko + Shiina Junpei — "Kono Yo no Kagiri"

=== Best buzz ASIA ===
==== Japan ====
Yuna Ito — "Precious"

- Bonnie Pink — "A Perfect Sky"
- Dragon Ash — "Ivory"
- DJ Ozma — "Age Age Every Night"
- Rize — "Pink Spider"

==== South Korea ====
TVXQ — "O-Jung Ban Hop"

- Brian — "Living a Year in Winter"
- Loveholic — "Chara's Foreset"
- SS501 — "Unlock"
- Super Junior — "U"

==== Taiwan ====
Mayday — "Born to Love"

- A-Mei — "I want Happiness?"
- Show Lo — "Jin Wu Men"
- David Tao — "Too Beautiful"
- Faith Yang — "Dutchess"

== Special awards ==
=== Best Director ===
Red Hot Chili Peppers — "Dani California" (directed by Tony Kaye)

=== Best Special Effects in a Video ===
Apogee — "Ghost Song" (Yusuke Tanaka)

=== Best Stylish Artist in a Video ===
Kumi Koda

== Live performances ==
- Ai Otsuka — "Ren'ai Shashin"
- Daniel Powter — "Bad Day"
- Kreva — "The Show"
- Mika — "Grace Kelly"
- My Chemical Romance — "Welcome to the Black Parade"
- Ne-Yo — "Because of You"
- DJ Ozma — "Age Age Every Night"
- Seamo — "Cry Baby"
- Shōnan no Kaze — "Junrenka"
- TVXQ — "O - Jung.Ban.Hap."
- Yuna Ito — "Precious"

=== Red carpet live ===
- AI
- Mika

== Guest celebrities ==
- Ami Suzuki
- Chemistry
- High and Mighty Color
- Hiroshi Tanahashi
- Juri Ueno
- Kanemoto says more
- DJ Kaori
- Kumi Koda
- Leah Dizon
- Maki Goto
- Mark Hunt
- DJ Masterkey
- Mayday
- Megumi
- M-Flo
- Misono
- Namie Amuro
- Shoko Nakagawa
- Sowelu
- SpongeBob SquarePants
- Patrick
- Tatsu Chi
- W-inds.
- Wise
- Ya-kyim
- Zeebra
