= List of number-one digital singles of 2009 (Japan) =

The highest-selling digital singles in Japan are ranked in the RIAJ Digital Track Chart, published by Recording Industry Association of Japan. The chart week runs from Wednesday to Tuesday. The final December 29 chart week was merged with the following week (12/30-1/5)'s tally, due to New Year's celebrations (in a similar manner to Oricon).

== Chart history ==
Issue date	Song	Artist(s)	Reference(s)
April 7	"It's All Love!"	Kumi Koda & Misono	
April 14	"Kiss Kiss Kiss"	Beni	
April 21	"Someday"	Exile	
April 28	"Yume o Mikata ni"	Ayaka	
May 5	"Ashita ga Kuru Nara"	Juju with Jay'ed	
May 12	"Ashita ga Kuru Nara"	Juju with Jay'ed	
May 19	"Ashita ga Kuru Nara"	Juju with Jay'ed	
May 26	"Haruka"	Greeeen	
June 2	"Haruka"	Greeeen	
June 9	"Haruka"	Greeeen	
June 16	"Haruka"	Greeeen	
June 23	"Sad to Say"	Jasmine	
June 30	"Tanpopo"	Yusuke	
July 7	"Aitai"	Miliyah Kato	
July 14	"Minna Sora no Shita"	Ayaka	
July 21	"Hotaru no Hikari"	Ikimono-gakari	
July 28	"Yasashii Hikari"	Exile	
August 4	"Yasashii Hikari"	Exile	
August 11	"Sunrise (Love Is All)"	Ayumi Hamasaki	
August 18	"Sunrise (Love Is All)"	Ayumi Hamasaki	
August 25	"Tsutaetai Koto ga Konna Aru noni"	Infinity 16 welcomez Waka-danna from Shōnan no Kaze & Jay'ed	
September 1	"Tsutaetai Koto ga Konna Aru noni"	Infinity 16 welcomez Waka-danna from Shōnan no Kaze & Jay'ed	
September 8	"Tsutaetai Koto ga Konna Aru noni"	Infinity 16 welcomez Waka-danna from Shōnan no Kaze & Jay'ed	
September 15	"Sono Saki e"	Dreams Come True featuring Fuzzy Control	
September 22	"Shunkashūtō"	Hilcrhyme	
September 29	"Yell"	Ikimono-gakari	
October 6	"Shunkashūtō"	Hilcrhyme	
October 13	"Shunkashūtō"	Hilcrhyme	
October 20	"Motto..."	Kana Nishino	
October 27	"Boku wa Kimi ni Koi o Suru"	Ken Hirai	
November 3	"Motto..."	Kana Nishino	
November 10	"Ichō"	Yusuke	
November 17	"Futatsu no Kuchibiru"	Exile	
November 24	"Futatsu no Kuchibiru"	Exile	
December 1	"Dear..."	Kana Nishino	
December 8	"Fanfare"	Mr. Children	
December 15	"Kimi ga Suki"	Shota Shimizu	
December 22	"Hatsukoi"	Masaharu Fukuyama	

== See also ==
- List of number one Reco-kyō Chart singles 2006–2009
