= Love It (album) =

LOVE.IT

Studio album by Love-chan
- Released: November 18, 2009
- Genre: J-pop
- Label: Avex Trax; AVCD-23956 (Japan, CD); AVCD-23955/B (Japan, CD+DVD)

Love-chan chronology
''LOVE.IT''	TBA

Alternative cover
- CD+DVD

Singles from Love It
- 1. "Love no Theme" Released: April 11, 2007; 2. "White Choco" Released: November 21, 2007

Love It (stylized as LOVE.IT) is the debut mini-album of Ai Otsuka under her pen name Love. It was released on November 18, 2009 under the label Avex Trax, and was released only one week after the release of Otsuka's compilation album Love Is Best.

== Track listing ==
=== CD ===
1. "Magic"
2. "Starlight"
3. "Moonlight"
4. "Red Eye"
5. "White Choco"
6. "Love no Theme" (LOVEのテーマ, Love's Theme)

=== DVD ===
1. "Magic" PV
2. "White Choco" PV
3. "Love no Theme" PV
