= Nirai Kanai (disambiguation) =

Nirai Kanai is a mythical place in Ryukyuan religion.

Nirai Kanai may also refer to:

- "Nirai Kanai" (Cocco song), a song by Cocco
- "Nirai Kanai" (MAX song), a music single by the band MAX
- A fictional location in the anime television series RahXephon
  - "Nirai-Kanai" (RahXephon episode), an episode of the same TV series
- Niraikanai, a 2007 album by Inoran
