= Te o Tsunagō =

Te o Tsunagō (手をつなごう, "Let's Hold Hands") can refer to:

- "Te o Tsunagō", a 2008 song by Ayaka
- "Te o Tsunagō", a 2013 song by Shiritsu Ebisu Chugaku
