= White chocolate (disambiguation) =

White chocolate is a type of chocolate.

White chocolate may also refer to:

- Jason Williams (basketball, born 1975), basketball player who is nicknamed "White Chocolate"
- A variant of the LG Chocolate series
- "White Choco", a 2007 song by Ai Otsuka
- "White Chocolate Farm", a nickname for British singer Thom Yorke

== See also ==
- White (disambiguation)
