= Yume o Mikata ni/Koi Kogarete Mita Yume =

"Yume o Mikata ni / Koi Kogarete Mita Yume"

Single by Ayaka

from the album Ayaka's History 2006–2009
- Released: April 22, 2009
- Recorded: 2009
- Genre: J-pop
- Label: Warner Music Japan
- Songwriter(s): Ayaka, Kōichi Tsutaya, Yoshihiko Nishio

Ayaka singles chronology
"Anata to" (2008)	"Yume o Mikata ni / Koi Kogarete Mita Yume" (2009)	"Minna Sora no Shita" (2009)

Yume o Mikata ni/Koi Kogarete Mita Yume (夢を味方に/恋焦がれて見た夢) is the 11th single from Ayaka. It was released on April 22, 2009. It peaked at 6 on the Oricon Charts.

== Overview ==
Featuring two songs, "Yume o Mikata ni" and "Koi Kogarete Mita Yume", the single includes a live version of "Kimi ga Iru Kara" that was recorded from her live performance in February at Shibuya-AX. "Yume o Mikata ni" is a part of the Benesse promotion campaigns, used to cheer high school students on in their studies.

The single comes in two different versions, Limited and Regular. Limited comes with a bonus sticker.

This is Ayaka's third double A-side single, after her second released back in March 2008, "Te o Tsunagō/Ai o Utaō".

Koi Kogarete Mita Yume is featured as the closing credit soundtrack for Cross Game (クロスゲーム), an anime on the TV Tokyo Network.

== Track listing ==
All lyrics are written by Ayaka

CD
No.	Title	Music	Arranger(s)	Length
1.	""Yume o Mikata ni" (夢を味方に)"	Ayaka, Koichi Tsutaya	Akihisa Matsuura
2.	""Koi Kogarete Mita Yume" (恋焦がれて見た夢)"	Ayaka	Shintarō Tokita (Sukima Switch)
3.	"Kimi ga Iru Kara" (2009-2-13@SHIBUYA-AX Fan Club Live ver.)	Yoshihiko Nishio, Ayaka	Ritsuko Homma
4.	""Yume o Mikata ni" (夢を味方に)" (Instrumental)
5.	""Koi Kogarete Mita Yume" (恋焦がれて見た夢)" (Instrumental)
