= Love Piece =

Studio album by Ai Otsuka
- Released: September 26, 2007
- Recorded: 2006–2007
- Genre: J-pop
- Label: Avex Trax; AVCD-23396 (Japan, CD+DVD); AVCD-23397 (Japan, CD)
- Producer: Ai Otsuka

Ai Otsuka chronology
Ai am Best (2007)	Love Piece (2007)	Love Letter (2008)

Singles from Love Piece
- 1. "Frienger" Released: 12 April 2006; 2. "Yumekui" Released: 2 August 2006; 3. "Renai Shashin" Released: 25 October 2006; 4. "Chu-Lip" Released: 21 February 2007; 5. "Peach / Heart" Released: 25 July 2007

Love Piece is Ai Otsuka's fourth album. It was released in two formats: CD Only and CD + DVD. The first press of the CD+DVD version includes a special music video of the song U-Boat from Otsuka's LOVE COOK album, while the first press of the CD Only version includes a 40-page original photo-book. The first press of both versions also includes a box three times the size of a regular CD, with a coloured case in one of six colours (blue, green, black, yellow, purple or pink).

Five singles were released before the album: "Frienger", "Yumekui", "Renai Shashin", Chu-Lip", and double A-Side "Peach / Heart".

== Released in formats ==
CD + DVD

- First press edition
  - DVD including Bonus PV "U-Boat"
  - Color package（6 colors:Green,Pink,Blue,Black,Purple,Yellow）

CD only

- First press edition
  - CD+Special Photo Book
  - Color package（6 colors:Green,Pink,Blue,Black,Purple,Yellow）

== Track listing ==
All tracks are written by Ai, arranged by Ai×Ikoman.

CD
No.	Title	Length
1.	"Mirai Taxi" (未来タクシー; Future Taxi)	4:10
2.	"Yumekui" (ユメクイ; Dream Eater)	5:18
3.	"Mackerel's canned food"	4:23
4.	"Peach"	4:12
5.	"Kumuriuta" (クムリウタ; Cloudy Song)	4:59
6.	"Hoshi no Tango" (星のタンゴ; Star's Tango)	2:54
7.	"Katorisenkou" (蚊取線香; Anti Mosquito Incense)	2:07
8.	"Frienger" (フレンジャー)	3:48
9.	"Chu-Lip"	3:58
10.	"Heart"	4:50
11.	"Renai Shashin" (恋愛写真; Love Photograph)	5:00

DVD
No.	Title	Director(s)	Length
1.	"Kumuriuta" (Music video)	Shunji Iwai
2.	"Heart" (Music video)	Yukihiko Tsutsumi

first press version includes
No.	Title	Length
3.	"U-Boat" (Music video)

== Oricon sales charts (Japan) ==
Release	Chart	Peak position	First week sales	Sales total
September 26, 2007	Oricon Daily Chart	1		
September 26, 2007	Oricon Weekly Chart	1	208,031	376,115
September 26, 2007	Oricon Monthly Chart	1		
September 26, 2007	Oricon Yearly Chart	29		
