= Last Love (2007 film) =

2007 film directed by Meiji Fujita

- Film poster
- Directed by: Meiji Fujita
- Screenplay by: Ryuju
- Based on: Last Love by Yoshi
- Produced by: Kazuki Nakayama
- Starring: Masakazu Tamura; Misaki Ito; Reiko Takashima; Tsurutaro Kataoka; Yoon Son-ha
- Cinematography: Masayuki Kawada
- Edited by: Masaaki Yamamoto
- Music by: Michiru Ōshima
- Distributed by: Shochiku
- Release date: June 16, 2007 (Japan)
- Running time: 110 minutes
- Country: Japan
- Language: Japanese

Last Love (Japanese: ラストラブ, Hepburn: Rasuto rabu) is a 2007 Japanese film directed by Meiji Fujita. It is based on Yoshi's novel of the same title. The lead star is Masakazu Tamura. Tamura appeared in the movie for the first time in 14 years. Tamura made his final appearance in the film. Ending theme song Jewelry Day was sung by Ayaka.

== Plot ==
Akira Akira was a sax player in New York, but retired from it because of his wife's sudden death. One day, Akira Agawa meets Yui Uehara, a young woman who works for the cleaning station, and eventually reunite in New York. Since then, they have opened up their hearts and are gradually attracted to each other.

== Cast ==
- Masakazu Tamura as Akira Agawa
- Misaki Ito as Yui Uehara
- Reiko Takashima as Tomomi Agawa
- Ei Morisako as Sawa Agawa
- Tsurutaro Kataoka as Daigo Asakura
- Yoon Son-ha as Lee Rei
- Shigeki Hosokawa as Daiki Sakahara
