= Chu-Lip =

Single by Ai Otsuka

from the album Love Piece
- Released: February 21, 2007
- Recorded: 2007
- Genre: J-Pop
- Label: avex trax AVCD-31177/B (Japan, CD+DVD); AVCD-31178 (Japan, CD)
- Songwriter(s): Ai Otsuka

Ai Otsuka singles chronology
"Renai Shashin" (2006)	"Chu-Lip" (2007)	"Peach / Heart" (2007)

Love singles chronology
"Love no Theme" (2007)

"Chu-Lip" is Ai Otsuka's 14th single under the avex trax label. It is also her first single released in 2007.

"Chu-Lip", marks the first time that Otsuka has released more than 3 singles before the release of an album. "Chu-Lip" is a play on the Japanese word for tulip, combining the sound of a kiss ("chu") with the English word "lip." The title track of the single is used as the theme song for the TBS drama Kirakira Kenshuii, starring Manami Konishi and Eiji Wentz from WaT. The b-side of the single is "Kimi ni Kaeru.", which is a med-tempo song. The term kaeru can mean "returning" or "frog," thus the title can also be translated into "Giving You a Frog.". Otsuka can sometimes be seen carrying a stuffed animal frog on her TV performances for "CHU-LIP" because of this. Otsuka also wore a frog ring at the 58th Kōhaku Uta Gassen.

The single debuted at #3 during its first week with 55,362 copies sold. Altogether it has sold 105,233 copies and continues to chart on Oricon.

The single has been certified as being downloaded more than 1,000,000 times as a ringtone by the RIAJ, and more than 250,000 times as a full-length download to cellphones.

== Track listing ==
All tracks are written by Ai Otsuka

CD
No.	Title	Arranger(s)	Length
1.	"Chu-Lip"	Ai×Ikoman
2.	"Kimi ni Kaeru. (キミにカエル。; Returning to You.,)"	Ai×Ikoman
3.	"Chu-Lip" (Instrumental)	Ai×Ikoman
4.	"Kimi ni Kaeru. (キミにカエル。; Returning to You.,)" (Instrumental)	Ai×Ikoman

DVD
No.	Title	Length
1.	"Chu-Lip" (Music video)

== Charts ==
Oricon sales chart (Japan)

Release	Chart	Peak position	First week sales	Sales total
February 21, 2007	Oricon Daily Chart	2		
February 21, 2007	Oricon Weekly Chart	3	55,362	120,779*
