= Love no Theme =

"Loveのテーマ" "LOVE no Theme" / "Love's Theme"

Single by Love
- Released: April 11, 2007
- Recorded: 2007
- Genre: J-Pop
- Label: avex trax AVCD-31230/B (Japan, CD+DVD); AVCD-31231 (Japan, CD)
- Songwriter: Ai Otsuka

Love singles chronology
"Loveのテーマ" "LOVE no Theme" / "Love's Theme" (2007)	"White Choco" (2007)

Ai Otsuka singles chronology
"Chu-Lip" (2007)	"Peach / Heart" (2007)

Alternative cover
- The CD + DVD Cover

"Love no Theme" is Ai Otsuka's first (15th overall) single under the avex trax label under her pen name Love. It is also her second single released in 2007.

"Love no Theme", marks the first time that Ai has released a single about a character bunny name Love-chan and under her pen name Love. "I canChu♥" was the original title but it was changed to "Love no Theme".

"Love no Theme" also the opening theme for the Oshare Majo: Love and Berry anime movie, Oshare Majo: Love and Berry Shiwase no Mahou.

== Track listing ==
=== CD ===
1. Love no Teema (LOVE's Theme, LOVEのテーマ)
2. Love no Teema (instrumental)
3. Next Single Preview (White Choco)

=== DVD ===
1. Love no Theme (PV)

== Charts ==
Oricon Sales Chart (Japan)

Chart	Peak Position	First Week Sales	Sales Total	Chart Run	Ref
Oricon Daily Charts	#9		N/A		
Oricon Weekly Charts	#22	4,790	8,537	5	
Oricon Monthly Charts					
Oricon Yearly Charts					
