= Age Age Every Knight =

"Age Age Every Night"

Single by DJ OZMA

from the album I Love Party People
- A-side: "Age Age Every Night"
- B-side: "BOYS BRAVO!"
- Released: March 22, 2006
- Length: 18:31
- Label: EMI Music Japan
- Songwriters: Frank Farian; George Reyam

DJ OZMA singles chronology
"Age Age Every Night" (2006)	"Sunjon" (2006)

"Age Age Every Night" (アゲ♂アゲ♂EVERY☆騎士, Age Age Eburi Naito; "Raise The Roof Every Night") is the debut single of DJ OZMA. It peaked at #4 on the Oricon Weekly Charts and for the year of 2006 it was the #41 song on the annual charts. It is coupled with the song "BOYS BRAVO!", a cover/remix of a song performed by Kishidan. The song itself is a cover of DJ DOC's "Run to you" with new lyrics written by OZMA. "Run to you"(2000) samples from the 1976 song "Daddy Cool (Boney M. song)". The song is best known for DJ OZMA's controversial performance at the 2006 Kōhaku Uta Gassen competition.

== Background and release ==
"Age Age Endless Night" is a cover of "Run to you", a 2000 song by Korean band DJ DOC. "Run to you" samples from "Daddy Cool", a 1976 song by Boney M. "Age Age Endless Night" was released later in 2006, featuring the original music video, an alternate music video titled the "Take Off Version", a dance instruction, behind the scenes footage, and a pair of short documentaries. The limited-edition version of the single was also shipped with a DVD containing the music video.

"BOYS BRAVO!" is a Synth-pop a cover/remix of a song performed by Kishidan song as the B-side, written by DJ Ozma's alter ego, Ayanocozy Shō, and performed by Nakazato Ayami (a leading member of Ozma's backup troupe of dancing vocalists, the OZ-MAX, and a future member of SDN48).

== Track list ==
=== Single Track list ===
1. "Age Age Every Knight" (アゲ♂アゲ♂EVERY☆騎士, Age Age Eburi Naito)
2. "BOYS BRAVO!"
3. "Age Age Every Knight" (Instrumental)
4. "BOYS BRAVO!" (Instrumental)

=== Age Age Endless Night Track DVD list ===
1. "Age Age Every Knight" (アゲ♂アゲ♂EVERY☆騎士, Age Age Eburi Naito)
2. Age♂Age♂EVERY☆Night Music Clip ~Age♂Age♂Making~ (アゲ♂アゲ♂EVERY☆騎士(~アゲ♂アゲ♂メイキング~))
3. Age♂Age♂EVERY☆Night Music Clip ~Take Off Ver.~ (アゲ♂アゲ♂EVERY☆騎士)
4. Age♂Age♂Dance Master Vol.1
5. Roots of AGE♂AGE♂ ~Taiwan hen~ (台湾編)
6. Roots of AGE♂AGE♂ ~Roppongi hen~ (六本木編)

== Awards ==
For the 2007 MTV Video Music Awards Japan, the music video won in the Best Dance Video of the Year, as well as the Best Male Video of the Year.
