= Doraemon: Nobita and the Green Giant Legend =

2008 film by Ayumu Watanabe

Doraemon the Movie: Nobita and the Green Giant Legend
- Japanese Release Poster

Japanese name
- Kanji: 映画 ドラえもん のび太と緑の巨人伝
- Literal meaning: Doraemon: Nobita and the Green Giant Legend
Transcriptions
- Revised Hepburn: Eiga Doraemon Nobita to Midori no Kyojinden
- Directed by: Ayumu Watanabe
- Written by: Nashiwa Kanarate
- Produced by: Kyohito Arushin
- Starring: Wasabi Mizuta; Megumi Ōhara; Yumi Kakazu; Subaru Kimura; Tomokazu Seki; Chiaki; Maki Horikita; Takuya Yoshikoshi; Chikao Ōtsuka
- Narrated by: Sutiyo Mutonabeti
- Cinematography: Katsuyoshi Kishi
- Edited by: Toshihiko Kojima
- Music by: Kan Sawada (Original music composer); Te o Tsunagō by ayaka Yume o Kanaete Doraemon by MAO
- Production company: Shin-Ei Animation
- Distributed by: Toho
- Release date: March 8, 2008
- Running time: 112 minutes
- Country: Japan
- Language: Japanese
- Box office: $31,684,949

Doraemon the Movie: Nobita and the Green Giant Legend, (Note: Doraemon the Movie: Nobita and the Green Giant Legend (映画 ドラえもん のび太と緑の巨人伝, Eiga Doraemon Nobita to Midori no Kyojinden)) also known as Doraemon, Nobita and the Green Planet, is a 2008 Japanese animated science fantasy film that was released in Japan on 8 March 2008. It's the 28th Doraemon film.

The plot is based on the story in Doraemon manga volume 26 "Forest is living" and in volume 33 "Goodbye Ki-bō". This movie is not a remake, however, Ki-bō has appeared already in the 1992 film, Nobita and the Kingdom of Clouds.

The film was illustrated as manga in the February and March edition of CoroCoro Comic. Then it was released as the 25th film tankōbon. An action-adventure game was also released on March 6, 2008, two days before the release of the film, entitled, Nobita and the Green Giant Legend DS. (Note: Nobita and the Green Giant Legend DS (ドラえもん のび太と緑の巨人伝 DS, Doraemon Nobita to Midori no Kyojinden DS)) This movie was ranked the 8th highest grossing Japanese animated movie.

== Plot ==
Nobita's troubled about what to do with his zero test marks once again. A gust of wind scatters his test papers, and he falls into a garbage dump trying to gather them together again. There he finds a young withered tree that caught one of his papers and he decides to take it home. He tries to plant it in his garden but gets caught by his mother, who doesn't allow him to grow it.

Still wanting to keep it but not being allowed to grow, Doraemon comes up with the idea of making it come alive with a gadget he uses. Nobita names the little tree "Kibō" because all it can say is "ki". As the days pass, Nobita's parents also accept Kibō because he was a very smart boy who helped Nobita's mother whenever he was away. However, aliens from the Planet of Green decides to pass judgement claiming humans were destroying all the green on Earth. Nobita and his friends manage to escape by coincident and arrive at their planet. They are warmly welcomed to their city of Green Pier but also learn of what they are doing to their planet.

Unfortunately, with all his gadgets borrowed by Dorami, there was little Doraemon could do. They manage to escape and come across Princess Rire who tricks them into thinking she was leading them home but along the way, learns that what her adviser was about to do was wrong. Eventually with the help of the alien planet's Elder they manage to return to Earth which was already invaded. Fortunately the time watch Doraemon had dropped had frozen life on Earth giving them a chance to save everyone. The aliens try to summon their giant using Kibō to wipe out all humans despite the Elder's warnings and the plan backfires on them.

But with Nobita's persistence, he wakes up Kibō and everything is restored as the Elder sacrifices himself. Princess Rire announces to her people that they will watch Earth for the time being while Kibō decides to travel around space to learn more and become like the Elder. Nobita and his friends say goodbye to Kibō and go home. Back at Nobita's home, Nobita's mother calls to him and Doraemon to come down for dinner, and one can see Kibo's shoe beside Nobita's shoe.

== Music ==
- Opening song: "Yume o Kanaete Doraemon" (夢をかなえてドラえもん), sung by MAO.
- Theme song: "Te o Tsunagō" (手をつなごう), sung by ayaka.

== Cast ==
Character	Japanese voice actor
Doraemon	Wasabi Mizuta
Nobita Nobi	Megumi Ōhara
Suneo Honekawa	Tomokazu Seki
Shizuka Minamoto	Yumi Kakazu
Takeshi "Gian" Gōda	Subaru Kimura
Dorami	Chiaki
Princess Lire	Maki Horikita
Ki-Bo	Takuya Yoshikoshi
Queen Remu	Maki Horikita
Shiraa	Chikao Ōtsuka
Jii	Yuji Miyake
Paruna	Teppei Arita
Roku-chan	Yoko Tsuchiya
Moya-kun	Jinbei Watanabe
Tamako Nobi	Kotono Mitsuishi
Nobisuke Nobi	Yasunori Matsumoto
Hidetoshi Dekisugi	Shihoko Hagino
Mountain	Kotomi Ishida
Seedling	Ueno Ibuki
Mountain's father	Junichi Sugawara
Mountain's mother	Maru Tamari
Announcer	Hidenari Ugaki
Soldiers	Naomi Kusumi; Yasuhiro Takato; Fumihiko Goto
Lady–in–Waiting	Tomoe Sakuragawa
Girl watering cans	Tamaki Matsumoto
Congressmen	Akira Chiba; Daihare Kawashima; Masaya Matsuzaki; Nodera Niki; Yutaro Kobayashi; Kana Yamaguchi; Masashi Watanabe
Children	Yuki Mizuguchi; Yuma Maruyama; Luke Namiki; Kei Okawa; Yuta Ueno; Nao Nakamura

== Reception ==
Doraemon the Movie: Nobita and the Green Giant Legend grossed $31,684,949 at the box office.

== Accolades ==
In 2009, this film was nominated as the Animation of the Year.

== See also ==
- List of Doraemon films
