= Cocco =

Japanese singer (born 1977)

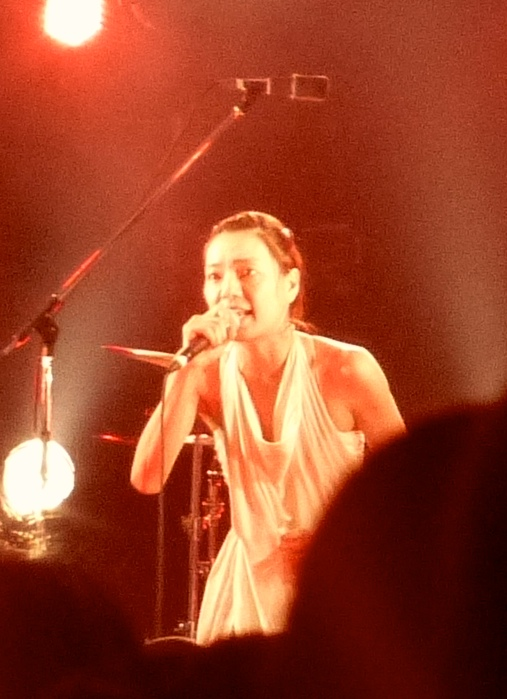

Background information
- Born: 真喜志 智子 (Makishi Satoko); January 19, 1977 (age 49); Naha, Okinawa, Japan
- Genres: J-pop; Folk; Pop; Rock; Alternative rock; Grunge
- Occupation: Singer-songwriter
- Years active: 1996–2001; 2006–present
- Label: Speedstar Records
- Formerly of: Singer Songer
- Website: www.cocco.co.jp

Makishi Satoko (Japanese: 真喜志 智子), known professionally as Cocco (こっこ), is a Japanese pop/folk rock singer.

== Early life ==
Cocco attended numerous ballet auditions in pursuit of becoming a professional ballerina. To cover travel expenses for a ballet audition in Tokyo, she also participated in singing auditions. Although she did not pass the ballet audition, she impressed the judges and was later signed by Victor Entertainment.

== Career ==
Cocco made her debut on an indie label under the name "Cocko" with a self-titled EP Cocko on November 21, 1996. A track from the EP, Sing a Song ~No Music, No Life~, was used in an advertising campaign for Tower Records Japan.

On March 21, 1997, Cocco changed the official spelling of her name to "Cocco" and released her major label debut single Countdown. A full-length album followed shortly after. It was not until 1998 when she scored a big hit in Japan with Tsuyoku Hakanaimonotachi, which sold more than 250,000.

Cocco went on to record three more albums – Kumuiuta in 1998, Rapunzel in 2000, and Sangurōzu in 2001. Before the release of Sangurōzu, Cocco announced she was retiring from the music business. Later that year, her label released a career retrospective, Best + Ura Best + Mihappyōkyokushū, which contained her singles, some b-sides and five unreleased tracks.

Her retirement did not last long. In 2002, she published her first art book, Minami no Shima no Hoshi no Suna. In August 2003, she organized a benefit concert to raise awareness about cleaning up beaches in Okinawa. A DVD documentary entitled Heaven's Hell followed in December.

2004 saw her appearance on the Yutaka Ozaki cover album "BLUE" and the publication of her second book, Minami no Shima no Koi no Uta, which was accompanied by a limited edition single, "Garnet/Celeste Blue". In 2005, Cocco collaborated with photographer/singer Nanaco on a CD/book combination titled The Bird.

In late 2004, Cocco teamed up with Shigeru Kishida of the Japanese rock group Quruli to re-record "Sing a Song" for Tower Records' 25th Anniversary in Japan. The sessions inspired the formation of Singer Songer, a band featuring Cocco, Kishida, Quruli bassist Masashi Sato, Cornelius support keyboardist Hirohisa Horie and former FEED drummer Dai Taro.

Singer Songer made its live debut as special guests at Quruli's year-end concert in December 2004, and in May 2005, the band released a single, "Shoka Rinrin". An album, Barairo Pop was released in June 2005. It contains a selection of country-flavored tracks that are much happier than Cocco's previous works.

In April 2006, she wrote a series of essays for Mainichi Shimbun. Since then, Cocco has continued to write for various newspapers and magazines.

On July 7, 2007, Cocco performed at the Japanese leg of Live Earth at the Makuhari Messe, Chiba. After releasing the album Kira Kira, she started living in the UK and went to college to learn photography.

In 2010, Cocco published her first long novel, Polomerria. She performed at the World Happiness 2010 rock festival in Tokyo on August 8 and released Emerald, her first self-produced album, on August 11. She also provided the theme song, Yagi no Sanpo, for 14-year-old director Ryugo Nakamura's debut feature film Yagi no Boken. She got a letter from the youngest film director in Japanese film history, and she decided to help the boy.

In 2011, the no-budget indie film Inspired movies produced by Cocco and her fellow video artists was released.

In 2011, Cocco made her acting debut, starring in KOTOKO, directed by Shinya Tsukamoto. She was also responsible for the art direction and music.

She covered "Good Bye" for the June 6, 2018 hide tribute album Tribute Impulse.

== Discography ==
=== Studio albums ===
Year	Album details	Chart positions	Total sales
1997	Bougainvillea (ブーゲンビリア, Būgenbiria): Released: May 21, 1997; Label: Victor Entertainment (VICL-60037); Formats: CD	33	122,000
1998	Kumuiuta (クムイウタ, Lullaby): Released: May 13, 1998; Label: Victor Entertainment (VICL-60205); Formats: CD	1	878,000
2000	Rapunzel (ラプンツェル, Rapuntseru): Released: June 14, 2000; Label: Victor Entertainment (VICL-60576); Formats: CD	1	380,000
2001	Sangu Rose (サングローズ, Sang Rose): Released: April 18, 2001; Label: Victor Entertainment (VICL-60723); Formats: CD	5	226,000
2006	Zancyan (ザンサイアン, Mermaid Cyan): Released: June 21, 2006; Label: Victor Entertainment (VICL-61954); Formats: CD	3	127,000
2007	Kirakira (きらきら, Sparkling): Released: July 25, 2007; Label: Victor Entertainment (VICL-62411); Formats: CD	6	91,000
2010	Emerald (エメラルド, Emerarudo): Released: August 11, 2010; Label: Victor Entertainment (VICL-63648); Formats: CD	5	39,000
2014	Pas de Bourrée (パ・ド・ブレ, Pa Do Bure): Released: March 12, 2014; Label: Victor Entertainment (VICL-64138); Formats: CD		
2014	Plan C (プランC, Puran C): Released: October 8, 2014; Label: Victor Entertainment (VICL-64214); Formats: CD		
2016	Adan Ballet (アダンバレエ, Adan Barei): Released: August 24, 2016; Label: Victor Entertainment (VICL-64616); Format: CD		
2019	Star Shank (スターシャンク, Sutāshanku): Released: October 2, 2019; Label: Victor Entertainment; Format: CD	14	6,403
2021	Kuchinashi (クチナシ, Kuchinashi): Released: February 17, 2021; Label: Victor Entertainment; Format: CD	9	
2022	Prom (プロム, Puromu): Released: March 23, 2022; Label: Victor Entertainment; Format: CD	15	
2024	Beatrice (ビアトリス, Biatorisu): Released: February 14, 2024; Label: Victor Entertainment; Format: CD	19	3,375

=== Compilation albums ===
Year	Album details	Chart positions	Total sales
2001	Best + Ura Best + Mihappyōkyokushū (ベスト+裏ベスト+未発表曲集; "Best, B-side Best and Unreleased Songs Collection"): Best of album; Released: September 5, 2001; Re-released: July 25, 2007; Label: Victor Entertainment (VICL-60770/1); Formats: CD, digital download	1	504,000
2011	The Best Ban (ザ・ベスト盤, The Best Disc): Best of album; Released: August 15, 2011; Label: Victor Entertainment; Formats: CD, digital download	4	
2017	20 Shuunen Request Best+Rare Tracks (20周年リクエストベスト＋レアトラックス, 20th Anniversary Request Best+Rare Tracks): Best of album; Released: March 21, 2017; Label: Victor Entertainment; Formats: CD, digital download		

=== Singles ===
==== Indie label ====
Year	Title
1996	"Cokco": Label: bounce (indie label)

==== Major label ====
Year	Title	Oricon singles sales chart		Album
Year	Title	peak position	total sales	Album
1997	"Countdown" (カウントダウン)	98	2,200	Bougainvillea
1997	"Tsuyoku Hakanai Monotachi" (強く儚い者たち, The Strong and Ephemeral)	18	361,000	Kumuiuta
1998	"Raining"	17	128,000	Kumuiuta
1998	"Kumoji no Hate" (雲路の果て, End of the Road Through the Clouds)	6	144,000	Rapunzel
1999	"Jukai no Ito" (樹海の糸, Threads in the Deep Forest)	3	182,000	Rapunzel
1999	"Plumeria" (ポロメリア, Poromeria)	9	97,000	Rapunzel
2000	"Mizu Kagami" (水鏡, Water Reflection)	10	68,000	Rapunzel
2000	"Kemono Michi" (けもの道, Animal Trail): Re-cut single.	10	37,000	Rapunzel
2000	"Hoshi ni Negai o" (星に願いを, When You Wish Upon a Star)	25	32,000	Sangu Rose
2001	"Hane: Lay Down My Arms" (羽根～ｌａｙ ｄｏｗｎ ｍｙ ａｒｍｓ～, Feathers: lay down my arms)	16	38,000	Sangu Rose
2001	"Fūka Fūsō" (風化風葬, Burial in the Elements): Okinawa only VHS+8 cm single.	—	—	Sangu Rose
2001	"Yakeno ga Hara" (焼け野が原, Burnt Field): Released on same day as Sangu Rose.	12	55,000	Sangu Rose
2006	"Onsoku Punch" (音速パンチ, Speed of Sound Punch)	5	80,000	Zancyan
2006	"Hi no Teri Nagara Ame no Furu" (陽の照りながら雨の降る, Rain Falls While the Sun Shines)	4	48,000	Zancyan
2007	"Dugong no Mieru Oka" (ジュゴンの見える丘, The Hill Where Dugong Can Be Seen): September Okinawan release, November all-Japan release.	14	32,000	—
2009	"Cocco-san no Daidokoro CD" (こっこさんの台所ＣＤ, Cocco's Kitchen CD): Four season-themed EP with lead track "Kinuzure."	6	18,000	Emerald
2010	"Nirai Kanai"	20	12,000	Emerald

=== Cocco-chan to Shigeru-kun ===
Cocco-chan to Shigeru-kun (こっこちゃんとしげるくん, Miss Cocco & Mr. Shigeru) is a prototype of Singer Songer, and the member doesn't change.

Year	Album details
2004	Sing a Song (No Music, No Love Life): Single; Released: November 23, 2004; Label: Tower Records (limited release); Formats: CD

=== Singer Songer ===
Singer Songer is a musical group consists of five musicians, featuring Cocco as a lead singer.

Year	Album details
2005	Shoka Rin-Rin (初花凛々, The dignified first bloom of flowers): Single; Released: May 25, 2005; Label: Speedstar Records; Formats: CD
2005	Barairo Pop (ばらいろポップ, Rose color Pop): Album; Released: June 29, 2005; Label: Speedstar Records; Formats: CD

== Videography ==
=== Music video compilations ===
Year	Album details	Notes
2001	Otanoshimi Hizō Video + Zen Single Clip = Kei Jū Roku Kyokushū (お楽しみ秘蔵ビデオ+全シングルクリップ=計16曲集, Pleasure Treasure Video + All Single Clips = 16 Planned Song Collection): Released: September 5, 2001; Label: Victor Entertainment (VIBL-37); Formats: VHS, DVD	Includes the music videos of singles.; Released on same day as Best + Ura Best + Mihappyōkyokushū.
2011	Cocco Inspired movies: Released: June 8, 2011; Label: Victor Entertainment; Formats: DVD	Contains the videos which the video creators inspired by the Cocco's songs made and was shown on Ustream for a limited time.; Released to aid the disaster victims of the Tohoku earthquake.
2011	"The Best Clip Shū" (ザ・ベストクリップ集, The best clip collection): Released: December 21, 2011; Label: Victor Entertainment; Formats: DVD	Best of music crips of Cocco associated with the album "The Best Ban".

=== Concert tour videos ===
Year	Album details	Notes
2008	"Kira-Kira Live Tour 2007/2008 ~Final at Nippon Budokan 2 Days~" (きらきら Live Tour 2007/2008 〜Final at 日本武道館 2 Days〜): Released: March 26, 2008; Label: Victor Entertainment; Formats: DVD	Contains Kira-Kira Live Tour, shot live from Nippon Budokan.; The first day is the band performance and the second day is the acoustic live.; Limited Edition includes special DVD
2011	Emerald Tour 2010: Released: April 13, 2011; Label: Victor Entertainment; Formats: DVD	Contains Emerald Tour 2010, shot live in Tokyo on November 11, 2010.; Limited Edition includes key case and clear box.

=== Documentaries ===
Year	Album details	Notes
2003	Heaven's Hell: Released: December 24, 2003; Label: Victor Entertainment (VIZL-103); Formats: VHS, DVD	Contains "Gomi Zero Daisakusen" (ゴミゼロ大作戦, Operation Zero Garbage) broadcast on TBS "NEWS23" and Ryukyu Broadcasting Corporation "Ryū no Hige."; Limited Edition featured bonus 12 cm CD "Heaven's hell".
2009	Daijōbu de Aru Yōni: Cocco Owaranai Tabi (大丈夫であるように -Cocco 終らない旅-, So I Can Be Alright: Cocco's Endless Journey): Released: November 18, 2009; Label: Victor Entertainment (VIZL-352); Formats: DVD	Documentary following Kira-Kira Live Tour.; Released in theaters on December 13, 2008.; Limited Edition featured bonus 12 cm CD Tori no Uta (鳥の歌, Song of the Birds) & photobook.

== Filmography ==
=== Movies ===
Year	Film Name	Character Name	Film director
2008	Daijōbu de Aru Yōni: Cocco Owaranai Tabi (大丈夫であるように -Cocco 終らない旅-, So I Can Be Alright: Cocco's Endless Journey)	(documentary)	Hirokazu Kore-eda
2011	Kotoko	Kotoko (琴子)	Shinya Tsukamoto
2016	A Bride for Rip Van Winkle	Mashiro Satonaka (里中 真白)	Shunji Iwai

== Bibliography ==
Title	Original Publication Date	Publisher	Category	Book sources
南の島の星の砂; Minami no Shima no Hoshi no Suna; Star Sands in the South Ocean	September 27, 2002	Kawade Shobō Shinsha	Picture book	ISBN 978-4-309-26584-1
南の島の恋の歌; Minami no Shima no Koi no Uta; Love Songs from the South Ocean	August 15, 2004	Kawade Shobō Shinsha	Picture book	ISBN 978-4-309-26769-2
8.15 Okinawa Cocco	December 21, 2006	The NHK publication, photographer: nanaco	Photo-book	ISBN 978-4-14-081161-0
想い事。 Omoi Goto. Thoughts.	August 15, 2007	The Mainichi Newspapers	Essays and photos	ISBN 978-4-620-31826-4
大丈夫であるように -Cocco 終らない旅- Daijōbu de Aru Yōni: Cocco Owaranai Tabi; So I Can Be Alright: Cocco's Endless Journey	December 5, 2008	Poplar Publishing, photographer: nanaco	Photo-book	ISBN 978-4-591-10719-5
こっこさんの台所; Cocco-san no Daidokoro; Miss Cocco's Kitchen	August 15, 2009	Gentosha	Essays and recipes	ISBN 978-4-344-01717-7
ポロメリア; Poromeria; Plumeria	May 26, 2010	Gentosha	Novel	ISBN 978-4-344-01835-8
