= Ya-kyim =

Japanese musical group

- Origin: Shibuya, Tokyo, Japan
- Genres: Pop; hip hop; R&B
- Years active: 2005–2012
- Labels: Victor Entertainment; 2005–2007; Warner Music Japan; 2008–2012; LesPros Entertainment
- Members: Miku; Alisa; Yurie
- Website: ya-kyim.jp

Ya-kyim (ヤキーム; yakīmu) is a Japanese R&B and hip hop group. The group consists of one MC, Miku, and two singers, Alisa and Yurie. Ya-kyim disbanded on 31 December 2012.

== Background ==
Miku, Alisa, and Yurie have been friends since childhood. Together in 1999, they participated as dancers in Japan's largest hip-hop-based gathering, B Boy Park, and it was also around that time that they began working as performers. They stayed active in Shibuya and officially became Ya-kyim in 2002, returning to the scene of B Boy Park with a live performance.

=== Debut and Victor Entertainment (2005–2007) ===
Their professional debut on the music scene was in 2005 with the single "Clap 'n Clap" with Victor Entertainment. However, they had also created music a year before their debut, contributing the song "Woo, Woo, Wow" to a mix CD by DJ Kaori.

At the beginning of their career, Ya-kyim appeared in street fashion popularized by hip hop culture, often performing in music videos with tilted hats and baggy clothing. However, around the time of release of the single "Beauty x Beauty", their appearance undertook a drastic change to a more adult, feminine look to coincide with their coming-of-age. Their music also shifted styles, showcasing a more mature sound.

=== Warner Music Japan (2008–2012) ===
Towards the end of 2007, the group left Victor Entertainment and joined Warner Music Japan. In November 2007, Ya-kyim performed a cover version of Can't Help but Wait by Trey Songz. Their official website marked this as an "answer song" to the original. The group also performed live with Trey Songz at various venues in Japan.

The group's first single with Warner Music Japan, Super Looper, was released on May 28, 2008, and was the theme song for TV Asahi drama "Kimi hannin janai yo ne?" (キミ犯人じゃないよね？- You Aren't a Criminal, Are You?)

On December 3, 2008, Ya-kyim released a single as part of a "Respect" project where the group collaborated with a variety of artists as a tribute, including Kome Kome Club, Seamo, Spontania, Dohzi-T, and HI-D. The group performed a cover of Kome Kome Club's song "Kimi ga Iru Dake de" and created new tracks with the other artists.

On July 8, 2009, the group released "Tabun Kitto/Happy Face (love version)," a double A-side single. The cover of the single's limited edition and the music video for "Tabun Kitto" feature Popteen models Kumiki and Marimo-chan. The first A-side, "Tabun Kitto," was the ending theme for the NTV music program Music Fighter for the month of July.

Ya-kyim's first album on Warner Music Japan and fourth album overall, Happy! Enjoy! Fresh! was announced on July 15, 2009. The album has fourteen tracks and features artists such as Pes from Rip Slyme and Cimba, as well as Seamo, Spontania, Dohzi-T, and HI-D from the group's earlier "Respect" project single. It also features the original version of the song "Happy Face" from the group's "Tabun Kitto/Happy Face" single. The album was set to be released on August 19, 2009.

Ya-kyim disbanded in the end of 2012, where the group made statement, rather than musical direction, it was about their own direction that differs. They decided to pursue their own dreams fully.

== Discography ==
=== Albums ===
- [2006.03.08] Still Only One
- [2006.08.02] Keep Ya Style
- [2007.03.07] Can Ya Feel?
- [2009.08.19] Happy! Enjoy! Fresh!
- [2010.07.28] Hip! Up! Pop!
- [2012.02.29] Here

=== Singles ===
- [2005.04.20] "Clap 'n Clap"
- [2005.08.03] "Happy the Globe"
- [2005.12.07] "Elec-Trick"
- [2006.11.01] "Beauty x Beauty"
- [2007.02.07] "Superstar"
- [2007.08.01] "20: Twenty"
- [2008.05.28] "Super Looper"
- [2008.12.03] "君がいるだけで" (Kimi ga Iru Dake de)/さぁ行こう! (Sa Ikou!)
- [2009.07.08] "たぶんきっと" (Tabun Kitto)/Happy Face (Love Version)
- [2010.11.24] "Bakurock: 未来の輪郭線" (Bakurock: Mirai no Rinkakusen)

=== Compilations ===
- [2004.09.29] DJ Kaori's "Ride" into the Party (Track 16: "Woo, Woo, Wow")
- [2006.09.27] 'E'qual's 7 Days (Track 5: "Dress Code")
