= Nirai Kanai (Cocco song) =

Single by Cocco

from the album Emerald
- B-side: "Yagi no Sanpo"
- Released: June 9, 2010
- Genre: J-pop, pop rock
- Length: 5:09
- Label: Speedstar Records
- Songwriter(s): Cocco
- Producer(s): Takamune Negishi, Cocco

Cocco singles chronology
"Cocco-san no Daidokoro CD" (2009)	"Nirai Kanai" (2010)

"Nirai Kanai" (ニライカナイ) is a song by Japanese singer-songwriter Cocco, that was released as the lead single for her seventh original album, Emerald on June 9, 2010.

== Writing ==
The song is a mid-tempo rock song, backed with Okinawan festival taiko drums. Nirai Kanai is a reference to the mythical utopia/origin of life in Ryukyuan religion. The song's lyrics reference this place, in the context of an Okinawan festival. The Dragon God of the sea is referenced, and the song also talks about how if good people exist in the world, bad people must also exist (in the lines "If there are praying people, there are also burning people" and "the rain also falls on criminals"). Other than "Nirai Kanai," several Okinawan phrases are in the lyrics: kana (愛, "love"), nuchi dou takara (命どう 宝, "treasure this life"), tiichi taachi (てぃーち たーち, "one, two") and a sentence in Okinawan: ayami wa tunganin nu uin fuyun (雨は罪人の上にも降る, "the rain also falls on criminals").

Cocco wrote the B-side, "Yagi no Sanpo," as a Christmas present to film director Ryūgo Nakamura, after he wrote her a letter expressing how much he enjoyed her music.

== Promotion ==
"Nirai Kanai" was used as the ending theme song for the TV Tokyo music show Japan Countdown. "Yagi no Sanpo" was used as the theme song of then 14-year-old director Ryūgo Nakamura's debut feature-length film Yagi no Bōken.

== Track listing ==
All tracks are written by Cocco

No.	Title	Arranger	Length
1.	"Nirai Kanai" (ニライカナイ)	Takamune Negishi, Cocco	5:09
2.	"Yagi no Sanpo" (やぎの散歩 "Goat Walk")	Takamune Negishi, Cocco	4:00
Total length:			9:09

== Chart rankings ==
Chart	Peak position
Billboard Japan Hot 100	4
Billboard Adult Contemporary Airplay	6
Oricon Weekly singles	20

=== Reported sales ===
Chart	Amount
Oricon physical sales	12,000
