= Winding Road (Ayaka and Kobukuro song) =

Single by Ayaka and Kobukuro

from the album Sing to the Sky
- Released: February 28, 2007
- Genre: J-pop; R&B
- Length: 4:58
- Label: Cube Loves Music!
- Songwriters: Kentarō Kobuchi; Shunsuke Kuroda; Ayaka

Ayaka singles chronology
"Mikazuki" (2006)	"Winding Road" (2007)	"Jewelry Day" (2007)

Kobukuro singles chronology
"Kimi to Iu na no Tsubasa" (2006)	"Winding Road" (2007)	"Tsubomi" (2007)

"Winding Road" is a first collaboration single between Ayaka and duo Kobukuro.

== Information ==
This single was used in Japanese commercials to promote the Nissan Cube. The commercial made its first television airing on March 1, 2007. The single was sold for ¥555 or roughly $4.50, an unusually low price for a physical single, although this price may be attributed to the single containing only 2 tracks as most singles contain 4. In its first week, the single placed 2nd on the Oricon weekly singles listing.

== Track listing ==
All tracks are written by Ayaka, Kentaro Kobuchi, and Shunsuke Kuroda.

No.	Title	Length
1.	"Winding Road"	4:58
2.	"Winding Road" (Instrumental)	4:58

== Charts ==
Charts (2007)	Peak position
Oricon Singles Chart	2

=== Sales and certifications ===
Chart	Amount
Oricon physical sales	359,000
RIAJ physical certification	Gold
