= Love (Ai Otsuka) =

Love ラブ

Background information
- Birth name: 大塚 愛 (Ōtsuka Ai)
- Also known as: Ai Otsuka
- Born: September 9, 1982 (age 42)
- Genres: Pop
- Years active: 2007–present
- Labels: Locomusic (a division of the Avex Music Group (AMG))
- Website: locomusic.jp/love

Love (ラブ) (stylized as LOVE) is a fictional female bunny character and singer created by Japanese singer Ai Otsuka. Love was to star in an album originally titled I canChu♥ and a promotional music video from I canChu♥, but the release was changed to a single and titled "Love no Theme" before it was released on April 11, 2007. Otsuka released a second single under Love titled "White Choco" on November 21, 2007. On November 18, 2009, the debut mini-album of Love was released, titled Love It.

== Description ==
According to the official profile, Love is a female bunny weighing 22 kilograms with a height of 99 centimeters. Her speech consists of few words. She is often shy and lonely, but acts restless. Love lacks the ability to jump and has slow movement, and her hobbies include turning over, being idle, and playing tricks. Love also likes cheap candy such as milk wafers, and dislikes people without substance, dentists, and non-organic vegetables.

== Discography ==
=== Albums ===
| Year | Information | Oricon weekly peak position |
|---|---|---|
| 2009 | Love It: Released: November 18, 2009; Format: CD, CD+DVD, digital download; Label: Avex Trax (AVCD-23956, AVCD-23955/B) | 82 |

=== Singles ===
| Year | Title | Release date | Oricon Charts | | | Album |
| Year | Title | Release date | Daily | Weekly | Sales | Album |
|---|---|---|---|---|---|---|
| 2007 | "Love no Theme" | April 11 | 9 | 22 | 8,537 | Love It |
| 2007 | "White Choco" | November 21 | 34 | 70 | 2,736 | Love It |
