= Peach/Heart =

"Peach / Heart"

Single by Ai Otsuka

from the album Love Piece
- Released: July 25, 2007
- Recorded: 2007
- Genre: J-Pop
- Label: avex trax
- Songwriter: Ai Otsuka

Ai Otsuka singles chronology
| "Chu-Lip" (2007) | "Peach" / "Heart" (2007) | "Pocket" (2007) |

Love singles chronology
| "White Choco" (2007) |

Alternative cover
- The CD Cover

"Peach/Heart" is Ai Otsuka's 15th (16th overall) single released under the Avex Trax label. It was released on 25 July 2007 and was her second (third) single to be released in 2007.

The first A-side, Peach is an upbeat song said to "give the feeling of the refreshing summer sky" and is the theme song of the new summer 2007 drama, Hanazakari no Kimitachi e, starring Maki Horikita, Shun Oguri, and Ikuta Toma. In contrast, the second A-side, Heart is a medium-tempo track which has a "nostalgic feeling". The single also features a rearranged version of the single Renai Shashin called Renai Shashin: Haru.

Promotional videos for both "Peach" and "Heart" were released.

"Peach" has been certified as being downloaded more than 1,000,000 times as a ringtone by the RIAJ, and more than 250,000 times as a full-length download to cellphones.

== Track listing ==
All tracks are written by Ai Otsuka.

CD
| No. | Title | Arranger(s) | Length |
|---|---|---|---|
| 1. | "Peach" | Ai×Ikoman |
| 2. | "Heart" | Ai×Ikoman |
| 3. | "Ren’ai Shashin -Haru- (恋愛写真 -春-; Love Photograph -Spring-)" | Ai×Ikoman |
| 4. | "Peach" (Instrumental) | Ai×Ikoman |
| 5. | "Heart" (Instrumental) | Ai×Ikoman |

DVD
| No. | Title | Length |
|---|---|---|
| 1. | "Peach" (Music video) |

== Charts ==
Oricon sales chart (Japan)

| Release | Chart | Peak position | First week sales | Sales total |
|---|---|---|---|---|
| July 25, 2007 | Oricon Daily Chart | 1 | | |
| July 25, 2007 | Oricon Weekly Chart | 1 | 68,346 | 169,245 |
| July 25, 2007 | Oricon Monthly Chart | 2 | | |
| July 25, 2007 | Oricon Yearly Chart | 38 | | |
