= Okaeri =

2008 Japanese song

- Cover of Okaeri

Single by Ayaka

from the album Sing to the Sky
- Released: May 14, 2008
- Recorded: 2008
- Genre: J-Pop
- Label: Warner Music Japan
- Songwriters: Yoshihiko Nishio, Ayaka

Ayaka singles chronology
"Te o Tsunagō / Ai o Utaō" (2007)	"Okaeri" (2008)	"Anata to" (2008)

Okaeri (おかえり) is the 9th single from Ayaka. It was released on May 14, 2008.

== Overview ==
Okaeri is used as the theme song for the drama series, Zettai Kareshi. Ayaka was asked by Yuu Watase, the manga artist of Zettai Kareshi, to create a theme song. She wrote the song with her music producer after reading the whole series. First press contains a special photo card.

== Track listing ==
All lyrics are written by Ayaka; all music is composed by Yoshihiko Nishio, Ayaka.

CD
No.	Title	Arranger(s)	Length
1.	""Okaeri" (おかえり)"	Akihisa Matsuura
2.	""Meiro" (迷路)"	Susumu Nishikawa
3.	""Te wo Tsunagō" (手をつなごう)" (2007/12/20 Nippon Budokan Hall Live ver.)
4.	""Okaeri" (おかえリ)" (Instrumental)
5.	""Meiro" (迷路)" (Instrumental)
