= Minna Sora no Shita =

Single by Ayaka

from the album Ayaka's History 2006–2009
- B-side: "Arigatō"
- Released: July 8, 2009
- Recorded: 2009
- Genre: J-Pop
- Label: Warner Music Japan
- Songwriter(s): Ayaka

Ayaka singles chronology
| "Yume wo Mikata ni / Koi Kogarete Mita Yume" (2008) | "Minna Sora no Shita" (2009) | "Beautiful/Chīsana Ashiato" (2013) |

Minna Sora no Shita (みんな空の下, Everyone Under the Sky) is the 12th single from Ayaka. It was released on July 8, 2009.

== Overview ==
Featuring the A-side, "Minna Sora no Shita", the single includes the B-side "Arigatō" and a live version of "Koi Kogarete Mita Yume" that was recorded from her live performance on April 22 at Budokan.

This is Ayaka's final single release for the foreseeable future before she focuses on her marriage with Hiro Mizushima and her Graves' disease health conditions.

== Track list ==
All tracks are written by Ayaka

CD
| No. | Title | Arranger(s) | Length |
|---|---|---|---|
| 1. | "Minna Sora no Shita (みんな空の下)" | Akihisa Matsuura |
| 2. | "Arigatō (ありがとう)" | Seiji Kameda |
| 3. | "Koi Kogarete Mita Yume (恋焦がれて見た夢)" (2009/4/22 Nippon Budokan Hall Live ver.) | Ritsuko Honma |
| 4. | "Minna Sora no Shita (みんな空の下)" (Instrumental) |
| 5. | "Arigatō (ありがとう)" (Instrumental) |

== Charts ==
Oricon Sales Chart (Japan)

| Release | Chart | Peak position | First week sales | Sales total |
|---|---|---|---|---|
| July 8, 2009 | Oricon Daily Singles Chart | 3 | | 34,953 |
| July 8, 2009 | Oricon Weekly Singles Chart | 4 | 22,620 | 34,953 |
| July 8, 2009 | Oricon Monthly Singles Chart | 13 | | 34,953 |
