= Clap & Love/Why =

"Clap & Love / Why"

Single by Ayaka
- Released: September 5, 2007
- Genre: Pop
- Length: 23:50
- Label: Warner Music Japan
- Songwriter(s): Yoshihiko Nishio, Ayaka

Ayaka singles chronology
"Jewelry Day" (2007)	"Clap & Love / Why" (2007)	"For Today" (2007)

"Clap & Love / Why" is the 6th single from Ayaka and her first double A-side single.

== Overview ==
The single was released in three pressings, the first included a "Final Fantasy Crisis Core" sticker, the second came with a regular CD single and the third with a CD+DVD release renamed "Why / Clap & Love". "Clap & Love" was being used as the opening theme to the comedic J-Drama Jigoku no Sata mo Yome Shidai. "Why" was used as the theme song to the game Crisis Core: Final Fantasy VII.

== Tracks ==
All lyrics are written by Ayaka; all music is composed by Yoshihiko Nishio, Ayaka

CD
No.	Title	Arranger(s)	Length
1.	"Clap & Love"	Akihisa Matsuura
2.	"Why"	L.O.E
3.	"Peace loving people" (Live Ver.)
4.	"Clap & Love" (Instrumental)
5.	"Why" (Instrumental)

DVD (Limited Edition only)
No.	Title	Length
1.	"Why" (Music video)
2.	"Why" (Crisis Core -Final Fantasy- Ver.)

== Charts ==
=== Oricon sales chart (Japan) ===
Release	Chart	Peak position	Sales total	Chart run
5 September 2007	Oricon Daily Singles Chart	3		
5 September 2007	Oricon Weekly Singles Chart	5	58,103	4+
5 September 2007	Oricon Monthly Singles Chart	17		
5 September 2007	Oricon Yearly Singles Chart	TBA		
