= First Message =

Studio album by Ayaka
- Released: November 1, 2006
- Genre: J-pop
- Length: 55:47
- Label: Warner Music Japan
- Producer: Nishio Yoshihiko; Ayaka

Ayaka chronology
First Message (2006)	Sing to the Sky (2008)

First Message is the debut album from Japanese singer Ayaka.

== Background ==
After a year of releasing singles and music videos, the album was originally for an early September release but was pushed back to allow Ayaka's single, Mikazuki, to correspond with the album release. It entered the Oricon charts at number one. The album has also been released on iTunes in Japan and other countries, including the United States.

== Commercial performance ==
The album debuted at #1 on the Oricon Albums Chart with first week sales of approximately 350,580 copies. This became the highest first week sales of a female soloist's debut album since Mika Nakashima's True, released nearly four years prior. First message sold 711,299 copies by the end of 2006, making it the 13th best-selling album of the fiscal year.

First message managed to sell an additional 406,290 copies by the end of the following year, making it the 22nd best-selling album in Japan of 2007. The album surpassed the million-selling mark during its 24th week on the charts, on April 23, 2007, making it the first time in three years since Avril Lavigne's Let Go that a female solo singer achieved a million-seller in Japan with her first album. First message was certified Million by RIAJ for shipping around 1 million copies.

Her debut album re-entered the charts at #148 in 2009, and it peaked at #72 on April 15, 2009, Weekly Chart.

== Track listing ==
All lyrics are written by Ayaka.

CD
No.	Title	Music	Arranger(s)	Length
1.	"Start to 0 (Love)"	Yoshihiko Nishio	L.O.E
2.	"Real Voice"	Yoshihiko Nishio	L.O.E
3.	"Sha la la"	Yoshihiko Nishio, Ayaka	L.O.E
4.	""Blue Days" (ブルーデイズ; lit. "Blue Days")"	Yoshihiko Nishio	L.O.E
5.	"I Believe"	Yoshihiko Nishio, Ayaka	L.O.E
6.	"Stay with Me"	Yoshihiko Nishio, Ayaka	L.O.E
7.	"Melody"	Yoshihiko Nishio	L.O.E
8.	""Kimi no Power to Otona no Furi" (君のパワーと大人のフリ; lit. "Your Power and an Adult's Inseparability")"	Yoshihiko Nishio, Ayaka	L.O.E
9.	""Eien no Monogatari" (永遠の物語; lit. "Eternal Story")"	Yoshihiko Nishio	L.O.E
10.	""Toki wo Modoshite" (時を戻して; lit. "Turning Back Time")"	Yoshihiko Nishio, Ayaka	Hiroshi Uesugi
11.	"1・2・3・4"	Yoshihiko Nishio	L.O.E
12.	"Story"	Yoshihiko Nishio, Ayaka	L.O.E
13.	""Lailalai" (ライラライ; lit. "Rairarai")"	Yoshihiko Nishio	L.O.E
14.	""Mikazuki" (三日月; lit. "Crescent Moon")"	Yoshihiko Nishio, Ayaka	L.O.E
15.	"message"	Ayaka	Ayaka

== Charts ==
Oricon Sales Chart (Japan)

Release	Album chart	Peak position	Debut sales	Sales total
November 1, 2006	Daily Chart	1		1,201,732
November 1, 2006	Weekly Chart	1	350,580	1,201,732
November 1, 2006	Monthly Chart	1		1,201,732
November 1, 2006	Yearly Chart (2006)	13	711,000	1,201,732
November 1, 2006	Yearly Chart (2007)	22	338,000	1,201,732
November 1, 2006	Yearly Chart (2008)	126	-	1,201,732
