= Anata to =

Single by Ayaka and Kobukuro
- Released: September 24, 2008
- Genre: J-Pop
- Label: Cube Loves Music!
- Songwriters: Ayaka, Kentaro Kobuchi, and Shunsuke Kuroda.

Ayaka and Kobukuro singles chronology
"Okaeri" (2008)	"Anata to" (2008)	"Yume wo Mikata ni / Koi Kogarete Mita Yume" (2009)

"Anata to" (あなたと) is a second collaboration single between Ayaka and Kobukuro.

== Overview ==
This single is used in Japanese commercials to promote the Nissan Cube since July 4, 2008. It was released under the Cube Loves Music! label, a joint venture of Warner Music Japan and Nissan.

== Track listing ==
All tracks are written by Ayaka, Kentaro Kobuchi, and Shunsuke Kuroda.

CD
No.	Title	Length
1.	"Anata to (あなたと)"
2.	"Anata to (あなたと)" (Instrumental)
