= Ren'ai Shashin =

"恋愛写真" "Ren'ai Shashin" / "Love Photograph"

Single by Ai Otsuka

from the album Love Piece
- Released: October 25, 2006
- Recorded: 2006
- Genre: J-Pop
- Label: avex trax AVCD-31065/B (Japan, CD+DVD); AVCD-31066 (Japan, CD)
- Songwriter(s): Ai Otsuka

Ai Otsuka singles chronology
"Yumekui" (2006)	"恋愛写真" "Ren'ai Shashin" / "Love Photograph" (2006)	"Chu-Lip" (2007)

Alternative cover
- The CD + DVD Cover

"Ren'ai Shashin" (恋愛写真, Love Photograph) is the 13th single by Japanese singer Ai Otsuka, released on the Avex Trax label. It is also her third and final single released in 2006.

The ballad was used as the theme song of the movie Tada, Kimi o Aishiteru. The title of the movie was originally Heavenly Forest, but was changed to a phrase from the song's lyrics after the director listened to the song.

The b-side, "Hanikami Jane", an upbeat song, was used in a television commercial for Look: a la mode chocolate. The third track is a live version of "Haneari Tamago", a song originally on Otsuka's 3rd album Love Cook.

The single debuted at number 2 during its first week, selling 77,570 copies and making it Otsuka's highest debut sales of the year. "Ren'ai Shashin" was second only to Kisarazu Cat's Eye's "Seaside Byebye". It sold a total of 129,855 copies in 2006, making it the 75th best-selling single of the year.

== Track listing ==
All tracks are written by Ai Otsuka.

CD
No.	Title	Arranger(s)	Length
1.	"Ren'ai Shashin (恋愛写真; Love Photograph)"	Ai×Ikoman, Strings arrangement： Ittetsu Gen	5:00
2.	"Hanikami Jane (ハニカミ ジェーン; Shy Jane)"	Ai×Ikoman, Strings arrangement： Mio Okamura& Ikoman	4:22
3.	"Haneari Tamago (羽ありたまご; Feathered Egg)" (Live version)	Ai×Ikoman	5:27
4.	"Ren'ai Shashin (恋愛写真; Love Photograph)" (Instrumental)	Ai×Ikoman, Strings arrangement： Ittetsu Gen	4:58
5.	"Hanikami Jane (ハニカミ ジェーン; Shy Jane)" (Instrumental)	Ai×Ikoman, Strings arrangement： Mio Okamura& Ikoman	4:20
Total length:			24:06

DVD
No.	Title	Length
1.	"Ren'ai Shashin (恋愛写真; Love Photograph)" (Music video)

== Live performances ==
- 25 September 2006 – Hey! Hey! Hey! Special
- 20 October 2006 – Music Station
- 20 October 2006 – PopJam
- 26 October 2006 – Utaban
- 22 November 2006 – Best Hit Kyodai
- 29 November 2006 – Best Artist
- 7 December 2006 – FNS Music Festival
- 22 December 2006 – Music Station Super Live 2006
- 29 December 2006 – Sakigake Ongaku Banzuke - "Frienger" + "Ren'ai Shashin"
- 30 December 2006 – 48th Japan Record Awards
- 31 December 2006 – Kouhaku Uta Gassen

== Charts ==
Oricon Sales Chart (Japan)

Release	Chart	Peak position	First week sales	Sales total
October 25, 2006	Oricon Daily Charts	1		
October 25, 2006	Oricon Weekly Charts	2	77,570 copies	147,975 copies
October 25, 2006	Oricon Monthly Charts	3		
October 25, 2006	Oricon Yearly Charts	75		
