= White Choco =

"White choco"

Single by Love
- Released: November 21, 2007
- Genre: J-Pop
- Label: avex trax
- Songwriter: Ai Otsuka

Love singles chronology
"Love no Theme" (2007)	"White choco" (2007)

Ai Otsuka singles chronology
"Pocket" (2007)

Alternative cover
- The CD + DVD Cover

"White choco" is Ai Otsuka's second (18th overall) single under the avex trax label under her pen name Love, which was released on November 21, 2007.

"White Choco" is the second single that Ai has released about a bunny named Love and under her pen name Love. "White Choco" is a previously unreleased song on her "Momo no hanabira" promotional disc originally entitled "Whiteチョコ" (White Chocolate; White Choko). The single peaked at 78 on the Oricon weekly chart and charted for two weeks.

== Track listing ==
- CD
1. White choco
2. White choco -instrumental-
- DVD
1. White choco [Music Clip]

== Charts ==
Oricon Sales Chart (Japan)

Release	Chart	Peak Position	First Week Sales	Sales Total	Chart Run
November 21, 2007	Oricon Daily Charts	34			
November 21, 2007	Oricon Weekly Charts	70	2,057	2,736	2 weeks
November 21, 2007	Oricon Monthly Charts				
November 21, 2007	Oricon Yearly Charts				
