= Melody (Sounds Real) =

"Melody: Sounds Real"

Single by Ayaka

from the album First Message
- B-side: "Blue Days"
- Released: 17 May 2006
- Genre: J-pop
- Label: Warner Music Japan
- Songwriters: Yoshihiko Nishio, Ayaka

Ayaka singles chronology
"I Believe" (2006)	"Melody: Sounds Real" (2006)	"Real Voice" (2006)

"Melody: Sounds Real" is the second single from Ayaka.

The B-side track, "Blue Days", was used as an insert song for the Japanese dorama suppli/supply. The single was limited to a special 50,000 copy printing and has sold 24,466 copies.

== Track listing ==
All lyrics are written by Ayaka.

CD
No.	Title	Music	Arranger(s)	Length
1.	"Melody"	Yoshihiko Nishio	L.O.E
2.	"Blue Days (ブルーデイズ)"	Yoshihiko Nishio	L.O.E
3.	"Melody -Live Version-"	Yoshihiko Nishio	Yoshihiko Nishio, L.O.E
4.	"Sha La La -Live Version-"	Yoshihiko Nishio, Ayaka	Yoshihiko Nishio, L.O.E
5.	"Blue Days -Live Version-"	Yoshihiko Nishio	Yoshihiko Nishio, L.O.E

== Charts ==
Chart	Peak position	Sales total
Oricon Daily Singles Chart	11	
Oricon Weekly Singles Chart	14	24,466
