= Te o Tsunagō/Ai o Utaō =

"Te o Tsunagō / Ai o Utaō"
- Cover of Te o Tsunagō / Ai o Utaō

Single by Ayaka
- Released: March 5, 2008
- Genre: J-pop
- Length: 25:09
- Label: Warner Music Japan
- Songwriters: Yoshihiko Nishio, Ayaka

Ayaka singles chronology
"For Today" (2007)	"Te o Tsunagō / Ai o Utaō" (2008)	"Okaeri" (2008)

Te o Tsunagō / Ai o Utaō (手をつなごう／愛を歌おう) is the 8th single from Ayaka. It was released on March 5, 2008. It peaked at number 7 on Oricon Singles Chart.

== Overview ==
Te o Tsunagō was used as a theme song for the film Doraemon: Nobita and the Green Giant Legend. Since December 2007, Ai o Utaō is used for commercials for BEAUTÉ de KOSÉ's "ESPRIQUE PRECIOUS".

== Track ==
All lyrics are written by Ayaka; all music is composed by Yoshihiko Nishio, Ayaka.

CD
No.	Title	Arranger(s)	Length
1.	"Te o Tsunagō (手をつなごう)"	L.O.E
2.	"Ai o Utaō (愛を歌おう)"	Tomoji Sogawa
3.	"Mikazuki (三日月)" (2007/12/20 Nippon Budokan Hall Live ver.)
4.	"Te o Tsunagō (手をつなごう)" (Instrumental)
5.	"Ai o Utaō (愛を歌おう)" (Instrumental)
