= Real Voice =

Single by Ayaka
- Released: 19 July 2006
- Genre: J-pop
- Length: 11:41
- Songwriters: Yoshihiko Nishio, Ayaka

Ayaka singles chronology
"Melody: Sounds Real" (2006)	"Real Voice" (2006)	"Mikazuki" (2006)

"Real Voice" is the third single from female Japanese artist, Ayaka. The song was used as the ending theme to the J-Drama, Suppli. The single reached a peak of eleven on the Oricon weekly singles chart.

== Track listing ==
All lyrics are written by Ayaka; all music is composed by Yoshihiko Nishio.

CD
No.	Title	Arranger(s)	Length
1.	"Real Voice"	L.O.E	4:00
2.	"Peace Loving People"	Tomoo Ishizuka	3:45
3.	"Real Voice" (instrumental)

== Charts ==
Oricon Sales Chart (Japan)

Release	Chart	Peak position	Sales total	Chart run
28 February 2007	Oricon Weekly Singles Chart	11	15,387	
28 February 2007	Oricon Yearly Singles Chart	171	51,121	
