= Jewelry Day =

Single by Ayaka
- Released: July 4, 2007
- Genre: J-pop
- Label: Warner Music Japan
- Songwriters: Yoshihiko Nishio, Ayaka

Ayaka singles chronology
"Winding Road" (2007)	"Jewelry Day" (2007)	"Clap & Love/Why" (2007)

Jewelry Day is the 5th single released from the Japanese singer Ayaka.

== Information ==
Jewelry Day was released on July 4, 2007. The title track was used as the ending theme to a Japanese movie entitled Last Love. Ayaka performed the song, among many others, at Live Earth Japan on July 7, 2007. On its first day on the Oricon daily singles chart, the single reached the 4th position and would later climb to the 2nd position the next day. In its first week, the single claimed the 2nd spot on the top ten weekly singles.

== Track listing ==
All lyrics are written by Ayaka.

CD
No.	Title	Music	Arranger(s)	Length
1.	"Jewelry Day"	Yoshihiko Nishio	L.O.E
2.	"I'm alone"	Yoshihiko Nishio, Ayaka	L.O.E
3.	"Start to 0 (Love)" (Acoustic Ver.)	Yoshihiko Nishio	L.O.E
4.	"Jewelry day" (Instrumental)

== Charts ==
Chart	Peak position	Sales total
Oricon Daily Singles Chart	2	
Oricon Weekly Singles Chart	2	73,290
