= Mikazuki (song) =

2006 single by Ayaka

Single by Ayaka

from the album First Message
- B-side: "Kimi no Kiss de..."; "Yume no Kakera"
- Released: September 27, 2006
- Recorded: 2006
- Genre: J-pop
- Length: 4:40
- Label: Warner Music Japan
- Songwriter(s): Ayaka, Yoshihiko Nishio
- Producer(s): Ayaka, Yoshihiko Nishio

Ayaka singles chronology
"Real Voice" (2006)	"Mikazuki" (2006)	"Jewelry Day" (2007)

"Mikazuki" (三日月, "Crescent Moon") is the fourth single from Ayaka, released on September 27, 2006.

== Information ==
"Mikazuki" was originally supposed to be Ayaka's first single but was pushed back. A music video was produced before Ayaka's first single, "I Believe", was even released. The song was used as a commercial song for a chain of Japanese record stores and later used for a drama known as @Human. When the single was released, it became Ayaka's first number-one single.

== Chart performance ==
In April 2009, when the Recording Industry Association of Japan created the RIAJ Digital Track Chart "Mikazuki" debuted at No. 40. The song charted below the Top 40s until the release of her compilation album Ayaka's History 2006–2009 on September 23, 2009, when it peaked at No. 18. On the Billboard Japan Hot 100, the song debuted at No. 60. It was certified "platinum" and a million seller by the RIAJ.

== Track listing ==
All lyrics are written by Ayaka; all music is composed by Ayaka and Yoshihiko Nishio except for "Yume no Kakera" which was composed solely by Yoshihiko Nishio.

No.	Title	Arranger(s)	Length
1.	"Mikazuki"	L.O.E	4:40
2.	"Kimi no Kiss de..." (君のキスで... Kimi no Kisu de... "With Your Kiss...")	L.O.E
3.	"Yume no Kakera -Live Version-" (夢のカケラ "Pieces of Dreams")
4.	"Mikazuki" (Instrumental)	L.O.E

== Charts ==
Chart (2006)	Peak position
Oricon Weekly Chart	1
Chart (2009)	Peak position
RIAJ Digital Track Chart	18
Japan Hot 100	60

== Certifications ==
Certifications for "Mikazuki"
Region	Certification	Certified units/sales
Streaming
Japan (RIAJ)	Platinum	100,000,000^{†}
^{†} Streaming-only figures based on certification alone.

== Charice version ==
"Crescent Moon"

Single by Charice

from the album Charice
- Released: June 23, 2010
- Recorded: 2010
- Genre: Pop
- Length: 4:37
- Label: 143/Reprise/Beluga Heights
- Songwriter(s): Ayaka, Yoshihiko Nishio

In 2010, Filipino pop singer Charice, now known as Jake Zyrus, recorded an English version of the song entitled "Crescent Moon" as part of the Japanese edition of his self-titled international debut album, Charice. It was released as a promotional single in Japan on June 23, 2010 via iTunes, and is the third overall single from Charice.

No.	Title	Length
1.	"Crescent Moon"	4:37
