= Ayaka =

- 絢香
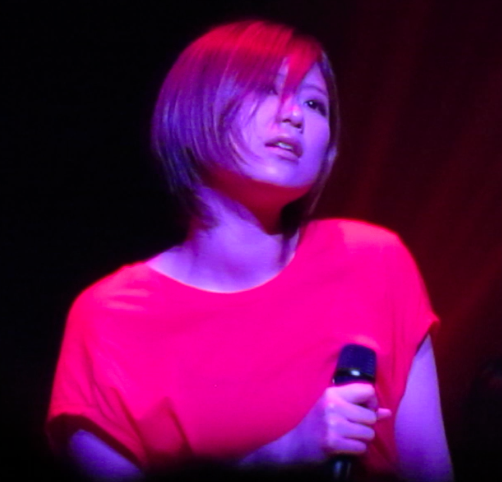
- Ayaka performing in Matsuyama during her 2012 tour
- Born: Iida Ayaka (飯田 絢香); December 18, 1987 (age 38); Moriguchi, Osaka, Japan
- Occupations: Singer; songwriter; record producer
- Years active: 2006–2009; 2011–present
- Height: 157 cm (5 ft 2 in)
- Spouse: Hiro Mizushima (m. 2009)
- Children: 2
- Musical career
- Genre: Pop
- Instrument: Vocals
- Labels: Real Note/Warner Music (2006–2010); A StAtion/Avex Group (2012–present)
- Website: room-ayaka.jp

Ayaka Iida (飯田 絢香, Iida Ayaka; born December 18, 1987), known simply by the mononym Ayaka, is a Japanese singer, songwriter and record producer formerly signed to Warner Music Japan. Born in Osaka, she moved to Tokyo to pursue a singing career. She married actor Hiro Mizushima on February 22, 2009.

== Biography ==
=== Early life ===
In the summer of 2003, Ayaka began performing live in her hometown of Osaka. In spring 2004, she started going to the music school "Voice", the principal of which is her former music producer Yoshihiko Nishio, in Fukuoka. She commuted between Osaka and Fukuoka every weekend and started to learn songwriting under the direction of Nishio. She eventually transferred to another high school in Fukuoka. The demo of songs which she produced in "Voice" was soon brought to the music industry and led to her contract with Warner Music Japan.

=== 2006 ===
In January 2006, Ayaka recorded "I Believe" as the opening theme for the Japanese drama Rondo. The full single was first released as a download-only single and went on to become one of the fastest songs to reach 1,000,000 downloads, as well as becoming the 3rd-highest-selling download debut single for a female artist.

Ayaka's second single "Melody (Sounds Real)" peaked at number 14 on the Oricon charts has gone on pass the 20,000 mark.

"Real Voice" was Ayaka's third single and was used as the ending theme to the Japanese drama Suppli. "Blue Days", the b-side from "Melody (Sounds Real)", was also used as an insert song for the show. "Real Voice" was released on July 17, 2006, and has sold over 50,000 copies.

Weeks before the scheduled release of Ayaka's debut album, "First Message", the album was cancelled. In its place, the single "Mikazuki" was released as a rerecorded version of the same song from 2005. "Mikazuki" became Ayaka's highest-charting single, selling 40,091 copies within its first week and taking the highest spot on the Oricon weekly charts, remaining in the charts for 41 weeks. The single sold over 300,000 copies.

On November 1, 2006, Ayaka's debut album, First Message, was finally released after several delays. It sold 350,580 copies within its first week, making it the highest selling album of the week as well as the highest selling debut album for a female artist in 7 years. The album went on to sell 1,202,180 copies and stayed within the top two positions on the Oricon charts for two weeks straight before being listed as the 13th highest selling album of 2006.

=== 2007 ===
On February 28, 2007, a new single was released. The song "Winding Road" was a collaboration with label-mates Kobukuro and was used to promote a new line of cars. The single reached a peak position of number 2 on the Oricon charts.

The 5th single from Ayaka was used as the ending theme to Last Love, a Japanese movie which was released one month prior to the single. Peaking at number 2, the single has since sold over 70,000 copies. Ayaka also performed "Jewelry Day", as well as many other songs, at the Japanese leg of Live Earth in Tokyo on July 7, 2007.

Ayaka's 6th single, "Why", released on September 5, was used for Crisis Core: Final Fantasy VII, a PSP game by Square Enix, as the theme song to the game. Peaking at number 5 on the Oricon charts, reported sales totalled over 65,000 copies.

In November, Ayaka released her first digital single, "For Today", which was used for a Pocky commercial. At the end of 2007 Ayaka performed "Peace Loving People (special piano version)" in the annual music show Kōhaku Uta Gassen.

=== 2008 ===
On February 29, 2008, her first starring live event, Power Of Music, was held. On March 5, 2008, Ayaka's first single of 2008, Te o Tsunagō / Ai o Utaō was released. It was a double A-side single, first track used as a theme song for the movie, Nobita and the Green Giant Legend 2008, and the second track was used for Beauté de Kosé's "Esprique Precious" commercial. Her second single of the year, "Okaeri", was released in May 2008. Okaeri was used as the theme song of the drama Zettai Kareshi. Ayaka also attended an interview after Okaeri's production with Hiro Mizushima, who was a member of the Zettai Kareshi cast. The two got on well, and began dating soon after.

Her second album, Sing to the Sky, was released on June 25, 2008. It reached number 2 on the Oricon Weekly Charts and sold over 600,000 copies.

"Anata to", the second collaboration single with Kobukuro, was released on September 24, 2008.

Ayaka sang "Okaeri" at the 59th annual Kōuhaku Uta Gassen.

=== 2009 ===
On February 22, 2009, Ayaka married Hiro Mizushima after several months of dating. On April 2, Ayaka's diagnosis of Graves' disease was made public. She announced her plans to continue singing until the end of 2009, before putting her career on hold.

On April 22, 2009, Ayaka released her second double A-side single, "Yume wo Mikata ni / Koikogarete Mita Yume". The single also include a live version of "Kimi ga Iru Kara" that was recorded from her live performance in February at Shibuya-AX. She released another single, "Minna Sora no Shita" on July 8 of the same year.

In September, a compilation album titled Ayaka's History 2006–2009 was released and contained two discs, the first disc comprising all her single tracks and the second disc comprising songs selected by fans. It sold almost 350,000 copies in its first week, the highest for a female artist of 2009, and ranked number one on the charts for two consecutive weeks. About a month and a half after its release, the album reached a million copies shipped, making it the only album by a solo artist to do so in 2009.

On November 18, 2009, Ayaka's MTV Unplugged performance, her last solo live before her hiatus, was recorded at Osaka-jō Hall. In December, Ayaka performed at the 60th Kōhaku Uta Gassen, her second consecutive year, singing "Minna Sora no Shita" as her final live performance.

=== 2010–2011 ===
Ayaka's MTV Unplugged performance was released on DVD and Blu-ray in January, the DVD edition reaching the number 2 spot on the Oricon chart.

Both Ayaka and her husband left their agency, and Ayaka's contract with Warner Music Japan ended in March. She and Mizushima both opened official Twitter pages in October.

On October 20, 2011, Ayaka announced that she would return from hiatus in 2012; her condition from her Graves' disease has improved over time. She returned with her own independent record label, A stAtion (independent of her previous label Warner). Avex Group, Japan's biggest independent record label, will distribute the label's releases.

On December 23, 2011, Ayaka made her first public performance since her medical break by appearing on the Music Station 2011 Special. She performed two new songs, "Yasashii Ao" (優しい青) and "Hajimari No Toki" (はじまりのとき) from her upcoming album.

On December 31, 2011, Ayaka appeared on the 62nd NHK Kohaku Uta Gassen, singing 'Minna Sora no Shita' as part of the Red team.

=== 2012 ===
On January 1, 2012, video performances and interviews of her upcoming songs were released exclusively on Ayaka's Gyao! Yahoo! Japan dedicated website, including "Hajimari no toki" and "Yasashii ao". She also announced on the same day that she would be touring live across Japan from April 27 through July 25, 2012.

Ayaka's album The Beginning was released on February 1, 2012. This was her third studio album, which was self-produced and released under her own label.

On March 31, 2012, Ayaka announced that she would be providing the new theme song for NTV's news program News Zero. The song, titled "Tsuyoku Omou" (ツヨク想う), was the first song Ayaka had written since resuming her activities. It was used on the program starting April 2.

Japanese singer Shizuka Kudō released a new single titled "Kimi ga Kureta Mono" on October 17. The title track was written by Ayaka, marking the first time she has written music for another artist.

A live DVD & Blu-ray of her recent tour, Ayaka Live Tour 2012: The Beginning – Hajimari no Toki was released on December 12, 2012. The DVD & Blu-ray featured the finale of Ayaka's first nationwide tour in four years, "Live Tour 2012: The Beginning – Hajimari no Toki", which was held on August 8 at the Yokohama Arena. It contains a total of 14 songs including tracks from her album The Beginning, as well as her song "Minna Sora no Shita", and a cover of Adele's "Rolling in the Deep".

=== 2013-2020 ===
Ayaka's 11th single, "Beautiful/Chiisana Ashiato" (Beautiful/ちいさな足跡) was released on February 20, 2013. This was her first single in three and a half years, after "Minna Sora no Shita" was released in July 2009. It was her first proper single since returning from a hiatus last year.

"Beautiful/Chiisana Ashiato" comes in CD-only and CD+DVD versions. In addition to the two A-side tracks, the single come with an English version of "Hajimari no Toki", the lead track from her album The Beginning.

On May 31, 2013, Ayaka announced on her fanclub website Room Ayaka, that she would once again be embarking on a nationwide tour. The tour titled, "絢香 LIVE TOUR 2013 Fortune Cookie～なにが出るかな！？～" The tour consists of 19 dates, and begins in Kobe, Japan on September 5, 2013. While on tour, Ayaka released her first cover album entitled Yūon Club: 1st Grade on September 4, featuring songs from Utada Hikaru and Mr. Children.

It was announced late August that Ayaka would sing the campaign song for Nestle's Kit Kat to celebrate the 40th anniversary in Japan. The song, titled "Arigato No Wa" was Ayaka's first new song in six months. The song was digitally released October 4, 2013. A preview of the music video had been released earlier that week through Ayaka's official YouTube Channel, AyakaMV.

In 2014, Ayaka released "number one", the theme song for the Fuji TV Sochi Olympics relay. Ayaka released her fourth studio album, Rainbow Road, on 15 April 2015, reached number 3 on the Oricon Weekly Charts.

Her song "A Song For You" is the Japanese theme song of The Peanuts Movie.

In 2017, Ayaka released her 16th single, ''Kotonoha" (コトノハ) on May 5. The single was used as the theme song Tsubaki Bunguten ~Kamakura Daishoya Monogatari~, followed by "Sakura" (サクラ) on October 14. In 2018, she released two collaborations with Daichi Miura ("Heart Up" (ハートアップ), released on 14 February), and Kreva ("Glory", released on 31 August). She released her fifth studio album 30 y/o on 14 November 2018, and released her second cover album, Yūon Club: 2nd Grade on 13 May 2020, featuring songs from Porno Graffitti and Mr. Children. Also in 2020, she released her 19th single on March 5, "Michishirube (道しるべ)", followed by her second collaboration with Daichi Miura "Negaiboshi (ねがいぼし)", and her first Christmas song, "Xmas Santa."

=== 2021-2025: 15th Anniversary ===
In 2021, to celebrate her 15th year in the music industry, Ayaka released two new singles in April, "Motto Ī Hi ni (もっといい日に)" and "Tender Love", and held a tour nationwide, which will be held in September. The song "Motto Ī Hi ni (もっといい日に)" became the theme song for the tour as it was released in commemoration of her 15th debut anniversary.

She also released two songs for Tales of Arise, "Blue Moon" for the game's ending song and her cover version of My Little Lover's "Hello, Again ~Mukashikara Aru Basho~" (Hello, Again 〜昔からある場所〜, Hello, Again ~A Place that has Been Around for a Long Time~) for the game's insert song. A new song, "100 years and 10 colors" (百年十色), will be released alongside the release of the Shin-etsu Broadcasting's 70th anniversary movie Persephone Tears. On 23 October, Ayaka announced sixth studio album Love Cycle, which was released on 1 February 2022, followed by her seventh release, Funtale, on 21 June 2023, and her eighth, Wonder!, which will be released on 3 September 2025.

== Personal life ==
Ayaka married Japanese actor Hiro Mizushima on February 22, 2009. The couple announced their first child (daughter) in June 2015. Their second daughter was born in October 2019.

== Discography ==
=== Studio albums ===
- First Message (2006)
- Sing to the Sky (2008)
- The Beginning (2012)
- Rainbow Road (2015)
- 30 y/o (2018)
- Love Cycle (2022)
- Funtale (2023)
- Wonder! (2025)

== Awards ==
Year	Ceremony	Award	Work
2006	Japan Record Award	Best New Artist Award	Herself
2006	Japan Cable Award	Best New Artist Award	Herself
2007	Japan Record Award	Gold Award	Jewelry Day
2007	Space Shower Music Awards	Breakthrough Video	Mikazuki

Preceded by AAA	Japan Record Award for Best New Artist; 2006	Succeeded by Cute
