= 2005 MTV Video Music Awards Japan =

Annual Japanese music awards ceremony

- Date: May 29, 2005
- Location: Tokyo Bay NK Hall, Japan
- Hosted by: Takashi Fujii and Megumi
- Website: mtvjapan.com/mvaj

Television/radio coverage
- Network: MTV Japan

The MTV Video Music Awards Japan 2005 were hosted by Takashi Fujii and Megumi at Tokyo Bay NK Hall. The awards included performances by Namie Amuro, Rain, Mariah Carey, Hoobastank, Jamiroquai and Ashanti.

== Awards ==
Winners are in bold text.

=== Video of the Year ===
Orange Range — "Hana"

- Namie Amuro — "Girl Talk"
- Destiny's Child — "Lose My Breath"
- Eminem — "Just Lose It"
- Usher featuring Lil' Jon and Ludacris — "Yeah!"

=== Album of the Year ===
Orange Range — MusiQ

- Eminem — Encore
- Green Day — American Idiot
- Ken Hirai — Sentimentalovers
- Usher — Confessions

=== Best Male Video ===
Ken Hirai — "Hitomi o Tojite"

- Kreva — "Hitori Janai No Yo"
- Tamio Okuda — "Nanto Iu"
- Usher featuring Lil' Jon and Ludacris — "Yeah!"
- Kanye West — "Jesus Walks"

=== Best Female Video ===
Mika Nakashima — "Sakurairo Mau Koro"

- Ayumi Hamasaki — "Inspire"
- Avril Lavigne — "My Happy Ending"
- Jennifer Lopez — "Get Right"
- Hikaru Utada — "Easy Breezy"

=== Best Group Video ===
Linkin Park — "Breaking The Habit"

- Asian Kung-Fu Generation — "Kimi no Machi Made"
- Destiny's Child — "Lose My Breath"
- Exile — "Carry On"
- Orange Range — "Locolotion"

=== Best New Artist ===
Sambomaster — "Utsukushiki Ningen no Hibi"

- Ciara featuring Petey Pablo — "Goodies"
- Franz Ferdinand — "Take Me Out"
- Nobodyknows — "Kokoro Odoru"
- Ashlee Simpson — "Pieces of Me"

=== Best Rock Video ===
Hoobastank — "The Reason"

- Asian Kung-Fu Generation — "Kimi no Machi Made"
- Good Charlotte — "Predictable"
- Linkin Park — "Breaking The Habit"
- Sambomaster — "Utsukushiki Ningen no Hibi"

=== Best Pop Video ===
Ketsumeishi — "Kimi ni Bump"

- Blue — "Curtain Falls"
- Exile — "Carry On"
- Gwen Stefani — "What You Waiting For?"
- Yuki — "Joy"

=== Best R&B Video ===
Namie Amuro — "Girl Talk"

- Ai — "E.O."
- Crystal Kay — "Kiss"
- Alicia Keys — "If I Ain't Got You"
- Usher — "Burn"

=== Best Hip Hop Video ===
Beastie Boys — "Ch-Check It Out"

- The Black Eyed Peas — "Let's Get It Started"
- Kreva featuring Mummy-D — "Funky Glamorous"
- Nitro Microphone Underground — "Still Shinin"
- Kanye West — "Jesus Walks"

=== Best Video from a Film ===
Ken Hirai — "Hitomi o Tojite" (from Crying Out Love in the Center of the World)

- Christina Aguilera featuring Missy Elliott — "Car Wash" (from Shark Tale)
- Ray Charles — "What'd I Say" (from Ray)
- Ana Johnsson — "We Are" (from Spider-Man 2)
- Orange Range — "Hana" (from Be with You)

=== Best Collaboration ===
Jay-Z/Linkin Park — "Numb/Encore"

- Ai featuring Afra and Tucker — "Watch Out!"
- Kiyoshiro Imawano featuring Rhymester — "Ame Agarino Yozora Ni 35"
- Snoop Dogg featuring Pharrell — "Drop It Like It's Hot"
- Usher and Alicia Keys — "My Boo"

=== Best Buzz Asia ===
==== Japan ====
Orange Range — "Locolotion"

- Exile — "Real World"
- Gospellers — "Mimoza"
- Tokyo Jihen — "Gunjō Biyori"
- Yuki — "Joy"

==== South Korea ====
Rain — "It's Raining"

- Tony An — "Love Is More Beautiful When You Can't Have IT"
- g.o.d — "An Ordinary Day"
- Jang Na-ra — "Winter Diary"
- Tim — "Thank You"

==== Taiwan ====
Stefanie Sun — "Running"

- Stanley Huang — "Who am I to You"
- Fish Liang — "Can't Hear It"
- S.H.E — "Persian Cat"
- Jolin Tsai — "Pirates"

== Special awards ==
=== Best Director ===
Yasuo Inoue

=== Best Special Effects ===
Gagle — "Rap Wonder DX"

=== Best Style ===
Ashanti

=== Most Entertaining Video ===
Gorie with Jasmine Ann Allen and Yamasaki Joann Shikou — "Micky"

=== International Video Icon Award ===
Mariah Carey

=== Most Impressive Performing Asian Artist ===
Namie Amuro

== Live performances ==
- Ashanti
- Crystal Kay
- Gorie
- Hoobastank
- Jamiroquai
- Ken Hirai
- Mariah Carey
- Namie Amuro
- Orange Range
- Rain
