= Ninja Hattori-kun =

Japanese manga series by Fujiko A. Fujio

- Ninja Hattori CD cover

忍者ハットリくん
- Manga
- Written by: Fujiko Fujio
- Published by: Kobunsha
- Magazine: CoroCoro Comic; Televi-Kun
- Original run: 1964 – 1968
- Volumes: 4
- Television drama

Ninja Hattori-kun Ninja Hattori + Ninja Monster Jippō
- Directed by: Shoichi Shimazu
- Produced by: Hiroki Ogawa (season 1); Akira Yuyama (season 2)
- Written by: Hisashi Inoue
- Original network: NET
- Original run: April 7, 1966 – January 25, 1968
- Episodes: 52
- Manga
- Written by: Fujiko Fujio A
- Published by: Shogakukan
- Magazine: CoroCoro Comic; Televi-Kun
- Original run: 1981 – 1988
- Volumes: 12
- Anime television series
- Directed by: Fumio Ikeno; Hiroshi Sasagawa (chief)
- Music by: Shunsuke Kikuchi
- Studio: Shin-Ei Animation
- Original network: ANN (TV Asahi)
- English network: IN: Nickelodeon; SEA: Disney Channel
- Original run: September 28, 1981 – December 25, 1987
- Episodes: 694 + 11 special episodes
- Anime film

Ninja Hattori-kun: Nin Nin Ninpo Enikki no Maki
- Directed by: Kazunori Takahashi
- Studio: Shin-Ei Animation
- Released: March 13, 1982
- Runtime: 35 minutes
- Anime film

Ninja Hattori-kun: Nin Nin Furusato Daisakusen no Maki
- Studio: Shin-Ei Animation
- Released: March 12, 1983
- Runtime: 53 minutes
- Anime film

Ninja Hattori-kun + Perman: ESP Wars
- Studio: Shin-Ei Animation
- Released: March 17, 1984
- Runtime: 52 minutes
- Anime film

Ninja Hattori-kun + Perman: Ninja Beast Jippō vs. Miracle Egg
- Studio: Shin-Ei Animation
- Released: March 16, 1985
- Runtime: 50 minutes
- Anime television series

Ninja Hattori-kun Returns
- Directed by: Tetsuo Yasumi
- Produced by: Suprita Patil; Takahiro Kishimoto; Satoshi Kaishō; Kei Mizutani; Motomichi Araki
- Written by: Tetsuo Yasumi
- Music by: Rahul Bhatt
- Studio: Reliance MediaWorks; Green Gold Animations; Shin-Ei Animation
- Original network: Animax
- English network: AU: Netflix; CA: Netflix; IN: Nickelodeon; SEA: Disney Channel; UK: Netflix; US: Netflix
- Original run: May 13, 2013 – February 16, 2015
- Episodes: 156
- Other content
- Ninja Hattori-kun (video game); Nin x Nin: Ninja Hattori-kun, the Movie (live-action film)
- icon

Ninja Hattori (忍者ハットリくん, Ninja Hattori-kun) is a Japanese manga series written and illustrated by Fujiko Fujio A (initially credited as Fujiko Fujio) which was serialized between 1964 and 1988. It was later adapted into a television drama that aired on TV Asahi (then known as NET) from 1966 to 1968; an anime series by Shin-Ei Animation, airing on TV Asahi from 1981 to 1987; a video game by Hudson Soft; four anime films by Shin-Ei and a live-action film. A remake of the 1981 anime series was produced by Shin-Ei and the Indian animation firms Reliance MediaWorks and later Green Gold Animations which aired on TV Asahi and Animax from 2013–2015.

== Plot ==
10-year-old Kenichi Mitsuba is an average kid who goes to elementary school and struggles with his studies. He is very stubborn and lazy, therefore always ending up frustrating his parents and teachers.

Meanwhile, a young ninja named Kanzo Hattori becomes best friends with Kenichi. Hattori becomes a part of the Mitsuba family along with his brother, Shinzo and his ninja dog, Shishimaru. Hattori helps Kenichi with his problems, constantly keeping an eye on him as a good friend, though he is often annoyed by Kenichi's attempts to take the easy way out. Yumeko is portrayed as Kenichi's love interest.

The main antagonists are Kemumaki, a Koga Ninja, and his ninja-cat, Kagechiyo. Kemaki always causes trouble for Kenichi and Hattori, sometimes inventing new devices to fight against Hattori but always ending up in mishap. Kenichi asking Hattori to take revenge is a recurring storyline present throughout many episodes. Although Hattori is a good friend, Kenichi sometimes fights with him due to misunderstandings created by Kemumaki. Sometimes Jippou, Togejirou and Tsubame help him.

There are five main locations in the series: Tokyo City, Shinto Temple, Iga Province, Iga Mountains, and Kōga Valley.

== Characters ==
=== Main ===
- Kanzo Hattori (服部(ハットリ) 貫蔵(カンゾウ), Hattori Kanzō)

(voice: Junko Hori; drama actor: Kōtoku Nomura, drama voice: Kazuo Imakura, live-action film actor: Shingo Katori)
Hattori-kun is the protagonist of the series, a little ninja who is named after his ancestor Hattori Hanzō. He is 11 years old and, despite his age, a skilled ninja who left his home in Iga to train in Tokyo, where he took up residence in the Mitsuba household. The show follows his many adventures and daily life living in modern Japan and his friendship with Kenichi Mitsuba. Both boys find a rival in Kemaki (Kemumaki in some dubs), another young ninja in Kenichi's class. Hattori-kun's main weakness is that he is terrified of frogs (Ranidaphobia) . He has strong beliefs on what makes a good ninja and reminds everyone of the same.

- Kenichi Mitsuba (三葉(みつば) ケン一, Mitsuba Ken'ichi)

(voice: Masako Sugaya (1980s series), Tomomi Tenjinbayashi (2012 series); drama actor: Katsumi Takamiya, live-action film actor: Yuri Chinen)
A 10-year-old elementary schooler who is very irresponsible, lazy and doesn't have much academic or athletic talent but enjoys photography. He has a huge crush on his classmate Yumeko, in the process of which he often gets into trouble with his rival Kemaki and convinces the hesitant Hattori to help him. He is not above tricking Hattori into lending a hand.

- Shinzō Hattori (服部(ハットリ) 心蔵(シンゾウ), Hattori Shinzō)

(voice: Yūko Mita (1980s series), Yukiko Hinata (2012 series); drama actor: Shigeki Nakajō)
Shinzo is Kanzo's five-year-old younger brother who followed him to Tokyo. Being only an apprentice ninja he uses wooden weapons. His older brother Hattori is his role model. He can cry extremely loudly, stunning people and even causing them to faint. He helps Kanzo fight Kemumaki, sometimes using his loud crying to immobilise opponents.

- Yumeko Kawai (河合(かわい) 夢子(ゆめこ), Kawai Yumeko)

(voice: Runa Akiyama (1980s series), Haruka Sato (2012 series), Yuka Iwahashi (2012 series))
Yumeko-chan, is a classmate and friend of Kenichi's. Both Kenichi and Kemaki have unrequited crushes on her, causing a rivalry between the two boys. Yumeko sees Hattori and Shinzo as brothers. She is a pianist and hates bell peppers.

- Shishimaru (獅子丸(ししまる), Shishimaru)

(voice: Kenichi Ogata)
Shishimaru is a ninja dog living with Kenichi, who came along with Kanzo and Shinzo Hattori. He is often lazy and stubborn. Along with Shinzo, the two of them wind up doing mischief and creating trouble. He has an attack technique of turning in a fireball when provoked. He also has the ability to change form into any other animal. He loves to eat all kinds of delicious food especially chocolate roll.

- Kemuzou Kemumaki (ケムマキ・ケムゾウ, Kemumaki Kemuzō)

(voice: Kaneta Kimotsuki (1980s series), Kazuki Ogawa (2012 series), live-action film actor: Gorie)
Kemuzou Kemumaki is the antagonist of Ninja Hattori-kun. The 11-year-old ninja comes from the Koga village and hence is a sworn rival of the Iga native Hattoris. He lives alone in a small apartment with his ninja cat Kagechiyo. As per the Koga rules, his ninja identity is a secret, with only Kenichi and the Hattoris knowing about his dual life while he attends elementary school as a normal student. He is much better in studies and sports than Kenichi, however he isn't as good a ninja as Hattori-kun but never gives up trying to beat him. Despite being the main antagonist, he is actually a nice but lonely boy who sometimes helps out his rivals. He is also quite innovative, often making many new tools unlike Hattori who uses his traditional tools. Kemaki strongly adheres to his clan rules of never using ninjutsu for criminal acts, going so far as to temporarily excommunicate Kagechiyo for stealing an ice cream.

- Kagechiyo (影千代(かげちよ), Kagechiyo)

(voice: Eiko Yamada (1980s series), Ai Fukada (2012 series))
Kagechiyo is a talking ninja-cat of the Kōga-ryū clan. He serves as the supporting antagonist in the series. Usually, Kemumaki assigns significant tasks in his plans for Kagechiyo to carry out, but he often fails to succeed. This is because he doesn't receive enough training from Kemumaki and is often seen sleeping on the streets. Hattori notices him several times. He has a rivalry with Shishimaru. He typically hides in the Mitsuba house to eavesdrop on Kenichi and his friends' plans, and afterwards, he informs Kemumaki about them, making him well-suited to being a spy. At times, he resents Kemumaki for his strictness and imagines living a life of luxury as a normal cat in some episodes. He obtains an attack of static electricity by rubbing a shiny metal plate against his back. If he uses this attack too much, it will drain his energy, and he will feel weak.

=== Supporting ===
- Aiko-Sensei (愛子先生)

(voice: Yōko Kawanami (1980s series), Ai Fukada (2012 series))
One of Kenichi's teachers. Koike-sensei has a crush on her. The subject she teaches is unknown. Though in many episodes she is shown teaching the class music.

- Koike-Sensei (小池先生)

(voice: Issei Futamata (1980s series), Hayato Nakata (2012 series), Tomokazu Yajima (2012 series))
Kenichi's teacher, also appears as a ramen chef in Obake no Q-tarō. He is caricatured after animator Shin'ichi Suzuki.

- Kentaro Mitsuba (三葉 健太郎)

(voice: Yuzuru Fujimoto (1980s series), Eiji Yanagisawa (2012 series); drama actor: Teizō Muta)
Kenichi's father. He usually smokes and comes from his office late in the evening. He likes eating and golf a lot. Though a rather plump man, in some of the episodes, his size seems to change, going from stouter to slimmer. He gave Kenichi his name, hoping for his son's good health.

- Taeko Mitsuba (三葉 妙子)

(voice: Yukiko Nashiwa (1980s series), Miwa Kitahara (2012 series); drama actor: Chiharu Kuri)
The mother of Kenichi. She is a slim housewife who is busy keeping order of a house inhabited by six, including Shinzo who often wets his futon. She likes Tsubame and thinks that Kemaki is a good boy (not knowing of his ninja identity and pranking habit). Kenichi constantly stresses her out with his bad grades and his preference for playing over studying, making her lecture him.

- Tsubame (ツバメ)

(voice: Fuyumi Shiraishi (1980s series))
A.k.a. Tsubame-ko, is a kunoichi and classmate of Hattori-kun. She likes Hattori and always wishes to marry him. She has a dislike for Kemumaki and Kagechiyo. She wears pink coloured ninja robes. She seems to own a recorder, a clarinet, a flute, a piccolo and a bassoon, five woodwind instruments.

=== Other ===
- Professor Shinobino (シノビノ博士, Shinobino Hakase)

(voice: Reizō Nomoto (1980s series))
A professor who lives in the United States (USA) and invented Togejirou.

- Togejirou (トゲ次郎, Togejirō)

(voice: Hiroko Maruyama (1980s series))
A cactus having supernatural powers is sent by Professor Shinobino from the United States. Shisimaru does not like Cacto-chan and loves to compete with him.

- Isa Yohi

A koga ninja girl who is a senior of Kemumaki and a frenemy of Hattori. First she start to fight Ninja Hattori. Later She also helps Hattori and His Friends. This character was appeared in 2012 Anime only.

- Robert

An american ninja who is a student of Ninja Hattori. He learns only wrong Ninja techniques. Later these become very useful to him.

- Saizo

An iga ninja boy who tries to achieve primary school certification. His power is creating a cloud and using for a transportation.

- Gosuke

An iga ninja boy who tries to achieve Primary School Certification. His power is do anything within few seconds.

- Surasuke

An iga ninja boy who tries to achieve Primary School Certification. His power is speed.

- Old Grandma

Saizo Gosuke and Surasuke's adopted grandmother. She like them and take care him as grandsons. She also helps Hattori and Kenechi.

- Kittu

Kiyo's Little Brother Cat. Kittu likes Kiyo and thought as a Big Brother. Kittu uses Ninja techniques also. Kittu mostly appears in the 2012 anime.

- Momombe

An iga ninja squirrel who is a childhood friend of Shishimaru's. Momombe uses more ninja techniques than Shishimaru. Momombe mostly appears in the 2012 anime.

- Inspector

A sub-inspector of Mitoriquaika City. He likes Hattori because Hattori and his friends help him to catch the thieves. He mostly appears in 1981 anime.

- Jinzo Hattori (ハットリ ジンゾウ)

(voice: Tadao Futami (1980s series))
Hattori-kun and Shinzou's father. He also appear in Perman, when he fights with Perman.

- Jippo (忍者怪獣ジッポウ, Ninja Kaijū Jippō)

(voice: Junpei Takiguchi (1980s series), drama voice: Hiroko Maruyama)
A giant turtle monster ninja. He and Hattori are ninja partners.

- Tai-chan

A baby who uses ninja techniques perfectly. He learned ninja techniques who taught by Hattori Kanzou. Tai-chan is mostly appeared in 2012 anime.

- Toko

Yumeko's pet. Toko always likes Kenichi. So, it became a friend to Kenichi. Toko is appeared in 2012 anime.

- Mimicky

Kiyo's enemy and Kemumaki's old pet. He copies everyone for his hungry. He ate free food who given by his owner who copied by Mimicky.

- Ninja Eagle

An iga valley's messenger. It gives a message who was given by an iga valley's members to Hattori.

- Pet Teacher

Kenichi's pet teacher was appeared in few Episodes of 2012 Anime.

- Mokamaru

He is a high tech ninja. Hattori's old enemy. He uses computer ninja techniques to attack Hattori. He appears in the movie Ninja Hattori-kun: Nin Nin Furusato Daisakusen no Maki (Ninja Hattori - Home Town).

- Green Frog

Kemumaki's pet. Kemumaki use this pet to beat Hattori's brave. Green frog is appeared in 2012 anime.

== Media ==
=== Manga ===
The first manga series was published in Kobunsha's Shōnen in 1964 and ended in 1968. A second manga series was published by Shogakukan in various kids magazines like CoroCoro Comic, Televi-Kun and others from 1981 to 1988.

=== TV drama ===
It was made into a live-action TV drama. Aired from 1966–1968. This was a work of special effects sitcom. This drama was aired on NET and was divided into 2 seasons, first season aired from 7 April to 28 September 1966, second season aired from August 3, 1967, to January 25, 1968. Each season consists of 26 episodes, in total 52 episodes from 2 seasons.

=== Anime ===
==== 1981 animated series ====
The first animated series aired on TV Asahi in Japan from September 28, 1981, to December 25, 1987, for a total of 694 episodes and 11 special episodes, in total 705 episodes.

Amazon Prime Video India began streaming the series in English, Tamil, Telugu and Hindi in December 2016. Netflix began streaming the "fifth season" (53 episodes) of the Indian English dub in the United States, Canada, the United Kingdom, Australia, and India on December 22, 2018. Since May 15, 2020, Netflix no longer streams them. In Korea, from December 19, 2005, it was aired on Talent TV until the 5th season (JEI Talent Broadcasting at the time of the first airing in 2005). Currently, Nickelodeon is broadcasting New Ninja Hattori. The main character, the ninja Hattori Ganjo Hanzo (Tori), has a distinctive dialect accent and a 'nin nin nin nin nin' tone.

In Vietnam, the series was re-released by POPS Kids on digital platforms and YouTube with a Vietnamese dub version by Purpose Media from 2018 and 2022.

==== 2013 animated series ====
In January 2012, Nikkei announced on its website that a remake of the animated series under production by Indian production company Reliance MediaWorks and Shin-Ei Animation. The announcement was part of a move to produce several remakes of popular animated television series to be broadcast across television stations in the Asian market to counteract Japan's stagnating domestic animation marketplace due to its declining birthrate. Shin-Ei Animation is currently collaborating with Green Gold Animation to produce new episodes of the series. Yūichi Nagata, producer at Shin-Ei Animation, stated that the current collaboration will be between Shin-Ei's "creative content" and Green Gold Animation's "quality of skills in animation making and diligence".

The new series began airing in India and Indonesia on May of the same year, as well as China. It premiered on Animax in Japan on May 13, 2013.

Netflix, initially set to stream the Indian English dub of the first two seasons in early 2019, began streaming them in the United States, Canada, the United Kingdom, Australia, and India on December 22, 2018. Since May 15, 2020, Netflix no longer streams them.

==== Home media ====
The 1981 animated series was released on two, nine-disc DVD box sets by Columbia Music Entertainment in Japan. The first box set was released on August 31, 2005, while the second was released on November 2 that same year.

The Japanese dub of the 2012 series was released on a five-disc DVD box set, under the title Ninja Hattori-kun Returns (忍者ハットリくんリターンズ), by TC Entertainment, Inc. on July 11, 2014, in Japan.

=== Live-action film ===
A live-action film entitled Nin x Nin: Ninja Hattori-kun, the Movie was released in 2004.
