= Ikenai Taiyō =

"Ikenai Taiyō イケナイ太陽"

Single by Orange Range

from the album Panic Fancy
- B-side: "Iketenai Taiyō"
- Released: July 18, 2007
- Genre: Pop/rock
- Label: SMEJ

Orange Range singles chronology
"Ika Summer" (2007)	"Ikenai Taiyō イケナイ太陽" (2007)	"Kimi Station" (2008)

"Ikenai Taiyō" (イケナイ太陽) is the 17th single released from the Japanese pop band Orange Range.

== Overview ==
Ikenai Taiyō is the 9th single to be released by Orange Range. The title song was used as the opening to the 2007 J-Drama version of Hanazakari no Kimitachi e. The single comes in two versions: a limited edition CD+DVD version and a CD only version. The CD+DVD version of the single comes with a digest of performances from Orange Range's fanclub live concerts. The single peaked at #2 on the Oricon daily charts and gained a spot of #3 on the weekly charts, still managing their highest sales in a year.

=== Music Video ===
Two versions of the music video were released with both aptly named "Heisei" and "Reiwa" versions.

The original version was first released back on 2007, with the music video has certain clips from various MV of Orange Range's past works including new footage. This leads to certain speculation that a completed uncensored version was never released to the public. This stayed until December 31, 2025 during the 76th NHK Kohaku Uta Gassen, that the full "shelved" was released online on YouTube with permission from Toei producer Shinichiro Shirakura.

The shelved version, according to the band members, is made as a parody of the Super Sentai series and several Tokusatsu series in general, containing several references to them. Produced by Toei and directed by Smith, the music video was meant to be released back at 2007, but Sony Music Entertainment Japan cancelled its release due to the included sex scene in the video and it was heavily edited to meet company guidelines.

== Tracks ==
- CD version
1. "Ikenai Taiyō" (イケナイ太陽)
2. "Iketenai Taiyō" (イケテナイ太陽)
- DVD version
1. "Danshi-ing Session" (男子ing session Dancing Boy Session)
2. "Winter Winner"
3. "Miracle"

== Charts ==
=== Oricon chart (Japan) ===
Release	Chart	Peak position	Sales total
July 18, 2007	Oricon DailySingles Chart	2	101,649
July 18, 2007	Oricon Weekly Singles Chart	3	101,649
