= Orange Ball =

Studio album by Orange Range
- Genre: Alternative rock, pop rock, rap rock

Orange Ball (オレンジボール), an indies mini-album, is Orange Range's first release. It was originally released nationally on February 22, 2002 and an Okinawa-only release was released on April 21, 2002. Kirikirimai was later rerecorded and released on their album 1st Contact.

== Track listing ==
1. Soujuuko (奏重鼓)
2. Gadget Groove (ガジェットグルーヴ)
3. Kirikirimai (キリキリマイ)
4. Flower Garden (フラワーガーデン)
5. Chuudoku (中毒)
6. Velocity (ベロシティー)
7. Funk Tune (ファンクテューン)
8. Soujuuko: RKDRMX- (奏重鼓)
