= World World World =

World World World can refer to:

- World World World (Asian Kung-Fu Generation album), a 2008 album
- World World World (Orange Range album), a 2009 album
