= Be With You (2018 film) =

2018 film by Lee Jang-hoon

- Theatrical release poster
- Hangul: 지금 만나러 갑니다
- Lit.: Now I Will Meet You
- RR: Jigeum mannareo gamnida
- MR: Chigŭm mannarŏ kamnida
- Directed by: Lee Jang-hoon
- Screenplay by: Lee Jang-hoon; Kang Soo-jine
- Based on: Be With You by Takuji Ichikawa
- Produced by: Yang Soo-jung
- Starring: So Ji-sub; Son Ye-jin
- Cinematography: Cho Sang-yun
- Edited by: Nam Na-yeong
- Music by: Bang Jun-seok
- Production company: Movie Rock
- Distributed by: Lotte Entertainment
- Release date: March 14, 2018
- Running time: 131 minutes
- Country: South Korea
- Language: Korean
- Box office: US$19.7 million

Be With You (Korean: 지금 만나러 갑니다; RR: Jigeum mannareo gamnida) is a 2018 South Korean romantic fantasy drama film directed by Lee Jang-hoon. It follows a man (So Ji-sub) who is reunited with his late wife (Son Ye-jin) on a rainy day, only to discover that she has no memory of their past, leading them to rediscover their love. The film is a remake of the 2004 Japanese film of the same name, which is based on a novel by Takuji Ichikawa.

== Plot ==
Soo-ah left behind an unbelievable promise, to return on a rainy day, before she died. One year later, during a summer monsoon, Soo-ah suddenly reappears, looking exactly as she did before she left this world. However, she has no memory of Woo-jin or their past together. While Woo-jin is simply overjoyed to have her by his side again, Soo-ah grows curious about the love story she cannot remember. As Woo-jin recounts their first meeting, first love, first date, and their happiest moments together, Soo-ah finds herself falling in love with him all over again.

== Cast ==
- So Ji-sub as Jung Woo-jin
  - Lee Yoo-jin as young Woo-jin
- Son Ye-jin as Im Soo-ah
  - Kim Hyun-soo as young Soo-ah
- Kim Ji-hwan as Jung Ji-ho, the couple's son
- Ko Chang-seok as Hong-goo
  - Bae Yoo-ram as young Hong-goo
- Lee Jun-hyeok as instructor Choi
- Seo Jeong-yeon as Seo-bin's mom
- Park Seo-joon as adult Ji-ho
- Gong Hyo-jin as Woman in Hanbok
- Son Yeo-eun as Hyun-jung

== Production ==
The film is based on the Japanese novel Be with You, written by Takuji Ichikawa.

Also, Japan made the film 'Be with you' based on Novel which have same title with movie in 2005.

Son Ye-jin and So Ji-sub have previously worked together in the 2001 drama series Delicious Proposal as siblings. Ko Chang-seok and So Ji-sub have also appeared together previously in the 2008 film Rough Cut.

Filming began August 12, 2017 and finished November 12, 2017 in Daejeon, South Korea.

== Release ==
On March 6, 2018, a promotional press conference was held with the main cast and director in presence.

Be With You was released internationally in 17 countries including: USA, Canada, Britain, Ireland, Australia, New Zealand, Taiwan, Singapore, Taiwan, Vietnam and Malaysia.

The film was released in local theaters on March 14, 2018.

Now, people can see this film on Watcha, Tiving, Apple TV, etc.

== Reception ==
According to Korean Film Council, Be With You achieved first place at the local box office on its opening day by attracting 89,758 moviegoers. The film was shown 4,275 times on 989 screens.

During the first weekend of its release, the film sold a total of 682,789 tickets, accounting for 44.6 percent of the weekend tickets and placing first at the weekend box office.

Be With You surpassed 1 million viewers within seven days since its local release and is ahead of popular melo-romance films Architecture 101 and The Beauty Inside which took eight and nine days respectively to achieve 1 million moviegoers.

Throughout the second weekend, the film attracted 576,981 moviegoers at 1,190 screens by placing second at the weekend box office. The total number of ticket sales increased to 1.82 million by the end of the second weekend.

== Awards and nominations ==
Awards	Category	Recipients	Result	Ref.
54th Baeksang Arts Awards	Best Actress	Son Ye-jin	Nominated	
2nd The Seoul Awards	Best Actress	Son Ye-jin	Won	
