= Ika Summer =

Single by Orange Range

from the album Panic Fancy
- Released: April 25, 2007
- Genre: Pop
- Label: Sony Music
- Songwriters: Yamato Ganeko, Naoto Hiroyama, Hiroki Hokama, Ryou Murayama, Yoh Murayama

Orange Range singles chronology
"Sayonara" (2006)	"Ika Summer" (2007)	"Ikenai Taiyō" (2007)

"Ika Summer" (イカSummer, ika samaa) translated as Fake or Squid Summer is the 8th single from the Japanese band Orange Range. It was their first new single in nearly seven months.

== Overview ==
"Ika Summer" was used as in various commercials for a new brand of makeup named Kanebo Allie. The B-side song is a rearrangement of a single from their indie album named SJK06. The title is a pun; the word ikasama means "fake", and "summer" is pronounced almost the same as "sama" in Japanese, thus "Fake Summer", which the band claims was used because the theme of the song is summer but it will be released before the season. The official title literally reads "Squid Summer" though. On its first day, the single reached the third spot on Oricon's charts and would reach the same spot for its first week.

== Track list ==
1. "Ika Summer" (イカSummer)
2. "SJK06"
3. "Dance2 (Kagami Remix)"

== Charts ==
=== Oricon chart (Japan) ===
Release	Chart	Peak position	Sales total
April 25, 2007	Oricon DailySingles Chart	2	56,531
April 25, 2007	Oricon Weekly Singles Chart	3	56,531
