= MusiQ =

musiQ

Studio album by Orange Range
- Released: December 1, 2004
- Genre: Alternative rock, rap rock, pop rock, grebo
- Length: 65:35
- Label: SME/gr8! Records
- Producer: Satori Shiraishi

Orange Range chronology
1st Contact (2003)	musiQ (2004)	Natural (2005)

musiQ is the third album by Japanese rock band Orange Range released on December 1, 2004.

The album featured four hit singles all of which reached the top of the Japanese Oricon charts; "Michishirube: A Road Home", "Locolotion", "Chest", and their most successful song "Hana". Likewise, the album itself debuted at the number-one on the chart and retained the position for two consecutive weeks.

MusiQ has sold in excess of 2.6 million copies in Japan alone, making it the number one album on the country's year-end charts of the following year. The album is also their most successful album to date.

== Track listing ==
All songs written and composed by the Orange Range, unless otherwise indicated

1. "Ka・Ri・Su・Ma" (Naoto)
2. "Chest (チェスト)"
3. "Locolotion (ロコローション)" (Orange Range, Gerry Goffin, Carole King) (Note: Originally songwriting credit cited only the band as its composer at the time the song was released as a single in June 2004.)
4. "Ishin Denshin (以心電信)"
5. "Zung Zung Funky Music"
6. "Padi Bon Mahe (パディ ボン マヘ)" (Naoto)
7. "City Boy (シティボーイ)"
8. "Xie Xie (謝謝)" (Note: Note that "Xie Xie" can also be found written with alternative spellings "Sha Sha" and "Shei Shei".)
9. "Danshi-ing Session (男子ing Session)"
10. "Beat Ball"
11. "Michishirube ~a road home~ (ミチシルベ 〜a road home〜)"
12. "Hana (花)"
13. "Full Throttle"
14. "Matsuri Danshaku (祭男爵)"
15. "Papa"
16. "Hub Star"
17. "Oh! Yeah"
18. "SP Thanx"
19. "Cipangu 2 Cipangu (ジパング2ジパング)" (Naoto)

Footnotes

== Charts and certifications ==
Chart	Provider	Peak position	Weeks	Certification	Sales
Japanese Albums Chart (Top 200)	Oricon/RIAJ	1	66	11× Platinum (Double million)	2.6 million +
