= Kirikirimai =

Single by Orange Range
- Language: Japanese
- Released: June 4, 2003
- Genre: Nu metal, rap rock
- Length: 20:00
- Label: Sony Music Entertainment (Japan) Inc.

Orange Range singles chronology
"ミチシルベ/ミッドナイトゲージ" (2002)	"Kirikirimai" (2003)	"Shanghai Honey" (2003)

"Kirikirimai" is the second single by the Japanese band Orange Range. It was released on June 4, 2003.

== Track listing ==
1. "Kiri Kiri Mai"
2. "Samurai Mania"
3. "Kirikirimai" - Hisashi Yamada Ver
4. "Kirikirimai" - Ryukyudisco Remix
5. "Tentekomai"

== Charts ==
The single reached number 50 on the Oricon chart, charted for 18 weeks, and sold 20,206 copies.
