= Natural (Orange Range album) =

Studio album by Orange Range
- Released: October 18, 2005
- Genres: Alternative rock, pop rock, post-punk revival, industrial rock, noise rock, grebo
- Label: gr8! Records

Orange Range chronology
MusiQ (2005)	Natural (2005)	Squeezed (2005)

Natural (stylized as ИATURAL) is the fourth album by Japanese rock band, Orange Range. The album was officially released on October 12, 2005, after *: Asterisk, Love Parade, Onegai! Senorita and Kizuna, were released as promotional singles. The song Asterisk was used as the first theme for the Japanese and American versions of the anime show Bleach.

== Overview ==
It is Orange Range's second highest selling album and longest charted album. The album was released after having four singles recorded and released in various promotions. This album is notable for having every song used in some major promotion by various Japanese television stations.

=== Track listing ===
1. A Wind of Dreams (夢風, Yumekaze)
2. Dreaming Person (夢人, Yuumeijin)
3. Please! Miss (お願い！セニョリータ, Onegai! Senyorita)
4. Winter Winner (ウィンタウィンナ, Winta Winna)
5. Crazy Band (クレイジーバンド, Kureizii Bando)
6. Rain (雨, Ame)
7. God69 (God rock)
8. Hysteric Taxi (ヒステリックタクシー, Hisuterikku Takushii)
9. Pe Nyom Pong (ペニョンポン, Pe Nyon Pon)
10. Sakazuki Jammer (盃ジャマー, Sakazuki Jama)
11. *~Asterisk~ (*~アステリスク~, *~Asuterisuku~)
12. Sunrise (サンライズ, Sanraizu)
13. U Topia (ユ・トピア, Yu Topia)
14. Between (ビトウィーン, Bitowin)
15. Re-Cycle (リサイクル, risaikuru)
16. Bonds (絆, Kizuna)
17. Love Parade (ラブパレード, Labu Paredo)
18. Иatural Pop (ナチュラルポップ, nachyuraru poppu)
19. Round and Round Again: Fantastic Four Remix (キリキリマイ〜ファンタスチックフォーリミックス〜, Kirikirimai: Fantasutikku Fo Rimikkusu)
