= Nin x Nin: Ninja Hattori-kun, the Movie =

2004 Japanese action adventure film

- Poster
- NIN×NIN 忍者ハットリくん THE MOVIE
- Directed by: Masayuki Suzuki
- Written by: Magy
- Screenplay by: Yû Irie; Tetsuya Oishi
- Based on: Ninja Hattori-kun by Fujiko Fujio A
- Produced by: Ryoichi Fukuyama; Toru Miyazawa; Madoka Takiyama; Ko Wada; Kazutoshi Wadakura
- Starring: Shingo Katori; Rena Tanaka; Yuri Chinen; Gori
- Cinematography: Hiroshi Takase
- Music by: Takayuki Hattori
- Distributed by: Toho
- Release date: August 28, 2004
- Running time: 118 minutes
- Country: Japan
- Language: Japanese
- Box office: $16.35 million

Nin x Nin: Ninja Hattori-kun, the Movie (NIN×NIN 忍者ハットリくん THE MOVIE Nin x Nin: Ninja Hattori-kun, the Movie) is a 2004 Japanese action adventure film based on the manga series Ninja Hattori-kun by Fujiko Fujio A. The film is directed by Masayuki Suzuki and stars Shingo Katori as Kanzo Hattori. The official English title of the movie is Nin x Nin: The Ninja Star Hattori.

== Plot ==
Iga clan's Ninja teacher Jinzo Hattori sends his son Kanzo Hattori, an apparentice ninja to Edo with a mission to serve a master with a condition: Nobody should see Hattori, except his master, if Hattori is seen by anybody, then he would be banished from the Iga clan. Hattori chooses Kenichi Mitsubha, a 10 year old boy as his master. Hattori meets Kenichi and soon become friends, along with Kenichi's blind artist friend Midori. Hattori always hides himself from Kenichi's parents as per the mission's rule. Hattori finds out that Kenichi's new class teacher, Sato Sensei is actually Kemumaki Kemozo, who is a Koga Ninja.

Meanwhile, a series of murders take place in Edo where Hattori finds a dart belong to Koga clan. He suspect Kemumaki and confronts him, but he denies it and tells that he left Koga clan forever. Kenichi leaves for a trip with Midori. Hattori shows the dart to Kemumaki, who tells that the dart belongs to Kurokage, who is the famous ninja of Koga clan, who killed the Koga and Iga Ninjas with a venomous dart. Hattori, who learns from Midori that Kurokage has kidnapped Kenichi, leaves for Kurokage's hideout and a tense close combat ensues between Hattori and Kurokage. Kemumaki joins forces with Hattori and defeats Kurokage.

Impressed with Hattori and Kenichi's friendship, Kurokage gives a Koga scroll and ask him to deliver to Kemumaki as it contains the antidote of the dart and kills himself by burning the hideout. Hattori escapes from the hideout and tells Kenichi that he should leave for his hometown as he broke the rule and tells Kenichi to be friends with anyone, who could understand and support each other. Hattori gives the scroll to Kemumaki, who cures the ninjas with the antidote. Hattori meets Jenzo and tells that he is ready for the exile, but Jenzo forgives him tells Hattori to return to the city. Hattori arrives again in Edo and reunites with Kenichi.

== Cast ==
- Shingo Katori as Kanzo Hattori
- Rena Tanaka as Midori
- Gori as Kemuzou Kemumaki / Sato Sensei
- Yuri Chinen as Kenichi Mitsuba
- Shirō Itō as Jinzo Hattori
- Keiko Toda as Taeko Mitsuba
- Kazuyuki Asano as Kentaro Mitsuba
- Takeshi Masu as Korakage
- Takashi Ukaji as Tahara Keibu
- Mikihisa Azuma as Detective Kashiwada
