= Ninja Hattori-kun (video game) =

1986 video game

- Front cover of Ninja Hattori-kun package
- Developer: Hudson Soft
- Publisher: Hudson Soft
- Composer: Takeaki Kunimoto
- Platform: Family Computer
- Release: JP: March 5, 1986
- Mode: Single-player

Ninja Hattori-kun (忍者ハットリくん; lit. "Little Ninja Hattori") is a 1986 video game software developed and published by Hudson Soft exclusively in Japan for the Nintendo Family Computer. It is based on Fujiko Fujio A's (pen name of Motoo Abiko) Japanese manga series of the same name, which later became an anime series and Asian franchise. The game was released around the same time the anime was aired. It was among the best selling Famicom games, selling approximately 1,500,000 copies in its lifetime.

== Description ==
=== Plot ===
The plot begins when a young ninja name Kanzo Hattori is searching for his master in order to complete his training. While searching for his master, he encounters a young 10-year-old boy named Ken'ichi Mitsuba and makes him his temporary replacement master. In order to develop Ken'ichi's confidence, they went on many adventures together. The game was aimed at a young audience the same way that the manga and anime did.

=== Gameplay ===
In the game, player controls Kanzo Hattori in a side-scrolling action game. Hattori must run to the right over various terrains, but primarily through the woods. In addition to using throwing stars, Hattori can access one of the other ninja techniques (ninpou), like Kagebashin, Happou no Shuriken, etc. In fact, he learns a total of 11 ninpou; however, he must first collect scrolls that provide those abilities before he can use them. Due to sluggish controls, it can be difficult to clear some of the obstacles that he will face without the ninja abilities to enhance his mobility.

== Release ==
Ninja Hattori-kun was released in Japan for the Famicom on May 5, 1986. It was among the best selling games for the system in Japan, selling 1.5 million cartridges.

== See also ==
- Obake no Q-tarō: WanWan Panic (known outside Japan as Chubby Cherub)
