= Shanghai Honey =

Single by Orange Range
- Language: Japanese
- Released: July 16, 2003
- Genre: J-Pop
- Length: 15:00
- Label: Sony Music Entertainment (Japan) Inc.

Orange Range singles chronology
"Kirikirimai" (2003)	"Shanghai Honey" (2003)	"Viva Rock" (2003)

"Shanghai Honey" is the third single by the Japanese band Orange Range. It was released on July 16, 2003.

== Track listing ==
1. "Shanghai Honey"
2. "New Tokyo Machine"
3. "Shanghai Honey" - Ryukyudisco Remix
4. "Shanghai Honey" - Shanghai Styl

== Charts ==
The single reached number 5 in the Oricon chart, charted for 38 weeks, and sold 240,831 copies.
