= Un Rock Star =

Single by Orange Range
- Released: 30 August 2006
- Genre: Rock/J-pop
- Label: SMEJ

Orange Range singles chronology
"Champione" (2006)	"Un Rock Star" (2006)	"Sayonara" (2006)

"Un Rock Star" is the 9th extended play from the Japanese band Orange Range. This single was used as the cover song for a string of Honda Stream commercials in Japan. It was also used as the theme to a Japanese sports show. This single first entered the Oricon charts at the number 3 spot, breaking the consecutive string of nine number 1 singles. This single was a 100,000 limited-release item.

== Track list ==
- "Un Rock Star"
- "Fūrinkazan" (風林火山; Sengoku-period Battle Flag)
- "My Rifle feat. Petunia Rocks" (マイ・ライフル: feat.ペチュニアロックス)
- "U topia: Live Tour 005 Natural"

== Charts ==
=== Oricon chart (Japan) ===
Release	Chart	Peak position	Sales total
22 June 2006	Oricon Weekly Singles Chart	3	71,288
