= Michishirube/Midnight Gauge =

Single by Orange Range
- Language: Japanese
- English title: Michishirube/Midnight Gauge
- Released: August 25, 2002
- Genre: Rock
- Length: 14:00
- Label: Super ((Echo)) Label

Orange Range singles chronology
"Michishirube/Midnight Gauge" (2002)	"Kirikirimai" (2003)

"Michishirube/Midnight Gauge" (ミチシルベ/ミッドナイトゲージ) is the first single by the Japanese band Orange Range. It was released on August 25, 2002.

== Track listing ==
1. "Michishirube" (ミチシルベ)
2. "Midnight Gauge" (ミッドナイトゲージ)
3. "Kirikirimai" (Ryukyu Disco Remix; キリキリマイ ～リューキューディスコRemix～)

== Charts ==
The single reached number 133 on the Oricon Singles Chart and charted for 10 weeks.
