= Champione =

Single by Orange Range
- B-side: "'Walk On'"
- Released: May 10, 2006
- Genre: Rock/J-pop
- Label: Sony Music Entertainment Japan
- Songwriters: Yamato Ganeko, Naoto Hiroyama, Hiroki Hokama, Ryou Murayama, Yoh Murayama

Orange Range singles chronology
| "Kizuna" (2005) | "Champione" (2006) | "Un Rock Star" (2006) |

"Champione" is the 6th single from the Japanese band Orange Range. It was used as the theme song for the NHK broadcast of the 2006 FIFA World Cup in Germany. The B-Side song "Walk On" was used as the ending theme song for the Japanese movie Check it out yo!. Many fans find this single to be notable because three of the band members forgot their lyrics on stage while performing it for the first time.

== Track listing ==
1. "Champione" (チャンピオーネ)
2. "Walk On"

== Charts ==
| Release | Chart | Peak position | Sales total |
|---|---|---|---|
| 22 June 2005 | Oricon Weekly Singles Chart | 1 | 173,566 |
