= Takuji Ichikawa =

Japanese novelist

- 市川拓司
- Born: October 7, 1962 (age 64); Tokyo, Japan
- Occupation: Novelist

Takuji Ichikawa (市川 拓司, Ichikawa Takuji; born 7 October 1962) is a Japanese novelist. Ichikawa's bestsellers include Ima ai ni yukimasu (いま、会いにゆきます, Be with You) (2003), Ren'ai shashin (Love's Photographs) (2003) and Sono Toki wa Kare ni Yoroshiku (Say Hello to Him When the Time Comes) (2004).

His works are also adapted for Japanese films such as Be with You (2004), Heavenly Forest (2006), and Japanese TV series 14 Months (2003). The 2004 film Be with You became a box office hit, thrusting him into the limelight. A 2018 South Korean remake of the same film was also a box office hit in South Korea.

In 2019 Ichikawa joined the curated group of award-winning Japanese authors, Red Circle Authors.

== Bibliography ==
=== Novels ===
- Separation, 2002
- Ima ai ni yukimasu (いま、会いにゆきます, Be with You), 2003
- Ren'ai shashin (Love's Photographs), 2003
- Sono Toki wa Kare ni Yoroshiku (Say Hello to Him When the Time Comes), 2004
- Oboete Itene—Akaibu Sei Monogatari (Forget Me Not ― A Tale of Archive Star), 2004
- Konnanimo yasashii, sekai no owari-kata (こんなにも優しい、世界の終わりかた, Such a Gentle Ending of the World), 2013

=== Short story collections ===
- Sekaiju ga ame dattara (If It Were Raining All Over the World)
- Boku no te wa kimi no tame ni (ぼくの手はきみのために, This Hand Exists for You), 2007

== Adaptations ==
=== Film ===
- Be with You (2004)
- Heavenly Forest (2006)
- Say Hello for Me (2007)

=== Television ===
- 14 Months (2003)
- Be with You, (2005)
