= World World World (Orange Range album) =

world world world

Studio album by Orange Range
- Released: August 5, 2009
- Genre: Alternative rock, pop rock, rap rock, industrial rock, grebo
- Label: SME/gr8! Records
- Producer: Satori Shiraishi

Orange Range chronology
Ura Shopping (2008)	world world world (2009)

world world world is Japanese alternative rock band Orange Range's eleventh major album. It peaked at number 4 on Oricon Albums Chart.

== Track listing ==
1. the map
2. FACTORY
3. KIMAGURE 23
4. Oshare Banchou feat. Soy Sauce (おしゃれ番長 Feat. ソイソース)
5. White Blood Ball Red Blood Ball ~Dub Mix~
6. Son of the Sun
7. Japoneze (ジャポネーゼ)
8. Space Girl feat. Petunia Rocks (Space Girl Feat. ペチュニアロックス)
9. Hitomi No Saki Ni (瞳の先に)
10. HIBISCUS
11. Oni Goroshi (鬼ゴロシ)
12. IKAROS
13. Fin.
