= Jasmine Ann Allen =

American singer

Jasmine Allen
- Born: Jasmine Ann Allen; September 1, 1985 (age 40)
- Other names: Jasmine; Jasmine Marika
- Occupations: Voice actress; singer; television personality
- Years active: 1995–present
- Musical career
- Genres: Pop; dance
- Instrument: Vocals
- Labels: R & C

Jasmine Ann Allen, also known as Jasmine Marika (Japanese: ジャスミン茉莉花) is an American voice actress, singer, and TV personality in Japan. Her first single with Japanese comedian Gorie topped the Japanese single chart for two weeks.

== Biography ==
Born in Washington, United States, Allen moved to Japan in 1993. In 1996, she started her acting career on the TV program Tensai TV kun (天才テレビくん) on NHK. She was the singing voice of Claris in Nights into Dreams and performed on the kids' version of the title song, "Dreams Dreams". She later returned to sing a new version in the Nights: Journey of Dreams video game entitled "Dreams Dreams: Sweet Snow".

Due to a throat dystonia, Allen has semi retired from voice acting into the 2010s, while attending therapy sessions to treat her condition. Allen continues work as a manager and translator at a Japanese narration agency.

== Filmography ==
=== Video games ===
- Nights Into Dreams... (1996)
- Front Mission 3 (1999)
- Shenmue II (2001) as Fangmei Xun
- Musashi: Samurai Legend (2005) as Princess Mycella
- Nights: Journey of Dreams (2007)

=== Television series ===
- Yūki o Dashite (1998) as Karen
- Tensai TV kun Wild Makai Dōmei (2001) as Allen

=== Variety programs ===
- Tensai TV kun (1996–1999)
- Tensai TV kun Wild (1999–2000)
- Tensai TV kun Wild MTK Classics (2002–2003)

=== Movies ===
- Ultraman Gaia: Gaia Again (2001)

== Discography ==
=== Albums ===
- Jasmine (2005)

=== Singles ===
Gorie with Jasmine & Joann

Title	Year	Peak	Certifications	Sales
Title	Year	JPN	Certifications	Sales
"Mickey"	2004	1	RIAJ: Platinum	
"Pecori Night"	2005	3	RIAJ: Platinum	JPN: 231,000
"Koi no Pecori Lesson"	2006	5	RIAJ: Gold	
