= Joann Yamazaki =

Joann Yukari Yamazaki (山崎 ジョアン 紫光, Yamazaki Joan Yukari), simply known as Joann (ジョアン), is Japanese tarento from Tokyo, Japan. She sings backing vocals for Gorie.

== Discography ==
=== Singles ===
- [2004.09.08] Mickey (September 8, 2004)
- [2005.09.14] Pecori♥Night (September 14, 2005)
- [2006.09.10] Koi no Pecori♥Lesson (恋の Pecori♥Lesson, Love's Pecori Lesson) (September 10, 2006)

== Filmography ==
=== TV shows ===
- 天才てれびくんワイド (NHK, April 2002 - March 2003)
- 天才てれびくんMAX (NHK, April 2003 - March 2005)
- One Night R&R (Fuji TV)

=== Video games ===
- Shenmue II (2001, voice for English version)
