= Televi-Kun =

Japanese manga magazine

- Categories: Children (male)
- Frequency: Monthly
- Circulation: 45,000; (July–September 2026)
- Publisher: Shogakukan
- First issue: May 1976
- Country: Japan
- Based in: Tokyo
- Language: Japanese

Televi-Kun (Japanese: てれびくん, Hepburn: Terebikun) is a Japanese monthly manga magazine published by Shogakukan, starting in May 1976. Its main target is preschool-aged boys. It features super heroes such as Ultraman, Kamen Rider, Super Sentai and Metal Hero, all of whom have gone on to be cultural phenomena in Japan.

The name is a portmanteau of televi, short for television, and kun, a Japanese honorific for small children, mainly young boys.
