= Gori (comedian) =

Japanese comedian (born 1972)

- Born: Toshiyuki Teruya; May 22, 1972 (age 54); Naha, Okinawa, Japan
- Other names: Gorie, Gorie Matsuura
- Occupations: comedian, variety show host, voice actor, film director, musician
- Years active: 1995–present
- Children: 2

Notes
- Same year/generation as: Terumoto Goto (Football Hour); Yoshimi Tokui (Tutorial)

Toshiyuki Teruya (照屋 年之, Teruya Toshiyuki; May 22, 1972 in Naha, Okinawa, Japan), better known as Gori (ゴリ) or Gorie (ゴリエ) or Gorie Matsuura (松浦ゴリエ, Matsuura Gorie), is a Japanese comedian, variety show host, voice actor, film director, and musician. He is a member of the owarai group Garage Sale. He has also appeared in drag as a schoolgirl character named Gorie and collaborated with Jasmine Ann Allen and Joann Yamazaki to release three singles. Mickey reached number one on the Oricon charts in 2004.

== Filmography ==
=== Television drama ===
- Churasan series (2001, 2003, 2004, 2007) – as Keishō Kohagura
- Oniyome nikki series (2005, 2007) – as Kazuma Yamasaki
- Ohitorisama (2009) – as Delivery Man
- Keiji Narusawa Ryō (2009) – as Edo
- Jidan Kōshōnin Gotakeshi (2011) – as Shingo Fujii
- Nobunaga no Chef (2013) as Toyotomi Hideyoshi

=== Movies ===
- Nin x Nin: Ninja Hattori-kun, the Movie (2004) – as Kemumaki Kenzō
- Check It Out, Yo! (2006) – as Hajime Genga
- Memories of Matsuko (2006) – as Shūji Ōkura
- Sakuran (2007) – as one of Ore-tachi
- Utatama (2008) – as Hiroshi Gondō
- Goemon (2009) – as Sarutobi Sasuke

=== TV shows ===
- Waratte Iitomo (2000–2014, Fuji Television)
- Adrena! Gallage (2004–2009, TV Asahi)
- Gori muchū (2007–present, Chūkyō Television Broadcasting)
- Oha Suta (2000–2008, TV Tokyo)
- One Night R&R (2000–2006, Fuji Television)

=== Anime film ===
- Summer Days with Coo (2007) – as Kijimunā

=== Anime television ===
- Kimba the White Lion (2009) – as Gorilla

=== Japanese dub ===
- The Pacifier (2007) – as Shane Wolfe (Vin Diesel)
- G-Force (2009) – as Darwin
- Jack the Giant Slayer (2013) – as General Fallon
- Fantastic Four (2015) – as The Thing

=== Director ===
- Detective Bogie (刑事ボギー, Keiji Bogī) (2006, Yoshimoto Kogyo)
- Bogie the Hero (ボギー☆ザ・ヒーロー, Bogī Za Hīrō) (2007, Yoshimoto Kogyo)
- Furimun of the South Island (南の島のフリムン, Minami no Shima no furimun) (2009, Kadokawa Pictures)
- Born Bone Born (洗骨) (2018, Phantom Film)

=== Endorsements ===
- Nintendo – Wii Fit
- Asahi Breweries – Chūhai Goricchu

== Discography ==
=== Singles ===
- Mickey (September 8, 2004)
- Pecori♥Night (September 14, 2005)
- Koi no Pecori♥Lesson (恋の Pecori♥Lesson, Love's Pecori Lesson) (September 10, 2006)
