= Hana (Orange Range song) =

Single by Orange Range
- Released: October 20, 2004
- Genre: J-pop, rock
- Length: 13:00
- Label: Sony Music Entertainment (Japan) Inc.

Orange Range singles chronology
"Rakuyou" (2003)	"Hana" (2004)	"Love Parade" (2005)

"Hana" ("Flower") is the eighth single by the Japanese band Orange Range. It was released in October 20, 2004. "Flower" was used as the theme song of the Japanese movie Ima, Ai ni Yukimasu, known in English as Be with You.

"Flower" was used as the eighth ending theme for the third season of Teasing Master Takagi-san (2022), covered by the main character's voice actor, Takahashi Rie. "Flower" was also used as the first ending theme for the original video animation of the 2016 anime, ReLIFE.

== Track listing ==
No.	Title	Length
1.	"Hana"	4:14
2.	"Kasou"	4:02
3.	"Hana" (original track)	5:13
Total length:		13:29

== Charts ==
Following its release, "Hana" ranked 4th in the Oricon charts. In 2005, it became Orange Range's most successful hit single, and reached the top of the annual karaoke rankings.
