= Orange Range =

Japanese rock band

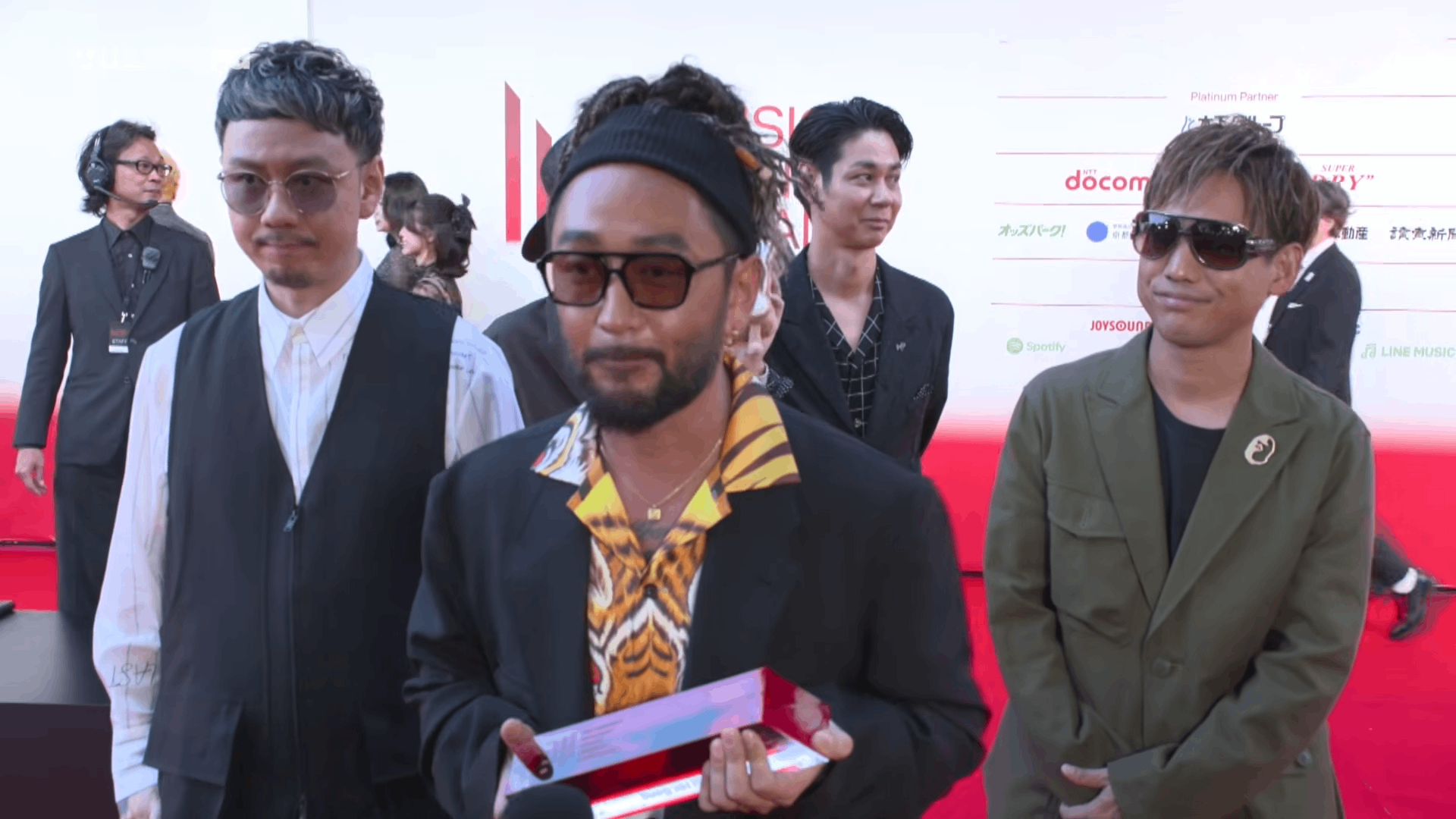
- Orange Range at the 2026 Music Awards Japan

Background information
- Origin: Okinawa, Japan
- Genres: Alternative rock; rap rock; pop punk; power pop
- Years active: 2001–present
- Labels: Spice Records (2002–2003); Gr8! Records (2003–2010); Super Echo Label (2010–present); Speedstar Records (2012–present)
- Members: Naoto Hiroyama; Ryo Miyamori; Yamato Ganeko; Hiroki Hokama; Yoh Miyamori
- Past members: Kazuhito Kitao
- Website: http://www.orangerange.com/

Orange Range (オレンジレンジ, Orenji Renji) is a Japanese rock band known for their strong Okinawan identity. Formed in 2001, the band began with Spice Music and later signed with Sony Music Japan's gr8! records division in 2003. The band left gr8! records in 2010 to start their own label, super Echo. In 2012, they signed with Victor Entertainment's Speedstar Records label.

== History ==
=== 2002 ===
The band has roots in Okinawa, an area famous for being the home of many well-known acts. Before they were signed by a major label, Orange Range played mostly in small art houses and clubs until they were found by a record agent. The band is mix of pop- and rock-style music as can be heard by the vocals and the instrumentals. Their style is also made up of many different cultures and musical styles from around the world. This is attributed to their hometown being Okinawa, a well-known station for American military bases and, thus, cultures and different styles often blend. Due to high sales of their works, Orange Range's singles are often attached to various movies, shows or Japanese products.

Originally, Orange Range was a cover band, doing mostly covers of songs by other artists. The band was started by childhood friends Kitao "Kat-chan" Kazuhito and Hiroyama Naoto, but Naoto has professed that Kazuhito was the one to come up with the idea of forming a band. Soon a longtime friend of Naoto, Miyamori Yoh, would join the band as a bassist. Unlike the current band members, the next band member to join, Hokama Hiroki, was relatively an "outsider" in the group of friends that made up the original band. Hiroki was also the first vocalist of the band. Next Miyamori Yoh invited his younger brother, Miyamori Ryo, to join the band as a low vocalist and the second overall vocalist. The band stayed like this for a few months before scouting high range vocalist, Yamato Ganeko to the band.

Between the time that Yamato joined and the band being signed to Spice Music's Japanese division, Orange Range mainly did covers of already famous singers and bands, like Glay and Mr. Children, for school concerts and for small art houses. In early 2002, the band was signed to Spice Music and released their first official commercial work, the mini-album Orange Ball, which contained the single Michishirube. The single peaked at No. 133 on the Oricon charts.

=== 2003 ===
In June 2003, the band signed with Sony Music and released their first wide release single, "Kirikirimai". The single only had a moderate amount of sales and peaked at No. 50 on the mainstream Oricon charts. The very next month though, any doubts of Orange Range being able to make it to the "big time" in the Japanese music scene were dashed when they released their second single, "Shanghai Honey", the single peaked at No. 5 on the Oricon charts. This was seen as a large feat for the band as the single had almost no promotion due to the low sales of Kirikirimai. A cover version of Shanghai Honey was also featured in the game Osu! Tatakae! Ouendan.

The band then released two more singles, "Viva Rock", in which the title song was used as the third ending to the anime Naruto, and "Rakuyō" which was used as commercial song for Daiichi Kosho Mero Dam. 1st Contact, the band's first full album, was then released in late 2003. It entered the charts at No. 2 and was only able to stay there for a single week. The album's sales dropped by nearly double in the time frame of a month. Even with the low sales, the album became the 15th highest selling album of 2004.

=== 2004 ===
In the time following their first album, the band re-released "Michishirube" and "Kirikirimai". During the same year, the band also performed "Kirikirimai (Fantastic Four Remix)" for the superhero film Fantastic Four and its soundtrack.

"Michishirube" was used as the ending theme to the popular J-Drama, Fire Boys: Megumi no Daigo, this version of the single went straight to No. 1 on the Oricon charts. It marked the first single from the band that was able to reach the coveted spot on the charts. The band's next single was "Locolotion", which rocked the group with plagiarism controversy and accusations. Even with what was seen as "bad media light" for the band, the single still reached the No. 1 spot, as would their next seven singles, making Orange Range the band with the longest streak of consecutive number one singles since the start of the new millennium.

The band's 9th single, "Hana", went on to become the highest selling single from the band; to date, the single has sold nearly 800,000 copies. This single also went on to become the number four highest selling single of 2004 and was able to stay on the Oricon charts for nearly 50 weeks. Hana was also used as the ending theme for the movie Ima, Ai ni Yukimasu. Their second album, MusiQ, debuted at the No. 2 spot on the Oricon charts. It only stayed at the spot for one week, as its second week saw the album climb to the number one spot. This would go on to become Orange Range's best selling album, claiming the number one spot for 2005.

=== 2005 ===
The band's next single, "Asterisk", was used as the first opening theme to the anime Bleach and went straight to No. 1 on the charts and was able to stay in the top 20 for 22 weeks. Because it was released in late 2005, it was counted as a 2005 album; often album sales for albums released late in the year are counted for next year's charts. "Asterisk", however, was counted in both 2005 and 2006. The album's chart run ended with over 900,000 sales and was the 11th highest selling album of 2005.

The band then somewhat slowed down as they had what many fans called a "face change." This was because founding member, Kitao Kazuhito, left the band in the middle of 2005. At first it was reported by the Japanese media that he left the band due to tendinitis that had increased in severity. It was later revealed that he left the band due to "creative differences," it was said that Kazuhito did not like that the band was moving more and more to hip-hop and away from rock.

=== 2006 ===
The band finally returned to the studio and release their first single of 2006, "Champione", in mid-2006. "Un Rock Star", the band's next single, would break the string of consecutive number one singles. The single debuted at No. 3 and never rose higher. However, this single had a limited release, with only 100,000 copies made.

The band's 16th single is titled "Sayonara", contrary to rumors of this being the band's final single, this is supposed to mark the second phase of the band's life, thus they are saying goodbye to the first phase. "Sayonara" was used as the theme song for the TBS drama Teppan Shōjo Akane!!. In addition, the band has also created new songs with commercial tie-ins, one titled "Dance2" to be used in a Pocky advertisement (and the song was used in Japanese DS game Taiko no Tatsujin) and the other called "Hello", which will be used by the Disney Channel.

Their fourth album, the self-titled Orange Range was released on December 6, 2006; it contained 17 tracks; three were re-releases and 14 were new tracks. Even with a No. 2 peak, this was the band's lowest charting album in four years, as well as their lowest selling album to date.

Orange Range performed at Music Station Super Live 2006 on December 22. Music Station is a long-running Japanese music television program that holds a "Super Live" extended edition to celebrate Christmas and the end of the year every December. This was the second year in a row that Orange Range was invited.

=== 2007 ===
Their 17th single, "Ika Summer", was released in April and had a weekly peak of No. 3 on Oricon. This was the band's lowest selling and charting single in years, only staying in the top five for one week.

July saw three major releases from Orange Range. To celebrate their 5th anniversary, the band released two separate best albums entitled Orange and Range, each containing a different selection of their hit singles and popular album tracks. On the first day of their release, Orange and Range would obtain the top two spots on the Oricon charts and the same spots on the weekly charts. Two weeks later, the albums would go on to obtain the top two spots in the United World Music charts. Their next single, "Ikenai Taiyō", was used as the opening theme to the J-Drama adaptation of the popular manga series Hana-Kimi. "Ikenai Taiyō" would go on to have to obtain the No. 3 spot on Oricon in its first week, obtaining the band's highest sales in a year.

=== 2008 ===
The band's first single of the year, "Kimi Station", was released on March 5, 2008. The band also performed the opening and ending themes to the Sunrise anime series, Code Geass: Lelouch of the Rebellion R2. They are titled "O2" (02~ｵｰ･ﾂｰ~, Ō Tsū) and "Shiawase Neiro" (シアワセネイロ). The song "O2" was released as a single late May. "Shiawase Neiro" was included on Orange Range's fifth studio album, Panic Fancy, which was released on July 9, 2008 and immediately topped the Oricon Album Charts on its launch date. The DVD version of the album also included an Orange Range Code Geass: Lelouch of the Rebellion R2 commercial, along with the music videos for its single releases. The band's next single "Oshare Banchou feat. Soy Sauce" was released on November 12 in CD and CD+DVD formats. Shortly after, a B-sides double album entitled Ura Shopping was released on December 3.

=== 2009 ===
Orange Range started 2009 with the release of their Orange Range Live Tour 008: Panic Fancy DVD. The DVD features footage from the final day of their concert performance at Nippon Budokan. "Hitomi no Saki ni" (瞳の先に), Orange Range's newest single after approximately 8 months was released on July 8 in CD and CD+DVD formats. It features a ballad. Another song titled "Oni Goroshi" (鬼ゴロシ) which translates to Demon Slayer, will be the ending theme song of the movie The Good, the Bad, the Weird. "Oni Goroshi" is an upbeat song on the lines of GOD69 and Chest. The band's 6th album entitled World World World was released on August 5 in both CD and DVD formats featuring Hitomi no Saki ni, Oni Goroshi, Oshare Banchou and 10 all new songs for a total of 13 tracks. Best of Albums Orange and Range were re-released on September 2 in the new Blu-spec CD format.

=== 2010 ===
On February 20 at the Saitama Super Arena, Orange Range performed Carnival - Haru no Saiten Special; the band released the concert footage on DVD on June 9 of the same year. Shortly after on July 14, the band released their newest best hits album titled All the Singles; the album has a limited-edition version that contains music videos for each song on the regular cd. That same day, Orange Range also released ORANGE RANGE world world world TOUR VS Nagoya ELL, which is a DVD from the World World World tour. On July 28, the band left former label Gr8! Records, and established their own record label Super Echo Label. Following the change in record label, Orange Range released the singles Uturusanu (July 28) and Ya-Ya-Ya (September 22). The band released a new studio album on October 20: orcd. Five days later, Orange Range held their first free live concert in five years when they performed Onegai! Senorita. The band also announced a nationwide tour titled LIVE TOUR 010-011 "orcd" from November 17, 2010 to March 8, 2011.

=== 2011 ===
After the Great East Japan earthquake struck on March 11, 2011, Orange Range released a single titled "one" on March 26. The song was written for the victims of the earthquake, and it was available for free download on the band's website. In response to the song release, Orange Range left this message on their page: "What we can do is to deliver music. Everyday [sic], the television broadcasts footage that feels detached from reality. We were shocked to see people helping with the rescue efforts there, bravely and cheerfully, despite being victims themselves. We were touched by those people, and decided to write this song. It's a small power, but we want to walk forward together. Let's sing together." Also, the band announced additional performances for their LIVE TOUR 010-011 "orcd" renaming the remainder of the tour LIVE TOUR 011 orcd "one"; the tour was extended from April 15 to July 22. From August 10 to August 30, Orange Range held a concept tour for their fan club titled RANGE AID + presents: RWD ← SCREAM 01.

=== 2012 ===
Orange Range kicked off 2012 by switching their label again. On January 10, the band switched from "SUPER ECHO LABEL" to SPEEDSTAR RECORDS. The year 2012 was the band's 10th anniversary, so to celebrate this, Orange Range released a new single "Anniversary Song ~ 10th" for free release. The band also announced a new album and a new tour to celebrate their anniversary. On April 18, Orange Range released their new studio album Neo Pop Standard; the band also announced the new nationwide tour LIVE TOUR 012 "NEO POP STANDARD" The tour was held from May 10 to August 19.

=== 2013 ===
From January 31 to February 23, Orange Range held yet another concept tour titled RANGE AID + presents" RWD ← SCREAM 013. Then from March 18 to March 21, the band held an exclusive tour for their fan club called "ORANGE RANGE FC TOUR SHOWCASE LIVE 013"; this tour was done in Tokyo, Osaka, and Nagoya. After months of touring, Orange Range released their first single in 3 years 9 months. The new single, Oborona Ageha/Moshimo, peaked at the 18th place on the Oricon charts. On May 30, the band announced a new album and a nationwide tour. Their new studio album, spark, was successfully released on July 24, 2013. On the same date, Orange Range released their new tour DVD "Orange Range Live Tour 012: Neo Pop Standard" on the Japanese iTunes storefront. The band also released "spark" and "Neo Pop Standard" on iTunes worldwide, marking the first time Orange Range has released one of its albums for worldwide, digital release. A week after spark was released, Oricon charts indicated that the album had only managed to reach the 18th spot before falling from the Top 30. This indication makes "spark" Orange Range's lowest ranking studio album on the Oricon charts since "1st Contact". In July, Naoto Hiroyama and Hiroki Hokama formed a separate group from the band as a side project called NaotoHiroki & Karatesystems. The side project was headed by Naoto and Hiroki, and the premise behind it is an international collaboration on a series of songs. After working with many international artists on the album "Travel Sounds", Naoto commented "I want to collaborate with more people for a unique worldview." From September 14 to December 22, Orange Range conducted their ORANGE RANGE LIVE TOUR 013 ～spark.

=== 2014 ===
Beginning in 2014, Orange Range announced for the first time a tour of Asian countries. ORANGE RANGE ASIA LIVE 014 held venues in Hong Kong, Taiwan, and South Korea; the tour was held between February 14 and February 23. From April 2 to May 31, Orange Range held their annual fan club tour with RANGE AID + presents ORANGE RANGE FC TOUR 014. To mark the 10th volume of Embu, a battle of the bands event started by Orange Range, the band announced a special Embu tour. The tour is set as a battle of the bands with Orange Range going against another band at each different venue.

=== 2018 ===
On August 29, 2018 the band released their eleventh album, Eleven Piece. It was their first studio album produced in three years, and was released simultaneously in Japan and Taiwan. A showcase concert took place on August 23, and a 30-concert tour supporting the new album commenced on September 28 in Taiwan at the Legacy Taipei.

=== 2021 ===
Orange Range Celebrated their 20th anniversary.

=== 2025 ===
Orange Range continues broadcasts on Okinawa Radio (Okiraji) weekly. In February, they collaborated with TOTALFAT.

== Members ==
Current

- Naoto Hiroyama - guitar
- Ryo Miyamori - low vocals, MC
- Yamato Ganeko - high vocals, MC
- Hiroki Hokama - mid-range vocals, MC
- Yoh Miyamori - bass guitar

Former

- Kitao Kazuhito "Katchan" - drums

== Discography ==
=== Albums ===
Title	Details	Peak chart positions	Sales	Certifications
Title	Details	JPN	Sales	Certifications
Orange Ball (オレンジボール)	Released: February 22, 2002	—		
1st Contact	Released: December 17, 2003	2	690,282	RIAJ: 3× Platinum (phy.)
musiQ	Released: December 1, 2004	1	2,630,763	RIAJ: 2× Million (phy.)
Natural	Released: October 18, 2005	1	919,650	RIAJ: Million (phy.)
Squeezed	Released: April 12, 2006	7	70,190	RIAJ: Gold (phy.)
Orange Range	Released: December 6, 2006	2	347,832	RIAJ: Platinum (phy.)
Orange	Released: July 25, 2007	2	387,105	RIAJ: 2× Platinum (phy.)
Range	Released: July 25, 2007	1	408,665	RIAJ: 2× Platinum (phy.)
Panic Fancy	Released: July 9, 2008	1	120,370	RIAJ: Gold (phy.)
Ura Shopping	Released: December 3, 2008	7		
World World World	Released: August 5, 2009	4	42,539	
All the Singles	Released: July 14, 2010	7	29,677	
Ordl	Released: September 22, 2010	—		
Orcd	Released: October 20, 2010	9	16,023	
Neo Pop Standard	Released: April 18, 2012	6		
Spark	Released: July 24, 2013	18		
Ten	Released: August 26, 2015	16		
Enban (縁盤)	Released: July 20, 2016	12		
Eleven Piece	Released: August 29, 2018	20		
Naked X Refinished 3 Mics and Back Sounds	Released: December 25, 2020	—		
Double Circle	Released: September 14, 2022	20		

=== Extended plays ===
Title	Details	Peak chart positions	Sales	Certifications
Title	Details	JPN	Sales	Certifications
Michishirube – A Road Home	Released: February 25, 2004	1	278,193	
Locolotion	Released: June 9, 2004	1	492,695	
Chest	Released: August 25, 2004	1	116,206	
Asterisk	Released: February 23, 2005	1	628,329	
Kizuna	Released: August 24, 2005	1	412,948	
Un Rock Star	Released: August 30, 2006	3	79,683	RIAJ: Gold (phy.)
Sushi Tabetai	Released: July 18, 2015	—		
Unity	Released: November 1, 2017	23		
Labyrinth	Released: October 1, 2021	—		

=== Singles ===
List of singles, showing year released, select chart positions, sales, certifications, and album name
Title	Year	Peak chart positions		Sales	Certifications	Album
Title	Year	JPN	JPN Hot	Sales	Certifications	Album
"Michishirube/Midnight Gauge" (ミチシルベ/ミッドナイトゲージ)	2002	133	—			Non-album single
"Kirikirimai" (キリキリマイ)	2003	50	—	JPN: 20,206		1st Contact
"Shanghai Honey" (上海ハニー)	2003	5	—	JPN: 240,831	RIAJ: Platinum (phy.); Gold (st.)	1st Contact
"Viva★Rock" (ビバ★ロック)	2003	3	—	JPN: 163,483	RIAJ: Gold (phy.)	1st Contact
"Rakuyou" (落陽)	2003	10	—	JPN: 46,779	RIAJ: Gold (phy.)	1st Contact
"Michishirube ~a road home~" (ミチシルベ ~a road home~)	2004	1	—		RIAJ: Platinum (phy.); Gold (dig.)	MusiQ
"Locolotion" (ロコローション)	2004	1	—		RIAJ: 2× Platinum (phy.); Gold (dig.)	MusiQ
"Chest" (チェスト)	2004	1	—			MusiQ
"Flower" (花)	2004	1	47	JPN: 999,789	RIAJ: Million (phy.); 3× Platinum (dig.); Platinum (st.)	MusiQ
"*~Asterisk~" (＊〜アスタリスク〜)		1	—	JPN: 628,329	RIAJ: 2× Platinum (phy.)	Natural
"Love Parade" (ラヴ・パレード)	2005	1	—	JPN: 447,393	RIAJ: 2× Platinum (phy.)	Natural
"Onegai! Señorita" (お願い!セニョリータ)	2005	1	—	JPN: 417,464	RIAJ: 2× Platinum (phy.); Platinum (dig.)	Natural
"Kizuna" (キズナ)	2005	1	—		RIAJ: 2× Platinum (phy.)	Natural
"Champione"	2006	1	—	JPN: 220,955	RIAJ: Platinum (phy.); Platinum (dig.)	Orange Range
"Un Rock Star"	2006	3	—			Orange Range
"Sayonara"	2006	3	—	JPN: 105,399	RIAJ: Gold (phy.)	Orange Range
"Ika Summer" (イカSummer)	2007	3	—	JPN: 50,487	RIAJ: Gold (phy.)	Panic Fancy
"Ikenai Taiyō" (イケナイ太陽)	2007	3	15	JPN: 162,087	RIAJ: Gold (phy.); 3× Platinum (dig.); 2× Platinum (st.)	Panic Fancy
"Kimi Station" (君Station)	2008	2	55	JPN: 47,763	RIAJ: Gold (phy.)	Panic Fancy
"O2"	2008	3	2	JPN: 106,295	RIAJ: Gold (phy.)	Panic Fancy
"Happy Sound" (シアワセネイロ)	2008	—	63			Panic Fancy
"Oshare Banchou" (おしゃれ番長) (featuring Soy Sauce)	2008	5	7			World World World
"Hitomi no Sakini" (瞳の先に)	2009	6	11	JPN: 23,338		World World World
"Uturusanu" (ウトゥルサヌ)	2010	—	—			Orcd
"Ya-Ya-Ya" (ヤーヤーヤー)	2010	—	—			Orcd
"One"	2011		—			
"Anniversary Song 〜10th〜"	2012	—	—			Neo Pop Standard
"Sadistic Summer" (サディスティックサマー) (Note: Limited release)	2012	—	—			Spark
"Oborona Ageha/Mo Shi Mo"	2013	18	—			Spark
"Ishin Denshin X Mongol800"	2016	—	—			Enban
"Chira Chira Rhythm" (チラチラリズム)	2017	—	—			Unity
"Hopping"	2018	—	—			Eleven Piece
"Ryukyu Wind"	2018	—	—			Eleven Piece
"Family"	2018	—	—			Double Circle
"Enjoy!"	2019	—	—			Naked X Refinished 3 Mics and Back Sounds
"Naked"	2020	—	—			Naked X Refinished 3 Mics and Back Sounds
"Konohoshi"	2020	—	—			Double Circle
"Kibunjoujou"	2020	—	—			Double Circle
"Imagine"	2020	—	—			Double Circle
"Health"	2021	—	—			Double Circle
"Kirisaite Kaze" (キリサイテ 風)	2022	—	—			Double Circle
"Pantyna" (featuring Soy Sauce)	2022	—	—			Double Circle
"Kaiho Carnival" (解放カーニバル)	2023	—	—			
"Specter"	2023	—	—			
"Zombie"	2024	—	—			
"Sanshin Punk" (三線Punk)	2024	—	—			
"Majide Sekai Kaechau 5 Byō Mae" (マジで世界変えちゃう5秒前)	2025	29	—			
"Hadashi no Ceccoli" (裸足のチェッコリー)	2025	—	—			
"Towanohikari" (トワノヒカリ)	2025	33	—			
"Mensore" (メンソーレ) (featuring Soy Sauce)	2026	—	—			
"Dramatic Heibon" (ドラマティック平凡)	2026	—	—			
"1000%"	2026	—	—			
"Curry Tabetai" (Curry食べたい) (featuring Soy Sauce)	2026	—	—			
"—" denotes releases that did not chart or were not released in that region.

=== DVDs ===
1. Video la Contact (ヴィデオ・ラ・コンタクト) (July 28, 2004)
2. Video de Recital (ヴィデヲ・DE・リサイタル) (April 27, 2005)
3. Live MusiQ – from Live Tour 005 "MusiQ" at Makuhari Messe 2005.04.01 (December 21, 2005)
4. Live Natural – from Live Tour 005 "Natural" at Yokohama Arena 2005.12.13 (September 20, 2006)
5. Orange Range Live Tour 006: Fantazical (December 5, 2007)
6. Orange Range Live Tour 008: Panic Fancy (April 8, 2009)
7. Orange Range Carnival: Haru no Saiten Special (June 9, 2010)
8. Orange Range World World World Tour vs Nagoya ELL (July 14, 2010)
9. Orange Range Live Tour 012: Neo Pop Standard (July 24, 2013)
