= Be with You (2004 film) =

- Japanese release poster
- Japanese: いま、会いにゆきます
- Directed by: Nobuhiro Doi
- Written by: Yoshikazu Okada
- Based on: Be with You by Takuji Ichikawa
- Produced by: Hideyuki Honma
- Starring: Yūko Takeuchi; Shido Nakamura
- Cinematography: Takahide Shibanushi
- Edited by: Shinichi Hiroshi
- Music by: Suguru Matsutani
- Distributed by: Toho
- Release date: 30 October 2004 (Japan)
- Running time: 119 minutes
- Country: Japan
- Language: Japanese
- Box office: US$46.6 million

Be with You (Japanese: いま、会いにゆきます, Hepburn: Ima, Ai ni Yukimasu) is a 2004 Japanese drama film based on a Japanese novel of the same name written by Takuji Ichikawa. The film was adapted from the novel by Yoshikazu Okada, and it was directed by Nobuhiro Doi. It stars actress Yūko Takeuchi as Mio Aio and actor Shido Nakamura as Takumi Aio.

Be with You was first released at the 17th Tokyo International Film Festival. It was subsequently released in Japanese cinemas on 30 October 2004. The film grossed a total of $46,616,207 from its screenings in Japan and overseas countries.

== Plot ==
Mio Aio's death leaves her husband Takumi and six-year-old son Yuji to eke a living for themselves. Takumi is disorganized in household chores, suffers occasional fainting spells, and fears that his health could not fulfill his dead wife's happiness. Yuji overhears relatives gossiped that his own difficult delivery compromised Mio's health, and blames himself for his mother's death. Mio had left Yuji a picture book; in the book, Mio departs for a celestial body she calls "the Archive Star" but reappears in Japan during the following year's rainy season; turning the pages, Yuji eagerly awaits her return.

On a walk in the forest outside their house, Takumi and Yuji find a woman sheltered from the rain, and immediately accept her as Mio. She has no memory or sense of identity; she comes home to live with the father and son anyway. This new Mio asks Taku how they met and fell in love, and he recounts a tale of years of missed chances, beginning in high school and when she encouraged their marriage some time later. As the rainy season draws to a close, Yuji discovers the "time capsule" he hid with his mother before her death. Mio's diary is inside, and its version of the Mio-Taku romance holds the answers to the mystery.

== Cast ==
- Yūko Takeuchi as Mio Aio (秋穂澪)
- Shido Nakamura as Takumi Aio (秋穂巧)
- Akashi Takei as Yuji Aio (秋穂佑司), the 6-year-old son of Mio Aio and Takumi Aio.
- Karen Miyama as Aya, Yuji's classmate
- Yosuke Asari as Takumi in his high school days
- Yuuta Hiraoka as Yuji when he becomes 18 years old
- Chihiro Otsuka as Mio in high school days
- Mikako Ichikawa as Midori Nagase (永瀬みどり), Takumi's co-worker
- Katsuo Nakamura as Takumi's Boss
- You as Yuji's teacher
- Suzuki Matsuo as the owner of a cake shop
- Fumiyo Kohinata as Dr. Noguchi (野口医師)
- Kei Tanaka as Mio's university friend

== Release ==
Be with You was showcased at the 17th Tokyo International Film Festival on 27 October 2004. It was featured as one of the festival's special screenings. The singers for the theme song, Orange Range, also held a performance of the theme song at the showcase.

== Theme song ==
Okinawan alternative rock band Orange Range sang the theme song of this movie called Hana. It was the top selling single of 2005.

== Remakes ==
A 10 episode Japanese TV series starring Rie Mimura and Hiroki Narimiya was released by TBS from July 3 to September 18, 2005.

A South Korean remake starring So Ji-sub and Son Ye-jin was released on March 14, 2018.
