= Panic Fancy =

Studio album by Orange Range
- Released: July 9, 2008
- Genres: Alternative rock, pop rock, noise rock, grebo
- Length: 62:35
- Label: gr8! Records
- Producer: Satori Shiraishi

Orange Range chronology
Range (2007)	Panic Fancy (2008)	Ura Shopping (2008)

Panic Fancy (stylized in all caps) is Japanese alternative rock (a.k.a. mixture rock) band Orange Range's ninth major album. Upon its launch on July 9, 2008, Panic Fancy topped the Japanese Oricon Album Charts at #1 position.

The album features both opening and ending themes to the Sunrise anime Code Geass: Lelouch of the Rebellion R2, "O2" and "Shiawase Neiro", respectively, and also includes a special commercial for Code Geass: Lelouch of the Rebellion R2 featuring Orange Range in the special-edition DVD version.

== Track listing ==
All tracks are written by Orange Range.

Standard edition
No.	Title	Length
1.	"Beat it"	3:23
2.	"Ikenai Taiyou"	3:59
3.	"Sekai World Uchinanchu Kikou ~Shiimii Hen~"	3:00
4.	"Kimi station"	5:01
5.	"Soy Sauce VS Petunia Rocks"	3:51
6.	"Sunny Stripe"	3:53
7.	"Genjitsu Touhi"	4:15
8.	"Shiawase Neiro"	4:15
9.	"5"	6:05
10.	"O2"	3:57
11.	"Ika Summer"	3:58
12.	"Taiyou to Himawari, Mawari Nanka Ki ni Sezu ni... Natsu."	3:44
13.	"Fuyumi"	5:34
14.	"Doremifa Ship"	4:10
15.	"Happy Birthday Yeah! Yeah! Wow! Wow!"	3:50
Total length:		62:35

Special DVD edition
No.	Title	Length
1.	"Ika Summer"	4:05
2.	"Ikenai Taiyou"	4:02
3.	"Kimi station"	5:37
4.	"O2"	4:58
5.	"Shiawase Neiro"	6:15
6.	"Orange Range-featured Code Geass: Lelouch of the Rebellion R2 commercial"	1:28
Total length:		89:00
