= Thelma Aoyama discography =

- Studio albums: 8
- Extended plays: 2
- Compilation albums: 8
- Tribute albums: 1
- Singles: 37
- Video albums: 2

The discography of Japanese singer Thelma Aoyama consists of seven studio albums, six compilation albums, one extended play, one remix album, one cover album, two video albums and numerous solo and collaboration singles. Aoyama debuted as a musician in 2007 under Universal Music Japan sublabel Universal J, and became famous through her collaboration song with rapper SoulJa, "Koko ni Iru yo". Aoyama's version "Soba ni Iru ne" became one of the most successful songs of all time in Japan, certified for three million ringtone downloads and three million downloads by the RIAJ.

== Studio albums ==
List of albums, with selected chart positions
Title	Album details	Peak positions			Sales (JPN) (Note: Sales provided by Oricon database and are rounded to the nearest thousand copies.)	Certifications
Title	Album details	JPN	TWN	TWN East Asian (Note: Week references for G-Music: Diary 2008 week 20 and 2008 week 21, Love!: Thelma Love Song Collection 2009 week 8, Emotions 2009 week 38, Will, Singles Best.)	Sales (JPN)	Certifications
Diary	Released: March 26, 2008 (JPN); Label: Universal J; Formats: CD, digital download	3	16	2	374,000	RIAJ: Platinum
Emotions	Released: September 9, 2009 (JPN); Label: Universal J; Formats: CD, digital download, streaming	11	—	11	37,000	
Will	Released: June 15, 2011 (JPN); Label: Universal J; Formats: CD, digital download, streaming	61	—	4	3,000	
Lonely Angel	Released: August 6, 2014 (JPN); Label: Universal J; Formats: CD, digital download, streaming	183	—	—	400	
10th Diary	Released: September 6, 2017 (JPN); Label: Universal J; Formats: CD, digital download, streaming	65	—	—	2,000	
High School Gal	Released: July 26, 2018 (JPN); Label: Universal J; Formats: CD, digital download, streaming	56	—	—		
Scorpion Moon	Released: October 27, 2021; Label: Universal J; Formats: CD, digital download, streaming	218	—	—		
Easy Mode	Released: February 19, 2025; Label: NDY; Formats: Digital download, streaming	TBA				
"—" denotes items that did not chart, were released before the creation of the Billboard Japan Hot Albums chart, or were not released in that region.

== Compilation albums ==
List of albums, with selected chart positions
Title	Album details	Peak positions				Sales (JPN)	Certifications
Title	Album details	JPN	KOR Overseas (Note: The Gaon Albums Chart was established in 2010.) (Note: Week references for Gaon: "Fall in Love", Love Story, Singles Best.)	TWN	TWN East Asian	Sales (JPN)	Certifications
Love!: Thelma Love Song Collection	Released: February 11, 2009 (JPN); Label: Universal; Formats: CD, digital download	1	—	14	2	104,000	RIAJ: Gold
Love! 2: Thelma Best Collaborations	Released: July 28, 2010 (JPN); Label: Universal; Formats: CD, digital download	34	—	—	—	8,000	
Love Story	Released: April 25, 2011 (KOR); Label: Universal; Formats: CD, digital download	—	29	—	—		
Singles Best	Released: August 4, 2011 (JPN); Label: Universal; Formats: CD, digital download	41	36	—	17	6,000	
Ballad	Released: June 26, 2013 (JPN); Label: Universal; Formats: CD, digital download	—	—	—	—		
Up Beat	Released: June 26, 2013 (JPN); Label: Universal; Formats: CD, digital download	—	—	—	—		
Love! ~Special~	Released: April 27, 2016 (JPN); Label: Universal; Formats: CD, digital download	—	—	—	—		
Smoke & Tears	Released: April 27, 2016 (JPN); Label: Universal; Formats: CD, digital download	—	—	—	—		
"—" denotes items which were released before the creation of the Gaon charts, items that did not chart or items that were not released in that region.

== Cover albums ==
List of albums, with selected chart positions
Title	Album details	Peak positions	Sales (JPN)
Title	Album details	JPN	Sales (JPN)
My Covers	Released: November 14, 2012 (JPN); Label: Universal; Formats: CD, digital download	78	2,000

== Extended plays ==
List of extended plays, with selected chart positions
Title	Album details	Peak positions	Sales (JPN)
Title	Album details	JPN	Sales (JPN)
Gray Smoke	Released: September 16, 2015 (JPN); Label: Universal; Formats: CD, digital download	203	400
Pink Tears	Released: April 27, 2016 (JPN); Label: Universal; Formats: CD, digital download	262	

== Remix albums ==
List of albums, with selected chart positions
Title	Album details	Peak positions	Sales (JPN)
Title	Album details	JPN	Sales (JPN)
Party Party: Thelma Remix	Released: December 10, 2008 (JPN); Label: Universal; Formats: CD, digital download	79	4,000

== Singles ==
=== As a lead artist ===
List of singles, with selected chart positions
Title	Year	Peak chart positions						Sales (JPN)	Certifications	Album
Title	Year	JPN	JPN Hot 100 (Note: Sources for chart positions are as follows: "Soba ni Iru ne", "Diary", "Mama e", "Nando mo", "Mamoritai Mono", "Daikkirai Demo Arigato", "Todoketai...", "Wasurenai yo", "Happiness", "Fall in Love", "Kaeru Basho", "Summer Love", "Let's Party!", "Zutto.", "Without U", "Kimi ni Aeru Kara...", "Stay"., Stay with Me)	KOR Album	KOR Overseas Album	KOR Single	KOR Overseas Single	Sales (JPN)	Certifications	Album
"One Way"	2007	98	—	—	—	—	—	4,000		Diary
"Soba ni Iru ne" (そばにいるね; "I'm by Your Side") (featuring SoulJa)	2008	1	1	—	—	—	—	465,000	RIAJ (ringtone): 3× Million; RIAJ (digital): 3× Million; RIAJ (physical): 2× Platinum; RIAJ (streaming): Platinum	Diary
"Nando mo" (何度も; "How Many Times")	2008	6	3	—	—	—	—	68,000	RIAJ (ringtone): 3× Platinum; RIAJ (cellphone): 2× Platinum; RIAJ (physical): Gold	Love!
"Mamoritai Mono" (守りたいもの; "One I Want to Protect")	2008	18	4	—	—	—	—	17,000	RIAJ (cellphone): Gold	Love!
"Daikkirai Demo Arigato" (大っきらい でもありがと; "I Hate You, But Thanks")	2008	14	3	—	—	—	—	20,000	RIAJ (cellphone): Platinum	Love!
"Kono Mama Zutto" (このまま ずっと; "Always Like This")	2009	32	—	—	—	—	—	6,000		Love!
"Todoketai..." (届けたい...; "I Want To Reach You...") (featuring Ken the 390)	2009	32	21	—	—	—	—	6,000		Emotions
"Wasurenai yo" (忘れないよ; "I Won't Forget")	2009	20	13	—	—	—	—	11,000	RIAJ (cellphone): Gold	Emotions
"Fall in Love" (Thelma Aoyama x Sol from Big Bang)	2010	29	9	93	22	62	4	5,000		Love! 2
"Kaeru Basho" (帰る場所; "The Place We'll Return To")	2010	63	26	—	—	—	—	2,000		Non-album single
"Summer Love!!" (featuring Red Rice from Shōnan no Kaze)	2010	58	23	—	—	—	—	2,000		Love! 2
"Let's Party"	2010	162	33	—	—	—	—	400		Will
"23"	2010	162	—	—	—	—	—	400		Will
"Zutto." (ずっと.; "Always.")	2011	33	18	—	—	—	—	5,000	RIAJ (cellphone): Gold	Will
"Without U" (featuring 4Minute)	2011	125	70	—	—	—	—	600		Will
"Kimi ni Aeru Kara..." (君に会えるから; "Because I Can Meet You") (featuring Spicy Chocolate, Ryo the Skywalker)	2012	181	61	—	—	—	—	300		Word Piece
"My Only Lover"	2017	—	—	—	—	—	—			Highschool Gal
"Sekai no Chūsin (We Are the World)" (世界の中心; "The Center of the World (We Are the World)")	2018	—	—	—	—	—	—			Highschool Gal
"In this Place"	2019	55	—	—	—	—	—	600		Ralph Breaks the Internet (Original Motion Picture Soundtrack)
"Uchirano Irubasho Zenbu Sekaiisan" (ウチらのいる場所ぜんぶ世界遺産)	2019	—	—	—	—	—	—			Non-album single
"Ikiterudakede Gohoubi" (生きてるだけでご褒美)	2019	—	—	—	—	—	—			Scorpion Moon
"1LDK"	2019	—	—	—	—	—	—			Scorpion Moon
"Yours Forever" (featuring Aisho Nakajima)	2021	—	—	—	—	—	—			Scorpion Moon
"No No No"	2021	—	—	—	—	—	—			Scorpion Moon
"Itsumademo" (いつまでも) (featuring SoulJa)	2022	—	—	—	—	—	—			Non-album single
"Otsu" (乙) (featuring Nene)	2024	—	—	—	—	—	—			Easy Mode
"Where U R"	2024	—	—	—	—	—	—			Easy Mode
"Hai?" (featuring Nishi Hiroto)	2025	—	—	—	—	—	—			Easy Mode
"Easy Mode"	2025	—	—	—	—	—	—			Easy Mode
"—" denotes items which were released before the creation of the Billboard Japan Hot 100 or items that did not chart.

=== As a featured artist ===
List of singles, with selected chart positions
Title	Year	Peak chart positions				Sales (JPN)	Certifications	Album
Title	Year	JPN	JPN Hot 100 (Note: Sources for chart positions are as follows: "Koko ni Iru yo", "Garden of Love", "Yakusoku no Hi", "Hanasanaide yo",)	JPN RIAJ monthly ringtones (Note: The RIAJ "Reco-kyō" monthly ringtone chart is a depreciated chart that ran from 2006 until 2009.) (Note: Sources for chart positions are as follows: "Koko ni Iru yo", "Diary", "Anata ni Aete Yokatta", "Garden of Love", "Mama e", "Mirai Yosōzu II", "Yakusoku no Hi", "Todoketakute...", "Suki Desu.", "Party Party (Thelma Remix)".)	JPN RIAJ Digital Track Chart (Note: The RIAJ Digital Track Chart is a depreciated chart that ran from 2009 until early 2012 and tracked full-length cellphone downloads.) (Note: Sources for chart positions are as follows: "Dreamlover", "Futari no Yakusoku no Hi", "Happiness", "Come Again", "Hanasanai yo", "This Love", "Kimi ni Aitai...", "Love Trap".)	Sales (JPN)	Certifications	Album
"Summer Paradise (Risin' to tha Sun)" (DS455 featuring Thelma Aoyama)	2007	42	—	—	—	6,000		Risin' to tha Sun
"Koko ni Iru yo" (ここにいるよ; "I'm Here") (SoulJa featuring Thelma Aoyama)	2007	6	77 (Note: Released before the creation of the Billboard Japan Hot 100)	3	—	149,000	RIAJ (ringtone): Million; RIAJ (cellphone): Million; RIAJ (PC): Gold; RIAJ (physical): Gold	Spirits
"Garden of Love" (Makai featuring Thelma Aoyama)	2008	—	12	40	—			Garden
"Forever Love" (Roma Tanaka featuring Thelma Aoyama)	2008	72	—	—	—	2,000		Daybreak
"Yakusoku no Hi" (約束の日; "Promise Day") (Dohzi-T featuring Thelma Aoyama)	2008	—	42	10	—		RIAJ (cellphone): Gold	12 Love Stories
"Todoketakute..." (届けたくて; "I Want to Be Able to Reach You") (Ken the 390 featuring Thelma Aoyama)	2009	74	— (Note: Charted at number 94 on the Hot Singles Sales chart.)	58	—	1,000		New Order
"Dreamlover" (DJ Makidai featuring Thelma Aoyama)	2009	—	— (Note: Charted at number 36 on the Adult Contemporary Airplay chart and number 91 on the Hot Airplay chart.)	—	36			DJ Makidai from Exile Treasure Mix 2
"Hanasanaide yo" (はなさないでよ; "I Won't Let Go") (SoulJa featuring Thelma Aoyama)	2010	61	57	—	9	2,000		Letters
"Kimi ni Aitai..." (君に会いたい; "I Miss You") (Spicy Chocolate featuring Thelma Aoyama & Ryo the Skywalker)	2011	—	—	—	16			Shibuya Ragga Sweet Collection
"Love Trap" (Dohzi-T featuring Thelma Aoyama)	2011	—	—	—	24			12 Love Stories 2

=== Promotional singles ===
List of promotional singles with selected chart positions
Title	Year	Peak chart positions			Album
Title	Year	JPN Hot 100	JPN RIAJ monthly ringtones	JPN RIAJ Digital Track Chart	Album
"Diary"	2008	23	72	—	Diary
"Mama e" (ママへ; "To Mama")	2008	87	69	—	Diary
"Suki Desu." (好きです。; "I Like You.")	2009	—	26	—	Love!
"Happiness"	2009	67	—	9	Emotions
"Oh Baby Koishitetai" (OH BABY 恋してたい; "Oh Baby, I Wanna Be in Love")	2009	—	—	—	"Summer Love!!" (single)
"This Love" (featuring Ai)	2010	—	89	—	Love! 2
"Tokyo Lullaby" (東京ららばい, Tōkyō Rarabai)	2012	—	—	—	"Kimi ni Aeru Kara..." (single)
"Yume no Tsuzuki e" (夢の続きへ; "After the Dream")	2012	—	—	—	"Kimi ni Aeru Kara..." (single)
"Tokeyo"	2014	—	—	—	Lonely Angel
"Stay" (featuring Shota Shimizu)	2015	64	—	—	Gray Smoke
"One Day" (featuring Miliyah Kato and Ai)	2016	—	—	—	Pink Tears
"Unique"	2020	—	—	—	Inspire
"Stay with Me"	2021	86	—	—	Scorpion Moon

=== Other charted songs ===
List of songs not released as singles or promotional singles, with selected chart positions
Title	Year	Peak chart positions			Album
Title	Year	JPN RIAJ monthly ringtones	JPN RIAJ Digital Track Chart	KOR Overseas Single	Album
"Anata ni Aete Yokatta" (あなたに会えてよかった; "It Was Nice to Have Met You")	2008	31	—	—	Diary
"Mirai Yosōzu II" (未来予想図II; "Future Prediction Map II")	2008	51	—	—	"Nando mo" (single)
"Party Party (Thelma Remix)"	2009	89	—	—	Non-album song
"Futari no Yakusoku no Hi" (二人の約束の日; "Our Promise Day")	2009	—	8	—	Emotions
"Come Again"	2009	—	33	—	Tribute: Maison de M-Flo
"Believe"	2010	—	—	68	"Fall in Love" (single)

== Other appearances ==
List of non-studio album or guest appearances that feature Thelma Aoyama, that were not released as singles or promotional singles
Title	Year	Album
"T-Luvin'" (Note: Appears as an uncredited background chorus singer.) (DS455 + Big Ron)	2006	Bayblues Recordz presents Wintertime Wit' tha D.S.C: White Nite
"Let's Party (Don't Worry Bout It)" (DS455 + Big Ron)	2006	Bayblues Recordz presents Wintertime Wit' tha D.S.C: White Nite
"Diamond in the Rough" (Sphere of Influence)	2007	"Diamond in the Rough" (single)
"Don't Stop" (Dohzi-T)	2007	"Don't Stop" (single)
"Cassis" (SoulJa)	2007	Dogg Pound
"Turn It Up" (Dohzi-T featuring Verbal, Little, Kohei Japan, Thelma Aoyama)	2007	One Mic
"Love @ 1st Sight" (Mr. Beats a.k.a. DJ Celory featuring Coma-Chi, Thelma Aoyama)	2008	Beautiful Tomorrow
"Good Celebration" (Boogie Matsuda & Funky Freaks)	2008	Good Celebration
"Just Another Day" (DJ Pmx featuring Thelma Aoyama, Kayzabro)	2008	The Original
"Buranko" (ブランコ; "Swing") (Thelma Aoyama featuring Hi-D)	2008	Special Calling
"Da Bubble Gum Brothers Show" (Da Bubble Gum Brothers Show with Toshinobu Kubota, Thelma Aoyama)	2009	Da Bubble Gum Brothers Show: Tarikihongan
"Never Gonna Let You Go" (Demarco featuring Thelma Aoyama)	2010	Standing Soldier
"Secret Life" (Aisa Senda featuring Thelma Aoyama)	2010	Da First Episode
"Heaven's Lover" (Mickun featuring Thelma Aoyama)	2011	D.N.A
"Tell Me"	2013	Hide Tribute VI: Female Spirits
"I'll Be There with You" (Miliyah Kato featuring Ai & Thelma Aoyama)	2014	Muse
"All My Ladies" (Che'Nelle featuring Crystal Kay & Thelma Aoyama)	2015	@chenelleworld

== Video albums ==
List of media, with selected chart positions
Title	Album details	Peak positions
Title	Album details	JPN
Aoyama Thelma Tour 2009: Diary	Released: June 17, 2009 (JPN); Label: Universal; Formats: DVD	52
Motions: Thelma Clips Vol. 1	Released: September 9, 2009 (JPN); Label: Universal; Formats: DVD	173
