= Todoketai.../Kono Mama Zutto =

"Todoketai... / Kono Mama Zutto"

Single by Thelma Aoyama

from the album Love!: Thelma Love Song Collection and Emotions
- B-side: Some Day My Price Will Come (いつか王子様が)
- Released: March 11, 2009 (Japan)
- Recorded: 2008–2009
- Genre: Pop, R&B
- Length: 22:29
- Label: Universal J
- Songwriters: Ken the 390, Thelma Aoyama, Mika Arata, Larry Morey
- Producers: Ken the 390, DJ Komori, UTA, Hitoshi Harukawa, Frank Churchill

Thelma Aoyama singles chronology
"Daikkirai Demo Arigato" (2008)	"Todoketai... / Kono Mama Zutto" (2009)	"Wasurenai yo" (2009)

Music video
- "Todoketai..." on YouTube

"Todoketai..."/"Kono Mama Zutto" (届けたい･･･/このまま ずっと, I Wanna Send.../Just As It Is) is Thelma Aoyama's sixth single, and her first in 2009. It was released on March 11, 2009. The CD+DVD edition of the single includes a music video. "Todoketai..." is an answer song to "Todoketakute... feat. Aoyama Thelma" (届けたくて･･･ feat. 青山テルマ, You Wanted to Send... feat. Aoyama Thelma) by Ken the 390. This is Aoyama's first double A-side single.

== Track listing ==
No.	Title	Length
1.	"Todoketai... feat. Ken the 390 (届けたい･･･ feat. KEN THE 390, I Wanna Send... feat. Ken the 390)"	4:58
2.	"Kono Mama Zutto (このまま ずっと, Just As It Is)"	4:41
3.	"Some Day My Prince Will Come (Itsuka Ouji-sama ga) (いつか王子様が)"	3:12
4.	"Todoketai... feat. KEN THE 390 (Instrumental)"	4:57
5.	"Kono Mama Zutto (Instrumental)"	4:39

== Charting and release ==
The single debuted at #32 on the Oricon Weekly Chart and sold 3,015 physical copies that week.

Chart (2009)	Peak position
Oricon Daily Chart	22
Oricon Weekly Chart	32
Billboard Japan Hot 100	21
