= Daikkirai Demo Arigato =

"大っきらい でもありがと" / "Daikkirai Demo Arigato"

Single by Thelma Aoyama

from the album Love!: Thelma Love Song Collection
- B-side: "You're My Only Shinin' Star, Walk"
- Released: December 10, 2008
- Recorded: 2008
- Genre: J-Pop, R&B
- Label: Universal J
- Songwriter(s): Miwa Yoshida, Toshiki Kadomatsu, Aoyama Thelma
- Producer(s): Miwa Yoshida, Masato Nakamura, Toshiki Kadomatsu, 3rd Productions

Thelma Aoyama singles chronology
"Mamoritai Mono" (2008)	"大っきらい でもありがと" / "Daikkirai Demo Arigato" (2008)	"Todoketai.../Kono Mama Zutto" (2009)

Music video
- "Daikkirai Demo Arigato" on YouTube

"Daikkirai Demo Arigato" (大っきらい でもありがと, I Hate You, But Thanks) is Thelma Aoyama's fifth single, and her last in 2008. It was released on December 10, 2008. The song "Daikkirai Demo Arigato" is a collaboration with Dreams Come True, whom Aoyama has been a fan of since she was in kindergarten. The song is also featured on Dreams Come True's album "Do You Dreams Come True?" with vocals by the band. "Walk" was written by Aoyama herself.

== Track listing ==
No.	Title	Length
1.	"Daikkirai Demo Arigato (大っきらい でもありがと, I Hate You, But Thanks)"
2.	"You're My Only Shinin' Star"
3.	"Walk"

== Charts ==
The single debuted at No. 14 on the Oricon Weekly Chart and sold 9,815 physical copies that week. Total sales for "Daikkirai Demo Arigato" are 17,432.

=== Oricon charts ===
Chart (2008)	Peak position
Oricon Daily Chart	7
Oricon Weekly Chart	14

=== Billboard Japan charts ===
Chart (2008)	Peak position
Billboard Japan Hot 100	3
