= Wasurenai yo =

Single by Thelma Aoyama

from the album Emotions
- B-side: "Don't Stop"
- Released: August 5, 2009
- Recorded: 2009
- Genre: J-Pop, R&B
- Length: 17:07
- Label: Universal J
- Songwriter(s): Momo "Mocha" N
- Producer(s): Momo "Mocha" N, U-Key Zone

Thelma Aoyama singles chronology
"Todoketai.../Kono Mama Zutto" (2009)	"Wasurenai yo" (2009)	"Fall In Love feat. SOL from BIGBANG" (2010)

Music video
- "Wasurenai yo" on YouTube

"Wasurenai yo" (忘れないよ, I Won't Forget) is Thelma Aoyama's seventh single, and her second in 2009. It was released on August 5, 2009. The title is the theme song for Hachi: A Dog's Tale, which was released in Japan on August 8. The B-side, "Don't Stop", features vocals by AI. The CD+DVD edition of the single includes the music video for "Wasurenai yo".

== Track listing ==
No.	Title	Length
1.	"Wasurenai yo (忘れないよ, I Won't Forget)"
2.	"Don't Stop"
3.	"Wasurenai yo (Instrumental)"
4.	"Don't Stop (Instrumental)"
5.	"Wasurenai yo (Acoustic Version)"

== Live performances ==
1. 08/03 - Wasurenai yo - Hey! Hey! Hey!
2. 08/07 - Wasurenai yo - Music Station

== Charts ==
On its first day on the Oricon charts the single debuted at #20, it has since peaked at #14. The single eventually debuted at #20 on the Oricon weekly chart, selling 4,722 physical copies that week. In its second week the single dropped three places to #23 and sold a further 3,117 copies, and sold 1,642 in its third week, bringing the total sales to 9,481 copies sold.

=== Oricon ===
Chart (2009)	Peak position
Oricon Daily Chart	14
Oricon Weekly Chart	20

Total sales: 9,481*

=== Billboard Japan ===
Chart (2009)	Peak position
Billboard Japan Hot 100	13
