= Doraemon: Nobita's Great Battle of the Mermaid King =

2010 film by Kōzō Kusuba

Doraemon the Movie: Nobita's Great Battle of the Mermaid King
- Theatrical release poster

Japanese name
- Kanji: ドラえもん: のび太の人魚大海戦
Transcriptions
- Revised Hepburn: Doraemon: Nobita no Ningyo Daikaisen
- Directed by: Kōzō Kusuba
- Written by: Yuichi Shinbo
- Produced by: Kumi Ogura; Maiko Sumida; Shunsuke Okura; Takumi Fujimori; Tateshi Yamazaki
- Starring: Wasabi Mizuta; Megumi Ōhara; Yumi Kakazu; Subaru Kimura; Tomokazu Seki; Chiaki; Rie Tanaka; Mayumi Iizuka; Yoichi Nukumizu; Kun Sakana; Katsuhisa Houki
- Cinematography: Katsuyoshi Kishi
- Edited by: Hideaki Murai; Keiki Mimura; Riko Fujimoto; Toshihiko Kojima; Yumiko Nakaba
- Music by: Kan Sawada
- Production company: Shin-Ei Animation
- Distributed by: Toho
- Release date: March 6, 2010
- Running time: 99 minutes (1h 39m)
- Country: Japan
- Language: Japanese
- Box office: $43.1 million

Doraemon: Nobita's Great Battle of the Mermaid King (ドラえもん のび太の人魚大海戦, Doraemon: Nobita no Ningyo Daikaisen) is a 2010 Japanese animated science fantasy action adventure film based on the manga and anime series Doraemon, and is the 30th Doraemon film. The film was released in Japan on March 6, 2010.

== Plot ==
Suneo shows his diving photos in Palau to Gian and Shizuka. Nobita wants to go to Suneo's house to see more pictures, but he is unwelcomed and Doraemon comforts him. When Nobita wants to dive, Doraemon uses an "Underwater Pump Simulator" (架空水面シミュレーター・ポンプ) to pump the water out of Tokyo, causing the city to submerge. That night, Doraemon and Nobita use a "Diving Mask Simulator" to dive underwater. Nobita sees a fish tail, and tells Doraemon that he saw a mermaid. They take pictures, and hear a scream, who describes about the shadows of a mermaid and a shark. Nobita and Doraemon ask how he could see it without his goggles, and sees that the fish are still there, but the water is gone.

Nobita looks for the shark, which is actually behind him. Doraemon throws a frog into the shark's mouth, where the shark and other fish returns to the ocean, and the mermaid falls onto a tree branch. Nobita notices a fish tail beneath the leaves, and Doraemon finds a girl. After eating translation jelly, the girl introduces herself as Sophia. They take Sophia to a tour around the city and introduces them to Shizuka, Gian and Suneo. Due to various circumstances, the group learns that Sophia is a mermaid. Doraemon's sister Dorami visits the group, as advised by Doraemon, where she explains about the apparitions, legends and animals mistaken for mermaids. The group decides to lead Sophia to her home, and Doraemon copies Sophia's clothes, where he uses his familiar light to help them breathe underwater (and they become mermaids), using his watertight rope to keep water away. Sophia tells that Doraemon has powers like the goddess Manatia, and they learn about the existence of the powerful mermaid sword. Doraemon uses his mystery ink and scroll, which tells that five stars will form a pentagon.

The next day, the group heads towards Sophia's palace, but Nobita gets tired, where a giant eel appears behind them and they hide in a cave, until they are rescued by Sophia's soldiers, who misunderstands them to be Sophia's kidnappers, and sentences them to death after capturing the four. They arrive at the home of the mermaid tribe and are put in a fish tank, expecting to be eaten by a megalodon. Sophia tells the puffer fish to stop the execution, and they are released. Later, a soldier tells Sophia that she has been summoned by Queen Undine (queen of the mermaid tribe and Sophia's grandmother). When they arrive at the palace, Queen Undine tells Sophia that she will be queen.

Meanwhile, the group realizes that they left Shizuka behind. Gian and Suneo head back to find her. However, they later theorizes that she has been captured by their rival Merman tribe. Soon, the King of the Merman tribe arrives and demands the mermaid sword in exchange for Shizuka, who was mistaken to be the mermaid princess as she was wearing the royal tiara. Doraemon creates a fake sword with Nobita's toy inflated sword and gives it to the mermen in exchange for Shizuka. The Merman King realizes that the sword is not genuine, where his troops begin to attack the mermaid castle, and many mermaid soldiers were either injured or killed during the war. Sophia prays to the mermaid god, who reveals the location of the mermaid sword.

However, the Merman king steals the sword and uses it to wreak havoc by creating an underwater tornado. Doraemon lands in the watertight ring that they were using the day before, and uses a surfing board to spray the merman king with a special gas, allowing him to see the simulated water. Doraemon then lures the merman king onto an island, where it is revealed that the mermaid sword can not control the simulated water and therefore can not damage them. The merman king challenges Sophia to a duel, in which he breaks her sword. Doraemon uses the "Sword Round Lightning" to defeat the merman king in a duel.

Once Sophia receives the mermaid sword, she uses it to purify the ocean, telling Doraemon that is the true power of the mermaid sword. The Merman King is imprisoned in Doraemon's gadget, and his remaining merman forces are all sentenced to death for war crimes by the mermaid queen, who ordered all of them to be eaten alive by the same megalodon that nearly killed Doraemon and the gang. Afterwards, Doraemon, Nobita, Gian, Suneo and Shizuka return home from time machine.

== Cast ==
Character	Japanese voice actor
Doraemon	Wasabi Mizuta
Nobita Nobi	Megumi Ōhara
Shizuka Minamoto	Yumi Kakazu
Takeshi "Gian" Gōda	Subaru Kimura
Suneo Honekawa	Tomokazu Seki
Dorami	Chiaki
Tamako Nobi	Kotono Mitsuishi
Nobisuke Nobi	Yasunori Matsumoto
Sophia	Rie Tanaka
Haribō	Mayumi Iizuka
Dr. Mejina	Yoichi Nukumizu
Sakkana	Kun Sakana
Commander Rosy Grub/Tragis	Katsuhisa Houki
Hidetoshi Dekisugi	Shihoko Hagino
Mii-chan	Maru Tamari
Policeman	Hidenari Ugaki
Driver	Naomi Kusumi
Soldiers	Daisuke Kishio; Takashi Nagasako; Yasuhiro Takato
Ondine	Miki Maya

== Characters ==
- Sophia (ソフィア, Sofia): Mermaid princess of the kingdom
- Haribō (ハリ坊): An anthropomorphic puffer fish
- Dr. Mejina (メジーナ博士, Mejina Hakase): Professor of the kingdom
- Sakkana (サッカーナ) – Dr. Mejina's assistant
- Commander Rosy Grub/Tragis (トラギス司令官, Toragisu Shirei Kan): Villain

== Theme songs ==
- Opening: "Yume wo Kanaete Doraemon" by Mao
- Closing: "Kaeru Basho" by Thelma Aoyama

== DVD ==
Two editions of the film were released on DVD on December 1, 2010. The standard edition has the movie; the special edition has the movie, a wall hanger, a mini-tapestry, postcards and a bonus disc with a movie trailer, TV spots, a 30th-anniversary special and a documentary.

== Release ==
As part of the franchise's 40th anniversary (and the 30th anniversary of the first Doraemon film), the film was released in selected Singaporean cinemas on December 9, 2010, in Chinese.

== Reception ==
The film was nominated for the "Animation of the Year" award at the 34th Japan Academy Prize. It grossed ¥3.16 billion in Japan and was ranked the 5th highest grossing Japanese animated film of 2010.

== See also ==
- List of Doraemon films
