= Party Party: Thelma Remix =

Remix album by Thelma Aoyama
- Released: December 10, 2008
- Recorded: 2008
- Genre: J-Pop, Dance
- Length: 44:26
- Label: Universal Music Group

Thelma Aoyama chronology
Diary (2008)	Party Party: Thelma Remix (2008)	Love!: Thelma Love Song Collection (2009)

Party Party: Thelma Remix is a remix album by Japanese Pop/R&B singer Thelma Aoyama. It was released on December 10, 2008. The album debuted outside the Oricon album Chart Top 40, at #79, with initial sales of 2,705 copies.

== Track listing ==
1. Higher （Makai Remix） - 4:17
2. Mama e （ママへ; To Mom; Kentaro Takizawa Remix） - 5:59
3. Rhythm (リズム; Yasutaka Nakata（capsule） Remix) - 4:48
4. Paradise （SUGIURUMN Remix） - 7'56
5. Diary （A Hundred Birds Remix） - 7'13
6. Kono Mama De （このままで; Like This; Jazztronik Remix） - 4:54
7. Last Letter （FreeTEMPO Remix） - 5:56
8. One Way （M−Swift Broken Beat mix） - 5:23

== Charts ==
Oricon Sales Chart (Japan)

Release	Chart	Peak position	First week sales	Total sales
December 10, 2008	Oricon Weekly Albums Chart	79	2,705	3,798
