= Kaeru Basho =

Single by Thelma Aoyama
- B-side: "Anata ga Kiechai Sō de"
- Released: March 3, 2010
- Recorded: 2010
- Genre: R&B
- Length: 3:58
- Label: Universal J
- Songwriter: SoulJa

Thelma Aoyama singles chronology
"Fall in Love" (2010)	"Kaeru Basho" (2010)	"Summer Love!!" (2010)

"Kaeru Basho" (帰る場所, "A Place to Return To") is Thelma Aoyama's ninth single. It was released on March 3, 2010 by Universal J. "Kaeru Basho" was written by SoulJa who collaborated with her on their number-one song "Soba ni Iru ne". The song was used as the theme song for Doraemon: Nobita's Great Battle of the Mermaid King. The single peaked at number 63 and charted for three weeks.

== Track listing ==
No.	Title	Lyrics	Music	Arranger	Length
1.	"Kaeru Basho" (帰る場所 "A Place to Return To")	SoulJa	SoulJa	Jeff Miyahara, SoulJa	03:58
2.	"Anata ga Kiechai Sō de" (あなたが消えちゃいそうで)	Thelma Aoyama	T. Aoyama, Ayabe Kenzaburo	Manaboon (TinyVoice, Production)	4:23
3.	"Kaeru Basho (Instrumental)"	SoulJa	SoulJa	J. Miyahara, SoulJa	3:57
4.	"Anata ga Kiechai Sō de (Instrumental)"	T. Aoyama	T. Aoyama, Ayabe Kenzaburo	Manaboon (TinyVoice, Production)	4:23
