= Scorpion Moon =

Studio album by Thelma Aoyama
- Released: October 27, 2021
- Recorded: 2019–2020
- Genre: Hip hop; R&B
- Length: 43:31
- Language: Japanese; English
- Label: Universal J
- Producer: Thelma Aoyama; Aisho Nakajima; Sunny Boy; 3rd Productions; Uta; Toshi; R99; Ryosuke "Dr. R" Sakai

Thelma Aoyama chronology
High School Gal (2018)	Scorpion Moon (2021)

Singles from Scorpion Moon
- 1. "1LDK" Released: November 4, 2019; 2. "Ikiterudakede Gohōbi" Released: December 2, 2019; 3. "Yours Forever" Released: August 20, 2021; 4. "No No No" Released: October 27, 2021

Scorpion Moon is the seventh studio album by Japanese singer Thelma Aoyama, released October 27, 2021, by Universal J. The album was preceded by the release of three singles, "Ikiterudakede Gohōbi", "1LDK" and "Yours Forever" featuring Aisho Nakajima. Additionally, a promotional single, "Stay with Me" was released. A fourth single, "No No No" was issued on the day of the album's release.

Scorpion Moon debuted and peaked at number 218 on the Japan Oricon Albums Chart, which became Aoyama's lowest charting album, which previously was her fourth studio album Lovely Angel (2014).

== Background ==
This time, I focused on making music that I wanted to listen to...

— Aoyama reflecting on the production of the album

In August 2021, Aoyama announced her single "Yours Forever" with Aisho Nakajima. The song was her first single in a year and a half. Shortly after, Aoyama announced her new album and its title a week after the release of "Yours Forever". The album was scheduled for release on her birthday, October 27th. Music videos were released for "Stay with Me", "No No No" and "Yours Forever". The album was planned to be released in 2020 but was delayed due to the COVID-19 pandemic. The album title came from Aoyama's astrological sign, Scorpio.

== Composition and lyrics ==
Musically, Scorpion Moon is an R&B and hip hop album. Regarding Aoyama's musical shift from her ballad songs, she stated, "...I still sing ballads, but now I can include songs that I can enjoy as well." The album also features bilingual lyrics in both Japanese and English.

== Promotion ==
In promotion of the album, Aoyama appeared in a radio show on September 6, 2021. She also appeared in another radio show on October 27. Aoyama hosted a listening session, Thelma Aoyama Special Lounge Listening Party. The listening event was hosted on October 29.

== Track listing ==
Scorpion Moon
No.	Title	Writer(s)	Producer(s)	Length
1.	"Yours Forever" (featuring Aisho Nakajima)	Thelma Aoyama; Sunday Shipushu; Aisho Nakajima	Aoyama; Nakajima; Sunny Boy	3:13
2.	"1LDK"	Aoyama; 3rd Productions	3rd Productions	4:37
3.	"Stay with Me"	Aoyama; Uta	Uta	3:13
4.	"Tonight" (Interlude)	Aoyama; Toshi	Toshi	2:06
5.	"Too Late"	Aoyama; Shipushu	Sunny Boy	3:46
6.	"Daijyobu"	Aoyama; 3rd Productions	3rd Productions	4:51
7.	"Kimi no Tonari" (キミノトナリ)	Aoyama; Shipushu	Sunny Boy	3:06
8.	"Karma Katrina"	Aoyama; Shipushu	R99	3:16
9.	"F Me" (Interlude)	Aoyama; Toshi	Toshi	1:52
10.	"Boi Bye"	Aoyama; Toshi	Toshi	3:32
11.	"No No No"	Aoyama; Ryosuke "Dr. R" Sakai	Aoyama; Sakai	3:35
12.	"Life Goes On"	Aoyama; Toshi	Toshi	2:33
13.	"Ikiterudakede Gohōbi" (生きてるだけでご褒美)	Aoyama; 3rd Productions	3rd Productions
Total length:				43:31

Scorpion Moon – DVD Edition
No.	Title	Length
1.	"Ikiterudakede Gohōbi"
2.	"Yours Forever" (featuring Aisho Nakajima)
3.	"Stay with Me"
4.	"Onigiri at Family Fes 2021.08.26"
5.	"Isshō Nakama at Family Fes 2021.08.26" (一生仲間 at Family Fes 2021.08.26)

=== Notes ===
- Tracks 3–6 and 12 are stylized in lower case lettering.
- Tracks 8 and 9 are stylized in all upper case lettering.
- Tracks 7 and 13 are titled in Japanese.
- Track 10 is stylized as "BOi ByE".

== Charts ==
Chart (2021)	Peak position
Japanese Albums (Oricon)	218

== Release history ==
Region	Date	Format(s)	Version	Label	Ref.
Various	October 27, 2021	Digital download; streaming	Standard	Universal J; Universal	
Japan	October 27, 2021	CD	Standard	Universal Japan; Universal J	
Japan	October 27, 2021	CD; DVD	First Press Limited	Universal Japan; Universal J	
