= SoulJa =

Japanese hip-hop musician and songwriter (born 1983)

Soulja
- Born: Johannes Maria Leenders Zwaan; 1 November 1983 (age 42)
- Origin: Higashikurume, Tokyo, Japan
- Genres: Hip-hop; R&B
- Occupations: Singer-songwriter, rapper
- Years active: 2005–present
- Labels: Rock & Hill Records (2005–2006); Nayutawave Records (2007–2008); Def Jam Japan (2008–present)
- Website: soulja.jp

Johannes Maria Leenders Zwaan, better known as Soulja (ソルジャ, Soruja; stylized as SoulJa), is a Japanese hip-hop musician and songwriter best known for his collaborations with singer Thelma Aoyama, "Koko ni Iru yo" and "Soba ni Iru ne" – the latter of which was the former Guinness World Records holder for the best selling digital single of all-time in Japan (until it was superseded by Greeeen's "Kiseki").

He has worked with various Japanese singers, including Thelma Aoyama, Issa, Rola, and Misslim.

== Biography ==
SoulJa's mother is Belgian and his father is Japanese. He studied music, learning how to play the violin, cello and piano from a young age, due to the influence of his mother. During his childhood, he spent time in Belgium, Japan and the United States. At 15, he grew to love hip-hop music.

In 2003, he returned to Japan, and began creating music. He got his first big break when a song of his, "First Contact," was featured in a commercial for Men's Beauteen (featuring actor Joe Odagiri) in 2005. This led to several more offers to write commercial music for companies such as magazine Oggi, along with SoulJa's independent label debut. In late 2005, he released the EP First Contact under Rock & Hill Records.

In 2007, SoulJa debuted as a major label artist with Universal Music Japan. His third single, "Koko ni Iru yo" featuring R&B singer Thelma Aoyama, became a long selling hit, staying in Oricon's top 10 singles for five weeks. Eventually, by March 2008, the song had been certified by the RIAJ for selling over 1,000,000+ ringtones, 1,000,000+ cellphone full-length downloads and 100,000 PC downloads.

SoulJa's debut album, Spirits, released two and a half months later, was a modest success, breaking the top 10 on Oricon and selling over 66,000 copies.

In January 2008, Thelma Aoyama released her own answer version to the song, "Soba ni Iru ne." This version outstripped the popularity of the original, topping the RIAJ's monthly ringtone chart for three months, peaking at No. 1 on Oricon's single sales charts and eventually being certified by Guinness World Records as the best digital single in Japan of all-time (an award it held for a year).

After the extreme popularity of this version, SoulJa re-released Spirits, featuring a self-cover of this version (featuring vocalist Yukie).

SoulJa's second album, Colorz, was preceded by two singles: "Kinenbi/Home" (記念日・ｈｏｍｅ, Anniversary/Home) feat. Misslim (a pseudonym for Yumi Matsutoya) and "One Time" feat. Issei & Jin Oki. The album did not do as well as his previous, only reaching No. 106 on Oricon's album charts. "Kinenbi" was a minor hit, charting in the top 20 on RIAJ's Chaku-uta chart for two months.

In January 2010, SoulJa released his 6th single, "Way to Love (Saigo no Koi)" feat. Miho Karasawa. It was a digital hit, being certified by the RIAJ for selling 100,000 copies after charting for two months. This will be followed by his third album, Letters, along with the leading single "Hanasanaide yo" featuring Thelma Aoyama. SoulJa also worked together with Aoyama on her single "Kaeru Basho," writing the song.

== Discography ==
=== Albums ===
| Year | Album Information | Oricon Albums Charts | Reported sales |
|---|---|---|---|
| 2007 | Spirits: Released: 7 November 2007; Label: Universal Music Japan (UPCH-20050); Re-released on 18 June 2008 as Spirits X'tended; Formats: CD, digital download | 9 | 66,000 |
| 2009 | Colorz: Released: 25 February 2009; Label: Universal Music Japan (UMCK-1295); Formats: CD, digital download | 106 | 2,000 |
| 2010 | Letters: Released: 16 June 2010; Label: Universal Music Japan (UMCK-9348); Formats: CD, digital download | 36 | 2,300 |

=== EPs ===
| Year | Album Information |
|---|---|
| 2005 | First Contact: Released: 1 November 2005; Independent album; Re-released on 11 January 2006; Formats: CD, digital download |

=== Singles ===
==== As lead artist ====
| Release | Title | Notes | Chart positions | | | Oricon sales | Album |
| Release | Title | Notes | Oricon Singles Charts | Billboard Japan Hot 100† | RIAJ digital tracks† | Oricon sales | Album |
|---|---|---|---|---|---|---|---|
| 2007 | "Dogg Pound" | | 100 | — | — | 4,000 | Spirits |
| 2007 | "Rain" | | 99 | — | — | 1,500 | Spirits |
| 2007 | "Koko ni Iru yo" (ここにいるよ; I'm Here) feat. Thelma Aoyama | | 6 | 77 | 3* | 149,000 | Spirits |
| 2008 | "Soba ni Iru ne" feat. Yukie | Self-cover, radio single. | — | — | 29* | — | Spirits X'tended |
| 2008 | "Kinenbi/Home" (記念日・ｈｏｍｅ; Anniversary/Home) feat. Misslim | | 24 | 33 | 13* | 9,000 | Colorz |
| 2009 | "One Time" feat. Issei & Jin Oki | | 86 | 82 | — | 1,300 | Colorz |
| 2010 | "Way to Love (Saigo no Koi)" (Ｗａｙ ｔｏ Ｌｏｖｅ ～最後の恋～; Final Love) feat. Miho Karasawa | | 62 | — | 11 | 3,000 | Letters |
| 2010 | "Umaku Kotoba ni Dekinai Keredo" (うまく言葉にできないけれど; I Can't Express It Well, But) feat. Saki Kayama | | 88 | — | 13 | 500 | Letters |
| 2010 | "Hanasanai de yo" (はなさないでよ; Don't Break Us Apart) feat. Thelma Aoyama | | 61 | 57 | 9 | 1,600 | Letters |
| 2010 | "Gekkō (God's Child)" (月光～GOD'S CHILD～; Moonlight) feat. Chihiro Onitsuka | Radio single. | — | — | 23 | — | Letters |
| 2010 | "Breath" | | 36 | TBA | TBA | 3000 | TBA |

* charted on monthly Chaku-uta Reco-kyō Chart.
†Japan Hot 100 established February 2008, RIAJ Digital Track Chart established April 2009.

==== As a featured artist ====
| Release | Artist | Title | Notes | Chart positions | | | Oricon sales | Album |
| Release | Artist | Title | Notes | Oricon Singles Charts | Billboard Japan Hot 100 | RIAJ digital tracks | Oricon sales | Album |
|---|---|---|---|---|---|---|---|---|
| 2008 | Thelma Aoyama feat. SoulJa | "Soba ni Iru ne" | "Koko ni Iru yo" answer song. | 1 | 1 | 1* | 465,000 | Diary |
| 2010 | Skelt 8 Bambino feat. SoulJa | "What's Love?" | Featured on Letters as a bonus track. | 190 | — | 33 | 300 | Love Balance |
| 2010 | Thelma Aoyama | "Kaeru Basho" | Written by SoulJa. | 63 | 26 | 51 | 2,000 | TBA |

=== Other appearances ===
| Release | Artist | Title | Notes | Album |
|---|---|---|---|---|
| 2008 | SoulJa | "Break" | | Negachaincompi: Negative Happy Chainsaw Edge Official Compi |
| 2008 | SoulJa | "Engage" | | Negachaincompi: Negative Happy Chainsaw Edge Official Compi |
| 2008 | Sly and Robbie feat. Lady Traffic, SoulJa & Chantelle | "Hurry Home (Soba ni Iru ne)" (ハリー・ホーム(そばにいるね); Hurry Home (I'm By Your Side)) | "Soba ni Iru ne" English cover. Featured on Colorz. | Amazing |
| 2010 | Yuki Koyanagi feat. SoulJa | "Be Alive (Sono Mama no Kimi de Ite) (New Recording)" (be alive～そのままの君でいて～; Be As You Are) | Featured on Letters as a bonus track. RIAJ No. 32. | The Best Now & Then: 10th Anniversary |
| 2010 | Under Graph × SoulJa | "2111 (Kako to Mirai de Warau Kodomotachi e)" (2111～過去と未来で笑う子供達へ～; To Children Laughing in the Past and Future) | Originally released as a digital single on 2 June 2010. | "Natsukage" (single) |
| 2010 | Issa × SoulJa | "Breathe" c/w/ "Destiny" | | (single) |

He also graduated Christian Academy in Japan.
