= Emotions (Thelma Aoyama album) =

Studio album by Thelma Aoyama
- Released: September 9, 2009
- Recorded: 2009
- Genre: J-Pop, R&B, Acoustic
- Label: Universal Music Japan

Thelma Aoyama chronology
Love!: Thelma Love Song Collection (2009)	Emotions (2009)	Love! 2: Thelma Best Collaborations (2010)

Singles from Emotions
- 1. "Todoketai.../Kono Mama Zutto" Released: March 11, 2009; 2. "Wasurenai yo" Released: August 5, 2009

Emotions is Thelma Aoyama's second studio album, and her third album overall. The album was released on September 9, 2009. Two singles have been released from this album, "Todoketai.../Kono Mama Zutto" (届けたい…/このままずっと, I Want to Send.../This Much Remains) and "Wasurenai yo" (忘れないよ, I Won't Forget). "Kono Mama Zutto" was not included in this album. Aoyama also released "Motions - Thelma Clips Vol. 1", a collection of her music videos.

== Track listing ==
No.	Title	Length
1.	"Intro"
2.	"Wasurenai yo (忘れないよ, I Won't Forget)"
3.	"Happiness"
4.	"Futari no Yakusoku no Hi (二人の約束の日, Our Promised Day)"
5.	"I'm Sorry"
6.	"Keep On"
7.	"Sunao ni Narenakute (素直になれなくて, I Can't Put Up with This)"
8.	"Todoketai... feat. Ken the 390 (届けたい…, I Want to Reach You...)"
9.	"Baby, I Love You"
10.	"Look (Written by Thelma Aoyama, Larry Nacht, Danny Schofield, Shelene Thomas, Winston Thomas.)"
11.	"Wanna Come Again feat. Verbal (M-Flo)"
12.	"Cinderella Story"

== Chart ==
"Emotions" debuted at No. 9 on the Oricon Daily Chart on its first day.

=== Oricon Chart ===
Chart (2009)	Peak position
Oricon Daily Chart	8
Oricon Weekly Chart	11

Total Sales: 18,031*
