= Aisa Senda =

Japanese singer-actor

Aisa Senda 千田 愛紗
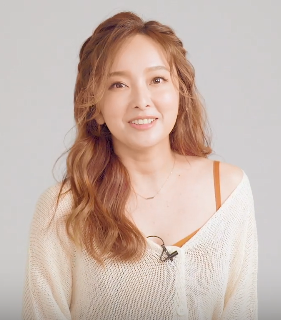

Background information
- Born: November 8, 1982 (age 43); Ginowan, Okinawa, Japan
- Genres: Mandopop
- Occupations: Singer, actress, presenter
- Years active: 2000–present
- Labels: Forward Music, Universal Music Taiwan, JSJ Music
- Website: Official blog

Aisa Senda (千田 愛紗, Senda Aisa; born November 8, 1982) is a Japanese singer, actress, and television presenter. She made her debut in 2000 in Taiwan as part of the girls group Sunday Girls, and has concentrated her activities in Taiwan since then. She is capable of speaking both Japanese and Mandarin, and had appeared in a number of commercials, programs, and television dramas. She is also the vocalist of the Mandarin pop band Da Mouth, which was formed in November 2007.

== Career ==
Senda was born and raised in Ginowan, Okinawa, Japan, where she had been attending Okinawa Actors School since the age of nine. In 2000, after the unexpected departure of Ando Yuko from Super Sunday, a popular television program in Taiwan, Senda was brought in to fill the opened spot. She and three other girls later formed Sunday Girls, and released their only album Xi-huan-ni (Chinese:喜歡你) which contains both Japanese and Mandarin songs. The group disbanded in 2001.

Since leaving Super Sunday, she had appeared on a number of variety shows, as well as several commercials. She made her debut on television dramas when she was cast in Meteor Rain, the sequel of the famous drama Meteor Garden among F4..

She joined Da Mouth in 2007 as their female vocalist, and released their first album Da Mouth in November 2007.

On 18 November 2018, she released her solo single, "梭哈 -So Hot-" with Kai under label JSJ Music.

== Discography ==
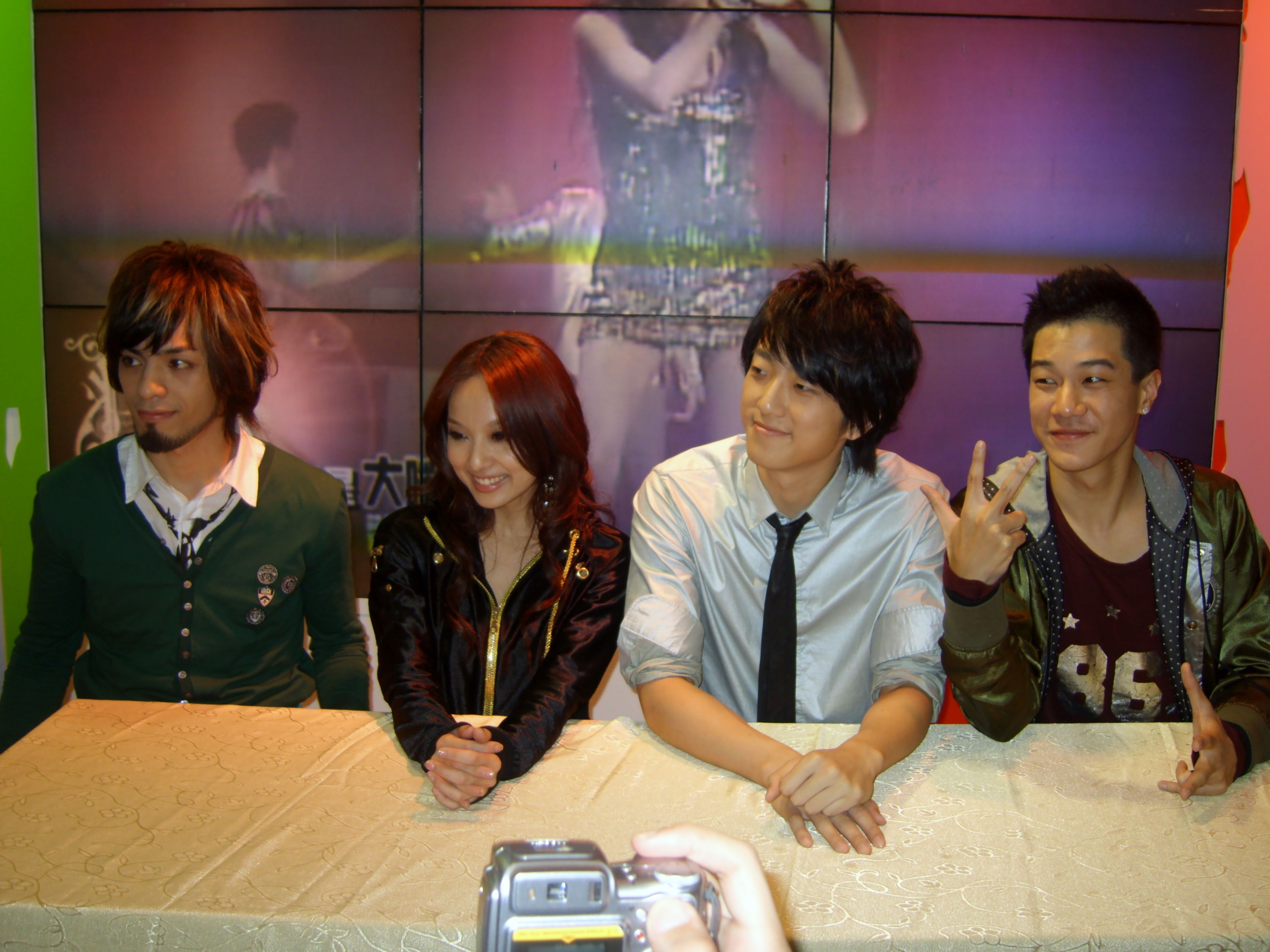
Aisa (second from the left), along with members of Da Mouth.

=== Singles ===
Year	English Title	Chinese Title	Tracks	Note
2003	"Winner go go go!"	–	1	computer game
2018	So Hot	梭哈	1	

Album Information	Track listing
喜歡你 by Sunday Girls: Released: 2001; Format: CD; Label: Forward Music	Track listing: 1. 喜歡你; 2. 努力向上吧; 3. Fresh; 4. Flower; 5. First Love; 6. 快樂在一起; 7. 丸子三兄弟; 8. 好想嫁給他; 9. 好久不見; 10. Love Machine
大嘴巴 (Da Mouth): Released: November 16, 2007; Format: CD; Label: Universal Music	Track listing: 1. The Starting 4; 2. 靠過來; 3. Get You Back; 4. 結果咧 (Intro version); 5. 結果咧; 6. Step On The Beat; 7. 我願意; 8. 我就是喜歡你; 9. Mr. Cool Boy; 10. 大嘴巴; 11. 119; 12. 無可取代; 13. 懷秋
王元口力口 (Player): Released: December 19, 2008; Format: CD; Label: Universal Music	Track listing: 1. Intro; 2. Da Now一場; 3. 國王皇后 (Puma Ad Song); 4. 緊箍咒; 5. 愛的宣言 (Kobayashi Glasses Ad Song); 6. 永遠在身邊; 7. Falling Like Dat; 8. Asalato Box; 9. We Wanna Party; 10. 小心眼; 11. Down; 12. You Are My Angel
万凸3 (One Two Three): Released: January 23, 2010; Format: CD; Label: Universal Music	Track listing: 1. 3010; 2. Rock It; 3. 喇舌; 4. Green Kicks; 5. 愛不愛我; 6. 搜尋遊戲; 7. 牽心的朋友; 8. Back To The Future; 9. 未來派對; 10. Turn Up The Music; 11. Happy Birthday My Dear; 12. ShInInG
流感 (Influence): Released: April 27, 2012; Format: CD; Label: Universal Music	Track listing: 1. 張大你的嘴巴; 2. 流感; 3. 你怕誰; 4. R u kiDdiNg mE; 5. Beautiful Luv; 6. Maybe 的機率; 7. 防衛心態; 8. Up 3x 9. BaBOO; 10. 最親的擁抱; 11. Baby Gnite
有事嗎？ (Back To The Future): Released: May 8, 2015; Format: CD; Label: Universal Music	Track listing: 1. DM111.6; 2. Funky那個女孩 (feat. Pauline Lan) ("Let Dat Gal Go"); 3. 有事嗎？（What The...）; 4. 魯蛇（Loser）; 5. BB Call; 6. 玩玩（Keep on Playing）; 7. 木目心（Thinking of You）; 8. 調調（Swag）; 9. Super不明（Super Boomin）; 10. 要壞掉了（I Wanna be Your Lover）; 11. 大告白（Confession）

=== Special Album ===
Album Information	Track listing
Japanese Album: DA Mouth -結局、どうなの～？: Released: March 6, 2009; Format: CD; Label: Universal Music	Track listing: 1. 結果咧(Japanese Ver.); 2. 119; 3. 永遠在身邊; 4. 我就是喜歡你; 5. 國王皇后; 6. 緊箍咒; 7. 愛的宣言; 8. 懷秋; 9. We Wanna Party; 10. Mr. Cool Boy; 11. 靠過來; 12. Get You Back; 13. 結果咧(Intro Ver.); 14. 結果咧
Greatest Hits Album: 首部曲 (Da First Episode): Released: October 8, 2010; Format: CD; Label: Universal Music	Track listing Disc1: 1. 永遠在身邊; 2. 結果咧 Intro; 3. 結果咧; 4. 國王皇后; 5. 喇舌; 6. 119; 7. 愛的宣言; 8. 我就是喜歡你; 9. Happy Birthday 買滴兒; 10. Rock It; 11. 首部曲Remix; Disc2: 1. 沒禮貌; 2. It's On; 3. 大創作家（by MC40）; 4. Dance To Da Beat Mr.DJ; 5. Secret Life（by Aisa／Aoyama Teruma）; 6. 臨時演員（by Harry）; 7. 結果咧（Japanese Remix）

== Filmography ==
=== Television series ===
Year	English Title	Chinese Title	Role
2001	Meteor Rain	流星雨	Herself (Aisha) 愛紗
2001	Poor Prince	貧窮貴公子	–
2002	Spicy Hot Teacher	麻辣鮮師	–
2002	–	慾望六人行	–
2003	The Rose	薔薇之戀	Mary 瑪麗
2006	–	我的兒子是老大	–
2007	They Kiss Again	惡作劇2吻	Mary 瑪麗
