= Love! (Thelma Love Song Collection) =

Love!: Thelma Love Song Collection

Greatest hits album by Thelma Aoyama
- Released: February 11, 2009
- Recorded: 2007–2009
- Genre: J-Pop, R&B
- Length: 44:22
- Label: Universal Music Japan

Thelma Aoyama chronology
Party Party: Thelma Remix (2008)	Love!: Thelma Love Song Collection (2009)	Emotions (2009)

Singles from Love!: Thelma Love Song Collection
- 1. "Soba ni Iru ne" Released: January 23, 2008; 2. "Nando mo" Released: July 9, 2008; 3. "Mamoritai Mono" Released: November 12, 2008; 4. "Daikkirai Demo Arigato" Released: December 10, 2008

Love!: Thelma Love Song Collection is a compilation of love songs by Thelma Aoyama. It was released on February 11, 2009 in Japan and became her first #1 album on the Japanese Oricon Weekly Chart. The last track "Again" is a cover of the Janet Jackson song of the same name. The album was preceded by the four singles "Soba ni Iru ne" (そばにいるね, I'm by Your Side), "Nando mo" (何度も, How Many Times), "Mamoritai Mono" (守りたいもの, Guy I Wanna Protect) and "Daikkirai Demo Arigatou" (大っきらい でもありがと, I Hate You, But Thanks). The DVD section includes music videos for these singles. The album is certified Gold for shipment of 100,000 copies.

== Track listing ==
No.	Title	Length
1.	"Soba ni Iru ne (そばにいるね, I'm by Your Side)"
2.	"Daikkirai Demo Arigato (大っきらい でもありがと, I Hate You, But Thanks)"
3.	"Nando mo (何度も, How Many Times)"
4.	"Mamoritai Mono (守りたいもの, Guy I Wanna Protect)"
5.	"Suki Desu. (好きです。, I Like You.)"
6.	"Kono Mama Zutto (このまま ずっと, Just As It Is)"
7.	"Last Letter"
8.	"Love (DJ Kawasaki Remix)"
9.	"Again (Janet Jackson cover)"

== Charts ==
Oricon Sales Chart (Japan)

Release	Chart	Peak position	First week sales	Total sales
February 11, 2009	Oricon Daily Albums Chart	1		
February 11, 2009	Oricon Weekly Albums Chart	1	45,233	107,545
February 11, 2009	Oricon Monthly Albums Chart	8		
