= Diary (Thelma Aoyama album) =

2008 album by Thelma Aoyama

Studio album by Thelma Aoyama
- Released: March 26, 2008
- Genre: J-Pop
- Label: Universal J
- Producers: Third Productions; SoulJa; 813; Hitoshi Harukawa

Thelma Aoyama chronology
Diary (2008)	Party Party: Thelma Remix (2008)

Singles from Diary
- 1. "One Way" Released: September 5, 2007; 2. "Soba ni Iru ne" Released: January 23, 2008

Diary is the debut studio album by Japanese singer Thelma Aoyama, released on March 26, 2008, by Universal J.

Professional ratings
Review scores
Source	Rating
AllMusic	3.5/5 stars

== Track listing ==
Diary track listing
No.	Title	Writer(s)	Length
1.	"My Beginning"		0:32
2.	"Soba ni Iru ne" (そばにいるね) (featuring SoulJa)	SoulJa	4:59
3.	"One Way"	Thelma Aoyama; Third Productions	4:08
4.	"My Dear Friends"	Kenn Kato; Hitoshi Harukawa	3:45
5.	"Last Letter"		4:37
6.	"Rhythm" (リズム)		4:07
7.	"Good Time" (remix) (featuring Miku from Ya-Kyim)	Aoyama; Third Productions	4:28
8.	"Higher"		3:39
9.	"Paradise"		4:12
10.	"This Day" (featuring Dohzi-T)	Aoyama; Dohzi-T; 813	5:16
11.	"Kono Mama de" (このままで)		4:35
12.	"Anata ni Aete Yokatta" (あなたに会えてよかった)		5:06
13.	"Mama e" (ママへ)		4:47
14.	"Diary"		5:03

== Charts ==
Oricon Sales Chart (Japan)

Release	Chart	Peak position	First week sales	Total sales
January 23, 2008	Oricon Daily Albums Chart	2		
January 23, 2008	Oricon Weekly Albums Chart	3	116,453	372,375
January 23, 2008	Oricon Monthly Albums Chart	4		
January 23, 2008	Oricon Yearly Albums Chart	26		
