= Soba ni Iru ne =

2008 single by Thelma Aoyama

Single by Thelma Aoyama featuring SoulJa

from the album Diary
- B-side: "My Dear Friends"; "This Day"
- Released: January 23, 2008
- Recorded: November 2007
- Studio: Sara Music Studio (Nagoya, Japan)
- Genre: R&B
- Label: Universal J
- Songwriter: SoulJa
- Producer: Hiroshi Sato

Thelma Aoyama singles chronology
"One Way" (2007)	"Soba ni Iru ne" (2008)	"Nando mo" (2008)

Music video
- "Soba ni Iru ne" on YouTube

Soba ni Iru ne (そばにいるね, I'm by Your Side) is a song recorded by Japanese singer Thelma Aoyama featuring Japanese rapper SoulJa, released on January 23, 2008, via Universal J. It is an answer song to her previous collaboration with SoulJa, "Koko ni Iru yo." The B-side of the single, "My Dear Friends", was used as the ending theme to anime Shion no Ō, and the opening theme to television show Ryuuha-R.

The single reached the number 1 position on Japan's Oricon charts in its second week and sold over 450,000 compact discs. In addition, it sold over 7 million downloads, including 2 million complete downloads, by July 2008. In September 2008, the Guinness World Records certified the song as "the best selling download single in Japan" for the number of full-track downloads. On May 28, 2009, however, it was announced that the record was replaced by Greeeen's song "Kiseki". It was later admitted by the Guinness World Records.

It was also the best-selling download single on the iTunes Store 2008 yearly charts in Japan.

Taiwanese band Da Mouth sang their cover version of "Koko ni Iru yo" on their album Wang Yuan Kou Li Kou.

"Soba ni Iru ne" was also covered by Sly and Robbie on their album Amazing.

== Track listing ==
"Sobi ni Iru ne" track listing
No.	Title	Writer(s)	Producer(s)	Length
1.	"Soba ni Iru ne" (featuring SoulJa)	SoulJa	Hiroshi Sato	5:03
2.	"My Dear Friends"	Hitoshi Harukawa; Kenn Kato	Harukawa	3:49
3.	"This Day" (featuring Dohzi-T)	Thelma Aoyama; 813; Dohzi-T	813	5:19
Total length:				14:11

== Credits and personnel ==
- Thelma Aoyama – vocals
- SoulJa – vocals, rap
- Hiroshi Sato – keyboard, rhythm programming, synth bass, mixing, mastering
- Hirokazu Ogura – guitar
- Mayna – chorus vocals

== Charts ==
Chart performance for "Soba ni Iru ne"
Chart (2008)	Peak position
Japan (Japan Hot 100)	1
Japan (Oricon)	1

== Certifications ==
Certifications for "Soba ni Iru ne"
Region	Certification	Certified units/sales
Streaming
Japan (RIAJ)	Platinum	100,000,000^{†}
^{†} Streaming-only figures based on certification alone.
