= Da Mouth =

Taiwanese hip hop and mandopop band

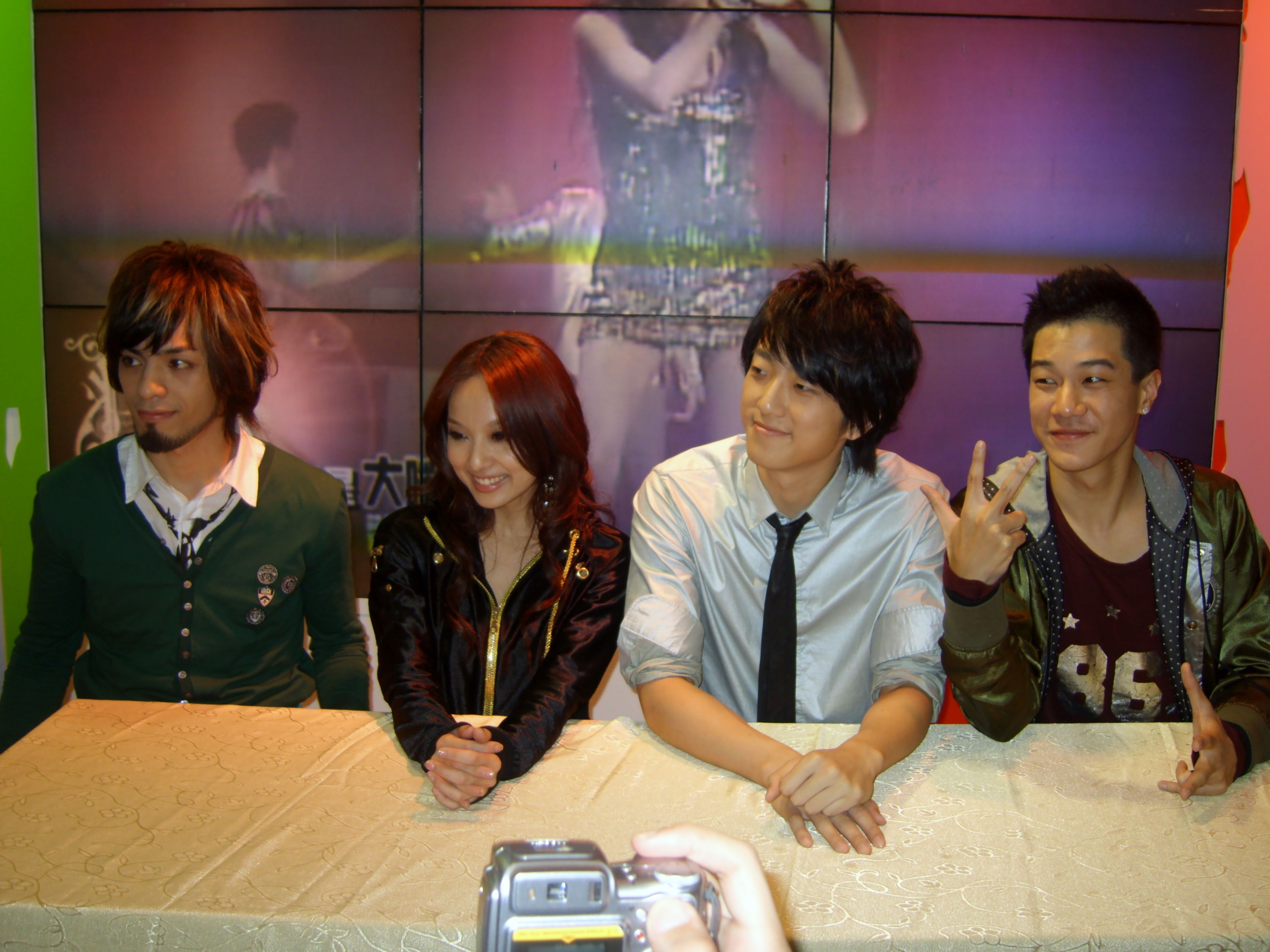
- Da Mouth at 2007 Taipei IT Month
- Born: Taipei, Taiwan
- Years active: 2007–2016
- Awards: Golden Melody Awards – Best Singing Group; 2008 Da Mouth; Best Singing Group; 2011 One Two Three
- Musical career
- Also known as: DM
- Origin: Taipei, Taiwan
- Genres: Mandopop, hip hop, urban
- Labels: Universal Music Taiwan
- Members: Aisa; DJ Chung Hua; MC40; Harry
- Website: www.umusic.com.tw

Da Mouth (Chinese: 大嘴巴; pinyin: dà zuǐbā; lit. 'Big Mouth') was a Taiwanese hip hop band made up of MC40, DJ Chung Hua, male vocalist Harry and female vocalist Aisa. They were formed in 2007 and disbanded in 2016. They are considered the Asian The Black Eyed Peas due to the group's diversity. The band's Chinese band name directly translates into "big mouth". Their English band name is derived from the concatenation of the Chinese character for "big" 大, which when romanized using pinyin becomes "dà" and the translation of the second half of their Chinese band name. They released their self-titled debut album Da Mouth on 16 November 2007.

The group won Best Singing Group at the 19th Golden Melody Awards in 2008 and at the 22nd Golden Melody Awards in 2011.

== Members ==
- DJ Chung Hua (坂本宗華) - Taiwanese / Japanese - DJ
- Harry (張懷秋) - Taiwanese (mixed Korean) - male lead vocalist
- MC40 (薛仕凌) - Taiwanese - MC/rapper
- Aisa Senda (千田愛紗) - Japanese - female lead vocalist

== Career ==
The group is formed by: Canadian Taiwanese MC40 (薛仕凌), Korean-Taiwanese-American male vocalist Harry (張懷秋), Japanese Taiwanese DJ Chung Hua (坂本宗華) and Japanese female vocalist Aisa (千田愛紗).

Harry grew up in San Mateo County, California, located around San Francisco. MC40 was raised in Vancouver, Canada. He writes most of Da Mouth's lyrics on the album and is considered one of the best and fastest rappers in Taiwan with his multi-language rapping ability. Aisa was born in Japan and was originally a member of Sunday Girls from the popular Taiwanese television program Super Sunday before she joined the group. DJ Chung Hua moved to Japan with his parents at the age of 14. He is known as the producer of the group and he had won many DJ awards internationally.

Their debut album titled Da Mouth was released on 16 November 2007. In 2010 they released their third album One Two Three (万凸3). The lead track "喇舌" is listed at number 42 on Hit Fm Taiwan's Hit Fm Annual Top 100 Singles Chart (Hit-Fm年度百首單曲) for 2010.

== Discography ==
=== Album ===
Album Information	Track listing
大嘴巴 (Da Mouth): Released: November 16, 2007; Format: CD; Label: Universal Music	Track listing: 1. The Starting 4; 2. 靠過來; 3. Get You Back; 4. 結果咧 (Intro version); 5. 結果咧; 6. Step On The Beat; 7. 我願意; 8. 我就是喜歡你; 9. Mr. Cool Boy; 10. 大嘴巴; 11. 119; 12. 無可取代; 13. 懷秋
王元口力口 (Player): Released: December 19, 2008; Format: CD; Label: Universal Music	Track listing: 1. Intro; 2. Da Now一場; 3. 國王皇后 (Puma Ad Song); 4. 緊箍咒; 5. 愛的宣言 (Kobayashi Glasses Ad Song); 6. 永遠在身邊; 7. Falling Like Dat; 8. Asalato Box; 9. We Wanna Party; 10. 小心眼; 11. Down; 12. You Are My Angel
万凸3 (One Two Three): Released: January 23, 2010; Format: CD; Label: Universal Music	Track listing: 1. 3010; 2. Rock It; 3. 喇舌; 4. Green Kicks; 5. 愛不愛我; 6. 搜尋遊戲; 7. 牽心的朋友; 8. Back To The Future; 9. 未來派對; 10. Turn Up The Music; 11. Happy Birthday My Dear; 12. ShInInG
流感 (Influence): Released: April 27, 2012; Format: CD; Label: Universal Music	Track listing: 1. 張大你的嘴巴; 2. 流感; 3. 你怕誰; 4. R u kiDdiNg mE; 5. Beautiful Luv; 6. Maybe 的機率; 7. 防衛心態; 8. Up 3x 9. BaBOO; 10. 最親的擁抱; 11. Baby Gnite
有事嗎？ (Back To The Future): Released: May 8, 2015; Format: CD; Label: Universal Music	Track listing: 1. DM111.6; 2. Funky那個女孩 (feat. Pauline Lan) ("Let Dat Gal Go"); 3. 有事嗎？（What The...）; 4. 魯蛇（Loser）; 5. BB Call; 6. 玩玩（Keep on Playing）; 7. 木目心（Thinking of You）; 8. 調調（Swag）; 9. Super不明（Super Boomin）; 10. 要壞掉了（I Wanna be Your Lover）; 11. 大告白（Confession）

=== Special Album ===
Album Information	Track listing
Japanese Album: DA Mouth -結局、どうなの～？: Released: March 6, 2009; Format: CD; Label: Universal Music	Track listing: 1. 結果咧(Japanese Ver.); 2. 119; 3. 永遠在身邊; 4. 我就是喜歡你; 5. 國王皇后; 6. 緊箍咒; 7. 愛的宣言; 8. 懷秋; 9. We Wanna Party; 10. Mr. Cool Boy; 11. 靠過來; 12. Get You Back; 13. 結果咧(Intro Ver.); 14. 結果咧
Greatest Hits Album: 首部曲 (Da First Episode): Released: October 8, 2010; Format: CD; Label: Universal Music	Track listing Disc1: 1. 永遠在身邊; 2. 結果咧 Intro; 3. 結果咧; 4. 國王皇后; 5. 喇舌; 6. 119; 7. 愛的宣言; 8. 我就是喜歡你; 9. Happy Birthday 買滴兒; 10. Rock It; 11. 首部曲Remix; Disc2: 1. 沒禮貌; 2. It's On; 3. 大創作家（by MC40）; 4. Dance To Da Beat Mr.DJ; 5. Secret Life（by Aisa／Aoyama Teruma）; 6. 臨時演員（by Harry）; 7. 結果咧（Japanese Remix）

== Awards and nominations ==
	Year	Award	Album	Result	Ref
2008	19th Golden Melody Awards	Best Singing Group	Da Mouth	Won	
2009	20th Golden Melody Awards	Best Singing Group	Player	Nominated	
2011	22nd Golden Melody Awards	Best Singing Group	One Two Three	Won	
