= Thelma Aoyama =

Japanese pop and R&B singer (born 1987)

Thelma Aoyama 青山テルマ
- Born: Thelma Juri Aoyama; 27 October 1987 (age 38); Yamatotakada, Nara, Japan
- Genres: Pop; R&B
- Occupation: Singer
- Years active: 2007–present
- Labels: Universal J; Polydor; NDY
- Spouse: Unknown (m. 2024)
- Website: www.thelma.jp

Thelma Aoyama (青山 テルマ, Aoyama Teruma; born 27 October 1987) is a Japanese pop and R&B singer. She is part Afro-Trinidadian and Japanese.

She is known for her collaboration song with SoulJa, "Koko ni Iru yo" and her answer song "Soba ni Iru ne". In September 2008, the Guinness World Records certified that "Soba ni Iru ne" was the best-selling digital download single in Japan with over two million "full-track" downloads (Chaku Uta Full). Including various forms of digital downloads, it sold over 8.7 million downloads by November 2008. The Guinness record was surpassed by Greeeen's song "Kiseki" in June 2009.

== Early life and education ==
She was born Thelma Juri Aoyama (青山テルマじゅり) and spent six years at Osaka International School as an elementary school student. At age 12, her family moved to Torrance, California, where she lived for two years and attended Calle Mayor Middle School. She returned to Japan in the winter of 2002, settling in Tokyo. Aoyama attended the American School in Japan. She attended Sophia University.

== Career ==
Aoyama was inspired to become a performer by Janet Jackson. Her first release in the music world was a collaboration on DS455's single "Summer Paradise: Risin' To Tha Sun, feat. Aoyama Thelma". The single reached #46 on the Oricon charts. On 9 September 2007, Aoyama made her solo debut with the single "One Way". This single debuted at No. 98 on the Oricon charts. Two weeks later, Aoyama was featured on the hit single "Koko ni Iru yo" with fellow J-Soul artist SoulJa. The single stayed on the charts for many weeks. The single sold over 100,000 copies and reached No. 6 on the charts.

In early 2008, Aoyama released an answer song to the single "Koko ni Iru yo" by SoulJa with her own single titled "Soba ni Iru ne" which also featured SoulJa. The songs are similar, and share the same chorus. However, the song "Soba ni Iru ne" proved to be more popular than the song "Koko ni Iru yo", debuting at No. 3 in its first week on the Oricon charts, and in its second week reached No. 1 on the charts. "Soba ni Iru ne" stayed in the Top 5 ranking for 7 consecutive weeks. It became the highest-selling female single (strictly a duet song) on the Oricon 2008 yearly charts.

The Japanese version of Hachi: A Dog's Tale uses "Wasurenai yo" by her as its theme song.

Her debut album, Diary, was released in Japan on 26 March 2008.

On 11 February 2009, she released the album Love!: Thelma Love Song Collection, which debuted at the number-one position on the Oricon weekly charts. Her album Emotions was released in September 2009.

Aoyama collaborated with Big Bang's Taeyang for her single, "Fall in Love", released on 27 January 2010.

Aoyama's single "Kaeru Basho" was released on 3 March 2010. The song was used in the movie Doraemon: Nobita's Great Battle of the Mermaid King. This single features SoulJa, and has a B side called "Anata ga Kiechaisode". Summer Love!! featuring Red Rice came out in 2010.

In 2010, she sang with the Taiwan pop group Da Mouth in a duet with the female lead singer Aisa, on the song "Secret Life". The song appears on the album Da First Episode.

Aoyama collaborated with Korean girl group 4Minute on the single, "Without U", released on 25 May 2011. The English version was released on 7 May 2011.

She contributed a cover of hide's "Tell Me" to the Tribute VI -Female Spirits- tribute album, which was released on 18 December 2013. She played the character Megumi Natsui in the 2022 television series, "Riding a Unicorn."

In 2021, Aoyama released her seventh studio album Scorpion Moon. She later released "Itsuma Demo" (いつまでも) in the following year with SoulJa. In 2023, Aoyama's label Universal J was dissolved following a restructure of Universal Music Japan. She was transferred to Polydor Records, however made no releases under the label.

In 2024, Aoyama announced her departure from Universal Japan. Launching her own independent label, she revealed the title of her eighth studio album, Easy Mode. The album was later released on 19 February 2025.

== Personal life ==
Aoyama is bilingual and speaks English and Japanese fluently. Born to an Afro-Trinidadian father and Japanese mother, Aoyama has expressed her experiences of racism and discrimination in both Japan and the United States. Following the murder of George Floyd in 2020, she shared a series of posts on social media regarding her support for the Black Lives Matter movement.

On 11 August 2024, Aoyama announced her marriage. On July 20, 2026, she announced that she had given birth to her first child, a son.

== Discography ==
- Diary (2008)
- Emotions (2009)
- Will (2011)
- Lonely Angel (2014)
- 10th Diary (2017)
- High School Gal (2018)
- Scorpion Moon (2021)
- Easy Mode (2025)
