= Wink discography =

- Studio albums: 14
- EPs: 1
- Live albums: 2
- Compilation albums: 11
- Singles: 26
- Video albums: 9 (Note: This includes the music video compilation albums and concert DVDs.)
- Box sets: 2
- Remix albums: 4

The discography of the Japanese idol duo Wink consists of 14 studio albums, 11 compilation albums, and 26 singles released since 1988.

== Albums ==
=== Studio albums ===
Year	Information	Oricon weekly peak position	Sales	RIAJ certification
1988	Moonlight Serenade: Released: July 1, 1988; Label: Polystar; Formats: LP, CD, cassette	52	50,000	
1989	Especially for You: Yasashisa ni Tsutsumarete: Released: April 26, 1989; Label: Polystar; Formats: LP, CD, cassette	1	508,000	Platinum
1989	Twin Memories: Released: December 1, 1989; Label: Polystar; Formats: CD, cassette	2	454,000	Platinum
1990	Velvet: Released: July 11, 1990; Label: Polystar; Formats: CD, cassette	4	198,000	Gold
1990	Crescent: Released: December 16, 1990; Label: Polystar; Formats: CD, cassette	10	164,000	
1991	Queen of Love: Released: July 10, 1991; Label: Polystar; Formats: CD, cassette	6	108,000	
1991	Sapphire: Released: November 25, 1991; Label: Polystar; Formats: CD, cassette	7	63,000	
1992	Each Side of Screen: Released: April 25, 1992; Label: Polystar; Formats: CD, cassette	11	58,000	
1992	Nocturne (Yasōkyoku): Released: November 26, 1992; Label: Polystar; Formats: CD, cassette	19	26,000	
1993	Aphrodite: Released: June 25, 1993; Label: Polystar; Formats: CD, cassette	33	21,000	
1993	Brunch: Released: November 26, 1993; Label: Polystar; Formats: CD, cassette	31	26,000	
1994	Overture!: Released: July 1, 1994; Label: Polystar; Formats: CD, cassette	34	23,000	
1994	Voce: Released: December 1, 1994; Label: Polystar; Formats: CD, cassette	58	16,000	
1995	Flyin' High: Released: July 5, 1995; Label: Polystar; Formats: CD, cassette	68	10,000	

=== Extended plays ===
Year	Information	Oricon weekly peak position	Sales	RIAJ certification
1988	At Heel Diamonds: Released: December 1, 1988; Label: Polystar; Formats: CD, cassette	6	345,000	

=== Live albums ===
Year	Information	Oricon weekly peak position	Sales	RIAJ certification
1990	Wink First Live Shining Star: Released: May 25, 1990; Label: Polystar; Formats: CD, cassette	1	111,000	Gold
2019	Especially for You II: Released: April 24, 2019; Label: Polystar; Formats: Digital	—		

=== Compilations ===
Year	Information	Oricon weekly peak position	Sales	RIAJ certification
1990	Wink Hot Singles: Released: November 1, 1990; Label: Polystar; Formats: CD, cassette	5	203,000	Gold
1992	Raisonné: Released: December 21, 1992; Label: Polystar; Formats: CD, cassette	18	58,000	
1994	Diary: Released: March 25, 1994; Label: Polystar; Formats: CD, cassette	23	49,000	
1995	Back to Front: Released: February 25, 1995; Label: Polystar; Formats: CD, cassette	93	4,000	
1995	Reminiscence: Released: November 25, 1995; Label: Polystar; Formats: CD, cassette	—		
1996	Wink Memories 1988–1996: Released: March 25, 1996; Label: Polystar; Formats: CD, cassette	35	22,000	
1999	Treasure Collection Wink Best: Released: June 30, 1999; Label: Polystar; Formats: CD, cassette	—		
2004	Wink Best & Best Deluxe: Released: 2004; Label: Polystar; Formats: CD	—		
2013	Selection: 25th Anniversary Self Selection: Released: June 5, 2013; Label: Polystar; Formats: CD	231		

=== Box sets ===
Year	Information	Oricon weekly peak position	Sales	RIAJ certification
2007	Wink Single Collection: 1988–1996 Singles Zenkyoku: Released: December 26, 2007; Label: Polystar; Formats: CD	—		
2008	Wink Album Collection: 1988–1996 Albums Zenkyoku: Released: February 27, 2008; Label: Polystar; Formats: CD	—		

=== Remix albums ===
Year	Information	Oricon weekly peak position	Sales	RIAJ certification
1991	Diamond Box: Released: December 21, 1991; Label: Polystar; Formats: CD, cassette	14	65,000	
1995	Wink Remixes: Released: September 1, 1995; Label: Polystar; Formats: CD, cassette	91	4,000	
1996	Jam the Wink: Released: September 11, 1996; Label: Polystar; Formats: CD, cassette	—		
2000	Para Para Wink!: Released: July 1, 2000; Label: Polystar; Formats: CD, cassette	—		

=== Karaoke albums ===
Year	Information	Oricon weekly peak position	Sales	RIAJ certification
1990	Fairy Tone: Released: April 10, 1990; Label: Polystar; Formats: CD, cassette	40		
1991	Fairy Tone 2: Released: November 25, 1991; Label: Polystar; Formats: CD, cassette	—		

== Singles ==
List of singles, with selected chart positions
Title	Date	Peak chart positions	Sales (JPN)	RIAJ certification	Album
Title	Date	Oricon Singles Charts	Sales (JPN)	RIAJ certification	Album
"Sugar Baby Love"	April 27, 1988	20	61,000		Moonlight Serenade
"Amaryllis"	September 7, 1988	30	14,000		Wink Hot Singles
"Ai ga Tomaranai (Turn It into Love)"	November 16, 1988	1	645,000		At Heel Diamonds
"Namida wo Misenai de (Boys Don't Cry)"	March 16, 1989	1	523,000	Platinum	Especially for You: Yasashisa ni Tsutsumarete
"Samishii Nettaigyo"	July 5, 1989	1	564,000	Platinum	Twin Memories
"One Night in Heaven (Mayonaka no Angel)"	November 11, 1989	1	423,000	Platinum	Twin Memories
"Sexy Music"	March 28, 1990	1	329,000	Gold	Velvet
"Yoru ni Hagurete (Where Were You Last Night)"	July 4, 1990	2	291,000	Gold	Crescent
"New Moon ni Aimashou"	November 21, 1990	2	249,000	Gold	Crescent
"Kitto Atsui Kuchibiru (Remain)"	March 20, 1991	2	175,000		Queen of Love
"Manatsu no Tremolo"	June 19, 1991	2	225,000	Gold	Queen of Love
"Haitoku no Scenario"	October 16, 1991	3	196,000		Sapphire
"Tsuioku no Heroine"	December 16, 1991	5	136,000		Each Side of Screen
"Matenrō Museum"	March 25, 1992	4	142,000		Each Side of Screen
"Furimukanaide"	July 22, 1992	7	132,000		Nocturne
"Real na Yume no Jōken"	October 21, 1992	10	90,000		Nocturne
"Eien no Ladydoll (Voyage, voyage)"	February 17, 1993	19	69,000		Aphrodite
"Kekkon Shiyoune"	May 26, 1993	15	75,000		Aphrodite
"Sakihokore Itoshisa yo"	September 8, 1993	9	337,000	Gold	Brunch
"Itsumademo Suki de Itakute"	February 23, 1994	19	79,000		Overture!
"Twinkle Twinkle"	May 26, 1994	28	74,000		Overture!
"Cherie Mon Cherie"	October 26, 1994	29	25,000		Voce
"Watashitachi Rashii Rule"	March 1, 1995	46	16,000		Flyin' High
"Jive Into the Night (Yaban na Yoru ni)" [Hyper Euro Mix]	June 25, 1995	92	6,000		Flyin' High
"Angel Love Story (Akiiro no Tenshi)"	September 15, 1995	62	8,000		Reminiscence
"Special to Me"	April 27, 2018	196			Twin Memories
"—" denotes releases that did not chart.

== Videography ==
=== Music video albums ===
List of media, with selected chart positions
Title	Album details	Peak positions		Sales (Oricon)
Title	Album details	JPN DVD	JPN Blu-ray	Sales (Oricon)
Heart on Wave	Released: July 25, 1989; Label: Polystar; Formats: LD, VHS	—	—	N/A
Winkissimo: Hawaii And L.A. Days, 1990	Released: September 25, 1990; Label: Polystar; Formats: LD, VHS	—	—	N/A
Heart on Wave II	Released: December 16, 1990; Label: Polystar; Formats: LD, VHS	—	—	N/A
Wink Visual Memories 1988–1996	Released: May 26, 2004; Label: Polystar; Formats: DVD	—	—	N/A
Wink Visual Collection 1988–1996	Released: April 27, 2008; Label: Polystar; Formats: DVD	—	—	N/A
Wink Visual Memories 1988–1996: 30th Limited Edition	Released: April 24, 2019; Label: Polystar; Formats: DVD	63	—	N/A

=== Live video albums ===
List of media, with selected chart positions
Title	Album details	Peak positions		Sales (Oricon)
Title	Album details	JPN DVD	JPN Blu-ray	Sales (Oricon)
Wink First Live Shining Star: Dreamy Concert Tour on 1990	Released: July 16, 1990; Label: Polystar; Formats: LD, VHS	—	—	N/A
Wink Performance Memories +	Released: May 26, 2004; Label: Polystar; Formats: DVD	—	—	N/A
Wink Performance Memories: 30th Limited Edition	Released: April 24, 2019; Label: Polystar; Formats: DVD	80	—	N/A
