= Wink Memories 1988–1996 =

Compilation album by Wink
- Released: March 25, 1996
- Recorded: 1988–1995
- Genre: J-pop; dance-pop
- Length: 1:46:11
- Language: Japanese
- Label: Polystar
- Producer: Haruo Mizuhashi

Wink chronology
Reminiscence (1995)	Wink Memories 1988–1996 (1996)	Jam the Wink (1996)

Wink Memories 1988–1996 is the sixth compilation album by Japanese idol duo Wink, released by Polystar on March 25, 1996. The two-disc album compiles all of the duo's singles from 1988 to 1995. A limited edition release included a bonus karaoke CD. This was the duo's final release before they officially disbanded six days later on March 31.

The album peaked at No. 35 on Oricon's albums chart and sold over 22,000 copies.

== Track listing ==
All lyrics are written by Neko Oikawa, except where indicated.

Disc 1
No.	Title	Lyrics	Music	Arrangement	Length
1.	"Sugar Baby Love"	Joe Lemon	Wayne Bickerton; Tony Waddington	Shirō Sagisu	3:51
2.	"Amaryllis" (Amaririsu (アマリリス))	Yukinojo Mori	Ken Satō	Shigeru Suzuki	3:54
3.	"Ai ga Tomaranai (Turn It into Love)" ((愛が止まらない 〜TURN IT INTO LOVE〜; "Love Doesn't Stop ~Turn It into Love~"))		Mike Stock; Matt Aitken; Pete Waterman	Motoki Funayama	3:32
4.	"Namida wo Misenai de (Boys Don't Cry)" ((涙をみせないで～Boys Don't Cry～; "Don't Show Your Tears"))		Matjaž Kosi	Funayama	3:45
5.	"Samishii Nettaigyo" ((淋しい熱帯魚; "Lonely Tropical Fish"))		Masaya Ozeki	Funayama	4:28
6.	"One Night in Heaven (Mayonaka no Angel)" ((One Night In Heaven 〜真夜中のエンジェル〜; "One Night in Heaven ~Midnight Angel~"))	Takashi Matsumoto	Steve Lironi; Dan Navarro	Funayama	4:07
7.	"Sexy Music"		Ben Findon; Mike Myers; Bob Puzey	Satoshi Kadokura	3:41
8.	"Yoru ni Hagurete (Where Were You Last Night)" ((夜にはぐれて 〜Where Were You Last Night〜))		Norell Oson Bard	S. Kadokura	4:25
9.	"New Moon ni Aimashou" (Nyū Mūn ni Aimashō (ニュー・ムーンに逢いましょう; "Meet the New Moon"))		Yuki Kadokura	S. Kadokura	4:22
10.	"Kitto Atsui Kuchibiru (Remain)" (Kitto Atsui Kuchibiru ~Rimein~ (きっと熱いくちびる 〜リメイン〜; "I'm Sure It's Hot (Remain)"))		Anri Sekine	S. Kadokura	4:40
11.	"Manatsu no Tremolo" (Manatsu no Toremoro (真夏のトレモロ; "Midsummer Tremolo"))		Takashi Kudō	S. Kadokura	4:04
12.	"Haitoku no Scenario" (Haitoku no Shinario (背徳のシナリオ; "An Immoral Scenario"))		Kudō	S. Kadokura	4:26
13.	"Tsuioku no Heroine" (Tsuioku no Hiroin (追憶のヒロイン; "Reminiscent Heroine"))		Y. Kadokura	S. Kadokura	4:20

Disc 2
No.	Title	Lyrics	Music	Arrangement	Length
1.	"Matenrō Museum" (Matenrō Myūjiamu (摩天楼ミュージアム; "Skyscraper Museum"))		Kudō	S. Kadokura	4:16
2.	"Furimukanaide" ((ふりむかないで; "Don't Look Back"))	Tokiko Iwatani	Hiroshi Miyagawa	S. Kadokura	4:07
3.	"Real na Yume no Jōken" (Riaru na Yume no Jōken (リアルな夢の条件; "Real Dream Conditions"))		Osny S. Melo	S. Kadokura	4:38
4.	"Eien no Ladydoll (Voyage, Voyage)" (Eien no redīdōru ~Voyage, Voyage~ (永遠のレディードール 〜Voyage Voyage〜; "Eternal Ladydoll ~Voyage, Voyage"))		Jean-Michel Rivat; Dominique Dubois	Funayama	4:58
5.	"Kekkon Shiyoune" ((結婚しようね; "Let's Get Married"))	Chinfa Kan	S. Kadokura	S. Kadokura	4:14
6.	"Sakihokore Itoshisa yo" ((咲き誇れ愛しさよ; "It's in Full Bloom and Love"))	Maki Ohguro	Tetsurō Oda	Takeshi Hayama	3:31
7.	"Itsumademo Suki de Itakute" ((いつまでも好きでいたくて; "I Want to Love You Forever"))	Yasushi Akimoto	Kazuhiko Katō	S. Kadokura	4:42
8.	"Twinkle Twinkle" (Tuinkuru Tuinkuru (トゥインクル トゥインクル))	Akimoto	James Shimoji	Y. Kadokura	4:38
9.	"Cherie Mon Cherie" (Sherī Mon Sheri (シェリー モン シェリ))	Rui Serizawa	S. Kadokura		4:42
10.	"Watashitachi Rashii Rule" (Watashitachi Rashī Rūru (私たちらしいルール; "Our Own Rules"))	Akimoto	Masamichi Sugi	S. Kadokura	4:13
11.	"Jive Into the Night (Yaban na Yoru ni) [Hyper Euro Mix]" ((JIVE INTO THE NIGHT 〜野蛮な夜に〜 [HYPER EURO MIX]; "Jive Into the Night ~Savage Night~"))		Sergio Portaluri; David Sion; Fulvio Zafret	MST	4:06
12.	"Angel Love Story (Akiiro no Tenshi)" ((Angel Love Story 〜秋色の天使〜; "Angel Love Story ~Autumn Colored Angel~"))	Hiroshi Yamada; Katsuo Hana	Masahiro Ikumi	Ikumi	4:54

Limited Edition bonus CD
No.	Title	Length
1.	"Sugar Baby Love" (Original Karaoke)	3:52
2.	"Amaryllis" (Original Karaoke)	3:56
3.	"Ai ga Tomaranai (Turn It into Love)" (Original Karaoke)	3:30
4.	"Namida wo Misenai de (Boys Don't Cry)" (Original Karaoke)	3:45
5.	"Samishii Nettaigyo" (Original Karaoke)	4:30
6.	"One Night in Heaven (Mayonaka no Angel)" (Original Karaoke)	4:08
7.	"Sexy Music" (Original Karaoke)	3:43
8.	"Yoru ni Hagurete (Where Were You Last Night)" (Original Karaoke)	4:25
9.	"New Moon ni Aimashō" (Original Karaoke)	4:24
10.	"Kitto Atsui Kuchibiru (Remain)" (Original Karaoke)	4:41
11.	"Manatsu no Tremolo" (Original Karaoke)	4:05
12.	"Haitoku no Scenario" (Original Karaoke)	4:27
13.	"Kekkon Shiyoune" (Original Karaoke)	4:12
14.	"Sakihokore Itoshisa yo" (Original Karaoke)	3:30
15.	"Itsumademo Suki de Itakute" (Original Karaoke)	4:42
16.	"Twinkle Twinkle" (Original Karaoke)	4:19
17.	"Watashitachi Rashii Rule" (Original Karaoke)	4:14
18.	"Jive Into the Night (Yaban na Yoru ni) [House Mix]" (Original Karaoke)	4:07
19.	"Angel Love Story (Aki-iro no Tenshi)" (Original Karaoke)	4:55

== Charts ==
Chart (1996)	Peak position
Japanese Albums (Oricon)	35
