= Reminiscence (Wink album) =

Compilation album by Wink
- Released: November 25, 1995
- Recorded: 1988–1995
- Genre: J-pop; dance-pop
- Length: 72:41
- Language: Japanese
- Label: Polystar
- Producer: Haruo Mizuhashi

Wink chronology
| Wink Remixes (1995) | Reminiscence (1995) | Wink Memories 1988–1996 (1996) |

Singles from Reminiscence
- 1. "Angel Love Story (Akiiro no Tenshi)" Released: September 15, 1995

Reminiscence (レミニセンス, Reminisensu) is the fifth compilation album by Japanese idol duo Wink, released by Polystar on November 25, 1995. The album compiles a selection of the duo's singles from 1988 to 1995 and features the single "Angel Love Story (Akiiro no Tenshi)" and the song "Merry Little X'mas".

== Track listing ==
All lyrics are written by Neko Oikawa, except where indicated

| No. | Title | Lyrics | Music | Arrangement | Length |
|---|---|---|---|---|---|
| 1. | "Angel Love Story (Akiiro no Tenshi)" ((Angel Love Story 〜秋色の天使〜, "Angel Love Story ~Autumn Colored Angel~")) | Hiroshi Yamada; Katsuo Hana | Masahiro Ikumi | Ikumi | 4:54 |
| 2. | "Twinkle Twinkle [1995 Classic Mix]" (Tuinkuru Tuinkuru (トゥインクル トゥインクル[1995 CLASSIC MIX])) | Yasushi Akimoto | James Shimoji | Yuki Kadokura | 4:32 |
| 3. | "Jive Into the Night (Yaban na Yoru ni) [Hyper Euro Mix]" ((JIVE INTO THE NIGHT 〜野蛮な夜に〜 [HYPER EURO MIX], "Jive Into the Night ~Savage Night~")) | | Sergio Portaluri; David Sion; Fulvio Zafret | MST | 4:06 |
| 4. | "Yoru ni Hagurete (Where Were You Last Night)" ((夜にはぐれて 〜Where Were You Last Night〜)) | | Norell Oson Bard | Satoshi Kadokura | 4:24 |
| 5. | "Ai ga Tomaranai (Turn It into Love) [Bad Yards Rock It Into Dub]" ((愛が止まらない 〜TURN IT INTO LOVE〜[BAD YARDS ROCK IT INTO DUB], "Love Doesn't Stop ~Turn It into Love~")) | | Mike Stock; Matt Aitken; Pete Waterman | Motoki Funayama | 4:00 |
| 6. | "One Night in Heaven (Mayonaka no Angel)" ((One Night In Heaven 〜真夜中のエンジェル〜, "One Night in Heaven ~Midnight Angel~")) | Takashi Matsumoto | Steve Lironi; Dan Navarro | Funayama | 4:06 |
| 7. | "Eien no Ladydoll (Voyage, Voyage)" (Eien no redīdōru ~Voyage, Voyage~ (永遠のレディードール 〜Voyage Voyage〜, "Eternal Ladydoll ~Voyage, Voyage")) | | Jean-Michel Rivat; Dominique Dubois | Funayama | 4:58 |
| 8. | "Cherie Mon Cherie" (Sherī Mon Sheri (シェリー モン シェリ)) | Rui Serizawa | S. Kadokura | | 4:42 |
| 9. | "Manatsu no Tremolo" (Manatsu no Toremoro (真夏のトレモロ, "Midsummer Tremolo")) | | Takashi Kudō | S. Kadokura | 4:04 |
| 10. | "Sakihokore Itoshisa yo" ((咲き誇れ愛しさよ, "It's in Full Bloom and Love")) | Maki Ohguro | Tetsurō Oda | Takeshi Hayama | 3:31 |
| 11. | "Itsumademo Suki de Itakute" ((いつまでも好きでいたくて, "I Want to Love You Forever")) | Akimoto | Kazuhiko Katō | S. Kadokura | 4:39 |
| 12. | "Kitto Atsui Kuchibiru (Remain)" (Kitto Atsui Kuchibiru ~Rimein~ (きっと熱いくちびる 〜リメイン〜, "I'm Sure It's Hot (Remain)")) | | Anri Sekine | S. Kadokura | 4:39 |
| 13. | "Ai ga Tomaranai (Turn It into Love)" ((愛が止まらない 〜TURN IT INTO LOVE〜, "Love Doesn't Stop ~Turn It into Love~")) | | Stock; Aitken; Waterman | Funayama | 3:31 |
| 14. | "Samishii Nettaigyo" ((淋しい熱帯魚, "Lonely Tropical Fish")) | | Masaya Ozeki | Funayama | 4:29 |
| 15. | "Kekkon Shiyoune" ((結婚しようね, "Let's Get Married")) | Chinfa Kan | S. Kadokura | S. Kadokura | 4:15 |
| 16. | "Merry Little X’mas" | Sumiyo Mutsumi | Masamichi Sugi | S. Kadokura | 3:41 |
