= Diary (Wink album) =

Compilation album by Wink
- Released: March 25, 1994
- Recorded: 1988–1993
- Genres: J-pop; dance-pop
- Length: 68:03
- Language: Japanese
- Label: Polystar
- Producer: Haruo Mizuhashi

Wink chronology
Brunch (1993)	Diary (1994)	Overture! (1994)

Diary: Wink Best Album (ダイアリー, Daiarī) is the third compilation album by Japanese idol duo Wink, released by Polystar on December 21, 1992. It covers the duo's singles and B-sides from 1988 to 1993.

The album peaked at No. 23 on Oricon's albums chart and sold over 49,000 copies.

== Track listing ==
All lyrics are written by Neko Oikawa, except where indicated.

No.	Title	Lyrics	Music	Arrangement	Length
1.	"Itsumademo Suki de Itakute" ((いつまでも好きでいたくて; "I Want to Love You Forever"))	Yasushi Akimoto	Kazuhiko Katō	Satoshi Kadokura	4:42
2.	"Sakihokore Itoshisa yo" ((咲き誇れ愛しさよ; "It's in Full Bloom and Love"))	Maki Ohguro	Tetsurō Oda	Takeshi Hayama	3:33
3.	"Movin' On"	Rui Serizawa	Sara Dallin; Keren Woodward; Mike Stock; Pete Waterman	Shingo Kobayashi	5:21
4.	"Oitsumetai" ((追いつめたい; "I Want to Catch Up"))	Masami Tozawa	Kiichi Yokoyama	Ian Prince	4:25
5.	"Kekkon Shiyoune" ((結婚しようね; "Let's Get Married"))	Chinfa Kan	S. Kadokura	S. Kadokura	4:14
6.	"Image na Kankei" (Imāju na Kankei (イマージュな関係; "Image Relationship"))		Toshiaki Matsumoto	S. Kadokura	4:47
7.	"Haitoku no Scenario" (Haitoku no Shinario (背徳のシナリオ; "An Immoral Scenario"))		Takashi Kudō	S. Kadokura	4:27
8.	"Manatsu no Tremolo" (Manatsu no Toremoro (真夏のトレモロ; "Midsummer Tremolo"))		Kudō	S. Kadokura	4:05
9.	"New Moon ni Aimashou" (Nyū Mūn ni Aimashō (ニュー・ムーンに逢いましょう; "Meet the New Moon"))		Yuki Kadokura	S. Kadokura	4:24
10.	"Yoru ni Hagurete (Where Were You Last Night)" ((夜にはぐれて 〜Where Were You Last Night〜))		Norell Oson Bard	S. Kadokura	4:25
11.	"Sexy Music"		Ben Findon; Mike Myers; Bob Puzey	S. Kadokura	3:41
12.	"One Night in Heaven (Mayonaka no Angel)" ((One Night In Heaven 〜真夜中のエンジェル〜; "One Night in Heaven ~Midnight Angel~"))	Takashi Matsumoto	Steve Lironi; Dan Navarro	Motoki Funayama	4:07
13.	"Samishii Nettaigyo" ((淋しい熱帯魚; "Lonely Tropical Fish"))		Masaya Ozeki	Funayama	4:30
14.	"Especially for You: Yasashisa ni Tsutsumarete" ((Especially For You 〜優しさにつつまれて〜; "Especially for You: Surrounded by Kindness"))		Stock; Matt Aitken; Waterman	Funayama	4:09
15.	"Namida wo Misenai de (Boys Don't Cry)" ((涙をみせないで～Boys Don't Cry～; "Don't Show Your Tears"))		Matjaž Kosi	Funayama	3:44
16.	"Ai ga Tomaranai (Turn It into Love)" ((愛が止まらない 〜TURN IT INTO LOVE〜; "Love Doesn't Stop ~Turn It into Love~"))		Stock; Aitken; Waterman	Funayama	3:29
Total length:					68:03

== Charts ==
Chart (1994)	Peak position
Japanese Albums (Oricon)	23
