= Selection: 25th Anniversary Self Selection =

Selection: 25h Anniversary Self Selection

Compilation album by Wink
- Released: June 5, 2013
- Recorded: 1988–1995
- Genre: J-pop; dance-pop
- Length: 2:02:36
- Language: Japanese
- Label: Polystar
- Producer: Haruo Mizuhashi

Wink chronology
Wink Album Collection: 1988–1996 Albums Zenkyoku (2008)	Selection: 25h Anniversary Self Selection (2013)	Especially for You II (2019)

Selection: 25h Anniversary Self Selection is a compilation album by Japanese idol duo Wink, released by Polystar on June 5, 2013. The two-disc album compiles the duo's singles, B-sides, and deep cuts selected by members Sachiko Suzuki and Shoko Aida.

The album peaked at No. 231 on Oricon's albums chart.

== Track listing ==
All lyrics are written by Neko Oikawa, except where indicated.

Disc 1
No.	Title	Lyrics	Music	Arrangement	Length
1.	"Especially for You: Yasashisa ni Tsutsumarete" ((Especially For You 〜優しさにつつまれて〜; "Especially for You: Surrounded by Kindness"))		Mike Stock; Matt Aitken; Pete Waterman	Motoki Funayama	4:09
2.	"Ichiban Kanashii Bara" ((いちばん哀しい薔薇; "The Saddest Rose"))		Kisaburō Suzuki	Funayama	4:25
3.	"Samishii Nettaigyo" ((淋しい熱帯魚; "Lonely Tropical Fish"))		Masaya Ozeki	Funayama	4:30
4.	"Anata ga Door wo Akeru Yoru" (Anata ga Doa wo Akeru Yoru (あなたがドアを開ける夜; "The Night You Open the Door"))	Yūho Iwasato	Chika Ueda	Satoshi Kadokura	4:39
5.	"Alone Again (Note: Cover of Windham Hill's "Nothing Means More to Me Than You".)"	Rui Serizawa	Jamey Jaz; Ren Toppano; Viqui Denman	S. Kadokura	4:40
6.	"Koi no Junan ni Yōkoso" ((恋の受難にようこそ; "Welcome to the Suffering of Love"))		Ozeki	Funayama	4:36
7.	"Tsuki to Taiyō" ((月と太陽; "Moon and Sun"))	Arika Takarano	Tetsurō Kashibuchi	Kashibuchi	4:16
8.	"Movin' On"	Serizawa	Sara Dallin; Keren Woodward; Stock; Waterman	Shingo Kobayashi	5:21
9.	"One Night in Heaven (Mayonaka no Angel)" ((One Night In Heaven 〜真夜中のエンジェル〜; "One Night in Heaven ~Midnight Angel~"))	Takashi Matsumoto	Steve Lironi; Dan Navarro	Funayama	4:07
10.	"Yakan Hikō (Never Marry a Railroad Man)" ((夜間飛行 〜Never Marry A Railroad Man〜; "Night Flight ~Never Marry a Railroad Man~"))	Sayako Morimoto	Robbie van Leeuwen	Takao Sugiyama	4:14
11.	"Tsukiyo no Shinjugai" ((月夜の真珠貝; "Moonlit Pearl Shell"))		Ozeki	S. Kadokura	4:45
12.	"Haitoku no Scenario" (Haitoku no Shinario (背徳のシナリオ; "An Immoral Scenario"))		Kudō	S. Kadokura	4:27
13.	"Special to Me"		Deborah F. Shane; Robert Hunter Caldwell; Marsha A. Radcliffe	Funayama	3:39

Disc 2
No.	Title	Lyrics	Music	Arrangement	Length
1.	"Twinkle Twinkle" (Tuinkuru Tuinkuru (トゥインクル トゥインクル))	Yasushi Akimoto	James Shimoji	Yuki Kadokura	4:19
2.	"Omoide made Soba ni Ite (Welcome to the Edge)" ((想い出までそばにいて (Welcome To The Edge); "I'll Stay by Your Side Until You Remember (Welcome to the Edge)"))		Billie Hughes; Roxanne Seeman; Dominic Messinger	S. Kadokura	5:06
3.	"Ai ga Tomaranai (Turn It into Love)" ((愛が止まらない 〜TURN IT INTO LOVE〜; "Love Doesn't Stop ~Turn It into Love~"))		Stock; Aitken; Waterman	Funayama	3:32
4.	"Honey Bee"	Serizawa	Hirofumi Asamoto	S. Kadokura	5:03
5.	"Unshakable"	Morimoto	Patrick DeRemer; Jan Buckingham	S. Kadokura	5:01
6.	"Aishiteru (Never Stopped Loving You)" ((愛してる 〜Never Stopped Loving You〜; "I Love You ~Never Stopped Loving You~"))		Paul Gurvitz	Funayama	5:06
7.	"Eien no Ladydoll (Voyage, Voyage)" (Eien no redīdōru ~Voyage, Voyage~ (永遠のレディードール 〜Voyage Voyage〜; "Eternal Ladydoll ~Voyage, Voyage"))		Jean-Michel Rivat; Dominique Dubois	Funayama	4:58
8.	"New Moon ni Aimashou" (Nyū Mūn ni Aimashō (ニュー・ムーンに逢いましょう; "Meet the New Moon"))		Y. Kadokura	S. Kadokura	4:24
9.	"Jūnigatsu no Orihime" ((12月の織姫; "Orihime in December"))		Hughes; Marcy Levy; Seeman	S. Kadokura	4:48
10.	"Awa ni Naru (Endless Summer)" ((泡になる 〜Endless Summer〜; "Become a Bubble ~Endless Summer~"))	Serizawa	Junko Hirotani	S. Kadokura	5:24
11.	"Shake It"	Yoshiko Miura	KE-Y	S. Kadokura	4:45
12.	"Maboroshi ga Sakenderu" ((幻が叫んでる; "The Illusion Is Screaming"))		Tomofumi Suzuki	Tsukasa Ebisu	4:26
13.	"Tokubetsu na Ichinichi" ((特別な一日; "A Special Day"))	Kyōko Endō	Endō	S. Kadokura	7:54

== Charts ==
Chart (2013)	Peak position
Japanese Albums (Oricon)	231
