= Diamond Box =

Remix album by Wink
- Released: December 21, 1991
- Recorded: 1989–1991
- Genres: J-pop; dance-pop
- Length: 48:23
- Language: Japanese
- Label: Polystar
- Producer: Haruo Mizuhashi

Wink chronology
Sapphire (1991)	Diamond Box (1991)	Each Side of Screen (1992)

Diamond Box: Wink Best Selection Disc is the first remix album by Japanese idol duo Wink, released by Polystar on December 21, 1991. It features four remixed songs and two medley tracks.

The album peaked at No. 14 on Oricon's albums chart and sold over 65,000 copies.

== Track listing ==
All lyrics are written by Neko Oikawa, except where indicated; all music is arranged by Satoshi Kadokura, except where indicated.

No.	Title	Lyrics	Music	Arrangement	Length
1.	"Non Stop I" (Non Sutoppu Wan (ノンストップ I))	See below			5:05
2.	"New Moon ni Aimashou [Remix]" (Nyū Mūn ni Aimashō (ニュー・ムーンに逢いましょう; "Meet the New Moon"))		Yuki Kadokura		4:49
3.	"Kitto Atsui Kuchibiru (Remain) [Remix]" (Kitto Atsui Kuchibiru ~Rimein~ (きっと熱いくちびる 〜リメイン〜; "I'm Sure It's Hot (Remain)"))		Anri Sekine		4:25
4.	"Haitoku no Scenario [Remix]" (Haitoku no Shinario (背徳のシナリオ; "An Immoral Scenario"))		Takashi Kudō		4:28
5.	"Omoide made Soba ni Ite (Welcome to the Edge) [Album Version]" ((想い出までそばにいて (Welcome To The Edge); "I'll Stay by Your Side Until You Remember (Welcome to the Edge)"))		Billie Hughes; Roxanne Seeman; Dominic Messinger		5:05
6.	"Ame ni Negai wo" ((雨に願いを; "Wishing for the Rain"))		Masaya Ozeki		4:17
7.	"Non Stop II" (Non Sutoppu Tsū (ノンストップ II))	See below			5:09
8.	"Manatsu no Tremolo [Remix]" (Manatsu no Toremoro (真夏のトレモロ; "Midsummer Tremolo"))		Takashi Kudō		4:39
9.	"Aishiteru (Never Stopped Loving You)" ((愛してる 〜Never Stopped Loving You〜; "I Love You ~Never Stopped Loving You~"))		Paul Gurvitz	Motoki Funayama	5:02
10.	"Awa ni Naru (Endless Summer)" ((泡になる 〜Endless Summer〜; "Become a Bubble ~Endless Summer~"))	Rui Serizawa	Junko Hirotani		5:24
Total length:					48:23

Non Stop I
No.	Title	Lyrics	Music	Length
1.	"Ano Yoru e Kaeritai (Step Back in Time)" ((あの夜へ帰りたい 〜Step Back In Time〜; "I Want to Go Back to That Night ~Step Back in Time~"))	Hiroko Ezaki	Mike Stock; Matt Aitken; Pete Waterman
2.	"Sexy Music"		Ben Findon; Mike Myers; Bob Puzey
3.	"Warui Yume (I Was Made for Loving You)" ((悪い夢 〜I Was Made for Loving You〜; "A Bad Dream ~I Was Made for Loving You~"))		Paul Stanley; Vini Poncia; Desmond Child
4.	"Ginsei Club (I'm in Mood for Dancing)" ((銀星倶楽部 〜I'm In Mood For Dancing〜))	Sayako Morimoto	Findon; Myers; Puzey
Total length:				5:05

Non Stop II
No.	Title	Lyrics	Music	Length
1.	"Special to Me"		Deborah F. Shane; Robert Hunter Caldwell; Marsha A. Radcliffe
2.	"Only Lonely (Body Language)"		Findon; Myers; Puzey
3.	"Mighty Mighty Love"	Morimoto	Rick Evans
4.	"Yakan Hikō (Never Marry a Railroad Man)" ((夜間飛行 〜Never Marry A Railroad Man〜; "Night Flight ~Never Marry a Railroad Man~"))	Morimoto	Robbie van Leeuwen
Total length:				5:09

== Charts ==
Chart (1991)	Peak position
Japanese Albums (Oricon)	14
