= Brunch (album) =

1993 studio album by Wink

Studio album by Wink
- Released: November 26, 1993
- Recorded: 1993
- Genres: J-pop; dance-pop
- Length: 46:26
- Language: Japanese
- Label: Polystar
- Producer: Haruo Mizuhashi

Wink chronology
| Aphrodite (1993) | Brunch (1993) | Diary (1994) |

Singles from Brunch
- 1. "Sakihokore Itoshisa yo" Released: September 8, 1993

Brunch (ブランチ, Buranchi) is the 11th studio album by Japanese idol duo Wink, released by Polystar on November 26, 1993. It features the single "Sakihokore Itoshisa yo". Also included in the album are Japanese-language covers of Bananarama's "Movin' On" and Foreigner's "I Want to Know What Love Is". Brunch was the first album since Moonlight Serenade to not involve songwriting by Neko Oikawa.

The album peaked at No. 31 on Oricon's albums chart and sold over 26,000 copies.

== Track listing ==
| No. | Title | Lyrics | Music | Arrangement | Length |
|---|---|---|---|---|---|
| 1. | "Movin' On" | Rui Serizawa | Sara Dallin; Keren Woodward; Mike Stock; Pete Waterman | Shingo Kobayashi | 5:21 |
| 2. | "Made in Love" | Serizawa | Seshirō Kusunose | Satoshi Kadokura | 4:44 |
| 3. | "Namida wo Semenai de (You've Gone Too Far)" ((涙を責めないで; "Don't Blame the Tears")) | Yumi Yoshimoto | Patrick DeRemer; Jeff Pescetto | Ian Prince | 4:18 |
| 4. | "Dare mo Shiranai" ((誰も知らない; "No One Knows")) | Serizawa | Osny S. Melo | Prince | 4:41 |
| 5. | "Mikazuki no Yoru no Kotoritachi" ((三日月の夜の小鳥たち; "The Night of the Crescent Moon's Songbirds")) | Masami Tozawa | Mick Jones | Kobayashi | 5:29 |
| 6. | "Oitsumetai" ((追いつめたい; "I Want to Catch Up")) | Tozawa | Kiichi Yokoyama | Prince | 4:25 |
| 7. | "Sakihokore Itoshisa yo" ((咲き誇れ愛しさよ; "It's in Full Bloom and Love")) | Maki Ohguro | Tetsurō Oda | Takeshi Hayama | 3:31 |
| 8. | "Anata e no Omoi" ((あなたへの想い; "Feelings for You")) | Sachiko Suzuki | Takao Kisugi | Kobayashi | 4:35 |
| 9. | "Ai wo Komete" ((愛を込めて; "With Love")) | Shoko Aida | Aida | Kobayashi | 5:24 |
| 10. | "Drop" (Doroppu (ドロップ)) | Kanata Asamizu | Takako Nakano | Tsukasa Ebisu | 3:58 |
| Total length: | | | | | 46:26 |

== Charts ==
| Chart (1993) | Peak position |
|---|---|
| Japanese Albums (Oricon) | 31 |
