= Aphrodite (Wink album) =

Studio album by Wink
- Released: June 25, 1993
- Recorded: 1992–1993
- Genre: J-pop; dance-pop
- Length: 45:37
- Language: Japanese
- Label: Polystar
- Producer: Keiichi Suzuki

Wink chronology
Raisonné (1992)	Aphrodite (1993)	Brunch (1993)

Singles from Aphrodite
- 1. "Eien no Ladydoll (Voyage, Voyage)" Released: February 17, 1993; 2. "Kekkon Shiyoune" Released: May 26, 1993

Aphrodite (アプロデーテ, Apurodēte) (stylized as Αφροδιτη) is the tenth studio album by Japanese idol duo Wink, produced by Keiichi Suzuki and released by Polystar on June 25, 1993. It features the singles "Eien no Ladydoll (Voyage, Voyage)" (a cover of Desireless' "Voyage, voyage") and "Kekkon Shiyoune". In contrast to the duo's previous albums, Aphrodite contains only one cover song.

The album peaked at No. 33 on Oricon's albums chart and sold over 21,000 copies.

== Track listing ==
No.	Title	Lyrics	Music	Arrangement	Length
1.	"Kekkon Shiyoune" ((結婚しようね; "Let's Get Married"))	Chinfa Kan	Satoshi Kadokura	Kadokura	4:14
2.	"Natsu ni Aenakute" ((夏に会えなくて; "We Can't Meet in the Summer"))	Rui Serizawa	Kanji Ishikawa	Ryōmei Shirai	4:49
3.	"Fishselfish"	Wakako Kaku	Yasuhiro Kido	Shirai	4:00
4.	"Save My Life"	Serizawa	Shōko Suzuki	Shirai	3:54
5.	"Watashi Mitai ni Iikagen na Kareshi" ((私みたいにいいかげんな彼氏; "A Sloppy Boyfriend Like Me"))	Kan	Osny S. Melo	Melo	4:24
6.	"Tsuki to Taiyō" ((月と太陽; "Moon and Sun"))	Arika Takarano	Tetsurō Kashibuchi	Kashibuchi	4:16
7.	"Eien no Ladydoll (Voyage, Voyage)" (Eien no redīdōru ~Voyage, Voyage~ (永遠のレディードール 〜Voyage Voyage〜; "Eternal Ladydoll ~Voyage, Voyage"))	Neko Oikawa	Jean-Michel Rivat; Dominique Dubois	Motoki Funayama	4:58
8.	"Maboroshi ga Sakenderu" ((幻が叫んでる; "The Illusion Is Screaming"))	Oikawa	Tomofumi Suzuki	Tsukasa Ebisu	4:26
9.	"I Wanna Leave You"	Sachiko Suzuki (as Miyoko A.)	Kadokura	Kadokura	4:55
10.	"Oshiete" ((おしえて; "Tell Me"))	Shoko Aida	Aida	Kadokura	5:41
Total length:					45:37

2018 bonus track
No.	Title	Lyrics	Music	Arrangement	Length
11.	"Alone Again (Note: Cover of Windham Hill's "Nothing Means More to Me Than You".)"	Serizawa	Jamey Jaz; Ren Toppano; Viqui Denman	Kadokura	4:38

== Charts ==
Chart (1993)	Peak position
Japanese Albums (Oricon)	33
