= Voce (album) =

Studio album by Wink
- Released: December 1, 1994
- Recorded: 1994
- Genre: J-pop
- Length: 49:19
- Language: Japanese
- Label: Polystar
- Producer: Haruo Mizuhashi

Wink chronology
Overture! (1994)	Voce (1994)	Back to Front (1995)

Singles from Voce
- 1. "Cherie Mon Cherie" Released: October 26, 1994

Voce (ヴォーチェ, Vōche) is the 13th studio album by Japanese idol duo Wink, released by Polystar on December 1, 1994. It features the single "Cherie Mon Cherie". Like the duo's previous release Overture! the album consists of completely original songs.

The album peaked at No. 58 on Oricon's albums chart and sold over 16,000 copies.

== Track listing ==
All music is arranged by Satoshi Kadokura.

No.	Title	Lyrics	Music	Length
1.	"Sore wa Kiss de Hajimatta" ((それはKissで始まった; "It Started with a Kiss"))	Rui Serizawa	Masamichi Sugi	3:37
2.	"Honey Bee"	Serizawa	Hirofumi Asamoto	5:03
3.	"Cherie Mon Cherie" (Sherī Mon Sheri (シェリー モン シェリ))	Serizawa	Kadokura	4:42
4.	"Sore Demo Ii no" ((それでもいいの; "Is It Okay?"))	Yasushi Akimoto	Kazuo Zaitsu	4:38
5.	"Anata ga Door wo Akeru Yoru" (Anata ga Doa wo Akeru Yoru (あなたがドアを開ける夜; "The Night You Open the Door"))	Yūho Iwasato	Chika Ueda	4:40
6.	"Please Please Me"	Ueda	Ueda	4:06
7.	"Sunny Day"	Serizawa	Sugi	4:21
8.	"Hadashi no Marionette" (Hadashi no Marionetto (裸足のマリオネット; "Barefoot Marionette"))	Shoko Aida	Aida	5:23
9.	"Eien ni..." ((永遠に…; "Eternally..."))	Sachiko Suzuki (as Miyoko A.)	Masaya Ozeki	4:56
10.	"Tokubetsu na Ichinichi" ((特別な一日; "A Special Day"))	Kyōko Endō	Endō	7:53
Total length:				49:19

== Charts ==
Chart (1994)	Peak position
Japanese Albums (Oricon)	58
