= Overture! =

Studio album by Wink
- Released: July 1, 1994
- Recorded: 1993–1994
- Genre: J-pop
- Length: 43:46
- Language: Japanese
- Label: Polystar
- Producer: Haruo Mizuhashi

Wink chronology
Diary (1994)	Overture! (1994)	Voce (1994)

Singles from Overture!
- 1. "Itsumademo Suki de Itakute" Released: February 23, 1994; 2. "Twinkle Twinkle" Released: May 25, 1994

Overture! (オーバーチュア, Ōbāchua) is the 12th studio album by Japanese idol duo Wink, released by Polystar on July 1, 1994. It features the singles "Itsumademo Suki de Itakute" and "Twinkle Twinkle". This is the duo's first album to not include a cover song. In addition, Overture! marks a change in musical direction from dance-pop to a 1960s-style pop sound.

The album peaked at No. 34 on Oricon's albums chart and sold over 23,000 copies.

== Track listing ==
No.	Title	Lyrics	Music	Arrangement	Length
1.	"Que Sera C'est la vie" (Ke Sera Seravi (ケ・セラ・セラヴィ))	Rui Serizawa	Masamichi Sugi	Brett Raymond	4:00
2.	"Mukashi Mitai" ((昔みたい; "Like the Old Days"))	Serizawa	Yuki Kadokura	Raymond	4:10
3.	"You're My Rainy Day"	Serizawa	Yūto Kazato	Raymond	4:26
4.	"Twinkle Twinkle [60's Version]" (Tuinkuru Tuinkuru (トゥインクル トゥインクル))	Yasushi Akimoto	James Shimoji	Y. Kadokura	4:38
5.	"Itsumademo Suki de Itakute" ((いつまでも好きでいたくて; "I Want to Love You Forever"))	Akimoto	Kazuhiko Katō	Satoshi Kadokura	4:42
6.	"Omoide no Mikata" ((思い出の味方; "Ally of Memories"))	Akimoto	Kazuo Zaitsu	Raymond	4:07
7.	"Heishi no Kyūjitsu" ((兵士の休日; "A Soldier's Holiday"))	Shoko Aida	Aida	Y. Kadokura	5:13
8.	"Tasty [Acoustic Version]"	Serizawa	Hideo Saitō	Saitō	3:45
9.	"Days"	Sachiko Suzuki	Tsutomu Ōhira	Raymond	4:29
10.	"Twinkle Twinkle [Original Version]"	Akimoto	Shimoji	Y. Kadokura	4:16
Total length:					43:46

2018 bonus tracks
No.	Title	Lyrics	Music	Arrangement	Length
11.	"Tasty" (Single Version)	Serizawa	Saitō	Saitō	3:45
12.	"Ai wo Ubatte Kokoro Shibatte" ((愛を奪って心縛って; "Take Away Love and Bind Your Heart"))	Yumi Yoshimoto	Daisuke Inoue	S. Kadokura	4:29
Total length:					8:14

== Charts ==
Chart (1994)	Peak position
Japanese Albums (Oricon)	34

== Reception ==
The album was reviewed by CDJournal.
