= Flyin' High (Wink album) =

Studio album by Wink
- Released: July 5, 1995
- Recorded: 1994–1995
- Genre: J-pop; dance-pop; R&B
- Length: 51:24
- Language: Japanese
- Label: Polystar
- Producer: Haruo Mizuhashi

Wink chronology
Back to Front (1995)	Flyin' High (1995)	Wink Remixes (1995)

Singles from Flyin' High
- 1. "Watashitachi Rashii Rule" Released: March 1, 1995; 2. "Jive Into the Night (Yaban na Yoru ni) [Hyper Euro Mix]" Released: March 1, 1995

Flyin' High (フライン・ハイ, Furain Hai) is the 14th studio album by Japanese idol duo Wink, released by Polystar on July 5, 1995. It features the singles "Watashitachi Rashii Rule" and "Jive Into the Night (Yaban na Yoru ni) [Hyper Euro Mix]". Also included in the album are Japanese-language covers of Chuck Wild's "One Kiss at a Time", Chaka Khan's "Ain't Nobody", and Tasha's "My Turn". Flyin' High saw the duo abandon the retro pop sound from their two previous albums and return to their dance pop roots. It was also the first album since Aphrodite to feature songs by songwriter Neko Oikawa. The album became the duo's final studio release before disbanding in 1996 as a result of declining popularity and record sales.

The album peaked at No. 68 on Oricon's albums chart and sold over 10,000 copies.

== Track listing ==
No.	Title	Lyrics	Music	Arrangement	Length
1.	"Heaven ga Matteru (Note: Cover of Chuck Wild's "One Kiss at a Time".)" ((Heavenが待ってる, "Heaven Is Waiting"))	Rui Serizawa	Chuck Wild	Satoshi Kadokura	5:06
2.	"Atteru" ((あってる, "Correct"))	Kanata Asamizu	Masahito Nakano	GEWDA（MASAandHit'C）	4:44
3.	"Jive Into the Night (Yaban na Yoru ni) [House Mix]" ((JIVE INTO THE NIGHT 〜野蛮な夜に〜 [HOUSE MIX], "Jive Into the Night ~Savage Night~"))	Neko Oikawa	Sergio Portaluri; David Sion; Fulvio Zafret	GEWDA（MASAandHit'C）	4:42
4.	"Eien no Koibito (Ain't Nobody)" ((永遠の恋人 〜AIN'T NOBODY〜, "Eternal Lover ~Ain't Nobody~"))	Oikawa	David Wolinski	Keiji Tanabe	4:32
5.	"Kanashimi Yori mo Shitataka ni (My Turn)" ((悲しみよりもしたたかに 〜MY TURN〜, "More Than Sadness ~My Turn~"))	Oikawa	Jan Anna August Leyers; Werner Pensaert	Teddy & Melvin	4:32
6.	"Watashi no Natsu ga Hajimaru" ((私の夏が始まる, "My Summer Begins"))	Serizawa	Masaya Ozeki	Otohiko Tahara	4:44
7.	"Umi ni Kagayaite" ((海に輝いて, "Shining in the Sea"))	Shoko Aida	Aida	Taku Iwasaki	5:22
8.	"Koi no Junan ni Yōkoso" ((恋の受難にようこそ, "Welcome to the Suffering of Love"))	Oikawa	Ozeki	Motoki Funayama	4:36
9.	"Kore ga Koi to Yobenakute mo" ((これが恋と呼べなくても, "Even If This Can't Be Called Love"))	Serizawa	Osny S. Melo	Kadokura	4:47
10.	"Watashitachi Rashii Rule" (Watashitachi Rashī Rūru (私たちらしいルール, "Our Own Rules"))	Yasushi Akimoto	Masamichi Sugi	Kadokura	4:13
11.	"Jive Into the Night (Yaban na Yoru ni) [Hyper Euro Mix]" ((JIVE INTO THE NIGHT 〜野蛮な夜に〜 [HYPER EURO MIX], "Jive Into the Night ~Savage Night~"))	Oikawa	Portaluri; Sion; Zafret	MST	4:06
Total length:					51:24

2018 bonus tracks
No.	Title	Lyrics	Music	Arrangement	Length
12.	"Angel Love Story (Akiiro no Tenshi)" ((Angel Love Story 〜秋色の天使〜, "Angel Love Story ~Autumn Colored Angel~"))	Hiroshi Yamada; Katsuo Hana	Masahiro Ikumi	Ikumi	4:54
13.	"Angel Love Story (Akiiro no Tenshi) [Trance Mix]" ((Angel Love Story 〜秋色の天使〜 [Trance Mix]))	Yamada; Hana	Ikumi	D-RAM	4:28
Total length:					9:22

== Charts ==
Chart (1995)	Peak position
Japanese Albums (Oricon)	68
