= Back to Front =

Back to Front may refer to:

- Back to Front (Gilbert O'Sullivan album), 1972
- Back to Front (Caravan album), 1982
- Back to Front (Lionel Richie album), 1992
- Back to Front (The Temptations album), 2007
- Back to Front (Viktor Lazlo album), 1996
- Back to Front (Wink album), 1995
- Back to Front: Live in London, a 2014 Peter Gabriel concert film and album

== See also ==
- "Front Back", a song by T.I.
