= Sapphire (Wink album) =

Studio album by Wink
- Released: November 25, 1991
- Recorded: 1991
- Genre: J-pop; dance-pop
- Length: 46:30
- Language: Japanese
- Label: Polystar
- Producer: Haruo Mizuhashi

Wink chronology
Queen of Love (1991)	Sapphire (1991)	Diamond Box (1991)

Singles from Sapphire
- 1. "Haitoku no Scenario" Released: October 16, 1991

Sapphire (サファイア, Safaia) is the seventh studio album by Japanese idol duo Wink, released by Polystar on November 25, 1991. It features the single "Haitoku no Scenario". Also included in the album are Japanese-language covers of Kylie Minogue's "Step Back in Time", Cathy Dennis' "Touch Me (All Night Long)", and Bobby Freeman's "Do You Want to Dance".

The album peaked at No. 7 on Oricon's albums chart and sold over 63,000 copies.

== Track listing ==
All music is arranged by Satoshi Kadokura.

No.	Title	Lyrics	Music	Length
1.	"Ano Yoru e Kaeritai (Step Back in Time)" ((あの夜へ帰りたい 〜Step Back In Time〜; "I Want to Go Back to That Night ~Step Back in Time~"))	Hiroko Ezaki	Mike Stock; Matt Aitken; Pete Waterman	4:35
2.	"Big Game"	Rui Serizawa	Masaya Ozeki	4:03
3.	"Yamiyo no Tōbōsha (All Night Long)" ((闇夜の逃亡者 〜All Night Long〜; "Dark Night Escapee ~All Night Long~"))	Neko Oikawa	Greg Carmichael; Patrick Adams	4:15
4.	"Seinaru Yoru ni Kaerenai" ((聖なる夜に帰れない; "I Can't Go Back to the Holy Night"))	Sayako Morimoto	Junko Hirotani	4:56
5.	"Seikimatsu mo heiki (Do You Wanna Dance)" ((世紀末も平気 〜Do You Wanna Dance〜; "No Problem at the End of the Century ~Do You Wanna Dance~"))	Morimoto	Bobby Freeman	4:23
6.	"Honno Chīsana Yūki" ((ほんの小さな勇気; "Just a Little Courage"))	Sachiko Suzuki (as Miyoko A.)	Ozeki	5:03
7.	"Get My Love"	Serizawa	KE-Y	4:53
8.	"Jūnigatsu no Orihime" ((12月の織姫; "Orihime in December"))	Oikawa	Billie Hughes; Roxanne Seeman	4:48
9.	"Tears"	Oikawa	Keiko	5:09
10.	"Haitoku no Scenario" (Haitoku no Shinario (背徳のシナリオ; "An Immoral Scenario"))	Oikawa	Takashi Kudō	4:25
Total length:				46:30

== Charts ==
Chart (1991)	Peak position
Japanese Albums (Oricon)	7
