= Moonlight Serenade (disambiguation) =

"Moonlight Serenade" is a 1939 American popular song with original music by Glenn Miller and subsequent lyrics by Mitchell Parish.

Moonlight Serenade may also refer to:

- Moonlight Serenade (1967 film), Hong Kong film by Shaw Brothers Studios
- Moonlight Serenade (1997 film), Japanese film
- Moonlight Serenade (2009 film), American film
- Moonlight Serenade (Carly Simon album), 2005
- Moonlight Serenade (Wink album), 1988
