= Especially for You: Yasashisa ni Tsutsumarete =

Studio album by Wink
- Released: June 30, 1989
- Recorded: 1988–1989
- Genre: J-pop; dance-pop
- Length: 39:50
- Language: Japanese
- Label: Polystar
- Producer: Haruo Mizuhashi

Wink chronology
At Heel Diamonds (1988)	Especially for You: Yasashisa ni Tsutsumarete (1989)	Twin Memories (1989)

Singles from Especially for You: Yasashisa ni Tsutsumarete
- 1. "Namida wo Misenai de (Boys Don't Cry)" Released: March 16, 1989

Especially for You: Yasashisa ni Tsutsumarete (Especially For You 〜優しさにつつまれて〜; Especially for You: Surrounded by Kindness) is the second studio album by Japanese idol duo Wink, released by Polystar on June 30, 1989. It features the No. 1 single "Namida wo Misenai de (Boys Don't Cry)", a Japanese-language cover of Moulin Rouge's "Boys Don't Cry". Also included in the album are covers of Kylie Minogue and Jason Donovan's "Especially for You", Holly Knight's "Baby Me", Blondie's "Heart of Glass", The Dooleys' "Body Language", Annica Burman's "För Fulla Segel", Connie Francis' "I'm Gonna Be Warm This Winter", Debbie Harry's "You Got Me in Trouble", and The Nolans' "Let's Make Love".

The album hit No. 1 on Oricon's albums chart and sold over 508,000 copies. It was also certified Platinum by the RIAJ.

== Track listing ==
All lyrics are written by Neko Oikawa, except where indicated; all music is arranged by Motoki Funayama, except where indicated.

Side A
No.	Title	Lyrics	Music	Arrangement	Length
1.	"Especially for You: Yasashisa ni Tsutsumarete" ((Especially For You 〜優しさにつつまれて〜; "Especially for You: Surrounded by Kindness"))		Mike Stock; Matt Aitken; Pete Waterman		4:09
2.	"Baby Me"		Holly Knight; Billy Steinberg	Takao Sugiyama	3:45
3.	"Garasu no Kokoro (Heart of Glass)" ((硝子の心 ~Heart Of Glass~))	Yukinojo Mori	Debbie Harry; Chris Stein		4:02
4.	"Only Lonely (Note: Cover of The Dooleys' "Body Language".)"		Ben Findon; Michael Myers; Robert Puzey		4:37
5.	"Take Me to Heaven (Note: Cover of Annica Burman's "För Fulla Segel".)"		Bruno Glenmark; Marcus Ingman		3:37

Side B
No.	Title	Lyrics	Music	Arrangement	Length
1.	"Oshare Dorobō" ((おしゃれ泥棒; "Fashionable Thief"))	Sayako Morimoto	Hank Hunter; Mark Barkan	Kei Wakakusa	3:05
2.	"Remember Sweet"		Kazuya Amikura	Shingo Kobayashi	4:20
3.	"Hikitomenai de (Note: Cover of Debbie Harry's "You Got Me in Trouble".)" ((ひきとめないで; "Don't Hold Back"))	Morimoto	Harry; Seth Justman	Sugiyama	4:23
4.	"Yasashiku Aishite... (Note: Cover of the Nolans' "Let's Make Love".)" ((優しく愛して…; "I Love You Kindly..."))	Mori	Findon; Myers	Wakakusa	4:10
5.	"Namida wo Misenai de (Boys Don't Cry)" ((涙をみせないで～Boys Don't Cry～; "Don't Show Your Tears"))		Matjaž Kosi		3:42

== Charts ==
Chart (1989)	Peak position
Japanese Albums (Oricon)	1

== Certification ==
Region	Certification	Certified units/sales
Japan (RIAJ)	Platinum	400,000^{^}
^{^} Shipments figures based on certification alone.

== See also ==
- 1989 in Japanese music
