= At Heel Diamonds =

EP by Wink
- Released: December 1, 1988
- Recorded: 1988
- Genre: J-pop; dance-pop
- Length: 25:56
- Language: Japanese
- Label: Polystar
- Producer: Haruo Mizuhashi

Wink chronology
Moonlight Serenade (1988)	At Heel Diamonds (1988)	Especially for You: Yasashisa ni Tsutsumarete (1989)

Singles from At Heel Diamonds
- 1. "Ai ga Tomaranai (Turn It into Love)" Released: November 16, 1988

At Heel Diamonds (アット・ヒール・ダイアモンズ, Atto Hīru Daiamonzu) is an EP by Japanese idol duo Wink, released by Polystar on December 1, 1988. It features the duo's first No. 1 single "Ai ga Tomaranai (Turn It into Love)", a Japanese-language cover of Kylie Minogue's "Turn It into Love". Also included in the EP are covers of Bananarama's "Love in the First Degree" and Sinitta's "Cross My Broken Heart", as well as a remix of the duo's debut single "Sugar Baby Love". The EP was the duo's first release to feature songwriter Neko Oikawa and arranger Motoki Funayama, who would work on the duo's further recordings.

The EP peaked at No. 6 on Oricon's albums chart and sold over 345,000 copies.

== Track listing ==
All lyrics are written by Neko Oikawa, except where indicated.

No.	Title	Lyrics	Music	Arrangement	Length
1.	"Ai ga Tomaranai (Turn It into Love)" ((愛が止まらない 〜TURN IT INTO LOVE〜; "Love Doesn't Stop ~Turn It into Love~"))		Mike Stock; Matt Aitken; Pete Waterman	Motoki Funayama	3:29
2.	"Love in the First Degree (Warui Anata)" ((LOVE IN THE FIRST DEGREE 〜悪いあなた〜; "Love in the First Degree ~You Are Bad~"))		Stock; Aitken; Waterman; Sara Dallin; Siobhan Fahey; Keren Woodward	Funayama	4:02
3.	"Cross My Broken Heart (Yasashii Koro wo Odoritai)" ((CROSS MY BROKEN HEART 〜優しい頃を踊りたい〜; "Cross My Broken Heart (I Want to Dance When I'm Kind)"))		Stock; Aitken; Waterman	Kei Wakakusa	3:54
4.	"Ai ga Tomaranai (Turn It into Love) [Remix Version]"		Stock; Aitken; Waterman	Funayama	5:01
5.	"Sugar Baby Love [Remix Version]"	Joe Lemon	Wayne Bickerton; Tony Waddington	Shirō Sagisu	4:32
6.	"Fuyu no Photograph" (Fuyu no Fotogurafu (冬のフォトグラフ; "Winter Photograph"))	Yukinojo Mori	Yasuhiro Kido	Wakakusa	4:58
Total length:					25:56

2018 bonus track
No.	Title	Music	Arrangement	Length
7.	"Ding Ding: Koi kara Hajimaru Futari no Train" (Din Din ~Koi kara Hajimaru Futari no Torein~ (DING DING 〜恋から始まるふたりのトレイン〜; "Ding Ding ~Two Trains Starting from Love~"))	Lasse Andersson; Bruno Glenmark	Funayama	2:59

== Charts ==
Chart (1988)	Peak position
Japanese Albums (Oricon)	6

== See also ==
- 1988 in Japanese music
