= Mobile Suit Gundam 0080: War in the Pocket =

Japanese OVA series

- Cover of the first DVD volume

機動戦士ガンダム0080 ポケットの中の戦争 (Kidō Senshi Gandamu 0080 Poketto no Naka no Sensō)
- Genre: Military science fiction, action, drama
- Created by: Hajime Yatate; Yoshiyuki Tomino
- Original video animation
- Directed by: Fumihiko Takayama
- Produced by: Kenji Uchida; Minoru Takanashi
- Written by: Hiroyuki Yamaga (screenplay); Kyosuke Yuki (scenario)
- Music by: Tetsurō Kashibuchi
- Studio: Sunrise
- Licensed by: NA: Sunrise/Right Stuf
- Released: March 25, 1989 – August 25, 1989
- Episodes: 6
- Manga
- Written by: Shigeto Ikehara
- Published by: Kodansha
- Magazine: Comic BomBom
- Original run: April 1989 – August 1989
- Manga
- Written by: Hiroyuki Tamakoshi
- Published by: Kadokawa Shoten
- Magazine: Gundam Ace
- Original run: June 26, 2021 – present
- icon

Mobile Suit Gundam 0080: War in the Pocket (Japanese: 機動戦士ガンダム0080 ポケットの中の戦争, Hepburn: Kidō Senshi Gandamu 0080 Poketto no Naka no Sensō) is a six-episode 1989 Japanese science fiction original video animation (OVA) series. It is the first OVA series in the Gundam franchise. It was directed by Fumihiko Takayama and written by Hiroyuki Yamaga with character designs by Haruhiko Mikimoto.

As suggested by its subtitle, "War in the Pocket", it is a small, personal story; a side story focusing on the experiences of an eleven-year-old boy during the One Year War and his learning of the real meaning of war. A significant departure for the Gundam franchise at the time, Gundam 0080 has received wide acclaim from critics.

== Plot ==
Mobile Suit Gundam 0080: War in the Pocket is a side story to the main Gundam franchise continuity. The Gundam series is set in a fictional calendar era known as "Universal Century" and it establishes that there is a so-called the "One Year War" between the Earth Federation and Principality of Zeon—the setting for the original series—and War in the Pocket is set in the last days of the war.

In Universal Century 0079, Zeon intelligence has identified a prototype Federation Gundam under development in a Federation base in the Arctic. Elite Zeon MS commandos are dispatched to destroy the prototype, but before they can accomplish their mission the Gundam is launched into space. When the Gundam turns up in a Federation R&D base inside the neutral space colony Side 6, the Principality launches a covert operation to destroy the Gundam utilizing the commando team initially dispatched to assault the Arctic base, including young rookie Bernard "Bernie" Wiseman. However, the raid fails and the entire team is killed except for Bernie.

After crashing his mobile suit, Bernie manages to befriend Alfred "Al" Izuruha, an elementary school boy enamored with a romantic vision of warfare and excited by Bernie's status as a mobile suit pilot regardless of his allegiance, and Al's neighbor Christina "Chris" Mackenzie, secretly the Gundam test pilot. As Bernie tries to repair his damaged mobile suit while hiding out within the station, he develops a close friendship with Al and slowly becomes infatuated with Chris, both pilots remaining unaware of each other's true natures.

As time passes, Bernie discovers that Zeon will destroy Side 6 with a nuclear weapon if he cannot destroy the prototype Gundam. Feeling that he has no choice if the station is to be saved, Bernie takes his mobile suit and goes to engage the Gundam. Believing Side 6 to be under Zeon attack, Chris is ordered to pilot the Gundam in the station's defense, and she and Bernie engage in a destructive battle within the station. Al discovers that the Zeon ship carrying the nuclear weapons was captured, meaning Bernie has no more reason to fight. Alfred tries to stop Bernard, only to see Bernie's mobile suit destroyed and an injured Christina pulled from the heavily damaged Gundam, leaving Al horrified & traumatized.

Afterward, Chris tells Al that she will be leaving Side 6, and asks Alfred to say goodbye to Bernard for her, still unaware that she had killed him. Al does not have the heart to tell her the truth and agrees to her request. The series closes with Al's school holding an assembly in which the principal talks about the effects of war. Al, remembering his time with Bernie, begins to weep uncontrollably during the speech. Al's friends, misunderstanding his grief, try to reassure him that another "cool" war is bound to happen soon.

== Voice cast ==
Characters	Japanese	English
Alfred "Al" Izuruha (アルフレッド・イズルハ, Arufureddo Izuruha)	Daisuke Namikawa	Ian Hawk
Bernard "Bernie" Wiseman (バーナード・ワイズマン, Bānādo Waizuman)	Kōji Tsujitani	David Hayter
Christina "Chris" Mackenzie (クリスチーナ・マッケンジー, Kurisuchīna Makkenjī)	Megumi Hayashibara	Wendee Lee
Telcott (テルコット, Terukotto)	Ken Suzuki	
Chay (チェイ, Chei)	Tomoko Maruo	
Dorothy (ドロシー, Doroshī)	Konami Yoshida	
Hardie Steiner (ハーディ・シュタイナー, Hādi Shutainā)	Yōsuke Akimoto	Barry Stigler
Gabriel Ramirez Garcia (ガブリエル・ラミレス・ガルシア, Gaburieru Ramiresu Garushia)	Bin Shimada	
Mikhail "Misha" Kaminsky (ミハイル・カミンスキー, Mihairu Kaminsukī)	Yuu Shimaka	Paul St. Peter
Charlie (チャーリー, Chārī)	Inaba Minoru	
Dick Lumnba (ディック・ルムンバ, Dikku Rumunba)	Hiroshi Masuoka	
Al's mother (アルの母, Aru no Haha)	Ai Orikasa	

== Production and release ==
Mobile Suit Gundam 0080: War in the Pocket was produced by animation studio Sunrise in association with toy company Bandai. Kenji Uchida was the former representative and Minoru Takanashi was the latter's producer. The series was created to commemorate the tenth anniversary of the Gundam franchise, created by Yoshiyuki Tomino in 1979. War in the Pocket was directed by Fumihiko Takayama, known for his work on Orguss 02 and WXIII: Patlabor the Movie 3, marking the first time anyone other than Tomino directed a Gundam show. The screenplay was written by Hiroyuki Yamaga, with scenario by Kyosuke Yuki, while the character designer for this series was Haruhiko Mikimoto.

War in the Pocket was originally released in Japan in VHS and LaserDisc as a six-part original video animation series between March 25, 1989, and August 25, 1989. Bandai Visual re-released the series three times; first, into two three-episode DVD volumes on December 18, 1999; then, as a DVD box set on April 22, 2011, as part of the "specially priced" DVD series "G-Selection"; and later on a Blu-ray Disc box set on August 29, 2017.

The first North American home media release of War in the Pocket was handled by Bandai Entertainment with dubbing produced by Animaze. First announced in 1998, Bandai originally released it in a VHS box set along with Mobile Suit Gundam 0083: Stardust Memory on March 9, 1999. From September 14, 1999, to November 23, 1999, the company released it into three two-episode VHS volumes, followed by a six-episode box set on December 7, 1999. In December 2000, Bandai announced its DVD release for the following year, but in 2001 Bandai changed the October 2001 release date, to January 2002 and then February 2002. War in the Pocket was released in two DVD volumes between February 19, 2002, and April 23, 2002. Two "complete collection" re-releases followed; a collector's edition box set was published on July 12, 2005, followed by a DVD under "Anime Legends" imprint on March 23, 2009.

Bandai initially planned to broadcast War in the Pocket in the United States in 2002, but Sunrise set a September 2001 airdate. Ultimately, the anime aired on Cartoon Network's Toonami Midnight Run block, starting from November 5, 2001. It was also aired by the same channel on its Adult Swim block on Saturday nights, from November 16, 2002, until December 28, 2002 (after which the Saturday block was removed), and then on "Saturday Video Entertainment System" block, starting from March 1, 2003, and ending on April 19, 2003. Following the 2012 closure of Bandai Entertainment, the company discontinued their home video distribution. In July 2016, Right Stuf announced it would release the anime on DVD in late 2016 in partnership with Sunrise. Next month, it was delayed to early 2017; Right Stuf and Sunrise released it on January 3, 2017.

No.	Title	Original release date	English air date
1	"How Many Miles to the Battlefield?"; Transliteration: "Senjō Made wa Nan Mairu?" (Japanese: 戦場までは何マイル?)	March 25, 1989	November 5, 2001
2	"Reflections in a Brown Eye"; Transliteration: "Chairo no Hitomi ni Utsuru Mono" (Japanese: 茶色の瞳に映るもの)	April 25, 1989	November 6, 2001
3	"And at the End of the Rainbow?"; Transliteration: "Niji no Hate ni wa?" (Japanese: 虹の果てには?)	May 25, 1989	November 7, 2001
4	"Over the River and Through the Woods"; Transliteration: "Kawa wo Watatte Kodachi wo Nukete" (Japanese: 河を渡って木立を抜けて)	June 25, 1989	November 9, 2001
5	"Say it Ain't So, Bernie!"; Transliteration: "Uso Dato Itte yo, Bānī" (Japanese: 嘘だと言ってよ、バーニィ)	July 25, 1989	November 12, 2001
6	"War in the Pocket"; Transliteration: "Poketto no Naka no Sensō" (Japanese: ポケットの中の戦争)	August 25, 1989	November 13, 2001

== Related media ==
=== Print media ===
A large amount of printed fiction related to War in the Pocket has been produced. A gamebook, written by Yūtarō Mochizuki and illustrated by Studio Hard, was released by Bandai on March 20, 1989. A novel based on the anime, The Dreams Chris Sees (クリスが見る夢, Kurisu ga Mieru Yume), written by Hiroyuki Yamaga and illustrated by Haruhiko Mikimoto and Toshiyuki Kubooka, was published as a bonus item for the April 1989 issue of Tokuma Shoten's Animage magazine. Shigeto Ikehara created a manga version serialized in Kodansha's Comic BomBom between its April 1989 and August 1989 issues. Kodansha first released it in tankōbon format on July 17, 1989, and republished it on August 18, 2003, under the "Platinum Comics" imprint, and on November 6, 2006, under the "KC Delux" imprint. A "visual comic" adaptation was published in Bandai's magazine B-club in two editions, starting from July 1989. (Note: Both Agency for Cultural Affairs's Media Arts Database and Amazon.co.jp confirm this release date, but they provide different dates for the second volume; the former registers October 1989, while the latter provides a September 1989 release date.) Kyosuke Yuki wrote and Haruhiko Mikimoto illustrated a novelization of the OVA series published by Kadokawa Shoten in October 1989. As part of the MS Saga – Mobile Suit Gundam in Comic anthology, MediaWorks published a manga by Kenji Mizuhara on February 1, 1994. Asahiya Publishing released two "film comics" titled Mobile Suit Gundam 0080 the OVA Movies in June and July 1998. A new manga adaptation by Hiroyuki Tamakoshi began serialization in Kadokawa Shoten's Gundam Ace on June 26, 2021. The series went on hiatus in September 2022 due to Tamakoshi's chemotherapy. He plans to resume the manga in 2023.

=== Soundtrack ===
The musical score for War in the Pocket was composed by Tetsurō Kashibuchi. Two pieces of music performed by Megumi Shiina are used as the series' opening theme, "Reach Out to the Sky Someday" (いつか空に届いて, Itsuka Sora ni Todoite), and the ending theme, "Distant Memory" (遠い記憶, Tooi Kioku). Two soundtrack albums containing the instrumental and vocal music of the OVA were released under the title Sound Sketch I and II by King Records on March 5, 1999. The first is a seventeen-track CD, while the second contains fourteen tracks; most of the vocal songs are performed by Shiina and Megumi Hayashibara. Songs from the show have also been included on some Gundam music compilations, including Gundam Singles History and Gundam Songs 145.

== Reception and legacy ==
=== Critical reception ===
The series has received wide acclaim from critics. Justin Sevakis of Anime News Network called it "one of the most emotionally powerful war stories ever animated." Lauren Orsini of Anime News Network gave it an A rating for the subbed version and a B− for the dubbed version, praising its "powerful message" and stating this "short but weighty emotional tale" is "as human as Gundam gets." Chris Beveridge of The Fandom Post gave it an A− rating, stating that "this show stands the test of time with its story and its animation" and characters "you can connect with", and concluding that it is "Highly recommended." Evan Minto of Otaku USA gave it a "Recommended" rating, calling it "Gundam as it was meant to be" and stating that it's "a short, poignant story of lost innocence in a world torn in two, and effectively makes the case that in war, we are all victims". Ollie Barder of Forbes called it "A Heartbreaking Masterpiece" and "a good introduction to the captivating world of Gundam".

=== Legacy ===
Yoshiyuki Tomino, who was not involved in the show's production, was interviewed for the Newtype magazine April 1989 issue, after the release of the first episode. He praised the director's effort to make the show realistic and focused on things other than Mobile Suit battles. He also commented on two glitches, one being the portrayal of a blue sky in the colony rather than the other side of the cylinder, which is only about 6.4 km away; and the children being out during a wartime alert. Tomino thought that school resuming with combat in such close proximity was unrealistic, when a more sensible response should have been to close the school immediately and guide the children to shelters.

Gundam 0080 marked a significant departure from the constant background theme of Newtypes featured in the Universal Century Gundam universe, since the original Mobile Suit Gundam up until Char's Counterattack. The absence of this theme raised the series' appeal towards audiences without special liking of Gundam and Tomino's work and would continue in many following Gundam stories narrating about ordinary soldiers and people in these conflicts.

Gundam 0080 also began a tradition of retroactive redesigns. Yutaka Izubuchi updated the original Mobile Suit Gundam's mechanical designs and costumes, and since then other creative teams have offered their own take on the classic Gundam props.

Micah Wright ranked War in the Pocket his fifth-favorite animated series in 2002.

Its DVD box re-release in 2011 was the third-best-placed animation on Oricon's ranking of best-selling DVDs in the week of April 18–24, selling 3,739 copies. The 2017 re-release sold 6,352 copies, and ranked third on Oricon's animation Blu-ray Disc chart.

== Notes ==
Preceded by Mobile Suit SD Gundam	Gundam metaseries (production order); 1989	Succeeded by Mobile Suit Gundam F91
Preceded by Mobile Suit Gundam: Requiem for Vengeance; Mobile Suit Gundam Thunderbolt; Mobile Suit Gundam: The 08th MS Team	Gundam Universal Century timeline U.C. 0079-80	Succeeded by Mobile Suit Gundam 0083: Stardust Memory
