= Tsuioku no Heroine =

Single by Japanese idol duo Wink

Single by Wink

from the album Each Side of Screen
- Language: Japanese
- English title: Reminiscent Heroine
- B-side: "Image na Kankei"
- Released: December 16, 1991
- Recorded: 1991
- Genre: J-pop; dance-pop
- Length: 4:22
- Label: Polystar
- Composer: Yuki Kadokura
- Lyricist: Neko Oikawa
- Producer: Haruo Mizuhashi

Wink singles chronology
"Haitoku no Scenario" (1991)	"Tsuioku no Heroine" (1991)	"Matenrō Museum" (1992)

"Tsuioku no Heroine" (追憶のヒロイン, Tsuioku no Hiroin; lit. "Reminiscent Heroine") is the 13th single by Japanese idol duo Wink. Written by Neko Oikawa and Yuki Kadokura, the single was released on December 16, 1991, by Polystar Records.

== Background and release ==
Both "Tsuioku no Heroine" and the B-side "Image na Kankei" were recorded as the ending and opening themes, respectively, of the NTV anime series Watashi to Watashi: Futari no Lotte (わたしとわたし ふたりのロッテ; I and Myself: The Two Lottes).

"Tsuioku no Heroine" peaked at No. 5 on the Oricon's weekly charts and sold over 136,000 copies.

== Track listing ==
All lyrics are written by Neko Oikawa; all music is arranged by Satoshi Kadokura.

No.	Title	Music	Length
1.	"Tsuioku no Heroine" (Tsuioku no Hiroin (追憶のヒロイン; "Reminiscent Heroine"))	Yuki Kadokura	4:22
2.	"Image na Kankei" (Imāju na Kankei (イマージュな関係; "Image Relationship"))	Toshiaki Matsumoto	4:47

== Charts ==
Weekly charts

Chart (1991)	Peak position
Japanese Oricon Singles Chart	5

Year-end charts

Chart (1992)	Position
Japanese Oricon Singles Chart	138
