= Matenrō Museum =

Single by Wink

from the album Each Side of Screen
- Language: Japanese
- English title: Skyscraper Museum
- B-side: "Scarlet no Yakusoku"
- Released: March 25, 1992
- Recorded: 1991
- Genre: J-pop; dance-pop
- Length: 4:16
- Label: Polystar
- Composer: Takashi Kudō
- Lyricist: Neko Oikawa
- Producer: Haruo Mizuhashi

Wink singles chronology
| "Tsuioku no Heroine" (1991) | "Matenrō Museum" (1992) | "Furimukanaide" (1992) |

Music video
- "Matenrō Museum" on YouTube

"Matenrō Museum" (摩天楼ミュージアム, Matenrō Myūjiamu; lit. "Skyscraper Museum") is the 14th single by Japanese idol duo Wink. Written by Neko Oikawa and Takashi Kudō, the single was released on March 25, 1992, by Polystar Records.

== Background and release ==
"Matenrō Museum" was used as the ending theme of the Fuji TV quiz show Quiz! Toshi no Sa Nante (クイズ!年の差なんて, Kuizu! Toshi no Sa Nante; Quiz! A One-Year Difference).

"Matenrō Museum" peaked at No. 4 on the Oricon's weekly charts and sold over 142,000 copies.

== Track listing ==
All lyrics are written by Neko Oikawa; all music is composed by Takashi Kudō; all music is arranged by Satoshi Kadokura.

| No. | Title | Length |
|---|---|---|
| 1. | "Matenrō Museum" (Matenrō Myūjiamu (摩天楼ミュージアム; "Skyscraper Museum")) | 4:16 |
| 2. | "Scarlet no Yakusoku" (Sukāretto no Yakusoku (スカーレットの約束; "Scarlet Promise")) | 4:27 |

== Charts ==
Weekly charts

| Chart (1992) | Peak position |
|---|---|
| Japanese Oricon Singles Chart | 4 |

Year-end charts

| Chart (1992) | Peak position |
|---|---|
| Japanese Oricon Singles Chart | 126 |
