= Watashitachi Rashii Rule =

Single by Wink

from the album Flyin' High
- Language: Japanese
- English title: Our Own Rules
- B-side: "Kore ga Koi to Yobenakute mo"
- Released: March 1, 1995
- Recorded: 1994
- Genre: J-pop
- Length: 4:14
- Label: Polystar
- Composer: Masamichi Sugi
- Lyricist: Yasushi Akimoto
- Producer: Haruo Mizuhashi

Wink singles chronology
"Cherie Mon Cherie" (1994)	"Watashitachi Rashii Rule" (1995)	"Jive Into the Night (Yaban na Yoru ni) [Hyper Euro Mix]" (1995)

"Watashitachi Rashii Rule" (私たちらしいルール, Watashitachi Rashī Rūru; lit. "Our Own Rules") is the 23rd single by Japanese idol duo Wink. Written by Yasushi Akimoto and Masamichi Sugi, the single was released on March 1, 1995, by Polystar Records.

== Background and release ==
"Watashitachi Rashii Rule" was used as the theme song of the TV Asahi drama series Koibito wo Tsukuru Hyaku no Hōhō (恋人をつくる100の方法; 100 Ways to Make a Lover).

"Watashitachi Rashii Rule" peaked at No. 46 on the Oricon's weekly charts and sold over 16,000 copies.

== Track listing ==
All music is arranged by Satoshi Kadokura.

No.	Title	Lyrics	Music	Length
1.	"Watashitachi Rashii Rule" (Watashitachi Rashī Rūru (私たちらしいルール; "Our Own Rules"))	Yasushi Akimoto	Masamichi Sugi	4:14
2.	"Kore ga Koi to Yobenakute mo" ((これが恋と呼べなくても; "Even If This Can't Be Called Love"))	Rui Serizawa	Osny S. Melo	4:46
3.	"Watashitachi Rashii Rule" (Original Karaoke)			4:14
4.	"Kore ga Koi to Yobenakute mo" (Original Karaoke)			4:42

== Chart positions ==
Weekly charts

Chart (1995)	Peak position
Japanese Oricon Singles Chart	46

Year-end charts

Chart (1995)	Peak position
Japanese Oricon Singles Chart	546
