= Queen of Love =

Studio album by Wink
- Released: July 10, 1991
- Recorded: 1990–1991
- Genre: J-pop; dance-pop; pop rock
- Length: 45:53
- Language: Japanese
- Label: Polystar
- Producer: Haruo Mizuhashi

Wink chronology
| Crescent (1990) | Queen of Love (1991) | Sapphire (1991) |

Singles from Queen of Love
- 1. "Kitto Atsui Kuchibiru (Remain)" Released: March 20, 1991; 2. "Manatsu no Tremolo" Released: June 19, 1991

Queen of Love (クィーン・オブ・ラブ, Kuīn obu Rabu) is the sixth studio album by Japanese idol duo Wink, released by Polystar on July 10, 1991. It features the singles "Kitto Atsui Kuchibiru (Remain)" and "Manatsu no Tremolo". Also included in the album are Japanese-language covers of The Beach Boys' "Fun, Fun, Fun", Bette Midler's "Night and Day", and Zager and Evans' "In the Year 2525".

The album peaked at No. 6 on Oricon's albums chart and sold over 108,000 copies.

== Track listing ==
All music is arranged by Satoshi Kadokura.

| No. | Title | Lyrics | Music | Length |
|---|---|---|---|---|
| 1. | "Manatsu no Tremolo [Album Version]" (Manatsu no Toremoro (真夏のトレモロ; "Midsummer Tremolo")) | Neko Oikawa | Takashi Kudō | 4:41 |
| 2. | "Omoide ni Good Luck" ((想い出にGood Luck; "Good Luck for Memories")) | Oikawa | Katsuki Ōba | 4:10 |
| 3. | "Mysterious (Manatsu no Yoru no Yume)" ((Mysterious 〜真夏の夜の夢〜; "Mysterious ~A Midsummer Night's Dream~")) | Hiroko Ezaki | Roxanne Seeman; Joe Curiale | 4:14 |
| 4. | "Ichinenmae no Koibito" ((一年前の恋人; "Last Year's Lover")) | Machiko Ryū | Takao Kisugi | 4:49 |
| 5. | "Fun, Fun, Fun" | Oikawa | Brian Wilson; Mike Love | 3:35 |
| 6. | "Awa ni Naru (Endless Summer)" ((泡になる 〜Endless Summer〜; "Become a Bubble ~Endless Summer~")) | Rui Serizawa | Junko Hirotani | 5:24 |
| 7. | "Siesta" (Shiesuta (シエスタ)) | Serizawa | Masaya Ozeki | 4:37 |
| 8. | "Kitto Atsui Kuchibiru (Remain)" (Kitto Atsui Kuchibiru ~Rimein~ (きっと熱いくちびる 〜リメイン〜; "I'm Sure It's Hot (Remain)")) | Oikawa | Anri Sekine | 4:40 |
| 9. | "Yoru no Tsuki, Hiru no Tsuki" ((夜の月、昼の月; "Night Moon, Day Moon")) | Sayako Morimoto | Billie Hughes; Seeman | 5:01 |
| 10. | "Mighty Mighty Love" | Morimoto | Rick Evans | 4:42 |
| Total length: | | | | 45:53 |

2018 bonus tracks
| No. | Title | Lyrics | Music | Length |
|---|---|---|---|---|
| 11. | "Shake It" | Yoshiko Miura | KE-Y | 4:44 |
| 12. | "Kiseki no Monument" (Kiseki no Monyumento (奇跡のモニュメント; "Miraculous Monument")) | Oikawa | Ozeki | 4:09 |
| Total length: | | | | 8:53 |

== Charts ==
| Chart (1991) | Peak position |
|---|---|
| Japanese Albums (Oricon) | 6 |
