= Angel Love Story (Akiiro no Tenshi) =

Single by Japanese idol duo Wink

Single by Wink

from the album Reminiscence
- Language: Japanese
- English title: Angel Love Story (Autumn Colored Angel
- B-side: "Angel Love Story (Akiiro no Tenshi) [Trance Mix]"
- Released: September 15, 1995
- Recorded: 1995
- Genre: J-pop; R&B
- Length: 4:06
- Label: Polystar
- Composer: Masahiro Ikumi
- Lyricists: Hiroshi Yamada; Katsuo Hana
- Producer: Haruo Mizuhashi

Wink singles chronology
"Jive Into the Night (Yaban na Yoru ni) [Hyper Euro Mix]" (1995)	"Angel Love Story (Akiiro no Tenshi)" (1995)	"Special to Me" (2018)

Music video
- "Angel Love Story (Akiiro no Tenshi)" on YouTube

"Angel Love Story (Akiiro no Tenshi)" (Angel Love Story 〜秋色の天使〜; lit. "Angel Love Story ~Autumn Colored Angel") is the 25th single by Japanese idol duo Wink. Written by Hiroshi Yamada, Katsuo Hana, and Masahiro Ikumi, the single was released on September 15, 1995, by Polystar Records. It was the duo's final single before they disbanded in 1996.

== Background and release ==
"Angel Love Story (Akiiro no Tenshi)" was used by Triumph International for their Angel Bra commercial.

The single peaked at No. 62 on the Oricon's weekly charts and sold over 8,000 copies.

== Track listing ==
No.	Title	Lyrics	Music	Arrangement	Length
1.	"Angel Love Story (Akiiro no Tenshi)" ((Angel Love Story 〜秋色の天使〜; "Angel Love Story ~Autumn Colored Angel~"))	Hiroshi Yamada; Katsuo Hana	Masahiro Ikumi	Ikumi	4:54
2.	"Angel Love Story (Akiiro no Tenshi) [Trance Mix]" ((Angel Love Story 〜秋色の天使〜 [Trance Mix]))	Yamada; Hana	Ikumi	D-RAM
3.	"Angel Love Story (Akiiro no Tenshi)" (Original Karaoke)
4.	"Angel Love Story (Akiiro no Tenshi) [Trance Mix]" (Original Karaoke)

== Chart positions ==
Weekly charts

Chart (1995)	Peak position
Japanese Oricon Singles Chart	62

Year-end charts

Chart (1995)	Peak position
Japanese Oricon Singles Chart	677
