= Each Side of Screen =

Studio album by Wink
- Released: April 25, 1992
- Recorded: 1991–1992
- Genre: J-pop; dance-pop
- Length: 44:48
- Language: Japanese
- Label: Polystar
- Producer: Haruo Mizuhashi

Wink chronology
Diamond Box (1991)	Each Side of Screen (1992)	Nocturne (Yasōkyoku) (1992)

Singles from Each Side of Screen
- 1. "Tsuioku no Heroine / Image na Kankei" Released: December 16, 1991; 2. "Matenrō Museum" Released: March 25, 1992

Each Side of Screen (イーチ・サイド・オブ・スクリーン, Īchi Saido obu Sukurīn) is the eighth studio album by Japanese idol duo Wink, released by Polystar on April 25, 1992. It features the singles "Tsuioku no Heroine" and "Matenrō Museum". Also included in the album are Japanese-language covers of Hot Chocolate's "Brother Louie", Meisler's "We Can Make It", Billie Hughes' "Love Is an Art", Roxanne's "Burning Through the Night", and KC and the Sunshine Band's "That's the Way (I Like It)".

The album peaked at No. 11 on Oricon's albums chart and sold over 58,000 copies.

== Track listing ==
All lyrics are written by Neko Oikawa, except where indicated; all music is arranged by Satoshi Kadokura, except where indicated.

No.	Title	Lyrics	Music	Arrangement	Length
1.	"Frou-Frou"		Errol Brown; Tony Wilson		4:07
2.	"Pierce no Shinsō (We Can Make It)" (Piasu no Shinsō ~We Can Make It~ (ピアスの真相 〜We Can Make It〜, "The Truth About Earrings ~We Can Make It~"))		Joey Carbone; Jeff Carruthers	Tomoji Sogawa	4:50
3.	"Matenrō Museum" (Matenrō Myūjiamu (摩天楼ミュージアム, "Skyscraper Museum"))		Takashi Kudō		4:15
4.	"Byakuya" ((白夜, "Midnight Sun"))	Rui Serizawa	Junko Hirotani		4:48
5.	"Like a Bird"		Billie Hughes; Roxanne Seeman; John Keller		4:18
6.	"Mirai made Matenai (Note: Cover of Roxanne's "Burning Through the Night".)" ((未来まで待てない, "I Can't Wait for the Future"))		James C. Brown; John A. Butler		4:13
7.	"Kiri no Rakuen (That's the Way (I Like It))" ((霧の楽園 〜THAT'S THE WAY (I Like It)〜, "Misty Paradise ~That's the Way (I Like It)~"))		Harry Wayne Casey; Richard Finch		5:00
8.	"Ren'ai Gambler" (Ren'ai Gyanburā (恋愛ギャンブラー, "Love Gambler"))		KE-Y	Sogawa	4:25
9.	"Tsuioku no Heroine" (Tsuioku no Hiroin (追憶のヒロイン, "Reminiscent Heroine"))		Yuki Kadokura		4:22
10.	"Tada Natsu ni Koi wo Shita" ((ただ夏に恋をした, "I Just Fell in Love with the Summer"))	Serizawa	Toshiaki Matsumoto	Sogawa	4:30
Total length:					44:48

2018 bonus tracks
No.	Title	Music	Length
11.	"Scarlet no Yakusoku" (Sukāretto no Yakusoku (スカーレットの約束, "Scarlet Promise"))	Kudō	4:29
12.	"Image na Kankei" (Imāju na Kankei (イマージュな関係, "Image Relationship"))	Matsumoto	4:46
Total length:			9:15

== Charts ==
Chart (1992)	Peak position
Japanese Albums (Oricon)	11
