= Back to Front (Wink album) =

Compilation album by Wink
- Released: February 25, 1995
- Recorded: 1988–1994
- Genre: J-pop; dance-pop
- Length: 96:04
- Language: Japanese
- Label: Polystar
- Producer: Haruo Mizuhashi

Wink chronology
Voce (1994)	Back to Front (1995)	Flyin' High (1995)

Back to Front (バック・トゥ・フロント, Bakku tu Furonto) is the fourth compilation album by Japanese idol duo Wink, released by Polystar on February 25, 1995. The two-disc album covers the duo's B-sides from 1988 to 1994.

The album peaked at No. 93 on Oricon's albums chart and sold over 4,000 copies, becoming their lowest-selling album.

== Track listing ==
All lyrics are written by Neko Oikawa, except whee indicated.

Disc 1
No.	Title	Lyrics	Music	Arrangement	Length
1.	"Only Lonely (Note: Cover of the Dooleys' "Body Language".)"		Ben Findon; Michael Myers; Robert Puzey	Motoki Funayama	4:39
2.	"Ichiban Kanashii Bara" ((いちばん哀しい薔薇; "The Saddest Rose"))		Kisaburō Suzuki	Funayama	4:25
3.	"Shake It"	Yoshiko Miura	KE-Y	Satoshi Kadokura	4:46
4.	"Made in Love"	Rui Serizawa	Seishirō Kusunose	Kadokura	4:43
5.	"Jūnigatsu no Orihime (Note: Cover of Zoe Haywood's "My World".)" ((12月の織姫; "Orihime in December"))		Billie Hughes; Roxanne Seeman	Kadokura	4:49
6.	"Image na Kankei" (Imāju na Kankei (イマージュな関係; "Image Relationship"))		Toshiaki Matsumoto	Kadokura	4:48
7.	"Romance no Hakobune (Note: Cover of Dr. Zivago's "Little Russian".)" (Romansu no Hakobune (ロマンスの方舟; "Romance's Ark"))		Setolosi Alessandro Degl'innocenti; Marco Masini	Funayama	3:54
8.	"Kiseki no Monument" (Kiseki no Monyumento (奇跡のモニュメント; "Miraculous Monument"))		Masaya Ozeki	Kadokura	4:11
9.	"Alone Again (Note: Cover of Windham Hill's "Nothing Means More to Me Than You".)"	Serizawa	Jamey Jaz; Ren Toppano; Viqui Denman	Kadokura	4:40
10.	"Kaze no Prelude" (Kaze no Pureryūdo (風の前奏曲（プレリュード）; "Wind Prelude"))	Joe Lemon	Akira Mitake	Shirō Sagisu	4:45
11.	"Ding Ding: Koi kara Hajimaru Futari no Train" (Din Din ~Koi kara Hajimaru Futari no Torein~ (DING DING 〜恋から始まるふたりのトレイン〜; "Ding Ding ~Two Trains Starting from Love~"))		Lasse Andersson; Bruno Glenmark	Funayama	2:59

Disc 2
No.	Title	Lyrics	Music	Arrangement	Length
1.	"Mizu no Seiza (Note: Cover of Tricia Leigh Fisher's "Let an Angel".)" ((水の星座; "Water Constellation"))		Rod Gamons; Angie Rubin; Shelley Speck	Kadokura	4:46
2.	"Cat-Walk Dancing"	Takashi Matsumoto	Hitoshi Haba	Funayama	4:13
3.	"Maboroshi ga Sakenderu" ((幻が叫んでる; "The Illusion Is Screaming"))		Tomofumi Suzuki	Tsukasa Ebisu	4:26
4.	"Mujitsu no Object" (Mujitsu no Obuje (無実のオブジェ; "An Innocent Object"))		Simon Climie; Holly Knight	Takao Sugiyama	4:33
5.	"Omoide made Soba ni Ite (Welcome to the Edge)" ((想い出までそばにいて (Welcome To The Edge); "I'll Stay by Your Side Until You Remember (Welcome to the Edge)"))		Hughes; Seeman; Dominic Messinger	Kadokura	5:05
6.	"Tasty"	Serizawa	Hideo Saitō	Saitō	3:47
7.	"Ai wo Ubatte Kokoro Shibatte" ((愛を奪って心縛って; "Take Away Love and Bind Your Heart"))	Yumi Yoshimoto	Daisuke Inoue	Kadokura	4:29
8.	"Scarlet no Yakusoku" (Sukāretto no Yakusoku (スカーレットの約束; "Scarlet Promise"))		Takashi Kudō	Kadokura	4:29
9.	"Maigo no Lonely Heart" (Maigo no Ronrī Hāto (迷子のロンリー・ハート; "A Lost Child's Lonely Heart"))	Yukinojo Mori	Yasuhiro Kido	Ken Wakakusa	3:52
10.	"Senaka made 500 Miles" (Senaka made Gohyaku Mairu (背中まで500マイル; "500 Miles and Back"))		Hedy West	Funayama	3:41
11.	"Please Please Me"	Chika Ueda	Ueda	Kadokura	4:06

== Charts ==
Chart (1995)	Peak position
Japanese Albums (Oricon)	93
