= Jive Into the Night (Yaban na Yoru ni) =

Single by Wink

from the album Flyin' High
- Language: Japanese
- English title: Jive Into the Night (Savage Night)
- B-side: "Atteru"
- Released: June 25, 1995
- Recorded: 1995
- Genre: J-pop; Eurobeat
- Length: 4:06
- Label: Polystar
- Composers: Sergio Portaluri; David Sion; Fulvio Zafret
- Lyricist: Neko Oikawa
- Producer: Haruo Mizuhashi

Wink singles chronology
"Watashitachi Rashii Rule" (1995)	"Jive Into the Night (Yaban na Yoru ni)" (1995)	"Angel Love Story (Akiiro no Tenshi)" (1995)

Music video
- "Jive Into the Night (Yaban na Yoru ni) [Hyper Euro Mix]" on YouTube

"Jive Into the Night (Yaban na Yoru ni)" (JIVE INTO THE NIGHT 〜野蛮な夜に〜; lit. "Jive Into the Night ~Savage Night~") is the 24th single by Japanese idol duo Wink. Written by Neko Oikawa, Sergio Portaluri, David Sion, and Fulvio Zafret, it is a Japanese-language cover of the 1988 song "Jive Into the Night" by the Italian Eurobeat group The Green Olives. The "Hyper Euro Mix" version was released as a single on June 25, 1995, by Polystar Records.

== Background and release ==
Prior to Wink's version, "Jive Into the Night" was covered in Japanese by the White Tigers in 1988 (as "Motto Fantasy" (もっとFANTASY; "More Fantasy")) and by Masaru Narita & D.K.I. in 1989, each with different lyrics and arrangement. "Jive Into the Night (Yaban na Yoru ni)" was remixed by MST, which consisted of producers Mitsugu Matsumoto, Takahiro Tashiro, and Osamu Marumoto.

"Jive Into the Night (Yaban na Yoru ni) [Hyper Euro Mix]" peaked at No. 92 on the Oricon's weekly charts and sold over 6,000 copies, making it the duo's lowest-charting and lowest-selling single.

== Track listing ==
No.	Title	Lyrics	Music	Arrangement	Length
1.	"Jive Into the Night (Yaban na Yoru ni) [Hyper Euro Mix]" ((JIVE INTO THE NIGHT 〜野蛮な夜に〜; "Jive Into the Night ~Savage Night~"))	Neko Oikawa	Sergio Portaluri; David Sion; Fulvio Zafret	MST	4:06
2.	"Atteru" ((あってる; "Correct"))	Kanata Asamizu	Masahito Nakano	GEWDA
3.	"Jive Into the Night (Yaban na Yoru ni) [Hyper Euro Mix]" (Original Karaoke)
4.	"Atteru" (Original Karaoke)

== Chart positions ==
Weekly charts

Chart (1995)	Peak position
Japanese Oricon Singles Chart	92

Year-end charts

Chart (1995)	Peak position
Japanese Oricon Singles Chart	723
