= Cherie Mon Cherie =

Single by Wink

from the album Voce
- Language: Japanese
- B-side: "Please Please Me"
- Released: October 26, 1994
- Recorded: 1994
- Genre: J-pop
- Length: 4:44
- Label: Polystar
- Composer: Satoshi Kadokura
- Lyricist: Rui Serizawa
- Producer: Haruo Mizuhashi

Wink singles chronology
"Twinkle Twinkle" (1994)	"Cherie Mon Cherie" (1994)	"Watashitachi Rashii Rule" (1995)

Music video
- "Cherie Mon Cherie" on YouTube

"Cherie Mon Cherie" (シェリー モン シェリ, Sherī Mon Sheri) is the 22nd single by Japanese idol duo Wink. Written by Rui Serizawa and Satoshi Kadokura, the single was released on October 26, 1994, by Polystar Records.

== Background and release ==
"Cherie Mon Cherie" was used by Unicharm for its Air Wick commercial featuring Wink.

"Cherie Mon Cherie" peaked at No. 29 on the Oricon's weekly charts and sold over 25,000 copies.

== Track listing ==
All music is arranged by Satoshi Kadokura.

No.	Title	Lyrics	Music	Length
1.	"Cherie Mon Cherie" (Sherī Mon Sheri (シェリー モン シェリ))	Rui Serizawa	Satoshi Kadokura	4:44
2.	"Please Please Me"	Chika Ueda	Ueda	4:07
3.	"Cherie Mon Cherie" (Original Karaoke)			4:43
4.	"Please Please Me" (Original Karaoke)			4:04

== Chart positions ==
Weekly charts

Chart (1994)	Peak position
Japanese Oricon Singles Chart	29

Year-end charts

Chart (1994)	Peak position
Japanese Oricon Singles Chart	460
