= Twinkle Twinkle (Wink song) =

1994 single by Wink

Single by Wink

from the album Overture!
- Language: Japanese
- B-side: "Tasty"
- Released: May 25, 1994
- Recorded: 1994
- Genre: J-pop; dance-pop
- Length: 4:19
- Label: Polystar
- Composer: James Shimoji
- Lyricist: Yasushi Akimoto
- Producer: Haruo Mizuhashi

Wink singles chronology
"Itsumademo Suki de Itakute" (1994)	"Twinkle Twinkle" (1994)	"Cherie Mon Cherie" (1994)

Music video
- "Twinkle Twinkle" on YouTube

"Twinkle Twinkle" (トゥインクル トゥインクル, Tuinkuru Tuinkuru) is the 21st single by Japanese idol duo Wink. Written by Yasushi Akimoto and James Shimoji, the single was released on May 25, 1994, by Polystar Records.

== Background and release ==
"Twinkle Twinkle" was used by Tokyo City Keiba for its "Twinkle Race" commercials. The B-side, "Tasty", was used by Dunkin' Donuts for their commercial featuring Wink.

"Twinkle Twinkle" peaked at No. 28 on the Oricon's weekly charts and sold over 74,000 copies.

== Track listing ==
No.	Title	Lyrics	Music	Arrangement	Length
1.	"Twinkle Twinkle" (Tuinkuru Tuinkuru (トゥインクル トゥインクル))	Yasushi Akimoto	James Shimoji	Yuki Kadokura	4:19
2.	"Tasty"	Rui Serizawa	Hideo Saitō	Saitō	3:47
3.	"Twinkle Twinkle" (Original Karaoke)
4.	"Tasty" (Original Karaoke)

== Chart positions ==
Weekly charts

Chart (1994)	Peak position
Japanese Oricon Singles Chart	28

Year-end charts

Chart (1994)	Peak position
Japanese Oricon Singles Chart	267

== Twinkle Twinkle 2017 ==
"Twinkle Twinkle 2017"

Single by Shoko Aida feat. Oriental Radio
- Language: Japanese
- Released: June 28, 2017
- Recorded: 2017
- Genre: J-pop
- Length: 2:05
- Label: Yoshimoto R and C
- Composer: James Shimoji
- Lyricist: Yasushi Akimoto

Music video
- "Twinkle Twinkle 2017" on YouTube

To promote Tokyo City Keiba's "Twinkle Race 2017", former Wink member Shoko Aida collaborated with the comedy duo Oriental Radio to release a new recording of "Twinkle Twinkle" as a digital single on June 28, 2017. The song features additional rap lyrics by Mitsuhiro Fukada and arrangement by DJ Juvenile. The music video stars fashion model Rola and Oriental Radio.

=== Track listing ===
No.	Title	Lyrics	Music	Arrangement	Length
1.	"Twinkle Twinkle 2017"	Yasushi Akimoto; Mitsuhiro Fukada	James Shimoji	Juvenile	2:05
