= Moonlight Serenade (Wink album) =

Studio album by Wink
- Released: June 1, 1988
- Recorded: 1988
- Genre: J-pop; dance-pop
- Length: 40:52
- Language: Japanese
- Label: Polystar
- Producer: Haruo Mizuhashi

Wink chronology
Moonlight Serenade (1988)	At Heel Diamonds (1988)

Singles from Moonlight Serenade
- 1. "Sugar Baby Love" Released: April 27, 1988

Moonlight Serenade (ムーンライト・セレナーデ, Mūnraito Serenāde) is the debut studio album by Japanese idol duo Wink, released by Polystar on June 1, 1988. It features the duo's debut single, a Japanese-language cover of The Rubettes' "Sugar Baby Love". Also included in the album are covers of Diane Renay's "Navy Blue", The Four Seasons' "Bye, Bye, Baby (Baby Goodbye)", Orleans' "Dance with Me", and Paul Anka's "Put Your Head on My Shoulder".

The album peaked at No. 52 on Oricon's albums chart and sold over 50,000 copies.

== Track listing ==
Side A
No.	Title	Lyrics	Music	Arrangement	Length
1.	"Nagisa Monogatari" ((渚物語; "Beach Story"))	Yukinojo Mori	Yasuhiro Kido	Kei Wakakusa	4:17
2.	"Navy Blue"	Sayako Morimoto	Bob Crewe; Bud Rehak; Eddie Rambeau	Wakakusa	3:28
3.	"Bye Bye Baby"	Ren Takayanagi	Crewe; Bob Gaudio	Wakakusa	3:41
4.	"Kaze no Prelude" (Kaze no Pureryūdo (風の前奏曲（プレリュード）; "Wind Prelude"))	Joe Lemon	Akira Mitake	Shirō Sagisu	4:44
5.	"Dance with Me"	Morimoto	John Hall; Johanna Hall	Sagisu	3:33
Total length:					19:42

Side B
No.	Title	Lyrics	Music	Arrangement	Length
1.	"Suteki ni Happy Birthday" ((素敵にHappy Birthday; "A Nice Happy Birthday"))	Machiko Ryū	Takayuki Baba	Kazuo Ōtani	4:05
2.	"Asayake no Balcony" (Asayake no Barukonī (朝焼けのバルコニー; "Sunrise Balcony"))	Ryū	Mitake	Ōtani	3:55
3.	"Anata no Kata ni Hoho Umete" ((あなたの肩に頬うめて; "Put Your Head on My Shoulder"))	Takayanagi	Paul Anka	Sagisu	4:06
4.	"Sugar Baby Love"	Joe Lemon	Wayne Bickerton; Tony Waddington	Sagisu	3:51
5.	"Jasmine wa Kanashii Kaori" (Jasumin wa Kanashii Kaori (ジャスミンは哀しい香り; "Jasmine Has a Sad Scent"))	Mori	Kido	Wakakusa	5:12
Total length:					21:14

2018 bonus tracks
No.	Title	Lyrics	Music	Arrangement	Length
11.	"Amaryllis" (Amaririsu (アマリリス))	Mori	Ken Satō	Shigeru Suzuki	3:55
12.	"Maigo no Lonely Heart" (Maigo no Ronrī Hāto (迷子のロンリー・ハート; "A Lost Child's Lonely Heart"))	Mori	Kido	Ken Wakakusa	3:51
Total length:					7:47

== Charts ==
Chart (1988)	Peak position
Japanese Albums (Oricon)	52

== See also ==
- 1988 in Japanese music
