= Tetsurō Kashibuchi =

Tetsurō Kashibuchi かしぶち 哲郎
- Born: November 9, 1950; Tochigi Prefecture, Japan
- Died: December 17, 2013 (aged 63)
- Genres: Rock
- Occupations: Drummer, composer, music producer
- Instruments: Drums, vocals
- Years active: 1971–2013
- Formerly of: Hachimitsu Pie, Moonriders
- Website: www.kashibuchi.com

Tetsurō Kashibuchi (かしぶち 哲郎, Kashibuchi Tetsurō; November 9, 1950 – December 17, 2013) was a Japanese musician, composer, and record producer.

== Life ==
After performing first in so-called utagoe coffeehouses, he joined the band Hachimitsu Pie, and when they disbanded, he joined the Moonriders. Together with his Moonrider bandmates Ryōmei Shirai and Hirobumi Suzuki he started a unit called Artport.

In the 1980s, he composed many songs and produced albums for idols, especially for Yukiko Okada.

He died on December 17, 2013, from esophageal cancer.

== Works (selection) ==
=== Albums ===
- Rira no hoteru (1983)
- Kanojo no toki (1985)
- fin meguriai (1993)
- Kashibuchi Tetsuro SONGBOOK (1998)
- Kyo wa ame no hi desu (2002)
- Live Egocentrique (2003)
- Tsukuribanashi (2004)
- Jiyu na merodi – Hachimitsu Pie〜Moonriders (2009)
- LE GRAND (2009)

=== Producer, composer for ===
- Agnes Chan
- Seri Ishikawa
- Rie Nakahara
- Eve
- Yukiko Okada
- Megumi Ōishi
- Akiko Ikuina

=== Soundtracks ===
==== Movies ====
- Koisuru Onnatachi (1986)
- Tsuribaka Nisshi 5 (1992)
- Tsuribaka Nisshi 6 (1993)
- Tsuribaka Nisshi 7 (1994)
- Tsuribaka Nisshi 8 (1996)
- Tsuribaka Nisshi 9 (1997)
- Tsuribaka Nisshi 10 (1998)

==== Anime ====
- Mobile Suit Gundam 0080: War in the Pocket (1989)
- Compiler (1992)

== TV commercials ==
- Nomura Securities（2005）
- Sekisui House（2007）
- Panasonic（2008）

== Books ==
- Rock drum ga tatakechatta（2006）
