= Amaryllis (song) =

Japanese-language song

Single by Wink

from the album Wink Hot Singles
- Language: Japanese
- B-side: "Maigo no Lonely Heart"
- Released: September 7, 1988
- Recorded: 1988
- Genre: J-pop
- Label: Polystar
- Composer: Ken Satō
- Lyricist: Yukinojo Mori
- Producer: Haruo Mizuhashi

Wink singles chronology
"Sugar Baby Love" (1988)	"Amaryllis" (1988)	"Ai ga Tomaranai (Turn It into Love)" (1988)

Music video
- "Amaryllis" on YouTube

Amaryllis (アマリリス, Amaririsu) is the second single by Japanese idol duo Wink. Written by Yukinojo Mori and Ken Satō, the single was released on September 7, 1988, by Polystar Records.

The single peaked at No. 30 on the Oricon's weekly charts and sold over 14,000 copies.

== Track listing ==
All lyrics are written by Yukinojo Mori.

No.	Title	Music	Arrangement	Length
1.	"Amaryllis" (Amaririsu (アマリリス))	Ken Satō	Shigeru Suzuki
2.	"Maigo no Lonely Heart" (Maigo no Ronrī Hāto (迷子のロンリー・ハート; "A Lost Child's Lonely Heart"))	Yasuhiro Kido	Ken Wakakusa

== Charts ==
Chart (1988)	Peak position
Japanese Oricon Singles Chart	30

== See also ==
- 1988 in Japanese music
