= Kekkon Shiyoune =

Single by Wink

from the album Aphrodite
- Language: Japanese
- English title: Let's Get Married
- B-side: "Maboroshi ga Sakenderu"
- Released: May 26, 1993
- Recorded: 1992
- Genre: J-pop; pop rock
- Length: 4:15
- Label: Polystar
- Composer: Satoshi Kadokura
- Lyricist: Chinfa Kan
- Producer: Haruo Mizuhashi

Wink singles chronology
"Eien no Ladydoll (Voyage, voyage)" (1993)	"Kekkon Shiyoune" (1993)	"Sakihokore Itoshisa yo" (1993)

Music video
- "Kekkon Shiyoune" on YouTube

"Kekkon Shiyoune" (結婚しようね; lit. "Let's Get Married") is the 18th single by Japanese idol duo Wink. Written by Chinfa Kan and Satoshi Kadokura, the single was released on May 26, 1993, by Polystar Records.

== Background and release ==
"Kekkon Shiyoune" was used as the second ending theme of the Fuji TV anime series Tsuyoshi Shikkari Shinasai. The B-side, "Maboroshi ga Sakenderu" was used by T&E Soft for commercials promoting the Super Famicom game Sword World SFC.

"Kekkon Shiyoune" peaked at No. 15 on the Oricon's weekly charts and sold over 75,000 copies.

== Track listing ==
No.	Title	Lyrics	Music	Arrangement	Length
1.	"Kekkon Shiyoune" ((結婚しようね; "Let's Get Married"))	Chinfa Kan	Satoshi Kadokura	Kadokura	4:15
2.	"Maboroshi ga Sakenderu" ((幻が叫んでる; "The Illusion Is Screaming"))	Neko Oikawa	Tomofumi Suzuki	Tsukasa Ebisu	4:26
3.	"Kekkon Shiyoune" (Original Karaoke)				4:13

== Chart positions ==
Weekly charts

Chart (1993)	Peak position
Japanese Oricon Singles Chart	15

Year-end charts

Chart (1993)	Peak position
Japanese Oricon Singles Chart	270
