= Kitto Atsui Kuchibiru (Remain) =

Single by Japanese idol duo Wink

Single by Wink

from the album Queen of Love
- Language: Japanese
- English title: I'm Sure It's Hot (Remain)
- B-side: "Kiseki no Monument"
- Released: March 20, 1991
- Recorded: 1990
- Genre: J-pop; dance-pop
- Length: 4:40
- Label: Polystar
- Composer: Anri Sekine
- Lyricist: Neko Oikawa
- Producer: Haruo Mizuhashi

Wink singles chronology
| "New Moon ni Aimashou" (1990) | "Kitto Atsui Kuchibiru (Remain)" (1991) | "Manatsu no Tremolo" (1991) |

Music video
- "Kitto Atsui Kuchibiru (Remain)" on YouTube

"Kitto Atsui Kuchibiru (Remain)" (きっと熱いくちびる 〜リメイン〜, Kitto Atsui Kuchibiru ~Rimein~; lit. "I'm Sure It's Hot (Remain)") is the tenth single by Japanese idol duo Wink. Written by Neko Oikawa and Anri Sekine, the single was released on March 20, 1991, by Polystar Records.

== Background and release ==
According to lyricist Neko Oikawa, she got the idea of the title "Kitto Atsui Kuchibiru (Remain)" from a manga she saw somewhere.

"Kitto Atsui Kuchibiru (Remain)" became Wink's third consecutive single to peak at No. 2 on the Oricon's weekly charts. It sold over 175,000 copies.

== Track listing ==
All lyrics are written by Neko Oikawa; all music is arranged by Satoshi Kadokura.

| No. | Title | Music | Length |
|---|---|---|---|
| 1. | "Kitto Atsui Kuchibiru (Remain)" (Kitto Atsui Kuchibiru ~Rimein~ (きっと熱いくちびる 〜リメイン〜; "I'm Sure It's Hot (Remain)")) | Anri Sekine | 4:40 |
| 2. | "Kiseki no Monument" (Kiseki no Monyumento (奇跡のモニュメント; "Miraculous Monument")) | Masaya Ozeki | 4:08 |

== Charts ==
Weekly charts

| Chart (1991) | Peak position |
|---|---|
| Japanese Oricon Singles Chart | 2 |

Year-end charts

| Chart (1991) | Position |
|---|---|
| Japanese Oricon Singles Chart | 91 |
