= Itsumademo Suki de Itakute =

Single by Wink

from the album Overture!
- Language: Japanese
- English title: I Want to Love You Forever
- B-side: "Ai wo Ubatte Kokoro Shibatte"
- Released: February 23, 1994
- Recorded: 1993
- Genre: J-pop
- Length: 4:43
- Label: Polystar
- Composer: Kazuhiko Katō
- Lyricist: Yasushi Akimoto
- Producer: Haruo Mizuhashi

Wink singles chronology
"Sakihokore Itoshisa yo" (1993)	"Itsumademo Suki de Itakute" (1994)	"Twinkle Twinkle" (1994)

Music video
- "Itsumademo Suki de Itakute" on YouTube

"Itsumademo Suki de Itakute" (いつまでも好きでいたくて; lit. "I Want to Love You Forever") is the 20th single by Japanese idol duo Wink. Written by Yasushi Akimoto and Kazuhiko Katō, the single was released on February 23, 1994, by Polystar Records.

== Background and release ==
"Itsumademo Suki de Itakute" was used by Shimadaya for their Teppan Noodles commercial. The B-side, "Ai wo Ubatte Kokoro Shibatte", was used as an image song for NTT Kyushu.

"Itsumademo Suki de Itakute" peaked at No. 19 on the Oricon's weekly charts and sold over 79,000 copies.

== Track listing ==
All music is arranged by Satoshi Kadokura.

No.	Title	Lyrics	Music	Length
1.	"Itsumademo Suki de Itakute" ((いつまでも好きでいたくて; "I Want to Love You Forever"))	Yasushi Akimoto	Kazuhiko Katō	4:43
2.	"Ai wo Ubatte Kokoro Shibatte" ((愛を奪って心縛って; "Take Away Love and Bind Your Heart"))	Yumi Yoshimoto	Daisuke Inoue	4:29
3.	"Itsumademo Suki de Itakute" (Original Karaoke)
4.	"Ai wo Ubatte Kokoro Shibatte" (Original Karaoke)

== Chart positions ==
Weekly charts

Chart (1994)	Peak position
Japanese Oricon Singles Chart	19

Year-end charts

Chart (1994)	Peak position
Japanese Oricon Singles Chart	257
