= Boys Don't Cry (Moulin Rouge song) =

1988 single by Moulin Rouge

Single by Moulin Rouge

from the album Boys Don't Cry
- Released: 1988
- Recorded: 1987
- Genre: Hi-NRG; synth-pop
- Label: Expanded Music
- Songwriter: Matjaž Kosi

Boys Don't Cry is a 1988 hit single for Yugoslav Italo disco duo Moulin Rouge, led by songwriter Matjaž Kosi.

== Track listing ==
All tracks are written by Matjaž Kosi.

No.	Title	Length
1.	"Boys Don't Cry" (Club Mix Version)	5:33
2.	"Boys Don't Cry" (a Cappella Version)	0:50
3.	"Boys Don't Cry" (Tear Gas Version)	4:13
4.	"Boys Don't Cry" (Radio Version)	3:28

== Wink version ==
"Namida wo Misenai de (Boys Don't Cry)"

Single by Wink

from the album Especially for You: Yasashisa ni Tsutsumarete
- Language: Japanese
- B-side: "Only Lonely"
- Released: 16 March 1989
- Recorded: 1989
- Genre: J-pop; dance-pop
- Label: Polystar
- Composer: Matjaž Kosi
- Lyricist: Neko Oikawa
- Producer: Haruo Mizuhashi

Wink singles chronology
"Ai ga Tomaranai (Turn It Into Love)" (1988)	"Namida wo Misenai de (Boys Don't Cry)" (1989)	"Samishii Nettaigyo" (1989)

Music video
- "Namida wo Misenai de (Boys Don't Cry)" on YouTube

"Boys Don't Cry" was covered by Japanese idol duo Wink as "Namida wo Misenai de (Boys Don't Cry) ("涙をみせないで 〜Boys Don't Cry〜; lit. "Don't Show Tears (Boys Don't Cry)"). Released by Polystar Records on 16 March 1989, it was their fourth single, with Japanese lyrics written by Neko Oikawa. The B-side is "Only Lonely", a Japanese-language cover of The Dooleys' 1980 single "Body Language".

The single became Wink's second No. 1 on Oricon's singles chart. It sold over 523,000 copies and was certified Platinum by the RIAJ.

=== Track listing ===
All lyrics are written by Neko Oikawa; all music is arranged by Motoki Funayama.

No.	Title	Music	Length
1.	"Namida wo Misenai de (Boys Don't Cry)" ((涙をみせないで 〜Boys Don't Cry〜; "Don't Show Tears (Boys Don't Cry)"))	Matjaž Kosi
2.	"Only Lonely"	Ben Findon; Mike Myers; Bob Puzey

=== Chart positions ===
Weekly charts

Chart (1989)	Peak position
Japanese Oricon Singles Chart	1
Japanese The Best Ten Chart	1

Year-end charts

Chart (1989)	Peak position
Japanese Oricon Singles Chart	10
Japanese The Best Ten Chart	5

=== Certifications ===
Region	Certification	Certified units/sales
Japan (RIAJ)	Platinum	400,000^{^}
^{^} Shipments figures based on certification alone.
