= Moulin Rouge (band) =

Yugoslavia popular music group

- Origin: Slovenia (part of Yugoslavia when band was founded)
- Genres: Hi-NRG, synthpop
- Years active: 1985-present
- Labels: ZKP RTVLJ; ZKP RTVS; Hit Factory
- Members: Matjaž Kosi, keyboards, writer, producer, vocal / Karmen Plazar, vocal

Moulin Rouge (named after the French cabaret) is a Slovenian popular music group consisting of vocalist Alenka Šmid-Čena and songwriter, keyboardist, and producer Matjaž Kosi.

== Profile ==
Keyboardist Matjaž Kosi founded Moulin Rouge after leaving Slovenian (then Yugoslav) synthpop band Videosex in 1985. Initially, Moulin Rouge consisted of three men; after reorganizing, Matjaž Kosi held an audition for a female vocalist. Alenka Šmid-Čena was chosen as lead vocalist. The band took its 1980s membership of Matjaž Kosi and Alenka Šmid-Čena in 1987. They were active primarily from the late 1980s to the early 2000s, and their work combines elements of 1980s Eurodance, Italo disco, Hi-NRG, and trance. Moulin Rouge entered Jugovizija, the Yugoslav national pre-selection for the Eurovision Song Contest, in 1987 with the song "Bye bye baby," finishing in sixth place, and returned a year later with the song "Johnny je moj," finishing in fourth place. In 2000 Matjaž Kosi released a truly solo album (2010 - title inspired by the sequel of the Stanley Kubrick movie 2001: A Space Odyssey meaning long absence from the music scene). He wrote, played, produced and sang all the vocal parts. The album was for Slovenia only; no English version has been done so far. After working with many other artists, he met Karmen Plazar, a young female singer with a solo album already released. Kosi made a cover version of Moulin Rouge's classic hit Prvi tvoj poljub (Your First Kiss), where she was introduced as Lady C. After promising feedback from listeners, Kosi invited her to join Moulin Rouge as a vocalist in 2002. The result was the album The Best Of 2002, a remake album of Moulin Rouge's 1980s hits. After that, they returned to international audiences with the single Just A Start, which received very good reviews, but due to lack of promotion and distribution, its success was moderate. The follow-up was My Heart Is Beating Boom, which went viral after the introduction of YouTube. It was widely accepted by Japanese anime fans, who made their own video versions based on anime clips.

Moulin Rouge has enjoyed notable success among fans of electronic dance music in Germany, Scandinavia, United States, Italy, and particularly Japan. Internationally, their best known singles include "High Energy Boy" (1987) and "Boys Don't Cry" (1988). The latter was covered in a Japanese-language version entitled Namida o Misenaide (Boys Don't Cry) by Japanese female pop duo Wink in 1989. The cover, with lyrics by songwriter Neko Oikawa, reached #1 on the Oricon weekly single chart.

In 2016, the band posted new photos on their Facebook page announcing their revival, with Matjaž Kosi as producer and Karmen Plazar appearing as vocalist.

== Discography in Slovenia ==
Year	Title	Record label
1985	Mi plešemo (mala plošča) ("We Dance (Vinyl single)")	ZKP RTVLJ
1987	Moulin Rouge	ZKP RTVLJ
1988	Johnny	ZKP RTVLJ
1989	Najslajši poljubi ("Sweetest Kisses"); The first popular music album released on Compact Disc in Slovenia.	ZKP RTVLJ
1990	Tea For Two	Victor / ZKP RTVS
2000	2010 - Album	Hit Factory
2002	The Best Of - 2002	Hit Factory

== International discography ==
Year	Title	Format
1987	High Energy boy	Single
1988	D.J. I Wanna Be Your Record	Single
1988	Boys Don't Cry	Single
1988	Boys Don't Cry (US remix)	Single
1989	Boys Don't Cry (Also released as Out of Control.)	Album
1989	The Megamix	Single
1989	Baby I Miss You	Single
1989	Stranger	Single
1990	Sugar Candy Kiss	Single
1990	Tea For Two	Single
1990	Tea For Two	Album
2002	Just A Start	Single
2003	My Heart Is Beating Boom	Single
2004	Boys Don't Cry	Single
2006	Back Like A Boomerang	Single
