= Sakihokore Itoshisa yo =

Single by Wink

from the album Brunch
- Language: Japanese
- English title: It's in Full Blossom and Love
- B-side: "Made in Love"
- Released: September 8, 1993
- Recorded: 1993
- Genre: J-pop; dance-pop
- Length: 3:33
- Label: Polystar
- Composer: Tetsurō Oda
- Lyricist: Maki Ohguro
- Producer: Haruo Mizuhashi

Wink singles chronology
"Kekkon Shiyoune" (1993)	"Sakihokore Itoshisa yo" (1993)	"Itsumademo Suki de Itakute" (1994)

Music video
- "Sakihokore Itoshisa yo" on YouTube

"Sakihokore Itoshisa yo" (咲き誇れ愛しさよ; lit. "It's in Full Blossom and Love") is the 19th single by Japanese idol duo Wink. Written by Maki Ohguro and Tetsurō Oda, the single was released on September 8, 1993, by Polystar Records.

== Background and release ==
"Sakihokore Itoshisa yo" was used by Shiseido for their "Premier" commercials featuring Wink.

"Sakihokore Itoshisa yo" peaked at No. 9 on the Oricon's weekly charts, becoming the duo's final top-10 release. It sold over 337,000 copies and was certified Gold by the RIAJ.

== Track listing ==
No.	Title	Lyrics	Music	Arrangement	Length
1.	"Sakihokore Itoshisa yo" ((咲き誇れ愛しさよ; "It's in Full Bloom and Love"))	Maki Ohguro	Tetsurō Oda	Takeshi Hayama	3:33
2.	"Made in Love"	Rui Serizawa	Seshirō Kusunose	Satoshi Kadokura	4:45
3.	"Sakihokore Itoshisa yo" (Original Karaoke)				3:30

== Chart positions ==
Weekly charts

Chart (1993)	Peak position
Japanese Oricon Singles Chart	9

Year-end charts

Chart (1993)	Peak position
Japanese Oricon Singles Chart	90

== Certifications ==
Region	Certification	Certified units/sales
Japan (RIAJ)	Gold	200,000^{^}
^{^} Shipments figures based on certification alone.
