= Manatsu no Tremolo =

Single by Wink

from the album Queen of Love
- Language: Japanese
- English title: Midsummer Tremolo
- B-side: "Shake It"
- Released: June 19, 1991
- Recorded: 1991
- Genre: J-pop; dance-pop
- Length: 4:05
- Label: Polystar
- Composer: Takashi Kudō
- Lyricist: Neko Oikawa
- Producer: Haruo Mizuhashi

Wink singles chronology
"Kitto Atsui Kuchibiru (Remain)" (1991)	"Manatsu no Tremolo" (1991)	"Haitoku no Scenario" (1991)

Music video
- "Manatsu no Tremolo" on YouTube

"Manatsu no Tremolo" (真夏のトレモロ, Manatsu no Toremoro; lit. "Midsummer Tremolo") is the 11th single by Japanese idol duo Wink. Written by Neko Oikawa and Takashi Kudō, the single was released on June 19, 1991, by Polystar Records.

== Background and release ==
"Manatsu no Tremolo" was used by Panasonic for their RQ-S35 and RQ-S35V headphone commercial. The B-side is "Shake It", which was co-written by veteran musician and producer Kiichi Yokoyama (under the pseudonym "KE-Y").

"Manatsu no Tremolo" became Wink's fourth and final consecutive single to peak at No. 2 on the Oricon's weekly charts. It sold over 225,000 copies and was certified Gold by the RIAJ.

== Track listing ==
All music is arranged by Satoshi Kadokura.

No.	Title	Lyrics	Music	Length
1.	"Manatsu no Tremolo" (Manatsu no Toremoro (真夏のトレモロ; "Midsummer Tremolo"))	Neko Oikawa	Takashi Kudō	4:05
2.	"Shake It"	Yoshiko Miura	KE-Y	4:43

== Charts ==
Weekly charts

Chart (1991)	Peak position
Japanese Oricon Singles Chart	2

Year-end charts

Chart (1991)	Position
Japanese Oricon Singles Chart	63

== Certifications ==
Region	Certification	Certified units/sales
Japan (RIAJ)	Gold	200,000^{^}
^{^} Shipments figures based on certification alone.
