= Haitoku no Scenario =

Single by Wink

from the album Sapphire
- Language: Japanese
- English title: An Immoral Scenario
- B-side: "Jūnigatsu no Orihime"
- Released: October 16, 1991
- Recorded: 1991
- Genre: J-pop; dance-pop
- Length: 4:27
- Label: Polystar
- Composer: Takashi Kudō
- Lyricist: Neko Oikawa
- Producer: Haruo Mizuhashi

Wink singles chronology
"Manatsu no Tremolo" (1991)	"Haitoku no Scenario" (1991)	"Tsuioku no Heroine" (1991)

Music video
- "Haitoku no Scenario" on YouTube

"Haitoku no Scenario" (背徳のシナリオ, Haitoku no Shinario; lit. "An Immoral Scenario") is the 12th single by Japanese idol duo Wink. Written by Neko Oikawa and Takashi Kudō, the single was released on October 16, 1991, by Polystar Records.

== Background and release ==
"Haitoku no Scenario" was written and composed as a fusion of Russian traditional music and 1970s disco, themed around a lonely man living in a cold Siberian town. Like the duo's previous single "Manatsu no Tremolo", the song was used by Panasonic for their RQ-S35 and RQ-S35V headphone commercial. The B-side, "Jūnigatsu no Orihime", is a Japanese-language cover of Zoe Haywood's "My World".

"Haitoku no Scenario" peaked at No. 3 on the Oricon's weekly charts and sold over 196,000 copies.

== Track listing ==
All lyrics are written by Neko Oikawa; all music is arranged by Satoshi Kadokura.

No.	Title	Music	Length
1.	"Haitoku no Scenario" (Haitoku no Shinario (背徳のシナリオ; "An Immoral Scenario"))	Takashi Kudō	4:27
2.	"Jūnigatsu no Orihime" ((12月の織姫; "Orihime in December"))	Billie Hughes; Roxanne Seeman	4:46

== Charts ==
Weekly charts

Chart (1991)	Peak position
Japanese Oricon Singles Chart	3

Year-end charts

Chart (1991)	Position
Japanese Oricon Singles Chart	108
