= Turn It into Love =

1988 single by Kylie Minogue

- Cover for digital release

Single by Kylie Minogue

from the album Kylie
- B-side: "Made in Heaven"
- Released: 21 December 1988
- Studio: RBX (Melbourne, Australia)
- Genre: Hi-NRG
- Length: 3:37
- Label: PWL
- Songwriters: Mike Stock; Matt Aitken; Pete Waterman
- Producer: Stock Aitken Waterman

Kylie Minogue singles chronology
"It's No Secret" (1988)	"Turn It into Love" (1988)	"Hand on Your Heart" (1989)

Audio video
- "Turn It into Love" on YouTube

"Turn It into Love" is a single released by Australian singer Kylie Minogue. It was taken from her debut studio album Kylie (1988). The single was released in December 1988 in Japan only. The B-side was a new song "Made in Heaven", which also served as the B-side to both "Je ne sais pas pourquoi" and "It's No Secret" in other international territories.

The song, written and produced by Stock Aitken Waterman (SAW), was also released by British singer Hazell Dean the same year, sparking years of speculation about which performer recorded it first. But the track's writer and producer Matt Aitken insists it was written for Minogue, and later given to Dean when it became apparent the Australian singer did not need another UK single from her debut album.

Kylie performed the song (as part of medleys) during her On a Night Like This Tour and Showgirl Homecoming shows in the 2000s, as well the Mushroom Records 25th birthday concert in Melbourne, Australia in 1998.

== Critical reception ==
A favourite track among Stock Aitken Waterman enthusiasts, the song also featured on the 2005 UK compilation album Stock Aitken Waterman Gold, one of just two tracks included that were not released as a single in the UK. Retrospectively, in 2017, Christian Guiltenane of British magazine Attitude described it as "one of SAW's most amazing songs", noting "its exuberant xylophone intro and lilting melody" but with "a melancholy in the verses". In 2021, British magazine Classic Pop ranked the song number 21 in their list of 'Top 40 Stock Aitken Waterman songs', adding that it "is surely one of their finest creations for Minogue". In 2024, the same magazine ranked the song at number 18 in its list of "Top 40 Kylie Minogue songs", describing it as a "breezy, moreish serving of galloping SAW loveliness". In 2023, Robert Moran of Australian daily tabloid newspaper The Sydney Morning Herald ranked the song as Minogue's 38th best song (out of 183), adding that it is the "proof that Kylie's been doing Euro-disco since the very beginning. The chorus is the sort of earworm you'll suddenly find yourself repeating every time you turn a tap, a doorknob, etc".

== Format and track listing ==
This is the format and track listing of major single release of "Turn It into Love".

Japanese 7" single and 3" CD

1. "Turn It into Love" – 3:35
2. "Made in Heaven" – 3:29

== Official versions ==
"Turn It into Love"

- Album version / single version
- Instrumental: Initially used on a very rare Turkish bootleg 7" in 1988 and then as the theme music to the 'gallery' section of the 2002 Greatest Hits 1987–1992 DVD. Also made available as part of PWL's re-issues of back catalogue releases on iTunes.
- Extended instrumental: included exclusively on the Japanese Greatest Hits 1987–1997 CD in 2003.
- Backing Track: Unavailable until the PWL's re-issues of back catalogue releases on iTunes.

No official vocal extended version of "Turn It into Love" was ever produced at PWL.

"Made in Heaven"

- Album version / single version
- Maid in England Mix, aka Made in Australia Mix or Made in Sweden Mix.
- Heaven Scent Mix (edit): shorter version included on the Australian "Never Too Late" single and the UK Greatest Hits 87–92 (2002 release).
- Heaven Scent 12" Mix (extended): included exclusively on Greatest Remix Hits Volume 4 in Australia in August 1998.
- Original 12" Mix: Unavailable until the PWL's re-issues of back catalogue releases on iTunes.
- Instrumental: Unavailable until the PWL's re-issues of back catalogue releases on iTunes.
- Backing Track: Unavailable until the PWL's re-issues of back catalogue releases on iTunes.

== Live performances ==
Minogue performed the song on the following concert tours:

- On a Night Like This Tour (as part of the Hits Medley)
- Showgirl: The Homecoming Tour (as a medley with "Light Years")
- Tension Tour (as part of a fan request at the Tokyo show)

== Charts ==
Chart (1988)	Peak position
Japan (Oricon Singles Chart)	34

== Sales ==
Region	Certification	Certified units/sales
Japan	—	46,320

== Hazell Dean version ==
"Turn It into Love"

Single by Hazell Dean

from the album Always
- Released: 12 September 1988
- Recorded: 1988
- Length: 3:35
- Label: EMI
- Songwriters: Mike Stock; Matt Aitken; Pete Waterman
- Producer: Stock Aitken Waterman

Hazell Dean singles chronology
"Maybe (We Should Call It a Day)" (1988)	"Turn It into Love" (1988)	"Love Pains" (1989)

In September 1988, just prior to Kylie's "Turn It into Love" being released in Japan, British Hi-NRG singer Hazell Dean released her version which was also produced by Stock Aitken Waterman, however, the arrangement was noticeably different from that of Kylie's version.

=== Background and release ===
Published reports and notes contained in Dean's own 2012 greatest hits compilation, Evergreen, have claimed that the singer was at PWL Studios recording "Maybe" when she was played a selection of songs being recorded for Kylie's debut album. In this version of events, "Turn It into Love" stood out, and she liked the song so much, she asked Pete Waterman to let her record her own version of the song. Waterman obliged and it was eventually released as the lead into the release of Dean's second Stock Aitken Waterman-produced album Always in October 1988.

However, Dean has refuted these long-repeated claims, insisting she never knew Kylie had recorded the song until the Australian singer's version later came to prominence. Asserting that she thought she was recording a totally original song when given "Turn It into Love", Dean admitted she was "p-ed off" when she discovered there had been a double up, calling the reuse of the song by SAW "a cop out".

=== Chart performance ===
Dean's version of "Turn It into Love" was a moderate hit in Europe. It peaked at number 21 in the UK Singles Chart for the week ending 8 October 1988, number 30 in Swiss singles chart for the week ending 30 October 1988, and number three in Finland on 19 November 1988. On the overall Eurochart Hot 100, it peaked at number 68, and charted for five weeks.

=== Critical reception ===
A review in Pan-European magazine Music & Media deemed the song "a very professional disco record with the familiar PWL groove". James Hamilton from Record Mirror praised the extended version, stating this "SAW created attractively trotting (0-)115 3/4-115 2/3-115 3/4 bpm plaintive light swinger is not surprisingly very Kylie Minogue-like (though better sung!), being one of the best song from her LP – a generous move giving it to Hazell as such an obviously hit-bound single".

=== Charts ===
1988 weekly chart performance for "Turn It into Love"
Chart (1988)	Peak position
Europe (European Hot 100)	68
Europe (European Airplay Top 50)	48
Finland (Suomen virallinen lista)	3
Ireland (IRMA)	21
Switzerland (Schweizer Hitparade)	30
UK Singles (Official Charts)	21
UK Dance (Music Week)	20
US Dance Club Songs (Billboard)	38

== Wink version ==
"Ai ga Tomaranai (Turn It into Love)"

Single by Wink

from the album At Heel Diamonds
- Language: Japanese
- B-side: "Ding Ding: Koi kara Hajimaru Futari no Train"
- Released: 16 November 1988
- Recorded: 1988
- Genre: J-pop; dance-pop
- Length: 3:29
- Label: Polystar
- Composer: Stock Aitken Waterman
- Lyricist: Neko Oikawa
- Producer: Haruo Mizuhashi

Wink singles chronology
"Amaryllis" (1988)	"Ai ga Tomaranai (Turn It into Love)" (1988)	"Namida wo Misenai de (Boys Don't Cry)" (1988)

Music video
- "Ai ga Tomaranai (Turn It into Love)" on YouTube

"Turn It into Love" was covered by Japanese idol duo Wink as "Ai ga Tomaranai (Turn It into Love)" (愛が止まらない 〜Turn It into love〜; lit. "Love Doesn't Stop (Turn It into Love)"). Released by Polystar Records on 16 November 1988, it was their third single, with Japanese lyrics written by Neko Oikawa. The song was used as the theme of the Fuji TV drama series Oikaketaino! (I Want to Chase!). The B-side is a Japanese-language cover of Annica Burman's "I en ding ding värld".

The single became Wink's first No. 1 on Oricon's singles chart. It sold over 645,000 copies, making it the duo's biggest-selling single.

=== Track listing ===
All lyrics are written by Neko Oikawa; all music is arranged by Motoki Funayama.

No.	Title	Music	Length
1.	"Ai ga Tomaranai (Turn It into Love)" ((愛が止まらない 〜Turn It into love〜; "Love Doesn't Stop (Turn It into Love)"))	Stock Aitken Waterman	3:29
2.	"Ding Ding: Koi kara Hajimaru Futari no Train" (Din Din ~Koi kara Hajimaru Futari no Torein~ (Ding Ding 〜恋から始まるふたりのトレイン〜; "Ding Ding ~Two Trains Starting from Love~"))	Lasse Andersson; Bruno Glenmark	2:59

=== Charts ===
Weekly charts

Chart (1988)	Peak position
Japanese Oricon Singles Chart	1
Japanese The Best Ten Chart	1

Year-end charts

Chart (1988)	Position
Japanese Oricon Singles Chart	5

=== Cover versions ===
Year	Artist	Album
1995	Hideki Saijo	Ai ga Tomaranai (愛が止まらない) (Single)
2001	Puffy AmiYumi	The Hit Parade
2003	Yuki Koyanagi	Koyanagi the Covers Product 2
2003	Dream	Dream World
2008	Demon Kogure	Girls' Rock √Hakurai
2009	ManaKana	Two Sing 2 (ふたりうた2 Futari Uta 2)
2010	Junichi Inagaki (duet with Nanase Aikawa)	A Man and a Woman 3 (男と女3 Otoko to Onna 3)
2011	Serial TV Drama	Power Spot (パワースポット Pawāsupotto )
2020	Lovers Wanted	Lovers Wanted

== Other versions ==
Brother-sister duo Same Difference recorded "Turn It into Love" and included it on their 2008 debut album Pop. In 1990, Hong Kong band Echo covered this song in Cantonese and Mandarin and was nominated for Most Popular Mandarin Song category in 1991 Jade Solid Gold Best Ten Music Awards.
