= Sachiko Suzuki =

Japanese singer, actress and talent

Sachiko Suzuki (鈴木早智子, Suzuki Sachiko; born February 22, 1969) is a Japanese singer, actress and tarento, who was a member of the idol duo, Wink.

== Discography ==
Albums

- 1992.03.25 : Mode (mini album, outside Wink). Oricon number 17
- TRANSFER
- Hollywood na koi wo shite
- Saigo no Rakuen
- 2003.12.10 : Rei ~re-generation~

Singles

- 1996.02.25 : La Gioconda
- 1998.10.28 : Innocent Sky ~Kanashimi mo Todokanai ano Sora no Mukou e~
