= Shoko Aida =

Japanese singer and actress (born 1970)

Aida Shōko
- 相田 翔子
- Born: 23 February 1970 (age 56); Higashimurayama, Tokyo, Japan
- Occupations: Actress; singer
- Years active: 1988–present
- Spouse: Hiromitsu Aizawa (m. 2008)
- Children: 1
- Relatives: Yoko Tsukasa (mother-in-law)
- Website: 相田翔子オフィシャルサイト：Blue Star

Shoko Aida (相田 翔子, Aida Shōko; born 23 February 1970) is a Japanese singer and actress. She was a member of the J-pop duo Wink, after which she became a solo artist.

== Career ==
She debuted as a member of the J-pop duo Wink.

She began working as a solo artist on 1 April 1996, one month after Wink dissolved. She collaborated with Kaori Iida from Morning Musume for one DVD and one photobook in 2004.

== Personal life ==
Shoko Aida was born on 23 February 1970, in Higashimurayama, Tokyo.

In 2008, Aida married Hiromitsu Aizawa, son of actress Yoko Tsukasa and politician Hideyuki Aizawa. In 2012, she gave birth to their only child, a daughter.

== Discography ==
=== Albums ===
- Delphinium (mini album, outside Wink) (25 May 1992) (Oricon number 9)
- Joia (25 May 1996)
- Luz (25 May 1997)
- Paris, je t'aime d'amour (29 January 2003)
- To Pathos (27 November 2003)
- This Is My Love (4 September 2013)

=== Singles ===
- "I Julia" (20 January 1996)
- "Joia" (25 April 1996)
- "Hadaka de Nemurimasho" (25 August 1996)
- "Yurikago wo Yusurarete" (2 May 1998)
- "Konya Dake Kitto" (with Stardust Revue) (15 May 2000)
- "Kureta no Shiroi Suna" (28 April 2004)
- "Yoake No Ame Wa Pianissimo" (17 November 2004)

==== Compilations ====
- C'est mon na – Best of Shoko Aida (30 January 2002)
- Song Selection ~25th Celebration~ (5 June 2013)

=== DVD ===
- Aegekai – Shoko Aida & Kaori Iida (4 February 2004)

== Filmography ==
=== Film ===
- Pride (1998), Mitsue Tojo
- The Man in White (2003)
- Hana and Alice (2004)
- Rainbow Song (2006)
- Tokyo Ghoul (2017)
- Liar × Liar (2021)
- Scroll (2023)

=== Television ===
- The Scent of the Wind (2026), Kae Miyagawa
