= Wink (duo) =

Japanese musical duo

Wink ウィンク
- Sachiko Suzuki and Shoko Aida

Background information
- Origin: Tokyo, Japan
- Genre: J-pop
- Years active: 1988–1996; Reunions: 1998; 2008; 2018
- Label: PolyStar
- Past members: Sachiko Suzuki; Shoko Aida
- Website: www.polystar.co.jp/wink30th/

Wink (ウィンク, Uinku) was a Japanese female pop duo composed of Sachiko Suzuki and Shōko Aida. Active from 1988 to 1996, the duo became prominent in Japanese popular music during the late 1980s and early 1990s. They made their recording debut in April 1988 with the single "Sugar Baby Love," a Japanese-language cover of the song by the British group the Rubettes. Wink rose to national prominence with "Ai ga Tomaranai (Turn It Into Love)" in 1988 and achieved further success with "Samishii Nettaigyo", which won the Japan Record Award in 1989.

The duo became known for their synth-pop and Eurodisco-influenced music, coordinated choreography, and distinctive doll-like stage image. Following the suspension of their activities in 1996, Suzuki and Aida pursued separate careers in entertainment.

== History ==
In 1987, Sachiko Suzuki and Shoko Aida both entered a beauty contest given by the magazine Up to Boy. Suzuki won 7th place and Aida won 9th place. The following year, Suzuki and Aida were chosen to form the duo.

On April 27, 1988, they debuted with the single "Sugar Baby Love", a cover of an English song by The Rubettes. The single topped at #20 on the Oricon Chart, and was chosen as the theme song of the Fuji TV drama Netsuppoi no! (熱っぽいの!, I'm Feverish!), which starred Yoko Minamino and Shizuka Kudo.

Their next single, "Amaryllis" (アマリリス, released September 7, 1988) charted at only #30 on the Oricon chart. However, the release of their third single "Ai ga Tomaranai (Turn It into Love)" (愛が止まらない〜Turn it Into Love~; Love Won't Stop~Turn it Into Love, released November 16, 1988) was their first breakout hit, their first single to reach #1 on the Oricon, as well as their first single to make #1 on both of the major television music programs, namely TBS's The Best Ten and NTV's Uta no Top Ten. The single was also used at the theme song of the Fuji TV drama series Oikaketai no! (I Want to Chase!), also starring Minamino and Rie Miyazawa. The single was a cover of Kylie Minogue's "Turn It into Love", with Japanese lyrics written by lyricist Neko Oikawa. Selling over 645,000 copies, it was the duo's biggest-selling single.

On March 16, 1989, their fourth single "Namida wo Misenaide ~Boys Don't Cry~" (涙をみせないで〜Boys Don't Cry~; Don't Show Your Tears~...). This single was also a cover of a European pop song, this time a cover the single Boys Don't Cry by Moulin Rouge, and also charted at #1. Following this trend, many of Wink's early songs were covers of Western songs, but with Japanese lyrics.

The duo's fifth single "Samishii Nettaigyo" (淋しい熱帯魚, Lonely Tropical Fish), released on May 21, 1989 exceeded their success from the previous year. The single charted #1 on Oricon for two straight weeks, and took the #1 spot on The Best Ten and Uta no Top Ten. The single also won the Grand Prix at the 31st Japan Record Awards and landed them their first and only performance on NHK's Kōhaku Uta Gassen. It sold over 564,000 copies and was certified Platinum by the RIAJ.

Wink had a different style and image than many other J-pop idols of the era who focused on a "cute" style with sugar coated lyrics. The duo were instructed to be as emotionless as possible while performing. They also dressed in extravagant lolita fashions, and almost looked doll-like. This uniqueness in style distinguished them from their contemporaries and attributed to their success. Following "Samishii Nettaigyo", the duo released a string of #1 and #2 hits, and the duo continued to appear as mainstays on The Best Ten and Uta no Top Ten.

=== Decline and disbandment ===
By the early 1990s, however, Wink's sales started to decline. Many of their later songs were original works written by Japanese composers, with a toned-down, less-European style. Many other idols were also beginning to cover European pop songs in the wave of Wink's success, thus their sound became less original. Their singles rarely hit the No. 1 spot after early 1990, although they sold respectably until 1994. In the 1990s, many people were looking for fresher-sounding music, and Eurodance music became popular thanks to Tetsuya Komuro and the many artists he produced, many of them under the Avex Trax label. In 1995, Wink tried to generate more sales by reversing course and putting out a Euro-style single, "Jive Into The Night ~Yaban na Yoru ni~", but it was a flop, only reaching No. 92 on the Oricon charts. Their next single, "Angel Love Story ~Aki-iro no Tenshi~", did somewhat better, but sales were still poor.

In February 1996, the duo were notified by their management that their activities were to be suspended on March 31. Suzuki and Aida had stated several times on TV that Wink had not officially disbanded, but was considered "inactive"; eventually, they admitted that Wink was in a de facto disbanded state.

Suzuki and Aida have reunited as Wink on every eighth year of each decade to celebrate the duo's anniversary. Their first reunion was on the 40th Japan Record Awards in 1998, followed by an appearance on TBS' New Year's Eve countdown special Koeru! Terebi on December 31, 1999. The duo celebrated their 20th anniversary on the 50th Japan Record Awards in 2008. In 2018, they celebrated their 30th anniversary by making appearances on NHK's Dai 50-kai Omoide no Melody special and the 60th Japan Record Awards.

=== Solo careers ===
After Wink, Suzuki and Aida became TV personalities, although not often appearing together. They also continued recording music as solo singers; they released their first solo albums in 1992, and after the break-up, they released their first solo singles. Their solo music is quite different from the music they did as Wink; for example, Aida's music features a more Mediterranean style.

In 2004, Aida released a DVD and photobook called The Aegean Sea (エーゲ海, Eegekai) with then-Morning Musume member Kaori Iida.

Aida married in 2008 and subsequently gave birth to a daughter in 2012.

== Discography ==
Studio albums

- Moonlight Serenade (1988)
- Especially for You: Yasashisa ni Tsutsumarete (1989)
- Twin Memories (1989)
- Velvet (1990)
- Crescent (1990)
- Queen of Love (1991)
- Sapphire (1991)
- Each Side of Screen (1992)
- Nocturne (Yasōkyoku) (1992)
- Aphrodite (1993)
- Brunch (1993)
- Overture! (1994)
- Voce (1994)
- Flyin' High (1995)

== Filmography ==
=== Kōhaku Uta Gassen appearances ===
Year / Broadcast	Appearance	Song	Appearance order	Opponent
1989 (Heisei 1) / 40th	Debut	"Samishii Nettaigyo"	4/20	Hikaru Genji

== Bibliography ==
- [Aug 10, 1989] ISBN 4-8470-2117-7 Double Tone (Pictorial)
- [Apr 10, 1990] ISBN 4-8470-1107-4 Twinkle Angels [TOTTEOKI NO Wink] (Book)
- [Sep 10, 1990] ISBN 4-8470-2151-7 WINKISSIMO (Pictorial)
- [Oct 5, 1991] ISBN 4-8470-2215-7 LEGEND (Pictorial)
