= Billie Hughes =

American musician (1948–1998)

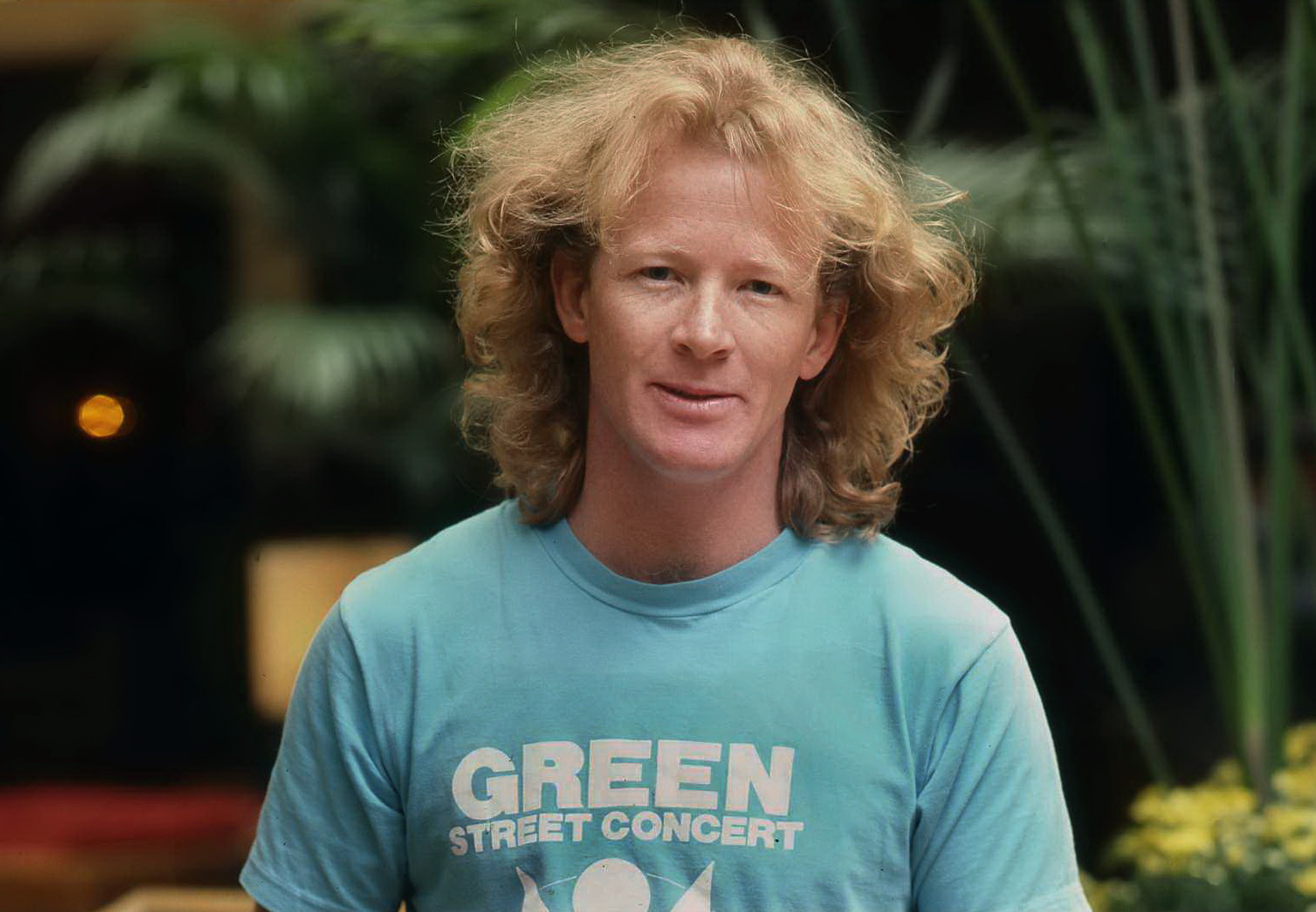
- Hughes in 1984
- Born: Billie Keith Hughes; April 4, 1948; Graham, Texas
- Died: July 3, 1998 (aged 50); Los Angeles, California
- Other name: Bill Hughes
- Education: Abilene Christian University
- Occupations: Recording artist; singer-songwriter; record producer; publisher
- Years active: 1968–1998
- Partner: Roxanne Seeman (1982-1998)
- Children: 2
- Parents: Billie Wayne Hughes (father); Betty Capps Hughes (mother)
- Awards: Japan Gold Disc Award Single of the Year, Emmy Awards
- Musical career
- Genres: Blue-eyed soul; pop rock; pop; soul; contemporary Christian; folk; soft rock
- Occupations: Singer; songwriter; record producer; multi-instrumentalist
- Instruments: Vocals; guitar; piano; violin; keyboards; synthesizers
- Formerly of: Lazarus

Billie Keith Hughes (April 4, 1948 – July 3, 1998) was an American singer, recording artist, songwriter, musician, and record producer. He is best known for his successful artist career in Japan, lead vocalist of his band Lazarus and his collaboration with Roxanne Seeman writing songs for Philip Bailey, Phil Collins, Bette Midler, The Jacksons, The Sisters Of Mercy, Wink, and for his songs in film and television. He has two Emmy nominations.

Hughes song "Welcome To The Edge", with the Japanese title "Todokanu Omoi"とどかぬ想い (One-Sided Love)" was the theme of the Japanese television drama I'll Never Love Anyone Anymore (Mou Daremo Aisanai) (もう誰も愛さない). It became the top-selling international single in Japan in 1991 after selling over 500,000 copies. Hughes was awarded the Japan Gold Disc Award for International Single of the Year in 1992 at the NHK Grand Prix Japan Gold Disc Awards.

I'll Never Love Anyone Anymore (Mou Daremo Aisanai) (もう誰も愛さない) featuring Billie Hughes "Welcome to the Edge" ("Todokanu Omoi") began rebroadcasting on TVK (Television Kanagawa) in the Greater Tokyo Area, on October 8, 2019.

== Early life and education ==
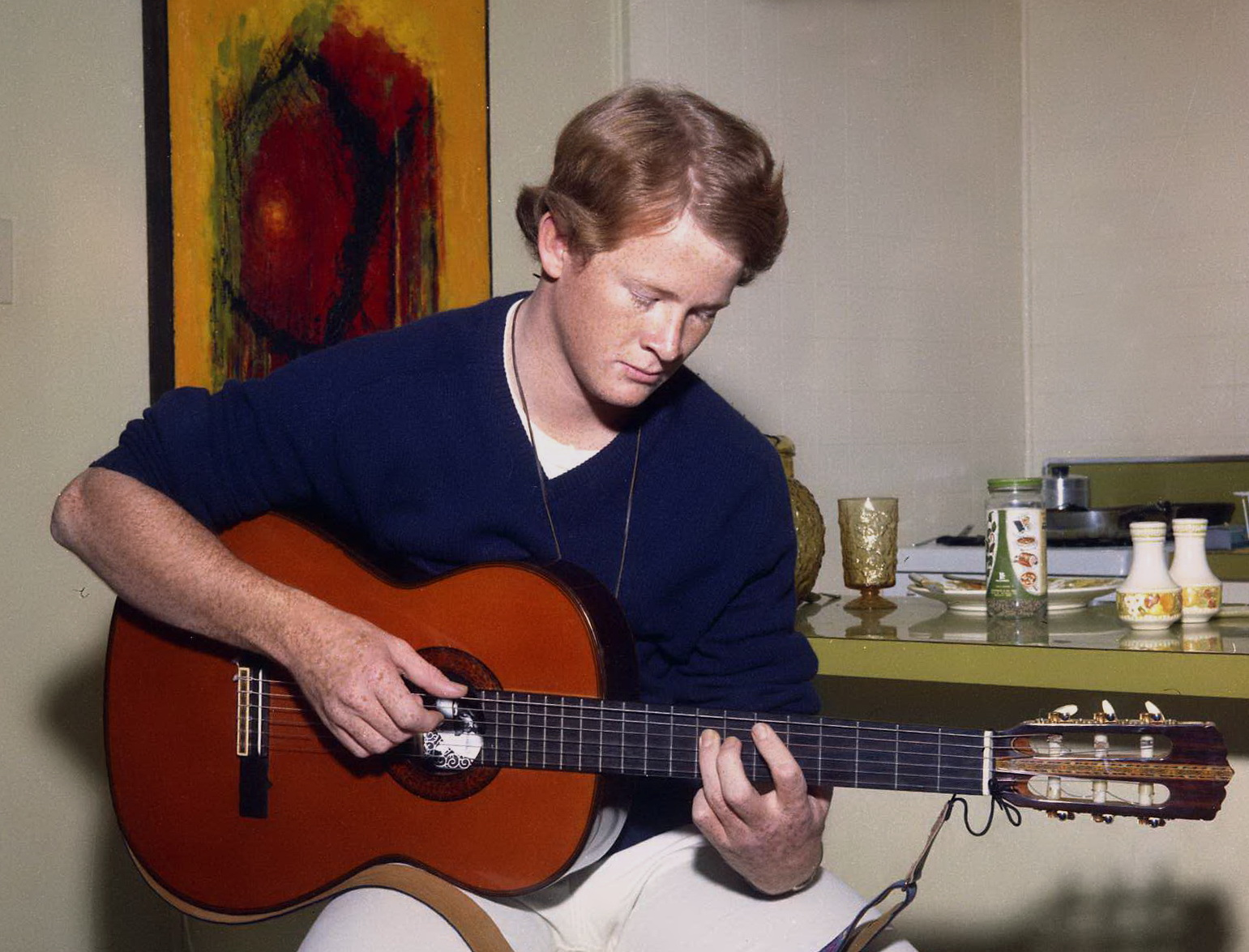
Billie Hughes on Abilene Christian College campus 1968

Billie Keith Hughes was born on April 4, 1948, in Graham, Texas, the son of Betty (née Capps) and Billie Wayne Hughes (August 5, 1924 - November 14, 2011), a travelling minister of the Church of Christ, math teacher, and general contractor. He had an older brother named Jim, (April 10, 1945 - May 3, 2019). Billie Keith was raised in a religious family moving from city to city. His father, Billie Wayne, was a minister, elder and education director of the Church of Christ in Sioux Falls, South Dakota, Denver, Colorado, and Marble Falls, Texas. Billie Wayne Hughes wrote "Studying Angels" and taught three classes on angels at the Abilene Christian University.

Hughes attended Abilene Christian College in Abilene, Texas. Hughes was offered a scholarship to Boston University as a violinist, but turned it down. He was the first chair violinist in the Abilene Christian College Orchestra and a member of the Abilene Christian College Acapella Choir. In September 1967, he became a member of the ACCents, an on-campus group that was formed two years earlier. All four singers in the new lineup played instruments. The ACCents performed for civic clubs, events including the Purple and White alumni parties over the state, the ACC chapel, and toured youth fellowships sponsored by Churches of Christ in Dallas, Jackson, Mississippi; Macon, Georgia; and Jacksonville, Gainesville, Tampa and Hialeah, Florida. Hughes was quoted as saying "A lot of our job is recruiting." In contemporizing their repertoire, he remarked "It's music that belongs to the set of today instead of the set of 10 to 20 years ago"

He played violin in the ACC Orchestra tour of Oklahoma, Kansas, and Texas, December 8–14, 1968 and in the Abilene Philharmonic Orchestra accompaniment for the homecoming musical "Oklahoma!".

Hughes co-founded another popular campus singing group called the Blue Sky Investment. The group consisted of Hughes, arranger, tenor vocalist and classical guitarist, Mike Haynes and Kay Ross on vocals, Carl Keesee on bass, and Marshal Locke on drums. The Blue Sky Investment held performances at Abilene Christian College, the University of Oklahoma, and for private engagements. Hughes composed original arrangements of songs from the Beatles repertoire for Blue Sky Investment performances opening a series of shows by ACC talent on April 4, 1968.

While at ACC, Hughes formed his own band, Shiloh, with Carl Keesee and Gary Dye. They met Peter Yarrow after a Peter, Paul & Mary concert at a local venue, and played their tape for him. They were signed by Yarrow and Phil Ramone to Bearsville Records, after which he dropped out of college and moved into Peter Yarrow's cabin in Woodstock to pursue his career with his band, renamed Lazarus.

== Career ==
=== Lazarus ===
Hughes began his recording career as leader of the group Lazarus. In association with Peter Yarrow of Peter, Paul & Mary, Lazarus moved to Woodstock, New York, signing with the newly formed Bearsville Records label, under the direction of Albert Grossman.

"Yarrow's influence on the group's style was dramatic...Before Peter taught us how to sing together, our style was delicate, baroque and mainly Instrumental. We seldom used more than a solo voice in any of our original material."

— Bill Hughes,

The band spent two and a half years perfecting their sound. Noel Paul Stookey recorded the band at his studio in Rye, New York, choosing to record “Meanings Will Change” for his solo album Paul and and performing the song in live appearances. Four of the songs were produced by Peter Yarrow and Phil Ramone on the debut Lazarus album. The Stookey recordings were released digitally in 2006 as Billie Hughes Awaiting Lazarus. Lazarus released their first eponymous Lazarus in 1971, followed by A Fool's Paradise in 1973.

Two Lazarus albums produced by Yarrow and Phil Ramone were recorded and released on Bearsville. In the next four years, Lazarus performed extensively throughout the United States and Canada. They opened for Todd Rundgren in Vermillion, South Dakota, at his University of South Dakota concert, a city known in pop culture as the Vermillion Rundgren name-drops on his Back to the Bars live album.

In 1974, The Lettermen covered the Hughes song "Eastward", from the first Lazarus album. It was released as a single, reaching No. 16 on the Billboard US Adult Contemporary chart, and included on The Lettermen's Now and Forever album.

In 1976, as lead singer along with Lazarus, Bill Hughes won the Clio Award for "Life Savers" Best Commercial of the Year which ran nine years nationwide. Hughes was also the singer of the Dr Pepper and Goodyear commercials.

=== Solo career ===
In the later '70s Hughes lived in London, Ontario Canada where he regularly performed at Smale's Pace, a well-known coffeehouse on the Canadian folk circuit, at Groaning Board, at Riverboat Coffee House and at folk festivals across Canada. He was a performer at the inaugural Festival of Friends in Hamilton, Ontario in 1976. During the Canadian years he was sometimes accompanied by David Bradstreet and Lazarus bassist Carl Keesee, and occasionally Lazarus performed as a full band including Randy Kumano, Allan Soberman and Wayne Smith.

John Capek, the first independent producer to produce a broadcast recording for the CBC, produced Bill Hughes at the CBC studios.

In January 1978, CBS Records Canada announced the signing of Bill Hughes, former member of the band Lazarus, to a long-term recording contract. Hughes was the first recording artist signed by the Canadian affiliate of CBS to receive a guaranteed American release and full tour support. A reception for the signing of Hughes was held at the Prince Hotel in Toronto. Hughes shared his intention of setting up his residence in Canada and applying for Canadian citizenship and spoke of his plans to record in Los Angeles in the following months.

In 1982, Hughes released an album entitled "Last Catch" credited to "Horton, Bates & Best", a solo album by Bill Hughes that was re-released digitally in 2006 with the title "A Tribute to Canadian Songwriters" by Billie Hughes. The album comprised nine cover versions of songs by Canadian songwriters including: Bruce Cockburn, David Wiffen, Brent Titcomb, David Bradstreet, Colleen Peterson and David Essig and was well received by the Canadian press.

=== Work with Anne Murray ===
In Toronto, Hughes met and recorded background vocals for Anne Murray on the title track of her Let's Keep It That Way album in 1978. In the mid-1980s, he toured with Murray singing the duet part of "Nobody Loves Me Like You Do" and "Now and Forever". Hughes performed "Now and Forever" with Anne Murray at the American Music Awards in 1986.

=== Dream Master ===
Hughes' Dream Master album was produced by Henry Lewy and recorded at A&M Recording Studios in Los Angeles. Jose Feliciano appears on the track "Only Your Heart Can Say" as a guest artist on guitar and background vocals. Dream Master was released in 1979 and re-released in Osaka, Japan in 1982 when Hughes was performing in Osaka.

=== Working with Roxanne Seeman ===
In 1982 Hughes met Roxanne Seeman and began a collaborative relationship writing songs together. Later that year, Hughes took an offer to perform live as a solo artist in a club in Osaka, Japan where he met Jiroh Gotoh of Kamifusen and began plans for recording a Kamifusen album in Santa Monica, California. In 1983, Hughes returned to Los Angeles, producing Here With Me that summer with original songs by Jiroh Gotoh, Bill Hughes, “Cherry Blossoms” by Peter Yarrow, and a Japanese adaptation of “The Outside In” by Carmine Coppola, Italia Pennino and Roxanne Seeman.

That same year, Hughes performed lead vocals for “Stay Gold” and “The Outside In” on Carmine Coppola’s soundtrack album for The Outsiders (I ragazzi della 56ª strada), released in Italy by Ricordi.

In collaboration with Jiroh Gotoh and Kamifusen, Here With Me was released in Japan in 1984, followed by Echo of Love in 1986, produced by Hughes in Toronto with members of The Anne Murray Band, and songs by Hughes and Seeman on Angel on the Roof, in 1991. Hughes and Seeman returned to Japan, developing their relationship with FujiPacific Music and repertoire of recordings by Japanese artists, Wink and Yoshimi Iwasaki, produced by Bobby Watson of Rufus, among them.

Hughes continued in partnership with Roxanne Seeman recording, producing, and writing songs for film, television, and records including songs produced by Phil Collins, Arif Mardin, Michael Omartian, George Duke and Reggie Lucas and recorded by Philip Bailey, The Jacksons, Bette Midler, The Sisters Of Mercy, Randy Crawford, Al Jarreau, Melissa Manchester, and the No. 1 charting Japanese duo Wink, among others.

In 1990, Hughes wrote "Welcome to the Edge" with Roxanne Seeman and Dominic Messinger, for the daytime TV drama Santa Barbara. It appeared for the first time in January 1991 performed by Billie Hughes and continued as a recurring love theme for a love triangle over the next two years. A female vocal version also appeared in the show. "Welcome to the Edge" was recorded in Japanese by the female J-pop duo Wink (ウィンク, Uinku).

In 1991, a new arrangement of Hughes' "Welcome to the Edge", produced with Roxanne Seeman, appeared as a theme song in the hit Japanese TV drama I'll Never Love Anyone Anymore (Mou Daremo Aisanai) (もう誰も愛さない) "Welcome To The Edge" (with the Japanese title "Todokanu Omoi"とどかぬ想い (One-Sided Love)) was the single and title track from the album released by Pony Canyon Japan. "Welcome to the Edge" remained in the Top 10 of the Billboard Japan chart for four months, selling 520,000 singles. The album sold 120,000 copies.

In March 1992, Hughes performed "Welcome to the Edge" (with the Japanese title "Todokanu Omoi"とどかぬ想い (One-Sided Love)) at the NHK nationally televised Japan Grand Prix Awards and received the award for "#1 International Single of the Year" alongside MC Hammer performing "U Can't Touch This" in the same category.

"Welcome to the Edge" received an Emmy nomination for Best Original Song in the television show Santa Barbara. Hughes and Seeman wrote "Dreamlove" (Dream Love), a love theme appearing in the daytime television show Another World, for which they received a second Emmy nomination for Best Original Song.

"Walls Of Love" and "I Love The Way You Make Me Feel" performed by Hughes appeared in the original 1989 Baywatch series.

In September 2004, The Great Wall Concert, the first-ever pop concert staged on the Great Wall of China took place outside of Beijing with Alicia Keys headlining. Hughes and Seeman's song "Walking on the Chinese Wall" by Philip Bailey produced by Phil Collins was the finale of the event.

== Film soundtracks ==
=== Martin Eden ===
During the next four years, Hughes toured the United States, Canada and Japan performing as an artist and travelled to Japan, Canada and Italy to record and produce various projects including his own hit single "Martin Eden" (CBS motion picture theme song) which charted top 5 all over Europe.

Hughes wrote the song "Martin Eden" with Italian composers Ruggero Cini and Dario Farina. It was written from the composer's theme from the Martin Eden 1979 TV mini-series based on the Jack London novel, directed by Giacomo Battiato.

Hughes recorded his vocals for "Martin Eden" in Rome. It was released as a single in Europe where it topped the Billboard charts in several territories, such as Sweden where it reached No. 2.

=== The Outsiders ===
Hughes performed the songs "Stay Gold" written by Stevie Wonder with Carmine Coppola and "The Outside In" written by Carmine Coppola, Italia Pennino and Roxanne Seeman on The Outsiders (Original Motion Picture Soundtrack).

=== Little Monsters ===
Hughes performed the song "I Wanna Yell" written and produced by Hughes and Seeman for the montage scene of Little Monsters. The song played as Maurice, (Howie Mandel), and Brian Stevenson, (Fred Savage), played pranks.

He also performed the song "Magic Of The Night", written and produced by Mike Piccarillo, for the movie.

=== Television performances ===
- American Music Awards with Anne Murray, "Now and Forever", 1986
- NHK Grand Prix Gold Disk Awards, Japan

== Death ==
Hughes died on July 3, 1998, of a heart attack in Los Angeles. He was survived by his parents, two daughters and his partner, Roxanne Seeman.

== Discography ==
=== Albums ===
==== With Lazarus ====
- 1971: Lazarus
- 1973: A Fool's Paradise

==== Solo ====
- 1976: Street Life
- 1979: Dream Master
- 1981: Horton, Bates & Best: The Last Catch
- 1991:Welcome to the Edge
- 2006: A Tribute to Canadian Songwriters (re-issue)

=== Singles ===
- 1972: "Warmth Of Your Eyes", Lazarus
- 1973: "Ladyfriends I (Sing a Song to Your Lady)," Lazarus
- 1979: "Martin Eden", theme from Martin Eden (miniseries)
- 1979: "Stealin' My Heart Away" (7", Promo)
- 1991: "Welcome to the Edge" (CD, Mini, Single)

=== Notable album appearances ===
- 1972: Peter - Peter Yarrow; on "River of Jordan", "Take off Your Mask" (background vocals)
- 1976: Street Life, CBC Radio Canada Broadcast Recording series, songs: "Quiet Moment", "Gypsy Lady", and "Dreams Come True"
- 1978: Let's Keep it That Way - Anne Murray; on "Let's Keep it That Way" (background vocals)

=== Selected songwriting credits ===
- 1971: "Blessed" by Lazarus on Lazarus
- 1971: "Meanings Will Change" by Paul Stookey on Paul and
- 1972: "Warmth of Your Eyes" by Lazarus on Lazarus
- 1973: "Ladyfriends I (Sing a Song to Your Lady)" by Lazarus on A Fool's Paradise
- 1973: "Blessed" by Noel Paul Stookey on One Night Stand
- 1974: "Eastward" by The Lettermen on Now and Forever
- 1974: "Blessed" by Gene Cotton on In the Gray of the Morning
- 1976: "Quiet Moment" by Bill Hughes on Street Life CBC series
- 1978: "Quiet Moment" by Bob McBride on My World Is Empty Without You
- 1979: "Martin Eden" theme from Martin Eden (miniseries) by Bill Hughes
- 1979: "Stealin' My Heart Away" by Bill Hughes on Dream Master
- 1979: "Only Your Heart Can Say" by Bill Hughes on Dream Master
- 1980: "Ändlösa vatten" Swedish adaptation of Martin Eden (Billie Hughes song) by September
- 1984: "Walking on the Chinese Wall" by Philip Bailey on Chinese Wall
- 1985: "Heart of Love" from The Heavenly Kid OST by Jamie Bond
- 1987: "Love Is An Art" by Pernilla Wahlgren on Pure Dynamite
- 1988: "One Way" by Al Jarreau on Heart's Horizon
- 1989: "The Blue Line" by Yoshimi Iwasaki on Tsuki-yo ni Good Luck
- 1989: "I Wanna Yell" from Little Monsters by Billie Hughes
- 1989: "If You'd Only Believe" by The Jacksons on 2300 Jackson Street
- 1991: "Welcome To The Edge" love theme from Santa Barbara by Billie Hughes
- 1991: "Todokanu Omoi"とどかぬ想い (One-Sided Love) by Billie Hughes
- 1991: "Welcome To The Edge" by Bon Chic
- 1991: "Night and Day" by Bette Midler on Some People's Lives
- 1991: "Welcome To The Edge" by Billie Hughes on Welcome To The Edge
- 1991: "Yoru no Tsuki, Hiru no Tsuki" (夜の月、昼の月, "Night Moon, Day Moon") by Wink on Queen of Love1991: "Jūnigatsu no Orihime" (12月の織姫, "Orihime in December") by Wink on Back to Front
- 1991: "Omoide made Soba ni Ite (Welcome to the Edge) [Album Version]" ((想い出までそばにいて (Welcome To The Edge), "I'll Stay by Your Side Until You Remember (Welcome to the Edge)" by Wink on Back to Front
- 1991: "Like a Bird" by Wink on Each Side of Screen
- 1992: "If You'd Only Believe" by Randy Crawford on Through the Eyes of Love
- 1993: "Under The Gun" by The Sisters of Mercy on A Slight Case of Overbombing
