= A Tribute to Canadian Songwriters =

Studio album by Billie Hughes
- Released: 1981, 2006
- Recorded: Toronto, Canada
- Genre: Folk; pop
- Length: 50 minutes
- Label: Street Records; Noa Noa Music, Inc.
- Producer: Billie Hughes; David Bradstreet; Carl Keesee

Billie Hughes chronology
Dream Master (1981)	A Tribute to Canadian Songwriters (1981)	Dream Master (1991)

A Tribute to Canadian Songwriters is a concept album by American singer-songwriter and guitarist Billie Hughes of cover recordings of songs by prominent Canadian songwriters from the London, Ontario and Toronto music scene of the ‘70s. It was released in 1981 on vinyl and re-issued in 2006.

== Background ==
A Tribute To Canadian Songwriters was conceived as a concept project by Hughes, David Bradstreet and former Lazarus member Carl Keesee, initially released as nine songs on vinyl with the title Horton, Bates & Best: The Last Catch. It was produced by Hughes, Keesee, and Bradstreet, who engineered the recording at his studio and released it on his independent label, Street Records. It was reissued digitally with the addition of three songs on January 17, 2006 at iTunes Music Store.

Among the songs chosen are "Sahajiya" written by Brent Titcomb and first released in 1971 as a single by Tommy Graham and Friends, Bruce Cockburn's "Arrows of Light" from his Joy Will Find A Way 1978 album release, "More Often Than Not" written by David Wiffen and first released by Jerry Jeff Walker in 1970, then covered by Eric Anderson in 1972, "Albert's Cove" by David Essig, and "White Lines" written by Willie P. Bennett and recorded by David Wiffen with Bruce Cockburn and Brian Ahern as producers.

== Critical reception ==
In a glowing review in the Montreal Gazette, John Griffin calls the Bill Hughes album “the first rough gem to be uncovered in the new year” and gives high marks to Billie’s “soaring cut-glass tenor”. Mark Tremblay of the Calgary Herald complimented the sound of the album, writing “The backup instrumentation is crisp and sure, the production uncluttered and tasteful” and “Hughes’ voice and guitar style epitomize folk’s best qualities.”

Pondering on the viability of the arts in Canadian culture, Bob Rittinger of the Waterloo Region Record highlights examples of folk music, commending the song selection of the album as excellent, writing “occasional songs are almost exquisite” and Hughes for having “quite a remarkable voice. Deep, rich and textured, it is well-suited to these often haunting songs of our people and our culture.”

== Track listing ==
A Tribute to Canadian Songwriters track listing
No.	Title	Writer(s)	Length
1.	"Albert’s Cove"	David Essig	4:23
2.	"Arrows of Light"	Bruce Cockburn	2:53
3.	"Sweet Hands of Time"	Beverly Glenn-Copeland	4:11
4.	"Last Catch"	David Bradstreet	3:55
5.	"White Line"	Willie P. Bennett	3:26
6.	"More Often Than Not"	David Wiffen	3:40
7.	"Devil’s Pony"	Doug McArthur	4:06
8.	"Beverly"	Colleen Peterson	2:51
9.	"Sahajiya"	Brent Titcomb	3:27
10.	"I Love the Way You Make Me Feel"	Billie Hughes; Janice Nelson; Roxanne Seeman	4:30
11.	"Fearless Love"	Hughes; Seeman	4:44
12.	"It’s Over"	Hughes; Bradstreet; Seeman	4:04
13.	"Out of the Blue"	Hughes; Bradstreet	3:52

== Personnel ==
Credits adapted from the liner notes of Horton, Bates & Best: The Last Catch, A Tribute to Canadian Songwriters

- Billie Hughes – vocals, guitar, synth
- Carl Keesee – bass, synth, saxophone
- David Bradstreet – engineer
- David Houghton – drums, percussion
- Gary Craig – drums
- Peter Bleakney – bass
- Aidan Mason - guitar
- Matt Zimbel – percussion
- Jane Siberry – background vocals

== Production ==
- Billie Hughes – producer
- David Bradstreet – producer, engineer
- Carl Keesee – producer
- Bob Carbone – mastering, A&M Studios
- Brenda Bradstreet– graphic design, 1981 vinyl release
- Maurice Cardinal - photography
- Ozan Sokmen – graphic design
