= Martin Eden (disambiguation) =

Martin Eden is a 1909 novel by Jack London.

Martin Eden may also refer to:

- Martin Eden (1914 film), an incomplete silent film based on London's novel
- Martin Eden (miniseries), a 1979 Italian miniseries based on the novel
  - "Martin Eden" (Billie Hughes song), theme song for the miniseries
- Martin Eden (2019 film), an Italian film based on the novel
- "Martin Eden" (Nekfeu song), 2015
- Eluvium (musician), also known as Martin Eden

== See also ==
- The Adventures of Martin Eden, a 1942 black-and-white film based on the novel
