= Warmth of Your Eyes =

Single by Lazarus

from the album Lazarus
- B-side: "Circuit Rider"
- Released: 1972
- Recorded: Bearsville Studio, Woodstock, New York
- Genre: Folk; Rock; Soft rock; Contemporary Christian music
- Length: 2:58
- Label: Bearsville
- Songwriter(s): Bill Hughes
- Producer(s): Phil Ramone and Peter Yarrow

Lazarus singles chronology
"Warmth of Your Eyes" (1972)	"Ladyfriends I (Sing a Song to Your Lady)" (1973)

Music video
- "Warmth of Your Eyes" on YouTube

"Warmth of Your Eyes" is a song written by American singer-songwriter Billie Hughes. The song was produced by Peter Yarrow, of Peter, Paul and Mary, and Phil Ramone and released in 1972 as a single by Lazarus on the band's debut eponymous Lazarus album by Bearsville Records, distributed by Warner Bros. Records Inc.

“Warmth of Your Eyes” became a popular processional wedding song and cover song in the ‘70s.

== Inspiration and writing ==
Lazarus leader, Billie Hughes, was responsible for the musical composition and lyrics for “Warmth of Your Eyes”.

The Rock columnist Jim Davis described the song as “liturgical”, quoting from the lyrics “And when we’re living in the holy church of Jesus, I can look into your eyes and you in mind and we will know and maybe show he didn’t live in vain” and writing “the feeling is stronger than any emotion that a traditional church hymn ever drew out of me.”

== Critical reception ==
Billboard, October 23, 1971, gave the eponymous Lazarus album a Special Merit Pick with "Warmth of Your Eyes" cited as one of the best cuts, describing "honesty in the lyrics and optimism in the chords". Bruce Eder of AllMusic described the sound of the band's songs as "acoustic rock with minimal amplification and lots of harmony vocals".

“Warmth of Your Eyes" was a Billboard Recommended Pick, May 6, 1972. Billboard Picks and Plays reported airplay.

The Austin American called the sound of Lazarus a “special brand of gospel-folk music” citing “Warmth of Your Eyes” as the “strong cut on the LP”.

Jeffrie Jones for Thousand Oaks Star called it a “contemporary song” citing a recent cover version and live performance by “Salt River” choir ensemble.

Bruce Kirkland of The Toronto Star described the songs as “religiously inspired” with “haunting melodic beauty and almost naïve approach to life, with emphasis on happiness through love” and characterizing “Warmth of Your Eyes” as “gentle”.

== Credits and personnel ==
Credits are adapted from the album's liner notes.

Lazarus

- Bill Hughes – vocal, guitar
- Carl Keesee – vocal, bass
- Gary Dye – vocal

Production

- Phil Ramone – producer, recording engineer
- Peter Yarrow – producer, musical director

== Other versions ==
On March 28, 2011, the song was featured on the folk rock mix album Late Night Tales: Midlake.
