= Martin Eden (Billie Hughes song) =

Single by Billie Hughes

Single by Bill Hughes

from the album Martin Eden (Original Soundtrack)
- B-side: "Mexicana"; "Martin Eden (Instrumental)"
- Recorded: 1979
- Genre: Soundtrack
- Length: 3:28
- Label: CBS
- Songwriters: Bill Hughes; Ruggero Cini; Dario Farina

Bill Hughes singles chronology
"Martin Eden"	"Stealin' My Heart Away"

Music video
- "Martin Eden" on YouTube

"Martin Eden" is a song by American singer-songwriter Bill Hughes written for the 1979 TV mini-series Martin Eden based on the Jack London novel Martin Eden, directed by Giacomo Battiato and starring Christopher Connelly. The song is the vocal version of the composers' theme with music written by Italian composers Ruggero Cini and Dario Farina and lyrics by Bill Hughes.

CBS/Epic arranged the collaboration between Hughes in the US and Ruggero Cini and Dario Farina Italy. Hughes wrote the lyrics and flew to Rome for the recording.

Martin Eden was released as a single in Europe by CBS. The song charted in several territories including Sweden, where it entered the chart on January 31 and peaked at number 2 on March 7, 1981.

In Germany, it was first broadcast on Sunday, October 12, 1980, and the three following Sundays.

CBS Germany released "Martin Eden" both as a single and as an additional track on Hughes Dream Master album, with "Martin Eden" appearing as the first track. A still photo of Christopher Connelly from the Italian film appears as the album cover artwork with a thumbnail inset of the photo of Hughes from the original Dream Master album cover artwork in the upper right-hand corner. Both of the titles, "Dream Master" and "Martin Eden", appear on the vinyl disc cover art.

== Tracklist ==
No.	Title	Length
1.	"Martin Eden"	3:28
2.	"Mexicana"	3:28
3.	"Martin Eden (Instrumental)"	3:28

== Formats ==
Title	Label	Catalogue Number	Country	Year
Martin Eden (7", Single)	CBS	CBS 9510	Netherlands	1980
Martin Eden (7", Single)	CBS	8041	Sweden	1979
Martin Eden (Original Soundtrack Theme) (7", Single)	CBS	CBS S 8041, CBS 8041	Germany	1979
Martin Eden (7", Single)	CBS	CBS S 8041, CBS 8041	Germany	1979

"Tulák Po Hvězdách"

Single by Petr Rezek
- B-side: "Rozdily (A Presto TE MAM RAD)"
- Released: 1984
- Genre: Pop
- Length: 2:57
- Label: CBS
- Songwriters: Bill Hughes; Ruggero Cini; Dario Farina; Czech lyrics Zdeněk Rytíř

Music video
- "Tulák Po Hvězdách (Martin Eden)" on YouTube

== Petr Rezek version ==
Czech artist Petr Rezek recorded "Martin Eden" with the Czech lyrics and title "Tulák Po Hvězdách" (Wandering in the Stars) as a single in 1984. It was recorded with his band Centrum.

"Tulák Po Hvězdách (Martin Eden)" was included in the Peter Rezek retrospective album Pop Gallerie, released by Supraphon in 2008.

== Cover versions ==
- Smugglers, Poland, 2009
- Las Mejores Series de TV Vol. 2, 2014
