= Here to Sing =

Studio album by Bob McBride
- Released: 1978
- Studio: Soundstage Studios
- Genres: Rock, pop, jazz
- Label: MCA Records
- Producer: Jack Richardson

Bob McBride chronology
Sea of Dreams (1973)	Here to Sing (1978)

Singles from Here to Sing
- 1. "Sail On, Sailor (Through The Night)/White Sands" Released: 1979; 2. "My World Is Empty Without You" Released: 1979; 3. "Love is A Four Letter Word/You Send Me" Released: 1979

Here to Sing is the third solo studio album by Canadian singer-songwriter Bob McBride, released in March 1978 by MCA Records. Produced by Jack Richardson, it mostly consists of cover versions such as “Sail On, Sailor” by The Beach Boys and “You Send Me” by Sam Cooke and two originals written by McBride.

== Overview ==
For “Here to Sing”, McBride presented a new image of himself as a crooner, clean-cut and stylish, after having been the lead singer in the jazz rock band Lighthouse, belting vocals over blaring horns.

The album and singles received radio airplay. MCA Records featured McBride in their promotional suite at the Three Days In March 1978 music industry event, which RPM noted as the most interesting suite of the major labels.

== Critical reception ==
In New Releases, RPMI praised the album writing “…this set establishes him as one of the best in his field…” commending Bill Hughes’ “Quiet Moment” and Mike McQueen's “Light of Love” and Sam Cook's “You Send Me, couldn’t be interpreted better.”

== Track listing ==
Credits adapted from liner notes.

Side one
No.	Title	Writer(s)	Length
1.	"Mother’s Upbringing"	Craig Howard Stew	4:42
2.	"My World Is Empty Without You"	(Lamont Dozier, Eddie Holland, Brian Holland)	3:25
3.	"You Send Me"	Sam Cooke	4:38
4.	"The Day the Flowers Left"	David McHugh	5:58

Side two
No.	Title	Writer(s)	Length
1.	"Light of Love"	Mike McQueen	4:06
2.	"Sail On, Sailor"	Brian Wilson, Jack Rieley, Ray Kennedy, Tandyn Almer, Van Dyke Parks	3:33
3.	"Love is a Four Letter World"	Bob McBride	4:25
4.	"Moonlight Dancer"	Bob McBride	3:55
5.	"Quiet Moments"	Bill Hughes	3:31

== Personnel ==
- Bob McBride – vocals
- Danny McBride – guitar
- Michael Brecker – tenor saxophone
- Randy Brecker - trumpet
- Scott Cushnie – keyboards
- Doug Riley – keyboards
- Bob McLaren – drums
- Brian Leonard– percussion
- Jim MacDonald – French Horn
- Brad Warnaar – French Horn
- Russ Little – tenor trombone
- Guido Basso - trumpet

Production

- Jack Richardson – producer, mixing
- Brian Christian – engineer
