= Smale's Pace =

Coffeehouse in London, Ontario, Canada

- Address: 436 Clarence Street
- Location: London, Ontario, Canada
- Type: Coffeehouse
- Event: Folk music

Construction
- Opened: 1969

Smale's Pace was a Canadian coffeehouse located at 436 Clarence Street, London, Ontario, Canada. It was a key venue for folk rock and singer songwriter music made famous for featuring Bruce Cockburn, Willie P. Bennett, David Essig, Brent Titcomb, Billie Hughes, David Bradstreet, Stan Rogers, Rick Taylor, Mae Moore and The Good Brothers.

== History ==
Smale's Pace opened in 1969 under the ownership of John Smale. The venue was converted from a Bell Canada garage. Willie P. Bennett began his performing career at the Smale's Pace, among many Canadian artists who performed on the stage.

== Change of Pace ==
Upon acquiring Smale's Pace, Carl and Annie Grindstaff moved the venue to nearby Talbot Street, re-opening it with the name Change Of Pace. While keeping the same furnishings, the ambiance was more formal. Ken Palmer of bluegrass band the Dixie Flyers was brought in to book the talent and while the venue still focused on singer-songwriters, Palmer booked weekly bluegrass players, as well as touring artists including Connie Kaldor, Roy Forbes, James Durst, and Mark Rust.

== Smale's Pace/Change of Pace Folk Reunion Concert ==
Annual Smale's Pace/Change of Pace Folk Reunion Concerts have featured Ken Whiteley, Brent Titcomb, Colleen Peterson, Jackie Washington, Murray McLauchlan, Perth County Conspiracy, Liam Russell, Fraser & Girard, New Cumberland with John P. Allen, Nora Galloway and The Dixie Flyers.
