= One Night Stand (Paul Stookey album) =

Live album by Paul Stookey
- Released: 1973
- Recorded: December 19, 1972
- Venue: Carnegie Hall
- Genre: Folk; rock; pop; contemporary Christian music
- Length: 51:22
- Label: Warner Bros.

Paul Stookey chronology
Paul and (1971)	One Night Stand (1973)

One Night Stand is a live album by American pop and folk singer-songwriter Paul Stookey. It is a live recording from his Carnegie Hall show on December 19, 1972 and his second solo album released in 1973 on Warner Bros Records.

The album includes new songs written by Stookey and his friends and associates, along with covers including Wedding Song and traditionals. The first half of the show was acoustic, and the second half was an electric set with new material played by the same band as the Paul and album. Peter Yarrow joined him on stage as a guest performer. The album received significant airplay.

With the release of One Night Stand, Stookey changed his name from Noel Paul Stookey to Paul Stookey. The album received positive reviews from music critics. The album was reissued in 1977 under Stookey’s label Neworld Media.

== Critical reception ==
Professional ratings
Review scores
Source	Rating
AllMusic	2/5 stars

Paul Talbert for the Detroit Free Press wrote "on such songs as 'There is Love' and 'Blessed' the honey flow is tempered by his musicianship and even some poetry, too."

Ron LaRoche of The Terre Haute Tribune exclaimed "This is an excellent concert album full of a lot of good music and cheer. It's comfortable and relaxing, almost nostalgic."

== Track listing ==
No.	Title	Writer(s)	Length
1.	"Desert Island"	Paul Stookey; Kniss	2:50
2.	"House Song"	Paul Stookey; Bannard	3:40
3.	"Get Together"	Chet Powers	4:07
4.	"Hymn"	Stookey; Mason; Gold	2:48
5.	"Who Love The Girls"	Stookey	1:15
6.	"Wedding Song (There Is Love)"	Public Domain Foundation, Inc.	3:25
7.	"Weave Me The Sunshine"	Peter Yarrow	5:03
8.	"One Note Melody"	Mottau; Stookey	4:13
9.	"Blessed"	Bill Hughes	4:50
10.	"Edgar"	Epstein; Stookey	2:38
11.	"Funky Monkey Part 1 (Part Two is up to You)"	Paul Stookey; Milstein	3:09
12.	"The Mermaid Song"	Stookey	1:00
13.	"Holly (One Night Stand)"	Stookey	3:03
14.	"Jingle Bells"	Traditional, Adapt and Arr Stookey	2:09

== Personnel ==
- Eddie Mottau – producer
- Tom Flye – engineer
- Shelly Yakus – mixer
- Barbara Kotler, Doris Cylkowski – liner notes
- Ed Thrasher – art direction
