= Paul and =

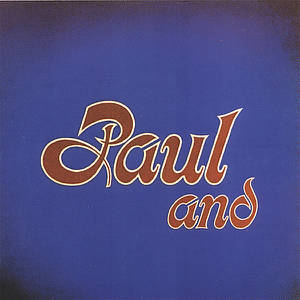

Studio album by Paul Stookey
- Released: January 1, 1971
- Studios: Record Plant, New York City; The Basement Recording Studio, New York City
- Genres: Folk; rock; pop
- Length: 45:58
- Label: Warner Bros.
- Producers: Jim Mason; Ed Mottau

Paul Stookey chronology
Paul and (1971)	One Night Stand (1973)

Singles from Paul and
- 1. "Wedding Song (There Is Love)" Released: 31 July 1971

Paul and is the debut solo studio album by American pop and folk singer-songwriter Noel Paul Stookey released in 1971 on Warner Bros. Records. "Wedding Song (There Is Love)" was issued as an advance single, reaching No. 24 on the Hot 100 in Billboard and No. 3 on the Easy Listening chart. The album has appeared on best seller lists, charting in the US and Canada.

== Cover art ==
The cover art for Paul and was designed by Milton Glaser. The photos of Stookey on the jacket hide his trademark goatee identifying him in the Peter, Paul and Mary covers, to change his image as a solo artist.

== Critical reception ==
Professional ratings
Review scores
Source	Rating
AllMusic	3.5/5 stars

Ernie Santosuosso for The Boston Globe called it “good enough to make Stookey a star, a “live” ticket on the concert circuit. Describing the lyric of “Wedding Song” as “simple and sensitive”, “Sebastian” as carrying “the stamp of consideration substance” and “Ju Les Ver Negre En Cheese” making“allusions to the Moon shots”, he opined “You might get bogged down in the interpretation of some lyrics but the totality of the product somewhat offsets this. Paul Stookey is now his own man musically.”

Ellis Widner of the Moberly Monitor-Index said it was a “fine package” with “some excellent satire,” and a “pure delight,” praising the “high quality of workmanship and production,” and well performed tunes.

The album received positive reviews from music critics.

== Track listing ==
Paul and track listing
No.	Title	Writer(s)	Length
1.	"Gabriel's Mother's Hiway Ballad #16 Blues"	Arlo Guthrie	5:20
2.	"Been on the Road Too Long"	Paul Stookey	2:07
3.	"Hey Sad Sack"	Flast; Stookey	3:32
4.	"Wedding Song (There Is Love)"	Stookey	3:41
5.	"Meanings Will Change"	Bill Hughes	5:41
6.	"Give a Damn"		2:20
7.	"Sebastian"	Stookey	4:06
8.	"Lucy"	Mottau; Ryan	5:00
9.	"Ju Les Ver Negre en Cheese (Ed's Tune)"	Stookey; Kniss	3:45
10.	"Tiger"	Stookey; Mason	3:45
11.	"Tender Hands"	Stookey	3:45
12.	"John Henry Bosworth"	Stookey	4:58
Total length:			45:58

== Production ==
- Jim Mason – producer
- Ed Mottau – producer
- Shelly Yakus – engineer, mixer
