= Now and Forever (Lettermen album) =

Studio album by The Lettermen
- Released: 1974
- Genre: Traditional pop
- Label: Capitol
- Producers: Ed Cobb; David D. Cavanaugh; Jim Pike

The Lettermen chronology
Alive Again… Naturally (1973)	Now and Forever (1974)	There Is No Greater Love (1975)

Singles from Now and Forever
- 1. "Touch Me in the Morning"/"The Way We Were" Released: 1974; 2. "Eastward" Released: 1974

Now and Forever is the 33rd album by Lettermen. It is a studio album produced by Ed Cobb, David D. Cavanaugh, and Jim Pike, and released in 1974 by Capitol Records. Now and Forever is the group's first album with original songs. For the release of the album, the group changed their name from "The Lettermen" to "Lettermen".

Two songs were released as singles; a medley of “Touch Me in the Morning/The Way We Were” which reached number 31 on the U.S. Adult Contemporary chart and number 10 on the Canadian Adult Contemporary chart, and "Eastward" which reached #16 on the Billboard Adult Contemporary chart.

== Concept and development ==
After 13 years of success with covers and medleys of hit songs, the Lettermen sought new and original songs for their next album, in an effort not to appear as a cover band. Their manager, Jess Rand, and staffer Billy Delbert looked for new material. Included in the album are "Touch Me in the Morning", "Maria", and "Eres Tu", which reached No. 1 on the Cash Box charts in 1974.

In 1968, Bob Engemann of the Lettermen heard the Abilene Christian College group the ACCents, led by lead vocalist Bill Hughes, while they were on a tour of the Southeast United States. Engemann asked for a tape of their songs, which led to the recording of Eastward, for the Now and Forever album.

== Critical reception ==
In a Cashbox album review, the album was called an "up to date collection" saying "given a super treatment by the trio", regarding it as "the best music around". In Billboard, Elliot Tiegel opined that the group's "distinct soft vocal blend" is its "calling card," remarking that the move to "contemporize its sound have not hurt its artistic ability."

Jack Burke wrote for La Crosse Tribune that the album and group are "always on target... and good songs, too." Bill E. Burk of the Memphis Press-Scimitar wrote that the Lettermen have "the easiest voices to listen to" and hearing the Now and Forever "brings on a surging desire to shut your eyes and let the words and the music just penetrate."

== Track listing ==
Song title	Writer	Arrangement
A1.a/b Touch Me in the Morning/The Way We Were (Medley) (3:26)	Michael Masser, Ronald Miller, A. Bergman, M. Bergman, Marvin Hamlisch	Vince Morton
A2. The Most Beautiful Girl (3:08)	Billy Sherrill, Norro Wilson, Rory Bourke	Vince Morton
A3. Top of the World (2:40)	John Bettis, Richard Carpenter	Vince Morton
A4. Just One Smile (2:56)	Randy Newman	Perry Botkin, Jr.
A5. Eastward (2:58)	Bill Hughes	Vince Morton
B1. Isn't It a Shame (2:40)	Randy Edelman	Vince Morton
B2. Maria (3:42)	L. Bernstein, S. Sondheim	Vince Morton
B3. We Will Meet at the Ocean (3:15)	Randy McNeil	Vince Morton
B4. Eres Tu (3:02)	J. C. Calderon, M. Hawker	Vince Morton
B5. Goodbye (3:07)	Vince Morton	Vince Morton

== Personnel ==
- Vocals by The Lettermen
- Vocals, soloist: Jim Pike (track: A4)
- Produced by Ed Cobb, David D. Cavanaugh, and Jim Pike
