= Battiato =

Battiato is an Italian surname. Notable people with the surname include:

- Franco Battiato (1945–2021), Italian singer-songwriter, composer, filmmaker, and painter
- Giacomo Battiato (born 1943), Italian film director and writer
