= Lazarus (Lazarus album) =

Studio album by Lazarus
- Released: 1971
- Studio: A & R Studios, New York City
- Genre: Folk; rock
- Label: Bearsville Records
- Producer: Peter Yarrow; Phil Ramone

Lazarus chronology
Lazarus (1971)	A Fool's Paradise (1973)

Lazarus is the self-titled debut studio album by Texas band Lazarus. It was produced by Peter Yarrow and Phil Ramone, released in 1971 on the Bearsville Records label, and distributed by Warner Bros. Records. "Warmth of Your Eyes" was released as the first single in 1972. The album is considered one of the early albums of the Contemporary Christian movement.

Lazarus was released in the US, UK, Canada, Australia in 1971 and in Japan in 2016.

== Background ==
According to Peter Yarrow's liner notes, Lazarus band members Billie Hughes, Gary Dye and Carl Keesee attended a Peter, Paul and Mary concert in Abilene, Texas, after which they met Peter Yarrow and asked him to listen to their tape. They drove 20 minutes outside Abilene to a small farm house where, sitting on the floor with a single candle light, the band played their tape for Peter.

When I heard their music it was all clear, I knew the role I was to play in this movie… their songs just made me feel so good. When they sang of Jesus, I really didn’t know where to put it in my brain, so I put it in my heart and accepted their path for them – because they were more loving and more giving for it. When they sang simply about people being with people, they told me the story of their own search for some light.

— Peter Yarrow, Lazarus album liner notes, August, 1971

Yarrow invited Hughes, Dye and Keesee to Woodstock, New York, where they lived in his cabin and worked on their self-titled Lazarus album over a period of two years, with Phil Ramone joining them.

Lazarus was one of the first releases on Albert Grossman's Bearsville record label. In April 1972, a launch celebration in London with Albert Grossman in attendance, was hosted by Kinney (WEA), set to distribute the Bearsville label in the UK, with initial album releases by Todd Rundgren, Lazarus and Foghat.

Milton Glaser, designer of the poster for Bob Dylan's Greatest Hits and covers for Peter, Paul and Mary albums, designed the Lazarus album cover.

== Critical reception ==
Roy Woolnough of Westminster and Pimlico News of Greater London exclaimed “This record I would without hesitation rank as the BEST folk record of 1972” saying “the songs are beautiful, the instruments are beautiful and the singing is beautiful. It is tasteful and musically cannot be faulted.”

Paul Baker, Music Director of KEYN wrote in the Rosalia Enterprise “The album is as close to perfect as could be imagined” adding “the production work of Phil Ramone and Peter Yarrow is great.” On the writing of the songs and the live performance, he reflected “One of the most beautiful things about the music of Lazarus is that infused within the lyrics are many direct and indirect references to our Lord” and noted “Their album is still the number one seller in Wichita, Kansas.”

Lazarus received positive reviews from critics who praised the excellence of the vocals, musicianship and songwriting.

Neal Vitale, The Tech wrote: "Lazarus comes off as one of the freshest, most pleasant albums released in quite awhile. Such cuts as the truly beautiful 'Looking Through,' 'Eastward,' and the hauntingly dark 'Rivers' all add up to an excellent first effort."

Apple Music: "filled with gorgeous vocal harmonies and understated yet stirring acoustic instrumental work. Lead singer Bill Hughes’ high, pure tenor serves as a perfect vehicle for the yearning and reverence embodied in his lyrics."

RPM wrote: "A find of PP&M's Peter Yarrow, Lazarus is a highly talented folkish trio very much in the strain of Crosby, Stills et al. Group has a quality of presence, unsurpassed. "River", "Baggage" and "Circuit Rider" get the nod."

== Track listing ==
All tracks are written by Billie Hughes, except where noted.

No.	Title	Writer(s)	Length
1.	"Refugee"		3:30
2.	"Whatever Happened"		4:25
3.	"Looking Through"		5:00
4.	"Listening House"	Hughes; Gary Dye	4:10
5.	"Circuit Rider"		4:08
6.	"Warmth of Your Eyes"		2:58
7.	"Blessed"		3:14
8.	"Eastward"		4:19
9.	"Memory of a Stranger"		3:38
10.	"Doncha Cry"	Hughes; Dye	4:00
11.	"Rivers"		4:40

== Personnel ==
Lazarus

- Bill Hughes – vocals, guitar, violin
- Gary Dye – vocals, piano, organ
- Carl Keesee - vocals, bass

Production

- Cover (Design) – Milton Glaser
- Musical Director – Peter Yarrow
- Engineered, Mixed by Phil Ramone
- Photography – Benno Friedman
- Producer – Peter Yarrow, Phil Ramone
- Liner Notes – Peter Yarrow
- Recorded at A&R Studios, New York City

== Cover versions ==
In 1974, the Lettermen released "Eastward" as a single, reaching number 16 on the Billboard US Adult Contemporary chart.

"Blessed" is included in The Giant Book of Christian Sheet Music published by Alfred.
