= Welcome to the Edge (album) =

Welcome To The Edge

Studio album by Billie Hughes
- Released: June 12, 1991
- Studio: Glass Sea Studio, Los Angeles
- Genre: Pop
- Label: Canyon International
- Producer: Billie Hughes; Roxanne Seeman

Billie Hughes chronology
Dream Master (1979)	Welcome To The Edge (1991)

Welcome to the Edge is the second solo studio album by American singer-songwriter Billie Hughes, released in Japan by Canyon International on June 12, 1991. The title track was released as a single titled "Todokanu Omoi" (とどかぬ想い; "One-Sided Love") and was used as the theme song of the Fuji TV drama series I'll Never Love Anyone Anymore. The song became the No. 1 International Single of the Year in Japan in 1992.

A second song from the album appeared in the Japanese Fuji TV drama In the Name of Love (Ai to lu Na no Moto ni). All of the songs were written by Hughes and Roxanne Seeman with the exception of two songs with additional writers. The album was a commercial success, selling 120,000 copies in Japan.

Warner Music International released "Welcome to the Edge" in Korea and other Southeast Asian territories.

== Background ==
In 1990, the Japanese duo Wink recorded a version of "Welcome to the Edge" titled "Omoide made Soba ni Ite" (想い出までそばにいて; lit. "I'll Stay by Your Side Until You Remember"), which was the B-side of their single "Yoru ni Hagurete (Where Were You Last Night)". FujiPacific, the music publisher for Hughes and Seeman in Japan, proposed the Billie Hughes recording of "Welcome to the Edge" with the Satoshi Kadokura arrangement of the Wink version to Fuji TV as the theme for their upcoming TV drama I'll Never Love Anyone Anymore. When the song was confirmed by Fuji TV, Pony Canyon, also part of the FujiSankei Group, released the song as a single. Hughes and Seeman had two weeks to deliver the album.

The album included songs by Hughes and Seeman that appeared as love themes in U.S. television shows, Hughes' original versions of their songs recorded by artists including Bette Midler and The Sisters of Mercy, and new songs recorded in the two weeks deadline.

== Track listing ==
All tracks are written by Billie Hughes and Roxanne Seeman, except where noted.

CD
No.	Title	Writer(s)	Length
1.	"Welcome to the Edge"	Hughes; Seeman; Dominic Messinger	4:32
2.	"Theme from "The Edge" (Welcome to the Edge)"	Hughes; Seeman; Messinger	0:53
3.	"Hurricane"		5:53
4.	"Night and Day"		5:28
5.	"I'll See You Again"		6:37
6.	"Two Worlds Apart"		5:18
7.	"One Way"		5:21
8.	"Welcome to the Edge"		4:33
9.	"The Blue Line"		4:07
10.	"Dreamlove"		6:18
11.	"Wish You Were Around"		6:02
12.	"Theme from "The Edge" (Welcome to the Edge)"	Hughes; Seeman; Messinger	3:12

== Credits and personnel ==
Credits are adapted from liner notes of Welcome To The Edge (album)

- Produced and arranged by – Billie Hughes
  - Except: the song "Welcome to the Edge", track #1: arranged by Satoshi Kadokura
- Additional production assistance on vocals – Roxanne Seeman
- Photography (Back Cover) – Janis Nelson
- Art Direction – Masa Fukumoto
- Designed by: – Yumi Kohchi (Paper Land)
- Mastered at – Pony Canyon Inc.
- Mastering by – Kazuya Satoh
- All Instruments and programming performed by: Billie Hughes
  - Except: the song "Welcome To The Edge": Keyboards & Programming – Chuck Wild, Guitars – Jimmy Haun; the song "The Blue Line": Bass – Marcus Miller
- All songs recorded and mixed by – Billie Hughes, Glass Sea Studio
  - Except: the song "Welcome To The Edge": Tracking: Hollywild Studio; the song "The Blue Line": Vocals recorded and mixed by – Peter Lewis at One on One Recording

== Charts ==
=== Weekly charts ===
Chart (1991)	Peak position
Japan (Oricon)	17

== Cover versions ==
The song "Two Worlds Apart" was reworked and released by The Sisters of Mercy as "Under the Gun".
