= A Fool's Paradise =

Studio album by Lazarus
- Released: 1973
- Studio: A & R Recording, Bearsville Studios, Sound 80
- Genre: Folk; Rock
- Label: Bearsville Records
- Producer: Peter Yarrow; Phil Ramone

Lazarus chronology
| Lazarus (1971) | A Fool's Paradise (1973) |

Singles from A Fool's Paradise
- 1. "Ladyfriends I (Sing a Song to Your Lady)" Released: 1973

A Fool's Paradise is the second studio album by the American band Lazarus. It was released in January 1973 by Bearsville Records, distributed by Warner Bros. Records. All of the songs were written by Bill Hughes with the exception of "Oklahoma Boy" written by Carl Keesee. The album was produced by Peter Yarrow and Phil Ramone. It received significant national airplay on leading progressive FM stations.

"Ladyfriends I (Sing a Song to Your Lady)" was issued as the first single. It is included, with "Baby, Baby", in the Bearsville Bear Pack No 1 compilation of tracks considered collector's items released as a Vinyl LP by WEA, originating in the UK in 1977. The album featured Bobby Charles, Hungry Chuck, Paul Butterfield, Jesse Winchester and Lazarus.

The album was released by Pony Canyon in Japan on September 6, 1995. It was reissued by Rhino Records on CD and digitally.

== Critical reception ==
Holly Spence for the Lincoln Journal Star called the songs “soft easy rockers” describing the tunes as “harmonious” with “solid orchestrations” adding the “delivery and tunes are equally impressive”.

Billboard's Top Picks called the album “Beautifully done in every aspect, from fine songs, beautiful harmony vocals to superb instrumental arrangements.” Hughes and Keesee “have excellent voices” and “Hughes, who penned all the material, is a top writer.” The review commended the group for its ability “to combine rock and orchestral instruments without gimmicks and without sounding pretentious...condense its material so it doesn't drag,” and its authenticity, remarking “A bit of many styles but a copy of none.”

Walrus! rock music "tip sheet" wrote “Peter Yarrow’s influence is pervasive. The full, M.O.R. arrangements abound here as they do in his work." Cashbox reviewed the album among their Best Bets writing “a treat to hear from the trio any time particularly when they leave an LP like this one as a calling card” saying “one listen” is all that’s needed to know why Peter Yarrow, music director, got involved. The “tasteful selections” of Bill Hughes are praised for their range from “tender” to “catchy”, adding the songs “lend themselves well to the harmonies and arrangements and reflect a depth of feeling and imagination."

Record World called the album “A trio of exceptional harmonic ability” with “beautiful songs by Bill Hughes and lovely electric folk backgrounds” saying “Peter Yarrow has produced the gorgeous vocals with loving care, and super songs...will make for a long chart life for group."

== Track listing ==
All tracks are written by Bill Hughes, except where noted.

| No. | Title | Writer(s) | Length |
|---|---|---|---|
| 1. | "Ladyfriends II" | | 2:33 |
| 2. | "Ladyfriends I (Sing a Song to Your Lady)" | | 3:25 |
| 3. | "When Will the Home of Me Begin?" | | 3:20 |
| 4. | "A Fool's Paradise" | | 3:19 |
| 5. | "Baby, Baby" | | 2:26 |
| 6. | "Thoughts of You" | | 2:40 |
| 7. | "Take Me High" | | 2:48 |
| 8. | "Oklahoma Boy" | Carl Keesee | 3:48 |
| 9. | "This Is a Song" | | 3:25 |
| 10. | "Poets and Lovers" | | 4:29 |

== Credits and personnel ==
As listed in the liner notes.

Lazarus

- Bill Hughes – vocal, guitar, piano, harp
- Carl Keesee – vocal, bass
- Gary Dye – vocal, piano, organ

Production

- Phil Ramone – producer
- Peter Yarrow – producer
- Nick Jameson – drums, percussion
- Chris Dedrick – orchestration
- Peter Yarrow – musical director
- Phil Ramone – recording engineer
- Nick Jameson – additional production, remix
- Jim Maxwell and Susan Lee – special thanks
- Tom Zetterstrom - photography
- Tim Luft - design and illustration
- William C. Klein, Jr. – color tinting
