= Scene of the Crime (1986 film) =

- Theatrical release poster
- French: Le Lieu du crime
- Directed by: André Téchiné
- Written by: André Téchiné; Pascal Bonitzer; Olivier Assayas
- Produced by: Alain Terzian
- Starring: Catherine Deneuve; Danielle Darrieux; Wadeck Stanczak; Victor Lanoux
- Cinematography: Pascal Marti
- Edited by: Martine Giordano
- Music by: Philippe Sarde
- Production companies: T. Films; Films A2
- Distributed by: AMLF
- Release dates: 15 May 1986 (Cannes); 16 May 1986 (France)
- Running time: 90 minutes
- Country: France
- Language: French
- Box office: $5.6 million

Scene of the Crime (French: Le Lieu du crime) is a 1986 French crime drama film directed by André Téchiné, starring Catherine Deneuve, Danielle Darrieux, Wadeck Stanczak and Victor Lanoux. The film tells the story of a crumbling family in rural France, disrupted by the appearance of a fugitive.

== Plot ==
Thomas, a troubled thirteen-year-old boy, picking flowers in a cemetery, is surprised by Martin, an escaped convict who demands that the boy bring him some money for train fare later that day. The boy does not know where to get money; the criminal tells him to ask his parents. "My parents are dead," the boy says. In fact, his parents, Maurice and Lili, are alive. They are separated but they both live near the boy's grandparents' house. Thomas, disaffected by his parents divorce, goes to a Catholic boarding school but is spending the weekend with his family and he is going to have first communion. His grandmother is arranging to celebrate that special day and hopes her daughter and son in law would reconcile.

The boy tries to get the money for the convict stealing from Lili, his mother, but then sees her sad and, in a moment of love, gives it back to her, admitting what he's done. He goes through a series of increasingly desperate attempts to get money and eventually scrounges some out of his grumpy grandfather, who just wants to go fishing. When the boy returns to give Martin the money, the convict's accomplice, Luc, decides that the boy is too much of a liability and tries to kill him. Martin saves Thomas's life killing his accomplice.

Lili Ravenel, who is emotionally close and distant to her son, is worried about Thomas. He is not doing well at school, according to the school's chaplain who comes to complain about the boy's behavior. Lili, trapped in a humdrum existence, runs a nightclub that is situated on a river just at the water's edge. Pushed by her mother, she had married Maurice against her better judgment and now needs to escape the stifling effects of her union with him, but he continues to want her. Maurice threatens to remove the care and custody of her son from her. Lili has to perform her marital duties even after the divorce - while Maurice screens old home-movies of their domestic happiness long past and gone.

After killing Luc, Martin arrives to have a drink at a bar by a river. That is where Lili works. He has no money and at the end of the night, fascinated by the young man, she arranges for the fugitive to take a room at a local hotel. When she arrives home, her son tells her the story in the cemetery, as it was a dream he had, but she realizes that it actually happened and the convict is the man she just left in the hotel. The celebration in honor of the Holy Communion goes on with little family harmony after Thomas wishes that an atomic bomb would destroy his school. The grandmother tries to keep the family together.

Alice, the convicts' shared girlfriend comes, gun in hand, to help them escape to Tangier. They have been inseparable for years. Martin tells her that he was forced to kill Luc. Lili's suspicions are confirmed when she witnesses the efforts of Martin and Alice to hide the corpse in a graveyard. Martin lets her go and leaves the town with Alice. He changed his mind shortly after and returns to the village alone and goes to the bar in search of Lili. They are smitten by each other and by night, she takes the bold decision to run away with him without a hint of regret or lingering doubt. Before escaping with the convict, Lili tells her mother what she plans to do, but does not change her mind in spite of her mother's protests.

The boy's teacher and confessor confronts him with the published news of the two escapees and pressures him to tell the truth to the authorities. That same stormy night, Thomas escapes from the boarding school to see his mother, but when he arrives to her house, he discovers Lili and Martin making love. Thomas runs and when Martin goes after him, Alice who has also come, shoots Martin. Shortly after, Alice kills herself smashing her sport car against a wall.

The next morning Lili goes to see Thomas who is staying with his father, but Maurice only allows her to see him without revealing that she is there. Later, at the police station, Lili tells the truth and incriminates herself. She leaves the village detained in a police van. At the same time, Thomas is seen riding his bike.

== Cast ==
- Catherine Deneuve as Lili
- Wadeck Stanczak as Martin
- Nicholas Giraudi as Thomas
- Danielle Darrieux as Grandmother
- Victor Lanoux as Maurice
- Jean-Claude Adelin as Luc
- Jean Bousquet as Grandfather
- Claire Nebout as Alice

== Production ==
The film was shot along the Garonne river, straddling the Lot-et-Garonne and Tarn-et-Garonne departments, including in the villages of Clermont-Soubiran and Auvillar.

== Themes ==
The title is a bit misleading since Le Lieu du crime is not a noir thriller or a mystery. It is a family drama with psychological undertones. Director André Téchiné is especially drawn to the exploration of family affairs as can be seen in his acclaimed film: My Favorite Season (1993), also starring Catherine Deneuve.

The film shares with most of Téchiné's work a restless camera movement and seemingly casual editing that suggest a nervous, intense curiosity, equivalent to an artist's rapid sketching. The French countryside serves here as an ironic backdrop for two kinds of characters: those living repressed lives in a stifling bourgeois environment and those, more uninhibited, who play out a series of violent passions, with the boy caught in the middle. Téchiné's tight, emotionally suppressed, direction worked within the codes of melodrama. The film's two concerns are repression and freedom.

== Awards ==
The film was nominated for Palme d'Or at the 1986 Cannes Film Festival. In 1987 the film received a César Award nomination for Best Supporting Actress (Danielle Darrieux).
