= Welcome to the Edge =

1991 single by Billie Hughes

Single by Billie Hughes

from the album Welcome to the Edge
- B-side: "Night and Day"
- Released: May 15, 1991
- Recorded: 1991
- Studio: Glass Sea Studio
- Genre: Pop
- Length: 4:34
- Label: Pony Canyon
- Songwriters: Billie Hughes; Roxanne Seeman; Dominic Messinger
- Producers: Billie Hughes; Roxanne Seeman

Music video
- "Welcome To The Edge (Todokanu Omoi 「とどかぬ想い」)" on YouTube

"Welcome to the Edge" is a song by American singer-songwriter Billie Hughes, from his 1991 album of the same name. Written by Hughes, Roxanne Seeman, and Dominic Messinger, the single was released in Japan by Pony Canyon on May 15, 1991, under the title "Todokanu Omoi" (とどかぬ想い; lit. "One-Sided Love").

== Background ==
"Welcome to the Edge" was written by Hughes and Seeman with Messinger, music director and composer of the NBC soap opera Santa Barbara, after a previous song, "Turn it All Around", that Messinger had selected in 1988 to use in connection with a love triangle between the character Julia and Father Michael, became a popular love theme, prompting viewer requests. The song was connected to the character of Robert Barr. As the drama unfolded, "Welcome to the Edge" became a central love theme revolving around the Robert, Kelly Capwell, and Craig Hunt love triangle. Hughes' version was attached to the Robert and Kelly love affair while a female vocal version was attached to the Kelly and Craig Hunt love affair, with performances airing for two years.

"Welcome to the Edge" was nominated for Outstanding Original Song at the 18th Daytime Emmy Awards in 1991.

=== Commercial success in Japan ===
In 1990, the Japanese duo Wink recorded a version of "Welcome to the Edge" titled "Omoide made Soba ni Ite" (想い出までそばにいて; lit. "I'll Stay by Your Side Until You Remember"), which was the B-side of their single "Yoru ni Hagurete (Where Were You Last Night)". Hughes and Seeman produced a new version of the song using the arrangement of the Wink recording with Chuck Wild programming the track and recording Jimmy Haun's guitar section at Wild's Hollywild Studio. Hughes' vocals' were recorded over the track mix at Glass Sea Studios. The new version became the theme song of the Fuji TV drama I'll Never Love Anyone Anymore. The single hit No. 1 on Oricon's international singles chart and sold over 500,000 copies. Billboard journalist Kaz Fukatsu remarked: "That's an impressive figure, since most karaoke fans can't sing along in English. Five years ago, No. 1 international songs sold only about 40,000 copies."

"Welcome to the Edge" was awarded No. 1 International Single of the Year at the 1992 Japan Gold Disc Awards. Hughes performed the song live for the telecast in Tokyo.

== Track listing ==
8 cm CD
No.	Title	Writer(s)	Arrangement	Length
1.	"Welcome to the Edge" ("Todokanu Omoi" (とどかぬ想い; "One-Sided Love"))	Billie Hughes; Roxanne Seeman; Dominic Messinger	Satoshi Kadokura	4:34
2.	"Night and Day"	Hughes; Seeman	Hughes	5:29
Total length:				10:03

== Personnel ==
- Billie Hughes – vocals, keyboards (2), programming (2)
- Chuck Wild – keyboards (1), programming (1)
- Jimmy Haun – guitar (1)

== Chart performance ==
Country	Peak position
Japan Billboard	1
Japan Oricon International Singles	1

== Certification ==
Region	Certification	Certified units/sales
Japan (RIAJ)	4× Platinum	400,000^{^}
^{^} Shipments figures based on certification alone.

== Bon Chic version ==
"Todokanu Omoi"

Single by Bon Chic

from the album Bon Chic II
- Language: Japanese
- B-side: "Paradox"
- Released: May 29, 1991
- Recorded: 1991
- Genre: J-pop
- Length: 4:44
- Label: Hummingbird
- Composers: Billie Hughes; Roxanne Seeman; Dominic Messinger
- Lyricist: Ayuko Ishikawa

Bon Chic singles chronology
"Paradox" (1991)	"Todokanu Omoi" (1991)	"Cool Temptation" (1991)

Music video
- "Welcome To The Edge (とどかぬ想い)" on YouTube

Japanese band Bon Chic's version of "Welcome to the Edge" was released through Apollo Sounds Japan through the Hummingbird label on May 29, 1991. This version was used in the next episode announcement of episode 10 of I'll Never Love Anyone Anymore. A remix of the song, known as the "Add 909 Mix", was included in the band's second album Bon Chic II.

=== Track listing ===
All music is arranged by Dada.

8 cm CD
No.	Title	Lyrics	Music	Length
1.	""Todokanu Omoi" (とどかぬ想い; "One-Sided Love")"	Ayuko Ishikawa	Billie Hughes; Roxanne Seeman; Dominic Messinger	4:44
2.	"Paradox"	Venus Mameda	Monk	4:30

== Jeniffer version ==
"Welcome to the Edge"

Single by Jeniffer
- B-side: "Welcome to the Edge (Instrumental)"
- Released: November 6, 1991
- Recorded: 1991
- Genre: Pop
- Label: Toshiba EMI
- Songwriters: Billie Hughes; Roxanne Seeman; Dominic Messinger

Music video
- "Welcome to the Edge (Extended Version)" - Jeniffer on YouTube

Italian singer Jeniffer's version of "Welcome to the Edge" was released through Toshiba EMI on November 6, 1991.

=== Track listing ===
8 cm CD
No.	Title	Writer(s)	Length
1.	"Welcome to the Edge" ("Todokanu Omoi" (とどかぬ想い; "One-Sided Love"))	Billie Hughes; Roxanne Seeman; Dominic Messinger
2.	"Welcome to the Edge" (Instrumental)

== Other cover versions ==
=== Japan ===
- Wink covered the song in Japanese as "Omoide made Soba ni Ite" (想い出までそばにいて; lit. "I'll Stay by Your Side Until You Remember"), which was the B-side of their 1990 single "Yoru ni Hagurete (Where Were You Last Night)".
- Mie Yamamoto covered "Todokanu Omoi" on her 1991 debut album Sweet Love/Todokanu Omoi.
- The Nolans covered the song on their 1992 compilation album Colorful Nolans.
- Bill Champlin covered the song on the 1992 various artists album Love Stories.

=== Hong Kong ===
- Cherrie Choi covered the song in Cantonese as "Wèi nǐ de mèng lái, wèi nǐ de àishēng" (為你的夢來，為你的愛生, "Come for Your Dream, Live for Your Love") on her 1992 album Liù yuè de àirén (六月的愛人, Lover of June).
- Joyce Lee covered the song in Cantonese as "Qǐng Biǎo Tài" (請表態) on her 1992 album Lee Loksze (李樂詩, Joyce Lee).

=== Germany ===
Santa Barbara aired on RTL under the title California Clan, with a soundtrack album released by Intercord including a cover version of "Welcome to the Edge".

== See also ==
- List of best-selling singles in Japan
- Big in Japan
