= Dream Master (album) =

1979 album by Billie Hughes

Studio album by Billie Hughes
- Released: 1979
- Studios: A&M Studios, Hollywood; Sounds Interchange Studios, Canada; Total Sound West, Vancouver, British Columbia; Cherokee Studios, LA
- Genres: Soft rock; Folk rock
- Length: 33:09
- Label: Epic Records
- Producers: Henry Lewy; Billie Hughes; Dale Jacobs

Billie Hughes chronology
Dream Master (1979)	Welcome to the Edge (1991)

Dream Master is the debut studio album by American singer-songwriter Billie Hughes, released in 1979 on Epic Records by CBS Canada. Hughes composed all of the songs with "Stealin' My Heart Away" issued as the first single in 1979. The album was produced by Henry Lewy who held recording sessions at A&M Studios featuring Los Angeles session musicians Jeff Porcaro, Russ Kunkel, Victor Feldman, Wilton Felder, Mike Melvoin, and Mike Porcaro, Oscar Castro-Neves with a guest appearance by José Feliciano on guitar and background vocals.

The album was released in the US and internationally where in Japan, it received attention in the Osaka region, and Europe, in connection with the release of Hughes' Martin Eden single, appearing as the theme song of the Martin Eden mini-series, an Italian production broadcasting pan-Europe. In Germany, the album was released with Martin Eden opening the album, as a bonus track.

"Stealin' My Heart Away"

Single by Bill Hughes

from the album Dream Master
- Released: 1979
- Studio: A&M Studios
- Genre: Pop
- Length: 3:34
- Label: Epic Records
- Songwriter: Bill Hughes

Bill Hughes singles chronology
"Martin Eden" (1979)	"Stealin' My Heart Away" (1979)	"Welcome To The Edge" (1991)

The album was released on vinyl by Epic Records in 1979. It was re-released in Japan in 1982 when Billie Hughes moved to Japan for four months to perform in Osaka. Dream Master was re-released in Japan in CD format during the 1990s, after the success of Hughes' second solo album, Welcome to the Edge, and again in 2001.

== Background ==
After recording two albums with his band Lazarus in Woodstock and New York City, Hughes moved to Toronto where he played live performances. In 1978, he was signed by CBS Canada with plans to record an album in Los Angeles to be released on the Epic Records label. Hughes was given an open budget by CBS with his choice of record producer. Choosing Henry Lewy, who had produced Joni Mitchell, the Dream Master album was recorded at A&M Studios with Los Angeles session musicians Jeff Porcaro, Russ Kunkel, Victor Feldman, Wilton Felder, Mike Melvoin, and Mike Porcaro, Oscar Castro-Neves and a guest appearance by José Feliciano on guitar and background vocals. Once the album was completed and while Hughes was awaiting its release, he toured with The Anne Murray Show singing the duets and background vocals.

== Songs ==
José Feliciano appears on "Only Your Heart Can Say" on guitar and background vocals.

“Quiet Moment" was included on Shine, Mono Presents 70s Shine American Music Masterpiece Collection, released by Sony Music direct (Japan) in 2003, as track No. 8, alongside tracks by Eric Anderson, Tony Kosinec, Dan Fogelberg, Dave Mason, Ned Doheny, Fools Gold, Cecilio & Kapono, Les Dudek, Simon & Garfunkel, Livingston Taylor, Bob Dylan, Dane Donohue, Willie Nelson, Eric Gale, and James Taylor.

== Critical reception ==
Doreen Pitkeathly for The Hamilton Spectator called it “an expressive collection of ballads light rockers and soft pop tunes, all original” commenting that Billie Hughes has “always been a step ahead of the rest”.

Donald Langis for Le Courrier de la Nouvelle-Ecosse described the album as “a set of rhythmic songs that avoid falling into either easy-listening music (aka muzak) or hard rock.”

== Track listing ==
Dream Master
No.	Title	Length
1.	"Stealin' My Heart Away"	3:38
2.	"Dreams Come True"	3:29
3.	"Waiting For You To Fly"	3:31
4.	"Only Love"	3:00
5.	"Lower Lights"	2:54
6.	"Gypsy Lady"	3:42
7.	"Quiet Moment"	2:53
8.	"Catch Me Smilin'"	3:57
9.	"Only Your Heart Can Say"	3:36
10.	"Dream Master"	3:29
Total length:		33:09

== Personnel ==
Credits are adapted from liner notes of the Dream Master album.

(Note: the numbers below refer to the songs in the order of the tracking listing)

- Produced by – Henry Lewy
  - Except the song “Only Love”: produced by – Billie Hughes, the song “Catch Me Smilin’”: produced by – Dale Jacobs
- Carlton Lee – engineer
- Gary Lyons – remixing, engineer
- John Weaver – assistant engineer
- Joe Gastwirt and Jo Hansch – mastering
- Ian Freebairn-Smith – string, woodwind, horn arrangements, conductor
- Mike Melvoin (1, 2, 9, 10), piano
- Randy Kumano (4), piano
- Lincoln Mayorga (5), piano
- Doug Louie (8) – piano
- Mike Melvoin (3), piano
- Dale Jacobs (8) – electric piano
- Wilton Felder (1, 2, 3, 6, 7, 10), bass
- Allen Soberman (4), bass
- Joel Wade (8),
- Michael Porcaro (9) – bass
- Russ Kunkel (1), drums
- Jeffrey Porcaro (3, 6, 9, 10), drums
- John Dell (4), drums
- Rick Shlosser (7), drums
- Kat Hendrihse (8) – drums
- Will McFarland (1, 6), guitar
- Tony Peluso (2), guitar
- Mitch Holder (2, 3, 9, 10), guitar
- Jay Graydon (2, 7), guitar
- Terry Frewer (8),
- Brett Wade (8),
- José Feliciano (9) – electric guitar
- Billie Hughes (all tracks),
- Oscar Castro-Neves (7) – acoustic guitar
- Gary Lyons (1, 6), percussion
- Steve Foreman (2, 5, 9, 10),
- Victor Feldman (3, 7) – percussion
- Bill Hughes (3, 5, 7, 8, 9),
- Renee Armand (3, 10), background vocals
- Laura Creamer (3), background vocals
- Clark Burroughs (3, 7), background vocals
- Colleen Peterson (5, 10), background vocals
- Terry Frewer (8),
- Brett Wade (8),
- Joanie Taylor (8),
- José Feliciano (9), guitar, background vocals
- Venetta Fields (9), background vocals
- Sherlie Matthews (9), background vocals
- Paulette Brown (9), background vocals
- Ian Freebairn-Smith (10) – backing vocals
