= A Violent Life =

- Directed by: Giacomo Battiato
- Written by: Vittorio Bonicelli
- Starring: Wadeck Stanczak; Max von Sydow; Ennio Fantastichini; Pamela Villoresi; Ben Kingsley; Sophie Ward; Bernard-Pierre Donnadieu; Amanda Sandrelli
- Cinematography: Dante Spinotti
- Music by: Franco Battiato
- Release date: 1990
- Language: Italian

A Violent Life (Italian: Una vita scellerata, also known as Cellini: A Violent Life) is a 1990 Italian biographical drama film directed by Giacomo Battiato. It depicts real life events of goldsmith and sculptor Benvenuto Cellini.

== Cast ==
- Wadeck Stanczak as Benvenuto Cellini
- Max von Sydow as Pope Clement VII
- Ennio Fantastichini as Cosimo de' Medici
- Pamela Villoresi as Fiore
- Ben Kingsley as The Governor
- Sophie Ward as Sulpizia
- Bernard-Pierre Donnadieu as Francis I of France
- Amanda Sandrelli as Pantasilea
- Maurizio Donadoni as Rosso Fiorentino
- Tony Vogel as Baccio
- Lorenza Guerrieri as Faustina
- Florence Thomassin as Madame d'Estampes
