= Eastward (song) =

Single by The Lettermen

from the album Now and Forever
- B-side: "Some Came Running" (To Love and Be Loved)
- Released: 1974
- Genre: Folk; Rock
- Length: 2:58
- Label: Capitol
- Songwriter: Billie Hughes
- Producer: Lettermen

"Eastward" is a song written by Billie Hughes originally recorded in 1971 by Hughes' band Lazarus on their eponymous Lazarus album. American male pop vocal trio The Lettermen covered the song and released it as a single from the Lettermen album Now and Forever in 1974 on Capitol Records. The song was produced by the Lettermen and arranged and conducted by Vince Morton. It peaked at #16 on the Adult Contemporary Billboard chart. It was considered a notable Lettermen single.

== Background ==
"Eastward" was written by Billie Hughes and recorded by Hughes's band, Lazarus, on their 1971 self-titled debut album on Bearsville Records. It was produced by Peter Yarrow and Phil Ramone.

In 1968, Bob Engemann] of the Lettermen heard the Abilene Christian College group the ACCents while they were on a tour of the Southeast United States. All four members of the ACCents, including Bill Hughes, a sophomore, were singers and played instruments. Engemann asked for a tape, which they said they would finish the next semester.

While at ACC, Hughes formed his own band, Shiloh. They met Peter Yarrow after a Peter, Paul and Mary concert at a local venue and were signed to Bearsville Records as the band Lazarus, releasing their first album, Lazarus, with the song "Eastward", in 1971.

After years of success singing medleys of past hits, the Lettermen were seeking newly written songs to contemporize their sound and discourage being typecast as "middle-of-the-road". Lettermen covered Eastward, releasing it as a single in 1974. Radio and Records charted activity with commentary.

According to Letterman Tony Butala, they had changed their singing style from "straight block pattern... to using close harmony in tune." They sang fewer ballads and their soft tunes were still as breathy. They also dropped the "the" from the name of the group, calling themselves "Lettermen" on the new Now And Forever album and "Eastward" single.

== Composition and lyrics ==
"Eastward" is an acoustic ballad with vocal harmonies. The lyrics are inspirational.

== Critical reception ==
Neal Vitale, The Tech wrote: "Lazarus comes off as one of the freshest, most pleasant albums released in quite awhile. Such cuts as the truly beautiful... 'Eastward.'"

Billboard, in their Top Single Picks reviews, described: "an acoustic ballad whose harmonies sound as if they come from the Souther, Hillman, Furay/Fairport Convention school. By far their most commercial entry in years, and while the song should get its start in easy listening, there is no reason why it shouldn't cross into pop. Forget it's the Lettermen for a minute, and listen as if it were a new group".
