= Wadeck Stanczak =

French actor (born 1961)

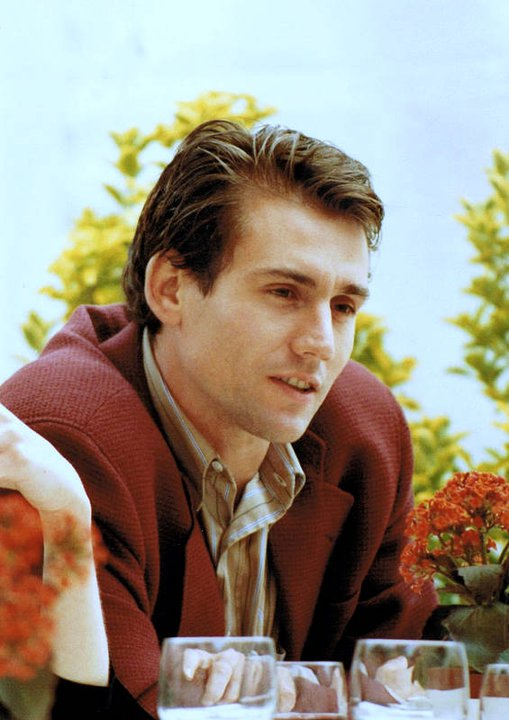
- Wadeck Stanczak at the 1991 Cannes Film Festival
- Born: 30 November 1961 (age 64); Arpajon, France
- Occupation: Actor
- Years active: 1984-present

Wadek Jean André Stanczak (born 30 November 1961) is a French actor. He appeared in more than thirty films since 1984. His parents were immigrants from Poland.

== Selected filmography ==
Film
Year	Title	Role	Director	Notes
1984	Les Cavaliers de l'orage	Ange	Gérard Vergez	
1985	Hors-la-loi	Christian	Robin Davis	
1985	Rendez-vous	Paulot	André Téchiné	
1986	Scene of the Crime	Martin	André Téchiné	
1986	Désordre	Yvan	Olivier Assayas	
1989	Chimère	Léo	Claire Devers	
1990	A Violent Life	Benvenuto Cellini	Giacomo Battiato	
1991	Mouche	—N/a	Marcel Carné	Incomplete
1992	The Return of Casanova	Lorenzi	Édouard Niermans	
1999	Furia	Laurence	Alexandre Aja	

== Awards ==
- César Award for Most Promising Actor (1985)
