= Martin Eden (1914 film) =

- Directed by: Hobart Bosworth
- Written by: Hobart Bosworth
- Based on: a novel Martin Eden by Jack London c.1909
- Produced by: Hobart Bosworth
- Cinematography: George W. Hill
- Distributed by: State Rights; W. W. Hodkinson
- Release date: August 16, 1914
- Running time: 50 minutes
- Country: United States
- Languages: Silent; English titles

Martin Eden is a 1914 silent film drama directed by Hobart Bosworth and starring Lawrence Peyton. It is based on the 1909 novel by Jack London.

== Cast ==
- Lawrence Peyton - Martin Eden
- Viola Barry - Ruth Morse
- Herbert Rawlinson - Arthur Morse
- Rhea Haines - Lizzie Connolly
- Ann Ivers - Maria Silva
- Ray Myers - Russ Brissenden
- Elmer Clifton - Cub reporter
- Hobart Bosworth
- Myrtle Stedman

== Preservation ==
An incomplete print of Martin Eden is held by the Library of Congress. The third and fourth reels of the film are considered lost.

== See also ==
- List of Paramount Pictures films
