= Bob McBride =

Canadian musical artist (1946–1998)

- Born: 17 November 1946; Toronto, Ontario, Canada
- Died: 20 February 1998 (aged 51) Toronto, Ontario, Canada
- Genres: Rock, Jazz fusion, Soft Rock
- Instruments: vocals, guitar
- Years active: 1970–1992
- Formerly of: Lighthouse

Robert Bruce McBride (17 November 1946 – 20 February 1998) was a Canadian rock singer-songwriter. He is best known as lead vocalist for the Canadian band Lighthouse. McBride has one Juno Award and two nominations.

In 2022, Lighthouse members Ralph Cole, Paul Hoffert, Bob McBride and Skip Prokop were honored at the 33rd SOCAN Awards and inducted into the Canadian Songwriters Hall of Fame.

== Early life and education ==
McBride was born in Toronto and graduated from North Toronto Collegiate Institute.

== Career ==
As a young man, McBride was part of Ronnie Hawkins' backup band for several years. He joined the band Lighthouse in 1970, replacing original singer Pinky Dauvin. His voice contributed to successful Lighthouse songs such as "Hats Off (To The Stranger)", "1849" and "One Fine Morning". He also won a 1973 Juno Award in the Outstanding Male Performance category and was nominated for 1974 Juno's in the Best Male Vocalist category, and as Male Vocalist of the Year.

In October 1972, while still a member of Lighthouse, McBride embarked on a solo career, signing a record deal with Capitol and releasing his debut album Butterfly Days. The album was both a critical and commercial success, going gold in Canada (selling over 50,000 copies) and spawning the hit singles "Pretty City Lady", "Treasure Song", and the title track.

In summer 1973, McBride officially parted ways with the band, some of whom were upset after he failed to appear for a New York recording session for the album Can You Feel It. Fellow member Skip Prokop sang the band's hit song "Pretty Lady" in his place, although Prokop said in an interview that McBride "could have done it bigger and better".

McBride continued his solo career, releasing the album Sea of Dreams in 1973. Although it was another critical success, the album was a commercial disappointment to Capitol and he was dropped from the label soon after. With the exception of some live dates around Southern Ontario with a backup band named "Magic", he all but disappeared from the music scene for a few years.

In 1976, McBride was allegedly approached to become the lead singer of Blood, Sweat & Tears, replacing David Clayton-Thomas. A few months later this was dismissed by Thomas' manager, Fred Heller, stating that this claim was "completely unfounded" and "Blood, Sweat & Tears with lead vocalist David Clayton-Thomas will perform with him fronting the band. Thomas also did all the lead vocals on the band's new album."

He returned with Here to Sing in March of 1978, with famed producer Jack Richardson. It generated more singles, and although the music's maturity was heralded by critics, none of the singles made the Top 40.

After landing a new recording deal with London Records, he returned to the studio that same year with a different backup band he dubbed "Expedition". A performance at that year's RPM (Radio Programming And Music) conference on November 18 resulted in his self-titled album, released in January 1979, which produced a handful of singles and yielded a minor hit with "Wild Eyes". McBride set out on the road and a series of dates throughout central Canada ensued into the following spring.

He reunited with many Lighthouse alumni in September, 1982 for a weekend of four concerts at Ontario Place, which drew 33,000 people; at the end of the weekend the musicians went their separate ways.

The band got together again in 1992 with a ten-member line-up, which included the founding members Prokop, Hoffert and Cole, with McBride on vocals. McBride had been addicted to heroin for over a decade, and the drug problems resulted in poor performances and erratic behaviour; by the end of the year he was once again gone from the band.

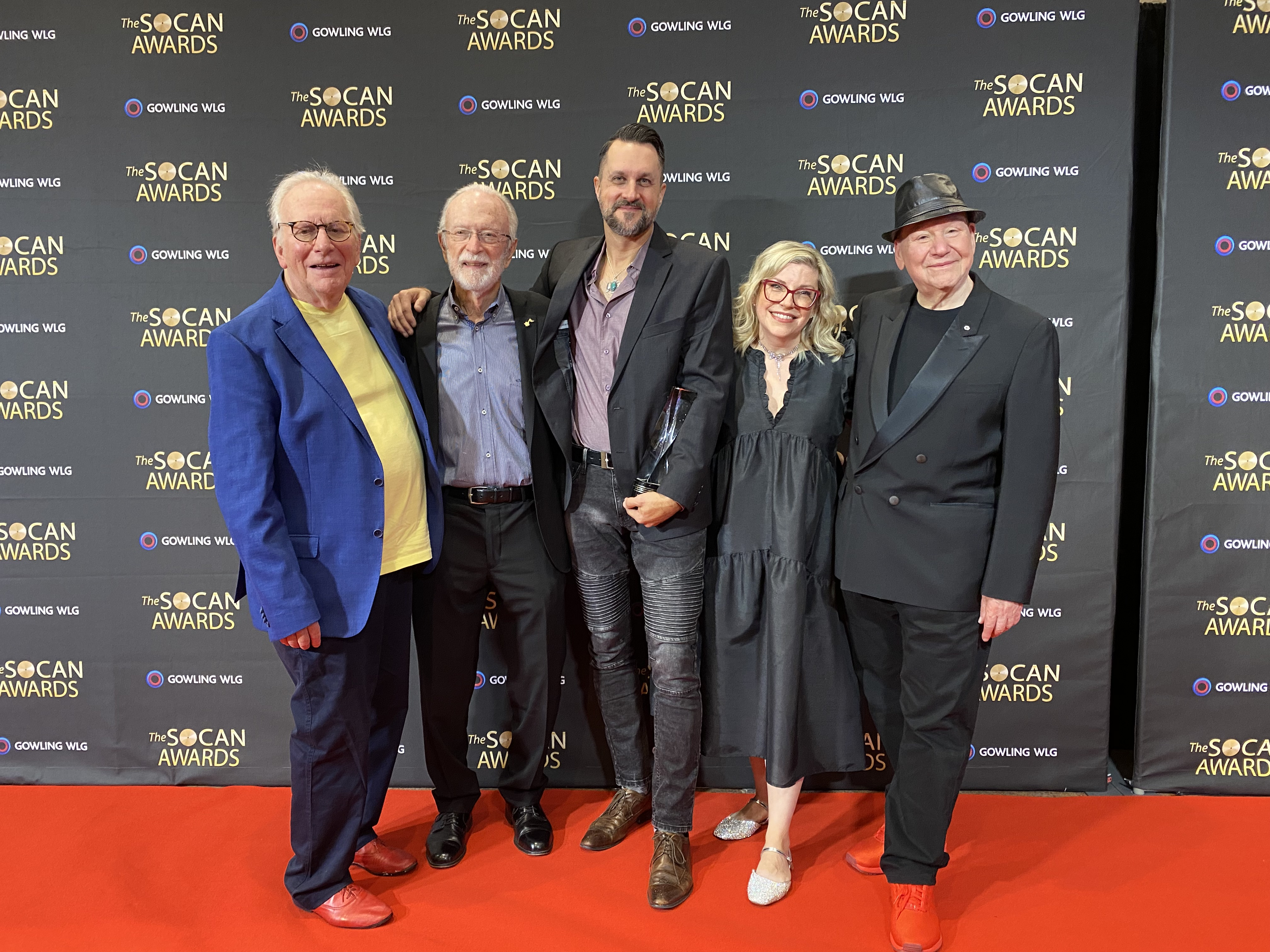
Ralph Cole, Ross Reynolds, Jamie Prokop (son of Skip Prokop), Lara McBride (daughter of Bob McBride) and Paul Hoffert on the red carpet at Lighthouse's induction into the Canadian Songwriters Hall of Fame

On October 17, 2022, McBride, along with his fellow Lighthouse members, was inducted into the Canadian Songwriters Hall of Fame. His daughter, Lara McBride, accepted on his behalf.

== Legal issues ==
In 1994, McBride was sentenced to 90 days in prison after he robbed an Ottawa drugstore twice for morphine. As part of his sentence, he organized two benefit concerts to raise awareness of the dangers of drugs. In 1996, he was charged with a 1992 jewelry theft. A 1996 trial was postponed due to his ill health. It continued in December 1997, a mistrial was declared, and McBride was scheduled to return to court in March 1998, but never returned due to his death in February 1998.

== Illness and death ==
After his departure from Lighthouse, McBride succumbed to a number of illnesses, including diabetes and Hepatitis B. He also received head injuries during a robbery at his parents' residence in 1996. He died in February 1998 at North York General Hospital in Toronto after heart failure and is buried at Westminster Memorial Gardens in Toronto.

Later in his life, McBride was married to Janice Fobert-Seaton, who died in 2003. one son was raised by them.

== Albums ==
Year	Album	Album details	Peak chart positions
Year	Album	Album details	CAN
1972	Butterfly Days	Released: November 1972 (Canada) / February 1973 (US); Label: Capitol/EMI	59
1973	Sea of Dreams	Released: December 1973; Label: Capitol/EMI	—
1978	Here to Sing	Released: March 1978; Label: MCA	—
1979	Bob McBride	Released: January 1979; Label: London	—
"—" denotes a recording that did not chart or was not released in that territory.

== Singles ==
Year	Name	Peak chart positions			Album
Year	Name	CAN	CAN AC	CANCON	Album
1973	"Pretty City Lady"	16	12	17	Butterfly Days
1973	"Butterfly Days"	77	—	94	Butterfly Days
1973	"Treasure Song"	39	30	x	Butterfly Days
1974	"Do It Right"	48	88	x	Sea of Dreams
1974	"Sea of Dreams"	—	—	x	Sea of Dreams
1976	"Seasons" / "Doin' It" (exclusive 45 only release)	—	—	x	Non-album single
1978	"Sail On Sailor (Through The Night)" / "White Sands"	—	—	x	Here to Sing
1978	"My World Is Empty Without You"	—	—	x	Here to Sing
1978	"Love Is A Four Letter Word"	—	—	x	Here to Sing
1979	"Wild Eyes"	—	47	x	Bob McBride
1979	"Hold On" / "Dancing 'Til Dawn"	—	—	x	Bob McBride
1979	"Roaring Twenties Queen"	—	—	x	Bob McBride
"—" denotes a recording that did not chart or was not released in that territory.
"x" denotes a recording that was not published in given chart.
