= Martin Eden (miniseries) =

Italian historical television series

- Film poster
- Created by: Giacomo Battiato
- Starring: Christopher Connelly; Delia Boccardo; Mimsy Farmer; Vittorio Mezzogiorno; Capucine
- Opening theme: "Martin Eden" performed by Bill Hughes
- Composer: Ruggero Cini
- Countries of origin: Italy; West Germany; Switzerland
- Original language: Italian
- No. of episodes: 5

Production
- Producer: Giulio Scanni
- Cinematography: Pasqualino De Santis
- Editor: Luigia Magrini
- Running time: 358 min.
- Production companies: RAI; R.T.R. - Realizzazione Telecinematografiche Roma; Tele-München; ZDF - Zweites Deutsches Fernsehen; Österreichischer Rundfunk-Fernsehen

Original release
- Release: November 25, 1979

Martin Eden is a 1979 5-episode Italian historical television series directed by Giacomo Battiato, based on the 1909 novel of the same name by Jack London. It broadcast from November 25, 1979 to December 23, 1979.

In Germany, it was first broadcast on Sunday, October 12, 1980 and the three following Sundays.

== Cast ==
- Christopher Connelly as Martin Eden
- Delia Boccardo as Ruth Morse
- Capucine as Mme Morse
- Mimsy Farmer as Lizzie Connoly
- Marino Campanaro as Arthur Morse
- Stanko Molnar as Benjamin
- Andréa Ferréol as Maria
- Russ Brissenden as Flavio Bucci
- Vittorio Mezzogiorno as Cheeseface
- Karl-Heinz Heitmann as Heermann Schmidt
- Livia Giampalmo as Cathy
- Wolfgang Soldati as Viney

== Production ==
Principal photography for the TV series took place in Italy. Christopher Connelly sailed in his schooner over the waves on Lake Como, not Alaska. He went looking for gold in Romania. The interior shots were taken in Rome.

== Martin Eden soundtrack ==
The Martin Eden theme song is performed by Billie Hughes. It is the vocal version of the composers’ theme, with music written by Italian composers Ruggero Cini and Dario Farina and lyrics by Bill Hughes.

Martin Eden was released as a single in Europe by CBS. The song charted in several territories.
