= I'll Never Love Anyone Anymore =

- Mou Daremo Aisanai もう誰も愛さない
- Genre: TV Drama; Roller Coaster Drama
- Created by: Masahiro Yoshimoto; Zhongshan乃莉Ko; Masato Hayashi
- Starring: Eisaku Yoshida; Minako Tanaka; Tomoko Yamaguchi
- Ending theme: Welcome to the Edge ("Todokanu Omoi” とどかぬ想い (One-Sided Love)) performed by Billie Hughes
- Composer: Daisuke Iwasaki
- Country of origin: Japan
- Original language: Japanese
- No. of seasons: 1
- No. of episodes: 12

Production
- Producers: Yuzo Abe; Toyohiko Wada
- Running time: 54 minutes
- Production company: Fuji Television Network, Inc.

Original release
- Release: April 11 – June 27, 1991

I'll Never Love Anyone Anymore with the Japanese title “Mou Daremo Aisanai” (もう誰も愛さない) is a 1991 Japanese TV drama broadcast every Thursday from April 11 – June 27 from 10:00pm to 10:54pm on Fuji TV’s “Thursday Theatre” programming format. It was directed by Yasuyuki Kusada, Hiroshi Akabane and Satoru Nakajima. Eisaku Yoshida plays the lead character.

The 12 episode TV drama began rebroadcasting on October 8, 2019 on TVK (Television Kanagawa), a local Japanese station located in Kanagawa, in the Greater Tokyo Area.

The 12 episode series rebroadcast in 2019.

== Cast ==
- Eisaku Yoshida
- Minako Tanaka
- Tomoko Yamaguchi
- Alisa Mizuki
- Takuro Tatsumi
- Reiko Kato
- Kazue Itō
- Noboru Nakaya
- Masato Ibu
- Kyoko Enami
- Hirohide Yakumaru

== Production ==
- Planning- Akifumi Takuma, Kenji Shimizu
- Screenplay - Masahiro Yoshimoto, Zhongshan 乃莉 Ko, Masato Hayashi
- Composer - Daisuke Iwasaki
- Director- Yasuyuki Kusuda, Hiroshi Akabane, Satoru Nakajima
- Theme Song - Billie Hughes "Welcome to the Edge ("Todokanu Omoi” とどかぬ想い (One-Sided Love))"
- Insert Song - Randy Crawford "Almaz known as "Sweet Love"

In the announcement after the end of the 9th episode and the 10th episode, Mie Yamamoto 's "Sweet Love" (Japanese cover of the inserted song), and in the announcement after the 10th episode, BON CHIC 's "Don't Feel" (Japanese cover of the theme song, "Welcome to the Edge ("Todokanu Omoi” とどかぬ想い (One-Sided Love))"") was used.

- Technical cooperation- Higashidori, Shibuya Video Studio
- Art cooperation- Fuji Art
- Producers - Yuzo Abe, Toyohiko Wada
- Production - Fuji TV, AVEC

== Overview ==
The crime series was named “Roller Coaster Drama” because of the quick progression of the story and the unpredictable element of suspense. The concept and drama was so popular that the same creative team produced "I can't see only you" (1992) and "I can't show tears anymore" (1993), making "Mou Daremo Aisainai" (もう誰も愛さない) the first of the "Roller Coaster Drama trilogy". “Roller Coaster Drama” became known as a genre.
