= Paul Stookey =

American singer-songwriter (born 1937)

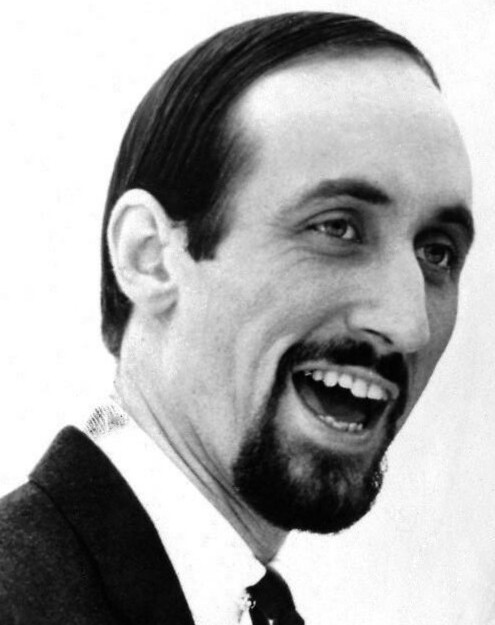
- Stookey in 1970

Background information
- Born: Noel Paul Stookey; December 30, 1937 (age 88); Baltimore, Maryland, U.S.
- Genres: Folk
- Occupation: Singer-songwriter
- Instruments: Vocals; guitar
- Years active: 1950s–present
- Label: Warner Brothers-Neworld Multimedia
- Formerly of: Peter, Paul and Mary; Peter and Noel Paul
- Spouse: Elizabeth Bannard (m. 1963)
- Website: noelpaulstookey.com

Noel Paul Stookey (born December 30, 1937) is an American singer-songwriter and activist who is known for being a member of the 1960s folk trio Peter, Paul and Mary along with Peter Yarrow and Mary Travers. Following the deaths of Travers in 2009 and Yarrow in 2025, Stookey is the sole surviving member of the group. He continues to work as a solo artist and an activist.

== Early life ==
Stookey was born in Baltimore, Maryland. His family moved to Birmingham, Michigan, when he was 12 years old, and he graduated from Birmingham High School (now Seaholm High School) in 1955.

Stookey attended Michigan State University (MSU) in East Lansing, Michigan but did not graduate. While attending MSU, he joined Delta Upsilon fraternity. Though he credits a deep spiritual core for his work, Stookey "dispelled reports that he was born a Buddhist, saying his mother was a Roman Catholic and his dad was an ex-Mormon" and recalling the family's "eclectic attendance at church. I had no real spiritual sense until I was 30."

== Personal life ==
Stookey married Elizabeth "Betty" Bannard in 1963 and they have three daughters. After raising their family in Blue Hill, Maine, the couple lived for several years in Massachusetts while Betty served as the Northfield Mount Hermon School chaplain and they returned to Maine in 2005. Stookey continued recording his solo albums in his private studio—a converted four-story henhouse—on his Maine property. This studio, known as "The Henhouse," was also the origin point of the first broadcasts of WERU upon that station's inception in 1988.

== Music career ==
=== Peter, Paul and Mary ===
Performing as Paul in the Peter, Paul and Mary trio, he participated in one of the best-known ensembles of the 1960s phase of the American folk music revival, and included some of his solo songs and extended monologs in their performances and recordings. In May 1963, Stookey discussed the evolution of his music and the formation of Peter, Paul and Mary on Folk Music Worldwide, an international short-wave radio program in New York City.

One of Stookey's songs, "Norman Normal", which appeared on The Peter, Paul and Mary Album (1966), inspired a Warner Bros. animated cartoon also titled Norman Normal (1968). Stookey co-wrote the story for the cartoon and voiced several of the characters.

In addition to his recordings with the trio, he released a number of solo works, several albums with the ensemble Bodyworks, and some anthologies. He was an important artist in the young Jesus music movement, which later bloomed into the Christian music industry, although his generally liberal political views distinguish him from many such artists.

Stookey was awarded the Kate Wolf Memorial Award by the World Folk Music Association in 2000.

=== Solo career ===
During 1971 and 1972 Warner released a debut solo album by each member of the group. Each of these had similarly styled cover art. Stookey's album Paul and was the highest of the three on the music charts, reaching number 42 on the Billboard 200 chart in the United States in September 1971 and number 51 in Canada.

In 1973, Stookey performed at Carnegie Hall and released the concert as his second solo album calling it One Night Stand. With the release of One Night Stand, Stookey changed his name from Noel Paul Stookey to Paul Stookey.

Stookey's best-known song "The Wedding Song (There Is Love)" was included on his debut solo album. The song was also released as a single which reached number 24 in the Billboard Hot 100. He wrote the song as a wedding gift for Peter Yarrow, and refused to perform it for the public until Yarrow requested it at a concert where his wife was present. Stookey assigned the copyright of this song to the Public Domain Foundation (PDF), a nonprofit 501(c)(3).

=== After Peter, Paul and Mary ===
Stookey performed as a member of Peter, Paul and Mary until the death of Mary Travers in September 2009. His work after Peter, Paul and Mary has emphasized his faith, family life and social concerns. He remains active in the music industry, performing as a solo act, and occasionally performed with the late Peter Yarrow.

In 1986, Stookey teamed up with Jim Newton, Paul G. Hill, and Denny Bouchard at Celebration Shop in Texas. The company, now known as Kidlinks, uses original musical compositions as music therapy to address the special needs of children. The company has produced three award-winning children's CDs used in hospitals, medical camps and homes across the country.

In 2000 Noel and his daughter, Elizabeth Stookey Sunde, founded the nonprofit Music to Life, which builds on the strong historical legacy of social movements' intentional use of music to educate, recruit, and mobilize.

In January 2011, centered on Martin Luther King Jr. Day, Stookey participated in several events at Dartmouth College that celebrated King's life, including "Music for Social Change with Noel Paul Stookey and Company."

=== Production ===
He also has production credits on a wide range of albums including jazz saxophonist Paul Winter, comedian Tim Sample and several singer-songwriters, among them Dave Mallett, Michael Kelly Blanchard and Gordon Bok. He was the founder of the Neworld Multimedia record label.

== Discography ==
=== Albums ===
Year	Title	Record label
2022	Fazz:Now&Then	Neworld Multimedia
2021	Just Causes	Neworld Multimedia
2018	Somethin' Special – A Noel Paul Stookey Holiday Recollection	Neworld Multimedia
2017	Summerfallwinterspring (four-song EP)	Neworld Multimedia
2015	At Home: The Maine Tour (DVD and CD)	Neworld Multimedia
2012	The Cabin Fever Waltz (EP with the Bangor Symphony Orchestra)	Neworld Multimedia
2012	One & Many	Neworld Multimedia
2012	Cue the Moon (digital download EP)	Neworld Multimedia
2012	Capricious Bird (digital download EP)	Neworld Multimedia
2012	One Voice and One Guitar (digital download EP)	Neworld Multimedia
2007	Facets	Neworld Multimedia
2004	Virtual Party	Neworld Multimedia
2002	Circuit Rider (A Noel Paul Stookey / Bodyworks compilation)	Neworld Multimedia
2001	There Is Love (A Holiday Music Celebration) with Michael Kelly Blanchard	Neworld Multimedia
1990	In Love Beyond Our Lives (Noel Paul Stookey/ Bodyworks)	Gold Castle
1985	State of the Heart (Noel Paul Stookey/ Bodyworks)	Newpax
1984	There Is Love (A Noel Paul Stookey Anthology)	Newpax
1982	Wait'll You Hear This (Noel Paul Stookey/ Bodyworks)	Newpax
1979	Band & Bodyworks (Noel Paul Stookey/ Bodyworks)	Neworld
1977	Something New and Fresh	Neworld
1977	Real to Reel	Neworld
1973	One Night Stand	Warner Bros.
1971	Paul And (Released August 16, 1971)	Warner Bros
1954	The Birds Fly Home (The Birds of Paradise, Stookey's high school band)	Independent release

=== Singles ===
Release date	Title	Peak chart positions			
Release date	Title	US	US (AC)	CAN (Top 100)	CAN (AC)
July 31, 1971	"Wedding Song (There Is Love)"	24	3	31	12
