= Wedding Song (There Is Love) =

1971 hit song by American singer-songwriter Paul Stookey

"Wedding Song (There Is Love)" is a title of a 1971 hit single by Paul Stookey. The song, which Stookey credits to divine inspiration, has since been recorded by many singers (with versions by Petula Clark and Mary MacGregor returning it to the Billboard Hot 100) and remains a popular choice for performance at weddings.

== Composition and original recording ==
Stookey had first performed the song at the wedding of Peter Yarrow—Stookey's co-member of Peter, Paul and Mary—to Mary Beth McCarthy at Saint Mary's Catholic Church in Willmar, Minnesota. Stookey was best man at the ceremony, which took place in the evening of October 18, 1969.

Stookey recorded "Wedding Song (There Is Love)" for his solo album Paul and, which was released on July 23, 1971. On this track he accompanied himself on a 12-string guitar tuned a tone and a half down. On June 28, 1971, "Wedding Song" was issued as an advance single from the Paul and album. It reached No. 24 on the Hot 100 in Billboard and reached No. 3 on the Easy Listening chart. Internationally, Stookey reached No. 31 and No. 12 (AC) in Canada, and No. 55 in Australia with "Wedding Song".

== Petula Clark version ==
"Wedding Song (There Is Love)"

Single by Petula Clark

from the album Now
- B-side: "Song Without End" US/UK "My Guy" Australia
- Released: September 1972 US; October 1972 Australia/UK
- Recorded: July 1972
- Studio: Trident (London, UK)
- Genre: Easy listening
- Length: 3:14
- Label: MGM US; PolydorAustralia/UK
- Songwriter: Noel Paul Stookey
- Producers: Mike Curb, Don Costa

Petula Clark US singles chronology
"My Guy" (1972)	"Wedding Song (There Is Love)" (1972)	""I Can't Remember (How It Was Before)""

Petula Clark UK singles chronology
"I Don't Know How to Love Him" (1971)	""Wedding Song (There Is Love)"" (1972)	""I Can't Remember (How It Was Before)""

Petula Clark Australian singles chronology
"The World Song" (1971)	"Wedding Song" (1972)	"(Let The Love Light In Your Eyes) Lead Me On" (1973)

Petula Clark recorded "Wedding Song (There Is Love)" in the August 1972 sessions at Trident Studios in London for her album Now produced by Mike Curb with the album's arranger Don Costa. "Wedding Song..." was issued in September 1972 as the second advance single from the Now album which would be a December 1972 release: "Wedding Song..." would chart at No. 9 on the Adult contemporary music charts and reached No. 65 on the Billboard Hot 100.

In the UK "Wedding Song (There Is Love)" had an October 6, 1972 single release, being Clark's first UK single release since "I Don't Know How to Love Him" in November 1971. "Wedding Song..." did not enter the UK singles chart despite being aired on October 26, 1972 Top of the Pops broadcast.

In Canada the song reached No. 67. "Wedding Song (There Is Love)" afforded Clark a major hit in Australia in the spring of 1973, spending 11 weeks in the Top 20 with a peak of No. 10. Clark also recorded a French rendering of "Wedding Song (There Is Love)" entitled "Il est temps", featuring lyrics by Pierre Delanoë: this version was issued as the B-side of Clark's December 1972 French single release "Bleu, Blanc, Rouge" and was included on Clark's 1973 francophone album Petula.

The 2002 DVD release Petula Clark: A Sign of the Times which features footage from Clark's performance at the Virginia Arts Festival May 20–21, 2001, includes her performance of "The Wedding Song (There Is Love)" (so entitled).

== Other versions ==
Prior to the release of the Petula Clark version, Southern Comfort had recorded "Wedding Song (There Is Love)" for their 1972 album Stir Don't Shake from which it was issued as a single in August 1972.

The song became a Top Ten hit in Ireland via the May 1974 release credited to the veteran showband Kelley and the Nevada, fronted by vocalist Eileen Kelley. The single reached No. 3 on the Irish hit parade dated July 11, 1974. This was the Nevada's second hit version of a Petula Clark US charting single - Red Hurley and the Nevada scored a 1971 Irish No. 1 hit with a remake of Clark's 1968 US Top 20 hit "Kiss Me Goodbye". "The Wedding Song" was the second and final chart single by the Nevada fronted by Kelley—subsequent to the band's version of "How Great Thou Art" (No. 8 in 1972) and was the fourth and final collaboration between Kelley and the Nevada.

Captain & Tennille recorded the song for their 1976 album Song of Joy. "Wedding Song" was intended to be issued as the fourth single from the album and would have followed up the 1976-77 Top 10 hit "Muskrat Love". A&M Records had gone as far as assigning a catalog number (A&M 1894) for the track's single release when it was canceled. The song was instead used as the B-side to the album's fourth single, "Song of Joy", which did not chart.

"The Wedding Song (There Is Love)" returned to the Billboard charts in the autumn of 1978 via a version by Mary MacGregor which reached No. 23 Easy Listening and No. 81 on the Hot 100. MacGregor had been discovered by Peter Yarrow, whose wedding occasioned the song's composition, but Yarrow was not involved in MacGregor's recording of "The Wedding Song", which was produced by Gene Cotton and recorded at the Creative Workshop studio in Berry Hill, Tennessee. The Mary MacGregor version made its album debut on the 1979 release Mary MacGregor's Greatest Hits.

Other versions of the song have been recorded by Harry Belafonte (album Belafonte...Live! (1972)), the Lettermen (album Close to You (1971)), Helena Vondráčková (as "Je teď tvá" Czech - album Helena a Stryci (1974)), Nana Mouskouri (album Nana's Book of Songs (1975)), Daliah Lavi (as "Liebe Lebt" German - album Neuer Wind (1976)), Bonnie St. Claire (as "'K Hou Van Jou" Dutch - album Sla Je Arm Om Me Heen (1983)) and Sandler and Young (album You've Got a Friend in...).

Two versions with lyrics have been recorded by James Last (albums Love Must Be the Reason (1972), Beachparty 3 (1972) and James Last Live (1974) (2 LP-album)).

Instrumental versions have been recorded by the O'Neill Brothers (album A Day to Remember: Instrumental Music for Your Wedding Day (2002)) and Bradley Joseph (album Piano Love Songs (2006)).
