= Ruggero Cini =

Italian composer, producer, arranger and conductor

- Born: 30 November 1933; Scandicci, Italy
- Died: 8 April 1981 (aged 47); Rome, Italy
- Occupation: Musician

Ruggero Cini (30 November 1933 – 8 April 1981) was an Italian composer, producer, arranger and conductor.

== Life and career ==
Born in Scandicci, Cini started his career in the second half of the 1960s, collaborating as arranger with several artists of RCA Italiana, notably Luigi Tenco, The Rokes, Fred Bongusto and Dino. He debuted as composer in 1967, with the song "Bisogna saper perdere", presented at the 17th edition of the Sanremo Music Festival by Lucio Dalla and The Rokes.

In 1968 Cini got his major hit with the Patty Pravo's song "La Bambola". In the following years he collaborated intensively with Lucio Dalla and Renato Zero, and had some experiences as a film composer, scoring films such as The Three Fantastic Supermen (1967), Open Season (1974), and Martin Eden (1979).
