= Giacomo Battiato =

Italian film director and writer

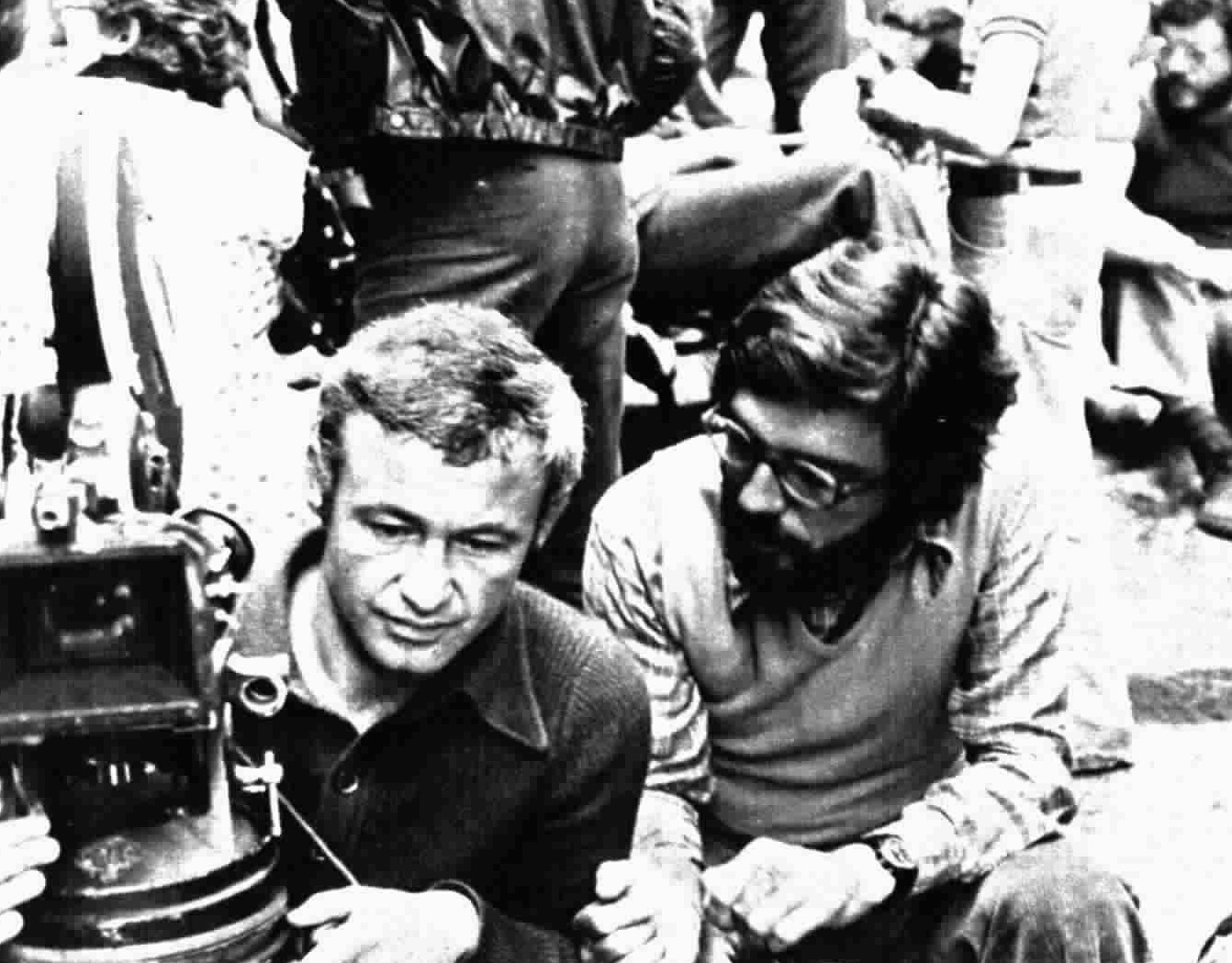
- Giacomo Battiato (right) with cinematographer Giorgio Urbinelli
- Born: October 18, 1943 (age 83); Verona, Italy
- Occupations: Film director, writer

Giacomo Battiato (born 18 October 1943 in Verona) is an Italian film director and writer.

One guide to Italian cinema says he:

...is one of the most erudite and flexible directors of his generation. A cultural organizer, he has also written novels interesting for both their calibre and writing style. He got his start as an excellent television director, an experience that allowed him to develop his talents though his varied experiences before he made his debut as a film director.... Battiato is skilled at genre films and ably exploiting the technical aspects of filmmaking. Magic, visual wonderment and mythology are important elements in his films. His characters' psychological profiles were convincing even within the context of his epic and action films....

Born in Verona and married to Anna Zaneva since 1999, he began his career in 1973 on Italian RAI TV and ten years later started in cinema with I paladini. His first book, Fuori dal cielo (1996), won the Prize Domenico Rea. He directed two non-fiction films about Pope John Paul II: Karol: A Man Who Became Pope (Karol, un uomo diventato Papa) in 2005 and Karol: The Pope, The Man (Karol, un papa rimasto uomo) in 2006.

He has staged several operas, including Verdi's Simon Boccanegra in Stuttgart, Germany, and Mozart's Così fan tutte in Naples, Italy. He has also directed special programmes and documentaries, including: Expressionismus, which won the MIFED (Mercato internazionale del film e del documentario) Gran Prix; a portrait of Pierre Boulez; a film on Italian Design for the Museum of Modern Art, New York. He won the Prix UNESCO at the International Festival of Art Film in Paris in 1993.

He has also directed award-winning commercials. Such prizes include the One Show Gold Award from the Art Directors Club of New York, the Andy Award of Excellence from the Advertising Club in New York, and the Lion d'Or at 20th Cannes International Advertising Film Festival. He has taught courses in film direction at the National School of Cinema in Rome.

== Filmography ==
- Dentro la casa della vecchia signora (1973 TV movie)
- Il marsigliese (1975), starring Marc Porel, Lina Polito and Vittorio Mezzogiorno. Won Best Thriller at the Cattolica Film Festival and Best Director at the Chianciano Film Festival.
- A Classy Crime (1977 TV movie)
- Il giorno dei cristalli (1978 TV movie)
- Martin Eden (1979 TV movie), adapted from Jack London's novel of the same name, starring Christopher Connelly, Capucine and Vittorio Mezzogiorno
- Colomba (1981 TV movie), adapted from Prosper Mérimée's novella of the same name, starring Anne Canovas and Alain Cuny. Won the Flaiano Award for Best Screenplay
- Hearts and Armour (1983), for Warner Brothers.
- Blood Ties (1986), starring Brad Davis, Vincent Spano and Michael Gazzo. Named best TV Movie at the 43rd Venice Film Festival; nominated for the Emmy Award for Best Actor (Vincent Spano).
- Stradivari (1989), starring Anthony Quinn, Valerie Kaprinski and Stefania Sandrelli.
- A Violent Life (1990), starring Wadeck Stanczak, Max von Sydow, Ben Kingsley. Won the Golden Ephebus Award.
- Diary of a Rapist (1995), starring Roberto Zibetti and Isabella Ferrari. Invited to the Berlin, Moscow, Montreal and Stockholm International Film Festivals.
- La piovra, season 8 (TV) (1997). Won the Critics Award and the Golden Nymph for Best Fiction at the Montecarlo TV International Festival.
- La piovra, season 9 (TV) (1998)
- The Young Casanova (TV) (2001), starring Stefano Accorsi, Thierry Lhermitte, Katja Flint, François Berléand. Won the Silver Fipa at the Biarritz International Festival.
- Entrusted (TV) (2003), starring Klaus Maria Brandauer, Giovanna Mezzogiorno, and Thomas Sangster. Won Best Actor (Thomas Sangster) at the Montecarlo Festival.
- Karol, A Man Who Became Pope (TV) (2005), starring Piotr Adamczyk, Malgosia Bela, Matt Craven, Michele Placido. Won the Golden Ephebus Award.
- Karol, The Pope, The Man (TV) (2006)
- Resolution 819 (2008), starring Benoît Magimel, Karolina Gruszka, Hippolyte Girardot. Won the Golden Marcus Aurelius award for best film at the Rome International Film Festival 2008; won the European Prize from the French Senate; the François Chalais Prize for Best Film and Best Director; won the Student's Choice Award at the Amnesty International's Movies that Matter Festival at The Hague.
- The Lying Game (L'Infiltré) (2010), starring Jacques Gamblin, Mehdi Dehbi. Won the Silver Fipa at the Biarritz Film Festival for Best Film and the Golden Fipa at the Biarritz Film Festival for Best Actor (Mehdi Dehbi).
- Max e Hélène (2015) starring Alessandro Averone, Carolina Crescentini
- The Name of the Rose (2019 miniseries) starring John Turturro, Rupert Everett, Michael Emerson, James Cosmo

== Publications ==
Editor

- Anthology of the European Poetry and Literature at the turn of the century (Milan: Mazzotta)

Novels

- Fuori dal cielo (Out of heaven). Won the Rea Award and the First Novel Award
- L'amore nel palmo della mano (Love in the palm of the hand) (Mondadori) in Italy
- 39 Colpi di pugnale (39 strikes of a dagger) (Gaffi, 2010)
