= Lazarus (band) =

American Christian rock band

- Origin: Abilene, Texas, U.S.
- Genres: Folk, soft rock, Contemporary Christian, pop
- Years active: 1969–1976
- Labels: Bearsville, Rhino, Warner Bros.
- Members: Billie Hughes; Carl Keesee; Gary Dye

Lazarus were a 1970s American soft rock band, consisting of principal members Billie Hughes, Gary Dye, and Carl Keesee. Hughes was the leader of the band, serving as lead singer and songwriter, and playing guitar and violin. The band are considered early artists in the Contemporary Christian movement.

== Background ==
The band members of Lazarus met in 1968 in Abilene, Texas, while Hughes and Keesee were attending Abilene Christian College. Hughes, Keesee and Gary Dye formed a band, initially named Shiloh. At a Peter, Paul & Mary concert March 20, 1968, at the ACC Moody Coliseum Auditorium, they were able to meet Peter Yarrow backstage and play him their demo tape. Lazarus returned to Abilene, Texas to appear with Peter Yarrow in his concert at the Abilene Civic Center in April 1972.

In association with Yarrow and producer Phil Ramone, Lazarus moved to Peter Yarrow's cabin in Woodstock, N.Y., signing with the newly formed Bearsville Records (Warner Bros.) label, under the direction of Albert Grossman.

== Releases ==
Lazarus released two albums, the self-titled Lazarus, and A Fool's Paradise on Bearsville Records, both produced by Peter Yarrow and Phil Ramone. The band won a Clio Award for Best Commercial of the Year for the Life Savers campaign.

The self-titled debut album Lazarus was the second album released on the Bearsville label. On the album's release, RPM wrote about the band: "A find of PP&M's Peter Yarrow, Lazarus is a highly talented folkish trio very much in the strain of Crosby, Stills et al. Group has a quality of presence, unsurpassed.

April 1972, a launch celebration in London with Albert Grossman in attendance, was hosted by Kinney (WEA), set to distribute the Bearsville label in the UK, with initial album releases by Todd Rundgren, Lazarus and Foghat.

Released in 1971, this first album featured the single "Warmth of Your Eyes," which became a moderate hit the following year. Their second and final album, A Fool's Paradise, followed in 1973, from which "Ladyfriends I (Sing a Song to Your Lady)" was tagged as a single. Both albums were produced by Yarrow and Phil Ramone.

== Touring ==
Lazarus played The Troubadour, Los Angeles, toured with Peter Yarrow, and over the next four years, performed extensively throughout the United States and Canada. In a review of The Troubadour show, Eliot Tiegel wrote: "This is a totally enjoyable twin bill which is touring the country...Lazarus showed off a fine harmonic ability with its three members holding their voices in line and also performing adequately on piano/organ, guitar/violin and bass."

Lazarus was represented by the booking agency East-West Talent, Inc. who also represented The Band, Paul Butterfield, Foghat, Hello People, and Todd Rundgren. They opened for Rundgren at his USD concert in Vermillion, South Dakota, a city that Rundgren name-checks on his Back to the Bars live album.

In a review of a Toronto show, RPM wrote: “When Carl Keesee/bass, Gary Dye/piano and Bill Hughes/guitar & violin, blend their voices together the resulting sound is supreme harmony…their songs are full of love, happiness and peace, and they give an overall tranquil feeling when they play.”

== Life Savers commercial ==
In 1976, the band won the Clio Award for Life Savers Best Commercial of the Year. The "Life Savers" TV commercial with the song written and performed by the band Lazarus ran nine years nationwide. The commercial starred Peter Billingsley and Suzanne Somers in different versions of the commercial, respectively.

== Solo careers ==
Following Lazarus' disbandment, Hughes went on to pursue a solo career and later formed a successful songwriting partnership with Roxanne Seeman.

Carl Keesee went to Canada to play a gig and remained there.

"Ladyfriends" from A Fool's Paradise was included in the Bearsville Anthology released in 2006.
