= Carl Keesee =

- Born: 1947 or 1948 (age 76–77); Oklahoma, United States
- Genres: Folk music, soft rock
- Occupation: Bassist
- Instrument(s): Vocals, bass guitar, clarinet
- Years active: 1968 - present

Carl Keesee is an American recording artist, songwriter, and musician. He is best known as a bassist and member of the band Lazarus with Bill Hughes and Gary Dye, produced by Peter Yarrow and Phil Ramone and signed by Albert Grossman to Bearsville Records. He was a member of the Florida Razors with Tom Wilson and the Austin Music Band.

== Early life and career ==
Kessee was born in Oklahoma. He moved to Texas where he met Bill Hughes and Gary Dye and formed the band Lazarus. In the mid 1970’s, he moved to Canada where he performed as a bassist with Canadian artists including David Bradstreet and Jane Siberry, among the others.
