= David Bradstreet =

Canadian-based musician

David Bradstreet (born London, England) is a Canadian-based musician. He spent his childhood in Oakville, Ontario and began his music career in the late 1960s. He is best known for his song "Renaissance" ("Let’s Dance That Old Dance Once More") that was performed by Canadian country and folk musician Valdy. He won a Juno Award in 1978 for "most promising male vocalist" and was nominated three more times for best instrumental album.

== Awards and recognition ==
- 1978: winner, Juno Award, most promising male vocalist
- 1999: nominee, Juno Award, with Dan Gibson for best instrumental album, Whispering Woods
- 2000: nominee, Juno Award, with Dan Gibson for best instrumental album, Natural Sleep Inducement
- 2002: nominee, Juno Award, with Dan Gibson for best instrumental album, Angel's Embrace

== Partial discography ==
- 1976 David Bradstreet
- 1977 Dreaming in Colour
- 1980 Black & White"
- 1998 Renaissance
- 2006 Lifelines
- 2007 TheraSleep
- 2007 TheraCalm
- 2010 08.20.10 Bradstreet & Keesee
- 2020 Best Foot Forward
- 2023 Hindsight
- 2025 Bradstreet & Keesee LIVE in London
