= List of Metal Max video games =

Metal Max is a role-playing game series produced by Crea-Tech. Due to copyright problems, the series was split into two sub-series, "Metal Max" and "Metal Saga", with Metal Max being generally the main one. Metal Max was initially published by Data East, and later the "Metal Max" trademark was acquired by Enterbrain and the game was published by Kadokawa Games; Now Production and Enterbrain then published the portable versions of the games. Instead "Metal Saga" is a Success Company's trademark.

The first release of the series is Metal Max; it was released in NES in 1991, and was one of the first open-ended and non-linear role-playing video games.

== Metal Max series ==
Game	Details
Metal Max Original release dates: JP: May 24, 1991	Release years by system: 1991 – Nintendo Entertainment System; 1995 – Super Nintendo Entertainment System; 2010 – Wii Virtual Console (NES version); 2011 – Wii Virtual Console (SNES version); 2013 – Nintendo 3DS Virtual Console (NES version)
Metal Max Original release dates: JP: May 24, 1991	Notes: The original was published by Data East.; SNES remake named Metal Max Returns was developed by Kuusoukagaku.; All Virtual Console games were published by Enterbrain.
Metal Max Returns Original release dates: JP: 1995	Release years by system: 1995 – Super Nintendo Entertainment System
Metal Max Returns Original release dates: JP: 1995	Notes: SNES remake
Metal Max 2 Original release dates: JP: March 5, 1993	Release years by system: 1993 – Super Nintendo Entertainment System; 2003 – Game Boy Advance; 2010 – Wii Virtual Console; 2011 – Nintendo DS
Metal Max 2 Original release dates: JP: March 5, 1993	Notes: Game Boy Advance version is named Metal Max 2 Kai, which was remade and published by Now Production.; Wii Virtual Console version was published by Enterbrain.; Official name of the Nintendo DS remake is Metal Max 2: Reloaded, developed by Cattle Call and published by Kadokawa Games.
Metal Max 3 Original release dates: JP: July 29, 2010	Release years by system: 2010 – Nintendo DS
Metal Max 3 Original release dates: JP: July 29, 2010	Notes: The trademark belongs to Enterbrain, and the game published is by Kadokawa Games.
Metal Max 2 Reloaded Original release dates: JP: 2011	Release years by system: 2011 – Nintendo DS
Metal Max 2 Reloaded Original release dates: JP: 2011	Notes: DS remake
Metal Max 4: Gekkō no Diva Original release dates: JP: November 7, 2013	Release years by system: 2013 – Nintendo 3DS
Metal Max 4: Gekkō no Diva Original release dates: JP: November 7, 2013	Notes: Metaru Makkusu Fō Gekkō no Dīva (メタルマックス4 月光のディーヴァ; lit. Metal Max 4: Moonlight Diva)
Metal Max Xeno Original release dates: JP: April 19, 2018; NA: September 25, 2018; EU: September 28, 2018	Release years by system: 2018 – PS Vita, PS4
Matal Max Xeno: Reborn Original release date(s): JP: September 12, 2020; WW: June 10, 2022	Release years by system: 2020 - Nintendo Switch, PS4; 2022 - Microsoft Windows
Metal Dogs Original release date(s): WW: August 24, 2021; JP: April 8, 2022	Release years by system: 2021 - Microsoft Windows; 2022 - Nintendo Switch, PS4

== Metal Saga series ==
Game	Details
Metal Saga Original release dates: JP: June 9, 2005; NA: April 4, 2006	Release years by system: 2005 – PlayStation 2; 2006 – PlayStation 2 ("Best" version)
Metal Saga Original release dates: JP: June 9, 2005; NA: April 4, 2006	Notes: The game is known as Metal Saga: Sajin no Kusari (メタルサーガ ～砂塵の鎖～, lit. Metal Saga: Chain of Sandstorm) in Japan.; This spin-off used new trademark "Metal Saga" and was published by Success.; This is the first time the game was released in North America.; In March 2006, the "Best" version was published in Japan, being cheaper than the original version.; The first game of series, which used 3D graphics.
Metal Saga: Season of Steel Original release dates: JP: June 15, 2006	Release years by system: 2006 – Nintendo DS
Metal Saga: Season of Steel Original release dates: JP: June 15, 2006	Notes: Title lit. Metal Saga: Hagane no Kisetsu.
Metal Saga Mobile Original release dates: JP: 2007	Release years by system: 2007 – DoCoMo
Metal Saga Mobile Original release dates: JP: 2007	Notes: Only for Japan NTT DoCoMo mobile phones.; Also named Metal Saga: Senritsu no Rensa (メタルサーガ ～旋律の連鎖～; lit. Metal Saga: the Melody of Linkage).
Metal Saga New Frontier Original release dates: JP: March 18, 2010; CHN: 2011	Release years by system: 2010 – Web
Metal Saga New Frontier Original release dates: JP: March 18, 2010; CHN: 2011	Notes: Game is a component for the social networking site Mixi. It entered beta on January 14, 2010 and in formal operation on March 18.

== Cancelled ==
Game	Details
Metal Max Wild Eyes Cancellation date: 2001	Proposed system release: 2001 – Dreamcast
Metal Max Wild Eyes Cancellation date: 2001	Notes: Publisher is ASCII Entertainment; The game was tentatively named Metal Max Overdrive.
Metal Max Returns Kai Cancellation date: 2003	Proposed system release: 2003 – Game Boy Advance
Metal Max Returns Kai Cancellation date: 2003	Notes: This game is a portable version of Metal Max Returns and was remade and published by Now Production.
Metal Max: Wild West Cancellation date: 2022	Proposed system release: 2022 – PlayStation 4, Nintendo Switch
Metal Max: Wild West Cancellation date: 2022	Notes: The game was tentatively named Metal Max Xeno: Reborn 2.
