= List of cancelled Dreamcast games =

Cancelled games for video game console

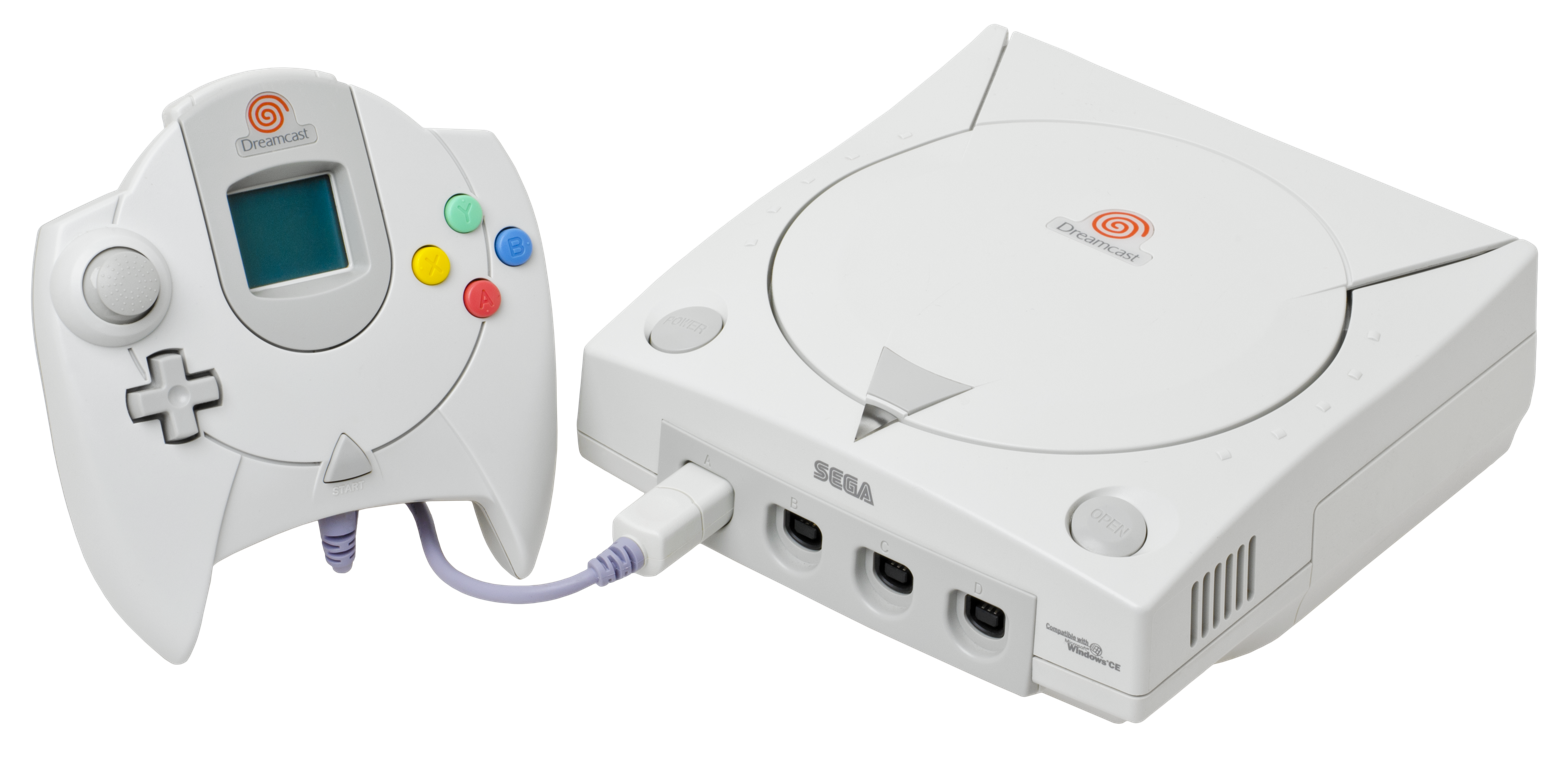
A Dreamcast with a controller

The Dreamcast is a video game console by Sega. While Sega found success in its Sega Genesis in the early 1990s, they experienced a series of commercial failures with their subsequent releases of Sega CD, 32X, and Sega Saturn, and hoped to reverse their fortunes with their release of the Dreamcast. However, the Dreamcast too featured a relatively short lifespan, launching across 1998 and 1999 in different regions, and being discontinued worldwide in March 2001. While the console had a moderately successful launch and opening year, momentum was slowed in the latter half of 2000, around the time of competitor Sony's launch of the PlayStation 2.

The platform specifically featured a large number of game cancellations when Sony's competing PlayStation 2 console launched in 2000, and then again in March 2001 upon the Dreamcast's discontinuation. This list documents games that were confirmed for the Dreamcast at some point, but did not end up being released for it.

== Games ==
There are currently 138 games on this list. (Note: This number is always up to date by this script.)

List of cancelled Dreamcast games
Title(s)	Notes/Reasons	Developer	Publisher
10Six	A MMORPG developed by SegaSoft, a short-lived Sega development team focused on creating PC games. While a PC version of the game was released in 2000 and active into 2002, a Dreamcast version was announced but never released.	SegaSoft	Sega
Actua Soccer	An iteration of Gremlin Interactive's Actua Soccer series was included in Hyper magazine's list of "Confirmed Dreamcast Titles in Development" in 1999, though no such title ever released.	Gremlin Interactive	VR Sports
The Adventures of Batman & Robin	A series of video game adaptions of The Adventures of Batman & Robin television show were released for the Genesis, Sega CD, Game Gear, and Super NES in the mid-1990s, and Hyper magazine listed Ubisoft as publishing a new iteration for the Dreamcast in 1999 that never materialized.	Ubisoft	Ubisoft
Agartha	Announced as a horror survival game for the Dreamcast, it had a lengthy development period, being scheduled for release in late 2001, well after the March 2001 discontinue date of the Dreamcast itself. It never released in any capacity.	No Cliché	Sega
Age of Empires II	A version for Dreamcast was announced and scheduled for release across 2000, but never materialized.	Ensemble Studios	Konami
Air Nights	A sequel to Nights into Dreams (1996) based around motion-control. Entered development for both Sega Saturn and later Dreamcast before being cancelled entirely.	Sega	Sega
Akolyte	Listed as a game confirmed in development for Dreamcast by IGN in 1998, few details on the game arose, and the game never released.	Ionos	Revenant
Alex: Virus Composer	A real-time strategy game listed as forthcoming in official Sega pamphlet, that did not materialise in any form.		Media Factory
Alien Breed: Conflict	A planned sequel to Alien Breed 3D II: The Killing Grounds for Dreamcast and PC, the game never ended up releasing in any capacity.	Team17	Team17
Alien: Resurrection	Announced in 1997 for the Sega Saturn, its lengthy and difficult 3 year development cycle expanded beyond the Saturn's lifecycle. It was planned for the Dreamcast for a period, but ultimately only saw release on PlayStation and Windows in 2000.	Argonaut Games	Fox Interactive
Aliens Versus Predator	In 1995, a video game adaptation of the Alien vs. Predator crossover franchise was announced for release in 1997 for the original PlayStation, Sega Saturn, and Microsoft Windows. The console version were in development into 1997, with the PlayStation version being present at E3 1997, but after delays, only the Windows version ever materialized when the game released in 1999. A Dreamcast version was later reported on by magazines, though it never materialized either.	Rebellion Developments	Fox Interactive
All-Star Baseball 2001	An entry in Iguana/Acclaim's yearly All-Star Baseball series was announced, but never materialized.	Iguana Entertainment	Acclaim Entertainment
Arcatera: The Dark Brotherhood	Announced for Dreamcast, but only ended up releasing on Microsoft Windows in 2000.	Westka Entertainment	Ubisoft
Arena Football	Scheduled for a release on Dreamcast in 2000, the game never materialized, though the same developers did release Kurt Warner's Arena Football Unleashed for the PlayStation in that same year instead.	Midway Games	Midway Games
Armada 2: Exodus	A proposed sequel to the original Armada, the game was announced for Dreamcast, but cancelled after the system itself was discontinued. Development continued on Xbox and PlayStation 2, but was eventually cancelled there as well.	Metro3D	Metro3D
Austin Powers: Mojo Rally	Announced in early 2000 as a kart racing game themed around the Austin Powers franchise, the game was cancelled just prior to its October 2000 release date, citing that the market was already saturated with licensed kart racing games.	Climax Studios	Take-Two Interactive
Baldur's Gate	A port of the 1998 PC release was announced for the Dreamcast, but was cancelled in late 2000.	BioWare	Sega
Black & White	Announced for the Dreamcast and PC platforms, the Dreamcast version never released. The PC version was released the same month the Dreamcast was discontinued.	Lionhead Studios	Sega
Braveknight	Originally announced for the Dreamcast, the game only ended up releasing for the original Xbox in 2002.	Panther Software	Panther Software
Buffy the Vampire Slayer	Originally in development for the PlayStation, Dreamcast and PC, publisher Fox Interactive announced that they would likely cancel their remaining Dreamcast titles in development on 20 March 2001 which was officially confirmed the following month when the publisher announced that the title would become an Xbox exclusive.	The Collective	Fox Interactive
Castlevania Resurrection	Was roughly 25% complete, and was present in playable form in E3 1999. Konami cancelled it, and every Dreamcast game in production, in March 2000, the day the PlayStation 2 was officially announced and revealed.The playable E3 build leaked onto the internet over 20 years later in 2021.	Konami	Konami
Chakan: The Forever Man 2	A sequel to the Sega Genesis game Chakan: The Forever Man was announced for the Dreamcast, but was cancelled.	Sega	Sega
Colin McRae Rally 2.0	A Dreamcast version was announced, but only the PlayStation and Windows versions ever released.	Codemasters	Codemasters
Commandos 2: Men of Courage	Eidos Interactive cancelled the Dreamcast version of the game mid-2001, citing the Dreamcast's discontinuation as the reason. The game still released across 2001 and 2002 on Windows, PlayStation 2, and the original Xbox.	Pyro Studios	Eidos Interactive
Croc 2	Originally planned for the Sega Saturn, its early demise shifted development to the Dreamcast, though that was cancelled in mid-2000 due to the poor sales of their prior Dreamcast release Red Dog: Superior Firepower, and the company's subsequent shift to PlayStation 2 development. Croc 2 still released on PlayStation 1 and Windows.	Argonaut Software	Fox Interactive
D-Jump!	The game was in development across many platforms, including the Dreamcast, in the late 1990s as a platformer with a time travel storyline, though it never released in any capacity.	Ubi Soft Paris	Ubisoft
Dark Angel: Vampire Apocalypse	Originally announced for the Dreamcast in 1999, only a PlayStation 2 version ever materialized.	Metro3D	Metro3D
Daytona USA 2	The arcade game was scheduled for release on Dreamcast, but Sega opted to release Daytona USA 2001, an upgraded version of the original Daytona USA, instead.	Sega	Sega
Dee Dee Planet	A follow-up to ChuChu Rocket was in development and scheduled for release on the Dreamcast in 2001. The game similarly focused on online multiplayer with gameplay similar to the Worms series of video games. It was reportedly cancelled due to the bugs and issues with its network play. In 2021, a near-complete beta copy of the game was obtained and leaked onto the internet. Fans eventually fixed the bugs, making it completely playable online the following year.	Sega	Sega
Deer Avenger 3D	The third entry of the Deer Avenger series was announced for Dreamcast, but never materialized.	Hypnotix	Simon & Schuster Interactive
Desert Island / No Man's Island / Super Real Island	Super Real Island was intended to be a hybrid RPG/simulation game for 64DD, with players cultivating an island to grow food and stay alive while contending with dangerous wildlife that emerge as a result. After being cancelled, the project later restarted development under the name Desert Island, with Imagineer considering releasing it for N64 cartridge or Dreamcast; however, the game was ultimately not released for any system.	Imagineer	Imagineer
Diablo II	A Dreamcast version of the PC game was listed in Hyper magazine's list of "Confirmed Dreamcast Titles in Development" in 1999, but never materialized.	Blizzard Entertainment	Blizzard Entertainment
Dogs of War	A Dreamcast version of the PC game was announced for sometime in 2000, but never materialized.	Silicon Dreams	Take-Two Interactive
Dragon's Crown	An early version of Dragon's Crown started development on the Dreamcast. This version would have featured 3D graphics rather than developer Vanillaware's trademark 2D style, fearing this was the only thing publisher's would accept at the time. Eventually, it was cancelled, years later being restarted and released in a very different form on PlayStation Vita and PlayStation 3 in 2013.	Vanillaware	Atlus
Dynamite Robo	Listed in an official January 1999 'Dream Information' pamphlet as a Winter 1999 release and in Hyper magazine's list of "Confirmed Dreamcast Titles in Development" in 1999, but never materialized	Warashi	Warashi
Ecco II: Sentinels of the Universe	A sequel to Ecco the Dolphin: Defender of the Future was in development for the Dreamcast, and unlike many late Dreamcast games, was never ported to other platforms after the Dreamcast's demise. A playable, early-in-development version of the game leaked onto the internet in 2016.	Sega	Sega
Entertainment Golf	Listed in Hyper magazine's list of "Confirmed Dreamcast Titles in Development" in 1999, but never materialized.	Bottom Up	Bottom Up
Ephemeral Fantasia	Originally announced for the Dreamcast, that version was cancelled, and development moved to PlayStation 2. Konami reportedly cancelled all upcoming Dreamcast games upon the reveal of the PS2 in March 2000.	Konami	Konami
ESPN Baseball Tonight	Konami had obtained the license to release another game in the series had previously appeared on the Sega Genesis, Sega CD, SNES, and Windows and announced plans to release a new game under the title for the Dreamcast, though the title was eventually delayed and finally cancelled. Dreamcast, but never released.	Konami	Konami
ESPN Links Golf	Another ESPN branded sports title Konami had gained the rights to, and announced plans for on Dreamcast, but never released in any capacity.	Konami	Konami
Fable	Development began in 2000 as a Dreamcast game, but was cancelled and transitioned to the Xbox as its four-year development period extended well beyond the Dreamcast's lifespan, releasing for Xbox in 2004.	Lionhead Studios	Feral Interactive
The Flintstones in Viva Rock Vegas	A racing game based on the film The Flintstones in Viva Rock Vegas was in development for Dreamcast and PlayStation 2, scheduled for release in March 2001. However, only the PS2 version saw release.		Virgin Interactive
Fortris	Originally announced as Fortris by developer Promethean Designs for the Dreamcast and PlayStation 1, Majesco obtained to the rights for the game, moved development to the Game Boy Advance under their own internal development team, and released it only for the Game Boy Advance in 2001.	Promethean Designs	Majesco
Galleon	Originally announced in 1999 for release on Dreamcast and PC, the game's lengthy seven year development period expanded well beyond the Dreamcast's lifespan. Development was moved to GameCube, cancelled there as well, and finally released on the Xbox in 2004.	Confounding Factor	SCi Games/Atlus
Geist Force	Debuted at E3 1998 and intended as a launch title for the Dreamcast, after delays, internal disagreements, and Sega's lack of confidence in the title, the title was cancelled. In a 2021 retrospective, Sega of America producer Mark Subotnick blamed negative interactions with Yuji Naka for hurting morale, turnover, and progress on the game as well.	Sega of America, Netter Digital	Sega
Glover 2	A sequel to the game Glover was announced for Dreamcast, Nintendo 64, and the PlayStation, but was cancelled for all platforms due to financial problems at Hasbro Interactive. An unfinished build leaked to the internet in 2011.	Blitz Games	Hasbro Interactive
Gold and Glory: The Road to El Dorado	Dreamcast, GameCube and PlayStation 2 versions of the PlayStation and Windows versions of the game were announced, but never materialized.	Revolution Software	Ubisoft
Gorkamorka	A video game adaption of the tabletop game of the same name was announced for Dreamcast and Windows, but never materialized.	Realtime Associates	Ripcord Games
Grand Theft Auto III	Many early development tests in the brainstorming process for creating the game were first performed on Dreamcast hardware, including small sections of cities that a character could explore, with people and cars driving around in it. Approximately four months of development time for a Dreamcast version happened, until it was cancelled and development switched to the PlayStation 2, where it released in 2001. Members say that it was strictly a financial decision - due to the commercial failure of the Dreamcast - and they felt they could have technically gotten the game running on the Dreamcast's hardware.	DMA Design	Rockstar Games
Gunvalkyrie	Originally announced as a title in development for the Dreamcast, development was shifted to the Xbox upon the Dreamcast's discontinuation, where it released in 2002.	Smilebit	Sega
Half-Life/Half-Life: Blue Shift	A Dreamcast version was in development across 2000 and 2001 until being cancelled in July 2001, citing "changing market conditions", 3 months after the discontinuation of the Dreamcast itself. Both still released on PC platforms.	Gearbox Software, Valve Corporation	Sierra On-Line
Heavy Metal: F.A.K.K. 2	A Dreamcast version was scheduled, but the game only ended up releasing on PC platforms.	Ritual Entertainment	
Hello Kitty's Cube Frenzy	A Dreamcast version was announced, but only PlayStation and Game Boy Color versions ever materialized.	Culture Publishers	NewKidCo
Heroes of Might and Magic III	A port of the 1999 PC versions of the game was announced for Dreamcast, and planned for release into 2001, but never materialized.	3DO	Ubisoft
Hostile Waters	Originally announced for a late 2000 release on Dreamcast, the release never happened, though it later released on PC platforms in 2001 under the new title Hostile Waters: Antaeus Rising.	Rage Software	Interplay
Hype: The Time Quest	Released on Windows in 1999, console versions were scheduled for release across 2000 and 2001 for Nintendo 64, Dreamcast, and PlayStation 2, though only the PlayStation 2 port ever materialized.	Ubisoft	Ubisoft
IHRA Drag Racing	Was cancelled in April 2001 due to the discontinuation of the Dreamcast hardware the month prior, though the game still released on the PlayStation and Windows.	Digital Dialect	Bethesda Softworks
Independence War 2: Edge of Chaos	Announced for the Dreamcast and Windows PC in 2000, the Dreamcast version was cancelled in October 2000 when publisher Infogrames was re-evaluating its Dreamcast software support. The PC version still released after the Dreamcast's discontinuation in 2001.	Particle Systems	Infogrames
Indiana Jones and the Infernal Machine	Confirmed for a fall 2000 release on Dreamcast release at E3 2000 but this never materialized.	LucasArts	LucasArts
Innocent Tears	Originally announced for the Dreamcast, the game only ended up releasing for the original Xbox in 2002.	Global A Entertainment	Kobi
International Superstar Soccer 2000	An iteration of Konami's International Superstar Soccer series was included in Hyper magazine's list of "Confirmed Dreamcast Titles in Development" in 1999, though no such title ever released.	Konami Computer Entertainment Osaka	Konami
Internet Game Pack	Designed as a collection of minigames to demonstrate the Dreamcast's abilities to play games over an internet connection, similar to Wii Sports demonstrating the motion controls of the Wii, the game never released due to the discontinuation of the Dreamcast in 2001.	Visual Concepts	Sega
Iri-san	A tech demo created and shown by Sega and Sonic Team employees upon the Dreamcast reveal, created to its graphical abilities. Consisting of a recreation of then-Sega president Shoichiro Irimajiri's head where the player could manipulate and add effects to it, similar to the opening of Super Mario 64, despite popularity leading up to the Dreamcast's release, it never materialized into a game release.	Sonic Team	Sega
Jet Set Radio Future	Originally scheduled to release on Dreamcast but was instead later released as an Xbox exclusive.	Smilebit	Sega
Jump Runner	Announced as a genre-bending action space opera game for Dreamcast where the player controls the villain, the game never materialized in any capacity.	Glass Ghost	Sega
Legacy of Kain: Soul Reaver 2	The project was initially started as a project on Dreamcast and the PlayStation, but in May 2000, after putting together a mock-up of what could be accomplished on PlayStation 2 for an E3 2000 presentation, Eidos Interactive decided to cancel the prior version and shift to a PS2 and Windows release, which occurred in late 2001.	Crystal Dynamics	Eidos Interactive
Legend of the Blade Masters	Announced and advertised as a role-playing video game for the Dreamcast throughout 2000 and 2001, the game never materialized.	Ronin Entertainment	Ripcord Games
Max Payne	The game was originally in development for the Dreamcast and Windows, but development was delayed out of the Dreamcast's lifespan, with development staying with Windows and shifting to PlayStation 2 and the original Xbox.	Remedy Entertainment, 3D Realms	Take-Two Interactive
Messiah	Originally announced for Dreamcast, PlayStation, and Windows, only the Windows version ever released. The Dreamcast version was delayed and eventually cancelled due to the slow hardware sales of the Dreamcast.	Shiny Entertainment	Interplay Entertainment
Metal Max: Wild Eyes	Announced for Dreamcast, the game was cancelled and never released in any capacity, although elements from the game was later cited as an influences in developing a future entry in the Metal Max series, Metal Max Xeno (2018), for the PlayStation 4 and PlayStation Vita.	Crea-Tech	ASCII
Michelin Rally Masters: Race of Champions / Test Drive Rally / Rally Masters	Originally announced as Rally Masters in 1999, the game saw a name change when original publisher Gremlin Interactive was bought out by Infogrames, to Test Drive Rally, and then again to its final name. Originally scheduled to release on Nintendo 64, Dreamcast, the original PlayStation, and PC platforms, both the Nintendo 64 and Dreamcast version were cancelled prior to the other versions release, with Infogrames stating that those version were not meeting their internal standards, despite IGN previously previewing a playable build of the game and giving generally positive remarks.	Digital Illusions CE	Infogrames
Microsoft Combat Flight Simulator	An entry from the Microsoft Combat Flight Simulator series was scheduled to release on Dreamcast, but it was never identified which of the three Windows releases were to be released, and none ever materialized.	Microsoft	Konami
Midnight GT	The game was announced for the Dreamcast in 1999, and deemed about 65% complete in early 2000, but never released, though a Windows PC version released in 2002.	Rage Games	Rage Games
Monster Breed	Announced as a monster-raising simulation by Japanese developer NEC Interchannel for the Dreamcast, and later confirmed for English localization by UFO Interactive Games, the game never ended up releasing in any capacity.	NEC Interchannel	UFO Interactive Games
Monster Breeder	A separate monster-raising game announced for the Dreamcast unrelated to Monster Breed, by American developer Tommo. The game similarly never released in any capacity.	Tommo	Tommo
Mortal Kombat: Special Forces	The Mortal Kombat spinoff Special Forces was initially announced for release on the Nintendo 64, PlayStation, and Dreamcast. However, following several departures from the game's development team, including Mortal Kombat co-creator John Tobias, the Nintendo 64 and Dreamcast versions were cancelled and the PlayStation version underwent a rushed development cycle, releasing in 2000 to significantly negative reception.	Midway Games	Midway Games
The Mummy	A Dreamcast version was announced alongside PlayStation and Windows PC versions, but the Dreamcast version did not launch alongside the others, and Konami instead focused on making further game's based on the movie's sequels instead.	Rebellion Developments	Konami
Ninja Gaiden	Development of Ninja Gaiden (2004) initially began on the Dreamcast, but was cancelled due to the system's failure. It later shifted development to PlayStation 2 before eventually releasing only on Xbox	Team Ninja	Tecmo
Outcast	A Dreamcast port of the Windows PC game was announced, but never materialized due to the poor sales of the PC version.	Appeal Software	Infogrames
PBA Tour Bowling 2	A Dreamcast version of the PC game was listed in NextGen magazine's upcoming Dreamcast releases for April 2001, but never materialized.	Bethesda Softworks	Bethesda Softworks
Pilot Kids	A Dreamcast version of the arcade game was listed in Hyper magazine's list of "Confirmed Dreamcast Titles in Development" in 1999, but never materialized.	Psikyo	Psikyo
Planet of the Apes	A Planet of the Apes game was listed as a game in development as early as 1997. However, no Planet of the Apes game was released until 2001, well after the Saturn's lifespan. A version was announced for the Saturn's successor, the Dreamcast, was also announced, but never released, as the game only released on PlayStation and Windows.	Visiware Studios	Fox Interactive
Polaris SnoCross	A Dreamcast version was scheduled for release up until early 2001, but only ended up releasing for Nintendo 64, PlayStation, and Windows.	Vicarious Visions	Vatical Entertainment
Project Eden	Originally announced for Dreamcast and Windows PC for a Q3 2000 release, its release was later delayed, and eventually shifted to PlayStation 2 and PC, where it released in late 2001. When asked for the reason for the platform change, programmer Gavin Rummery stated that the team was unable to achieve optimal performance on the Dreamcast hardware.	Core Design	Eidos Interactive
Propeller Arena	A Sega developed game for the Dreamcast, it was completed and scheduled to release in September 2001, but delayed and eventually cancelled due to the September 11 attacks that occurred days before its release, and the fact that it contained gameplay where the player could fly planes in the vicinity of tall buildings in a city. While it never officially released in any capacity, the game later leaked onto the internet over a decade later.	Sega AM2	Sega
Rampage World Tour	An port of the 1997 arcade game was developed for most platforms at the time, and a Dreamcast version was listed on Hyper magazine's list of "Confirmed Dreamcast Titles in Development" in 1999, though a Dreamcast version released.	Midway Games	Midway Games
Real Life Career Collection	UK Official Dreamcast Magazine reported in November 2000 that three arcade titles (Emergency Call Ambulance, Jambo! Safari and Brave Firefighters) were to be released in a compilation entitled Real Life Career Collection in the UK in "early summer 2001", but this never materialised. IGN contradicted the story, reporting that "Sources close to Sega confirmed that a project was in the works but never got past the initial planning stages or was kept very, very quiet".	Sega	Sega
Red Fury	Listed on Hyper magazine's list of "Confirmed Dreamcast Titles in Development" in 1999, but never materialized.		iMagicGames
Renegade Racers	The racing game Wild Water World Championships was first revealed for Nintendo 64 in 1999. Shortly thereafter, this version was cancelled, alongside a prospective Dreamcast port, with the game eventually releasing on PlayStation and Windows as Renegade Racers (1999).	Promethean Designs	Interplay Entertainment
Roswell Conspiracies: Aliens, Myths and Legends	A video game adaption for the Roswell Conspiracies: Aliens, Myths and Legends television show was announced for Dreamcast, Nintendo 64, PlayStation, and Game Boy Color, though only the PlayStation and Game Boy Color versions were released.	Climax Studios	Red Storm Entertainment
Rune	A Dreamcast port of the PC game was rumored after its PC release, but only a PlayStation 2 version ever materialized.	Human Head Studios	
Sanity: Aiken's Artifact	Originally announced for Dreamcast and Windows PC, the Dreamcast version was cancelled shortly after its appearance at E3 2000 in September, without reason.	Monolith Productions	Fox Interactive
Scud Race	Released as an arcade game in 1996, a Sega Saturn version was announced, but cancelled in favor of a Dreamcast version. While demos of the game running on Dreamcast were reportedly shown in private presentations, a game release never materialized on Dreamcast either.	Sega	Sega
Sea-Doo Hydrocross	Originally announced for the Dreamcast, Nintendo 64, and PlayStation, only the PS1 version ever released.	Vicarious Visions	Vatical Entertainment
Shienryu 2	A proposed sequel to Shienryu, it never released in any capacity.	Warashi	Warashi
Shinobi	The game was originally planned to be released on the Dreamcast, but its discontinuation in 2001 lead the development team to develop it for the PlayStation 2 instead, where it released in 2002.	Overworks	Sega
Shogo: Mobile Armor Division	Listed in Hyper magazine's list of "Confirmed Dreamcast Titles in Development" in 1999, but only ever released on PC platforms.	Monolith Productions	Monolith Productions
Shrapnel: Urban Warfare 2025	Originally announced as a part of their Spec Ops series, it setting taking place in the future unlike other entries lead it to become its own thing separate from the series. It was a first person shooter announced for the Dreamcast and PC, with local and online multiplayer. In October 2000, GamePro announced it was far enough along to be released the following month, though it was delayed into 2001, and then again indefinitely after the discontinuation of the Dreamcast in March 2001, and was never released on any platform.	Zombie Studios	Ripcord Games
The Simpsons: Bug Squad!	Game was never announced, but found on an old Dreamcast development kit in 2020. Content found seemed to suggest the game involved exploring the world of The Simpsons through perspective of a small flying insect.	Red Lemon Studios	Fox Interactive
SSX	Early work on the game started on the Dreamcast. After the reveal of the PlayStation 2, and Electronic Arts subsequent decision to not develop games for the Dreamcast due to their reservations on the Dreamcast's power and development details, development was shifted to the PS2, where it released in 2000.	Electronic Arts	Electronic Arts
Star Trek: New Worlds	A Dreamcast version was announced, but only a PC version ever released.	Runecraft	Virgin Interactive
Star Wars: Super Bombad Racing	The PlayStation 2 release was prioritized, and fare poorly critically and commercially, leading to the cancellation of the announced Dreamcast and Windows PC versions.	Lucas Learning	Lucas Learning
Streets of Rage 4	A fourth entry in the Streets of Rage series was worked on for the Dreamcast, but cancelled early in production. A fourth Streets of Rage title would not be released until the multiplatform Streets of Rage 4 (2020).	Sega	Sega
Strider 2	Listed in Hyper magazine's list of "Confirmed Dreamcast Titles in Development" in 1999, but never materialized.	Capcom	Capcom
Stunt Car Racing	Listed in Hyper magazine's list of "Confirmed Dreamcast Titles in Development" in 1999, but never materialized.	Interplay Entertainment	Hasbro Interactive
Super Monkey Ball	A Dreamcast version of the arcade game was originally planned, but was canceled and development was shifted to the GameCube after the Dreamcast was discontinued.	Amusement Vision	Sega
Supreme Snowboarding (Boarder Zone in the US)	One of a number of PC ports announced by Infogrames, but canceled in October 2000 when the publisher was re-evaluating (but not cancelling all) their Dreamcast software support.	Housemarque	Infogrames
Supreme Snowboarding 2	A sequel to Supreme Snowboarding was originally in development for the Dreamcast, but development soon transitioned to the Xbox following the discontinuation of the system, and was renamed Transworld Snowboarding upon its announcement at E3 2001 following Infogrames securing a licensing deal with Transworld Media to release three titles.	Housemarque	Infogrames
SWAT 3: Close Quarters Battle	A Dreamcast port of the 1999 PC game release was announced, but never released.	Sierra Northwest	Sierra On-Line
Symphony of the Light	Initially beginning development for Dreamcast, the target platform changed to PlayStation 2 in April 2000 before Microsoft made an offer the following September to publish the game as a console exclusive for Xbox, for which it eventually released as Sudeki (2004).	Climax Studios	
System Shock 2	A Dreamcast port of the 1999 PC game release was announced, but never released. An unfinished prototype was discovered on a Dreamcast development kit in 2010.	Irrational Games, Looking Glass Studios, Marina Games	Vatical Entertainment
Take the Bullet	A first person shooter in development for the Dreamcast, the game never officially released in any capacity, though a playable prototype leaked onto the internet in 2020.	Red Lemon Studios	Red Storm Entertainment
Test Drive Cycles	A proposed spinoff of the Test Drive series of video games that would have featured motorbike racing, all versions (Dreamcast, PlayStation, Windows) were cancelled outside of a vastly different Game Boy Color version.	Infogrames North America	Infogrames North America
Test Drive: Off-Road 3	A port of the PlayStation version of the game was announced, but ultimately cancelled due to the development time it would take to improve the game up to Dreamcast's graphical abilities, and the large number of racing game (including other Test Drive games) already available for the platform.	Infogrames North America	Infogrames North America
Thunder Force VI	Originally starting its development as a Dreamcast game, it was later cancelled after Thunder Force series developer Technosoft was bought out. Sega later bought the rights to the game, developing and finishing the game for PlayStation 2.	Tecno Soft	Sega
Time Crisis II	A port of the arcade game was announced for Dreamcast, but only ever ended up releasing on PlayStation 2 in late 2001.	Namco	Namco
Title Defense	Listed in Hyper magazine's list of "Confirmed Dreamcast Titles in Development" in 1999, but never materialized.	Climax Studios	
ToeJam & Earl III: Mission to Earth	The game was in development for the Dreamcast and was shown at E3 2001, but was cancelled after the discontinuation of the Dreamcast in 2002. Development was moved to the Xbox, finished, and released across late 2002 and 2003.	Visual Concepts	Sega
Toy Fighter	A Dreamcast port of Sega's arcade fighting game Toy Fighter (1999) was reported to be in development but never materialized.	Anchor	Sega
Tropico	Originally announced for Dreamcast and PC platforms, the Dreamcast version was cancelled shortly after the discontinuation of the platform, while developers focuses on releasing the PC version later in the year.	PopTop Software	Gathering of Developers
Turrican 3D	A modernized 3D sequel to the 2D Turrican series of games was announced for Windows PC and heavily reported to be in development for the Dreamcast, but never released in any capacity. While no official reason was ever given, development team members reported there being creative differences in transitioning the game into 3D space.	Factor 5	THQ
Turok 2: Seeds of Evil	Announced in 1998 as Acclaim Entertainment's first game for the Dreamcast, the Dreamcast port of the Nintendo 64 game never materialized.	Iguana Entertainment	Acclaim Entertainment
UEFA 2001	A proposed sequel to UEFA Striker, it was one of a number of games announced by Infogrames, but canceled in October 2000 when the publisher was re-evaluating (but not cancelling all) their Dreamcast software support.	Rage Games	Infogrames
UFC: Tapout	Originally announced as a Dreamcast title, its development was put on hold to focus on a release on the Xbox, which was the only platform the game ended up releasing on.	DreamFactory	Crave Entertainment
Unreal	A port of the 1998 Windows PC game was announced as a Dreamcast launch title, but never released, at launch or otherwise.	Epic Games	Epic Games
V.I.P.	A licensed video game adaption of the television series of the same name released for PlayStation, PlayStation 2, and Windows PCs, the Dreamcast version never materialized.	Kalisto Entertainment	Ubisoft
Varuna's Forces	The game was in a lengthy development period for a number of platforms that had shorter lifespans - Sega Saturn, Dreamcast, 3DO, Atari Jaguar, but development generally ran after their respective platform's lifespans, and was eventually cancelled even from its PC release.	Accent Media	JVCKenwood Victor Entertainment
Virtua Golf	Released as an arcade game, a Dreamcast version was announced by Sega, but was pulled from Sega's first party game release schedule in 2001, and was never released for the Dreamcast or ported to any other platforms once Sega started publishing games as a third party publisher.	Wow Entertainment	Sega
Virtual Pool 3	Featured in the official Sega press kit for E3 2000 but did not materialise.	Celeris	Interplay Entertainment
Viva Soccer/Viva Football	Originally scheduled for release on Dreamcast, only PlayStation and Windows versions ever materialized.	Crimson Software	Virgin Interactive
VJ Monster	Listed in official Japanese promotional material as a late 1999 release but did not materialise.	Waka Manufacturing	
Wärrz	Originally announced as a Sega Saturn title at the 1997 Tokyo Game Show, the title was then announced as in development for the Dreamcast, but never materialised.	Shoeui System	
Warzone 2100	A Dreamcast version of the PC game was listed in Hyper magazine's list of "Confirmed Dreamcast Titles in Development" in 1999, but never materialized.	Pumpkin Studios	Eidos Interactive
Whiplash 2	Announced as a sequel to Fatal Racing (called Whiplash in North America) for the Dreamcast, the game never released in any capacity.		Interplay Entertainment
Woody Woodpecker Racing	A Dreamcast version was advertised alongside the PlayStation and Windows versions for a Christmas 2000 release, but never materialized.	Syrox Developments	Konami
World's Scariest Police Chases	The Dreamcast version of the game was cancelled in March 2001, though the PlayStation version still released in June 2001.	Unique Development Studios	Fox Interactive
Worms Pinball	A Dreamcast version was advertised alongside the PlayStation and Windows versions, but never materialized.	Team17	Infogrames
Www.Soccer	A soccer management simulation game announced in 1999, scheduled for release the following year. The game would have featured an online mode where players could compete as coaches in the same league. The game never materialized in any capacity.	Clean Flight	Clean Flight
