= Metal Max 3 =

2010 video game

- Developer: Cattle Call
- Publishers: Kadokawa Games; Enterbrain; Crea-Tech
- Director: Tomoki Tauchi
- Producer: Yoshihiro Yamamoto
- Designer: Hiroshi Miyaoka
- Programmer: Kazuki Takei
- Artists: Masaki Hirooka; Atsuji Yamamoto; Shun Kise
- Composer: Satoshi Kadokura
- Series: Metal Max
- Platform: Nintendo DS
- Release: JP: July 29, 2010
- Genre: Role-playing
- Mode: Single-player

Metal Max 3 (メタルマックス3, Metaru Makkusu Surī) is the seventh entry in the Metal Max series. It is a vehicle combat RPG produced by Cattle Call and co-published by Kadokawa Games, Enterbrain, and Crea-Tech for the Nintendo DS exclusively in Japan in 2010.

In 1993, Metal Max 2 was published by Data East, who retained the trademark rights to the series until its closure in 2003 and the liquidation of its intellectual properties in the following year. In April 2009, Enterbrain (Kadokawa's subsidiary) obtained the rights and published Metal Max 3 the next year. It is the first numbered entry in the series in 17 years. A remade version of Metal Max 2 for the Nintendo DS was published in 2011, and utilizes Metal Max 3's engine.

Similarly to its predecessors, the game is open-ended and non-linear.

== Gameplay ==
Much of the gameplay is similar to its predecessors, Metal Max and Metal Max 2. The game is open-ended and non-linear, with the player given the freedom to decide where to go and what missions to do in whichever order. The player can choose the character classes and subclasses, besides a mechanic, soldier, artist or other, for the player characters. The battles are turn-based, with the characters able to fight either on foot or using tanks. The tanks can be created and customized by the player, who can modify and enhance each part of a vehicle, though there is a weight limit to each tank which mostly depends on an engine. In certain areas where tanks cannot pass, the characters must engage the enemies on foot. The game also features gambling machines where minigames can be played, including third-person shooter and racing games.

== Synopsis ==
The protagonist was picked up and revived by mad scientist Dr. Minch, but he suffered from severe memory loss and cannot remember anything about himself. Therefore, the protagonist decided to travel around the world as a bounty hunter, in order to retrieve his memories and find out his true identity.

== Development ==
Since Metal Max 2 was released in 1993, original publisher Data East planned to release a new entry which underwent a troubled development cycle. During this time, a Dreamcast game named Metal Max: Wild Eyes was planned, and was set to be published by ASCII Entertainment, but the game was later cancelled, due to the publisher quitting video game business. There were also other companies interested in developing a sequel for the Game Boy, but they given up later on. In 2003, Data East went into bankruptcy, and the trademark for the game was acquired by other companies. The series was then published by Success under the name Metal Saga. In 2008, Enterbrain invited the producer of Metal Max 2 to make a new game in the series, and obtained the original trademark in 2009. The game was published in July 2010 by Enterbrain's subsidiary Kadokawa Games.

== Translation ==
In June 2020, an unofficial English fan translation was released by a translation group known as Metal Dreamers.

== Reception ==
While RPGamer scored Metal Max 3 4.5/5, Japanese gaming magazine Famitsu awarded the game 33/40. The game was praised for its vast degrees of freedom and its tank system, but reviews criticized high encounter rates and slow-paced gameplay.
