= Metal Max Xeno =

2018 video game

- Developers: Kadokawa Games; Cattle Call; 24Frame
- Publishers: JP: Kadokawa Games; NA: NIS America; EU: NIS America
- Director: Hiroshi Miyaoka
- Producer: Juntaro Kono
- Artists: Non Oda; Atsuji Yamamoto
- Composer: Satoshi Kadokura
- Series: Metal Max
- Platforms: PlayStation 4; PlayStation Vita; Reborn: Nintendo Switch; PlayStation 4; Microsoft Windows
- Release: PlayStation 4: JP: 19 April 2018; NA: 25 September 2018; EU: 28 September 2018; PlayStation Vita: JP: 19 April 2018; Reborn; Nintendo Switch, PlayStation 4: JP: 10 September 2020; WW: 10 June 2022; Microsoft Windows: WW: 10 June 2022
- Genre: Role-playing
- Mode: Single-player

Metal Max Xeno (Note: Japanese: メタルマックス ゼノ, Hepburn: Metaru Makkusu Zeno) is a role-playing video game developed by Kadokawa Games, Cattle Call and 24Frame, and was released in Japan for PlayStation 4 and PlayStation Vita in April 2018 by Kadokawa Games. The PlayStation 4 version was released in North America and Europe in September of the same year. It is the sixth title in the original Metal Max main series, and the second title for Sony's PlayStation console, the first being PlayStation 2's Metal Saga.

A remake, titled Metal Max Xeno: Reborn, was released in Japan for Nintendo Switch and PlayStation 4 in September 2020, and was released worldwide alongside a port for Microsoft Windows in June 2022.

== Plot ==
Metal Max Xeno takes place in the former location of Tokyo Bay, now a desert referred to as Distokio by its inhabitants, approximately a century after the "Great Annihilation" in which the supercomputer NOA attempted to destroy human civilization in order to prevent further ecological disasters. NOA is eventually defeated, but with its final moments it sends an order to its creations, colloquially known as "SoNs", to completely exterminate humanity, thus beginning a second genocidal campaign. The SoNs quickly began to overwhelm and destroy the remaining settlements in the Distokio area, leaving only a secret technologically advanced underground bunker called the "Iron Base" as the last surviving settlement. The Iron Base, which formerly served as the center of a post-apocalypse city known as Iron Town, is run by four survivors: D'Annunzio the base manager, Jingoro the head mechanic, Yokky, Jingoro's alcoholic protege, and Po-M, an android logistics officer.

Iron Base is visited by a young man with a metal arm (the player character, default name "Talis"), who announces his intentions to destroy the SoNs with his tank in revenge for their attack on his hometown and subsequent deaths of his mother and adopted father. The citizens of Iron Base agree to help him, in exchange for his assistance in seeking out survivors from the surrounding settlements. Talis finds no survivors in the ruined settlements, but, following an encounter with a large spider-like SoN, he rescues Toni, a former resident of Iron Town and the crush of Yokky, who had believed her to be dead.

Yokky joins Talis in searching for survivors and the two encounter Dylan, the former leader of a bandit gang that had harassed Iron Town in the past, and save him from a tank hacked by the SoNs. He is taken back to the Iron Base, where he is reluctantly allowed to stay and recover, and Toni joins Yokky and Talis as they travel north to locate new survivors. The three encounter Misaki, an academic who wanders the desert in a Flakpanzer Gepard searching for lost knowledge from before the apocalypse, and with their help he locates the entrance to a massive underground book repository guarded by Maria, the last surviving member of the repository's staff. After Talis assists Maria in destroying a group of SoNs besieging the repository, they, along with Misaki, move the books to Iron Base for safekeeping, and Maria and Misaki, along with a newly recovered Dylan, join the Iron Base as new residents.

Following the operation, the team gathers for a small celebration. Yokky, noticing Talis' absence, excuses himself to search for him, and finds him in the midst of a painful seizure. While trying to assist him, Yokky discovers Talis' body is almost completely cybernetic; Talis confides to him that it is the result of nanobots which allow him to use his metal arm as a weapon and heal damage to his body quickly, but at the price of him being turned into a machine by the nanobots, and that eventually he will no longer be "himself". Talis asks Yokky not to reveal his secret to anyone, but Toni overhears and becomes concerned for Talis, as she has begun to develop feelings for him. The next morning, Po-M reveals that data recovered from the library indicated the existence of "Cherbourg", a massive defense shield that could protect Iron Base from SoNs attacks. Cherbourg was being developed by an underground society called U-Tokio, but U-Tokio was destroyed following a failed operation to retake sectors of the surface from the SoNs, and Cherbourg was left uncompleted, its components scattered across the ruins of Distokio and U-Tokio. With Cherbourg, Iron Base would be able to adequately defend itself against attacks and rebuild Iron Town, so Po-M tasks Talis with recovering Cherbourg's components so that they may complete it.

As they begin the search, they encounter an enormous SoN that Talis recognizes as the one that killed his mother and destroyed his home town. In a blind fury, he attacks it, but is defeated by a massive blast from the SoN and is brought back to Iron Base. Po-M nicknames the SoN "Catastropus" and identifies it as the one responsible for the destruction of the other settlements in Distokio, but warns that it is too powerful for Talis to confront at his current strength. Talis, frustrated, asks if there is anything to help him get stronger, to which Po-M has a possible solution in the form of Nephilim Technology: SoNs technology that was recovered and reverse-engineered by U-Tokio before its destruction, far more powerful than conventional weapons. Cherbourg is also NephTech, so she gives Talis a device that can detect its pieces, along with other components of NephTech weaponry to assist him in battle.

While searching U-Tokio's tunnels for components of Cherbourg, Talis discovers a girl with a tail floating in a preservation chamber. Upon waking, the girl, named Ittica, goes with Talis back to Iron Base, and later reveals that she is a genetically engineered human-animal hybrid called a "Mute" which possesses the ability to shapeshift. Once all the components to Cherbourg are gathered, the team returns to base to assemble it. Toni confesses her feelings for Talis, but Talis turns her away, stating that he is aware of Yokky's feelings for Toni and does not want to hurt him, and reveals to her the extent of his body's conversion by the nanobots, stating that he does not have much time left. Yokky hears the conversation and, realizing Toni is in love with Talis, becomes conflicted about his self-confidence.

Cherbourg is assembled, and successfully tested, but the test attracts the attention of the SoNs. Realizing that the SoNs are now aware of Iron Base's power, they track the source of the attacks to an abandoned military fortress formerly used by U-Tokio, now being used as a staging point and resource stockpile by the SoNs; after finding evidence of the Catastropus, they realize it has set its sights on the upgraded Iron Base. After shutting the fortress down to prevent the SoNs from using it, they return to Iron Base to prepare their next move. Yokky and Toni, with the assistance of Maria and Ittica respectively, come to terms with their feelings and insecurity, and the citizens of Iron Base steel themselves in preparation for the final battle.

Aware that Catastropus is now en route, the team forms a plan: With Cherbourg in place, the Catastropus will be preoccupied attempting to break through it, and will leave itself unguarded for a close-range attack carried out by Talis and his team. With his team, Talis breaks through the Catastropus' vanguard and destroys the Catastropus itself, avenging his family and the people of Dystokio. Following the battle, Talis makes preparations to leave and seek out more survivors. Yokky joins him, and after getting a farewell from the citizens of Iron Base and a promise that they will always be a home for them to return to, the two depart in the tank Talis originally arrived in.

After the credits, Talis and Yokky encounter Toni, who wishes to join them. After a moment of consideration, Talis smiles, and accepts her into the team.

After the game, the player has the option of starting a New Game Plus in two different modes: Story Mode, which replays the story with all player progression and items but locking certain plot-related vehicles and equipment, and Hunter Mode, which allows the player to start with all progression, vehicles, and equipment while minimizing the story, allowing the player to focus on hunting monsters and collecting bounties.

== Characters ==
Talis: A young man dubbed "humanity's last monster hunter". Having lost his mother and later his adopted father to the SoNs, he is determined to hunt down and destroy every last SoN to avenge them. Despite appearing human besides his mechanical left arm, he is actually almost completely cybernetic due to nanites in his arm converting his body into a machine, and his drive to destroy the SoNs comes from a need to do so before the cybernetic conversion destroys what is left of "himself".

Yokky: A former alcoholic and protege to Iron Base's head mechanic. Orphaned by the war against the SoNs and adopted by Iron Base, he fell in love with a girl in Iron Town but was too shy to approach her, and when she apparently perished in Iron Town's destruction, he lost all faith in life and turned to drinking. When Toni is discovered to be alive, he quits drinking and romantically pursues her again, but his shyness and lack of experience in girls causes his feelings to go unrequited.

Toni: The lone survivor of Iron Town's destruction, and the girl that was the object of Yokky's affection. Her father was a prominent trader within Iron Town, but he was killed when the SoNs attacked and destroyed Iron Town and she was taken captive by a giant spider-like SoN. After being rescued by Talis, she joins Iron Base, and develops feelings for him, feelings that, like those of her admirer Yokky, go unrequited.

Dylan: A former bandit leader that was notorious for harassing Iron Town for supplies before the SoNs wiped out his gang. After being rescued by Talis and taken to Iron Base, he was grudgingly allowed to stay. He is possessed of a brash, crude demeanor, often coming into conflict with the calmer members of the team, but he does appreciate the second chance he was given, and fights loyally by Talis' side.

Misaki: An academic medic who wanders the wastes of Distokio, searching the ruins for what remains of humanity's knowledge. He is usually polite, calm, and mild-mannered, preferring only to get into a fight when absolutely necessary, but he is not afraid to speak out against those who irritate him, namely Dylan, whose crude manners and boisterous attitude often conflict with his quiet nature. His long hair, feminine features, and slender body results in him initially being mistaken for a woman.

Maria: The last of a squad of soldiers tasked with defending a massive U-Tokio book repository. Referred to as an "immortal" soldier, her actual age is unknown, but she has been alive since the destruction of U-Tokio several decades ago, and has lived in the repository since, defending it from besieging SoNs. Boisterous but friendly, she nevertheless has grown wise from her years fighting, and approaches life casually, especially when it comes to intimacy.

Ittica: A genetically engineered mutant girl known as a "Mute", discovered in suspended animation by Talis while searching for components of Cherbourg. She is energetic and rambunctious, using her ability to shapeshift into duplicates of other people to play pranks and cause trouble, though she ultimately means well and does not intentionally try to cause harm. She is known to also possess a voracious appetite due to her time spent in stasis without food.

D'Annunzio: Iron Base's manager, an experienced special operations veteran who also runs Iron Base's bar and item shop. Witnessing the SoNs' methodical extermination of humans has made him world-weary under his sassy demeanor, but he still holds hope for humanity and believes that it is never too late to start rebuilding.

Jingoro: The cantankerous and elderly head mechanic of Iron Base. He has an almost perverse love for tanks, and heads the modification and weapons/tank development function of Iron Base. He adopted an orphaned Yokky when the boy was young, training him to be his protege. He is a strict teacher, but he genuinely cares for Yokky, and recognizes the great potential the young mechanic possesses.

Po-M: An android created after the Great Annihilation (Po-M being an abbreviation for Post-Mankind) she is the logistics officer for the Iron Base. She is quiet, but friendly and cheerful, and has a love of poetry. In the field, she serves as Talis' guide, synchronizing travel points and providing information about landmarks and wasteland creatures.

U-Tokio: A former underground city created in the massive tunnels under Distokio. Formed by survivors and military officials who fled underground during the Great Annihilation, U-Tokio expanded the tunnels and formed into a thriving community. U-Tokio was destroyed when a failed military operation to retake sectors of the surface allowed for the SoNs to access the tunnels, and now only exists as ruins.

SoNs: An abbreviation of "Spawn of NOA", SoNs are machines designed and built by the supercomputer NOA for the express purpose of destroying human civilization. They were not originally meant to completely eradicate humanity, only to destroy their society and prevent it from rebuilding and once more polluting the planet. When NOA was defeated, it sent a final message to all SoNs to drive humanity to extinction as revenge.

Catastropus: A colossal, heavily armored SoN capable of destroying entire cities that prowls Distokio, following its last commands from NOA to destroy humanity completely. Both Talis and the Iron Base seek their revenge against it since it is responsible for countless deaths and the near-extinction of Humanity in the Distokio area.

NOA: A massive, hyper-intelligent supercomputer developed by Vlad Corp in order to solve the issue of mounting ecological disasters plaguing humanity. NOA eventually gained sentience and determined that humanity was to blame for the disasters, and triggered the Great Annihilation in an attempt to wipe out human civilization. NOA was eventually defeated by a monster hunter, but with its last moments of life it sent a message to its creations to destroy humanity completely.

== Development and release ==
Metal Max Xeno was first teased in October 2017 via a trailer published by PlayStation Official YouTube channel with the subtitle "True End of Century, Born". A week later, Kadokawa Games confirmed the existence of the game in Japanese magazine Dengeki PlayStation, which announced the game was set to be released for PlayStation 4 and PlayStation Vita in Q1 2018. The character art was handled by Hentai artist, Non Oda.

After Metal Max 4: Gekkō no Diva was released, series creator Hiroshi Miyaoka got acquainted with a brand new team to develop the mobile game Metal Max: Fireworks. They subsequently decided to develop a new home console game in the series. Considering Metal Max 4 featured a variety of elements from the series and ended up having poor sales, Miyaoka decided to go "back to basics" for the series, deciding to create a different kind of Metal Max game, thus commencing the development of Metal Max Xeno. The Japanese version was released on 19 April 2018, while the North American and the European versions launched in September.

A remake of the game with enhanced visuals, an ATB system, and altered vehicle physics titled Metal Max Xeno: Reborn was released in Japan for Nintendo Switch and PlayStation 4 on 10 September 2020. The game was released worldwide on 10 June 2022 for Microsoft Windows, Nintendo Switch, and PlayStation 4. The remake was developed by 24Frame and Kadokawa Games, and was published by Clouded Leopard Entertainment in Japan and by PQube for its worldwide release.

A sequel, Metal Max: Wild West, was slated for release in 2022, but was later cancelled.

== Reception ==
Reception

Aggregate score
Aggregator	Score
Metacritic	PS4: 61/100; NS: 72/100; PS4 (Reborn): 75/100

Review scores
Publication	Score
RPGamer	2/5
RPGFan	40/100

According to review aggregator website Metacritic Metal Max Xeno received "mixed or average" reviews. According to Gematsu, the game sold 50,000 copies in its first two days. Famitsu scored the game a 31 out of 40.
