= Metal Max (video game) =

1991 video game

- Famicom box art
- Developers: Crea-Tech; Data East; Kuusoukagaku (SNES)
- Publisher: Data East
- Producer: Shoji Masuda
- Designer: Hiroshi Miyaoka
- Composer: Satoshi Kadokura
- Series: Metal Max
- Platforms: Family Computer; Super Famicom
- Release: Family Computer: JP: May 24, 1991; Super Famicom: JP: September 29, 1995
- Genre: Role-playing video game
- Mode: Single-player

Metal Max (Note: Japanese: メタルマックス, Hepburn: Metaru Makkusu) is a role-playing video game developed by Crea-Tech and Data East and published by Data East for the Famicom. It is the first game in the Metal Max series.

Metal Max is set in a futuristic post-apocalyptic world, where the surviving humans cluster in underground villages and ruins while "monster hunters" fight the monsters and outlaws outside. The game received a sequel, Metal Max 2, and was remade for the Super Famicom as Metal Max Returns. A direct sequel, Metal Saga: Season of Steel, was published in 2006 for Nintendo DS.

== Gameplay ==
In battle, the first character is inside the tank, and the second one battles without one.

Metal Max was an early example of an open-ended and non-linear role-playing video game. It lacked a predetermined story path, but the player was instead given the choice of which missions to follow in whatever order while being able to visit any place in the game world. The ending can be determined by the player, who can alter the ending through their actions, complete the game at almost any time, and can continue playing the game even after the ending.

The gameplay is classic RPG fare: the characters travel from town to town, having random encounters on the way, upgrading items and tanks as they go. The object is to become a well-known and respected hunter by defeating the monsters with bounties on their heads, which can be done in any order the player pleases. There is a surprisingly rich storyline, but as it is not forced on the player it must be actively sought out. A large part of the game is customizing tanks: tank parts can be bought or found, and the parts, as well as the tank itself, can all be modified. The player uses a BS-Controller (BS-Con), a personal computer system, to track data about things such as towns, tanks, bounties and experience points. Combat is turn-based. There are a large number of miscellaneous items, weapons and upgrades, most with unique or uncommon capabilities.

Each playable character has their own character class, such as mechanic or soldier, and these characters fight in turn-based battles either on foot or using tanks. The player can create tanks, customize them and make a variety of modifications to them, remodel and enhance each part, strengthen the defense, repair damaged parts, and give them more shells.

=== Tank ===
A unique characteristic of Metal Max is the Vehicle system. In this game, each character can ride a vehicle and there are 8 different vehicles that can be collected. A vehicle protects the driver from physical damage and can be equipped with weapons.

Each vehicle has their own exclusive chassis. A vehicle's loading capacity is decided by the maximum power of the equipped engine. All parts besides plate armor have a certain weight so if the vehicle becomes overloaded or the engine is damaged, it will be unable to move. Every vehicle can be equipped with a C-Unit (Computer-Unit), a fire control system that affects the hit rate of equipped weapons. The above two are necessary for vehicles so if one of these becomes broken or unequipped, the vehicle will be unable to move by itself.

A vehicle can have between 0-3 slots on its chassis that can accept a certain class of weapon. The weapon's are divided into three classes: Cannons, Machine guns, and Special weapons. Cannons are powerful, but have limited ammunition. Machine guns have unlimited ammunition and can hit multiple enemies but are weak. Special weapons are both powerful and can hit multiple enemies, but can be heavy and tend to run out of ammunition very quickly.

== Setting ==
The game is set an unknown number of years after the fall of modern human civilization due to actions of Noah. The survivors clustered into villages or began to live among the ruins, and those who fought the monsters and robots outside became known as monster hunters. These men and women salvage tanks and tank parts in order to defeat monsters and outlaws and collect bounties on them. Although the previous civilization has been ruined, the environment is not as desolate as many post-apocalyptic settings, with plentiful trees and water.

=== Characters ===
- The Hunter: The main character, a young man who dreams of becoming a monster hunter. His name is revealed to be Rebanna in the sequel Metal Saga: Season of Steel.
- The Mechanic: A young man who wants to travel the world and become a great tank mechanic.
- The Soldier: A rough woman who hopes to best her rival, Red Wolf.
- Hunter's Dad: A gruff tank mechanic who disowns his son over his wild and impractical ambitions.
- Dr. Minchi: A doctor who resurrects characters by electric shock.
- Red Wolf: A mysterious hunter who drives a bright red tank.
- Noah: A supercomputer that was made by scientists in the hope that it can work out a solution to saving the earth's environment. By analyzing more and more data and recalculating every possibility, it "awoke" and brought about the apocalypse upon the conclusion that destroying humanity is the only way of saving the earth.

=== Tanks ===
- Mosquito: The first tank that the hunter finds.
- Buggy: Found at the derrick factory in the world's south-east corner.
- Van: Can recover character's HP while move in the world.
- Tiger: A WW2-vintage tank that is buried somewhere in the beach cave.
- LAV: An 6x6 wheeled APC that is found in Sol town.
- Abrams: A tank that is sold in the port of a slum.
- Red Wolf: Character Red Wolf's tank.
- White Muu: A Next-Generation MBT Prototype that is locked inside the Ghost Base.

== Release ==
The game was released in Japan on May 24, 1991 for the Nintendo Famicom home console and was published by Data East. A Super Famicom remake of the game, titled Metal Max Returns (メタルマックス リターンズ), was released on September 29, 1995. It features improved graphics and sound, new bounties and items, new and revised areas, references to Metal Max 2 and decreased difficulty. It also contains many elements that were later found in Metal Saga on the PlayStation 2. A Game Boy Advance port of Metal Max Returns, called Metal Max Returns Kai, was later announced by Now Production for 2003 but was never released commercially. The original Famicom version was later re-released on the Wii Virtual Console on April 27, 2010, and the 3DS Virtual Console on January 1, 2013. Returns was re-released on the Wii Virtual Console on November 15, 2011.

Metal Max sold 150,000 copies in Japan. For Metal Max Returns, more than 170 thousand copies of this game were sold at a price of 12,800 yen per copy (the equivalent of US$165).

While Metal Max Returns was never released in the West, a full fan translation was released by Aeon Genesis in 2007. The original Metal Max was also fan translated in 2018.
