= Metal Max 4: Gekkō no Diva =

2013 video game

- Developers: Cattle Call; 24Frame
- Publisher: Kadokawa Games
- Directors: Tomoki Tauchi; Yūsuke Tomono
- Designer: Hiroshi Miyaoka
- Artists: Atsuji Yamamoto; Shun Kise
- Composer: Satoshi Kadokura
- Series: Metal Max
- Platform: Nintendo 3DS
- Release: JP: 7 November 2013
- Genre: Role-playing
- Mode: Single-player

Metal Max 4: Gekkō no Diva (Note: Japanese: メタルマックス4 月光のディーヴァ, Hepburn: lit. "Metaru Makkusu Fō Gekkō no Dīva; Metal Max 4: Diva of the Moonlight") is an entry in the Metal Max series (besides the Metal Saga series). It is a Japanese open world, nonlinear, vehicle combat role-playing video game published by Kadokawa Games for Nintendo 3DS on 7 November 2013. The game was developed by Cattle Call and 24Frame. Animation produced by Studio 4°C.

== Synopsis ==
The story takes place 50 years after the destruction of human civilizations by mad supercomputer Noah. The protagonist (default name "Hinata") is a young boy who is living peacefully with his foster sister Sasha and foster father Gib in desert islands. One day, a group of mysterious army attack their island. The protagonist and Sasha escape but Gib captures them.

Sasha tells the protagonist that Gib and he were "Hot Seeds", the project of sealing human survivors in hibernation chambers since 50 years ago, in order to preserve mankind and restore the human civilization after the "Great Destruction". Sasha reveals herself to be an android tasked to protect both Gib and the protagonist.

The motivation of the villains to catch Gib is to unseal the ultimate weapon "Black Mole" (クロモグラ), an "indestructible" mobile fortress that was created to fight against Noah, and Gib was one of the creators of it. Therefore, the protagonist have to save Gib to prevent the villains to lay hands on the "Black Mole".

== Development and release ==
Metal Max 4 is the first title in the main series to use 3D graphics and voice acting. A limited edition included an original soundtrack CD, a microfiber cloth, a comic by Atsuji Yamamoto, and a DLC pack.

== Reception ==
Famitsu rated game a 35/40.
