= Dungeon Encounters =

2021 video game

- Developer: Cattle Call
- Publisher: Square Enix
- Director: Hiroyuki Ito
- Producer: Hiroaki Kato
- Designer: Hiroyuki Ito
- Programmers: Kazuki Takei; Toya Uchida; Hiroyuki Kito
- Writer: Hiroyuki Ito
- Composer: Nobuo Uematsu
- Platforms: Nintendo Switch; PlayStation 4; Windows
- Release: November 14, 2021
- Genre: Role-playing
- Mode: Single-player

Dungeon Encounters is a 2021 role-playing video game developed by Square Enix and Cattle Call and published by Square Enix. It was released for Nintendo Switch, PlayStation 4, and Windows.

At the time of its release, Dungeon Encounters was the first game Hiroyuki Ito had directed in 14 years. The game received positive reviews from critics for its minimalist approach to gameplay.

== Gameplay ==
Dungeon Encounters is a single-player role-playing video game with strategy and dungeon crawl elements. The player controls a party of four members, and must venture through each of the 100-floor dungeon and reach the bottom level. Before entering the dungeon, players can visit shops and purchase weapons, armor, and abilities.

The game has minimalist presentation and gameplay, lacking proper visuals, story, and complicated systems like stamina or hunger. Instead, the dungeon is composed of the board game-like layout with squares and branching paths. Stepping on numbered squares triggers either an event or a battle. White numbers represent a special encounter, providing character abilities, treasure chests, or an opportunity to heal the party. Black numbers represent enemy encounters, with player characters initiating battle.

Battles are progressed through the Active Time Battle system. Each player or enemy unit has a meter that must fill to trigger their turn. In each turn, a unit can launch an attack with their equipped weapon or one of the party's abilities. Each unit has a Physical and Magical Defense number, which are numerical soaks that prevent physical and magical damage. These must be fully exhausted before attacks can reduce the unit's health point, as even a single point remaining in the defense will block damage.

== Development and release ==
Dungeon Encounters was published by Square Enix and developed by Cattle Call, known for the Metal Max series and The Legend of Legacy. The development team included several Final Fantasy veteran figures, such as director Hiroyuki Ito, producer Hiroaki Kato, character designer Ryoma Ito, and composer Nobuo Uematsu.

Despite visual similarities, Ito and Kato denied that tabletop games were inspiration for the game. However, both developers agreed that tabletop games and Dungeon Encounters do share the universal fun of the role-playing games.

Dungeon Encounters was first announced at Tokyo Game Show 2021, two weeks before its release date, 14 October 2021. It was released for PlayStation 4, Nintendo Switch, and Microsoft Windows via Steam.

== Reception ==
Reception

Aggregate score
Aggregator	Score
Metacritic	NS: 81/100; PC: 60/100; PS4: 82/100

Dungeon Encounters received "generally favorable reviews" for its PlayStation 4 and Switch versions, according to Metacritic. The Windows version received "mixed or average reviews".

Jenni Lada of Siliconera rated the Switch version 8/10 points, calling the game "made for the Switch" due to how it rewards the player for taking notes. Saying it was one of her best surprises of 2021, she commented that its looks were deceptive compared to how deep the game was and that she never had a short session.

Roland Ingram of Nintendo Life rated the Switch version 8/10 stars, saying that it was more meaningful than other games despite its simple graphics. Calling it a "masterstroke of game design, character and narrative", he praised the game's storytelling, but criticized its music as repetitive, and the concept as not particularly novel.

Adam Vitale of RPG Site rated the PC version 8/10 points, calling it "not for everyone" and criticizing its music as "squawky", but calling its design "tight-knit" and "well-crafted". He compared it to "a third-person Wizardry, only even simpler".

== Future ==
Kato said in an interview Dungeon Encounters is complete and there were no plans for any future updates, but he and Ito showed interest in producing a sequel. Ito also considered releasing an easy version of the game, similar to Final Fantasy IV.
