= Atsuji =

- Gender: Male

Origin
- Origin: Japanese
- Meaning: Different meanings depending on the kanji used

Atsuji (written: 厚次 or 貴嗣) is a masculine Japanese given name. Notable people with the name include:

- Atsuji Miyahara (宮原 厚次; born 1958), Japanese sport wrestler
- Atsuji Yamamoto (山本 貴嗣; born 1959), Japanese manga artist and character designer
