= Cattle Call (company) =

Japanese game developer

Cattle Call Inc.
- Native name: 株式会社キャトルコール
- Romanized name: Kabushiki gaisha kyatoru kooru
- Type: Kabushiki gaisha
- Industry: Video games
- Founded: March 20, 1998; 28 years ago
- Headquarters: Nakano, Tokyo Prefecture, Japan
- Products: Console games
- Number of employees: 46
- Website: www.cattle-call.co.jp

Cattle Call Inc. is a Japanese game developer based in Tokyo, Japan. The company was established by former staff of Data East Corporation and is engaged in developing original console games as well as co-developing and porting games for other game companies.

The company is known for developing the (partially) Japan-exclusive Metal Max series and the 3DS role-playing games The Legend of Legacy and its sequel, The Alliance Alive.

== History ==
In 1998, Data East Corporation, a Japanese video game and electronic engineering company based in Tokyo, withdrew entirely from the arcade industry and reported a total debt estimated at ¥3.3 billion. The company then filed for reorganization in the following year and stopped making video games altogether. As a result of the corporate reorganization, some of the staff from the company formed Cattle Call Inc. to continue developing video games.

== Games developed by Cattle Call ==
=== PlayStation 2 ===
Title	Original release date	Publisher(s)	JP	NA	EU	AUS
Tsugunai: Atonement	JP: February 22, 2001; NA: November 29, 2001	JP: Sony Interactive Entertainment; NA: Atlus	Yes	Yes	No	No
Arc the Lad: Twilight of the Spirits (JP: Arc the Lad: Seirei no Tasogare)	JP: March 20, 2003; NA: June 25, 2003; EU: January 30, 2004	WW: Sony Interactive Entertainment	Yes	Yes	Yes	No
Arc the Lad: End of Darkness (JP: Arc the Lad: Generation)	JP: November 3, 2004; NA: June 14, 2005	JP: Sony Interactive Entertainment; NA: Namco	Yes	Yes	No	No

=== Nintendo DS ===
Title	Original release date	Publisher(s)	JP	NA	EU	AUS	KOR
Dragon Quest IV (co-developed with ArtePiazza)	JP: November 22, 2007; NA: September 16, 2008; EU: September 12, 2008	WW: Square Enix	Yes	Yes	Yes	Yes	No
Nanatsuiro★Drops DS Touch de Hajimaru Hatsukoi Monogatari	JP: May 15, 2008	JP: ASCII Media Works	Yes	No	No	No	No
Disney Stitch Jam (JP: Stitch! DS: Ohana to Rhythm de Daibouken)	JP: December 3, 2009; NA: March 23, 2010	WW: Disney Interactive Studios	Yes	Yes	No	No	No
Kamonohashi Kamo - Aimai Seikatsu no Susume	JP: December 3, 2009	JP: ASCII Media Works	Yes	No	No	No	No
Kokoro Nuri e (DSiWare)	JP: April 7, 2010	JP: Nintendo	Yes	No	No	No	No
Metal Max 3	JP: July 29, 2010	JP: Kadokawa Games, Enterbrain, Crea-Tech	Yes	No	No	No	No
Motto! Stitch! DS: Rhythm de Rakugaki Daisakusen	JP: November 18, 2010	JP: Disney Interactive Studios	Yes	No	No	No	No
Usavich: Game no Jikan	JP: December 8, 2011	JP: Bandai Namco Games	Yes	No	No	No	No
Metal Max 2 ReLOADED	JP: December 8, 2011	JP: Kadokawa Games, Enterbrain	Yes	No	No	No	No
Tokumei Sentai Go-Busters (co-developed with Aspect Co.)	JP: September 27, 2012; KOR: August 8, 2013	JP: Bandai Namco Entertainment; KOR: Daewon Media	Yes	No	No	No	Yes

=== Nintendo 3DS ===
Title	Original release date	Publisher(s)	JP	NA	EU	AUS
Isamugengaisha Brave Company	JP: October 27, 2011	JP: Bandai Namco Entertainment, Banpresto	Yes	No	No	No
Metal Max 4: Gekkō no Diva (co-developed with 24Frame)	JP: November 7, 2013	JP: Kadokawa Games, Enterbrain	Yes	No	No	No
The Legend of Legacy (co-developed with Grezzo and FuRyu)	JP: January 22, 2015; NA: October 13, 2015; PAL: February 5, 2016	JP: FuRyu; NA: Atlus USA; PAL: NIS America	Yes	Yes	Yes	Yes
The Alliance Alive (co-developed with Grezzo and FuRyu)	JP: June 22, 2017; WW: March 27, 2018	JP: FuRyu; WW: Atlus USA	Yes	Yes	Yes	No

=== Wii ===
Title	Original release date	Publisher(s)	JP	NA	EU	AUS
Space Invaders Get Even (WiiWare) (JP: Space Invaders Get Even: Gyakushuu no Space Invaders, co-developed with Taito)	JP: August 26, 2008; EU: November 7, 2008; NA: December 1, 2008	JP: Taito; WW: Square Enix	Yes	Yes	Yes	No
Opoona (co-developed with ArtePiazza)	JP: November 1, 2007; NA: March 25, 2008; EU: September 12, 2008; AU: September 25, 2008	WW: Koei	Yes	Yes	Yes	Yes

=== PlayStation 3 ===
Title	Original release date	Publisher(s)	JP	NA	EU	AUS
Namco Museum Essentials (PlayStation Network) (JP: Namco Museum.comm, co-developed with Bandai Namco Entertainment)	JP: January 29, 2009; NA: July 16, 2009; PAL: April 1, 2010	WW: Bandai Namco Entertainment	Yes	Yes	Yes	Yes

=== PlayStation 4 ===
Title	Original release date	Publisher(s)	JP	NA	EU	AUS
Metal Max Xeno (co-developed with Kadokawa Games and 24Frame)	JP: April 19, 2018; WW: September 25, 2018	JP: Kadokawa Games; WW: NIS America	Yes	Yes	Yes	Yes
Dungeon Encounters	WW: November 14, 2021	WW: Square Enix	Yes	Yes	Yes	Yes

=== Nintendo Switch ===
Title	Original release date	Publisher(s)	JP	NA	EU	AUS
Dungeon Encounters	WW: November 14, 2021	WW: Square Enix	Yes	Yes	Yes	Yes

=== Microsoft Windows ===
Title	Original release date	Publisher(s)	JP	NA	EU	AUS
Dungeon Encounters	WW: November 14, 2021	WW: Square Enix	Yes	Yes	Yes	Yes

=== Nintendo Switch 2 ===
Title	Original release date	Publisher(s)	JP	NA	EU	AUS
Bravely Default Flying Fairy HD Remaster	WW: June 5, 2025	WW: Square Enix	Yes	Yes	Yes	Yes
