= Metal Max: Wild Eyes =

- Developer(s): Crea-Tech
- Publisher(s): ASCII Entertainment
- Director(s): Hiroshi Miyaoka
- Artist(s): Atsuji Yamamoto
- Series: Metal Max
- Platform(s): Dreamcast
- Release: JP: Cancelled
- Genre(s): Role-playing

Metal Max: Wild Eyes (メタルマックス ワイルドアイズ, Metaru Makkusu Wuirudo Aizu) is a cancelled role-playing video game of the Metal Max series and was originally planned to be published on Dreamcast by ASCII Entertainment in winter 2000. The game started development in 1999 with a tentative title "Metal Max Overdrive", which was announced at Tokyo Game Show. Owing to ASCII withdrawn from home video game console business and many other reasons, the game was never released. Similar as its predecessor Metal Max 2, its characters also featured three people with a dog. Officially announced plot is "the grandest love story of the series". Metal Max Wild Eyes is the first game of series to feature 3D graphics. The next game in the Metal Max series that was actually released on PlayStation 2, Metal Saga, was released in 2005, which also featured 3D graphics.

Metal Max Xeno released in 2018 on PS4 and PS Vita is based on cancelled Metal Max: Wild Eyes.
