= Metal Max: Fireworks =

2015 video game

- Developers: Kadokawa; Crea-Tech
- Publisher: JP: Kadokawa
- Series: Metal Max
- Platforms: iOS, Android
- Release: iOS: JP: 8 October 2015; Android: JP: 28 October 2015
- Genre: Role-playing

Metal Max: Fireworks (メタルマックス ファイアーワークス, Metaru Makkusu Faiāwākusu) is a role-playing video game, which was developed and published by Japanese company Kadokawa for Android and iOS. It is the first mobile game in the original series.

== Gameplay ==
Metal Max: Fireworks is a role-playing video game featured "monsters vs. tanks". Similar as its predecessors, players needs to battle with enemies by themselves or by vehicles.

Fireworks features tank customization system. The player tank is made from three different parts of the body, engine, and CPU. They determine the tank's stats like weight. The player also equips their tanks with weapons, which are used to battle enemies. The player takes one of the teams, composed of three units, into missions.

== Development ==
Metal Saga: Fireworks was first announced in July 2015.
