= Ultimate Teacher =

Japanese manga series by Atsuji Yamamoto

最終教師 (Saishuu Kyoushi)
- Manga
- Written by: Atsuji Yamamoto
- Published by: Tokuma Shoten
- Magazine: Just Comic
- Original run: 1981 – 1983
- Volumes: 2
- Original video animation
- Directed by: Toyoo Ashida
- Produced by: Nagateru Katō; Yasuhisa Kazama; Masaki Sawanobori
- Written by: Monta Ibu
- Music by: Kow Otani
- Studio: J.C.Staff
- Licensed by: NA: Central Park Media; EU: Manga Entertainment
- Released: February 6, 1988
- Runtime: 56 minutes
- icon

Ultimate Teacher (Japanese: 最終教師, Hepburn: Saishuu Kyoushi) is a 1981 Japanese manga series written and illustrated by Atsuji Yamamoto. A 1988 OVA directed by Toyoo Ashida was produced by J.C.Staff. It was released on February 6, 1988, and was released in English by Manga Entertainment and Central Park Media.

== Plot ==
Emperor High School seems to not care anymore about education, letting their students have free rein over nearly everything. The president even had to resort to teachers who came right out of a prison, because the students were so violent. One day, Ganpachi, a self declared teacher arrives, intending to bring order to this high school by introducing fear into the leader of all the gangs, Hinako. Having a hard time standing up against him, she still believes in the power of her lucky kitty gym pants.

As it turns out Ganpachi ran away from a genetic laboratory, which is probably why he has the tenacity and behavior of a cockroach.

== Cast ==
The Ultimate Teacher cast
Role	Japanese	English	
Role	Japanese	World Wide Group (1993)	Ocean Studios (1996)
Ganpachi Chabane	Naoto Takenaka	Marc Smith	Scott McNeil
Hinako Shiratori	Hiroko Kasahara	Annemarie Lawless	Kelly Sheridan
Professor Karima	Yuusaku Yara	John Guerrasio	Robert O. Smith
Kansuke Matsuri	Keiichi Nanba	Adam Henderson	Shane Meier
Ryuuichi Watanabe	Shin'ya Ootaki	Stuart Milligan	Ward Perry
Umekichi	Naoki Tatsuta	Kerry Shale	Scott McNeil
Principal Suzuki	Ichirou Nagai	Harry Ditson	Michael Dobson
Pine Homeroom Boss	Shouzou Iidzuka	John Bull	Michael Dobson
Shopkeeper	Kouichi Yamadera	William Dufris	Robert O. Smith
Lead Researcher	Norio Wakamoto		
Researcher	Nobuo Tobita		
Wrestler	Miki Itou		

== Reception ==
On Anime News Network, Justin Sevakis said that "the animation is about TV quality for the era, meaning flat colors and virtually no detail, but a full range of motion that handles the speed required for such rapid-fire comedy."
