= Break 'Em All =

2005 video game

- Developer: Warashi
- Publisher: D3 Publisher
- Platform: Nintendo DS
- Release: JP: October 27, 2005; NA: June 20, 2006; EU: September 29, 2006
- Genre: Breakout clone
- Modes: Single-player, multiplayer

Break 'Em All, (Note: Known in Japan as Simple DS Series Vol. 4: The Block Kuzushi (SIMPLE DSシリーズ Vol.4 THE ブロックくずし, Shinpuru Dii Esu Shiriizu Boryuumu Yon Za Burokku Kuzushi; Simple DS Series Vol. 4: The Block Destruction)) known as Brick 'Em All DS in Europe, is an Arkanoid clone released in 2005 for the Nintendo DS. The game features several single-player modes, as well as single-cart multiplayer for up to 8 players. The game utilized the system's touch screen to control the paddle, as well as activate power-ups. Power-Ups can be activated by pressing up on the D-Pad or by pressing the X Button.

The game was originally released on October 27, 2005, in Japan as part of the "Simple DS" line of products. D3 Publisher released a localized version of the game in North America under the name Break 'Em All in 2006.

== Game modes ==
=== Tokoton Mode ===
Screenshot from the Standard Play variation of Tokoton Mode

Tokoton mode is one of the two single-player modes in the game. It has two play options: "Standard Play" and "Random Play". Standard play consists of fifty stages. As the player progresses through the stages, they begin to gain levels. The player begins at the "amoeba" level and slowly works their way to the "superior being" level. In "Random Play", the game randomly generates each level, with a total of over 3,000,000 different combinations. In Tokoton Mode, the player is given three lives at the beginning, and can earn more as the game progresses.

=== Quest Mode ===
The game's second single-player mode is Quest Mode. Quest Mode consists of twelve levels, with each level having three regular stages and one special boss stage. To defeat the boss, the player must find and exploit its weak point. Quest Mode can also be played multiplayer, with up to four players connecting to the host via DS Download Play. The host selects the stage, and the player completing it fastest is crowned the winner.

=== Survival Mode ===
Survival Mode is the game's multiplayer mode. Up to eight players can participate via DS Download Play. At the beginning of the round, they each chose one of four unique paddles to play as. Each paddle is shaped differently from the standard flat paddle found in most Breakout-style games. This mode chooses to forego the normal Arkanoid brick-breaking mode of play. Instead, players must protect their central core from balls flying at them. When hit, the core changes from green to yellow, then to red, before destroying the player. After some time, one of the flying balls will change into a "Lucky Ball", granting invincibility to the first player that hits it. After the Lucky Ball is hit, it immediately changes into a "Life Ball", reverting the hit paddle's Core to its original green state. The last player to survive the round without their core being hit while red is the winner.

== Regional differences ==
The Japanese version has an option to turn on/off the backlight, which is missing from the Western releases.

== Reception ==
Nintendo DS
Publication	Score
1UP.com	C+
Game Informer	75/100
GameSpot	6.3/10
IGN	6.5/10
Nintendo Power	7/10

The game holds a 68/100 rating at Metacritic. Weekly Famitsu scored the game a 23 out of 40.
