= Triggerheart Exelica =

2006 video game

- Arcade flyer featuring Exelica and Crultear
- Developers: Warashi; Gulti / P.A. Works (PS2)
- Publishers: Warashi; Alchemist (PS2); Cosmo Machia (Switch)
- Composer: Masahiro Kajihara
- Platforms: Arcade, Dreamcast, Xbox 360 (XBLA), i-mode, PlayStation 2, Nintendo Switch
- Release: May 2006: Arcade; JP: May 2006; Dreamcast; JP: February 22, 2007; Xbox 360; WW: February 27, 2008; i-mode; JP: December 1, 2008; PlayStation 2; JP: March 26, 2009; Nintendo Switch; WW: December 14, 2023
- Genre: vertical scrolling shooter
- Mode: Single player
- Arcade system: Sega NAOMI

Triggerheart Exelica (Note: Japanese: トリガーハート エグゼリカ, Hepburn: Torigāhāto Eguzerika) is a vertically scrolling shooter video game developed and published by Warashi for arcades. The game was first released in Japanese arcades in May 2006, and was later ported to the Dreamcast, becoming the system's penultimate licensed title when it was released in Japan on February 22, 2007—only two weeks prior to Karous.

== Gameplay ==
The game involves playing 1 of 2 anthropomorphic fighters to battle against 5 stages of enemy ships. Exelica specializes in wide area attacks, while Crueltear uses concentrated front shots. Players can fire anchors to catch enemy ships, then use the caught unit as a shield or throw it to inflict more damage.

Triggerhearts

The player controlled units are anthropomorphic fighters in leotard outfits called Spec Suits.

- TH60 EXELICA: Wide forward area shots, medium movement, slow anchor traction
- TH32 CRUELTEAR: Concentrated front shots, fast movement, fast anchor traction
- TH44 FAINTEAR: Laser worm shot, faster movement, fast anchor traction

TH44 Faintear is now a player selectable character.

Omelette, Watt, Triggerheart Backupper C'r_na, Skiltall (also called "Skilltor"), originally only part of story concept, now appears in the game.

Other new elements include event CG, story mode and an opening movie. The opening theme is "Gravity Error" by Ayane.

V.B.A.S. (Variable Boss Attack System)

Like Zanac, this game dynamically adjusts difficulty based on the player's in-game performance. It affects the difficulty of game bosses. If player collects more score items, the harder the bosses will be to defeat.

== Plot ==
In an unknown alien galaxy far away from the Milky Way, a war is waging between the Tilde Fleet, a group of human-like people and mysteriously violent robotic vehicles known as the Ver'mith led by the mysterious young woman Faintear. Two humanoid-soldiers belonging to the Triggerheart strike team, Exelica and programmed sister Crueltear, were busily fighting the Ver'mith during an attack when a portal opened and sucked the two young women in. Materializing on planet Earth, Exelica and Crueltear soon made Earth their new home as they had no means of return until a new portal opened and the Ver'mith appeared. Intent on making Earth their primary fortress of attack, the Ver'mith quickly make short work of Earth's Defenses. Earth's only hope rests on the Triggerheart sisters.

== Releases ==
=== Dreamcast release ===
The Dreamcast version added a story mode and an arrange mode. Arrange mode has an increased difficulty level and does not have continues.

There are two distinct versions being released: a regular version and a limited edition, which includes a soundtrack and guide book. Early orders from Sega Direct also included a phone card, and poster.

Although officially released only in Japan, it can be enjoyed by players from other countries because most of the menus are in English with Japanese subtitles. However a Dreamcast boot disc will be needed to play it on a non-Japanese console, since the disc is locked to the Japanese region.

=== Xbox Live Arcade release ===
An Xbox Live Arcade version for the Xbox 360 was released. It features high definition graphics, new background music, online leaderboards, and achievement points feature. However, story mode and arrange mode are not included. Online leader board includes 6 boards for each fighters per difficulty setting. A new ending and new cut scenes based on the arcade version was included. Xbox achievement feature includes 200 points in 12 categories. The game became playable on Xbox One, through Xbox backwards compatibility on July 28, 2016.

=== i-mode release ===
Triggerheart Exelica KUMASH! includes new bosses and stages, score ranking. The game is split into 2 parts. Early order includes character QUO card. Downloadable contents include comic, dress-up tool, desktop accessories. In Triggerheart Exelica KUMASH! the player gains points by capturing enemy fighter and throw enemies to panel of same colour. The fever gauge increases by throwing enemies to panels of the same color. When the fever gauge is full, throwing enemies to gold ingot panel causes massive amounts of score items to be dropped. The game includes 3 difficulty settings with 1 minute, 3 minutes, or no time limits.

=== PlayStation 2 release ===
Released as Triggerheart Exelica Enhanced It features some changes in comparison with the original Dreamcast release:

- TH44 Faintear is now a player selectable character.
- Omelette, Watt, Triggerheart Backupper C'r_na, Skiltall (also called "Skilltor"), originally only part of story concept, now appears in the game.
- Other new elements include event CG, story mode and an opening movie. The opening theme is "Gravity Error" by Ayane.
- Arrange mode from the Dreamcast game was not included.

A limited edition includes a Nendoroid (Exelica) figure made by Good Smile Company. Pre-order also includes accessory balloon.

== Media ==
=== Soundtrack ===
TRIGGERHEART EXELICA SOUND ANCHOR was a CD album with the music from the Dreamcast version, along with unused tracks and one remix.

TRIGGERHEART EXELICA ENHANCED: GRAVITY ERROR was a CD album that includes original and off vocal versions of Triggerheart Exelica -Enhanced- and PSP version of Memories Off#5 opening theme songs.

It was published by Media Factory, Inc.

=== Drama CD ===
Triggerheart Exelica Parallel Anchor is an audio drama adaptation by Frontier Works Inc.

== Reception ==
Reception

Aggregate scores
Aggregator	Score
GameRankings	65.93% (XBLA)
Metacritic	63/100 (XBLA)

Review scores
Publication	Score
1Up.com	B (XBLA)
Eurogamer	7/10 (XBLA)
GameSpot	6/10 (XBLA)
GamesRadar+	2.5/5 (XBLA)
IGN	5.7/10 (XBLA)
Official Xbox Magazine (US)	3/5 (XBLA)
