= Michelin Rally Masters: Race of Champions =

2000 video game

- PlayStation cover art
- Developer: Digital Illusions CE
- Publisher: Infogrames
- Platforms: Microsoft Windows, PlayStation
- Release: Windows: FRA: 12 April 2000; UK: 25 July 2000; NA: 26 September 2000; PlayStation: EU: 26 April 2000; NA: 24 October 2000
- Genre: Racing
- Modes: Single-player, multiplayer

Michelin Rally Masters: Race of Champions, also known as simply Rally Masters, is a racing video game developed by Digital Illusions CE and published by Infogrames in 2000 for Microsoft Windows and PlayStation. It is branded after the Race of Champions sporting event, and features 20 licensed rally automobiles.

== Development ==
The game was announced by Digital Illusions as Rally Masters in January 1999, with Gremlin Interactive as publisher. Following Gremlin's purchase by Infogrames, the company revealed a North American release under the name Test Drive Rally in August 1999. A version of the game for the Nintendo 64 was also planned until Infogrames cancelled the release in February 2000. A Dreamcast version was also reported in October 1999, but did not materialize. Eventually, Infogrames secured a licensing deal with Michelin and the game was renamed under its final name in all territories.

== Reception ==
Reception

Aggregate score
Aggregator	Score	
Aggregator	PC	PS
GameRankings	79%	N/A

Review scores
Publication	Score	
Publication	PC	PS
AllGame	3.5/5	N/A
CNET Gamecenter	8/10	N/A
Computer Games Strategy Plus	3.5/5	N/A
EP Daily	7.5/10	N/A
GameSpot	7.2/10	N/A
GameSpy	86%	N/A
GameZone	8.5/10	N/A
IGN	9/10	5.2/10
Jeuxvideo.com	18/20	16/20
PC Gamer (US)	78%	N/A

The PC version received favourable reviews, according to the review aggregation website GameRankings.

It won the award for "Racing Game of 2000" in Editors' Choice at IGN's Best of 2000 Awards.

== See also ==
- Rally Fusion: Race of Champions
