= Shienryu =

1997 video game

- Arcade flyer
- Developer: Warashi
- Publishers: JP: Sega (arcade); JP: Warashi; NA: Natsume Inc.
- Platforms: Arcade, Sega Saturn, PlayStation
- Release: Arcade: JP: February 1997; Saturn: JP: 1997; PlayStation: JP: May 20, 1999; NA: December 17, 2002
- Genre: Scrolling shooter
- Modes: Single-player, multiplayer
- Arcade system: Sega Titan Video (ST-V)

Shienryu (Note: Japanese: 紫炎龍, Hepburn: Shienryū) is a 1997 vertically scrolling shooter video game developed by Warashi and published by Sega for arcades. It was released in Japan in February 1997. It was later followed by a Sega Saturn console release the same year. A PlayStation version was released in 1999 and 2002 in Japan and North America respectively as Geki-Oh Shienryu and Geki-Oh Shooting King.

Hamster Corporation acquired the game's rights alongside Warashi's catalogue, releasing the PS1 version as part of their Console Archives series for the Nintendo Switch 2 and PlayStation 5 in May 2026.

== Story ==
Taking place in the distant future, Earth's people starts their search for new planets to colonize, specifically those similar to it. The colony ships, known as the Caravans, travel deep into space until Caravan 7861 discovers a suitable fourth planet from an alien sun, but none of the other Caravans had followed. After 93 years of civilization on the new Mother Planet, the investigation of the missing Caravans finally leads to a horrible discovery: the previous Caravans had been attacked and conquered by a powerful regime of alien-humans. Commanded by the mysterious Shienryu, the alien space fleet invades the Mother Planet and constructs fortresses across the world, destroying and replacing any established human influence. In response, a defense team called "Burn Dragoon" is founded which calls for the best pilots and navigators to defend the new planet from the invading regime.

== Gameplay ==
Players control either of two double-piloted ships going against the bases of the regime based both on the new mother planet and in space.

Survival is a great emphasis in gameplay as enemies will fire blankets of pulse shots across the screen, some larger than others and some taking on wide intricate patterns.

Extends are awarded to players who reach an indicated score (the score is changeable in the Saturn version) as well as 1UPs, though both 1UPs and even 2UPs are available after defeating minibosses in a certain amount of time.

=== Weapon system ===
When player starts a game, the initial fighter fires vulcan with slowest movement.

The selected weapon type determines the type of bomb being used.

Weapon	Shot	Bomb
Vulcan	Fires bullets in forward wave formation.	Fires a large laser beam that sweeps from the ship's sides and gradually ends facing forward.
Laser	Fires homing lightning. When lightning is visible, the fighter cannot fire further shots.	Fires 5 laser beams of the screen height around the fighter when bomb is used.
Missiles	Fires missile in forward formation. In higher power levels, additional homing missiles are also fired.	Fires a short range bomb that circulates the fighter.

=== Items ===
Items become available by destroying certain enemies:

- Power up (P): Increases fighter's firepower. If the item is collected when weapon power is full, player gets 5000 points. After fighter's firepower is at maximum, up to additional 3 items can be stored, which are added to the next fighter's firepower after current fighter is destroyed.
- Speed up (S): Increases fighter's speed (up to 3 times). If the item is collected when fighter is at maximum speed, player gets 5000 points.
- Bomb (B): Increases player's bomb stock (up to 20). If the item is collected when bomb stock is full, player gets 5000 points.
- Full power & shield (flashing P): Cause fighter to become invulnerable until being hit once, and increases fighter's firepower and speed to maximum. Under the right circumstances, can explode in an array of pick-ups.
- Change Vulcan (red): Changes weapon to vulcan.
- Change Laser (blue): Changes weapon to laser.
- Change Missile (yellow): Changes weapon to missile.
- Red LED: Increase player's score by 500 points.
- Blue LED: Increase player's score by 5000 points.
- 1UP: Increases player's life stock by 1.
- 2UP: Increases player's life stock by 2. This is by far the rarest item in the game.

=== Stages ===
There are 8 stages in each loop, for a total of 2 loops. In 2nd loop, enemy bullets are fired at faster speeds.

When a player loses a life, the game continues at the last reached pre-defined checkpoint with firepower collected by the last fighter at slowest speed. The checkpoint feature is inactive when a second player is present.

At the end of each stage, player gets 5000 points for each available bomb, 500 points for each red LED collected in the completed stage (blue LED counted as 10 red LEDs).

==== Bosses ====
- Stage 1: Hell Moa (Walker Mechaniloid)
- Stage 2: Giant Owl (Flying airship)
- Stage 3: Polypus (Octopus Mechaniloid)
- Stage 4: Dio (Orange Mecha-Dragon)
- Stage 5: Joe (Armed spring-fists Mechaniloid)
- Stage 6: Matoolor (Cream colored Mechaniloid)
- Stage 7: Bisonte (Mechaniloid that can eject from its armor unit)
- Stage 8: Shienryu (Purple Mecha-Dragon)

== Gekioh Shooting King ==
Gekioh Shooting King is a PlayStation port of the original Shienryu. It adds following:

- Pocket Mode: Presented in PocketStation graphics and effects (under the name JIENRYU), enemies appear as blocky heart-shaped craft and bullets are tiny gray blocks, all lacking graphical detail.
- Comical Mode: The same game, only there is no music and the sound effects are replaced by various laugh tracks and an audience applauds the player the higher their score gets.
- Stingy Mode: The player has only one life, no continues and there are only two levels. Oddly enough, the original soundtrack is used in this mode only.
- No Mercy Mode: The same game, only extremely difficult.
- Slow Mode: The game has darker shading, an atmospheric/techno beat soundtrack and all sound effects are replaced by haunted-house type sounds. All enemies and the player's ship scream once destroyed. Despite the greatly slowed movements of all of the sprites onscreen, the game vastly increases the number of bullets put out by the enemy and this mode is the most difficult setting in the game.
- Ancient Mode: The game is presented in a yellowed-with-age monochrome screen with cracks and lines in the screen as well as weakened sound effects and music to create an antiquated feel.
- Arcade mode now called Gekioh Mode.

=== Changes to arcade mode ===
- Gekioh Shooting King has a lower grade version of the original soundtrack resulting in weaker tunes and musical effects.
- The game lacks the transparency and depth effects the Saturn original had, particularly on the massive second level boss fight.
- This version disables save-game abilities particularly high scores and option changes, seeing how there is no option menu in GSK.
- The manual in Gekioh Shooting King disavows the original plot and pilot identification.
- Gekioh Shooting King does not have a second loop like in the arcade and Saturn version. The game will end once the final boss is destroyed.

== Reception ==
SHMUPS! rated the Shienryu Explosion 7.

Gamerankings rated Steel Dragon EX 36.50% based on 2 reviews.
