= Warashi =

Japanese video game company

Warashi 株式会社 童
- Type: Private
- Industry: Video games
- Founded: August 1, 1995
- Defunct: 2011
- Successor: Hamster Corporation
- Headquarters: Shibuya, Tokyo, Japan
- Number of employees: about 40 (from January 2003)

Warashi Inc. (株式会社 童) was a Japanese video game developer that developed video games for arcade, home console, and mobile platforms, specializing in mahjong and shoot 'em up titles. It is known for the Shienryu series of games and for releasing one of the final Dreamcast games, Triggerheart Exelica, in early 2007.

Warashi became defunct in 2011. Tsutomu Tabata, a former programmer for Warashi and Athena, was hired by game development company Cosmo Machia as its CTO in 2015. The rights to Triggerheart Exelica were acquired by Cosmo Machia in 2023. Hamster Corporation purchased the company's remaining assets in May 2026 and has plans to release them as part of their Arcade Archives and Console Archives series.

== Developed titles ==
=== Shooters ===
- Shienryu (1997) — ST-V/Saturn/PlayStation 2
- Simple Character 2000 Series Vol. 8, Kagaru Ninja Tai Gatchaman: The Shooting (2002) — PlayStation
- Sengeki Striker (1997) — Kaneko Super Nova System
- Macross M3 (2001) — Dreamcast
- Shienryu Explosion (2003) — PlayStation 2
- Triggerheart Exelica (2006) — NAOMI/Dreamcast/Xbox 360
- Triggerheart Exelica Enhanced (2009) — PlayStation 2

=== Mahjong ===
- Akagi ~Yami ni Oritatta Tensai~ (2002) — PlayStation 2
- Gal Jan (1996) — Saturn
- Simple 1500 Series, The Mahjong 2 () — PlayStation
- Simple 1500 Series, The Shisenshou 2 () — PlayStation
- Simple 2000 Honkaku Shikou Series Vol. 4, The Mahjong () — PlayStation 2
- Simple DS Series, The Mahjong (2005) — Nintendo DS
- Stylish Mahjong: Usagi ~Yasei no Toupai~ & Usagi ~Yasei no Toupai the Arcade~ Double Pack () — PlayStation 2
- Mahjong King (1999) — Game Boy Color
- Mahjong Queen (2000) — Game Boy Color

=== Other ===
- Shogi King (1998) — Game Boy Color
- Break 'Em All (2005) — Nintendo DS
- Simple 1500 Series The Shougi 2 () — PlayStation
- Simple 2000 Series Vol. 12, The Quiz 20,000 Questions (2002) — PlayStation 2
- Simple 2000 Series Vol. 85, The Sekai Meisaku Gekijou Quiz () — PlayStation 2
- Simple DS Series Vol. 3, Beetle King (2005) — Nintendo DS
