= Metal Saga: The Ark of Wastes =

2015 video game

Metal Saga: Ark of the Wasteland
- Developer: Success
- Publisher: Success
- Composer: Yoshimi Kudo
- Series: Metal Saga
- Platforms: Android, iOS
- Release: JP: December 7, 2015
- Genre: Role-playing

Metal Saga: Ark of the Wasteland (メタルサーガ ～荒野の方舟～, Metaru Sāga ~ Kōya no Hakobune ~) is a role-playing video game in the Metal Max series, which was developed and published by Japanese company Success for Android and iOS.

== Gameplay ==
Metal Saga: Ark of the Wasteland is a role-playing video game. Similar as its predecessors, players needs to battle with enemies by themselves or by vehicles. There are several "Wanted" enemies, which are powerful but worth of a lot of money.

In dungeons, player controls characters and/or vehicles by moving the Drum-styled virtual pad.

== Development ==
Metal Saga: Ark of the Wasteland was first announced in November 2014.
