= Satoshi Kadokura =

Musical artist (born 1959)

- 門倉 聡
- Born: May 25, 1959 (age 67); Kamakura, Kanagawa, Japan
- Education: Tokyo University of the Arts
- Occupations: Composer; arranger; producer; keyboardist
- Known for: producer for Wink, Noriyuki Makihara, Southern All Stars
- Notable work: scores for video game series Metal Max

Satoshi Kadokura (門倉 聡, Kadokura Satoshi; born May 25, 1959), is a Japanese composer, arranger, producer and keyboardist. He graduated from Tokyo University of the Arts. He was a producer of Wink, Noriyuki Makihara, Southern All Stars and many other artists. He also composes scores for video game series Metal Max.

== Works ==
=== Video games ===
- Famicom Jump II: Saikyō no Shichinin (1991)
- Metal Max (1991)
- Metal Max 2 (1993)
- Metal Max Returns (1995)
- Itadaki Street 3 (2002)
- Metal Saga (2005)
- MeiQ: Labyrinth of Death (2015)
- Metal Max Xeno (2018)
