= Metal Saga: Season of Steel =

2006 video game

Metal Saga: Hagane no Kisetsu
- Developer(s): Crea-Tech
- Publisher(s): Success
- Producer(s): Hiroshi Miyaoka
- Series: Metal Max
- Platform(s): Nintendo DS
- Release: JP: June 15, 2006
- Genre(s): Role-playing video game
- Mode(s): Single-player

Metal Saga: Season of Steel (Note: Metal Saga: Hagane no Kisetsu (メタルサーガ ～鋼の季節～)) is a post-apocalyptic role-playing video game developed by Crea-Tech and published by Success in 2006. It was released for the Nintendo DS and is a full touchscreen-controlled game.

Season of Steel is the sixth game of the Metal Max series. Unlike its predecessor Metal Saga, the game wasn't released in North America. In 2007, a sequel was released on mobile phone as an incarnation of Metal Saga and was released in Japan.

This entry is different from the other entries in the series. For example, multiple characters sit only in a tank instead of one person sit in one, and using "durability" instead of tank's armor.

== Gameplay ==
Like most role-playing video games, players travel around the world, buy powerful equipment, battle with monsters and save the world. Unlike all predecessors, the world map uses a 45-degree angle view, and using a point instead town or dungeon' pigeon hole, with the only way from a point to a point; once the player completes the task, the next location will appear on the map.

Combat is individually turn-based, players can choose to combat enemies by foot or with a tank. All party members can equip multiple weapons, and can choose the one to attack enemy in one turn. On the other hand, if the party members choose to fight whilst being in the tank, every character will need to use different weapon to attack enemy in each turn. Each weapon and monster has their own property, like fire, light etc. Allelopathy property will affect the attack effect.

== Plot ==
In the near future, the world was devastated by a supercomputer named Noah, but remnants of humanity survived this cataclysm, naming the event Great Destruction. Noah continued its intent to wipe Earth clean of humanity in this post-apocalyptic world. A hunter named Rebanna destroyed Noah before its ambition was fulfilled. Noah foresaw the possibility of its demise, and so devised "Noah consciousness awakening program" in this unlikely event and stores it within indestructible super-alloy shell called "Noah Seed". Under this threat, Rebanna's children undertake the task to fight the resurrected supercomputer.

== Reception ==
Japanese game magazine Famitsu scored the Metal Saga: Hagane no Kisetsu 27/40. In its released year, Metal Saga: Hagane no Kisetsu was sold 26,000 copies.
