= Metal Max =

- Genre: Role-playing game
- Developers: Crea-Tech; Data East; Kuusoukagaku; Success; Cattle Call; 24Frame
- Publishers: Data East; Success; Enterbrain; Kadokawa Games; Cygames
- Creator: Hiroshi Miyaoka
- Artist: Atsuji Yamamoto
- Composer: Satoshi Kadokura
- Platforms: Nintendo Entertainment System, Super Nintendo Entertainment System, Game Boy Advance, PlayStation 2, Nintendo DS, Mobile Phone, Nintendo 3DS, Android, iOS, PlayStation Vita, PlayStation 4
- First release: Metal Max; May 24, 1991
- Latest release: Metal Dogs; April 8, 2022

Metal Max (メタルマックス, Metaru Makkusu) is a role-playing video game series created by Hiroshi Miyaoka and his studio Crea-Tech. The first title was developed by Crea-Tech in collaboration with Data East, and was published by Data East in 1991. Due to the bankruptcy of Data East and trademark problems, some titles were released by Success co. under the title Metal Saga (メタルサーガ, Metaru Sāga). Since the trademark issue was resolved by Enterbrain, some games in the series have been released under the title Metal Max again.

Set in a post-apocalyptic open world, the games in the Metal Max series are turn-based, nonlinear, vehicle combat, role-playing video games. There have been six Metal Max games and five Metal Saga games, in addition to remakes of several Metal Max titles. Notable installments in the series released for NES, Super NES, PlayStation 2, Nintendo DS and Nintendo 3DS; the series has had mobile and browser releases as well. Most titles only saw release in Japan, the first Metal Saga being the only console title that was localized for English markets. Some related manga and soundtracks were also released. The most recent mainline entry to the series is the 2018 PlayStation Vita and PlayStation 4 game, Metal Max Xeno, which received a remake in 2020 titled Metal Max Xeno: Reborn for Microsoft Windows, Nintendo Switch, and PlayStation 4.

The plot of the series is based on multiple different apocalypse scenarios, the games occurring after the apocalypse has already begun. Most of the Metal Max titles feature open world gameplay, one of the key features of which being that players are given the ability to end the game at any time and complete quests in whatever order.

== Titles ==
=== Games ===
Release timeline
1991	Metal Max
1992
1993	Metal Max 2
1994
1995	Metal Max Returns
1996
1997
1998
1999
2000
2001
2002
2003	Metal Max 2 Kai
2004
2005	Metal Saga: Chain of Sandstorm
2006	Metal Saga: Season of Steel
2007	Metal Saga Mobile
2008
2009
2010	Metal Max 3
2010	Metal Saga: New Frontier
2011	Metal Max 2: Reloaded
2012
2013	Metal Max 4: Gekkō no Diva
2014
2015	Metal Max: Fireworks
2015	Metal Saga: The Ark of Wastes
2016
2017
2018	Metal Max Xeno
2019
2020	Metal Max Xeno: Reborn
2021
2022	Metal Dogs

The first Metal Max title was released in 1991 for the Japanese Famicom, with a Super Famicom remake titled Metal Max Returns coming in 1995. The second title, Metal Max 2, was released in 1993 for the Super Famicom. Metal Max 2 and Metal Max Returns were planned to be ported to the Game Boy Advance and were scheduled to be released in 2003, under the titles Metal Max 2 Kai and Metal Max Returns Kai, respectively, although Metal Max Returns Kai was later cancelled. Metal Max 2 had an enhanced remake in 2011 for the Nintendo DS titled Metal Max 2: Reloaded, using the engine from Metal Max 3. All Famicom and Super Famicom titles were re-released for the Japanese Wii Virtual Console, and the original Famicom Metal Max was released for Nintendo 3DS Virtual Console.

After Metal Max Returns, there were several cancelled games. Rumours arose about a PlayStation game Metal Max 3: Heart of Gold. In 1999, an official announcement was made for a Dreamcast entry titled Metal Max: Wild Eyes, but was cancelled.

Due to the trademark trouble, four new games were released under the title Metal Saga. The first title Metal Saga: Chain of Sandstorm was released for PlayStation 2 in 2005 in Japan, and re-released in the next year with a cheaper price. The game was also released in North America in 2006 with a simple title Metal Saga; this is the only entry released in English market. Metal Saga: Season of Steel, a Nintendo DS title released in 2006 is a direct sequel of original Metal Max. Metal Saga Mobile, also known as Metal Saga: the Melody of Linkage, was released in 2007. Metal Saga: New Frontier is a 2010 massively multiplayer online role-playing browser game.

Since the trademark problem had been solved, the Nintendo DS title Metal Max 3 was released in 2010, Metal Max 2 Reloaded in 2011, the Nintendo 3DS sequel Metal Max 4: Gekkō no Diva was released in 2013, and Metal Max Xeno in 2018.

=== Related media ===
Several titles had spin-off manga. Metal Max 2 Super Collection is a 1993 comics anthology based on Metal Max 2 background; it collected Atsuji Yamamo and other three artists' comics. Metal Saga: Chain of Sandstorm Comic Anthology is a funny comic anthology based on the first Metal Saga.Metal Max 3: Sōjūshin no Majo (メタルマックス3 双銃身の魔女; lit. "Metal Max 3: Double-barrelled Witch"), storied by Hiroshi Miyaoka and comiced by Atsuji Yamamoto, shared the same background of Metal Max 3. Manga was original serialized on Famitsu's website on the day after the game released. The series was released as a two-volume standalone book. Packed with limited edition of Metal Max 3, Metal Max 2: Reloaded and Metal Max 4: Moonlight Diva, respective comics were tied up. Atsuji Yamamoto's comic anthology M4 Featuring Metal Max Momo was published in 2000. It collected an original story Metal Max Momo which based on the series, along with another three comics.

The Metal Max soundtrack was composed by Satoshi Kadokura. It was collected in Tokuma Shoten's Super Famicom New Game Sound Museum Vol.7, and contains three soundtracks from Metal Max 2. The first Metal Saga and later Metal Max titles' soundtracks were released independently or packed with the game. Packed with limited edition Metal Max 3 and Metal Max 2: Reloaded, the Famicom and Super Famicom titles' soundtracks were completed. In March 2011, a live concert of Metal Max 3 with another game Dariusburst was held in Shibuya, Tokyo. Some soundtracks were official remixed.

There are other print media released. Metal Max: Bōsō Tank Bōken Senki (メタルマックス 暴走タンク冒険戦記; lit. "Metal Max: Ballistic Tank Adventure Commentaries") is gamebook of original Metal Max, but did some changes like featured an original final boss. It was written by Shin Murakami, published in 1991 as a part of Mandarake's adventure gamebook series. Metal Max: Kaen Suishō (メタルマックス 火炎水晶; lit. "Metal Max: The Flame Crystal"), written by Aoi Kitazawa and published by Kadokawa Bunko in 1993, is a Metal Max based novel. With all console titles, official guidebooks were released, while some of them contains staff interviews. Other related goods contains T-shirt, cup, themed poster and so on, usually packed with limited edition games.

== Common elements ==
=== Gameplay ===
The series is an early example of open-ended, non-linear gameplay. They lack a predetermined story path, but the player is instead given the choice of what missions to follow in whichever order while being able to visit almost any place in the game world at any time from the beginning. The ending can be determined by the player, who can alter the ending through their actions, can complete the game at almost any time, and continue playing the game even after the ending. Some of the games give the player the freedom to complete the game almost immediately after starting it, particularly Metal Saga, which could be completed with a full ending scenario just minutes into the game, making it the shortest possible RPG.

The character classes, such as a mechanic or soldier, could be chosen for the player characters, who would fight in turn-based battles either on foot or using tanks and other vehicles such as motors. The player could create tanks, customize and make a variety of modifications to them, remodel and enhance each part, strengthen the defence, repair damaged parts, and give them more shells.

=== Vehicle system ===
One feature of Metal Max series is vehicle system. In games, player can seek and collect various kinds of vehicles, then change their equips and transform them.

Each human characters can drive vehicles. In early games, each playable character only can use one tank; in recent games, one tanks can accommodate multiple characters.

Vehicles contain six kinds of assembly unit: three for maintain operation and three for attacking enemies. Chassis is the outer casing that holds everything together. Each vehicles have their own unique chassis and can't be changed. Engine determines the maximum loadout for the vehicle. C Unit enables vehicles to be handled by a single crew member; without it, the vehicle cannot function. Main gun has grand power, but limited by ammunition along with smaller attack range. Sub gun has large fire range without ammunition, but low attack. Special equipment comes with large and high fire power, but heavy and/or expensive is high.

Vehicles are protected by mass-possessed armors. When vehicle is attacked, armors will be lost until zero. Without armor, the vehicle parts can become broken, and vehicle stops functioning when damaged seriously. Damaged vehicles can be repaired in towns or by mechanics.

=== Characters ===
The Metal Max series features several recurring characters, like Dr. Minchi, and several wanted like Kamikaze King. These characters were designed by Atsuji Yamamoto.

Dr. Minchi is an electric shock expert, who is into resurrection. When the player dies in a battle, the corpse(s) will be sent to － usually by his cyborg assistant Igor － him in every game. Dr. Minchi appears with a cheerful theme "Let's meet Dr. Minchi" (Dr.ミンチに会いましょう).

Since Metal Max 2, dogs can take part in player's team; dogs can join the battle, but have self-determined actions. Dogs can equip certain weapons and armours, use special items, but cannot drive vehicles. Dogs are usually named Pochi.

Some enemies also appear in multiple games. Kamikaze King is a bomb-like enemy with a single eye who has high defense, and very likely to escape. It attacks the player by self-destruction. It also appear in other forms, like Kamikaze Queen in Metal Max 3.

== Development and release ==
All Metal Max games and some Metal Saga titles were created by Hiroshi Miyaoka. Miyaoka is a friend of Yuji Horii － who created the Dragon Quest series － and joined the first three Dragon Quest games' development as a scenario assister and dungeon designer. He launched company Crea-Tech in 1988. Atsuji Yamamoto, Hiroshi Miyaoka's secondary schoolmate, designed for characters; and Satoshi Kadokura contributed musics. Tomoki Tauchi, known as "key man" of the series, directed several Metal Max games, also as a programmer of original Metal Max.

=== Data East era ===
The first two games with a remake of the original game were released by video game company Data East.

The first Metal Max was originally planned to be released before next-generation console Super Famicom's arrival, but it was prolonged. It was released in end of Famicom era, 24 May 1991, while Super Famicom has been released in November 1990 yet. In television commercial message, the slogan "We've had enough of dragon-slaying" (竜退治はもう飽きた) was used. Compared with Dragon Quest and such games focused on story, Metal Max featured an open world similar as Square's Romancing SaGa.

The first sequel Metal Max 2 was released in 1993 on Super Famicom, which improved in accessible aspect.

Metal Max was remade on Super Famicom by Kuusoukagaku under the title Metal Max Returns.

=== Long break ===
From 1996 to 2005, no new Metal Max games were added to the series. After Metal Max 2 was released, Data East was asked about the third title but no answer was given by the company. Later the company went through troubles brought by management issues. Some companies also provided offers for developing a Game Boy title. During this period, the Japanese magazine Super Logo Design rumoured that Crea-Tech would publish Metal Max 3: Heart of Gold for the PlayStation. In a 2010 developer meeting, it was said that a PlayStation Metal Max 3 was conceived, but was given up due to development budget shortage.

In 1999, Care-Tech announced that the sequel would be published for the Dreamcast, and tentatively named it Metal Max Overdrive, and planned to be published by ASCII Entertainment, then later renamed it Metal Max: Wild Eyes and announced to be released in winter 2000. Wild Eyes was significantly influenced by MMORPG EverQuest in many aspects, which included a full 3D seamless map. This proposal was called as "the greatest love story in Metal Max history", but due to ASCII management goind badly and withdrawing from video game market, and other reasons, the game was cancelled.

In the late 1990s, Data East ran into financial trouble and sold the games' remake rights to help them survive. Now Production received the rights to remake SNES title Metal Max 2 and Metal Max Returns for Game Boy Advance. Metal Max 2's remake version was published on June 20, 2003, and named Metal Max 2 Kai; "Kai" is literally translated as "modified", referred to add some wanted and rent tanks. Due to bugs in the game 2 Kai, Now Production recalled all of the cartridges, and the publishing of version 1.1. Just 5 days after 2 Kai was released, Data East declared bankruptcy, then the trademark was registered by Shinjuku Express, and insolvency representative of Data East court failed. Shinjuku Express was terminated from Data East's bankruptcy trustee and Metal Max Returns Kai was cancelled.

=== Success company era ===
In 2005, Metal Saga was developed and published by Success for the PlayStation 2. The development team is a new team, while some staffs are fan of Metal Max. Hiroshi Miyaoka didn't join the project at the beginning, and new character designer instead of Atsuji Yamamoto. The game producer originally planned to port predecessors, but was declined because Success didn't hold licenses about old titles. Due to underestimation, the development period extended to two years and a half. The game was originally planned to feature 3D background with 2D characters, but for plenty of characters and overseas market release, the 3D effect was determined; this is the first 3D title of the series. A cheaper edition of Metal Saga was released in March 2006 in Japan with minor changes. The game was released for North America in 2006 by Atlus, being the first time series released in English market.

Also in 2006, a sequel titled Metal Saga: Season of Steel was released in Japan for the Nintendo DS, which followed the story of Metal Max protagonist's son. Hiroshi Miyaoka designed the game again. The game featured 2D screen, and control with touch screen as a new attempt. Metal Saga Mobile, a.k.a. Metal Saga: the Melody of Linkage, was released for Japanese cellphone with 2 MB capacity in July 2007 and then released for another cellphone brand. The fourth Metal Saga, Metal Saga: New Frontier, is a web MMORPG. The game is similar as online management simulation game. In the game, players control a "hunter company", manage hunters and vehicles, defeat wanted, and ally with other companies. The game was officially serviced in 2010 in Japan, and is operated in some other East Asia countries.

=== Kadokawa era ===
In 2008, Enterbrain approached producer with a new title, but trademark problem was found after six months. In April 2009, Enterbrain registered the trademark "Metal Max", and Metal Max 3 was released in July 2010 by Kadokawa Games for the Nintendo DS, 17 years since predecessor numbered title Metal Max 2 was released. Considered that there were many light new users, and grinding might be boring, the protagonist has a high statistics with game starting. Based on Metal Max 3 engine, Nintendo DS remake of Metal Max 2 was released in 2011 and named Metal Max 2: Reloaded.

Metal Max 4: Gekkō no Diva was released in November 2013 for the Nintendo 3DS. Like Metal Max 3, it is published by Kadokawa Shoten.

Metal Max, Metal Max 2 and Metal Max Returns were released for the Wii Virtual Console from 2010 to 2011.

=== Cygames era ===
In July 2022, Cygames acquired the rights to the Metal Max intellectual property.

== Reception and sales ==
Famitsu score and Japanese sales
Title	Famitsu score	Japanese sales
Metal Max	29 out of 40	120,000－150,000
Metal Max 2	30 out of 40	250,000－280,000
Metal Max Returns	29 out of 40	170,000
Metal Max 2 Kai	27 out of 40	20,000
Metal Saga	30 out of 40	99,374
Metal Saga: Season of Steel	27 out of 40	21,090－26,000
Metal Max 3	33 out of 40	91,722
Metal Max 2: ReLoaded	33 out of 40	57,000
Metal Max 4: Gekkō no Diva	35 out of 40	39,982
Metal Max Xeno	31 out of 40	29,700

Japanese video game critics usually praised the series' high degree of freedom and vehicle system.

The first title received a 29 out of 40 from Japanese video game magazine Famitsu, and has sold more than 120,000 copies in Japan. The second title, Metal Max 2 got a 31 out of 40 from Famitsu, and with more than 250,000 copies, it is the best-seller of the series. Super Famicom remake of original Metal Max, Metal Max Returns received a 30 out of 40 from Famitsu and has sold 170,000 copies. Metal Max 2's Game Boy Advance remake sold 9,500 copies, and received negative reception due to its bug.

Japanese magazine Famitsu and Dengeki PlayStation gave Metal Saga a 30/40 and 330/400, respectively. The title sold 63,000 copies in its debut week, and became the top best-seller in Japan. The second Metal Saga title Metal Saga: Season of Steel received a 27 out of 40 from Famitsu, and sold more than twenty thousand copies.

Metal Max 3 received a 33 out of 40 from Famitsu. Japanese players enjoyed game's free adventure, character customization system similar as Wizardry and Dragon Quest III, and vehicle transformation, but complained about lot of goals and high encounter rate. Metal Max 2: Reloaded also received a 33 out of 40. Metal Max 4: Gekkō no Diva received a 35 out of 40 from Famitsu.

Except the first Metal Saga and Metal Max Xeno, none of the titles were released outside Japan. Metal Saga got a mixed reception in western media, which ranked 64% and 62% on the review score aggregator sites GameRankings and Metacritic, respectively. While the game's sense of humour, music and solid hours of gameplay won it some positive marks, reviewers scoffed at the dated graphics, lack of plot, and missing feeling of progression. GameSpot noted that "Metal Saga has the makings of a good role-playing game, but there's nothing to tie it all together".
