= Metal Saga =

2005 video game

- North American cover art
- Developers: Success; Crea-Tech
- Publishers: JP: Success; NA: Atlus
- Directors: Masato Kimura; Satoru Komiya; Mizuho Sasa
- Producers: Katsunori Nagashima; Masaru Saitō
- Writer: Naoki Mutō
- Composer: Satoshi Kadokura
- Series: Metal Max
- Platform: PlayStation 2
- Release: JP: June 9, 2005; NA: April 25, 2006
- Genre: Role-playing video game
- Mode: Single-player

Metal Saga, known in Japan as Metal Saga: Sajin no Kusari (メタルサーガ ～砂塵の鎖～, Metaru Sāga Sajin no Kusari; Metal Saga: Chain of Sandstorm), is a post-apocalyptic role-playing video game developed by Success and published by Atlus and Success.

Metal Saga is the fifth game in the Metal Max series and the first one to reach the United States. Like the previous games in the series, it follows an open, non-linear style of gameplay. The game received a mixed reception for its unconventional gameplay and dated graphics.

== Gameplay ==
The game mechanics are similar to that of most role-playing video games. Players travel between points of interest on an overworld map, during which point in time they can be attacked by randomly encountered foes. Within towns, players can rest, repair vehicles, sell items, and other typical activities. The "dungeons" in the title are usually caves or abandoned buildings. Such hostile locations are relatively small, with much of their complexity being due to their maze-like nature (and the lack of an auto-mapping feature).

Combat is individually turn-based, utilizing a staggered initiative system (e.g., characters on foot are faster than those in tanks). Any canine member of the party acts on his or her own, automatically attacking foes at random. For the remaining characters, players choose among a limited number of actions. While characters do have some skills which can be used during combat, these cost money to use (rather than using a separate mana/skill point pool) and often cannot be used when within a tank. As a result, skills are not necessarily as attractive as in other such games. Although certain weapons are clearly intended to be used against certain foes, characters cannot change arms or armor during combat.

=== Tanks ===
All of the characters, with the exception of the dogs, can be placed within tanks to further improve their combat performance. While fighting from within a tank, characters use the on-board weapons instead of their hand weapons, and suffer damage to the tank, rather than to their person. This provides an additional layer of defense, in that characters can exit the tank and continue to fight if the tank becomes inoperable. When not in combat, one additional tank can be towed and used to store spare parts or used as a spare vehicle.

There are a total of 15 tanks in the game. While the game uses the term "tank" to refer to all such vehicles, several of them are not actually tanks. These include a fire truck (complete with ladder) and a bus. Nonetheless, most of the tanks are more traditional, such as a German Panzer, or two anti-aircraft tanks. While the different tank models are generally similar in practice, they each have slightly different innate characteristics.

The tanks can not only be equipped, but also customized on a very sophisticated level. Players select and purchase primary guns (referred as MAIN—limited in ammunition), secondary guns (referred as SUB or Sub Gun—unlimited ammunition) and special-purpose weaponry (referred as SE or Special Equipment—very limited in ammunition). Each item includes a weight value, with the tank's engine only able to drive a certain total amount of weight. As such, a balance must be struck, since every unit of weight not used for weaponry can be used to add additional armor tiles. Furthermore, money can be spent to modify each part of the tank, e.g., to increase the amount of ammunition which a given weapon carries (again at the cost of a further weight increase).

Vehicle parts are categorized into several different categories:

- Chassis: The vehicle chassis, this is the outer casing that holds everything together. Different chassis offer different levels of protection and speed (FAVs will offer less protection but the highest speed, whereas main battle tanks will offer the highest degree of defense at a lower mobility).
- Engine: The engine determines the maximum loadout for the vehicle. The lower the rating, the less tonnage that the engine can handle. Engines do not affect the mobility of the vehicle.
- C Unit: The computer unit enables vehicles to be handled by a single crew member. Without it, the vehicle cannot function, as it combines various aspects of vehicle controls, such as weapons systems, so that a single crew can operate the vehicle. It is mentioned by one of the NPCs in the game that a vehicle can be operated without a C Unit although that would require three people to operate the vehicle. C Units also provide additional defenses for the vehicle, which is combined with the defensive rating of the chassis to form the total amount of defense rating of the vehicle.
- Accessories: Accessories are optional components for vehicles that are not required for the vehicles to operate. They range from Teleporters, which allow the players to travel between towns and get them out of hostile area (such as tunnels and dungeons crawling with enemies) to decorative decals to special add-ons which, when combined with special ability of the player, can damage the enemy (for example, dozer blades).
- Weapons: Although vehicles can function without any weapons mounted, the vehicles will not be able to attack the enemy effectively, if at all. Many of the weapons have distinct capabilities. For example, anti-tank main guns offer the most balanced attributes in terms of firepower, range and accuracy, while anti-aircraft main guns allow for very accurate and reliable engagement of low-altitude airborne opponents. Others include MLRS mounts that can reach out and hit enemies that are out of range for other weapons, CIWS for devastating counter against enemies that are flying at high-altitude, huge rockets that can damage enemies even through the toughest defenses, beam weapons for hitting cloaked enemies, and other various weapons that allow for the vehicles to become tremendous force-multipliers to the player.
- Armor tiles: Armor tiles are the first line of protective layer for the vehicle. Armor tiles will absorb a limited amount of damage before being worn out and prevent other internal components mentioned above from being damaged by enemy attacks. Although effective against most attacks, it will not protect the components against specialized attacks that are designed to either bypass or penetrate the armor, such as enemy armor-piercing warheads or intense freezing temperature. Armor tiles can be replenished on the field by using armor tile kits, or in repair shops.

Some vehicles can mount special designated weapons while others cannot; for example, Flakpanzers Wirbelwind and Gepard can mount anti-aircraft main guns, but cannot mount anti-tank main guns, while main battle tanks and other AFVs can mount anti-tank main guns while being unable to mount anti-air main guns.

Tanks can also be equipped with teleportation devices, which allow the entire party to instantly exit an indoor area or travel to a previously visited town.

The list of the vehicles that can be "owned" by the player is as follows:

1. Buggy (Dune buggy)
2. Demag (Sd.Kfz. 250)
3. Mosquito (Wiesel 1)
4. Gepard (Flugabwehrkanonenpanzer Gepard)
5. Wild Bus (armored passenger bus)
6. Panzer (Sturmgeschütz IV)
7. Barbarossa (Panzerkampfwagen IV Ausf. H)
8. Tiger (Panzerkampfwagen V Ausf. E Tiger I)
9. Wirbelwind (Flugabwehrkanonenpanzer IV Wirbelwind)
10. Rodina (T-34/76)
11. Abrams (M1 Abrams)
12. Leopold (Leopard 2A5/6)
13. Type Zero (Type 90)
14. Lulubel (M3 Lee)
15. Rommel (Jagdpanther)
16. Fire Truck (Fire Truck)
17. S Tank (Stridsvagn 103)
18. Merkava (Merkava Mk. IV)
19. Maus (Panzerkampfwagen VIII Maus)

Furthermore, there are other vehicles of same designs but fixed specifications that can be "rented" from various rental shops inside the towns.

A miscellaneous vehicle includes the Cargo Ship which lets players roam across the huge lake in middle of the map.

== Plot ==
=== Setting ===
The title takes place in a post-apocalyptic world, though presenting a less serious take on the genre, compared to the harsher representations seen in role-playing games such as Final Fantasy VI or Fallout, or films such as Mad Max or Nausicaa. The environment of Metal Saga seems to be relatively unscathed, with a generally healthy ecosystem and no apparent areas of radioactive contamination, perhaps since the apocalypse (referred to as the Great Destruction) happened in the first place in an attempt to destroy humanity to actually save the planet. Rather than focusing extensively on mutants and ruffians, many of the enemies encountered are merely machines gone haywire. As a result, scavenging such machines and using scavenged parts to build equipment appear to be common activities.

Additionally, the game includes a good dose of militaristic qualities, with most of the game's battles being fought from within tanks, or other tank-like armored vehicles. In essence, the game has very little storyline and mostly non-linear gameplay. Like its predecessors, one may choose to take on whichever informal quests one wants, or none at all, but cannot choose to slaughter the entire population of a town on a whim. The title features more than half a dozen possible endings, several of which can be obtained less than an hour into the game. One ending can even be obtained minutes into the game, making it the shortest possible RPG.

=== Characters ===
Players can organize a team of up to four characters: the main hero (the "Hunter"), a Mechanic, a Soldier and a mechanized dog. Players are free to choose their own party from the available characters and to switch between them during the game. There are two mechanics in the game, three fighters (one of these is hidden, and can only join during the later parts of the game) and four dogs. Most of the characters in the game have some unique dialogue and further story development during certain side quests.

During the game, players frequently have the option to purchase home furnishings and gifts which can be sent to both playable and non-playable (female) characters. These generally have no effect on gameplay.

The playable characters are:

- Syu (his name is not mentioned in the English version): The Hunter of the group, and also the main character.
- Misha (called Mika in the Japanese version): One of the Mechanics in the game, she can repair vehicles. She is Kiriya's little sister, although not blood-related.
- Kiriya: The second Mechanic in the game, he can repair vehicles. He is Misha/Mika's big brother, although not blood-related. Kiriya's real father is the Disassembler, one of the bounties the players fight during the game. If the player defeats him with Kiriya in party, a chain of events will occur, with Kiriya finding a picture of him as a young boy with the Disassembler, Kiriya leaving the party and going back to his home, and rejoining the party upon visiting him in his room.
- Charlene (called Shirley in the Japanese version): One of the Soldiers in the game, she specializes in firearms and can wield guns that other characters cannot use.
- Rashid: The second Soldier in the game, he specializes in melee weapons and can wield swords and other cutting weapons that other characters cannot use.
- Alpha: The third and hidden Soldier in the game, she is a cyborg. Alpha cannot wield any weapons, but can use its internal weapons system to devastate almost any opponents encountered. If she dies in battle a certain number of times, she can be brought to Dr. Palm to be manufactured into a powerful tank part.

Furthermore, there are four different breeds of dogs, each with their unique combat and non-combat abilities, such as beam weaponry and medical kits. The breeds are Shiba Inu, (nicknamed as Shiba) St. Bernard, (nicknamed as Bernie) Boston Terrier (nicknamed as Terry) and Tosa.

=== Synopsis ===
While the game is mostly non-linear with multiple endings, the primary plot arc is revealed by travelling from the east side of the map to the west, culminating near the final fortress-city of Hell's Keep located in the western desert. During the journey, the protagonist, a newly-starting hunter (default name "Syu", though only mentioned in the Japanese version), encounters a legendary Hunter "Scarlett", who assists him with one of his early bounties and introduces him to bounty hunting. He also meets Rosa Beldaire, a wealthy heiress who collects tanks and becomes Syu's rival, and a mysterious man named Alex who, along with his cohorts Bonnie and Clyde, appear to be searching for something among several ruins in the world.

After reaching the frontier town of Alice One in the central region of the map, Syu's father Eddy, a famous bounty hunter, puts Syu in contact with Leon, a researcher who has discovered evidence of a pre-Great Destruction facility codenamed, "Ziggurat". Visiting Leon's office later results in Syu finding Scarlett searching Leon's room for information, but she accidentally injures Syu's arm in the encounter, requiring him to receive a cybernetic replacement. After the player visits a certain number of cities, Leon is attacked by Bonnie and Clyde, who ransack his house; he informs Syu that they took his information on Ziggurat, and gives Syu the facility's location near the city of Hell's Keep, in the world's western desert.

Syu travels to Ziggurat, revealing it to be a massive missile silo containing an intact ICBM from before the Great Destruction. Eddy, who arrived prior, reveals that Alex is attempting to re-activate the facility and launch the missile, but he has been injured fighting the tower's defenses, and tasks Syu with finishing the job. Fighting past Bonnie, Clyde, and the defenses, Syu encounters Alex, who reveals he is actually an android built by "Noah", the supercomputer which caused the original Great Destruction in an attempt to destroy humanity to prevent an ecological disaster. Alex explains that, after Noah's defeat, he was given the directive to finish what Noah had started, and that he intends to launch the intact ICBM and start a nuclear holocaust; Syu defeats Alex and destroys the missile as it is launching. Afterwards, Syu, his team, and Eddy return home to recover, where Syu may choose whether to continue bounty hunting, or retire, though afterwards he may elect to continue their adventures.

== Development ==
Since the first game was published in 1991 by Data East, the series was famous for having a "high degree of freedom". However, in 2003, Data East became bankrupt, and the trademark "Metal Max" was registered by Shinjuku Express, so this entry of the series had to use a new trademark — "Metal Saga". The series' producer, Hiroshi Miyaoka was not involved in the development from the beginning and said: "I thought that I could not make Metal Max anymore, I thought I was really dying".

The game was published in June 2005 in Japan, and in March 2006, a "Best" version of the game was published and was cheaper than the original. The game received a Lite/Demo version that was published in North America in April 2006.

== Reception ==
Reception

Review scores
Publication	Score
1Up.com	4 out of 10
Famitsu	30 out of 40
GameSpot	6.3 out of 10
GameTrailers	5.2 out of 10
IGN	7.0 out of 10
X-Play	3 out of 5
Dengeki PlayStation	33 out of 40
Total PlayStation	8 out of 10

Although the game's sense of humor, music and solid hours of gameplay won it some positive marks, the overall impression of the title was decidedly mediocre. Reviewers scoffed at the dated graphics, lack of plot, and missing feeling of progression. As a result, a considerable amount of time was often spent by reviewers and gamers alike simply wandering around, trying to figure out what to do next. While the game had all the classic trappings for the genre, complete with its own quirky style, it seemed to lack the polish required to stand-out. GameSpot noted that "Metal Saga has the makings of a good role-playing game, but there's nothing to tie it all together".

In Japan, Metal Saga received a respectable 30 out of 40 from Famitsu magazine. Media Create reported that it was the top selling game in Japan during its week of release at 63,219 copies. By the end of 2005, the Japanese version of the game had sold 99,374 copies in the region.

== Sequels ==
There are four sequels of Metal Saga, none of them released in western world. The first sequel Metal Saga: Season of Steel was released in 2006 for the Nintendo DS and follows the story of the first Metal Max. The second sequel is a cellphone game and released in 2007. The third sequel, Metal Saga New Frontier, was an online browser game released in 2010. The fourth sequel is Metal Saga: The Ark of Wastes.
