= Atsuji Yamamoto =

Japanese manga artist and character designer

- 山本 貴嗣
- Born: January 1, 1959 (age 67); Yamaguchi, Japan
- Occupation: Manga artist
- Years active: 1978–present
- Notable work: Ultimate Teacher, Elf-17, Saber Cats

Atsuji Yamamoto (山本 貴嗣, Yamamoto Atsuji; born January 1, 1959) is a Japanese manga artist and character designer, best known for manga Ultimate Teacher, Elf-17 and Saber Cats, along with video game series Metal Max.
