= Metal Max 2 =

1993 video game

- Developers: Crea-Tech; Data East
- Publishers: Data East (Super Famicom); Now Production (GBA); Kadokawa Games (Nintendo DS)
- Designer: Hiroshi Miyaoka
- Series: Metal Max
- Platforms: Super Famicom, Game Boy Advance, Nintendo DS
- Release: Super Famicom: JP: March 5, 1993; Game Boy Advance: JP: July 20, 2003; Nintendo DS: JP: December 8, 2011
- Genre: Role-playing video game
- Mode: Single-player

Metal Max 2 (メタルマックス2) is the second entry in the Metal Max series. It is a vehicle combat RPG published in Japan by Data East in 1993 for the Super Famicom. Ten years later, the game was ported to the Game Boy Advance with a few new bounties by Now Production under the title Metal Max 2 Kai. In December 2011, a full remake with upgraded graphics in the vein of Metal Max 3 and using its game engine was released in Japan for the Nintendo DS and titled Metal Max 2 Reloaded.

== Gameplay ==
Much of the gameplay is similar to its predecessor, Metal Max. The game is open-ended and non-linear, with the player given the freedom to decide where to go and what missions to do in whichever order. The player can choose the character classes, such as a mechanic or soldier, for the player characters. The battles are turn-based, with the characters able to fight either on foot or using tanks. The tanks can be created and customized by the player, who can modify and enhance each part of a vehicle, though there is a weight limit to each tank. In certain areas where tanks cannot pass, the characters must engage the enemies on foot. The game also features gambling machines where minigames can be played, including third-person shooter and racing games.

== Synopsis ==
The Grappler Army led by Ted Broiler has attacked the village of Modo, the protagonist who is the one of survivors embarks on a journey to destroy Grapplers.

== Release ==
Metal Max 2 Reloaded, the Nintendo DS remake, was announced in July 2011. It added a shared inventory, option to play as a female, okama or reijin, new character classes, subclasses and skills from Metal Max 3, new characters, bounties, bosses, sidequests, locations, items and vehicles, expanded storyline and backstories of characters and monsters, increased difficulty over the SNES and GBA versions, the final boss of the game has a third form and a New Game+ option has been added. An English fan translation of Metal Max 2 Reloaded was finished.
