= Crea-Tech =

Japanese video game developer

Crea-Tech 有限会社クレアテック
- Founded: October 20, 1988
- Founder: Hiroshi Miyaoka
- Headquarters: Koto, Tokyo, Japan
- Key people: Hiroshi Miyaoka
- Products: Metal Max series
- Services: Planning and development of video games Planning and production of animation magazines and books, etc.
- Website: www.crea-tech.net

Crea-Tech (Japanese: 有限会社クレアテック) was a Japanese video game developer based in Koto, Tokyo, Japan, which was founded by Hiroshi Miyaoka in 1988. The company was best known for developing the role-playing video game series Metal Max. They also developed many board games. The company developed console games mainly, but also had some computer games and mobile games.

== Products ==
- Metal Max series
  - Metal Max – NES
  - Metal Max 2 – SNES
  - Metal Max 3 – Nintendo DS
- Tenkuu no Restaurant – PlayStation
- Tenkuu no Restaurant Hello! Project Ver. - PlayStation
- Tower Dream – SNES, PlayStation
- Itadaki Street 3 – PS2
- CATAN – PC, PS2
- Pikiinya! – SNES
- Genjū Ryodan – SNES
- Hero Connection – Mobile
