= The Nolans discography =

- Studio albums: 15
- EPs: 4
- Compilation albums: 35
- Singles: 35
- Video albums: 2

This article is the discography of Irish pop band the Nolans, known as the Nolan Sisters between 1974 and 1979.

== Albums ==
=== Studio albums ===
Year	Title	Details	Peak chart positions					Certifications and sales
Year	Title	Details	UK	AUS	JPN	NZ	SWE	Certifications and sales
1972	The Singing Nolans	Released: June 1972; Label: Nevis; Formats: LP	—	—	—	—	—	
1975	The Nolan Sisters	Released: 1975; Label: Hanover Grand; Formats: LP	—	—	—	—	—	
1978	20 Giant Hits	Released: 6 July 1978; Label: Target; Formats: LP, MC; Released in Japan in February 1981	3	—	38	—	—	UK: Gold; JPN: 17,370
1979	Nolan Sisters	Released: 19 November 1979; Label: Epic; Formats: LP, MC; Released in Japan as Dancing Sisters	15	—	3	—	—	UK: Gold; JPN: 156,020
1980	Making Waves	Released: 17 October 1980; Label: Epic; Formats: LP, MC	11	10	1	1	2	UK: Gold; JPN: 550,800
1982	Portrait	Released: 19 March 1982; Label: Epic; Formats: CD, LP, MC; Released in Japan in December 1981 as Don't Love Me Too Hard	7	54	47	—	39	UK: Gold; JPN: 41,230
1984	Girls Just Wanna Have Fun!	Released: 1 November 1984; Label: Towerbell; Formats: CD, LP, MC	39	—	—	—	—	UK: Silver
1986	Tenderly	Released: 1986; Label: Stoic/Spartan; Formats: LP	—	—	—	—	—	
1991	Playback Part 2	Released: 21 July 1991; Label: Teichiku; Formats: CD, MC; Momoe Yamaguchi cover album; Japan-only release	—	—	77	—	—	JPN: 11.970
1991	Rock and Rolling Idol	Released: 21 August 1991; Label: Teichiku; Formats: CD; Kyoko Koizumi cover album; Japan-only release	—	—	88	—	—	JPN: 14,560
1991	Tidal Wave	Released: 21 September 1991; Label: Teichiku; Formats: CD; J-pop cover album; Japan-only release	—	—	99	—	—	JPN: 3,090
1992	The Hottest Place on Earth	Released: 21 May 1992; Label: Teichiku; Formats: CD; Featuring Princess Princess cover songs; Japan-only release	—	—	—	—	—	
1992	Please Don't	Released: 23 September 1992; Label: Teichiku; Formats: CD; Kayōkyoku cover album; Japan-only release	—	—	—	—	—	
2005	The Nolans Sing Momoe 2005	Released: 19 January 2005; Label: SMDR GT Music; Formats: CD; Japan-only release; Re-recording of Playback Part 2	—	—	—	—	—	
2009	I'm in the Mood Again	Released: 28 September 2009; Label: Universal; Formats: CD	22	—	—	—	—	

=== Compilation albums ===
Year	Title	Details	Peak chart positions		Certifications and sales
Year	Title	Details	UK	JPN	Certifications and sales
1979	The Best of the Nolans Vol 1	Released: May 1979; Label: Pickwick; Formats: LP, MC; Tracks are mainly from 20 Giant Hits with a few additions; The two albums were combined and released as The Nolan Sisters Collection in June 1980	—	—	
1979	The Best of the Nolans Vol 2	Released: May 1979; Label: Pickwick; Formats: LP, MC; Tracks are mainly from 20 Giant Hits with a few additions; The two albums were combined and released as The Nolan Sisters Collection in June 1980	—	—	
1980	The Nolans	Released: 1980; Label: Boulevard; Formats: LP; Compilation of tracks of the Singing Nolans remastered and remixed; Released in Japan on 21 May 1981 by Nevis	—	—	
1981	Sexy Music	Released: 21 March 1981; Label: Epic; Formats: LP; Japan-only release	—	2	JPN: 541,930
1981	All About Nolans	Released: 21 November 1981; Label: Epic; Formats: 2×LP; Japan-only release	—	30	JPN: 58,290
1981	Every Home Should Have One	Released: 1981; Label: Epic; Formats: Picture LP; Coca-Cola Japan promotional LP	—	—	
1982	Altogether	Released: 5 November 1982; Label: Epic; Formats: LP	52	—	UK: Silver
1983	Portrait	Released: January 1983; Label: Epic; Formats: LP; US-only release; Despite having the same name and artwork as the studio album, this album has different tracks	—	—	
1983	Harmony	Released: 1983; Label: Everest; Formats: LP, MC	—	—	
1991	Christmas Pops in Japan	Released: 23 October 1991; Label: Teichiku; Formats: CD; Japan-only release; As the Nolans & Friends	—	—	
1991	Japanese Pops TV CM Hit Collection	Released: 21 November 1991; Label: Teichiku; Formats: CD; Japan-only release; As the Nolans & Friends	—	—	
1991	The Nolans Super Best Hits	Released: 21 December 1991; Label: Teichiku; Formats: CD; Japan-only release	—	—	
1992	Valentine Pops in Japan	Released: 10 January 1992; Label: Teichiku; Formats: CD; Japan-only release; As the Nolans & Friends	—	—	
1992	Love Ballad Best Hits	Released: 10 January 1992; Label: Teichiku; Formats: CD; Japan-only release; As the Nolans & Friends	—	—	
1992	TV Memories for You II	Released: 22 January 1992; Label: Teichiku; Formats: CD; Japan-only release; As the Nolans & Friends	—	—	
1992	TV CM Hit Collection	Released: 22 January 1992; Label: Teichiku; Formats: CD; Japan-only release; As the Nolans & Friends	—	—	
1992	New Music Pops in Japan	Released: 15 February 1992; Label: Teichiku; Formats: CD; Japan-only release; As the Nolans & Friends	—	—	
1992	Graduation	Released: 15 February 1992; Label: Teichiku; Formats: CD; Japan-only release; As the Nolans & Friends	—	—	
1992	Colorful Nolans	Released: 21 February 1992; Label: Teichiku; Formats: CD; Japan-only release	—	—	
1992	It's True What They Say	Released: 18 March 1992; Label: Teichiku; Formats: CD; Japan-only release	—	—	
1992	New Music Pops TV CM Hits Collection II	Released: 18 March 1992; Label: Teichiku; Formats: CD; Japan-only release; As the Nolans & Friends	—	—	
1992	Days That Used to Be	Released: 18 March 1992; Label: Teichiku; Formats: CD; Japan-only release; As the Nolans & Friends	—	—	
1992	Lost, Lonely Beaches	Released: 21 June 1992; Label: Teichiku; Formats: CD; Japan-only release	—	—	
1992	TV Memories for You III	Released: 22 July 1992; Label: Teichiku; Formats: CD; Japan-only release; As the Nolans & Friends	—	—	
1993	Valentine Pops in Japan '93	Released: 21 January 1993; Label: Teichiku; Formats: CD; Japan-only release; As the Nolans & Friends	—	—	
1993	Graduation	Released: 21 February 1993; Label: Teichiku; Formats: CD; Japan-only release; As the Nolans & Friends; Different from the 1992 album	—	—	
1993	Celebration Royal Wedding	Released: 21 March 1993; Label: Teichiku; Formats: CD; Japan-only release; As the Nolans & Friends	—	—	
1996	The Best of the Nolans	Released: May 1996; Label: Epic; Formats: CD; Reissued by Camden in May 2009	—	—	UK: Silver
1996	Very Best of the Nolans	Released: 26 July 1996; Label: Summit; Formats: CD, MC	—	—	
2005	The Singles Collection	Released: 24 March 2005; Label: Epic; Formats: CD, CD+DVD; Japan-only release	—	88	JPN: 8,908
2005	All About the Nolans: 25th Anniversary Box	Released: 20 July 2005; Label: Epic; Formats: 3×CD+DVD box set; Japan-only release	—	—	
2017	The Nolans Sings J-Pop	Released: 19 July 2017; Label: Pony Canyon; Formats: CD; Japan-only release	—	—	
2018	Chemistry: The Ultimate Collection	Released: 27 July 2018; Label: Epic; Formats: CD+DVD	—	—	
2020	Gold	Released: 23 October 2020; Label: Crimson; Formats: 3×CD	25	—	
"—" denotes releases that did not chart or were not released in that territory.

=== Video albums ===
Year	Title	Details	Certifications and sales
2007	Video Clips	Released: 25 April 2007; Label: Epic; Formats: DVD; Japan-only release	
2009	I'm in the Mood Again Tour – The Nolans Live	Released: 9 November 2009; Label: Universal; Medium: DVD	UK: Gold

== EPs and mini-albums ==
Year	Title	Details	Peak chart positions	Certifications and sales
Year	Title	Details	JPN	Certifications and sales
1972	The Singing Nolans (Silent Night)	Released: December 1972; Label: Nevis; Formats: 7-inch EP	—	
1980	Dancing Sisters	Released: 21 July 1980; Label: Epic; Format: 10-inch mini-album; Japan-only release	12	JPN: 56,190
1983	Greatest Original Hits – 4 Track E.P.	Released: March 1983; Label: Epic; Formats: 7-inch EP	—	
1984	The Nolans	Released: March 1984; Label: Scoop 33; Formats: 7-inch EP, MC	—	
"—" denotes releases that did not chart or were not released

== Singles ==
Year	Title	Peak chart positions										Certifications	Album
Year	Title	IRE	UK	AUS	BEL (FL)	GER	JPN	NL	NZ	SA	SWE	Certifications	Album
1972	"Blackpool" (as the Singing Nolans)	—	—	—	—	—	—	—	—	—	—		Non-album singles
1974	"But I Do" (as the Nolan Sisters)	—	—	—	—	—	—	—	—	—	—		Non-album singles
1975	"(Won't You) Make a Little Sunshine Shine" (as Nolan Sisters)	—	—	—	—	—	—	—	—	—	—		Non-album singles
1976	"Rain" (as the Nolan Sisters)	—	—	—	—	—	—	—	—	—	—		Non-album singles
1976	"Thanks for Calling" (as Nolan Sisters)	—	—	—	—	—	—	—	—	—	—		Non-album singles
1976	"When You Are a King" (as the Nolan Sisters)	—	—	—	—	—	—	—	—	—	—		Non-album singles
1977	"Love Transformation" (as Nolan Sisters)	—	—	—	—	—	—	—	—	—	—		Non-album singles
1977	"Love Bandit" (as Nolan Sisters)	—	—	—	—	—	—	—	—	—	—		Non-album singles
1978	"Don't It Make My Brown Eyes Blue" (as the Nolan Sisters)	—	—	—	—	—	—	—	—	—	—		20 Giant Hits
1979	"Harry My Honolulu Lover" (as Nolan Sisters)	—	—	—	—	—	—	—	—	—	—		Non-album single
1979	"Spirit, Body and Soul" (as Nolan Sisters)	—	34	—	—	—	—	—	—	—	—		Nolan Sisters
1979	"I'm in the Mood for Dancing"	2	3	43	4	74	1	3	5	1	—	UK: Gold	Nolan Sisters
1980	"Don't Make Waves"	5	12	—	30	—	—	—	23	5	—		Making Waves
1980	"Gotta Pull Myself Together"	8	9	3	—	—	9	—	2	—	20	UK: Silver	Making Waves
1980	"Who's Gonna Rock You"	14	12	—	—	—	21	—	—	—	—		Making Waves
1981	"I'd Like to Teach the World to Sing" (Japan-only release)	—	—	—	—	—	—	—	—	—	—		20 Giant Hits
1981	"Attention to Me"	5	9	94	6	—	—	7	—	—	16	UK: Silver	Making Waves
1981	"Sexy Music" (Japan-only release)	—	—	—	—	—	7	—	—	—	—		Making Waves
1981	"Chemistry"	11	15	51	—	—	23	—	—	—	—		Portrait
1981	"Don't Love Me Too Hard"	17	14	—	—	—	61	—	30	—	—		Portrait
1982	"Crashing Down"	—	—	—	—	—	86	—	—	—	—		Portrait
1982	"Dragonfly"	—	—	—	—	—	—	—	—	—	—		Altogether
1983	"Dressed to Kill"	—	103	—	—	—	—	—	—	—	—		Non-album single
1985	"Girls Just Wanna Have Fun" (Japan-only release)	—	—	—	—	—	—	—	—	—	—		Girls Just Wanna Have Fun!
1985	"Goodbye Nothin' to Say"	—	—	—	—	—	—	—	—	—	—		Non-album singles
1986	"Let's Spend the Night Together"	—	—	—	—	—	—	—	—	—	—		Non-album singles
1989	"I'm in the Mood for Dancin '89" (re-recording)	—	99	—	—	—	—	—	—	—	—		Non-album singles
1991	"Take Me All" (Japan-only release)	—	—	—	—	—	—	—	—	—	—		Playback Part 2
1991	"Rock and Rolling Idol" (Japan-only release)	—	—	—	—	—	—	—	—	—	—		Rock and Rolling Idol
1991	"Tidal Wave" (Japan-only release)	—	—	—	—	—	—	—	—	—	—		Tidal Wave
1991	"Sexy Music" (re-recording; Japan-only release)	—	—	—	—	—	—	—	—	—	—		The Nolans Super Best Hits
1992	"Colourful Nolans" (Japan-only release)	—	—	—	—	—	—	—	—	—	—		Non-album single
1992	"Mother Earth" (Japan-only release)	—	—	—	—	—	—	—	—	—	—		The Hottest Place on Earth
1995	"I'm in the Mood for Dancing" (re-recording)	—	51	—	—	—	—	—	—	—	—		Non-album singles
2006	"Won't Be Long" (Japan-only release)	—	—	—	—	—	—	—	—	—	—		Non-album singles
"—" denotes releases that did not chart or were not released in that territory.
