= Wink Hot Singles =

Compilation album by Wink
- Released: November 1, 1990
- Recorded: 1988–1990
- Genres: J-pop; dance-pop
- Language: Japanese
- Label: Polystar
- Producer: Haruo Mizuhashi

Wink chronology
Velvet (1990)	Wink Hot Singles (1990)	Crescent (1990)

Singles from Wink Hot Singles
- 1. "Amaryllis" Released: September 7, 1988

Wink Hot Singles (ウィンク・ホット・シングルズ, Uinku Hotto Shinguruzu) is the first compilation album by Japanese idol duo Wink, released by Polystar on November 1, 1990. It covers the duo's singles from 1988 to 1990 and features a remix medley as the final track. A limited edition release included an 8 cm mini disc with two bonus tracks.

The album peaked at No. 5 on Oricon's albums chart and sold over 203,000 copies. It was also certified Gold by the RIAJ.

== Track listing ==
CD
No.	Title	Lyrics	Music	Arrangement	Length
1.	"Sugar Baby Love"	Joe Lemon	Wayne Bickerton; Tony Waddington	Shirō Sagisu	3:52
2.	"Amaryllis" (Amaririsu (アマリリス))	Yukinojo Mori	Ken Satō	Shigeru Suzuki	3:54
3.	"Ai ga Tomaranai (Turn It into Love)" ((愛が止まらない 〜TURN IT INTO LOVE〜; "Love Doesn't Stop ~Turn It into Love~"))	Neko Oikawa	Mike Stock; Matt Aitken; Pete Waterman	Motoki Funayama	3:32
4.	"Namida wo Misenai de (Boys Don't Cry)" ((涙をみせないで～Boys Don't Cry～; "Don't Show Your Tears"))	Oikawa	Matjaž Kosi	Funayama	3:44
5.	"Samishii Nettaigyo" ((淋しい熱帯魚; "Lonely Tropical Fish"))	Oikawa	Masaya Ozeki	Funayama	4:29
6.	"One Night in Heaven (Mayonaka no Angel)" ((One Night In Heaven 〜真夜中のエンジェル〜; "One Night in Heaven ~Midnight Angel~"))	Takashi Matsumoto	Steve Lironi; Dan Navarro	Funayama	4:06
7.	"Sexy Music"	Oikawa	Ben Findon; Mike Myers; Bob Puzey	Satoshi Kadokura	3:41
8.	"Yoru ni Hagurete (Where Were You Last Night)" ((夜にはぐれて 〜Where Were You Last Night〜))	Oikawa	Norell Oson Bard	Kadokura	4:25
9.	"Non-Stop Mix"	See below		Hiroaki Sugawara; Kunihiko Imai	11:01

Non-Stop Mix
No.	Title	Lyrics	Music	Length
1.	"Ginsei Club (I'm in Mood for Dancing)" ((銀星倶楽部 〜I'm In Mood For Dancing〜))	Sayako Morimoto	Findon; Myers; Puzey
2.	"Samishii Nettaigyo"
3.	"Ai ga Tomaranai (Turn It into Love)"
4.	"Sugar Baby Love"
5.	"Yoru ni Hagurete (Where Were You Last Night)"
6.	"Namida wo Misenai de (Boys Don't Cry)"

Limited Edition bonus CD
No.	Title	Lyrics	Music	Arrangement	Length
1.	"Omoide wo Aishiteta" ((思い出を愛してた; "I Love Memories"))	Morimoto	Hitoshi Haba	Funayama
2.	"Omoide wo Aishiteta" (Original Karaoke)

== Charts ==
Chart (1990)	Peak position
Japanese Albums (Oricon)	5

== Certification ==
Region	Certification	Certified units/sales
Japan (RIAJ)	Gold	200,000^{^}
^{^} Shipments figures based on certification alone.

== See also ==
- 1990 in Japanese music
