= Wink First Live Shining Star =

Live album by Wink
- Released: May 25, 1990
- Recorded: January 20, 1990 (Sendai); January 22, 1990 (Hamamatsu)
- Venues: Miyagi Prefectural Auditorium (Sendai); Iwata Citizens' Cultural Hall (Hamamatsu)
- Genres: J-pop; dance-pop
- Length: 51:06
- Language: Japanese
- Label: Polystar
- Producer: Haruo Mizuhashi

Wink chronology
Twin Memories (1989)	Wink First Live Shining Star (1990)	Velvet (1990)

Wink First Live Shining Star is a live album by Japanese idol duo Wink, released by Polystar on May 25, 1990. The album was recorded live at the duo's concert at the Miyagi Prefectural Auditorium in Sendai on January 20, 1990, and at the Iwata Citizens' Cultural Hall in Hamamatsu on January 22, 1990.

The album hit No. 1 on Oricon's albums chart and sold over 111,000 copies. It was also certified Gold by the RIAJ.

== Track listing ==
No.	Title	Lyrics	Music	Length
1.	"Sugar Baby Love"	Joe Lemon	Wayne Bickerton; Tony Waddington	4:46
2.	"Ai ga Tomaranai (Turn It into Love)" ((愛が止まらない 〜TURN IT INTO LOVE〜; "Love Doesn't Stop ~Turn It into Love~"))	Neko Oikawa	Mike Stock; Matt Aitken; Pete Waterman	5:03
3.	"Kaze no Prelude" (Kaze no Pureryūdo (風の前奏曲（プレリュード）; "Wind Prelude"))	Joe Lemon	Akira Mitake	4:49
4.	"Joanna"	Oikawa	Robert Earl Bell; Ronald Nathan Bell; James Bonnefond; George Melvin Brown; James "J.T." Taylor; Claydes Charles Smith; Clifford Adams; Curtis "Fitz" Williams	4:51
5.	"Fuyu no Photograph" (Fuyu no Fotogurafu (冬のフォトグラフ; "Winter Photograph"))	Yukinojo Mori	Yasuhiro Kido	5:35
6.	"Amaryllis" (Amaririsu (アマリリス))	Mori	Ken Satō	3:56
7.	"One Night in Heaven (Mayonaka no Angel)" ((One Night In Heaven 〜真夜中のエンジェル〜; "One Night in Heaven ~Midnight Angel~"))	Takashi Matsumoto	Steve Lironi; Dan Navarro	4:14
8.	"Yakan Hikō (Never Marry a Railroad Man)" ((夜間飛行 〜Never Marry A Railroad Man〜; "Night Flight ~Never Marry a Railroad Man~"))	Sayako Morimoto	Robbie van Leeuwen	4:14
9.	"Samishii Nettaigyo" ((淋しい熱帯魚; "Lonely Tropical Fish"))	Oikawa	Masaya Ozeki	4:53
10.	"Suteki ni Happy Birthday" ((素敵にHappy Birthday; "A Nice Happy Birthday"))	Machiko Ryū	Takayuki Baba	3:58
11.	"Shining Star"	Matsumoto	Ozeki	4:47
Total length:				51:06

== Charts ==
Chart (1990)	Peak position
Japanese Albums (Oricon)	1

== Certification ==
Region	Certification	Certified units/sales
Japan (RIAJ)	Gold	200,000^{^}
^{^} Shipments figures based on certification alone.

== See also ==
- 1990 in Japanese music
