= 1990 in Japanese music =

In 1990 (Heisei 2), Japanese music was released on records, and there were charts, awards, contests and festivals.

During that year, Japan continued to have the second largest music market in the world, twelve percent of all recorded music sales took place in that country, and the value of recorded music sold there was $2.9818 billion.

== Awards, contests and festivals ==
The 32nd Osaka International Festival (Japanese: 大阪国際フェスティバル) was held from 7 April to 11 May 1990. The international contest of the 19th Tokyo Music Festival was held on 1 June 1990. The 4th Teens' Music Festival was held on 8 August 1990. The national contest of the 4th "Band Explosion" festival was held on 26 October 1990, and the international contest was held on 28 October 1990. The final of the 19th FNS Music Festival was held on 11 December 1990. The 32nd Japan Record Awards were held on 31 December 1990. The 41st NHK Kōhaku Uta Gassen was held on 31 December 1990.

Southern All Stars won the grand prix for Japanese artist of the year at the 4th Japan Gold Disc Awards.

== Number one singles ==
Oricon

The following reached number 1 on the weekly Oricon Singles Chart:

Issue date	Song	Artist
1 January	"Christmas Eve"	Tatsuro Yamashita
8 January	(No information)	
15 January	"Christmas Eve"	Tatsuro Yamashita
22 January	"Kuchibiru Kara Biyaku"	Shizuka Kudo
29 January	"Midnight Taxi"	Miho Nakayama
5 February	"Aku no Hana"	Buck-Tick
12 February	"Kuchibiru Kara Biyaku"	Shizuka Kudo
19 February	"Kouya No Megaropolis"	Hikaru Genji
26 February	"No Titlist"	Rie Miyazawa
5 March	"Imasugu Kiss Me"	Lindberg
12 March	"Minogashitekureyo"	Kyōko Koizumi
19 March	"Imasugu Kiss Me"	Lindberg
26 March	"1990"	Complex
2 April	"Imasugu Kiss Me"	Lindberg
9 April	"Sexy Music"	Wink
16 April	"Sexy Music"	Wink
23 April	"Roman Hikō"	Kome Kome Club
30 April	"Oh Yeah!"	Princess Princess
7 May	"Oh Yeah!"	Princess Princess
14 May	"Sayonara Jinrui"	Tama
21 May	"Senryū no Shizuku"	Shizuka Kudo
28 May	"Jealousy O Nemurasete"	Kyosuke Himuro
4 June	"Pure Gold"	Eikichi Yazawa
11 June	"Jealousy O Nemurasete"	Kyosuke Himuro
18 June	"Sayonara Jinrui"	Tama
25 June	"Taiyō no Komachi Angel"	B'z
2 July	"Nichiyoubi"	Jitterin' Jinn
9 July	"Odoru Pompokolin"	B.B.Queens
16 July	"The Point of Lovers' Night"	TM Network
23 July	"Odoru Pompokolin"	B.B.Queens
30 July	"Dear Friend"	Akina Nakamori
6 August	"Jōnetsu no Bara"	The Blue Hearts
13 August	"Dear Friend"	Akina Nakamori
20 August	"Odoru Pompokolin"	B.B.Queens
27 August	"Co Co Ro"	Hikaru Genji
3 September	"Odoru Pompokolin"	B.B.Queens
10 September	"Odoru Pompokolin"	B.B.Queens
17 September	"Odoru Pompokolin"	B.B.Queens
24 September	"Odoru Pompokolin"	B.B.Queens
1 October	"Watashi ni Tsuite"	Shizuka Kudo
8 October	"Time to Count Down"	TMN
15 October	"Easy Come, Easy Go!"	B'z
22 October	"Easy Come, Easy Go!"	B'z
29 October	"Easy Come, Easy Go!"	B'z
5 November	"Itoshii Hitoyo Good Night..."	B'z
12 November	"Warratteyo"	Hikaru Genji
19 November	"Mizu ni Sashita Hana"	Akina Nakamori
26 November	"Silent Eve"	Midori Karashima
3 December	"Julian"	Princess Princess
10 December	"Silent Eve"	Midori Karashima
17 December	"Silent Eve"	Midori Karashima
24 December	"Ai wa Katsu"	Kan
31 December	"Ai wa Katsu"	Kan

== Number one albums ==
Music Labo

The following reached number 1 on the Music Labo chart:

- 8 January: Gigs Just A Hero Tour 1986 - Boøwy
- 15 January: Voice - Hound Dog
- 22 January, 29 January and 5 February: Southern All Stars - Southern All Stars
- 12 February: Aku no Hana - Buck-Tick
- 5 March: Tsuyoshi Nagabuchi Live 89 - Tsuyoshi Nagabuchi
- 12 March: Greatest Venus - Go-Bang's
- 19 March: Cue - Hiroshi Takano
- 26 March and 2 April: Computer Game Music Dragon Quest 4. This album is the soundtrack of Dragon Quest IV.
- 9 April: San - Otokogumi
- 16 April: Rosette - Shizuka Kudo
- 23 April: Eeney Meeney Barbee Moe - Barbee Boys
- 30 April: Romantic 1990 - Complex
- Far East Cafe - Kazumasa Oda
- 5 June: Wink First Live Shining Star - Wink
- 12 June: Sprinkle - Kiyotaka Sugiyama
- I'm Breathless - Madonna
- Yoru o Yuke - Miyuki Nakajima
- 16 July: Tokyo - Misato Watanabe
- 23 July and 30 July: Bonga Wanga - Toshinobu Kubota
- 6 August: Anzen Chitai 7 Yume No Miyako - Anzen Chitai
- 27 August: The Best of Dreams - Rebecca
- 3 September: Jeep - Tsuyoshi Nagabuchi
- 10 September and 17 September: Inamura Jane - Southern All Stars Soundtrack of Inamura Jane.
- 24 September: Apollo - Senri Oe
- 8 October: Baby a Go Go - RC Succession
- 15 October: Kedamono No Arashi - Unicorn
- Justice - Hideaki Tokunaga
- Kokon Tozai - Chisato Moritaka
- 3 November: Rythym Red - TMN
- 10 November: Wonder 3 - Dreams Come True
- 19 November: Risky - B'z
- 3 December and 10 December: Heaven's Door - Yumi Matsutoya

Oricon

The following reached number 1 on the Oricon Albums Chart:

- 19 February and 26 February: Hurry Up Mode (1990 Mix) by Buck-Tick
- 24 September: Bust Waste Hip by The Blue Hearts
- 31 December: Princess Princess by Princess Princess

== Annual charts ==
B.B.Queens' Odoru Pompokolin was number 1 in the Oricon annual singles chart.

== Film and television ==
The music of Dreams and Childhood Days, both by Shin'ichirō Ikebe, won the 45th Mainichi Film Award for Best Music. The music of Dreams and Childhood Days and Ruten no umi, all by Shin'ichirō Ikebe, won the 14th Japan Academy Film Prize for Best Music (awarded in 1991).

Sherry (pseudonym of Izumi Kato) released the Record of Lodoss War OVA song "Kaze No Fantasia" (Japanese: 風のファンタジア). The music of Nadia: The Secret of Blue Water includes the song "Blue Water" by Miho Morikawa.

== Debuts ==
- Rumi Shishido released her debut single "Cosmic Rendezvous"
- Taeko Nishino released her debut single "A Kyu Kiss"

== Other singles released ==
- Gallery and Shōnen no Hitomi ni... by Yōko Oginome
- Yoru ni Hagurete (Where Were You Last Night) and New Moon ni Aimashō by Wink
- Michi, Kusai Mono ni wa Futa wo Shiro!! and Ame by Chisato Moritaka
- Semi-sweet Magic and Megamitachi no Bōken by Miho Nakayama
- Lady-Go-Round and Be There by B'z
- Yume wo Shinjite by Hideaki Tokunaga
- Week End by X Japan

== Other albums and EPs released ==
- The Sheltering Sky by Ryuichi Sakamoto
- Knock on My Door and '91 Oginome Collection by Yōko Oginome
- Velvet, Wink Hot Singles and Crescent by Wink
- Unlimited by Shizuka Kudo
- All for You, Jeweluna and Collection II by Miho Nakayama
- Seiko by Seiko Matsuda
- Natural by T-Square
- Break Through and Wicked Beat by B'z
- Colors by Mari Hamada
- Symphonic Buck-Tick in Berlin by Buck-Tick
- Kiss My Thang: Toshinobu Kubota's Selection by Toshinobu Kubota
- Hard Way by Show-Ya
- The Ghost in Science by Susumu Hirasawa

== See also ==
- Timeline of Japanese music
- 1990 in Japan
- 1990 in music
- w:ja:1990年の音楽
