= Altogether =

Altogether may refer to:

- Altogether (The Nolans album)
- Altogether (TV series), a 1975 Canadian television series
- Altogether (Turnover album)

== See also ==
- The Altogether, a 2001 album by Orbital
