= Special to Me =

Single by Japanese idol duo Wink

Single by Wink

from the album Twin Memories
- Language: Japanese
- B-side: "One Night in Heaven (Mayonaka no Angel) [Remix]"
- Released: April 27, 2018
- Recorded: 1989
- Genre: J-pop; dance-pop
- Length: 3:39
- Label: Polystar
- Composers: Deborah F. Shane; Robert Hunter Caldwell; Marsha A. Radcliffe
- Lyricist: Neko Oikawa
- Producer: Haruo Mizuhashi

Wink singles chronology
"Angel Love Story (Akiiro no Tenshi)" (1995)	"Special to Me" (2018)

Music video
- "Special to Me" on YouTube

"Special to Me" is the 26th single by Japanese idol duo Wink. A Japanese-language cover of Bobby Caldwell's 1978 song, it was originally recorded in 1989 as part of the album Twin Memories. "Special to Me" was released as a 7" vinyl single by Polystar Records on April 27, 2018, to commemorate the duo's 30th anniversary. The B-side is a remix of Wink's sixth single "One Night in Heaven (Mayonaka no Angel)".

The single peaked at No. 196 on the Oricon's weekly charts.

== Track listing ==
All music is arranged by Motoki Funayama.

No.	Title	Lyrics	Music	Length
1.	"Special to Me"	Neko Oikawa	Deborah F. Shane; Robert Hunter Caldwell; Marsha A. Radcliffe	3:39
2.	"One Night in Heaven (Mayonaka no Angel) [Remix]" ((One Night In Heaven 〜真夜中のエンジェル〜; "One Night in Heaven ~Midnight Angel~"))	Takashi Matsumoto	Steve Lironi; Dan Navarro	5:04

== Charts ==
Chart (2018)	Peak position
Japanese Oricon Singles Chart	196
