= Twin Memories =

Studio album by Wink
- Released: December 1, 1989
- Recorded: 1989
- Genre: J-pop; dance-pop
- Length: 43:12
- Language: Japanese
- Label: Polystar
- Producer: Haruo Mizuhashi

Wink chronology
Especially for You: Yasashisa ni Tsutsumarete (1989)	Twin Memories (1989)	Wink First Live Shining Star (1990)

Singles from Twin Memories
- 1. "Samishii Nettaigyo" Released: July 5, 1989; 2. "One Night in Heaven (Mayonaka no Angel)" Released: November 1, 1989; 3. "Special to Me" Released: April 27, 2018

Twin Memories (ツイン・メモリーズ, Tsuin memorīzu) is the third studio album by Japanese idol duo Wink, released by Polystar on December 1, 1989. It features the No. 1 singles "Samishii Nettaigyo" and "One Night in Heaven (Mayonaka no Angel)". Also included in the album are Japanese-language covers of Bobby Caldwell's "Special to Me", Paul Gurvitz's "I Never Stopped Loving You", REO Speedwagon's "In Your Letter", Shocking Blue's "Never Marry a Railroad Man", Kool & the Gang's "Joanna", and John Lennon's "Oh My Love". "Special to Me" was released as a promotional single in 2018 to celebrate the duo's 30th anniversary.

The album peaked at No. 2 on Oricon's albums chart and sold over 454,000 copies. It was also certified Platinum by the RIAJ.

== Track listing ==
All music is arranged by Motoki Funayama, except where indicated.

No.	Title	Lyrics	Music	Arrangement	Length
1.	"Oh My Love (Introduction)"	Sayako Morimoto	John Lennon; Yoko Ono	Satoshi Kadokura	0:32
2.	"One Night in Heaven (Mayonaka no Angel) [Remix]" ((One Night In Heaven 〜真夜中のエンジェル〜; "One Night in Heaven ~Midnight Angel~"))	Takashi Matsumoto	Steve Lironi; Dan Navarro		5:04
3.	"Special to Me"	Neko Oikawa	Deborah F. Shane; Robert Hunter Caldwell; Marsha A. Radcliffe		3:39
4.	"Shining Star"	Matsumoto	Masaya Ozeki		4:33
5.	"Sayonara Chīsana Crybaby" (Sayonara Chīsana Kuraibeibī (さよなら 小さなCrybaby; "Goodbye Little Crybaby"))	Keiko	Hitoshi Haba		4:47
6.	"Aishiteru (Never Stopped Loving You)" ((愛してる 〜Never Stopped Loving You〜; "I Love You ~Never Stopped Loving You~"))	Oikawa	Paul Gurvitz		5:06
7.	"In Your Letter"	Morimoto	Gary Richrath	Takao Sugiyama	3:22
8.	"Yakan Hikō (Never Marry a Railroad Man)" ((夜間飛行 〜Never Marry A Railroad Man〜; "Night Flight ~Never Marry a Railroad Man~"))	Morimoto	Robbie van Leeuwen	Sugiyama	4:14
9.	"Joanna"	Oikawa	Robert Earl Bell; Ronald Nathan Bell; James Bonnefond; George Melvin Brown; James "J.T." Taylor; Claydes Charles Smith; Clifford Adams; Curtis "Fitz" Williams		4:11
10.	"Samishii Nettaigyo [Remix]" ((淋しい熱帯魚; "Lonely Tropical Fish"))	Oikawa	Ozeki		5:05
11.	"Oh My Love"	Morimoto	Lennon; Ono	Kadokura	2:39
Total length:					43:12

2018 bonus tracks
No.	Title	Lyrics	Music	Arrangement	Length
12.	"Senaka made 500 Miles" (Senaka made Gohyaku Mairu (背中まで500マイル; "500 Miles and Back"))	Oikawa	Hedy West	Funayama	3:41
13.	"Cat-Walk Dancing"	Matsumoto	Haba	Funayama	4:13

== Charts ==
Chart (1989)	Peak position
Japanese Albums (Oricon)	2

== Certification ==
Region	Certification	Certified units/sales
Japan (RIAJ)	Platinum	400,000^{^}
^{^} Shipments figures based on certification alone.

== See also ==
- 1989 in Japanese music
