= Stars (B'z song) =

Single by B'z
- Language: Japanese
- B-side: "Dark Rainbow"; "Painkiller"; "Kimi no Naka de Odoritai 2023"
- Released: July 12, 2023
- Length: 3:55
- Label: Vermillion
- Composer: Tak Matsumoto
- Lyricist: Koshi Inaba
- Producer: Tak Matsumoto

B'z singles chronology
"Seimei/Still Alive" (2017)	"Stars" (2023)

"Stars" is the fifty-fourth single by the Japanese rock duo B'z. It was released on July 12, 2023, and is their first single in six years, after "Seimei/Still Alive", making it the longest gap between singles. It was released in commemoration of the band's 35th anniversary.

It was released in four editions: a regular CD edition, a CD+DVD edition and a CD+Blu-ray edition, both of which include footage of the band performing three songs live from Tokyo FM Hall, and an edition with the CD and a Jenga-like balance game, which includes 54 blocks, each engraved with one of the band's singles.

The single debuted atop the Oricon Singles Chart dated July 24, 2023, with sales of 117,600 copies, making this their 50th consecutive number 1 single. It debuted at number 4 on Billboard Japan's Japan Hot 100.

== Background ==
The song "Stars" commemorates the band's 35th anniversary, with the band comparing the progress they've made, and where they still want to go, to stars, "The songs we've made so far, the fans who have supported us since our debut, and what lies ahead as B'z aims to go somewhere further—all of these irreplaceable existences are 'stars.'" The song "Dark Rainbow" was written for the movie Omae no Tsumi o Jihaku Shiro. The single also includes a rerecording of the band's 2nd single, "Kimi no Naka de Odoritai".

== Track listing ==
All lyrics are written by Koshi Inaba; all music is composed by Tak Matsumoto.

No.	Title	Length
1.	"Stars"	3:55
2.	"Dark Rainbow"	4:16
3.	"Painkiller (ペインキラー, Painkiller)"	3:49
4.	"Kimi no Naka de Odoritai 2023 (君の中で踊りたい 2023, I Wanna Dance Inside You 2023)"	3:25
Total length:		15:25

DVD & Blu-ray: B'z Live From Tokyo FM Hall
No.	Title	Length
1.	"Dark Rainbow"
2.	"Kimi no Naka de Odoritai 2023"
3.	"Stars"

== Charts ==
=== Weekly charts ===
Chart (2023)	Peak position
Japan (Oricon)	1
Japan Hot 100 (Billboard Japan)	4
Japan Combined Singles (Oricon)	1
Japan Top Singles Sales (Billboard Japan)	1

=== Year-end charts ===
Chart (2023)	Position
Japan (Oricon)	57
Japan Top Singles Sales (Billboard Japan)	62

== Certifications ==
Region	Certification	Certified units/sales
Japan (RIAJ)	Gold	100,000^{^}
^{^} Shipments figures based on certification alone.
