= Itoshii Hitoyo Good Night... =

Single by B'z

from the album Risky
- Released: October 24, 1990
- Genre: Pop rock
- Label: BMG Japan
- Songwriters: Koshi Inaba; Tak Matsumoto
- Producer: Tak Matsumoto

B'z singles chronology
"Easy Come, Easy Go!" (1990)	"Itoshii Hitoyo Good Night..." (1990)	"Lady Navigation" (1991)

"Itoshii Hitoyo Good Night..." (愛しい人よGood Night..., "My Dearie, Good Night...") is the seventh single by B'z, released on October 24, 1990. This song is one of B'z many number-one singles on the Oricon chart. The single was re-released in 2003, and re-entered at number 12. It sold over 354,000 copies according to Oricon.

An edited version of the song plays over the opening credits of their video compilation Film Risky, while the B-side, a re-recorded version of "Guitar Kids Rhapsody" from their second album, Off the Lock, is one of the featured videos.

== Track listing ==
1. "Itoshii Hitoyo Good Night..." (愛しい人よGood Night...)
2. "Guitar Kids Rhapsody Camden Lock Style"

== Certifications ==
Region	Certification	Certified units/sales
Japan (RIAJ)	Platinum	400,000^{^}
^{^} Shipments figures based on certification alone.

== See also ==
- 1990 in Japanese music
