= East Asia (disambiguation) =

East Asia is a geocultural region of Asia.

East Asia, Eastern Asia, or Eastasia may also refer to:

- Eastern Asia (WGSRPD), a region used in recording the distribution of plants
- East Asia (album), a record by Miyuki Nakajima
- Eastasia (Nineteen Eighty-Four), a fictional superstate in George Orwell's book 1984
- Pacific Asia, the eastern edge of Asia
