= Altogether (The Nolans album) =

Greatest hits album by The Nolans
- Released: 5 November 1982
- Recorded: 1979–1982
- Genre: Pop
- Length: 49:26
- Label: Epic
- Producer: Ben Findon; Nicky Graham; Mike Myers; Tim Friese-Greene

The Nolans chronology
Portrait (1982)	Altogether (1982)	Girls Just Wanna Have Fun! (1984)

Altogether is a greatest hits album released by Irish/British pop group, The Nolans in 1982. It featured all the group's hits to this point, including their biggest "I'm in the Mood for Dancing".

== Background ==
By this time, The Nolans had scored a run of seven consecutive top 20 hit singles in the UK as well as four top 20 albums. This, their first compilation, was released at the beginning of the group's decline in the UK, and the lead single, "Dragonfly" failed to chart, only appearing in the bubbling-under section of the top 75. This song was a departure for the group, with it not being produced by either of their regular producers, Ben Findon or Nicky Graham, but by Tim Friese-Greene, who was responsible for the recent success of Tight Fit. The album itself also fared less well than expected when it peaked at No.52. It did however go on to be certified silver by the BPI for sales in excess of 60,000.

Of the tracks included, three were taken from Nolan Sisters (1979), six from Making Waves (1980) and four from Portrait (1982). Of these, 10 were single releases as well as three album track cover versions and a Japanese-only single release ("Sexy Music").

The Nolans went on a 21-date UK tour over November and December in support of the album. It was also at this time that the group were back to being a five-piece, with the return of former member, Anne Nolan. The quintet line-up was short-lived however as member Linda Nolan left the following year.

This was the last Nolans album released by Epic Records, and their final single with them came the following year.

== Track listing ==
All tracks are written by Ben Findon, Mike Myers and Robert Puzey except where noted.

Side one
No.	Title	Writer(s)	Album	Length
1.	"I'm in the Mood for Dancing"		Nolan Sisters, 1979	3:16
2.	"Attention to Me"		Making Waves, 1980	3:07
3.	"Don't Love Me Too Hard"		Portrait, 1982	3:43
4.	"Gotta Pull Myself Together"		Making Waves	2:43
5.	"Don't Make Waves"		Making Waves	3:40
6.	"Sexy Music"		Making Waves	3:37
7.	"Thank You for the Music"	Benny Andersson; Björn Ulvaeus	Nolan Sisters	4:11

Side one
No.	Title	Writer(s)	Album	Length
1.	"Dragonfly"	Tim Friese-Greene; Stevie Lange	Previously unreleased, 1982	3:37
2.	"Chemistry"	Nicky Graham; Robin Smith	Portrait	3:32
3.	"Who's Gonna Rock You"	Billy Ocean; Ken Gold	Making Waves	3:32
4.	"Every Home Should Have One"	Dominic Bugatti; Frank Musker	Portrait	3:38
5.	"Touch Me in the Morning"	Michael Masser; Ronald Miller	Making Waves	4:16
6.	"Crashing Down"		Portrait	3:24
7.	"Spirit, Body and Soul"		Nolan Sisters	3:10
