= Uta de Shika Ienai =

Studio album by Miyuki Nakajima
- Released: October 23, 1991
- Recorded: Burnish Stone, Sound Valley, Victor, Onkio Haus, Epicurus, and Studio ULTIMO
- Genre: Folk rock
- Length: 69:45
- Label: Pony Canyon/AARD-VARK, Yamaha Music Communications
- Producer: Ichizo Seo, Miyuki Nakajima

Miyuki Nakajima chronology
Yoru wo Yuke (1990)	Uta de Shika Ienai (1991)	East Asia (1992)

Uta de Shika Ienai (歌でしか言えない) is the 19th studio album by Japanese singer-songwriter Miyuki Nakajima, released in October 1991.

The album features remix version of "Tokyo Maigo", a song released as a less successful lead single in June 1991. Gospelesque "Odayaka na Jidai" is a remake version of a song that she originally contributed for the news program News Station aired on TV Asahi in the mid 1980s. "Ta-Wa-Wa" features horn sections that played by the members of a group Tokyo Ska Paradise Orchestra who were still not famous at that time.

Backing tracks of the songs like "Nagisa e" and "Minami Sanjou" were mostly recorded with North American session musicians including Abe Laboriel, Paulinho da Costa and Dean Parks. In addition to such musicians, Rita Coolidge participated in "Odayaka na Jidai" as one of the backing vocalists. Since Uta de shika Ienai album, Nakajima came to appoint those distinguished players for her recording.

== Track listing ==
All songs written and composed by Miyuki Nakajima, arranged by Ichizo Seo (except horn arrangement of "Ta-Wa-Wa" by Masahiko Kitahara, strings arrangement of "Sapporo Snowy" by Mitsuo Hagita).

1. "C.Q." – 7:55
2. "Odayaka na Jidai (おだやかな時代)" – 7:10
3. "Tokyo Maigo (トーキョー迷子)" [Album Mix] – 5:08
4. "Maybe" – 6:19
5. "Nagisa e (渚へ)" – 6:10
6. "Eikyū Ketsuban (永久欠番)" – 6:56
7. "Waratteyo Angel (笑ってよエンジェル)" – 5:15
8. "Ta-Wa-Wa (た・わ・わ)" – 4:50
9. "Sapporo Snowy (サッポロSNOWY)" – 5:40
10. "Minami Sanjou (南三条)" – 7:32
11. "Honō to Mizu (炎と水)" – 6:49

== Personnel ==
- Tsuyoshi Kon – Electric guitar, pedal-Steel Guitar, slide guitar
- Shigeru Suzuki – Electric guitar
- Paul Jackson, Jr. – Electric guitar
- Chuei Yoshikawa – Acoustic Guitar, flat mandolin
- Dean Parks – Acoustic Guitar
- Abraham Laboriel – Electric bass
- Yasuo Tomikura – Electric bass
- Chiharu Mikuzuki – Electric bass
- Kenji Takamizu – Electric bass
- Nobu Saito – Percussion
- Paulinho da Costa – Percussion
- John Robinson – Drums
- Hideo Yamaki – Drums
- Eiji Shimamura – Drums
- Elton Nagata – Keyboards
- Nobuo Kurata – Piano, keyboards, synth bass
- Ryoichi Kuniyoshi – Keyboards, synth bass
- Joe Group – Strings
- Nobuhiko Nakayama – Computer programming
- Keishi Urata – Computer programming, drum programming, synth percussion
- Tatsuhiko Mori – Computer programming, drum programming
- Ichizo Seo – Computer programming, drum programming, synth percussion, keyboards, piano, background vocals
- Ska Para Horns
  - Masahiko Kitahara – Trombone, horn arrangement
  - Nargo (credited to Kimiyoshi Nagoya) – Trumpet
  - Gamou – Tenor sax
- Toshihiko Furumura – Tenor sax
- Yasuhiro Kido – Background vocals
- Kiyoshi Hiyama – Background vocals
- Yuiko Tsubokura – Background vocals
- Kazuyo Sugimoto – Background vocals
- Maxi Anderson – Background vocals
- Clydene Jackson – Background vocals
- Carmen Twillie – Background vocals
- Monalisa Young – Background vocals
- Varelie Kashimura – Background vocals
- Joey Diggs – Background vocals
- David Lasley – Background vocals
- Arnold McCuller – Background vocals
- Fred White – Background vocals
- Rita Coolidge – Background vocals

== Chart positions ==
Year	Chart	Position	Sales	Certification (RIAJ)
1991	Japanese Oricon Weekly Albums Chart (Top 100)	4(CDDA)	197,000+	Platinum
1991	Japanese Oricon Weekly Albums Chart (Top 100)	47 (APO-CD)	197,000+	Platinum

== Release history ==
Country	Date	Label	Format	Catalog number
Japan	October 23, 1991	Pony Canyon	CD	PCCA-00311
Japan	October 23, 1991	Pony Canyon	APO-CD	PCCA-00315
Japan	October 23, 1991	Pony Canyon	Audio cassette	PCTA-00105
Japan	May 23, 2001	Yamaha Music Communications	CD	YCCW-00022
Japan	November 5, 2008	Yamaha Music Communications	CD	YCCW-10071
