= Odoru Pompokolin =

1990 song by B.B. Queens

Single by B.B.Queens

from the album We Are B.B.Queens
- B-side: "Yume Ippai (B.B.Queens Version)"
- Released: April 4, 1990
- Genre: J-pop, anison
- Length: 6:48
- Label: BMG Victor, Rhizome
- Composer: Tetsuro Oda
- Lyricist: Momoko Sakura

B.B.Queens singles chronology
"Odoru Pompokolin" (1990)	"Gingira Paradise" (1990)

"Odoru Pompokolin" (おどるポンポコリン, Odoru Ponpokorin; Dance the Pompokolin) is a song by Japanese pop group B.B.Queens, serving as their debut single on April 4, 1990. It was used as the original ending theme of the anime series Chibi Maruko-chan as well as the opening theme for the 1995 incarnation of the same name. On July 9, 1990, "Odoru Pompokolin" reached the top of the Oricon Singles Charts, and again on July 23, on August 20, before serving as the number 1 weekly song throughout the month of September 1990. It ultimately remained on the charts for a total of 54 weeks, sold 1.9 million copies, and won both record of the year and pop rock song of the year at the 32nd Japan Record Awards as well as the 1991 JASRAC Award. The song was composed and arranged by Tetsuro Oda with lyrics by Momoko Sakura, author of Chibi Maruko-chan.

"Odoru Pompokolin" became popular as an anime song, ranked eighth on a list of 100 unforgettable anime theme songs and first on a list of the top 20 anime theme songs of the 1990s, both by TV Asahi.

== Other versions ==
Covers include an uptempo happy hardcore version which was featured on Anime Speed, a heavy metal cover by Animetal on their fanclub-exclusive "For the Brave Hearts Only!" single, an English-language version titled "Dancing Pompokolin" by Captain Jack which was featured in the game Dance Dance Revolution and other music games, a version by ManaKana used as the Chibi Maruko-chan opening theme song from 1998 to 2000, and a cover by Kaela Kimura on her album 5 Years which has been used as the opening for the anime throughout 2010.

In 2011, B.B. Queens reunited and recorded a new version of "Odoru Pompokolin" to commemorate the 25th anniversary of Chibi Maruko-chan's initial manga release. This version with the subtitle "Chibi Maruko-chan Birthday 25th Version" (ちびまる子ちゃん 誕生 25th Version, Chibi Marukochan Tanjō 25th Version), connected with a new version of "Goodbye Morning" by Keiko Utoku and Fusanosuke Kondo, was released as a single the same year on May 1. This new version of the song also entered use as the Chibi Maruko-chan theme beginning with the May 1, 2011, broadcast of the new season.

On August 13, 2014, E-girls released a cover of "Odoru Ponpokorin" as its tenth single connected with a cover of "Happy! Fun! I Love It!" (うれしい！たのしい！大好き！, Ureshī! Tanoshī! Daisuki!) by Dreams Come True as the B-side. This version was used for three months as the opening song of the anime. The single sold 43,653 in its first week.

In May 2016, Twice Japanese members Sana and Momo did a musical version of the said song. The Thai version was then used for their first concert in Bangkok. In 2019, Japanese idol group Momoiro Clover Z released a version with an accompanying music video.

In December 2025, the official Chibi Maruko-chan website announced a cover performed by Ado to be used as the opening song starting on December 28, 2025.

== See also ==
- 1990 in Japanese music

Preceded by "Samishii Nettaigyo" (Wink)	Japan Record Award Grand Prix; 1990	Succeeded by "Ai wa Katsu" (Kan)
