= Yoru o Yuke =

Studio album by Miyuki Nakajima
- Released: June 13, 1990
- Recorded: Burnish Stone, Epicurus, Music Inn, Sound Valley (Tokyo, Japan)
- Genre: Folk rock
- Length: 56:03
- Label: Pony Canyon/AARD-VARK
- Producers: Ichizo Seo, Miyuki Nakajima

Miyuki Nakajima chronology
Kaikinetsu (1989)	Yoru o Yuke (1990)	Utadeshika Ienai (1991)

Yoru o Yuke (夜を往け) is the 18th studio album by Japanese singer-songwriter Miyuki Nakajima, released in June 1990. The album includes remix version of "Ashita", a top-20 charting smash hit single released in 1989 and certified gold by the RIAJ. After two months from release of the album, "with" was released as a single. The song was featured in the 1991 film My Sons, directed by Yoji Yamada.

Mixing of Yoru o Yuke was taken at The Manor Studio in the United Kingdom. Part of the album was recorded additionally at the studio in Britain, and some of the songs featured saxophone played by Mel Collins.

== Track listing ==
All songs written and composed by Miyuki Nakajima.

1. "Into the Night (夜を往け, Yoru wo Yuke)" – 5:37
2. "Futatsu no Honō (ふたつの炎)" – 5:30
3. "3-Pun'go ni Sutetemo Ii (3分後に捨ててもいい)" – 4:41
4. "Tomorrow (あした, Ashita)" [album mix] – 5:30
5. "Shin-Sonezaki Shinjū (新曾根崎心中)" – 6:33
6. "Kimi no Mukashi wo (君の昔を)" – 4:19
7. "Enrai (遠雷)" – 6:43
8. "Two of Us (ふたりは, Futari wa)" – 6:27
9. "Kita no Kuni no Narai (北の国の習い)" – 5:04
10. "with" – 5:39

== Personnel ==
- Jun Aoyama – drums
- Hideo Yamaki – drums
- Tōru Hasebe – drums
- Toshiaki Usui – acoustic guitar
- Chūei Yoshikawa – acoustic guitar, mandolin, mandola
- Tsuyoshi Kon – acoustic guitar, electric guitar
- Masaki Matsubara – electric guitar, gut guitar
- Takayuki Hijikata – electric guitar
- Yasuo Tomikura – bass guitar
- Hideki Matsubara – bass guitar
- Chiharu Mikuzuki – bass guitar, fretless bass, stickbass
- Yasuharu Nakanishi – keyboards
- Ryoichi Kuniyoshi – keyboards
- Nobuo Kurata – keyboards, computer programming
- Keishi Urata – computer programming
- Ichizo Seo – computer programming, keyboards, backup vocals
- Kazuyo Sugimoto – backup vocals
- Yuiko Tsubokura – backup vocals
- Mel Collins – saxophone
- Toshihiko Furumura – saxophone

== Production ==
- Producer and Arranger: Ichizo Seo
- Composer, Lyricist, Producer and Performer: Miyuki Nakajima
- Recording Engineer – Jun Amatatu, Takanobu Ichikawa, Chizuru Yamada, Katsuyoshi Yahagi, Kenji Matsunaga, Kengo Kato, Yoshiyuki Yokoyama, Calum Rees
- Mixer – Felix Kendall (at the Manor Studio, Oxford, UK)
- Mastering Engineer – Bunt Stafford Clark (at the Town House Studio, London)
- Photographer and Art Director: Jin Tamura
- Designer: Hirofumi Arai
- Costume: Kazumi Yamase
- Hair and Makeup – Harumi Kohno
- A&R: Yūzō Watanabe, Kazuhiro Nagaoka
- Disc Promotor: Yoshio Kan, Hiroshi Akao
- Music Coordinator – Takashi Kimura, Fumio Miyata
- Artist Management: Kohji Suzuki
- General Management: Takahiro Uno
- Management Desk: Atsuko Hayashi, Tomoko Takaya
- DAD – Genichi Kawakami
- Thank to the Manor Studio Staff

== Chart positions ==
Year	Chart	Position	Sales	RIAJ Certification
1990	Japanese Oricon Weekly Albums Chart (Top 100)	3	170,000+	Gold

== See also ==
- 1990 in Japanese music
