= New Moon ni Aimashō =

Single by Wink

from the album Crescent
- Language: Japanese
- English title: Meet the New Moon
- B-side: "Mizu no Seiza"
- Released: November 21, 1990
- Recorded: 1990
- Genre: J-pop; dance-pop
- Length: 4:24
- Label: Polystar
- Composer: Yuki Kadokura
- Lyricist: Neko Oikawa

Wink singles chronology
"Yoru ni Hagurete (Where Were You Last Night)" (1990)	"New Moon ni Aimashō" (1990)	"Kitto Atsui Kuchibiru (Remain)" (1991)

Music video
- "New Moon ni Aimashō" on YouTube

"New Moon ni Aimashō" (ニュー・ムーンに逢いましょう, Nyū Mūn ni Aimashō; lit. "Meet the New Moon") is the ninth single by Japanese idol duo Wink. Written by Neko Oikawa and Yuki Kadokura, the single was released on November 21, 1990, by Polystar Records.

== Background and release ==
"New Moon ni Aimashō" was used by Panasonic for their RQ-S45 headphone commercial. The B-side is "Mizu no Seiza", a Japanese-language cover of the Tricia Leigh Fisher song "Let an Angel".

"New Moon ni Aimashou" became Wink's second consecutive single to peak at No. 2 on the Oricon's weekly charts. It sold over 249,000 copies and was certified Gold by the RIAJ.

== Track listing ==
All lyrics are written by Neko Oikawa; all music is arranged by Satoshi Kadokura.

No.	Title	Music	Length
1.	"New Moon ni Aimashō" (ニュー・ムーンに逢いましょう, lit. 'Meet the New Moon')	Yuki Kadokura	4:24
2.	"Mizu no Seiza" (水の星座, lit. 'Water Constellation')	Rod Gamons; Angie Rubin; Shelley Speck	4:43

== Charts ==
Weekly charts

Chart (1990)	Peak position
Japanese Oricon Singles Chart	2

Year-end charts

Chart (1991)	Peak position
Japanese Oricon Singles Chart	55

== Certifications ==
Region	Certification	Certified units/sales
Japan (RIAJ)	Gold	200,000^{^}
^{^} Shipments figures based on certification alone.

== See also ==
- 1990 in Japanese music
