= Lady-Go-Round =

Single by B'z

from the album Break Through
- Released: February 21, 1990
- Genre: Pop rock; electronic rock
- Length: 9:19
- Label: BMG Japan
- Songwriters: Koshi Inaba; Tak Matsumoto
- Producer: Masao Nakashima

B'z singles chronology
"Kimi no Naka de Odoritai" (1989)	"Lady-Go-Round" (1990)	"Be There" (1990)

"Lady-Go-Round" is the third single by B'z, released on February 21, 1990, and the only single from their 1990 album, Break Through. It was the first B'z song to chart, peaking at number 39 on the Oricon Singles Chart, selling over 25,000 copies during its chart run.

The song also appears on the EP Wicked Beat as a heavily reworked "W-Style" version with both English and Japanese lyrics and different guitar solos by Tak Matsumoto.

== Track listing ==
1. "Lady-Go-Round"
2. "Love & Chain"

== See also ==
- 1990 in Japanese music
