= Risky (album) =

Studio album by B'z
- Released: November 7, 1990
- Recorded: 1990
- Genres: Pop rock; new wave
- Length: 47:37
- Label: BMG Victor/ZEZ
- Producer: Tak Matsumoto

B'z chronology
Break Through (1990)	Risky (1990)	In the Life (1991)

Singles from Risky
- 1. "Easy Come, Easy Go!" Released: October 3, 1990; 2. "Itoshii Hitoyo Good Night…" Released: October 24, 1990

Risky is the fourth studio album by the Japanese rock duo B'z. "Risky" sold 314,770 copies in its first week and 1,695,900 copies in total. It is the band's first studio album to break the million mark.

Risky was also the first of two collaborations with engineer Jason Corsaro, who has also worked with artists such as Duran Duran, The Power Station and Madonna.

The album spawned two singles, "Easy Come, Easy Go!" and "Itoshii Hitoyo Good Night…"

The album also produced the band's first (and, to date, only) official music video collection, Film Risky.

== Track listing ==
All lyrics are written by Koshi Inaba; all music is composed by Tak Matsumoto.

No.	Title	Length
1.	"Risky"	1:24
2.	"Gimme Your Love -不屈のLove Driver-" (Gimme Your Love -Persistent Love Driver-)	4:23
3.	"Hot Fashion -流行過多-" (Hot Fashion -Fashion Excess-)	4:11
4.	"Easy Come, Easy Go! -Risky Style-"	4:40
5.	"愛しい人よGood Night…" (Lovely One, Good Night…)	6:13
6.	"Holy Nightにくちづけを" (A Holy Night Kiss)	5:01
7.	"Vampire Woman"	4:58
8.	"確かなものは闇の中" (Certainly Something in the Dark)	4:18
9.	"Friday Midnight Blue"	4:25
10.	"It's Raining…"	4:58
Total length:		47:37

== Certifications ==
Region	Certification	Certified units/sales
Japan (RIAJ)	2× Million	2,000,000^{^}
^{^} Shipments figures based on certification alone.

== See also ==
- 1990 in Japanese music
