= Easy Come, Easy Go! =

Single by B'z

from the album Risky
- Released: October 3, 1990
- Genre: Pop rock
- Label: BMG Japan
- Songwriters: Koshi Inaba, Tak Matsumoto
- Producer: Tak Matsumoto

B'z singles chronology
"Taiyō no Komachi Angel" (1990)	"Easy Come, Easy Go!" (1990)	"Itoshii Hitoyo Good Night…" (1990)

"Easy Come, Easy Go!" is the sixth single by B'z, released on October 3, 1990. This song is one of B'z many number-one singles in Oricon chart, and also their first single to stay at number one more than two weeks. The single was re-released in 2003, and re-entered at #7. It sold over 471,000 copies according to Oricon.

The song was included in the band's video compilation Film Risky.

There are two versions of "Easy Come, Easy Go!":

- --The "Risky Style" version, found on the album Risky and used in the song's music video. This is a more aggressive mix, with the drums and synths pushed forward in the mix;
- --The single version of the song, which also appears on the compilation B'z The Best "Treasure", and in an instrumental version on the band's first TV Style album. This is a less aggressive, more radio-friendly mix. Both the drums and synths are dropped further back in the mix while the acoustic guitars are brought forward. In addition, synth brass stabs that precede the chorus that were less prominent in the "Risky Style" version are brought forward as well.

The song's music video was shot in New York City. The video's plot revolves around lead singer Koshi Inaba bicycling all over New York City and constantly running into an African-American woman who he worked out with at a dance studio. He eventually gets to dance with her again at the end of the video. There are also clips of Inaba and guitarist Matsumoto performing the song on the streets. She appears in all of the Film Risky videos shot in New York, but this is the only video in which she is prominent.

== Usage in media ==
- Miki (Camelia Diamond) Commercial Song (#1)

== Track listing ==
1. Easy Come, Easy Go!
2. Go! Nude! Go!

== Certifications ==
Region	Certification	Certified units/sales
Japan (RIAJ)	Platinum	400,000^{^}
^{^} Shipments figures based on certification alone.

== See also ==
- 1990 in Japanese music
