= 32nd Japan Record Awards =

1990 Japanese music awards ceremony

- Date: 31 December 1990
- Venue: Nippon Budokan, Tokyo
- Hosted by: Eiji Bandō, Akiko Wada

Television/radio coverage
- Network: TBS

The 32nd Annual Japan Record Awards took place at the Nippon Budokan in Chiyoda, Tokyo, 31 December 1990, starting at 6:30PM JST. The primary ceremonies were televised in Japan on TBS.

The audience rating was 12.5%.

== Award winners ==
=== Pops and Rock ===
- Japan Record Award:
  - Tetsuro Oda (composer/arranger), Momoko Sakura (Songwriter) B.B.Queens for "Odoru Pompokolin"
- Best Pops Vocalist:
  - Mariya Takeuchi
- Best Rock Vocalist:
  - Southern All Stars
- Best Pops New Artist:
  - Ninja
- Best Rock New Artist:
  - Tama
- Best Foreign Artist:
  - Madonna

=== Enka and Kayōkyoku ===
- Japan Record Award:
  - Takao Horiuchi for "Koiuta Tsuzuri"
- Best Vocalist:
  - Nobue Matsubara
- Best Kayōkyoku New Artist:
  - Yang Soo Kyung
- Best Enka New Artist:
  - Saori Hareyama

== See also ==
- 1990 in Japanese music
