= Taiyō no Komachi Angel =

Single by B'z
- Released: June 13, 1990
- Genre: Pop rock; new wave; Latin pop
- Length: 9:01
- Label: BMG Japan
- Songwriters: Koshi Inaba; Tak Matsumoto
- Producer: Masao Nakashima

B'z singles chronology
"Be There" (1990)	"Taiyō no Komachi Angel" (1990)	"Easy Come, Easy Go!" (1990)

"Taiyō no Komachi Angel" (太陽のKomachi Angel, "Sun's Komachi Angel") is the fifth single by B'z, released on June 13, 1990. The song became the band's first single to reach number one, selling over 463,000 copies and beginning a streak of every released single hitting and/or debuting at the number-one spot that remains unbroken to the present day. The single was re-released in 2003, and re-entered at #10.

== Usage in media ==
- Miki (Camelia Diamond) Commercial Song (#1)

== Track listing ==
1. "Taiyō no Komachi Angel" (太陽のKomachi Angel)
2. "Good-bye Holy Days"

== Certifications ==
Region	Certification	Certified units/sales
Japan (RIAJ)	2× Platinum	800,000^{^}
^{^} Shipments figures based on certification alone.

== See also ==
- 1990 in Japanese music
