= Jidai: Time Goes Around =

Studio album by Miyuki Nakajima
- Released: October 21, 1993
- Recorded: Burnish Stone, Z'd, ARC Garret, CapitoI Studios and A&M Recording Studios
- Genre: Folk rock
- Length: 62:58
- Label: Pony Canyon/AARD-VARK
- Producer: Ichizo Seo, Miyuki Nakajima

Miyuki Nakajima chronology
East Asia (1992)	Jidai: Time Goes Around (1993)	Love or Nothing (1994)

Jidai (時代), subtitled Time Goes Around, is the twenty-first studio album and fourth self-cover album by Japanese singer-songwriter Miyuki Nakajima, released in October 1993. Like previous releases such as Okaerinasai and Change (Oiro Naoshi), the album mainly consists of songs which she wrote for other singers.

It features a re-recording of her song "Jidai", used as the theme song for the 1970 Osaka Expo, and "Doukoku", originally written for Shizuka Kudo and used for the TV drama Ano Hi ni Kaeritai.

== Track listing ==
All songs written by Miyuki Nakajima (except where noted).

1. "Jidai (Time Goes Around)" – 5:35
  - New recording of a 1975 hit single
2. "Kaze no Sugata (風の姿)" – 5:31
  - Originally written for Yuri Nakae
3. "Rolling (ローリング, Rōringu)" – 5:00
  - New recording of a song originally appeared on her 1988 eponymous album
4. "Adokenai Hanashi (あどけない話)" – 4:47
  - Originally written for Hideko Yoshida
5. "Courage To Dream (夢見る勇気, Yumemiru Chikara)" – 4:00
  - Originally written for Izumi Yukimura
6. "Atashi Tokidoki Omouno (あたし時々おもうの)" – 8:00
  - New recording of an obscure composition initially released in 1972
7. "Sasurai no Uta (流浪の詩)" – 6:13
  - New recording of a song appeared on her second studio album released in 1976
8. "Ugetsu no Shisha (雨月の使者)" (Nakajima/Juro Kara) – 4:48
  - New recording of a theme song for the same titled TV-drama aired in 1987
9. "I Cried All Night (慟哭, Doukoku)" (Tsugutoshi Gotō/Nakajima) – 5:42
  - Originally written for Shizuka Kudo
10. "Lonely Face 1st (孤独の肖像1st, Kodoku no Shouzou 1st)" – 6:40
  - New recording of an unreleased material in the mid 1980s
11. "Juste une chanson (かもめの歌, Kamome no Uta)" – 6:42
  - Originally written for Patricia Kaas

== Personnel ==
- Shigeru Suzuki – electric guitar
- Tsuyoshi Kon – electric guitar
- Masaki Matsubara – acoustic guitar
- Toshiaki Usui – acoustic & dobro guitar
- Chuei Yoshikawa – banjo
- Hideki Wachi – mandolin, bouzouki and balalaika
- Tim Pierce – electric and acoustic Guitar
- Kenji Takamizu – bass guitar
- Yasuo Tomikura – bass guitar
- Bob Graub – bass guitar
- Elton Nagata – keyboards
- Bill Payne – piano
- John Van Tongren – keyboards, computer programming, B-3 Hammond
- Yasuharu Nakanishi – B-3 hammond
- Koichi Matsuda – harmonica
- Nobuo Kurata – keyboards, piano
- Motoya Hamaguchi – percussion, tambourine, congas, Bells
- Eiji Shimamura – drums, cymbals
- Hideo Yamaki – Drums
- Denny Fongheiser – Drums
- Toshihiko Furumura – alto and tenor sax
- Joe Sublett – Tenor Sax
- David Campbell – strings conductor
- Joel Derouin – strings concertmaster
- Suzie Katayama – string contractor
- Takashi Katoh, Joe Osawa – violin
- Yu Watanabe – viola
- Hiroto Kawamura – cello
- Julia Waters – backup vocals
- Maxine Waters – backup vocals
- Oren Waters – backup vocals
- EVE – backup vocals
- Yoshimi Hamada – backup vocals
- Jiroh Toi – backup vocals
- Tatsuhiko Mori – programming
- Nobuhiko Nakayama – programming
- Keishi Urata – programming
- Ichizo Seo – programming, backup vocals

== Production ==
- Producer and Arranger: Ichizo Seo
- Composer, Writer, Producer and Performer: Miyuki Nakajima
- Arranger:Nobuo Kurata, David Campbell
- Engineer and Mixer: Tad Gotoh, Joe Chiccarelli
- Engineer:Marc DeSisto, Kengo Katoh
- Mixer: Hiroshi Tokunaga, Tomotaka Takehara, Mike Baumagerther
- A&R: Yuzo Watanabe, Kohichi Suzuki
- Assistant: Takao Kido, Tomoko Yamashita, Masahiko Satoh, Aaron Conner, Bill Smith Mike, Junichi Hohrin
- Assistant for Producer: Tsuyoshi Itoh
- Artist Promotor: Yoshio Kan
- Disc Promotor: Shoko Aoki
- Music Coordinator – Takashi Kimura, Fumio Miyata, Tomoko Takaya, Ruriko Duer
- Photographer and Art Director: Jin Tamura
- Designer: Hirofumi Arai
- Costume: Kazumi Yamase
- Hair and Make-up: Noriko Izumisawa
- Artist Management: Kohji Suzuki
- Assistant: Maki Nishida
- Management Desk: Atsuko Hayashi
- General Management: Takahiro Uno
- Special Thanks to Kyu Sakamoto, Judy Ongg, Bunkamura

== Chart positions ==
Year	Chart	Position	Sales	Certification (RIAJ)
1993	Japanese Oricon Weekly Albums Chart (Top 100)	4 (CDDA)	270,000	Platinum
1993	Japanese Oricon Weekly Albums Chart (Top 100)	12 (APO-CD)	270,000	Platinum
