= Velvet (Wink album) =

Studio album by Wink
- Released: July 11, 1990
- Recorded: 1990
- Genres: J-pop; dance-pop
- Length: 45:18
- Language: Japanese
- Label: Polystar
- Producer: Haruo Mizuhashi

Wink chronology
Wink First Live Shining Star (1990)	Velvet (1990)	Wink Hot Singles (1990)

Singles from Velvet
- 1. "Sexy Music" Released: March 28, 1990

Velvet (ベルベット, Berubetto) is the fourth studio album by Japanese idol duo Wink, released by Polystar on July 11, 1990. It features the No. 1 single "Sexy Music", a Japanese-language cover of The Nolans' 1981 single. Also included in the album are covers of Carmin's "Dos Hombres", the Nolans' "I'm in the Mood for Dancing", Kool & the Gang's "Cherish", and Eddie Hodges' "I'm Gonna Knock on Your Door". Velvet was Wink's first album to feature Satoshi Kadokura as the duo's music arranger.

The album peaked at No. 4 on Oricon's albums chart and sold over 198,000 copies. It was also certified Gold by the RIAJ.

== Track listing ==
All lyrics are written by Neko Oikawa, except where indicated; all music is arranged by Satoshi Kadokura, except where indicated.

No.	Title	Lyrics	Music	Arrangement	Length
1.	"Sexy Music [Remix]"		Ben Findon; Mike Myers; Bob Puzey		5:03
2.	"Rainy Lonely Pavement"	Sayako Morimoto	Hitoshi Haba		3:49
3.	"Natsufuku no Juliet (Dos Hombres)" (Natsufuku no Jurietto ~Dos Hombres~ (夏服のジュリエット 〜Dos Hombres〜; "Juliet in Summer Clothes ~Dos Hombres~"))		Jamey Jaz; Ren Toppano; Gabriela Martinez		5:07
4.	"Unshakable"	Morimoto	Patrick DeRemer; Jan Buckingham		5:01
5.	"Ame ni Negai wo" ((雨に願いを; "Wishing for the Rain"))		Masaya Ozeki		4:17
6.	"Ginsei Club (I'm in Mood for Dancing)" ((銀星倶楽部 〜I'm In Mood For Dancing〜))	Morimoto	Findon; Myers; Puzey		4:19
7.	"Ano Natsu no Seagull (Cherish)" (Ano Natsu no Shīgaru ~Cherisshu~ (あの夏のシーガル 〜Cherish〜; "That Summer Seagull ~Cherish~"))		Robert Earl Bell; Ronald Nathan Bell; James L Bonnefond; George Melvin Brown; Claydes Charles Smith; James "J.T." Taylor; Curtis "Fitz" Williams		4:55
8.	"I'm Gonna Knock on Your Door"		Aaron Schroeder; Sid Wayne		4:06
9.	"Zeitaku na Kodoku" ((贅沢な孤独; "Luxury Loneliness"))	Morimoto	Keizo Nakanishi; Takao Konishi	Motoki Funayama	3:53
10.	"Tsukiyo no Shinjugai" ((月夜の真珠貝; "Moonlit Pearl Shell"))		Ozeki		4:48
Total length:					45:18

2018 bonus track
No.	Title	Music	Arrangement	Length
11.	"Ichiban Kanashii Bara" ((いちばん哀しい薔薇; "The Saddest Rose"))	Kisaburō Suzuki	Funayama	4:25

== Charts ==
Chart (1990)	Peak position
Japanese Albums (Oricon)	4

== Certification ==
Region	Certification	Certified units/sales
Japan (RIAJ)	Gold	200,000^{^}
^{^} Shipments figures based on certification alone.

== See also ==
- 1990 in Japanese music
