= Crescent (Wink album) =

Studio album by Wink
- Released: December 16, 1990
- Recorded: 1990
- Genres: J-pop; dance-pop
- Length: 47:35
- Language: Japanese
- Label: Polystar
- Producer: Haruo Mizuhashi

Wink chronology
| Wink Hot Singles (1990) | Crescent (1990) | Queen of Love (1991) |

Singles from Crescent
- 1. "Yoru ni Hagurete (Where Were You Last Night)" Released: July 4, 1990; 2. "New Moon ni Aimashou" Released: November 21, 1990

Crescent (クレセント, Kuresento) is the fifth studio album by Japanese idol duo Wink, released by Polystar on December 16, 1990. It features the singles "Yoru ni Hagurete (Where Were You Last Night)" (a cover of Ankie Bagger's 1989 song) and "New Moon ni Aimashou". Also included in the album are Japanese-language covers of Annica Burman's "I Can't Deny a Broken Heart", Kiss' "I Was Made for Lovin' You", Harold Payne's "We'll Be Together Someday", and The Cowsills' "The Rain, the Park & Other Things".

The album peaked at No. 10 on Oricon's albums chart and sold over 164,000 copies.

== Track listing ==
All lyrics are written by Neko Oikawa, except where indicated; all music is arranged by Satoshi Kadokura.

| No. | Title | Lyrics | Music | Length |
|---|---|---|---|---|
| 1. | "New Moon ni Aimashou [Remix]" (Nyū Mūn ni Aimashō (ニュー・ムーンに逢いましょう; "Meet the New Moon")) | | Yuki Kadokura | 5:18 |
| 2. | "Kanashii Kareha (I Can't Deny a Broken Heart)" ((悲しい枯葉 〜I Can't Deny a Broken Heart〜; "Sad Dead Leaves ~I Can't Deny a Broken Heart~")) | Sayako Morimoto | Karin Ljung | 3:53 |
| 3. | "Fuyu no Shinkirō" ((冬の蜃気楼; "Mirage in Winter")) | | Masaya Ozeki | 4:53 |
| 4. | "Warui Yume (I Was Made for Loving You)" ((悪い夢 〜I Was Made for Loving You〜; "A Bad Dream ~I Was Made for Loving You~")) | | Paul Stanley; Vini Poncia; Desmond Child | 4:29 |
| 5. | "Mafuyu no Bara (Note: Cover of Harold Payne's "We'll Be Together Someday".)" ((真冬の薔薇; "Midwinter Rose")) | | Bunny Hull; Harold Payne | 4:17 |
| 6. | "Ame ni Kieta Hatsukoi (The Rain, the Park and Other Things)" ((雨に消えた初恋 〜The Rain, The Park and Other Things〜; "The First Love That Disappeared in the Rain ~The Rain, the Park and Other Things~")) | Ayuko Ishikawa | Artie Kornfeld; Steve Duboff | 4:20 |
| 7. | "Miracle Knight" | | Yasuhiro Kido | 4:40 |
| 8. | "All Night Long" | Masami Tozawa | Ozeki | 5:17 |
| 9. | "Yoru ni Hagurete (Where Were You Last Night) [Remix]" ((夜にはぐれて 〜Where Were You Last Night〜)) | | Norell Oson Bard | 4:39 |
| 10. | "Variation (Sayonara no Hensōkyoku)" ((Variation 〜さよならの変奏曲〜; "Variation ~Goodbye Variation~")) | Morimoto | Fuyumi Iwasawa | 4:48 |
| Total length: | | | | 47:35 |

2018 bonus tracks
| No. | Title | Music | Length |
|---|---|---|---|
| 11. | "Mizu no Seiza (Note: Cover of Tricia Leigh Fisher's "Let an Angel".)" ((水の星座; "Water Constellation")) | Rod Gamons; Angie Rubin; Shelley Speck | 4:45 |
| 12. | "Omoide made Soba ni Ite (Welcome to the Edge)" ((想い出までそばにいて (Welcome To The Edge); "I'll Stay by Your Side Until You Remember (Welcome to the Edge)")) | Billie Hughes; Roxanne Seeman; Dominic Messinger | 5:05 |
| Total length: | | | 9:51 |

== Charts ==
| Chart (1990) | Peak position |
|---|---|
| Japanese Albums (Oricon) | 10 |

== See also ==
- 1990 in Japanese music
