= 31st Japan Record Awards =

1989 Japanese music awards ceremony

- Date: 31 December 1989
- Venue: Nippon Budokan, Tokyo
- Hosted by: Eiji Bandō, Eriko Kusuta

Television/radio coverage
- Network: TBS

The 31st Annual Japan Record Awards took place at the Nippon Budokan in Chiyoda, Tokyo, 31 December 1989, starting at 7:00PM JST. The primary ceremonies were televised in Japan on TBS.

The audience rating was 14%.

== Award winners ==
- Japan Record Award:
  - Wink for "Samishii Nettaigyo"
- Best Vocalist:
  - Sayuri Ishikawa
- Best New Artist:
  - Marcia
- Best Album:
  - Anri for "Circuit of Rainbow"
- Special Honor Singer Prize:
  - Hibari Misora
- Lyrics Award
  - Osamu Yoshioka for the song "Kōshoku Ichidai Onna" (好色一代女) (sung by Akari Uchida)

== See also ==
- 1989 in Japanese music
