= Be There (B'z song) =

Single by B'z
- Released: May 25, 1990
- Genre: Pop rock; new wave
- Length: 8:56
- Label: BMG Japan
- Songwriters: Koshi Inaba; Tak Matsumoto
- Producer: Masao Nakashima

B'z singles chronology
"Lady-Go-Round" (1990)	"Be There" (1990)	"Taiyō no Komachi Angel" (1990)

"Be There" is the fourth single by B'z, released on May 25, 1990. The song initially peaked at number 7 on the Oricon Singles Chart in 1990, and later peaked at number 3 in 2003 during its re-release. It was the band's first song recorded specifically as a single not connected with any album. The song appears on 1998's Best "Pleasure" and 2008's Best "Ultra" Pleasure compilations. To date, it has sold over 348,000 copies.

== Track listing ==
1. "Be There"
2. "Hoshi Furu Yoru ni Sawagō" (星降る夜に騒ごう)

== Certifications ==
Region	Certification	Certified units/sales
Japan (RIAJ)	Platinum	400,000^{^}
^{^} Shipments figures based on certification alone.

== See also ==
- 1990 in Japanese music
