= Break Through (album) =

Studio album by B'z
- Released: February 21, 1990
- Recorded: 1990
- Studios: Studio Birdman (Gray & Brown Room)
- Genres: Pop rock; new wave; hip-hop
- Length: 48:18
- Languages: Japanese, English
- Label: Air
- Producer: Masao Nakajima

B'z chronology
Off the Lock (1989)	Break Through (1990)	Risky (1990)

Singles from Break Through
- 1. "Lady-Go-Round" Released: February 21, 1990

Break Through is the third studio album by the Japanese rock duo B'z. The album debuted at number 3 on the Oricon Weekly Albums Chart, being their last studio album not to reach number 1. It sold 41,700 copies in its first week and sold a total of 724,640 copies during its chart run. It was eventually certified Million by the RIAJ in January 1994.

Both Break Through and its follow-up, Risky, are considered the band's most synth-heavy albums. These albums also mark the only time that two albums from the band were released in the same year.

"Lady-Go-Round" was the only single released from the album.

== Style ==
Some of the songs on the album, most notably "B.U.M" and "Hey Brother", incorporate elements of hip-hop and rap alongside the pop rock sound of their previous albums, styles which the band would seldom, if ever, use again. As for the lyrics, vocalist Koshi Inaba stated that, in order to develop his own lyrical style, he incorporated language and tones that normally wouldn't fit rock music.

== Reception ==
CDJournal described the sound of the album as "a danceable one that makes full use of digital beats", while also praising the band for "inject[ing] their own pop sensibility into it, creating an emotional presence."

== Track listing ==
All lyrics are written by Koshi Inaba; all music is composed by Tak Matsumoto.

No.	Title	Length
1.	"Lady-Go-Round"	4:22
2.	"B.U.M"	1:25
3.	"Break Through"	4:25
4.	"Boys In Town"	4:39
5.	"Guitarは泣いている" (The Guitar is Crying)	6:32
6.	"Love & Chain"	4:56
7.	"となりでねむらせて" (Sleeping Next to You)	4:12
8.	"Hey Brother"	3:55
9.	"今では…今なら…今も…" (Right Now… If Now… And Now…)	5:18
10.	"Save Me!?"	3:27
11.	"Stardust Train"	5:03
Total length:		48:18

== Personnel ==
Credits are adapted from the liner notes.

B'z

- Koshi Inaba – vocals
- Tak Matsumoto – guitars, backing vocals

Additional Musicians

- Jun Aoyama – drums on tracks 4–5, 9, 11
- Takanobu Masuda – keyboard on "Stardust Train"
- Yuiko Tsubokura – backing vocals on "Lady-Go-Round" and "Love & Chain"
- Kaoru Abe – backing vocals
- Masao Akashi – backing vocals
- Yoko Hiromoto – backing vocals

Production

- Masao Akashi – production, arrangement
- Masayuki Nomura – mixing, recording engineer
- Masahiro Shimada – recording engineer
- Takayuki Ichikawa – recording, assistant engineer
- Machiko Suzue – mastering engineer
- Yasuo Sasaki – assistant engineer

== Charts ==
=== Weekly charts ===
Chart (1990–2021)	Peak position
Japanese Albums (Oricon)	3
Top Download Albums (Billboard Japan)	55

=== Year-end charts ===
Chart (1990)	Position
Japanese Albums (Oricon)	49

Chart (1991)	Position
Japanese Albums (Oricon)	58

== Certifications ==
Region	Certification	Certified units/sales
Japan (RIAJ)	Million	1,000,000^{^}
^{^} Shipments figures based on certification alone.

== See also ==
- 1990 in Japanese music
