= Off the Lock =

Studio album by B'z
- Released: May 21, 1989
- Recorded: 1989
- Studio: Studio Birdman (Brown & Gray Room)
- Genre: Pop rock; new wave
- Length: 41:59
- Label: Air
- Producer: Masao Nakajima

B'z chronology
B'z (1988)	Off the Lock (1989)	Break Through (1990)

Singles from Off the Lock
- 1. "Kimi no Naka de Odoritai" Released: May 21, 1989

Off The Lock is the second studio album by the Japanese rock duo B'z, released on May 21, 1989. It was the second album they released for BMG Victor's Air Records imprint.

The band's first-ever "Live-Gym" tour was in support of this album, and despite them being relatively new, tickets were sold out, a taste of what was to come.

The album peaked at number 33 on the Oricon Albums Chart and sold 4,590 copies in its first week, eventually selling 604,700 copies throughout its chart run. It was later certified Million by the RIAJ in August 1994.

== Writing ==
In an interview, vocalist Koshi Inaba expressed struggles he had while writing the lyrics, saying, "I was very impatient with the situation where the songs had already been written, but the lyrics I was in charge of were not ready at all, and it was depressing to think about the lyrics all the time." He also said, "Even though I struggled to write lyrics, I was criticized by others, so many times I wanted to give up and run away in the middle of writing the lyrics."

== Track listing ==
All lyrics are written by Koshi Inaba; all music is composed by Tak Matsumoto.

No.	Title	Length
1.	"君の中で踊りたい" (I Wanna Dance Inside You)	3:45
2.	"Hurry Up!"	3:49
3.	"Never Let You Go"	5:41
4.	"Safety Love"	4:11
5.	"Guitar Kids Rhapsody"	4:44
6.	"夜にふられても" (Even If You Break Up With Me Tonight)	3:56
7.	"Loving All Night"	5:22
8.	"Oh! Girl"	4:11
9.	"Rosy"	4:57
10.	"Off The Lock" (Instrumental)	1:21
Total length:		41:59

== Personnel ==
Credits are adapted from the liner notes.

B'z

- Koshi Inaba – vocals
- Tak Matsumoto – guitars, backing vocals

Additional Musicians

- Jun Aoyama – drums on tracks 2, 5–6, 8
- Nobuo Eguchi – drums on tracks 1, 3, 9
- Ikkies – backing vocals
- Masao Akashi – backing vocals
- Nobumitsu "Kyuso" Asai – backing vocals
- Ryoichi "Linda" Terashima – backing vocals
- "Thunder Bird" Tsuruta – backing vocals

Production

- Masao Akashi – production, programming, arrangement
- Masayuki Nomura – mixing, recording engineer
- Masayuki Oshima – assistant engineer
- Yasuo Sasaki – assistant engineer

== Charts ==
=== Weekly charts ===
Chart (1989)	Peak position
Japanese Albums (Oricon)	33

=== Year-end charts ===
Chart (1991)	Position
Japanese Albums (Oricon)	65

Chart (1992)	Position
Japanese Albums (Oricon)	90

== Certifications ==
Region	Certification	Certified units/sales
Japan (RIAJ)	Million	1,000,000^{^}
^{^} Shipments figures based on certification alone.

== See also ==
- 1989 in Japanese music
