= Miyagi Prefectural Auditorium =

Multi-purpose hall in Sendai, Japan

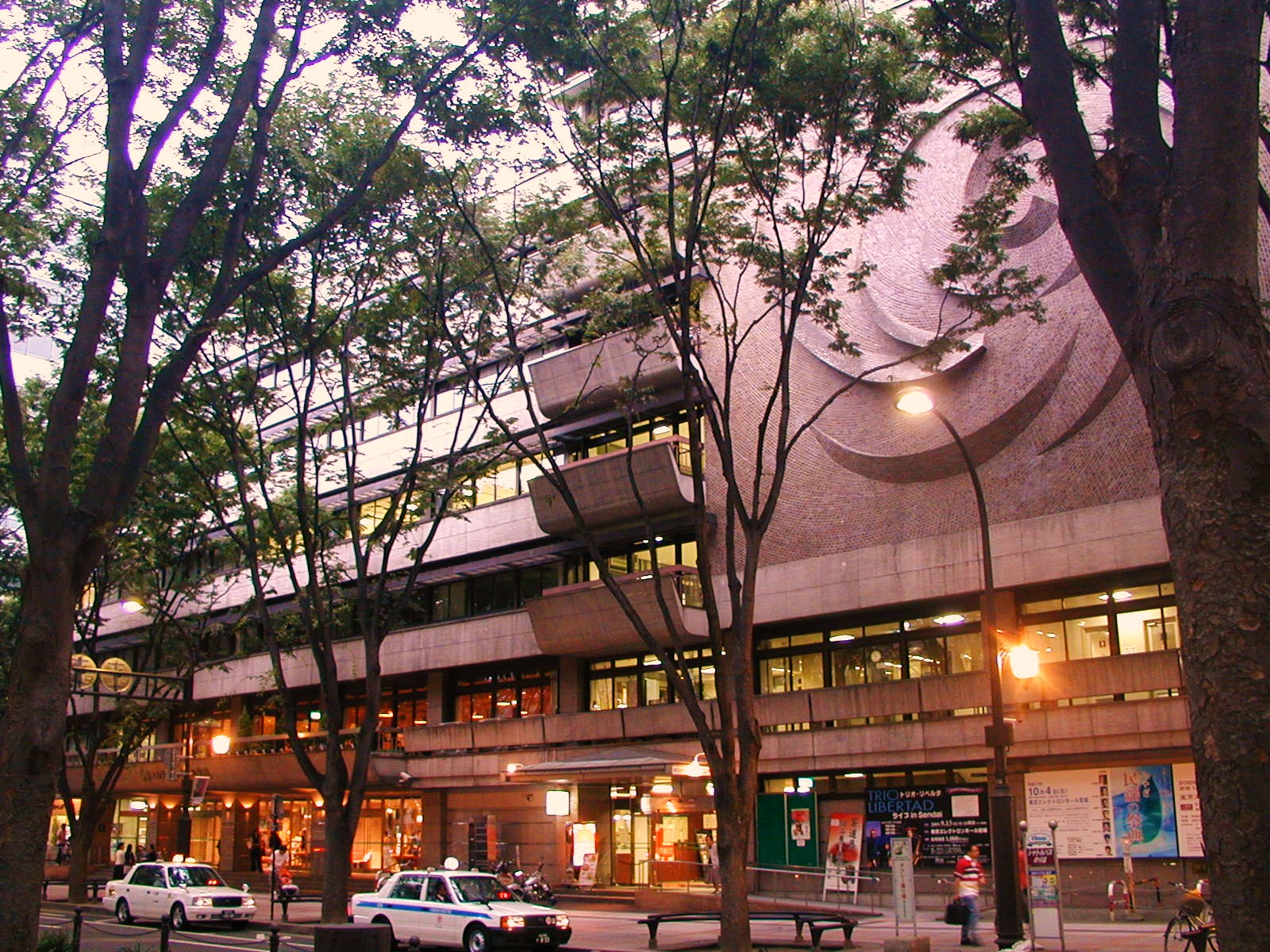
Miyagi Prefectural Auditorium

Miyagi Prefectural Auditorium (宮城県民会館) is a 1,590-seat multi-purpose hall located in Sendai, Japan. It opened in 1964 and has hosted artists such as Cheap Trick, Whitesnake and Mötley Crüe. After the sale of the naming rights, Tokyo Electron Hall Miyagi became, on April 1, 2008, the preferred nickname for Miyagi Prefectural Auditorium.
