= 20 Giant Hits =

Studio album by The Nolan Sisters
- Released: 6 July 1978
- Genre: Pop, MOR
- Label: Target Records
- Producer: Roger Greenaway

The Nolan Sisters chronology
The Nolan Sisters (1975)	20 Giant Hits (1978)	Nolan Sisters (1979)

Singles from 20 Giant Hits
- 1. "Don't It Make My Brown Eyes Blue" Released: 23 June 1978

20 Giant Hits is a 1978 album by The Nolan Sisters, their first album as a mainstream release. It was also their first chart success, peaking at No.3 in the UK albums chart. The album was produced by Roger Greenaway.

== Background ==
The Nolan Sisters had been regularly appearing on television since 1974 singing mostly cover versions of popular songs. They had also released two studio albums, but neither with any mainstream distribution. They secured a recording contract with Target Records in 1975, releasing six singles over the next two years, but all without chart success.

In 1978, the label decided to give the group one last major push by recording an album of cover versions that would be TV advertised. Preceded by the single release "Don't It Make My Brown Eyes Blue", the album was released in July 1978 and quickly entered the charts at No.27. The label's three year investment in the group paid off as the album rose the charts rapidly, peaking at No.3 for three consecutive weeks. It remained on the charts for 12 weeks and was certified gold for sales of over 100,000 in the UK on 10 August 1978. This was the only chart success with the group experienced by sister Denise, who left soon after to embark on a solo career.

Following this, the group went on to greater success over the next few years by releasing a string of hit singles and albums worldwide, most notably in the UK and Japan, where this album also charted at No.38.

This album was released on compact disc in January 2010 by Cherry Red Records as 20 Giant Hits Plus.... It included a bonus disc containing all their earlier singles and B-sides, totalling 13 extra tracks.

== Track listing ==
Side One
No.	Title	Writer(s)	Original Artist, Year	Length
1.	"Sailing"	The Sutherland Brothers	Rod Stewart, 1975	4:06
2.	"Don't It Make My Brown Eyes Blue"	Richard Leigh	Crystal Gayle, 1977	2:30
3.	"Mull of Kintyre"	Paul McCartney / Denny Laine	Wings, 1977	4:16
4.	"Don't Give Up on Us"	Tony Macaulay	David Soul, 1976	3:35
5.	"The Way We Were"	Alan and Marilyn Bergman / Marvin Hamlisch	Barbra Streisand, 1973	2:46
6.	"Isn't She Lovely"	Stevie Wonder	Stevie Wonder, 1976	3:29
7.	"You Make Me Feel Brand New"	Thom Bell / Linda Creed	The Stylistics, 1974	4:34
8.	"Chanson D'Amour"	Wayne Shanklin	The Manhattan Transfer, 1977	2:35
9.	"God Only Knows"	Brian Wilson / Tony Asher	The Beach Boys, 1966	2:38
10.	"Money, Money, Money"	Benny Andersson / Björn Ulvaeus	ABBA, 1976	3:15

Side Two
No.	Title	Writer(s)	Original Artist, Year	Length
1.	"Bridge over Troubled Water"	Paul Simon	Simon and Garfunkel, 1970	4:36
2.	"Without You"	Pete Ham / Tom Evans	Harry Nilsson, 1971	3:03
3.	"Song Sung Blue"	Neil Diamond	Neil Diamond, 1972	3:05
4.	"Your Song"	Elton John / Bernie Taupin	Elton John, 1970	4:27
5.	"He"	Charles Aznavour / Herbert Kretzmer	Charles Aznavour, 1974	2:31
6.	"I'd Like to Teach the World to Sing"	Roger Cook / Roger Greenaway / Bill Backer / Billy Davis	The New Seekers, 1971	2:47
7.	"When a Child Is Born"	Ciro Dammicco / Fred Jay	Johnny Mathis, 1976	3:26
8.	"Save Your Kisses for Me"	Tony Hiller / Lee Sheriden / Martin Lee	Brotherhood of Man, 1976	2:54
9.	"(I Wanna) Make It with You"	David Gates	Bread, 1970	3:14
10.	"Reach Out I'll Be There"	Holland–Dozier–Holland	Four Tops, 1966	2:58

== Personnel ==
- The Nolan Sisters - Vocals
- Roger Greenaway - Producer
- Gerry Butler - Arranger, Conductor, Synths
- Len Hunter - Arranger, Conductor
- Bill Price - Engineer
- Gary Edwards - Engineer
- Brian Odgers - Bass
- Brian Morgan - Drums
- Paul Keogh - Guitar
- Ritchie Hitchcock - Guitar
- Mike Moran - Keyboards
- Frank Ricotti - Percussion
- Tony Carr - Percussion

== Charts ==
Weekly chart performance for 20 Giant Hits
Chart (1978/1981)	Peak position
UK Albums (OCC)	3
Japan	38
