= Altogether (TV program) =

- Presented by: Ken Maslowsky
- Country of origin: Canada
- Original language: English
- No. of seasons: 1

Production
- Producer: Dale Nelson
- Running time: 30 minutes

Original release
- Network: CBC Television
- Release: 29 July – 19 August 1975

Altogether is a Canadian musical variety show that aired on CBC Television in 1975.

== Premise ==
This musical variety show was hosted by Ken Maslowsky, a vocalist who performed on the show with fellow-singer Iona Iliant. Bob McMullin, who previously worked on CBC's Let's Go, was the program's musical director. Miriam Bronstein, the Chai Folk Ensemble, Harvey Chochinov, Scott Walker and Sara Somner were among the show's guests.

== Production ==
Altogether was produced by Dale Nelson in Winnipeg on location at the Manitoba Theatre Club.

== Scheduling ==
The program aired on Tuesdays at 9:30 p.m. (Eastern) in July and August 1975.
