= Princess Princess =

Princess Princess may refer to:

- Princess Princess (band), Japanese rock band
- Princess Princess (manga), anime and manga series
- Princess-Princess, a character from the webcomic Sluggy Freelance
