= East Asia (album) =

Studio album by Miyuki Nakajima
- Released: October 7, 1992
- Recorded: Burnish Stone, Z'd, Sound Valley, ARC Garret, Sound Inn, Vincent, Jive, Epicurus & Westside Studio(Tokyo); Capitol Studio(Los Angeles)
- Genre: Folk rock
- Length: 53:05
- Label: Pony Canyon/AARD-VARK, Yamaha Music Communications
- Producer: Ichizo Seo, Miyuki Nakajima

Miyuki Nakajima chronology
Utadeshika Ienai (1991)	East Asia (1992)	Jidai: Time Goes Around (1993)

East Asia is the 20th studio album recorded by Japanese singer-songwriter Miyuki Nakajima, released in October 1992.

The album features "Shallow Sleep (Asai Nemuri)", a hit single released in July 1992. Nakajima wrote the song as a theme for Shin'ai Naru Mono e, a television drama that she made guest appearance on as a doctor. Shin'ai Naru Mono e's theme song peaked at No. 2 on the Japan's Oricon chart in the summer of 1992, and thus became her first single. This song has sold more than a million copies.

Prior to the release of the album Shin'ai Naru Mono e, the songs "Two Boats" and "Haginohara" were already performed on Yakai, which are experimental theaters Nakajima has performed annually since 1989.

"Thread (Ito)" is a love song Nakajima dedicated to Zenji Nakayama, a later leader of Tenrikyo who got married at that time. In 1998, it was featured on the television drama Seija no Koushin and was also released as a double A-Side single with "Another Name for Life". This song has become well known through a cover version recorded by the Bank Band, a project which Kazutoshi Sakurai and Takeshi Kobayashi launched for a charity. Their interpretation, featuring Sakurai's vocals, was included on their 2004 Soushi Souai album.

In December 1992, East Asia won the 34th Japan Record Awards for 10 Excellent Albums, which is a prize that honors ten exceptional studio albums.

Nakajima's song "Thread" (Japanese: 糸, Hepburn: Ito) is the inspiration of the 2020 film Threads: Our Tapestry of Love. Regarding the film adaptation, Nakajima commented: "Every time I hear different people sing the song I'm amazed at how it takes on different colors. I'm looking forward to seeing a new version of 'Tapestry' through this film."

== Track listing ==
All songs written and composed by Miyuki Nakajima, arranged by Ichizo Seo (except "East Asia" co-arranged by David Campbell)

1. "East Asia" – 6:48
2. "Dangerous Love (やばい恋, Yabai Koi)" – 4:39
3. "Shallow Sleep (浅い眠り, Asai Nemuri)" – 5:21
4. "Clover Field (萩野原, Haginohara)" – 6:35
5. "Birth (誕生, Tanjou)" – 6:49
6. "Not Here, But Somewhere (此処じゃない何処かへ, Koko ja nai Dokoka e)" – 4:49
7. "I'm Not Your Little Sister (妹じゃあるまいし, Imouto ja Arumaishi)" – 4:39
8. "Two Boats (二隻の舟, Nisou no Fune)" – 8:12
9. "Thread (糸, Ito)" – 5:07

== Personnel ==
- Miyuki Nakajima – lead and backing vocals
- Hideo Yamaki – drums
- Eiji Shimamura – drums
- Jun Aoyama – drums programming
- Kenji Takamizu – electric bass
- Yasuo Tomikura – electric bass
- Chiharu Mikuzuki – electric bass
- Tsuyoshi Kon – electric guitar, pedal steel guitar
- Takayuki Hijikata – electric guitar
- Shigeru Suzuki – electric guitar
- Chuei Yoshikawa – acoustic guitar
- Elton Nagata – acoustic piano, keyboards
- Yasuharu Nakanishi – acoustic piano, keyboards
- Nobuo Kurata – acoustic piano, keyboards, synth bass
- Nobu Saito – percussion
- Toshihiko Furumura – alto sax
- Joe's Group – strings
- Neko Saito Group – strings
- Syd Page Group – strings
- Keishi Urata – computer programming
- Nobuhiko Nakayama – computer programming
- Tatsuhiko Mori – computer programming
- Ichizo Seo – computer programming, backing vocals
- Yuiko Tsubokura – backing vocals, featuring vocals on "Two Boats"
- Kazuyo Sugimoto – backing vocals, featuring vocals on "Two Boats"
- Keiko Wada – backing vocals
- Yoko Yamauchi – backing vocals
- Raven Kane – backing vocals
- Julia Waters – backing vocals
- Maxine Waters – backing vocals
- Akiya – backing vocals

== Production ==
- Recording engineer: Tad Goto
- Additional engineers: Takanobu Ichikawa, Ray Blair
- Assiatant engineers: Yutaka Uematsu, Yoshiyuki Yokoyama, Hajime Nagai, Masataka Itoh, Takamasa Kido, Naomi Matsuo, Nobuhiko Nakayama, Tomotaka Takehara, Masashi Kudo, Shouji Sekine, Kenji Nakamura, Jim Gillens
- Mixing engineers: Tad Goto, Joe Chiccarelli
- Assistants for the mixing engineer: Tomotaka Takehara, Jamie Seyberth
- Music coordinators: Koji Kimura, Fumio Miyata, Tomoko Takaya, Ruriko Duer
- Art direction and photographer: Jin Tamura
- Cover designer: Hirofumi Arai
- Illustrator: Shigeko Kashima
- Hair and make-up: Noriko Izumisawa
- Artist management: Kouji Suzuki
- Assistant: Maki Nishida
- Management desk: Atsuko Hayashi
- General management: Takahiro Uno
- Promoter: Tadayoshi Okamoto, Shoko Aoki. Narihiko Yoshida
- Artists and repertoire: Yuzo Watanabe, Koichi Suzuki
- Assistant for the record producer: Tsuyoshi Ito
- Promoter for the recording artist: Yoshio Kan
- Dad: Genichi Kawakami

Mastering at Future Disc Systems in Los Angeles, by Tom Baker

== Chart positions ==
=== Album ===
Year	Chart	Position	Weeks	Sales	Certification (RIAJ)
1992	Japanese Oricon Weekly Albums Chart (Top 100)	2(CDDA)	15	357,000+	Platinum
1992	Japanese Oricon Weekly Albums Chart (Top 100)	8 (APO-CD)	3	357,000+	Platinum

=== Singles ===
Year	Single	Chart	Position	Weeks	Sales	RIAJ Certification
1992	"Birth" (double A-Side with "Maybe")	Japanese Oricon Weekly (top 100)	13	7	69,000	—
1992	"Shallow Sleep"	Japanese Oricon Weekly (top 100)	2	24	1,050,000	4× Platinum
1998	"Tapestry" (double A-Side with "Another Name for Life")	Japanese Oricon Weekly (top 100)	12	11	159,000	Gold

== Awards ==
Japan Record Awards
Year	Title	Category
1992 (34th)	East Asia	10 Excellent Albums

== Release history ==
Country	Date	Label	Format	Catalog number
Japan	October 7, 1992	Pony Canyon	CD	PCCA-00397
Japan	October 7, 1992	Pony Canyon	APO-CD	PCCA-00398
Japan	October 7, 1992	Pony Canyon	Audio cassette	PCTA-00146
Japan	May 23, 2001	Yamaha Music Communications	CD	YCCW-00023
Japan	November 5, 2008	Yamaha Music Communications	CD	YCCW-10072
