= Portrait (The Nolans album) =

Studio album by The Nolans
- Released: 19 March 1982
- Recorded: 1981–1982
- Genre: Pop
- Length: 51:05
- Label: Epic
- Producer: Ben Findon; Nicky Graham; Robin Smith

The Nolans chronology
Making Waves (1980)	Portrait (1982)	Altogether (1982)

Portrait is the sixth studio album by pop group The Nolans. It featured the UK top 20 singles "Chemistry" and "Don't Love Me Too Hard" and reached No.7 in the album charts. It was released earlier as Don't Love Me Too Hard in Japan with a slightly different track-listing, where it became one of the first 50 albums to be released on Compact disc. This would mark the last album to feature Linda Nolan following her departure that same year, she would later return to the group in 2009 in what would be the groups final Tour and Album.

== Background ==
By early 1982, The Nolans had had a run of success in the UK which included three UK top 20 albums and seven top 20 singles as well as achieving major success in Japan. Many of the tracks for this album had been recorded in 1981, but their touring schedule was preventing them from finishing it. With just one day before the deadline, the record company urged the group to work through the night to complete vocals for the remaining tracks. With a cheque for £25,000 to each of them, they did so and Portrait was released in March 1982. Featuring the top 20 hits "Chemistry" and "Don't Love Me Too Hard", the album itself was a success also by reaching No.7 in the album charts.

This, however, signalled the end of their peak, as a third single, "Crashing Down" proved to be aptly titled. The song not only became their first to fail to enter the top 20 this decade, but failed to make the charts at all. Somewhat curiously (and uniquely) it featured on the 'Bubbling Under' section of the chart for five consecutive weeks, without ever entering the top 75. Portrait finished as one of the top 100 selling albums of 1982 in the UK and was certified gold by the BPI.

The album, like its predecessor, was produced by Ben Findon and Nicky Graham separately. Both producers were now giving the songs a heavy disco sound such as "Don't Let it Go By" (by Findon) and "Chemistry" (by Graham). For this album, a third producer was added, Robin Smith, who was Coleen's boyfriend at the time. Two of the songs were co-written by member and lead-singer Bernie Nolan ("Are You Thinking of Me" and "Every Little Thing"), while closing track "Amy" was written for (former member) Anne's daughter, to whom the album was also dedicated. The album was a hit also in their biggest market, Japan, where it had been released as Don't Love Me Too Hard some months prior to the UK. A fourth single was released there also; a cover of "How Do I Survive" (originally by the Bliss Band and made famous by Amy Holland). The album was significant in that it became one of the first 50 pop albums ever to be released on Compact disc, when it was released on the format in Japan in October 1982.

The album was later re-released on CD with bonus tracks in September 2010 by Cherry Red Records.

== Track listing ==
Side one
No.	Title	Writer(s)	Producer(s)	Length
1.	"Don't Love Me Too Hard"	Ben Findon; Mike Myers; Robert Puzey	Findon	3:43
2.	"Chemistry"	Nicky Graham; Robin Smith	Graham	3:32
3.	"Don't Let It Go By"	Findon; Myers	Findon	3:43
4.	"I'm Never Gonna Let You Break My Heart Again"	Ken Gold; Michael Denne	Graham	3:58
5.	"A Simple Case of Loving You"	Barry Blue; Graham; Smith	Graham; Smith	3:46
6.	"Crashing Down"	Findon; Myers; Puzey	Findon	3:24
7.	"Are You Thinking of Me"	Smith; Bernie Nolan	Graham	4:19

Side two
No.	Title	Writer(s)	Producer(s)	Length
1.	"How Do I Survive"	Paul Bliss	Graham	4:00
2.	"If It Takes Me All Night"	Mick Leeson; Bliss	Graham	3:15
3.	"Every Home Should Have One"	Dominic Bugatti; Frank Musker	Graham	3:38
4.	"Every Little Thing"	Smith; B. Nolan	Graham; Smith	4:33
5.	"Take It Through the Night"	Smith	Graham	3:46
6.	"God Knows"	Allee Willis; Franne Golde; Peter Noone	Graham	3:39
7.	"Amy"	Smith; Graham	Smith	1:49

2010 reissue bonus tracks
No.	Title	Writer(s)	Producer(s)	Length
15.	"Dragonfly"	Tim Friese-Greene; Stevie Lange	Friese-Greene	3:37
16.	"Dressed to Kill"	Smith; Bradley James; Stewart James	Smith	3:55
17.	"It Could Have Been Your Love"	Coleen Nolan; Smith	Smith	4:09

== Chart performance ==
Release date	Single title	UK Chart position
July 1981	"Chemistry"	15
February 1982	"Don't Love Me Too Hard"	14
May 1982	"Crashing Down"	-
Release date	Album title	UK Chart position
March 1982	Portrait	7
Release date	Album title	Australian Chart position
April 1982	Portrait	54
