= Kimi no Naka de Odoritai =

Single by B'z

from the album Off the Lock
- Released: May 21, 1989
- Genre: Pop rock; electronic rock
- Length: 7:56
- Label: BMG Japan
- Songwriters: Koshi Inaba; Tak Matsumoto
- Producer: Masao Nakashima

B'z singles chronology
"Dakara Sono Te o Hanashite" (1988)	"Kimi no Naka de Odoritai" (1989)	"Lady-Go-Round" (1990)

"Kimi no Naka de Odoritai" (君の中で踊りたい; lit. "I Wanna Dance Inside You") is the second single by B'z, released on May 21, 1989. The single did not chart on the Oricon Singles Chart and has since been played live very few times. It is the first song by the band to have a tie-in, being featured as the ending theme for the TBS TV drama Haimisu de Warukatta ne!

The song has since appeared on multiple compilations and an English version titled "I Wanna Dance Wicked Beat Style" was released on the EP Wicked Beat.

== Track listing ==
All lyrics are written by Koshi Inaba; all music is composed by Tak Matsumoto.

No.	Title	Length
1.	"Kimi no Naka de Odoritai (君の中で踊りたい, I Wanna Dance Inside You)"	3:45
2.	"Safety Love"	4:11
Total length:		7:56

== See also ==
- 1989 in Japanese music
