= One Night in Heaven (Mayonaka no Angel) =

Single by Wink

from the album Twin Memories
- Language: Japanese
- English title: One Night in Heaven (Midnight Angel)
- B-side: "Cat-Walk Dancing"
- Released: November 1, 1989
- Recorded: 1989
- Genre: J-pop; dance-pop
- Length: 4:07
- Label: Polystar
- Composers: Steve Lironi; Dan Navarro
- Lyricist: Takashi Matsumoto
- Producer: Haruo Mizuhashi

Wink singles chronology
"Samishii Nettaigyo" (1989)	"One Night in Heaven (Mayonaka no Angel)" (1989)	"Sexy Music" (1990)

Music video
- "One Night in Heaven (Mayonaka no Angel)" on YouTube

"One Night in Heaven (Mayonaka no Angel)" (One Night In Heaven 〜真夜中のエンジェル〜; "One Night in Heaven (Midnight Angel)") is the sixth single by Japanese idol duo Wink. Written by Takashi Matsumoto, Steve Lironi, and Dan Navarro, the single was released on November 1, 1989 by Polystar Records.

== Background and release ==
"One Night in Heaven (Mayonaka no Angel)" was the first original Wink song to be co-written by foreign musicians. The song was used by Panasonic for their Maclord Movie NV-M10 camcorder commercial. It was also used as the ending theme of the TBS drama special Complex: Kawaii Ko ni Narenai (コンプレックス 可愛いコになれない; Complex: I Can't Be a Cute Girl).

"One Night in Heaven (Mayonaka no Angel)" became Wink's fourth No. 1 on the Oricon's weekly charts. It sold over 423,000 copies and was certified Platinum by the RIAJ.

== Track listing ==
All lyrics are written by Takashi Matsumoto; all music is arranged by Motoki Funayama.

No.	Title	Music	Length
1.	"One Night In Heaven (Mayonaka no Angel)" ((One Night In Heaven 〜真夜中のエンジェル〜; "One Night in Heaven (Midnight Angel)"))	Steve Lironi; Dan Navarro	4:07
2.	"Cat-Walk Dancing"	Hitoshi Haba	4:10

== Chart positions ==
Weekly charts

Chart (1989)	Peak position
Japanese Oricon Singles Chart	1

Year-end charts

Chart (1989)	Peak position
Japanese Oricon Singles Chart	38

== Certifications ==
Region	Certification	Certified units/sales
Japan (RIAJ)	Platinum	400,000^{^}
^{^} Shipments figures based on certification alone.

== See also ==
- 1989 in Japanese music
