= Samishii Nettaigyo =

Single by Wink

from the album Twin Memories
- Language: Japanese
- English title: Lonely Tropical Fish
- B-side: "Senaka made 500 Miles"
- Released: July 5, 1989
- Recorded: 1989
- Genre: J-pop; dance-pop
- Length: 4:30
- Label: Polystar
- Composer: Masaya Ozeki
- Lyricist: Neko Oikawa
- Producer: Haruo Mizuhashi

Wink singles chronology
| "Namida wo Misenai de (Boys Don't Cry)" (1989) | "Samishii Nettaigyo" (1989) | "One Night in Heaven (Mayonaka no Angel)" (1989) |

Music video
- "Samishii Nettaigyo" on YouTube

Samishii Nettaigyo (淋しい熱帯魚; lit. "Lonely Tropical Fish") is the fifth single by Japanese idol duo Wink. Written by Neko Oikawa and Masaya Ozeki, the single was released on July 5, 1989, by Polystar Records.

== Background and release ==
"Samishii Nettaigyo" was first used by Panasonic for their S-Type headphone commercial featuring Wink in mid-April 1989. The B-side is a Japanese-language cover of the Hedy West song "500 Miles".

"Samishii Nettaigyo" became Wink's third No. 1 on the Oricon's weekly charts. It sold over 564,000 copies and was certified Platinum by the RIAJ. The song won the Grand Prix award at the 31st Japan Record Awards. In addition, it led to the duo's first and only appearance on NHK's Kōhaku Uta Gassen in 1989.

== Track listing ==
All lyrics are written by Neko Oikawa; all music is arranged by Motoki Funayama.

| No. | Title | Music | Length |
|---|---|---|---|
| 1. | "Samishii Nettaigyo" ((淋しい熱帯魚; "Lonely Tropical Fish")) | Masaya Ozeki | 4:30 |
| 2. | "Senaka made 500 Miles" (Senaka made Gohyaku Mairu (背中まで500マイル; "500 Miles and Back")) | Hedy West | 3:38 |

== Chart positions ==
Weekly charts

| Chart (1989) | Peak position |
|---|---|
| Japanese Oricon Singles Chart | 1 |
| Japanese The Best Ten Chart | 1 |

Year-end charts

| Chart (1989) | Peak position |
|---|---|
| Japanese Oricon Singles Chart | 7 |

== Certifications ==
| Region | Certification | Certified units/sales |
|---|---|---|
| Japan (RIAJ) | Platinum | 400,000^{^} |
^{^} Shipments figures based on certification alone.

== Cover versions ==
- In 1990, the song was covered in Chinese Mandarin by Xiao Hu Dui as "Xing Xing De Yue Hui" (星星的約會) on their cover album of the same name.
- In 1991, the song was covered in English by The Nolans as "Tidal Wave" on their cover album Tidal Wave (Samishii Nettaigyo).
- In 2004, the song was covered by W on their debut album Duo U&U.
- In 2004, the song was covered by Nana Katase on her album Extended
- In 2005, the song was performed by ex-Morning Musume member Kaori Iida and Ruca at Flet's (フレッツ) Casual Dinner Show.
- In 2008, the song was covered by Kimiko Koyama for the anime Rosario + Vampire.
- In 2010, the song was covered by MAX on their 2010 cover album Be MAX.
- In 2017, the song was covered by FEMM on their album 80's/90's J-Pop Revival.
- In 2012, the song was covered by You Kikkawa on her 2012 cover album Vocalist?.
- In 2012, the song was covered in English by Janet Kay on her 2012 cover album Idol Kay.
- In 2019, the song was covered by Kazehikaru Fukurou (風光ル梟), as their second single.
- In 2019, the song was performed by Red Velvet members Joy and Yeri as a Special Stage at SMTOWN in Tokyo.
- In 2020, the song was parodied by Kyoko Fukada, Mikako Tabe, and Mei Nagano in a UQ Mobile commercial.
- In 2023, the song was covered by Japanese pop music duo ClariS.

== See also ==
- 1989 in Japanese music

| Preceded by "Paradise Ginga" (Hikaru Genji) | Japan Record Award Grand Prix; 1989 | Succeeded by "Odoru Pompokolin" (B.B.Queens) |
