= Where Were You Last Night (song) =

1989 single by Ankie Bagger

Single by Ankie Bagger

from the album Where Were You Last Night
- Released: October 1989
- Recorded: 1989
- Genre: dance-pop; Hi-NRG
- Length: 4:08
- Label: Sonet
- Songwriter: Norell Oson Bard
- Producers: Ola Håkansson; Anders Hansson; Tim Norell

Music video
- "Where Were You Last Night" on YouTube

"Where Were You Last Night" is a single by Swedish singer Ankie Bagger from the 1989 album Where Were You Last Night. Written by Norell Oson Bard, the single was released in October 1989 by Sonet Records. The song entered Swedish Trackslistan on 11 November 1989 and stayed on the chart for 6 weeks peaking at #4.

== Track listing ==
All tracks are written by Norell Oson Bard.

No.	Title	Length
1.	"Where Were You Last Night" (Remix)	7:46
2.	"Where Were You Last Night" (7" Version)	4:08
3.	"Where Were You Last Night" (Singback Version)	4:08

== Charts ==
Chart (1989–1990)	Peak position
Netherlands (Single Top 100)	72
Sweden (Sverigetopplistan)	13

== Wink version ==
"Yoru ni Hagurete (Where Were You Last Night)"

Single by Wink

from the album Crescent
- Language: Japanese
- English title: Where Were You Last Night
- B-side: "Omoide made Soba ni Ite (Welcome To The Edge)"
- Released: 4 July 1990
- Recorded: 1990
- Genre: J-pop; dance-pop
- Length: 4:25
- Label: Polystar
- Composer: Norell Oson Bard
- Lyricist: Neko Oikawa
- Producer: Haruo Mizuhashi

Wink singles chronology
"Sexy Music" (1990)	"Yoru ni Hagurete (Where Were You Last Night)" (1990)	"New Moon ni Aimashou" (1990)

Music video
- "Yoru ni Hagurete (Where Were You Last Night)" on YouTube

"Where Were You Last Night" was covered in Japanese by the idol duo Wink as "Yoru ni Hagurete (Where Were You Last Night)" (夜にはぐれて 〜Where Were You Last Night〜). Released on 4 July 1990 by Polystar Records, it was their eighth single, with Japanese lyrics written by Neko Oikawa. The B-side is a Japanese-language cover of Billie Hughes' "Welcome to the Edge".

Prior to the release of the single, Wink member Sachiko Suzuki was sidelined with acute hepatitis. Shoko Aida performed the song alone during TV appearances while Suzuki spent two weeks to recover.

The single peaked at No. 2 on Oricon's singles chart. It sold over 291,000 copies and was certified Gold by the RIAJ.

=== Track listing ===
All lyrics are written by Neko Oikawa; all music is arranged by Satoshi Kadokura.

No.	Title	Music	Length
1.	"Yoru ni Hagurete (Where Were You Last Night)" ((夜にはぐれて 〜Where Were You Last Night〜))	Norell Oson Bard	4:25
2.	"Omoide made Soba ni Ite (Welcome to the Edge)" ((想い出までそばにいて (Welcome To The Edge); "I'll Stay by Your Side Until You Remember (Welcome to the Edge)"))	Billie Hughes; Roxanne Seeman; Dominic Messinger	5:06

=== Charts ===
Weekly charts

Chart (1990)	Peak position
Japanese Oricon Singles Chart	2

Year-end charts

Chart (1990)	Peak position
Japanese Oricon Singles Chart	33

=== Certifications ===
Region	Certification	Certified units/sales
Japan (RIAJ)	Gold	200,000^{^}
^{^} Shipments figures based on certification alone.

== Other versions ==
- Finnish symphonic metal band Nightwish covered the song on their Wish I Had an Angel single.
