= Nolan Sisters (album) =

Studio album by the Nolan Sisters
- Released: 19 November 1979
- Recorded: 1979
- Genre: Pop
- Length: 42:05
- Label: Epic
- Producer: Ben Findon; Nicky Graham; Mike Myers; Mike Hurst

The Nolan Sisters chronology
20 Giant Hits (1978)	Nolan Sisters (1979)	Making Waves (1980)

Nolan Sisters is the fourth studio album by the Irish sibling pop group the Nolan Sisters. It was their first album to be released on Epic Records and contained a mixture of original material (composed for the group by Ben Findon, Mike Myers, and Robert Puzey) and cover versions of popular songs. Two singles, "Spirit Body and Soul" and "I'm In the Mood for Dancing", were released from the album, the latter becoming the group's best-known song, peaking at No.3 in the UK, while the former was also a top 40 hit. The release of that single also marked a group name change to the Nolans.

The album entered the UK chart in January 1980 and peaked at number 15. It remained on the chart for 13 weeks. In Japan, the album was released under the name Dancing Sisters. The album cover included, as well as the then line-up, Coleen Nolan, who became an official member of the group after Anne left the group in 1980.

The album was re-released on Compact Disc in June 2009 with the added bonus track "Harry My Honolulu Lover", which the group had entered into the British national final for the 1979 Eurovision Song Contest. Released by Cherry Red Records, it was packaged with the follow-up album, Making Waves.

== Track listing ==
Side A
No.	Title	Writer(s)	Length
1.	"I'm In the Mood for Dancing"	Ben Findon; Mike Myers; Robert Puzey	3:16
2.	"Spirit, Body and Soul"	Findon; Myers; Puzey	3:10
3.	"Out of Love with Love"	Dominic Bugatti; Frank Musker	3:30
4.	"Bright Eyes"	Mike Batt	3:47
5.	"Boogie All Summer"	Dan Hartman	3:39
6.	"Miss You Nights"	Dave Townsend	3:53

Side B
No.	Title	Writer(s)	Length
1.	"All the King's Horses"	Bugatti; Musker	3:07
2.	"I Know I'll Never Love this Way Again"	Richard Kerr; Will Jennings	3:21
3.	"Let's Make Love"	Findon; Myers	2:56
4.	"Thank You for the Music"	Benny Andersson; Björn Ulvaeus	4:11
5.	"Don't Let Me Be the Last to Know"	Findon; Myers	3:55
6.	"More to Love"	Findon; Myers; Puzey	3:20

2009 reissue bonus track
No.	Title	Writer(s)	Length
13.	"Harry My Honolulu Lover"	Terry Bradford	2:19

== Personnel ==
- Bernie Nolan – vocals
- Linda Nolan – vocals
- Maureen Nolan – vocals
- Anne Nolan – vocals
- Coleen Nolan – additional vocals (tracks 4 and 10)
- Ben Findon – producer (tracks 1, 2, 9, 11, 12)
- Mike Myers – assistant producer (tracks 1, 2, 9, 11, 12)
- Nicky Graham – producer (tracks 4, 5, 6, 7, 8, 10)
- Mike Hurst – producer (track 3)
- Tim Young – mastering

== Chart performance ==
Release date	Single title	UK Chart position
September 1979	"Spirit Body and Soul"	34
December 1979	"I'm in the Mood for Dancing"	3
Release date	Album title	UK Chart position
November 1979	Nolan Sisters	15
