= B.B.Queens =

Japanese pop band

- Origin: Japan
- Genre: J-pop
- Years active: 1990–1993; 2011; 2019
- Labels: BMG Rooms, B-Gram Records
- Past members: Yuiko Tsubokura (Vocals); Fusanosuke Kondo (Vocals); Haruka Murakami (Chorus); Mami Watanabe (Chorus); Seichiro Kuribayashi (Bass); Eisuke Mochizuki (Keyboard); Keiko Utoku (Chorus); Takashi Masuzaki (Guitar)
- Website: Official website

B.B. Queens was a J-pop co-ed group that was active for three years between 1990 and 1993. Their debut single, "Odoru Pompokolin", ranked first on the Oricon charts in 1990 and won the 32nd Japan Record Awards. It ranked third on the JASRAC lists for 1991 and was certified as a Million Record.

The three backup singers – Keiko Utoku, Mami Watanabe, and Haruka Murakami – formed an offshoot group known as Mi-Ke with several chart singles produced by B. B. Queens. In 2011, the group briefly reunited for its special album project. In 2012, B.B. Queens joined in the part of Live Tour "Being Legend in 2012", with only Kondo and Tsubokura, while Utoku was representing the sub-group Mi-ke. Since 2019, only Tsubokura and Kondo appear as current members of the group in the appearances of live music television shows.

== Discography ==
=== Albums ===
- We Are B.B. Queens (1990)
- Party (1990)
- Manatsu no B.B.Queens (真夏のB.B.クィーンズ) (1991)
- Royal Straight B.B.Queens (2011)

=== Compilation albums ===
- Sing!! Sega Game Music presented by B.B.Queens (1992)
- Complete of B.B. Queens at the Being studio (2002)
- Best of Best 1000 B.B. Queens (2007)

=== Singles ===
- "Odoru Pompokolin" (おどるポンポコリン, Odoru Ponpokorin) (1990)
- "Gingira Paradise" (ギンギラパラダイス, Gingira Paradaisu) (1991)
- "Bokura no Nanokakan Sensō: Seven Days Dream" (ぼくらの七日間戦争〜Seven Days Dream〜) (1991)
- "Kiss no Tochū" (キスの途中, Kisu no Tochū) (1991)
- "Do Re Mi Fa Daijōbu" (ドレミファだいじょーぶ) (1991)
- "Yume no End wa Itsumo Mezamashi!" (夢のENDはいつも目覚まし!) (1992)
- "Odoru Pompokolin (Chibi Maruko-chan 25th Birthday Version)" (おどるポンポコリン～ちびまる子ちゃん 誕生 25th Version～, Odoru Ponpokorin (Chibi Marukochan Tanjō 25th Version); May 1, 2011)

=== Other songs ===
- "Kimi ni Kokekokkō!" (君にコケコッコー!)
- "Shogenai de yo Baby" (しょげないでよBaby)

== Television appearances ==
- 41st Kōhaku Uta Gassen: Odoru Pompokolin

== See also ==
- Being Inc.
