= Sexy Music =

1981 song by The Nolans

Single by The Nolans

from the album Making Waves
- B-side: "Don't Make Waves"
- Released: 21 March 1981
- Recorded: 1980
- Genre: Disco
- Length: 3:42
- Label: Epic
- Songwriters: Ben Findon; Mike Myers; Bob Puzey
- Producer: Ben Findon

The Nolans singles chronology
"Who's Gonna Rock You" (1980)	"Sexy Music" (1981)	"Attention to Me" (1981)

Music video
- "Sexy Music" on YouTube

"Sexy Music" (セクシー・ミュージック, Sekushī Myūjikku) is a single by Irish female vocal group The Nolans, from their 1980 album Making Waves. Released exclusively in Japan by Epic Records on March 21, 1981, the single was a commercial success, selling over 270,000 copies. The song also made the Nolans the first European act to win the Grand Prix at the Tokyo Music Festival.

== Track listing ==
All tracks are written by Ben Findon, Mike Myers, and Bob Puzey.

No.	Title	Length
1.	"Sexy Music"	3:42
2.	"Don't Make Waves"	3:42

== Charts and sales ==
Year	Chart	Position	Sales
1981	Japanese Oricon Singles Chart (top 100)	7	270,000+

== Wink version ==
"Sexy Music"

Single by Wink

from the album Velvet
- Language: Japanese
- B-side: "Ichiban Kanashii Bara"
- Released: 28 March 1990
- Recorded: 1989
- Genre: J-pop; dance-pop
- Length: 3:43
- Label: Polystar
- Composers: Ben Findon; Mike Myers; Bob Puzey
- Lyricist: Neko Oikawa
- Producer: Haruo Mizuhashi

Wink singles chronology
"One Night in Heaven (Mayonaka no Angel)" (1989)	"Sexy Music" (1990)	"Yoru ni Hagurete (Where Were You Last Night)" (1990)

Music video
- "Sexy Music" on YouTube

"Sexy Music" was covered in Japanese by the idol duo Wink. Released on 28 March 1990 by Polystar Records, it was their seventh single, with Japanese lyrics written by Neko Oikawa.

The single became the duo's fifth and final No. 1 on Oricon's singles chart. It sold over 329,000 copies and was certified Gold by the RIAJ.

=== Track listing ===
All lyrics are written by Neko Oikawa.

No.	Title	Music	Arrangement	Length
1.	"Sexy Music"	Ben Findon; Mike Myers; Bob Puzey	Satoshi Kadokura	3:42
2.	"Ichiban Kanashii Bara" ((いちばん哀しい薔薇; "The Saddest Rose"))	Kisaburō Suzuki	Motoki Funayama	4:24

=== Charts ===
Weekly charts

Chart (1990)	Peak position
Japanese Oricon Singles Chart	1

Year-end charts

Chart (1990)	Peak position
Japanese Oricon Singles Chart	24

=== Certifications ===
Region	Certification	Certified units/sales
Japan (RIAJ)	Gold	200,000^{^}
^{^} Shipments figures based on certification alone.

== Other cover versions ==
In 1981, the song was covered and re-lyriced by Taiwanese singer Frankie Kao (高凌風, Gāo Língfēng) as "A Fire in Winter" (冬天裡的一把火, Dōngtiānli de Yì Bǎ Huŏ), which was later covered, with much more success, by Fei Xiang (費翔, Fèi Xiáng). Having had some success prior, he reached superstar status almost overnight when in 1987, he performed this song in CCTV's new year gala. The song became an instant hit in Mainland China.

The song was also covered in Korean by the South Korean band Q. Big (큐빅) for their 2003 album "In The Groove".
