= Dan Navarro =

American singer-songwriter

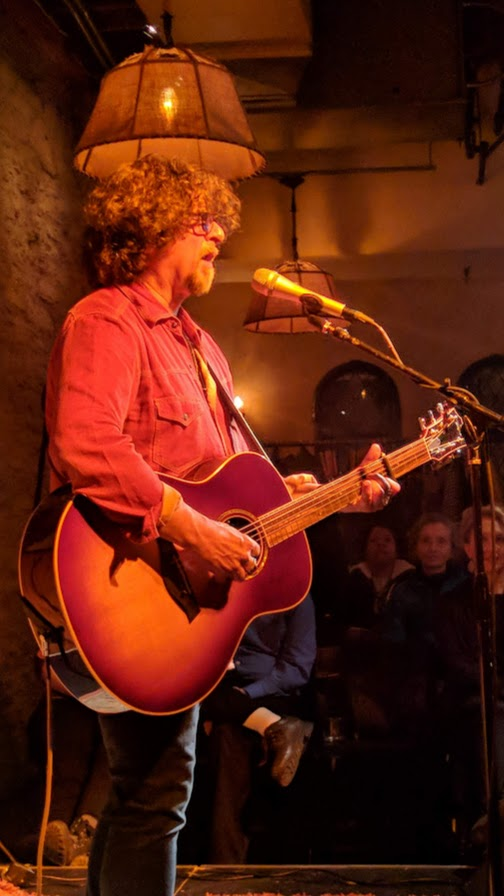
Navarro performing in Minneapolis in 2019.

Dan Navarro (born Daniel Anthony Navarro, September 14, 1952) is an American vocalist, guitarist and voice actor best known as half of the duo Lowen & Navarro. He is first cousins with Dave Navarro of Jane's Addiction and the Red Hot Chili Peppers.

== Discography ==
=== Singles ===
==== Lowen and Navarro ====
- "We Belong"

=== Albums ===
==== Lowen and Navarro ====
- Walking on a Wire (Chameleon Records, 1990)
- Broken Moon (Parachute Records, 1993)
- Walking on a Wire re-release with bonus tracks (Parachute Records, 1994)
- Pendulum (Parachute Records, 1995)
- Live Wire (Intersound, 1997)
- Scratch at the Door (Intersound, 1998)
- Live Radio (Red Hen Records, 2002)
- 3 For The Road (Mad Raine Music, 2003)
- At Long Last...Christmas (Red Hen Records, 2004)
- All the Time in the World (Red Hen Records, 2004)
- Hogging the Covers (Red Hen Records, 2006)
- Learning To Fall (Red Hen Records, 2008)

==== Solo ====
- Dan Navarro w/ Stonehoney - Live At McCabe's (Red Hen Records, 2009)
- Shed My Skin (Red Hen Records, 2018 / Blue Rose Records, 2019)
- Skinless: The Shed My Skin Demos (Red Hen Records, 2021)
- Horizon Line (Red Hen Records, 2022)

== Television and film ==
- Deadloch - Episode 8 (2023) (writer: "We Belong")
- Puss in Boots: The Last Wish - This Is The End (2022)
- Playmobil: The Movie - Viking Leader (2019)
- We Bare Bears - Blue-Eye Ramon (Episode: El Osos) (2018)
- The Book of Life - Chakal (2014)
- The Lorax - Dan's singing voice (2012)
- American Dad! - Roy Rogers McFreely (2009) Played a character named Cilantro
- Prison Break (2007) (writer: "All Along the Watchtower")
- The Office - A Benihana Christmas (2006) (writer: "We Belong")
- Talladega Nights: The Ballad of Ricky Bobby (2006) (writer: "We Belong")
- Diva (2006) (V) (writer: "Mi pasión (We Belong) (Live)")
- Envy (2004) (performer: "Envy", "Old Drunk Philosopher")
- Blue Desert (1991) (writer: "What I Make Myself Believe")
- Casual Sex? (1988) (writer: "(She's A) Wild Card")
- Roxanne (1987) (performer: "Party Tonight")
- Police Academy 4: Citizens on Patrol (1987) (writer: "It's Time To Move")
- The Ratings Game (1984) (performer: "Sittin' Pretty", "The Goombas", "Gimme Five")

== Videogames ==
- Red Dead Redemption 2 - The Local Pedestrian Population (2018)
- Uncharted 4: A Thief's End - Additional Voices (2016)
- Fallout 4 - Jacob Orden, Dean Volkert (2015)
- Grand Theft Auto: Vice City Stories (2006) (writer: "We Belong")
