= B'z discography =

Musical artist discography

- Studio albums: 23
- Extended plays: 6
- Live albums: 20
- Singles: 54

Japanese rock duo B'z has released 23 studio albums, 12 compilation albums, nine extended plays (EP), 62 singles, and 20 live albums. (Note: The band only counts physical media towards official totals, so the official numbers are nine compilations (the "Songless" albums aren't counted), six EPs (mini-albums), and 54 singles.) With more than 86 million sales in Japan, the duo is the best-selling artist in Japan and with 100 million sales one of the best-selling music artists of all time.

== Albums ==
=== Studio albums ===
Title	Album details	Peak chart positions	Sales	Certifications
Title	Album details	JPN	Sales	Certifications
B'z	Released: September 21, 1988; Label: Air; Formats: CD, LP, cassette, download	47	JPN: 338,360	
Off the Lock	Released: May 21, 1989; Label: Air; Formats: CD, LP, cassette, download	33	JPN: 604,700	RIAJ: Million
Break Through	Released: February 21, 1990; Label: Air; Formats: CD, LP, cassette, download	3	JPN: 724,640	RIAJ: Million
Risky	Released: November 7, 1990; Label: ZEZ; Formats: CD, LP, cassette, download	1	JPN: 1,695,900	RIAJ: Million
In the Life	Released: November 27, 1991; Label: ZEZ; Formats: CD, LP, cassette, download	1	JPN: 2,402,970	RIAJ: 2× Million
Run	Released: October 28, 1992; Label: ZEZ; Formats: CD, LP, cassette, download	1	JPN: 2,196,660	RIAJ: 2× Million
The 7th Blues	Released: March 2, 1994; Label: ZEZ; Formats: CD, LP, cassette, download	1	JPN: 1,630,450	RIAJ: 4× Platinum
Loose	Released: November 22, 1995; Label: Rooms; Formats: CD, LP, download	1	JPN: 3,003,210	RIAJ: 3× Million
Survive	Released: November 19, 1997; Label: Rooms; Formats: CD, LP, download	1	JPN: 1,723,030	RIAJ: 2× Million
Brotherhood	Released: July 14, 1999; Label: Rooms; Formats: CD, LP, download	1	JPN: 1,391,850	RIAJ: Million
Eleven	Released: December 6, 2000; Label: Rooms; Formats: CD, LP, download	1	JPN: 1,132,180	RIAJ: Million
Green	Released: July 3, 2002; Label: Vermillion; Formats: CD, LP, download	1	JPN: 1,131,788	RIAJ: 3× Platinum
Big Machine	Released: September 17, 2003; Label: Vermillion; Formats: CD, LP, download	1	JPN: 746,451	RIAJ: 3× Platinum
The Circle	Released: April 6, 2005; Label: Vermillion; Formats: CD, LP, download	1	JPN: 557,783	RIAJ: 2× Platinum
Monster	Released: June 28, 2006; Label: Vermillion; Formats: CD, LP, download	1	JPN: 539,708	RIAJ: 2× Platinum
Action	Released: December 5, 2007; Label: Vermillion; Formats: CD, LP, download	1	JPN: 440,108	RIAJ: Platinum
Magic	Released: November 18, 2009; Label: Vermillion; Formats: CD, LP, download	1	JPN: 488,468	RIAJ: 2× Platinum
C'mon	Released: July 27, 2011; Label: Vermillion; Formats: CD, LP, download	1	JPN: 383,428	RIAJ: Platinum
Epic Day	Released: March 4, 2015; Label: Vermillion; Formats: CD, LP, download	1	JPN: 294,329	RIAJ: Platinum
Dinosaur	Released: November 29, 2017; Label: Vermillion; Formats: CD, LP, download	1	JPN: 240,846	RIAJ: Platinum
New Love	Released: May 29, 2019; Label: Vermillion; Formats: CD, LP, download	1	JPN: 270,370	RIAJ: Platinum
Highway X	Released: August 10, 2022; Label: Vermillion; Formats: CD, download	1	JPN: 156,391	RIAJ: Gold
FYOP	Released: November 12, 2025; Label: Vermillion; Formats: CD, download	1	JPN: 178,523	RIAJ: Gold

=== Compilation albums ===
Title	Album details	Peak chart positions	Sales	Certifications
Title	Album details	JPN	Sales	Certifications
B'z TV Style Songless version	Released: February 19, 1992; Label: BMG Japan; Formats: CD	2	JPN: 231,341	RIAJ: Gold
B'z TV Style II Songless version	Released: December 20, 1995; Label: Rooms; Formats: CD	17	JPN: 109,280	
B'z The Best "Pleasure"	Released: May 20, 1998; Label: Rooms; Formats: CD	1	JPN: 5,135,922	RIAJ: 5× Million
B'z The Best "Treasure"	Released: September 20, 1998; Label: Rooms; Formats: CD	1	JPN: 4,438,742	RIAJ: 4× Million
B'z The "Mixture"	Released: February 23, 2000; Label: Berg; Formats: CD	1	JPN: 1,499,810	RIAJ: 4× Platinum
The Ballads ~Love & B'z~	Released: December 11, 2002; Label: Vermillion; Formats: CD	1	JPN: 1,713,726	RIAJ: 4× Platinum
The Complete B'z	Released: August 1, 2005; Label: Vermillion; Formats: Download	—		
B'z The Best "Pleasure II"	Released: November 30, 2005; Label: Vermillion; Formats: CD	1	JPN: 1,183,424	RIAJ: Million
B'z The Best "Ultra Pleasure"	Released: June 18, 2008; Label: Vermillion; Formats: CD	1	JPN: 979,558	RIAJ: Million
B'z The Best "Ultra Treasure"	Released: September 17, 2008; Label: Vermillion; Formats: CD	1	JPN: 614,376	RIAJ: 2× Platinum
B'z The Best XXV 1988–1998	Released: June 12, 2013; Label: Vermillion; Formats: CD	1	JPN: 583,230	RIAJ: 2× Platinum
B'z The Best XXV 1999–2012	Released: June 12, 2013; Label: Vermillion; Formats: CD	2	JPN: 573,050	RIAJ: 2× Platinum
"—" denotes a recording that did not chart or was not released in that territory.

=== Live albums ===
Title	Album details	Peak chart positions			Sales	Certifications
Title	Album details	JPN			Sales	Certifications
Title	Album details	VHS	DVD	Blu-ray	Sales	Certifications
Just Another Life	Released: December 11, 1991 (JPN); Label: BMG Japan; Formats: VHS, LaserDisc	1	—	—		
Live Ripper	Released: December 9, 1993 (JPN); Label: BMG Japan; Formats: VHS, LaserDisc, DVD	1	—	—		
"Buzz!!" The Movie	Released: January 1, 1996 (JPN); Label: Rooms; Formats: VHS, DVD	1	5	—		
Once Upon a Time in Yokohama: B'z Live Gym'99 "Brotherhood"	Released: December 8, 1999 (JPN); Label: Rooms; Formats: VHS, DVD	1	—	—		
A Beautiful Reel. B'z Live-Gym 2002 Green: Go Fight Win	Released: November 27, 2002 (JPN); Label: B-Vision; Formats: VHS, DVD	—	1	—		
Typhoon No.15 ~B'z Live-Gym The Final Pleasure "It's Showtime!!" in Nagisaen~	Released: February 25, 2004 (JPN); Label: B-Vision; Formats: VHS, DVD	—	1	—		RIAJ: Platinum
B'z Live-Gym 2006: Monster's Garage	Released: December 20, 2006 (JPN); Label: B-Vision; Formats: DVD, Blu-ray	—	1	—		RIAJ: Gold
B'z Live in Nanba	Released: February 20, 2008 (JPN); Label: B-Vision; Formats: VHS, DVD	—	1	—		RIAJ: Gold
B'z Live-Gym Hidden Pleasure: Typhoon No.20	Released: December 10, 2008 (JPN); Label: B-Vision; Formats: DVD	—N/a	1	—		RIAJ: Gold
B'z Live-Gym Pleasure 2008: Glory Days	Released: February 25, 2009 (JPN); Label: B-Vision; Formats: DVD, Blu-ray	—N/a	1	26		RIAJ: Gold
B'z Live-Gym 2010 "Ain't No Magic" at Tokyo Dome	Released: July 28, 2010 (JPN); Label: Vermillion; Formats: DVD, Blu-ray	—N/a	1	—		RIAJ: Gold
B'z Live Gym 2011-C'mon-	Released: May 30, 2012 (JPN); Label: Vermillion; Formats: DVD, Blu-ray	—N/a	1	1		RIAJ: Gold
B'z Live Gym 2008 Action	Released: January 30, 2013 (JPN); Label: Vermillion; Formats: DVD, Blu-ray	—N/a	2	1		RIAJ: Gold
B'z Live Gym 2005 -Circle of Rock-	Released: February 27, 2013 (JPN); Label: Vermillion; Formats: DVD	—N/a	2	—		
B'z Live Gym 2001 -Eleven-	Released: March 27, 2013 (JPN); Label: Vermillion; Formats: DVD	—N/a	3	—		
B'z Live-Gym Pleasure 2013 Endless Summer -XXV BEST-	Released: January 29, 2014 (JPN); Label: Vermillion; Formats: DVD, Blu-ray	—N/a	2	1		RIAJ: Gold
B'z Live-Gym 2015 -Epic Night-	Released: February 24, 2016 (JPN); Label: Vermillion; Formats: DVD, Blu-ray	—N/a	2	2		RIAJ: Gold
B'z Live-Gym 2017–2018 "Live Dinosaur"	Released: July 4, 2018 (JPN); Label: Vermillion; Formats: DVD, Blu-ray	—N/a	1	1	JPN: 109,537	RIAJ: Gold
B'z Live-Gym Pleasure 2018 -Hinotori-	Released: March 13, 2019 (JPN); Label: Vermillion; Formats: DVD, Blu-ray	—N/a	1	1	JPN: 147,991	RIAJ: Gold
B'z Live-Gym -Whole Lotta New Love-	Released: February 26, 2020 (JPN); Label: Vermillion; Formats: DVD, Blu-ray	—N/a	1	1		RIAJ: Gold
"—" denotes a recording that did not chart or was not released in that territory.

== Extended plays ==
Title	EP details	Peak chart positions	Sales	Certifications
Title	EP details	JPN	Sales	Certifications
Bad Communication	Released: October 21, 1989 (JPN); Label: Air; Formats: CD, cassette, download	12	JPN: 1,182,010	RIAJ: 3× Platinum
Wicked Beat	Released: June 21, 1990 (JPN); Label: Rooms; Formats: CD, cassette, download	3	JPN: 1,111,230	RIAJ: 3× Platinum
Mars	Released: May 29, 1991 (JPN); Label: Rooms; Formats: CD, cassette, download	1	JPN: 1,730,500	RIAJ: 4× Platinum
Friends	Released: December 9, 1992 (JPN); Label: Rooms; Formats: CD, cassette, download	1	JPN: 1,355,530	RIAJ: 2× Million
Friends II	Released: November 25, 1996 (JPN); Label: Rooms; Formats: CD, download	1	JPN: 1,466,650	RIAJ: 4× Platinum
Devil	Released: April 23, 2002 (KOR); Label: Being Korea; Formats: CD	—		
B'z	Released: April 3, 2007 (VAR); Label: Vermillion; Formats: Download	—		
B'z	Released: July 25, 2012 (VAR); Label: Vermillion; Formats: Download	—		
Friends III	Released: December 8, 2021; Label: Vermillion; Formats: CD, download	1	JPN: 132,263	
"—" denotes a recording that did not chart or was not released in that territory.

== Singles ==
=== Physical singles ===
List of singles as lead artist, with chart positions and certifications
Title	Year	Peak chart positions		Sales	Certifications	Album
Title	Year	JPN	JPN Hot	Sales	Certifications	Album
"Dakara Sono Te o Hanashite" (だからその手を離して)	1988	—	—			B'z
"Kimi no Naka de Odoritai" (君の中で踊りたい)	1989	—	—			Off the Lock
"Lady-Go-Round"	1990	39	—			Break Through
"Be There"	1990	3	—		RIAJ: Platinum	Non-album singles
"Taiyō no Komachi Angel" (太陽のKomachi Angel)	1990	1	—		RIAJ: 2× Platinum	Non-album singles
"Easy Come, Easy Go!"	1990	1	—		RIAJ: Platinum	Risky
"Itoshii Hitoyo Good Night…" (愛しい人よGood Night...)	1990	1	—		RIAJ: Platinum	Risky
"Lady Navigation"	1991	1	—		RIAJ: 3× Platinum	Non-album single
"Alone"	1991	1	—		RIAJ: Million	In The Life
"Blowin'"	1992	1	21 (Note: Charted in 2008.)		RIAJ: 4× Platinum	Non-album single
"Zero"	1992	1	—		RIAJ: Million	Run
"Ai no mama ni Wagamama ni Boku wa Kimi dake o Kizutsukenai" 愛のままにわがままに 僕は君だけを傷つけない)	1993	1	—		RIAJ: 2× Million	Non-album singles
"Hadashi no Megami" (裸足の女神)	1993	1	—		RIAJ: 4× Platinum	Non-album singles
"Don't Leave Me"	1994	1	—		RIAJ: 3× Platinum	The 7th Blues
"Motel"	1994	1	—		RIAJ: Million	Non-album single
"Negai" (lit. "Wish"; ねがい)	1995	1	—		RIAJ: Million	Loose
"Love Me, I Love You"	1995	1	—		RIAJ: Million	Loose
"Love Phantom"	1995	1	51 (Note: Charted in 2025.)		RIAJ: 4× Platinum	Loose
"Mienai Chikara (Invisible One)/Move" (ミエナイチカラ~Invisible One~/Move)	1996	1	—		RIAJ: 3× Platinum	Non-album singles
"Real Thing Shakes"	1996	1	—		RIAJ: 3× Platinum	Non-album singles
"Fireball"	1997	1	—		RIAJ: Million	Survive
"Calling"	1997	1	—		RIAJ: Million	Survive
"Liar! Liar!"	1997	1	—		RIAJ: Million	Survive
"Samayoeru Aoi Dangan" (さまよえる蒼い弾丸)	1998	1	—		RIAJ: Million	Non-album singles
"Home"	1998	1	76 (Note: Charted in 2020.)		RIAJ: Million	Non-album singles
"Giri Giri Chop" (ギリギリChop)	1999	1	—		RIAJ: 2× Platinum	Brotherhood
"Kon'ya Tsuki no Mieru Oka ni" (今夜月の見える丘に)	2000	1	96 (Note: Charted in 2013.)		RIAJ: 3× Platinum	Eleven
"May"	2000	1	—		RIAJ: Platinum	Eleven
"Juice"	2000	1	—		RIAJ: Platinum	Eleven
"Ring"	2000	1	—		RIAJ: Platinum	Eleven
"Ultra Soul"	2001	1	27 (Note: Charted in 2011.)		RIAJ: Platinum	Green
"Gold"	2001	1	—		RIAJ: Platinum	Non-album single
"Atsuki Kodō no Hate" (熱き鼓動の果て)	2002	1	—		RIAJ: Platinum	Green
"It's Showtime!"	2003	1	—		RIAJ: 2× Platinum	Big Machine
"Yasei no Energy" (野性のEnergy)	2003	1	—		RIAJ: Platinum	Big Machine
"Banzai"	2004	1	—		RIAJ: Platinum	Non-album singles
"Arigato"	2004	1	—		RIAJ: Platinum	Non-album singles
"Ai no Bakudan" (愛のバクダン)	2005	1	—		RIAJ: Platinum	The Circle
"Ocean"	2005	1	—		RIAJ: 2× Platinum	Monster
"Shōdō" (衝動)	2006	1	—		RIAJ: Platinum	Monster
"Yuruginai Mono Hitotsu" (ゆるぎないものひとつ)	2006	1	—		RIAJ: Platinum	Monster
"Splash!"	2006	1	—		RIAJ: Platinum	Monster
"Eien no Tsubasa" (永遠の翼)	2007	1	—		RIAJ: Platinum	Action
"Super Love Song"	2007	1	—		RIAJ: Platinum	Action
"Burn (Fumetsu no Face)" (Burn -フメツノフェイス-)	2008	1	1		RIAJ: Gold	Non-album single
"Ichibu to Zenbu/Dive" (イチブトゼンブ/Dive)	2009	1	1		RIAJ: Platinum	Magic
"My Lonely Town"	2009	1	1		RIAJ: Platinum	Magic
"Sayonara Kizu Darake no Hibi yo" (さよなら傷だらけの日々よ)	2011	1	1		RIAJ: Gold	C'mon
"Don't Wanna Lie"	2011	1	2		RIAJ: Gold	C'mon
"Go for It, Baby (Kioku no Sanmyaku)" (Go for it, Baby -キオクの山脈-)	2012	1	1		RIAJ: Gold	Non-album single
"Uchōten" (有頂天)	2015	1	1		RIAJ: Gold	Epic Day
"Red"	2015	1	1		RIAJ: Gold	Non-album single
"Seimei/Still Alive" (声明/Still Alive)	2017	1	1	JPN: 158,519	RIAJ: Gold	Dinosaur
"Stars"	2023	1	4	JPN: 117,600	RIAJ: Gold	Non-album single
"—" denotes a recording that did not chart or was not released in that territory.

=== Digital singles ===
List of digital singles, with chart positions and certifications
Title	Year	Peak chart positions	Certifications	Album
Title	Year	JPN Hot	Certifications	Album
"Friction"	2007	—		Action
"Into Free (Dangan)"	2012	16	RIAJ: Gold	B'z (2012 EP)
"Sekai wa Anata no Iro ni Naru" (世界はあなたの色になる)	2016	13		Non-album singles
"Fukiarenasai" (フキアレナサイ)	2016	15		Non-album singles
"Kimi to Nara" (きみとなら)	2021	37		Non-album singles
"Sexual Violet No. 1" (セクシャルバイオレットNo.1)	2021	—		Take Me to Kazemachi!: Takashi Matsumoto 50th Anniversary Tribute Album
"Unite"	2021	9		Highway X
"Sleepless"	2022	18		Highway X
"Get Wild"	2024	12		TM Network Tribute Album: 40th Celebration
"Illumination" (イルミネーション)	2024	25		FYOP
"Muchi" (鞭)	2025	64		FYOP
"FMP"	2025	57		FYOP
"Heaven Knows"	2026	53		TBA
"Kanzen Muketsu" (完全無欠)	2026	27		TBA
"—" denotes a recording that did not chart or was not released in that territory.

== Other charted or certified songs ==
List of songs not released as singles, with chart positions and certifications
Title	Year	Peak chart positions	Certifications	Album
Title	Year	JPN Hot	Certifications	Album
"Bad Communication"	1989	49 (Note: Charted in 2008.)		Bad Communication
"Mou Ichido Kiss Shitakatta" (もう一度キスしたかった)	1991	—	RIAJ: Gold	In the Life
"Itsuka no Merry Christmas" (いつかのメリークリスマス)	1992	15 (Note: Charted in 2011.)	RIAJ: Platinum	Friends
"Koi-Gokoro" (恋心)	1992	86 (Note: Charted in 2008.)		"Zero" B-side
"Glory Days" (グローリーデイズ)	2008	18		B'z The Best "Ultra Treasure"
"Itsuka Mata Koko de" (いつかまたここで)	2008	73	RIAJ: Gold	B'z The Best "Ultra Treasure"
"C'mon"	2011	17		C'mon
"Love Bomb"	2012	33	RIAJ: Gold	B'z (2012 EP)
"Ultra Soul" (English Version)	2012	36	RIAJ: Gold	B'z (2012 EP)
"Splash" (English Version)	2012	61		B'z (2012 EP)
"Juice" (English Version)	2012	63		B'z (2012 EP)
"Las Vegas"	2015	25		Epic Day
"Dinosaur"	2017	64		Dinosaur
"Tsuwamono, Hashiru"	2019	57	RIAJ: Gold	New Love
"—" denotes a recording that did not chart or was not released in that territory.

== Other ==
=== B'z songs recorded by other musicians ===
- Eric Suen recorded "Easy Come, Easy Go!" as the theme for the 2000 Taiwanese drama Huai Yu Gong Zhu (懷玉公主). The title of the Chinese version is "Wei Feng Shi Ke" (威風時刻).
- Priscilla Chan released a Cantonese version of "Native Dance" called "放鬆三分鐘" on her 1993 album 你身邊永是我.
- Aya Kamiki covered "Pierrot" as her second major-label single in 2006.
- Aya Kamiki has also included "Love Phantom" and "Juice" in several of her live performances.
- An arrangement of "Atsuki Kodō no Hate" (熱き鼓動の果て) appeared as a stage theme in the 2005 Nintendo DS rhythm game Osu! Tatakae! Ouendan. The performance is credited to Tetsushi Kimura.
- Eric Martin released an English version of "いつかのメリークリスマス" (Itsuka no Merry Christmas) on Mr. Vocalist X'mas (2009) and "Alone" on Mr. Rock Vocalist (2012).
- Longtime drummer for the band, Shane Gaalaas, released an English cover of "Brotherhood" on his 2013 album Ascend.

=== Songs covered by B'z ===
- "This Love" by Maroon 5 on The Complete B'z.
- "Sexual Violet No. 1" by Masahiro Kuwana on Take Me to Kazemachi!: Takashi Matsumoto 50th Anniversary Tribute Album.
- "Oh! Darling" by The Beatles on B'z Live-Gym Pleasure 2008 -Glory Days-.
- "Let It Be" by The Beatles on Music Station Special.
- "Train Kept A-Rollin'" by Tiny Bradshaw at the 2002 FIFA World Cup International Day Concert (with Aerosmith).
- "Mama Kin" by Aerosmith at Aerosonic (with Aerosmith).
- "Crazy Night" by Loudness at B'z Special Live at Ex Theater Roppongi and Rockrock 20th Anniversary Live "Rock Beyond Rock" (with Loudness).
- "Sweet Child O' Mine" by Guns N' Roses" was played live during the B'z Live-Gym '91~'92 "In the Life" tour.
- "Jealous Guy" by John Lennon/Plastic Ono Band on Music Fair.
- "Knockin' on Heaven's Door" by Bob Dylan on Music Fair and was played live during the B'z Live-Gym '91~'92 "In the Life" tour.

=== Featured songs ===
- "Into Free" was used as the title song for the Capcom video game Dragon's Dogma.
- "Receive You Reborn" was used as an intro theme and battle theme in the Japanese version of the SEGA video game Yakuza: Kiwami
- "哀しきDreamer", B-Side from "Fireball" single, was used in the PlayStation game Indy 500.
- During the height of The X-Files' popularity in Japan, "Love Phantom" was used as the closing credits theme song.
- "Devil", an English cover of their song "Tokyo Devil", was produced for the 2002 FIFA World Cup Korea/Japan.
- "兵、走る" (Tsuwamono, Hashiru) was produced to be a theme song for the 2019 Rugby World Cup official sponsor Lipovitan. Thus, this song is a "rugby song", used in several rugby TV broadcast channels, like J-Sports and The Rugby Channel.
- "Atsuki Kodou no Hate" appears in the arcade drumming game Taiko no Tatsujin 4, and recently in the Nintendo DS rhythm game Osu! Tatakae! Ouendan.
- "Bad Communication" appears in the Game Boy Color rhythm game beatmania GB GotchaMIX2.
- "Kon'ya Tsuki no Mieru Oka ni" was used in the 2000 TV drama Beautiful Life.
- "Change the Future" was used as the Japanese opening theme for the 2003 TV series Zentrix.
- "Ocean" was used in the 2005 TV drama of the Umizaru Evolution project.
- Koshi Inaba's "Akai Ito" was used as one of the ending themes for the 2006 anime Kekkaishi.
- "Liar! Liar!" appears in the arcade and PlayStation 2 rhythm game GuitarFreaks 4th Mix & DrumMania 3rd Mix (known on the PS2 as GitaDora! GuitarFreaks 4th Mix & DrumMania 3rd Mix). This song has been removed from the series as of GuitarFreaks 7th Mix & DrumMania 6th Mix.
- "ultra soul" appears in the arcade drumming game Taiko no Tatsujin 2. It also appears in Rocksmith 2014.
- "Friction" is featured on the PlayStation 2 and PlayStation Portable game Burnout Dominator. This marked their first appearance in a western video game. It is also included in the PlayStation 3 and Xbox 360 game Burnout Paradise, as well as its HD remaster available on PlayStation 4, Nintendo Switch, Xbox One, and PC.
- Several B'z and solo songs were used in the Detective Conan anime series:
  - "Giri Giri Chop" (TV series OP Ep. 143–167)
  - "One" (Movie No. 3 ED)
  - Koshi Inaba's "Overture" (TV series ED Ep. 300–306)
  - "Everlasting" (Movie No. 6 ED)
  - "Shoudou" (TV series OP Ep. 425–437)
  - "Yuruginaimono Hitotsu" (Movie No. 10 ED)
  - "Don't Wanna Lie" (Movie No. 15 ED & TV Series OP Ep. 613–626)
  - "Pilgrim" (TV series ED Ep. 627-628 & Magic Kaito ED Ep. 1–2)
  - "Q&A" (TV series OP Ep. 696–717)
  - "Sekai wa Anata no Iro ni Naru" (Movie No. 20 ED & TV series OP Ep. 817–844)
  - "Sleepless" (TV series OP Ep. 1033–1048)
- "Roots" was also used as the ending theme to the four-part Black Jack OVA series to promote the then-newest TV series. Tak Matsumoto also did the opening "The Theme of B.J."
- "Lonely Stars" was used in the ending credits in the movie, The Legend of Raoh II: Fierce Fighting Arc (ラオウ伝II 激闘の章, Raō Den II Gekitō no Shō) which is part of the Fist of the North Star anime series.
- "Ore to Omae no Atarashii Kisetsu" (オレとオマエの新しい季節) is currently used as the ending theme to the Japanese dub of The O.C..
- "Mienai Chikara ~Invisible one~" was the first ending theme to the anime Hell Teacher Nube.
- "Ichibu to Zenbu" was used as the theme song for the Fuji TV 2009 drama Buzzer Beat starring Yamashita Tomohisa and Keiko Kitagawa.
- "Signal" and "Utsukushiki Sekai" were used as the opening theme and the ending theme respectively for the 2002 female-oriented dating sim video game Tokimeki Memorial Girl's Side.
- "Wolf" was used as the ending theme for the Japanese TV show Suits.
