= B'z The Best XXV 1988–1998 =

Compilation album by B'z
- Released: June 12, 2013
- Genre: Pop rock, hard rock
- Label: Vermillion Records
- Producer: Tak Matsumoto

B'z chronology
B'z The Best "Ultra Treasure" (2008)	B'z The Best XXV 1988–1998 (2013)

B'z The Best XXV 1988–1998 is a compilation album by the Japanese hard rock duo B'z. It was released on June 12, 2013, simultaneously with B'z The Best XXV 1999–2012, and it is part of their 25th anniversary celebration. It reached #1 on the Oricon charts and Billboard Japan Top Albums.

The album's tracklist is composed of singles released by the band between 1988 and 1998 with two previously unreleased tracks: "Heat", a collaborative song with the South Korean pop singer Kim Hyun-joong, who once named B'z as his favorite Japanese musical act, and Kakushin, which is used as the opening theme of NTV's drama Kumo no Kaidan (雲の階段).

A special edition copy of the album is also available. It includes a bonus DVD with all of the band's music videos for their first decade, most of which are available on DVD for the first time.

== Track listing ==
=== Disc 1 ===
1. "Dakara Sono Te o Hanashite" (だからその手を離して) - 3:49
2. "Kimi no Naka de Odoritai" (君の中で踊りたい) - 3:46
3. "Lady-Go-Round" - 4:22
4. "Be There" - 4:14
5. "Taiyō no Komachi Angel" (太陽の Komachi Angel) - 4:10
6. "Easy Come, Easy Go!" - 4:40
7. "Itoshii Hitoyo Good Night… " (愛しい人よ Good Night...) - 6:13
8. "Lady Navigation" - 6:09
9. "Alone" - 6:21
10. "Blowin'" - 3:56
11. "Zero"
12. "Ai no mama ni Wagamama ni Boku wa Kimi dake o Kizutsukenai" (愛のままにわがままに 僕は君だけを傷つけない) - 3:56
13. "Hadashi no Megami" (裸足の女神) - 4:27
14. "Don't Leave Me"

=== Disc 2 ===
1. "Motel" - 4:23
2. "Negai" (ねがい) - 3:30
3. "Love Me, I Love You" - 3:18
4. "Love Phantom" - 4:40
5. "Mienai Chikara ～Invisible One～" (ミエナイチカラ ～Invisible one～) - 4:29
6. "Move" - 3:47
7. "Real Thing Shakes" - 4:11
8. "Fireball" - 4:14
9. "Calling" - 5:56
10. "Liar! Liar!" - 3:21
11. "Samayoeru Aoi Dangan" (さまよえる蒼い弾丸) - 4:07
12. "Home" - 4:20
13. "Heat" (Kim Hyun-joong cover)
14. "Kakushin" (核心)

== Certifications ==
Region	Certification	Certified units/sales
Japan (RIAJ)	2× Platinum	500,000^{^}
^{^} Shipments figures based on certification alone.
