= B'z Live-Gym Pleasure 2013 Endless Summer -XXV BEST- =

Video by B'z
- Released: January 29, 2014
- Genre: Hard rock
- Producer: Tak Matsumoto

B'z chronology
B'z Live-Gym 2001 -Eleven- (2013)	B'z Live-Gym Pleasure 2013 Endless Summer -XXV BEST- (2014)

B'z Live-Gym Pleasure 2013 Endless Summer -XXV BEST- is the twenty-fifth live DVD and Blu-ray released by Japanese rock duo B'z, on January 29, 2014. Two version, complete version and standard version, were released. The video sold more than 158,000 copies.

In the standard version, the movie was filmed at the International Stadium Yokohama (Nissan Stadium) on September 22, 2013, the final of the tour. In the complete version, besides performance at Nissan Stadium, it also consists of the performance at Aizu, Hukushima on July 31, 2013, the final of the hall tour.

== Track listing ==
- Tour Final Nissan Stadium Performance(Complete version & Standard version)

Opening: Overture

1. "Endless Summer"
2. "Zero"
3. "Pleasure 2013 ~Jinsei no Kairaku~"(Pleasure 2013 ～人生の快楽～)
4. "Lady Navigation
5. "Taiyou no Komachi Angel"(太陽のKomachi Angel)
6. "Negai"(ねがい)
7. "Sayonara Nanka ha Iwasenai"(さよならなんかは言わせない）
8. "Gold"
9. "C'mon"
10. "Rain"
11. "Kakushin"（核心）
12. "Aikawarazu na Bokura"（あいかわらずなボクら）
13. "Ai no Bakudan"（愛のバクダン）
14. "Ichibu to Zenbu"（イチブトゼンブ）
15. "Love Phantom"
16. "Q & A"
17. "Native Dance"
18. "Samayoeru Aoi Dangan"（さまよえる蒼い弾丸）
19. "Giri Giri Chop"（ギリギリchop）
20. "Run"
21. "Juice""
22. "Ultra Soul"
- Hall Tour Final Performance & Tour Documentary(Complete version only)
1. "Q & A"
2. "F･E･A･R"
3. "Lady Navigation"
4. "STAY GREEN ~Mijyuku na Tabi wa Tomaranai~"(STAY GREEN ～未熟な旅は止まらない～)
5. "Yumemigaoka"(夢見が丘)
6. "Utopia"(ユートピア)
7. "KOI-GOKORO"(恋心）
8. "Happiness"(ハピネス)
9. "Survive
10. "Gold"
11. "Rain"
12. "The Wild Wind"
13. "Dead End"（デッドエンド）
14. "Perfect Life"（パーフェクトライフ）
15. "Native Dance"
16. "Oh! Girl"
17. "Giri Giri Chop"（ギリギリchop）
18. "Ichibu to Zenbu"（イチブトゼンブ）
19. "Alone"
20. "Bad Communication"

== Certifications ==
Region	Certification	Certified units/sales
Japan (RIAJ)	Gold	100,000^{^}
^{^} Shipments figures based on certification alone.

== Personnel ==
- Tak Matsumoto - guitars, production
- Koshi Inaba - vocals, blues harp
- Barry Sparks - bass guitar
- Takanobu Masuda - keyboards
- Shane Gaalaas - drums
- Yoshinobu Ohga - guitars
