= The Complete B'z =

Compilation album by B'z
- Released: August 1, 2005
- Genre: Hard rock
- Label: Vermillion Records
- Producer: Tak Matsumoto

B'z chronology
The Ballads: Love & B'z (2002)	The Complete B'z (2005)	B'z The Best "Pleasure II" (2005)

The Complete B'z is a digital box set by the Japanese rock group B'z that includes all of their albums up to the time of its release on August 1, 2005.

It is only available as a digital download from Apple Inc.'s Japanese iTunes Music Store and is not available outside Japan.

== Content ==
- All studio albums from B'z to The Circle.
- All singles from "Dakara Sono Te wo Hanashite" to "Ocean".
- All EPs from Bad Communication to Friends II.
- Compilations: B'z The Best "Pleasure", B'z The Best "Treasure", B'z The "Mixture", The Ballads ~Love & B'z~.
