= B'z Live-Gym Pleasure 2008: Glory Days =

B'z Live-Gym Pleasure 2008 -Glory Days-

Video by B'z
- Released: February 25, 2009
- Genre: Hard rock
- Length: 2:45:00
- Label: Vermillion Records
- Producer: Tak Matsumoto

B'z chronology
| B'z Live-Gym Hidden Pleasure: Typhoon No.20 (2008) | B'z Live-Gym Pleasure 2008 -Glory Days- (2009) | B'z Live-Gym 2010 "Ain't No Magic" at Tokyo Dome (2010) |

B'z Live-Gym Pleasure 2008 -Glory Days- is the nineteenth live DVD released by Japanese rock duo B'z, on February 25, 2009.

== Track listing ==
1. BAD COMMUNICATION
2. ultra soul
3. Hadashi no Megami
4. Blowin'
5. Negai
6. Konya Tsuki no Mieru Oka ni
7. Mou Ichido Kiss Shitakatta
8. KOI-GOKORO
9. Kodoku no Runaway
10. Don't Leave Me
11. Ocean
12. NATIVE DANCE
13. Oh! Darling
14. Dakara Sono Te wo Hanashite
15. Itsuka Mata Kokode
16. ONE
17. Love Phantom
18. Zero
19. Juice
20. Ai no Bakudan
21. Banzai
22. Brotherhood
23. Giri Giri Chop
24. Glory Days
25. RUN
26. Pleasure 2008 -Jinsei no Kairaku-

== Certifications ==
| Region | Certification | Certified units/sales |
|---|---|---|
| Japan (RIAJ) | Gold | 100,000^{^} |
^{^} Shipments figures based on certification alone.

== Personnel ==
- Takahiro Matsumoto - producer, guitar
- Koshi Inaba - vocalist
