= B'z The Best "Pleasure" =

Compilation album by B'z
- Released: May 20, 1998
- Genre: Hard rock
- Length: 64:17
- Language: Japanese; English
- Label: Rooms
- Producer: Tak Matsumoto

B'z chronology
| B'z TV Style II Songless version (1995) | B'z The Best "Pleasure" (1998) | B'z The Best "Treasure" (1998) |

B'z The Best "Pleasure" is the third compilation album by the Japanese rock duo B'z and released in 1998. It includes many of the group's hit singles from 1989 to 1998. With the exception of "Be There" and "Bad Communication E.Style", all the songs were number-one hits on the Oricon Singles Chart.

The album reached number one on the Oricon Albums Chart with more than 2.7 million copies sold in its first week, and topped the charts for three further weeks. It sold more than 5 million copies in 1998 alone, making it the best-selling album in Japanese music history during its release, until being surpassed by Hikaru Utada's First Love in 1999.

Both it and its companion album, B'z The Best "Treasure", were released by the band in response to their former label BMG Japan releasing its own compilation album called Flash Back – B'z Early Special Titles the previous year. That album, which consisted of music from their early career that neither they nor Vermillion had the rights to, was disavowed by both Inaba and Matsumoto, and they do not consider it an official part of their discography.

== Track listing ==
1. "Love Phantom" – 4:39
2. "Love Me, I Love You" – 3:20
3. "Easy Come, Easy Go!" – 4:40
4. "Zero" – 4:50
5. "Alone" – 6:00
6. "Hadashi no Megami" (裸足の女神) – 4:26
7. "Ai no mama ni Wagamama ni Boku wa Kimi dake wo Kizutsukenai" (愛のままにわがままに 僕は君だけを傷つけない) – 3:56
8. "Lady Navigation" – 4:20
9. "Taiyo no Komachi Angel" (太陽のKomachi Angel) – 4:10
10. "Be There" – 4:13
11. "Don't Leave Me" – 4:24
12. "Bad Communication E.Style" – 4:19
13. "Calling" – 5:56
14. "Samayoeru Aoi Dangan" (さまよえる蒼い弾丸) – 4:05

Tracks 1, 2, 12 from the album Loose. Track 3 from Risky. Track 4 from Run. Track 5 from In the Life. Tracks 8, 11 from The 7th Blues. Track 12 from Wicked Beat. Track 13 from Survive.

== Certifications ==
| Region | Certification | Certified units/sales |
|---|---|---|
| Japan (RIAJ) | 5× Million | 5,000,000^{^} |
^{^} Shipments figures based on certification alone.
