= Epic Day =

Studio album by B'z
- Released: March 4, 2015
- Recorded: 2012–2015
- Genre: Hard rock; pop rock
- Length: 43:19
- Label: Vermillion Records
- Producer: Tak Matsumoto

B'z chronology
C'mon (2011)	Epic Day (2015)	Dinosaur (2017)

Singles from Epic Day
- 1. "Uchōten" Released: January 14, 2015

Epic Day is the nineteenth studio album by the Japanese rock duo B'z. It was released on March 4, 2015, more than 3.5 years after their previous studio effort, C'mon, their longest gap between studio albums. It came after a hiatus in which the members released solo projects, including vocalist/lyricist Koshi Inaba's Singing Bird and guitarist/composer Tak Matsumoto's New Horizon.

It debuted at No. 1 at both the Oricon weekly albums chart and the Billboard Japan album chart.

The album comes in four versions: the regular edition with the 10-track CD; the analog edition with a download card; the limited edition with a bonus live DVD; and the Live-Gym 2015 Edition with live goods.

It was the first time that a B'z album had been released in the vinyl format since the band's early days.

The opening track "Las Vegas" received a promotional video and will be used as the official song of the Japanese leg of the 2015 Red Bull Air Race World Championship season.

== Track listing ==
All lyrics are written by Koshi Inaba; all music is composed by Tak Matsumoto, all songs co-arranged by both.

No.	Title	Length
1.	"Las Vegas"	4:05
2.	"Uchōten (Ecstatic 有頂天)"	4:03
3.	"Exit to the Sun"	4:55
4.	"No Excuse"	4:03
5.	"アマリニモ (Amarinimo)"	4:30
6.	"Epic Day"	4:46
7.	"Classmate"	4:30
8.	"Black Coffee"	3:43
9.	"君を気にしない日など (Kimi wo Kinishinai Hi Nado)"	4:31
10.	"Man of the Match"	4:13
Total length:		43:19

=== Bonus Live DVD ===
B’z LIVE-GYM 2012 -Into Free Extra- at Osaka-jō Hall

1. "Love Bomb"
2. "Go for It, Baby (Kioku no Sanmyaku)"
3. "Ultra Soul"
4. "Splash!"
5. "Brighter Day"
6. "Easy Come, Easy Go!"
7. "Motel"
8. "Mou Ichido Kiss Shitakatta"
9. "Itoshii Hitoyo Good Night..."
10. "Zero"
11. "Mienai Chikara ~Invisible One~"
12. "Negai"
13. "Into Free -Dangan-"
14. "Juice"
15. "It's Showtime!!"
16. "Shōdō"
17. "Home"
18. "Heat"
19. "Blowin'"

== Personnel ==
B'z

- Koshi Inaba – vocals
- Tak Matsumoto – guitars

Session members

- Barry Sparks – bass
- Chiharu Mikuzuki – bass on "Classmate"
- Akira Onozuka – piano, organ on "Amarinimo"
- Takanobu Masuda – organ on "Epic Day"
- Shane Gaalaas – drums
- Hideo Yamaki – drums on "Classmate"
- Kazuki Katsuta – saxophone on "Las Vegas"
- Shiro Sasaki and Toyama Takushi – trumpet on "Las Vegas"
- Makoto Igarashi – trombone on "Las Vegas"
- Atsushi Doyama – horn on "Classmate"
- 小瀧綾 – oboe on "Classmate"
- Hiroko Ishikawa – strings on "Exit to the Sun" and "Classmate"
- Maiko Sugiyama – strings on "Kimi wo Kinishinai Hi Nado"
- Lime Ladies Orchestra – strings on "Exit to the Sun", "Classmate" and "Kimi wo Kinishinai Hi Nado"
- Yoshinobu Ohga – arrangements on all tracks except "Exit to the Sun", "Classmate" and "Kimi wo Kinishinai Hi Nado"
- Hideyuki Terachi – arrangements on tracks 1, 2, 3, 7 and 9

== Certifications ==
Region	Certification	Certified units/sales
Japan (RIAJ)	Platinum	250,000^{^}
^{^} Shipments figures based on certification alone.
