= Dinosaur (B'z album) =

Studio album by B'z
- Released: 29 November 2017
- Genre: Hard rock; pop rock
- Length: 54:17
- Label: Vermillion Records
- Producer: Tak Matsumoto

B'z chronology
Epic Day (2015)	Dinosaur (2017)	New Love (2019)

Singles from Dinosaur
- 1. "Seimei/Still Alive" Released: June 14, 2017

Dinosaur is the twentieth studio album by the Japanese rock duo B'z. It was released on 29 November 2017. It came after a hiatus in which the members released solo projects, including vocalist/lyricist Koshi Inaba's collaborative album with Stevie Salas, Chubby Groove, and guitarist/composer Tak Matsumoto's solo effort enigma and collaborative studio album with Daniel Ho Electric Island, Acoustic Sea.

It debuted at No. 1 at the Oricon weekly albums chart, the Billboard Japan album chart and the Billboard Japan Download Albums chart. By the end of the year, it appeared at No. 18 at the Oricon 2017 year-end chart.

The title track was featured at the Japanese dub of 2017 natural disaster film Geostorm. "King of the Street" was featured in Koei video game, Dynasty Warriors 9's soundtrack.

== Track listing ==
All lyrics are written by Koshi Inaba; all music is composed by Tak Matsumoto, all songs co-arranged by both.

No.	Title	Length
1.	"Dinosaur"	5:11
2.	"Champ"	3:36
3.	"Still Alive"	4:41
4.	"ハルカ (Haruka)"	3:38
5.	"それでもやっぱり (Sore Demo Yappari)" (But, Still)	5:15
6.	"声明 (Seimei)" (Declaration)	3:38
7.	"Queen of the Night"	3:22
8.	"Skyrocket"	3:34
9.	"ルーフトップ (Rooftop)"	3:53
10.	"弱い男 (Yowai Otoko)" (Weak Man)	4:07
11.	"愛しき幽霊 (Itoshiki Yuurei)" (Beloved Ghost)	4:47
12.	"King of the Street"	3:39
13.	"Purple Pink Orange"	4:56
Total length:		54:17

=== Bonus Live CD & DVD / CD & Blu-ray ===
This bonus CD features the band's whole show at Rock in Japan Festival 2017

1. "Samayoeru Aoi Dangan"
2. "Liar! Liar!"
3. "Sayonara Kizu Darake no Hibi yo"
4. "Uchōten"
5. "Hadashi no Megami"
6. "Ichibu to Zenbu"
7. "Still Alive"
8. "Shoudou"
9. "juice"
10. "Giri Giri Chop"
11. "Ultra Soul"

== Personnel ==
B'z

- Koshi Inaba – vocals
- Tak Matsumoto – guitars

Session members

- Yukihide "YT" Takiyama – backing vocals on tracks 7, 8, 10, 12
- Sam Pomanti – backing vocals on "Skyrocket" and "Rooftop"
- Barry Sparks – bass on tracks 1, 5, 8, 9, 10, 11, 12, 13
- Chris Chaney – bass on tracks 1, 2, 6
- Steve Billman – bass on "Haruka" and "Queen of the Night"
- Travis Carlton – bass "Still Alive"
- Jeff Babko – keyboards on all tracks except "Still Alive"
- Shane Gaalaas – drums on tracks 3, 4, 5, 7, 10, 11, 13
- Tommy Clufetos – drums on tracks 1, 2, 6, 8, 9, 12
- Nobu Saito – percussion on tracks 4, 5, 7, 8, 11, 12, 13
- Lenny Castro – percussion on tracks 1, 2, 6
- Greg Vail – saxophone on "Yowai Otoko"

Production

- Yukihide "YT" Takiyama – arrangement and recording on all tracks except "Still Alive"
- Hideyuki Terachi – arrangement and vocal direction on "Still Alive"
- Hiroyuki Kobayashi – recording and mixing

== Charts ==
=== Weekly charts ===
Chart (2017)	Peak position
Japanese Albums (Oricon)	1

=== Year-end charts ===
Chart (2018)	Position
Japanese Albums (Oricon)	18

== Certifications ==
Region	Certification	Certified units/sales
Japan (RIAJ)	Platinum	240,846
