= Live Ripper =

Video by B'z
- Released: December 9, 1993 - VHS March 14, 2001 - DVD
- Recorded: 1992
- Genre: Hard rock
- Length: 1:30:00
- Label: BMG Japan
- Producer: Tak Matsumoto

B'z chronology
Just Another Life (1991)	Live Ripper (1993)	"Buzz!!" The Movie (1996)

Live Ripper is the second live VHS released by Japanese rock duo B'z, and documents a show during the tour supporting their 1992 album RUN. It was later released on DVD, on March 14, 2001.

Live Ripper marks the first performance of Jap the Ripper, a song that would appear on the band's next album, The 7th Blues.

== Track listing ==
1. Introduction -Sayonara Nankawa Iwasenai- (Introduction -さよならなんかは言わせない-)
2. Jap The Ripper
3. Zero
4. Native Dance
5. Time
6. Stay Tonight
7. Gekkou (月光)
8. Wanna Go Home
9. Gimme Your Love
10. Kairaku No Heya (快楽の部屋)
11. Hadashi No Megami (裸足の女神)
12. Blowin'
13. Run
14. One For The Road
15. Sayonara Nankawa Iwasenai (さよならなんかは言わせない)
