= The 7th Blues =

Studio album by B'z
- Released: March 2, 1994
- Recorded: 1993–1994
- Genre: Blues rock; pop rock
- Length: 102:51
- Label: BMG Rooms/ZEZ
- Producer: Tak Matsumoto

B'z chronology
Run (1992)	The 7th Blues (1994)	Loose (1995)

Singles from The 7th Blues
- 1. "Don't Leave Me" Released: February 9, 1994

The 7th Blues is the seventh album released by Japanese hard rock band B'z, released on March 2, 1994.

== Album information ==
The 7th Blues was released as a double album in March 1994 after their successful "PLEASURE LIVE-GYM '93 - JAP THE RIPPER" tour. This album was to fully cement B'z evolution from synthesizer-driven pop to mainstream rock. The experimentation is also of note, as it follows the familiar pattern of excess that so frequently comes with most double albums in the rock and roll genre, most notably Fleetwood Mac's "Tusk", although nowhere nearly as wild or juxtaposed as Lindsay Buckingham's studio work on said album.

The First disc contains a more rock style that B'z built their career on. Notable tracks include "LOVE IS DEAD," which is very jazz oriented; "Strings of My Soul", an instrumental song that Tak performed during previous Live-Gyms, and "Akai Kawa", which features a lengthy string and keyboard introduction.

The Second disc bases itself more on blues songs. Notable songs include "Jap the Ripper", a previously unreleased song that was played during the aforementioned tour; "Slave to the Night", a re-recording of "Heart wo Nureru Number" from the band's debut album, comprising new English lyrics with an extended intro; "Lady Navigation", a bluesy acoustic version of the 1991 single with all English lyrics. Rounding out the balance of the album is "Mou Karimakka", a Kansai Blues-inspired track written in Kansai dialect, reflecting Tak's hometown of Osaka.

B'z took the time to experiment with several sounds, and draw upon their influences, including Aerosmith (Kohshi's vocal style is very reminiscent to Steven Tyler in "Don't Leave Me"), The Beatles (heard most directly in "farewell song"), Eric Clapton (The Leslie effected riff for "Queen of Madrid"), Led Zeppelin (most notably in Tak's homage to "Heartbreaker" in the bridge), Jimi Hendrix (intro riff to "SLAVE TO THE NIGHT"), and Van Halen (The intro riff to "JAP THE RIPPER"). Tak's eclectic studio session background, and his musical influences of blues, classical, jazz, pop, and rock are very apparent in the arrangement as well.

The catalog code for this album is BMCR-6601-2.

The logo featured in the middle of the album cover resembles the logo that Aerosmith has been using in their album covers.

The album broke the million copies mark with over 1,049,900 copies sold in its first week and eventually sold over 1,630,450 copies in total.

The 7th Blues would be the last album to be released on the BMG Rooms label. B Zone exercised its option to purchase BMG's stake in the label.

== Track listing ==
=== Disc 1 ===
1. "LOVE IS DEAD" - 6:19
2. "おでかけしましょ" [Odekake Shimashou] - 3:27
3. "未成年" [Miseinen] - 4:34
4. "闇の雨" [Yami No Ame] - 4:48
5. "MY SAD LOVE" - 3:58
6. "Queen of Madrid" - 4:50
7. "ヒミツなふたり" [Himitsu Na Futari] - 4:02
8. "Strings of My Soul" - 5:52
9. "赤い河" [Akai Kawa] - 6:21
10. "WILD ROAD" - 4:20

=== Disc 2 ===
1. "Don't Leave Me" - 4:23
2. "Sweet Lil' Devil" - 6:13
3. "THE BORDER" - 4:50
4. "JAP THE RIPPER" - 5:51
5. "SLAVE TO THE NIGHT" - 5:08
6. "春" [Haru] - 5:39
7. "破れぬ夢をひきずって" [Yaburenu Yume Wo Hikizutte] - 6:27
8. "LADY NAVIGATION" - 6:09
9. "もうかりまっか" [Mou Kari Makka] - 3:17
10. "farewell song" - 6:23

== Personnel ==
- Tak Matsumoto (guitar)
- Koshi Inaba (vocals)
- Masao Akashi (bass)
- Jun Aoyama (drums)
- Masayuki Nomura (engineer)
- Akira Onozuka (organ, piano, Fender Rhodes)
- Takanobu Masuda (organ)
- Ryoichi Terashima (voice direction)
- Katsunori Hatakeyama (guitar tech)

== Certifications ==
Region	Certification	Certified units/sales
Japan (RIAJ)	4× Platinum	800,000^{^}
^{^} Shipments figures based on certification alone.
