= B'z The Best "Treasure" =

Compilation album by B'z
- Released: September 20, 1998
- Genre: Hard rock
- Length: 64:17
- Language: Japanese, English
- Label: Rooms Records
- Producer: Tak Matsumoto

B'z chronology
B'z The Best "Pleasure" (1998)	B'z The Best "Treasure" (1998)	B'z The "Mixture" (2000)

B'z The Best "Treasure" is the fourth compilation album by the Japanese rock duo B'z. It includes many of their hit singles from 1990 to that date: all 14 songs are #1 hits.

A poll of B'z fans selected the song on the album.

The album reached 1st on Oricon with over 2.5 million copies sold in its first week and topped the charts for over two weeks. It has sold more than 4.4 million copies to date, making it the fifth best-selling album in Japanese music history.

== Track listing ==
1. Blowin' - 3:55
2. Koi-Gokoro - 3:49
3. Time - 4:57
4. Liar! Liar! - 3:23
5. Negai (ねがい) - 3:29
6. Itoshii Hitoyo Good Night... (愛しい人よGood Night...) - 6:15
7. Pleasure'98 -Jinsei no Kairaku- (Pleasure'98 ~人生の快楽~) - 4:44
8. Mienai Chikara -Invisible One- (ミエナイチカラ -Invisible One-) - 4:41
9. Mou Ichidou Kiss Shitakatta (もう一度キスしたかった) - 4:39
10. Fireball - 4:14
11. Real Thing Shakes - 4:14
12. Motel - 4:23
13. Itsuka no Meriikurisumasu (いつかのメリークリスマス Merry Christmas) - 5:38
14. RUN -1998 style- - 5:49

Tracks 4, 10 from the album Survive. Track 5 from the album Loose. Track 6 from the album Risky.

== Certifications ==
Region	Certification	Certified units/sales
Japan (RIAJ)	4× Million	4,000,000^{^}
^{^} Shipments figures based on certification alone.
