= B'z TV Style II Songless version =

Compilation album by B'z
- Released: December 20, 1995
- Genre: Hard rock
- Label: Rooms Records
- Producer: Tak Matsumoto

B'z chronology
B'z TV Style Songless version (1992)	B'z TV Style II Songless version (1995)	B'z The Best "Pleasure" (1998)

B'z TV Style II Songless version is the second compilation album by the Japanese rock duo B'z. It is another karaoke compilation with instrumentals only. The album sold 109,280 copies in total, reaching #17 at Oricon.

== Track listing ==
1. Blowin'
2. Zero
3. Koi-Gokoro
4. Time
5. Ai no mama ni waga mama ni boku wa kimi dake wo kizutsukenai (愛のままにわがままに 僕は君だけを傷つけない)
6. Mou Ichidou Kiss Shitakatta (もう一度キスしたかった )
7. Wonderful Opportunity
8. Gimme Your Love -fukutsu no Love Driver- (Gimme Your Love -不屈のLove Driver- )
9. Hadashi no megami (裸足の女神)
10. Don't Leave Me
11. Motel
12. Negai (ねがい)
13. Love Me, I Love You
14. Love Phantom
15. Itsuka no Meriikurisumasu (いつかのメリークリスマス)
