= A Beautiful Reel. B'z Live-Gym 2002 Green: Go Fight Win =

a Beautiful Reel. B'z Live-Gym 2002 Green ~Go★Fight★Win~

Video by B'z
- Released: November 27, 2002
- Genre: Hard rock
- Length: 3:00:00
- Label: B-Vision
- Producer: Tak Matsumoto

B'z chronology
Once Upon a Time in Yokohama ~B'z Live Gym'99 "Brotherhood"~ (2000)	a Beautiful Reel. B'z Live-Gym 2002 Green ~Go★Fight★Win~ (2002)	Typhoon No.15 ~B'z Live-Gym The Final Pleasure "It's Showtime!!" in Nagisaen~ (2004)

a Beautiful Reel. B'z Live-Gym 2002 Green ~Go★Fight★Win~ is the fifth live VHS/DVD released by Japanese rock duo B'z. It features live footage of the Green Live Gym Tour, one of their famous Live Gym Tours.

== Track listing ==
1. Go★Fight★Win
2. Stay Green ~Mijyuku na Tabi wa Tomaranai~ (Stay Green ~未熟な旅はとまらない~)
3. Zero
4. Love Me, I Love You
5. Warp
6. Surfin' 3000GTR
7. Blue Sunshine
8. Koi-Uta (恋歌)(Tak Matsumoto's song from his solo album Hana)
9. Koi-Gokoro
10. Hadashi No Megami (裸足の女神)
11. Devil
12. Everlasting
13. Fireball
14. Liar! Liar!
15. Samayoeru Aoi Dangan (さまよえる蒼い弾丸)
16. Giri Giri Chop (ギリギリ Chop)
17. Ultra Soul
18. Atsuki Kodou no Hate (熱き鼓動の果て)
19. Juice
