= In the Life (album) =

Studio album by B'z
- Released: November 27, 1991
- Recorded: 1991
- Genre: Pop rock; hard rock
- Length: 47:25
- Label: BMG Victor/ZEZ
- Producer: Tak Matsumoto

B'z chronology
Risky (1990)	In the Life (1991)	Run (1992)

Singles from In The Life
- 1. "Alone" Released: October 10, 1991

In the Life is the fifth studio album by Japanese rock duo B'z. The album debuted with 1,043,070 copies sold and 2,402,970 copies in total.

This album features a harder sound than its predecessors. Although synthesizers are still a large part of the band's sound, Tak's guitar starts to gain more presence.

Only one single was released, the power ballad "Alone."

== Track listing ==
All lyrics are written by Koshi Inaba; all music is composed by Tak Matsumoto

No.	Title	Length
1.	"Wonderful Opportunity"	4:37
2.	"Tonight (Is The Night)"	4:52
3.	"『快楽の部屋』" ("Pleasure Room")	4:53
4.	"憂いのGypsy" (Sorrowful Gypsy)	6:40
5.	"Crazy Rendezvous"	4:21
6.	"もう一度キスしたかった" (Wanted to Kiss You One More Time)	4:37
7.	"Wild Life"	4:27
8.	"それでも君には戻れない" (I Still Can't Go Back to You)	4:43
9.	"あいかわらずなボクら" (We're the Same as Ever)	1:41
10.	"Alone"	6:21
Total length:		47:25

== Certifications ==
Region	Certification	Certified units/sales
Japan (RIAJ)	2× Million	2,000,000^{^}
^{^} Shipments figures based on certification alone.
