= Typhoon No.15 ~B'z Live-Gym The Final Pleasure "It's Showtime!!" in Nagisaen~ =

Video by B'z
- Released: February 25, 2004
- Genre: Hard rock
- Length: 3:50:00
- Label: B-Vision
- Producer: Tak Matsumoto

B'z chronology
a Beautiful Reel. B'z Live-Gym 2002 Green ~Go★Fight★Win~ (2002)	Typhoon No.15 ~B'z Live-Gym The Final Pleasure "It's Showtime!!" in Nagisaen~ (2004)	B'z Live-Gym 2006 "Monster's Garage" (2006)

Typhoon No.15 ~B'z Live-Gym The Final Pleasure "It's Showtime!!" in Nagisaen~ is the fifth live VHS/DVD released by Japanese rock duo B'z. It is a triple DVD which features live footage of one of their famous Live Gym Tours.

== Track listing ==
=== Disc One ===
1. Arakure (アラクレ)
2. Pleasure 2003 ~Jinsei no Kairaku~ (Pleasure 2003 ~人生の快楽~)
3. Blowin'
4. Oh! Girl
5. Wonderful Opportunity
6. Yasei no Energy (野性のEnergy)
7. Time
8. Taiyou no Komachi Angel (太陽のKomachi Angel)
9. Gimme Your Love -Fukutsu no Love Driver- (Gimme Your Love -不屈のLove Driver- )
10. Konya Tsuki no Mieru Oka ni (今夜月の見える丘に)
11. Brotherhood
12. Easy Come, Easy Go!
13. Gekkou (月光)
14. Koi-Gokoro

=== Disc Two ===
1. Real Thing Shakes
2. Love Phantom
3. Zero
4. Juice
5. Ultra Soul
6. It's Showtime!!
7. Bad Communication
8. Ai no mama ni Wagamama ni Boku wa Kimi dake wo Kizutsukenai (愛のままにわがままに 僕は君だけを傷つけない)
9. Hadashi no megami (裸足の女神)
10. Run

=== Disc Three ===
1. Recording in L.A.
2. It's Showtime!!
3. Live-Gym Rehearsal
4. It's Showcase!!
5. Hall Tour 1
6. Yasei no Energy (野性のEnergy)
7. Hall Tour 2
8. In Nagisaen

== Certifications ==
Region	Certification	Certified units/sales
Japan (RIAJ)	Platinum	250,000^{^}
^{^} Shipments figures based on certification alone.
