= Brotherhood (B'z album) =

Studio album by B'z
- Released: July 14, 1999
- Recorded: 1998–1999
- Studios: Westlake Audio, NRG Studio, Birdman West, Gardenia Studio, Red Way Studio, Cross Bone Lounge
- Genres: Hard rock; pop rock
- Length: 47:11
- Label: Rooms Records
- Producer: Tak Matsumoto

B'z chronology
Survive (1997)	Brotherhood (1999)	Eleven (2000)

Singles from Brotherhood
- 1. "Giri Giri Chop" Released: June 9, 1999

Brotherhood is the tenth studio album by the Japanese rock duo B'z, released on July 14, 1999. "Brotherhood" debuted with over 1,019,270 copies sold and sold over 1,391,850 copies. Brotherhood was the first of only two albums released by Rooms Records and distributed by BMG Japan.

== Track listing ==
1. "F・E・A・R" – 3:45
2. "Giri Giri Chop (Version 51)" (ギリギリchop) – 3:59
3. "Brotherhood" – 5:46
4. "Nagai Ai" (ながい愛) – 5:37
5. "Yume no Youna Hibi" (夢のような日々) – 4:53
6. "Gin no Tsubasa de Tobe" (銀の翼で翔べ) – 3:56
7. "Sono Te de Furete Goran" (その手で触れてごらん) – 3:23
8. "Nagare Yuku Hibi" (流れゆく日々) – 4:54
9. "Skin" – 3:44
10. "Ikasete Okure!" (イカせておくれ！) – 3:23
11. "Shine" – 3:51

== Personnel ==
- Tak Matsumoto – guitar
- Koshi Inaba – vocals, blues harp

Additional personnel

- Akira Onozuka – organ (tracks 5, 8, 11)
- Billy Sheehan – bass (tracks 2, 3, 8, 10, 11)
- Daisuke Ikeda – strings arrangement & brass section (tracks 4, 6, 9)
- Hironori Sawano – trumpet (track 6)
- Kaichi Kurose – drums (tracks 1, 3, 4, 5, 6, 7, 8, 9, 10, 11)
- Katsunori "hakkai" Hatakeyama – guitar technician
- Kazuki Katsuta – saxophone (track 6)
- Pat Torpey – drums (track 2)
- Satoru Suzuki – manipulator
- Shinozaki Strings – strings (tracks 4, 9)
- Shiro Sasaki – trumpet (track 6)
- Showtaro Mitsuzono – bass (tracks 1, 4, 5, 6, 7, 9)

== Charts ==
Weekly chart performance for Brotherhood
Chart (1999)	Peak position
Japanese Albums (Oricon)	1

== Certifications ==
Certifications for Brotherhood
Region	Certification	Certified units/sales
Japan (RIAJ)	3× Platinum	600,000^{^}
^{^} Shipments figures based on certification alone.
