= B'z The Best "Pleasure II" =

Compilation album by B'z
- Released: November 30, 2005
- Genre: Hard rock
- Length: 71:06
- Label: Vermillion Records
- Producer: Tak Matsumoto

B'z chronology
The Complete B'z (2005)	B'z The Best "Pleasure II" (2005)	B'z The Best "Ultra Pleasure" (2008)

B'z The Best "Pleasure II" is the sixth compilation album by the Japanese rock duo B'z. The album sold very well and reached 1st at Oricon, with almost 1.2 million copies sold.

== Track listing ==
1. Ocean
2. Konya Tsuki no mieru Oka ni (今夜月の見える丘に)
3. Ai no Bakudan (愛のバクダン)
4. Ultra Soul
5. Home
6. Itsuka no Meriikurisumasu (いつかのメリークリスマス)
7. Atsuki Kodou no Hate (熱き鼓動の果て)
8. Yasei no Energy (野性のEnergy)
9. It's Showtime!!
10. Juice
11. May
12. Giri Giri chop (ｷﾞﾘｷﾞﾘ Chop)
13. Ring
14. Banzai
15. Arigato
16. Gold

== Certifications ==
Region	Certification	Certified units/sales
Japan (RIAJ)	Million	1,000,000^{^}
^{^} Shipments figures based on certification alone.
