= "Buzz!!" The Movie =

Video by B'z
- Released: January 1, 1996
- Genre: Hard rock
- Length: 1:41:00
- Label: Rooms Records
- Producer: Tak Matsumoto

B'z chronology
Live Ripper (1993)	"Buzz!!" The Movie (1996)	The True Meaning of "Brotherhood"? (1999)

"Buzz!!" The Movie is the third live VHS released by Japanese rock duo B'z. It was later released on DVD, on March 14, 2001. It received the 1996 Music Video of the Year award at the 10th Japan Gold Disc Awards.

The DVD was released at the same time as the single "Ultra Soul" as well as three other works by B'z.

== Performance ==
=== Members ===
- Takahiro Matsumoto: guitar, producer
- Koshi Inaba: vocals

=== Support Members ===
- Masao Akashi: bass
- Takanobu Masuda: keyboard
- Denny Vonheiser: drums

== Track listing ==
1. Blowin'
2. Pleasure'95 -Jinsei no Kairaku- (Pleasure'95 ~人生の快楽~)
3. Oh! Girl
4. Love Me, I Love You
5. Time
6. Taiyou no Komachi Angel (太陽のKomachi Angel)
7. Koi-Gokoro
8. Mou Ichidou Kiss Shitakatta (もう一度キスしたかった)
9. Don't Leave Me
10. Love Phantom
11. Negai (ねがい)
12. Bad Communication
13. Jap The Ripper
14. Zero
15. Alone
16. Hadashi No Megami (裸足の女神)
