= New Love (B'z album) =

Studio album by B'z
- Released: May 29, 2019
- Recorded: 2018–2019
- Genre: Hard rock; blues rock
- Length: 55:16
- Label: Vermillion
- Producer: Tak Matsumoto

B'z chronology
Dinosaur (2017)	New Love (2019)	Highway X (2022)

New Love is the twenty-first studio album by the Japanese rock duo B'z. It was released on May 29, 2019, about a year and a half after their previous album Dinosaur. It is the first B'z album to not have an accompanying single, though music videos were produced for "Tsuwamono, Hashiru", "Wolf", and "Majestic".

The album debuted at number one on the Oricon weekly albums chart and on the Billboard Japan album chart.

The album comes in three editions: A standard CD edition, a vinyl edition, and a limited edition box set featuring the CD with a t-shirt featuring the album art.

"Wolf" was used as the ending theme for the Japanese TV show Suits. "Majestic" was used in a Pocky commercial and "Tsuwamono, Hashiru" was used in commercials for Lipovitan to support the Japan national rugby union team.

== Track listing ==
All lyrics are written by Koshi Inaba; all music is composed by Tak Matsumoto.

No.	Title	Length
1.	"My New Love (マイニューラブ, My New Love)"	3:19
2.	"Tsuwamono, Hashiru (兵、走る, Soldier, Run)"	4:14
3.	"Wolf"	3:51
4.	"Deus (デウス, Deus)"	4:13
5.	"Majestic (マジェスティック, Majestic)"	4:14
6.	"Mr. Armour"	3:23
7.	"Da La Da Da"	4:46
8.	"Koi Karasu (恋鴉, Love Crow)"	3:35
9.	"Rain & Dream"	6:20
10.	"Ore yo Karma wo Ikiro (俺よカルマを生きろ, Living My Karma)"
11.	"Golden Rookie (ゴールデンルーキー, Golden Rookie)"	4:48
12.	"Sick"	4:05
13.	"Towa ni Wakaku (トワニワカク, Forever Young)"	4:18
Total length:		55:16

== Personnel ==
B'z

- Koshi Inaba – vocals, blues harp on "Deus"
- Tak Matsumoto – guitars

Additional musicians

- Joe Perry – guitar on "Rain & Dream"
- Yukihide "YT" Takiyama – backing vocals on "Deus" and "Majestic"
- Sam Pomanti – backing vocals on "Mr. Armour"
- Brian Tichy – drums on tracks 1, 4, 6–8, 10–13
- Shane Gaalaas – drums on "Tsuwamono, Hashiru"
- Tomu Tamada – drums on "Wolf" and "Majestic"
- Brittany Maccarello – drums on "Rain & Dream" and "Golden Rookie"
- Mohini Dey – bass on tracks 1, 4, 8, 12, 13
- Barry Sparks – bass on "Tsuwamono, Hashiru"
- Seiji Kameda – bass on "Wolf" and "Majestic"
- Robert DeLeo – bass on tracks 6, 7, 9–11
- Jeff Babko – keyboards on tracks 3, 4, 8–12
- Lenny Castro – percussion on tracks 1, 4, 6, 8, 11, 12
- Andy Wolf – saxophone on "Wolf"
- Azusa Tojo – trombone
- Kenichiro Naka – trumpet on "Wolf"
- Mika Hashimoto with Lime Ladies Orchestra – strings on "Da La Da Da"

Production

- Yukihide "YT" Takiyama – arrangement
- Hideyuki Teraji – vocal direction on tracks 1, 4, 6–13, strings arrangement on "Da La Da Da"

== Charts ==
=== Weekly charts ===
Chart (2019)	Peak position
Japanese Albums (Oricon)	1
Japanese Albums (Billboard Japan)	1

=== Year-end charts ===
Chart (2019)	Position
Japanese Albums (Oricon)	9
Japanese Albums (Billboard Japan)	8

== Certifications ==
Region	Certification	Certified units/sales
Japan (RIAJ)	Platinum	250,000^{^}
^{^} Shipments figures based on certification alone.
