= Once Upon a Time in Yokohama: B'z Live Gym'99 "Brotherhood" =

Once Upon a Time in Yokohama ~B'z Live Gym'99 "Brotherhood"~

Video by B'z
- Released: August 2, 2000 - VHS March 14, 2001 - DVD
- Genre: Hard rock
- Producer: Tak Matsumoto

B'z chronology
The True Meaning of "Brotherhood"? (1999)	Once Upon a Time in Yokohama ~B'z Live Gym'99 "Brotherhood"~ (2000)	a Beautiful Reel. B'z Live-Gym 2002 Green ~Go★Fight★Win~ (2002)

Once Upon a Time in Yokohama ~B'z Live Gym'99 "Brotherhood"~ is the fourth live VHS released by Japanese rock duo B'z. It was later released on DVD, on March 14, 2001. It features live footage of the Brotherhood Live Gym Tour, one of their famous Live Gym Tours.

It is also the first B'z concert video to include "Live Gym" in the title, although previous releases were officially considered Live Gym shows.

== Track listing ==
1. Giri Giri Chop (ギリギリ Chop)
2. F・E・A・R
3. Liar！ Liar！
4. Home
5. Time
6. Easy Come, Easy Go！
7. Nagai Ai (ながい愛)
8. Gin no Tsubasa de Tobe (銀の翼で翔べ)
9. Skin
10. Shine
11. TookuMade (遠くまで)
12. Go Further
13. Calling
14. Freeway Jam
15. Real Thing Shakes
16. Love Phantom
17. Samayoeru Aoi Dangan (さまよえる蒼い弾丸)
18. Zero
19. One
20. Run
21. Bad Communication
22. Brotherhood
23. Suima-Yo! ~from B'z Live-GYM'98 "Survive"~ (Bonus Track) (スイマーよ！~from B'z Live-GYM'98 "SURVIVE"~(Bonus Track))
