= Friends (B'z album) =

EP by B'z
- Released: December 9, 1992
- Genre: Soft rock
- Length: 26:47
- Label: BMG Rooms/ZEZ
- Producer: Tak Matsumoto

B'z chronology
Mars (1991)	Friends (1992)	Friends II (1996)

Friends is the fourth mini-album by the Japanese rock duo B'z, released in 1992. The album sold 1,355,530 copies and reached No. 1 at Oricon. The track "Itsuka no Merry Christmas" became extremely commercially successful, being certified by the RIAJ as being downloaded 500,000+ times as a ringtone and more than 100,000 times as a full-length cellphone download, despite being released in the early 1990s and not as a single.

== Track listing ==
1. Prologue - Friends 1:48
2. Scene 1 - Itsuka no Merry Christmas (いつかのメリークリスマス) - 5:03
3. Scene 2 - Boku no Tsumi (僕の罪) - 4:19
4. Love is... - 1:26
5. Scene 3 - Koi ja Naku Naru Hi (恋じゃなくなる日) - 4:51
6. Scene 4 - Seasons - 1:14
7. Scene 5 - Dōshitemo Kimi o Ushinaitakunai (どうしても君を失いたくない) - 6:07
8. Itsuka no Merry Christmas (Reprise) (いつかのメリークリスマス (Reprise)) - 1:23

== Certifications ==
Region	Certification	Certified units/sales
Japan (RIAJ)	2× Million	2,000,000^{^}
^{^} Shipments figures based on certification alone.
