= The Ballads: Love & B'z =

The Ballads ~Love & B'z~

Compilation album by B'z
- Released: December 11, 2002
- Genre: Hard rock
- Length: 76:43
- Label: Vermillion Records
- Producer: Tak Matsumoto

B'z chronology
B'z The "Mixture" (2000)	The Ballads ~Love & B'z~ (2002)	The Complete B'z (2005)

The Ballads ~Love & B'z~ is the fifth compilation album by the Japanese rock duo B'z. Like its predecessors, it reached 1st at Oricon, with more than 1.7 million copies sold.

== Track listing ==
1. Itsuka no Meriikurimasu (いつかのメリークリスマス)
2. Alone
3. Konya Tsuki no mieru Oka ni (今夜月の見える丘に)
4. Home
5. Calling
6. Time
7. Kienai niji (消えない虹)
8. Gekko (月光)
9. Hapinasu (Happiness) (ハピネス)
10. Mou ichido Kiss shitakatta (もう一度キスしたかった)
11. Naite naite nakiyandara (泣いて泣いて泣きやんだら)
12. One
13. Everlasting
14. Gold
15. Snow

== Certifications ==
Region	Certification	Certified units/sales
Japan (RIAJ)	4× Platinum	800,000^{^}
^{^} Shipments figures based on certification alone.
