= Wicked Beat =

EP by B'z
- Released: June 21, 1990
- Studios: Studio Birdman (Gray & Brown Room)
- Genres: Pop rock; electronic; new wave
- Length: 23:16
- Language: English
- Labels: Air (original release), Rooms (reissues)
- Producer: Masao Nakajima

B'z chronology
Bad Communication (1989)	Wicked Beat (1990)	Mars (1991)

Wicked Beat is the second mini-album by the Japanese rock duo B'z, released on June 21, 1990. It consists of extended, English versions of previous hits. The album sold 1,111,230 copies in total, eventually being certified Triple Platinum by the RIAJ. It debuted at No. 3 on the Oricon Weekly Albums Chart, being their last album of original material to not debut at No. 1.

== Track listing ==
All lyrics are written by Koshi Inaba; all music is composed by Tak Matsumoto.

Wicked Beat track listing
No.	Title	Length
1.	"I Wanna Dance Wicked Beat Style"	4:36
2.	"Komachi-Angel Red Hot Style"	4:33
3.	"Bad Communication E.Style"	7:20
4.	"Lady-Go-Round "W-40" Style"	6:01
Total length:		23:16

== Personnel ==
Credits are adapted from the liner notes.

B'z

- Koshi Inaba – vocals
- Tak Matsumoto – guitars

Production

- Masao Akashi – production, arrangement
- Masayuki Nomura – mixing
- Yuka Koizumi – mastering engineer
- Yoshiaki Kawakami – assistant engineer

== Charts ==
=== Weekly charts === : Chart (1990) / Peak position; Japanese Albums (Oricon) / 3	=== Year-end charts === : Chart (1990) / Position; Japanese Albums (Oricon) / 21; Chart (1991) / Position; Japanese Albums (Oricon) / 30

== Certifications ==
Region	Certification	Certified units/sales
Japan (RIAJ)	3× Platinum	1,200,000^{^}
^{^} Shipments figures based on certification alone.

== See also ==
- 1990 in Japanese music
