= Highway X =

Studio album by B'z
- Released: August 10, 2022
- Genre: Hard rock
- Length: 46:50
- Label: Vermillion
- Producer: Tak Matsumoto

B'z chronology
New Love (2019)	Highway X (2022)

Singles from Highway X
- 1. "Unite" Released: October 1, 2021; 2. "Sleepless" Released: June 24, 2022

Highway X is the twenty-second studio album by the Japanese rock duo B'z. It was released on August 10, 2022, and was their first album released after the COVID-19 pandemic started.

The album was released in three editions: A standard edition, a first press edition with a DVD and a photo book, and a first production limited edition featuring the DVD and photo book as well as a cassette.

The album debuted at number one on the Oricon weekly albums chart and number two on the Billboard Japan Hot Albums Chart.

== Release and promotion ==
As it was their first album since the COVID-19 pandemic had started, the band said the album presented "the trajectory of two years that have been running through this chaotic era without stopping, and the current state of the present." Unlike other albums, the album was released right before the supporting tour ended, meaning that most of the songs were first heard live.

"Unite" was released as the first digital single on October 1, 2021, where it debuted at number 1 on the Oricon weekly digital singles chart. "Sleepless" was released as the second digital single on June 24, 2022, where it also debuted at number 1 on the Oricon weekly digital singles chart; it was also used as an opening theme in the anime Detective Conan. "Comeback -Itoshiki Hahen-" was used as the theme for the Asahi TV drama Mirai e no 10 Count. "Live" was used in the film Lie Eater.

== Track listing ==
All lyrics are written by Koshi Inaba; all music is composed by Tak Matsumoto.

No.	Title	Length
1.	"Sleepless"	3:39
2.	"Hard Rain Love"	4:18
3.	"Comeback -Itoshiki Hahen- (Comeback -愛しき破片-, Comeback -Dear Pieces-)"	4:29
4.	"Yes Yes Yes"	3:45
5.	"Highway X"	4:56
6.	"Mamirena (マミレナ, Get Stained)"	3:31
7.	"Yamate Doori ni Kaze (山手通りに風, Wind on Yamate-dori)"	3:44
8.	"Live (リヴ, Live)"	3:59
9.	"Daydream"	4:56
10.	"Unite"	5:18
11.	"You Are My Best"	4:15
Total length:		46:50

DVD: B'z Live-Gym 2022 -Highway X-
No.	Title	Length
1.	"Sleepless"
2.	"Hard Rain Love"
3.	"Highway X"
4.	"Comeback -Itoshiki Hahen- (Comeback -愛しき破片-, Comeback -Dear Pieces-)"
5.	"Live (リヴ, Live)"
6.	"You Are My Best"

Cassette

Side 1
No.	Title	Length
1.	"Live (リヴ, Live)" (Movie Size)
2.	"Sleepless" (TV Size)
3.	"Comeback -Itoshiki Hahen- (Comeback -愛しき破片-, Comeback -Dear Pieces-)" (TV Size)

Side 2
No.	Title	Length
1.	"Yes Yes Yes" (Live Ver. from 5 Eras)
2.	"Unite" (Live Ver. from Unite #1)

== Personnel ==
B'z

- Koshi Inaba – vocals
- Tak Matsumoto – guitars, background vocals on "Yes Yes Yes" and "Mamirena"

Additional musicians

- Yukihide "YT" Takiyama – bass on tracks 1, 8, 10
- Rhonda Smith – bass on tracks 2–5, 9
- Takeshi Taneda – bass on tracks 6–7, 11
- Brian Tichy – drums on tracks 1–5, 8–10
- Tom Tamada – drums on tracks 6–7, 11
- Akira Onozuka – piano on tracks 1, 5, 7, 8, 11, organ on tracks 1–2, 4, 7–9, Wurlitzer on "Hard Rain Love" and "Mamirena", Clavinet on "Yes Yes Yes" and "Mamirena", synthesizer on "Mamirena", Mellotron on "Daydream"
- Ken Kawamura – organ, theremin, and synthesizer on "Unite"
- Watanabe Fire – tenor saxophone on "Hard Rain Love" and "Live"
- Takahiro Miyazaki – baritone saxophone on "Hard Rain Love"
- Osamu Ueishi – trumpet on "Hard Rain Love" and "Live"
- Motoko Hasegawa – trumpet on "Hard Rain Love" and "Live"
- Azusa Tojo – trombone on "Hard Rain Love" and "Live"
- Nobu Saito – tambourine on tracks 3–5, 7, 11, reco-reco on "Comeback -Itoshiki Hahen-", conga on "Yes Yes Yes" and "Yamate Doori ni Kaze", cowbell on "Highway X", wind chimes, shaker, and triangle on "Yamate Doori ni Kaze"
- Mai Origami – background vocals on "Yes Yes Yes" and "Unite"
- MissTy – background vocals on "Yes Yes Yes" and "Unite"
- Yuki Asanuma – background vocals on "Yes Yes Yes"
- Michiya Nakahara – background vocals on "Yes Yes Yes"
- Rie Kodera with Lime Ladies Orchestra – strings on "Live" and "You Are My Best"

Production

- Yukihide "YT" Takiyama – arrangement on tracks 1–9, recording
- Yoshinobu Ohga – arrangement on "Unite"
- Hideyuki Terachi – arrangement on "Unite" and "You Are My Best", vocal direction
- Hiroyuki Kobayashi – recording, mixing

B'z Live-Gym 2022 -Highway X- support members

- Yukihide "YT" Takiyama – guitar
- Kiyoshi – bass
- Ken Kawamura – keyboards
- Hideki Aoyama – drums

== Charts ==
=== Weekly charts ===
Chart (2022)	Peak position
Japanese Albums (Oricon)	1
Japanese Hot Albums (Billboard Japan)	2

=== Year-end charts ===
Chart (2022)	Position
Japanese Albums (Oricon)	22
Japanese Albums (Billboard Japan)	25

== Certifications ==
Region	Certification	Certified units/sales
Japan (RIAJ)	Gold	100,000^{^}
^{^} Shipments figures based on certification alone.
