= Mars (B'z album) =

EP by B'z
- Released: May 29, 1991
- Genre: Hard rock
- Length: 23:16
- Label: BMG Victor/ZEZ
- Producer: Tak Matsumoto

B'z chronology
Wicked Beat (1990)	Mars (1991)	Friends (1992)

Mars is the third Mini-Album for the Japanese rock duo B'z, released in 1991. The album sold 1,730,500 copies in total, reaching #1 at Oricon.

== Track listing ==
1. Kodoku no Runaway (孤独のRunaway) - 5:03
2. Mars - 1:24
3. Loving All Night ~Octopus Style~ - 5:50
4. Love & Chain ~Godzilla Style~ - 5:45
5. Lady Navigation ~Cookie & Car Stereo Style~ - 5:12

== Certifications ==
Region	Certification	Certified units/sales
Japan (RIAJ)	4× Platinum	800,000^{^}
^{^} Shipments figures based on certification alone.
