= Just Another Life =

Video by B'z
- Released: December 11, 1991
- Genre: Hard rock
- Length: 60:00
- Label: BMG Japan
- Producer: Tak Matsumoto

B'z chronology
Film Risky (1990)	Just Another Life (1991)	Live Ripper (1993)

Just Another Life is the first live VHS released by Japanese rock duo B'z. It features live footage of the band's early hits.

The concert is the first official "Live Gym" release, although it would take several releases before the "Live Gym" name would be appear.

== Track listing ==
1. Itoshii Hitoyo Good Night... (愛しい人よ Good Night...)
2. Lady Navigation
3. Bad Communication
4. Loving All Nigh
5. Oh! Girl
6. Safety Love
7. Love Ya
8. Dakara Sono te wo Hanashite (だからその手を離して)
9. Taiyou no Komachi Angel (太陽の Komachi Angel)
10. Kodoku no Runaway (孤独の Runaway)
11. Pleasure '91
12. Hot Fashion
13. Easy Come, Easy go!
