= Ai no mama ni Wagamama ni Boku wa Kimi dake o Kizutsukenai =

"Ai no mama ni Wagamama ni Boku wa Kimi dake wo Kizutsukenai"

Single by B'z
- Released: March 17, 1993
- Genre: Hard rock
- Label: BMG Japan
- Songwriters: Koshi Inaba; Tak Matsumoto
- Producer: Tak Matsumoto

B'z singles chronology
| "Zero" (1992) | "Ai no mama ni Wagamama ni Boku wa Kimi dake wo Kizutsukenai" (1993) | "Hadashi no Megami" (1993) |

"Ai no mama ni Wagamama ni Boku wa Kimi dake wo Kizutsukenai" (愛のままにわがままに 僕は君だけを傷つけない; "Even though love is selfish, I will never hurt you") is a song by B'z, released as their twelfth single, on March 17, 1993. This song is one of B'z many number one singles on the Oricon chart. The single was re-released in 2003, and re-entered at #5. The single sold over two-million copies according to Oricon. According to Oricon, the song was their best-selling single in Japan. The song won "the best five single award" at the 8th Japan Gold Disc Award. It was released in the best-of album B'z The Best "Pleasure".

The song was used as the theme song for the 1993 Japanese TV drama adaptation of Saiyūki.

== Track listing ==
1. "Ai no mama ni Wagamama ni Boku wa Kimi dake wo Kizutsukenai" (愛のままにわがままに 僕は君だけを傷つけない)
2. "Joy"

== Certifications ==
| Region | Certification | Certified units/sales |
|---|---|---|
| Japan (RIAJ) | 2× Million | 2,000,000^{^} |
^{^} Shipments figures based on certification alone.
