= Run (B'z album) =

Studio album by B'z
- Released: October 28, 1992
- Recorded: 1992
- Genre: Hard rock; pop rock
- Length: 46:34
- Label: BMG Rooms/ZEZ
- Producer: Tak Matsumoto

B'z chronology
In the Life (1991)	Run (1992)	The 7th Blues (1994)

Singles from Run
- 1. "Zero" Released: October 7, 1992

Run is the sixth studio album by Japanese rock band B'z. Run debuted with 1,190,380 copies sold in its first week and over 2,196,660 copies sold in total.

The album continues the band's change in direction from a synthesizer-heavy band to a more guitar-oriented band. A full horn section replaced the synth brass backing, and electric organ was used more extensively. The resulting sound was not unlike many American bands, particularly Aerosmith, one of lead singer Koshi Inaba's inspirations.

Only one single, "Zero," was released.

== Track listing ==
1. "The Gambler" - 5:27
2. "Zero" - 4:50
3. "Akai Kagerou (紅い陽炎)" - 4:59
4. "Run" - 3:53
5. "Out of Control" - 3:55
6. "Native Dance" - 4:45
7. "Mr. Rolling Thunder" - 4:34
8. "Sayonara Nanka wa Iwasenai (さよならなんかは言わせない)" - 4:29
9. "Gekkou (月光)" - 5:33
10. "Baby, You're My Home" - 4:04

== Certifications ==
Region	Certification	Certified units/sales
Japan (RIAJ)	2× Million	2,000,000^{^}
^{^} Shipments figures based on certification alone.
