= Bad Communication =

EP by B'z
- Released: October 21, 1989
- Studio: Studio Birdman (Brown & Gray Room)
- Genre: Pop rock
- Length: 22:15
- Language: Japanese, English
- Label: Air
- Producer: Masao Nakajima

B'z chronology
Bad Communication (1989)	Wicked Beat (1990)

Bad Communication is the first mini-album by the Japanese rock duo B'z, released in 1989. The album was the first hit album for the band, debuting at number 15. The album also includes the band's first two English versions of previous songs—in this case, "Out of the Rain" and "Dakara Sono Te Wo Hanashite", both from their debut album—arranged as if they were tracks from Off the Lock, dubbed "Off the Lock Style". It peaked at number 12 on the Oricon weekly albums chart in 1991, and by 1993, was certified million by the RIAJ. It was eventually certified 3× platinum, selling over 1,200,000 copies. The song was used in a commercial for Fujitsu's FM Towns computers.

"Bad Communication" has been remade three times: an edited "E-Style" version with English lyrics, which appeared on Wicked Beat and B'z The Best "Pleasure", the "(000-18)" bluesy unplugged version from the album Loose, and one version called "-Ultra Pleasure Style-" as the opening of B'z The Best "Ultra Pleasure".

The song is played very often in concert.

== Writing ==
According to vocalist Koshi Inaba, he wanted the song title to mean "communication that is not half-baked or half-hearted." He also said he wrote the lyrics in a "thankless" manner, hoping people would hear them and think, "Oh, communication is necessary after all".

== Controversy ==
The guitar riff has been noted to be similar to Led Zeppelin's "Trampled Under Foot", which has led to accusations of plagiarism.

== Track listing ==
All lyrics are written by Koshi Inaba; all music is composed by Tak Matsumoto.

No.	Title	Length
1.	"Bad Communication"	7:25
2.	"Out of the Rain" (Off the Lock Style)	7:41
3.	"Da・Ka・Ra・So・No・Te・O・Ha・Na・Shi・Te" (Off the Lock Style)	7:19
Total length:		22:15

== Personnel ==
Credits are adapted from the liner notes.

B'z

- Koshi Inaba – vocals
- Tak Matsumoto – guitars

Additional Musicians

- Ikkies – backing vocals
- Amy – voice

Production

- Masao Akashi – production, programming, arrangement
- Masayuki Nomura – mixing, recording engineer
- Masahiro Shimada – recording engineer
- Hisato Ishi – recording engineer
- Yasuo Sasaki – assistant engineer
- Takayuki Ichikawa – assistant engineer

== Charts ==
=== Weekly charts ===
Chart (1991)	Peak position
Japanese Albums (Oricon)	12

=== Year-end charts ===
Chart (1990)	Position
Japanese Albums (Oricon)	29

Chart (1991)	Position
Japanese Albums (Oricon)	26

Chart (1992)	Position
Japanese Albums (Oricon)	87

== Certifications ==
Region	Certification	Certified units/sales
Japan (RIAJ)	3× Platinum	1,200,000^{^}
^{^} Shipments figures based on certification alone.

== See also ==
- 1989 in Japanese music
