= B'z The "Mixture" =

Remix album by B'z
- Released: February 23, 2000
- Genre: Hard rock
- Length: 66:09
- Label: Berg Label
- Producer: Tak Matsumoto

B'z chronology
| B'z The Best "Treasure" (1998) | B'z The "Mixture" (2000) | The Ballads: Love & B'z (2002) |

B'z The "Mixture" is a compilation album of remastered hits by the Japanese rock duo B'z. The album reached 1st at Oricon, with almost 1.5 million copies sold.

As would become the band's custom, many of the songs on the album are re-recorded versions of earlier songs from their synthesizer-heavy pop music period.

The album features several songs recorded during the band's BMG Japan period, and was jointly distributed by B Zone and BMG, with distribution of the album handled by B Zone while publishing rights remained with BMG Japan.

== Track listing ==
1. "Dakara Sono Te Wo Hanashite -Mixture Style- (だからその手を離して -Mixture style-)"
2. "You&I" -Mixture mix-
3. "Oh! Girl" -Mixture style-
4. "Never Let You Go" -Mixture style-
5. "Joy" -Mixture mix-
6. "Ima de wa...Ima nara...Ima mo..." -Mixture style- (今では...今なら...今も... -Mixture style-)
7. "Kodoku No Runaway" -Mixture Style- (孤独のRunaway -Mixture style-)
8. "Move"
9. "Tokyo" -Mixture Mix- (東京 -Mixture mix-)
10. "Hole In My Heart" -Mixture Mix-
11. "Kara Kara" -Mixture Mix-
12. "Fushidara100%"
13. "Biribiri" -Mixture Mix- (ビリビリ -Mixture mix-)
14. "Hi"
15. "The Wild Wind"
16. "Anata Nara Kamawanai" (あなたならかまわない)

== Certifications ==
| Region | Certification | Certified units/sales |
|---|---|---|
| Japan (RIAJ) | 4× Platinum | 800,000^{^} |
^{^} Shipments figures based on certification alone.
