= Alone (B'z song) =

Single by B'z

from the album In the Life
- Released: October 10, 1991
- Genre: Pop rock; arena rock
- Label: BMG Japan
- Songwriter(s): Koshi Inaba; Tak Matsumoto
- Producer(s): Tak Matsumoto

B'z singles chronology
"Lady Navigation" (1991)	"Alone" (1991)	"Blowin'" (1992)

"Alone" is the ninth single by B'z, released on October 10, 1991. This song is one of B'z many number-one singles on the Oricon chart. The single was re-released in 2003, and re-entered at #8. It sold over 1,127,000 copies according to Oricon. It was used as the drama Hotel Woman's theme song. The song was the 10th best selling single of 1991 and the 56th best selling single of 1992, making their only single to chart for two years in the yearly charts.

In 2011, the song was certified digitally by the RIAJ as a gold single for being downloaded more than 100,000 times to cellphones since its release as a digital download in early 2005.

== Track listing ==
1. "Alone"
2. "Go-Go-Girls"

== Certifications ==
Region	Certification	Certified units/sales
Japan (RIAJ)	Million	1,000,000^{^}
^{^} Shipments figures based on certification alone.
