= Don't Leave Me (B'z song) =

Single by B'z

from the album The 7th Blues
- Released: February 9, 1994
- Genre: Blues-rock; hard rock
- Length: 8:05
- Label: BMG Japan
- Songwriter(s): Koshi Inaba; Tak Matsumoto
- Producer(s): Tak Matsumoto

B'z singles chronology
"Hadashi no Megami" (1993)	"Don't Leave Me" (1994)	"Motel" (1994)

"Don't Leave Me" is the fourteenth single by B'z, released on February 9, 1994. This song is one of B'z many number-one singles on the Oricon chart, selling 800,000 copies in its first week. It sold over 1,444,000 copies according to Oricon. The song won "the best five single award" at the 9th Japan Gold Disc Award.

It was used as the theme song of the drama Shin Kūkō Monogatari.

== Track listing ==
1. "Don't Leave Me" – 4:23
2. "Mannequin Village" – 3:42

== Certifications ==
Region	Certification	Certified units/sales
Japan (RIAJ)	3× Platinum	1,200,000^{^}
^{^} Shipments figures based on certification alone.
