= B'z (album) =

Studio album by B'z
- Released: September 21, 1988
- Recorded: 1988
- Genres: Pop rock, electronic rock
- Length: 39:53
- Label: BMG Victor/Air Records
- Producer: Masao Nakajima

B'z chronology
B'z (1988)	Off the Lock (1989)

Singles from B'z
- 1. "Dakara Sono Te o Hanashite" Released: September 21, 1988

B'z is the debut studio album by the Japanese rock duo B'z. It was released on September 21, 1988, and reached #47 on the Japanese charts. The album sold 3,790 copies in its first week and eventually sold 338,360 in total.

The band did not tour in support of the album, because its nine songs were all the material they had at the time, and they felt it would not be a proper show with just 40 minutes of material. Unlike the hard-rocking music that most associate with B'z, the album was very much a product of its times, with synthesizers and samplers sharing equal time with Matsumoto's guitar.

One single was released from the album, "Dakara Sono Te o Hanashite", which was released on the same day.

Two of the songs on the album are the only ones in the band's catalog not to have been completely written by the band: The lyrics to "Nothing to Change" are written by Tomoko Aran and "Kodoku ni Dance in Vain" is composed by Hiroyuki Otsuki.

== Reception ==
CDJournal noted how the album's sound is different compared to their current style, stating, "Although many of their songs have a strong hard rock flavor, at that time, many of their songs were still danceable, using rhythm machines and other instruments."

== Track listing ==
All lyrics are written by Koshi Inaba, except where noted; all music is composed by Tak Matsumoto, except where noted.

No.	Title	Lyrics	Music	Length
1.	"Dakara Sono Te o Hanashite (だからその手を離して, So Let Go of That Hand)"			3:49
2.	"Half Tone Lady"			3:36
3.	"Heart mo Nureru Number ~Stay Tonight~ (ハートも濡れるナンバー, A Number That Dampens the Heart ~Stay Tonight~)"			4:39
4.	"Yuube no Crying ~This is My Truth~ (ゆうべのCrying ～This is My truth～, Crying Last Night ~This is My Truth~)"			5:30
5.	"Nothing to Change"	Tomoko Aran		4:37
6.	"Kodoku ni Dance in Vain (孤独にDance in vain, Dance in Vain All Alone)"		Hiroyuki Otsuki	4:54
7.	"It's Not a Dream"			3:56
8.	"Kimi o Ima Dakitai (君を今抱きたい, I Want to Hold You Right Now)"			4:13
9.	"Fake Lips"			4:39
Total length:				39:53

== Charts ==
Chart (1988)	Peak position
Japanese Albums (Oricon)	47

== Dakara Sono Te o Hanashite ==
"Dakara Sono Te o Hanashite"

Single by B'z

from the album B'z
- B-side: "Heart mo Nureru Number ~Stay Tonight~"
- Released: September 21, 1988
- Genre: Pop rock, electronic rock
- Length: 8:28
- Label: BMG Victor/Air Records
- Composer: Tak Matsumoto
- Lyricist: Koshi Inaba
- Producer: Masao Nakashima

B'z singles chronology
"Dakara Sono Te o Hanashite" (1988)	"'Kimi no Naka de Odoritai'" (1989)

"Dakara Sono Te o Hanashite" (だからその手を離して; lit. "So, Please Let Go the Hand") is the only single from the album and the debut single by the band, released on September 21, 1988. The song was the last song to be completed for the album, and before it, "Half Tone Lady" was considered to be the single.

The song has been re-recorded twice, first in English for their Bad Communication EP, then as a guitar-driven hard rock version for 2000 remix album, B'z The "Mixture". This second version is the one the band now plays live. However, during their 2008 "Pleasure--Glory Days" tour, the original synth-driven version made a rare return, with Tak Matsumoto playing a Yamaha MG-M guitar, something the guitarist hasn't done for years.

== See also ==
- 1988 in Japanese music
