= Giri Giri Chop =

Single by B'z

from the album Brotherhood
- Released: June 9, 1999
- Recorded: 1999
- Genre: Hard rock
- Length: 3:59
- Label: Rooms
- Songwriters: Koshi Inaba; Tak Matsumoto
- Producer: Tak Matsumoto

B'z singles chronology
"Home" (1998)	"Giri Giri Chop" (1999)	"Kon'ya Tsuki no Mieru Oka ni" (2000)

"Giri Giri Chop" is the twenty-sixth single by B'z, released on June 9, 1999. This song is one of B'z many number-one singles on the Oricon chart. "Giri Giri Chop" was used as the sixth opening song for Detective Conan and the song "One" was also used as the theme song for third Detective Conan film, The Last Wizard of the Century. It became the best selling opening single in the Detective Conan series, with 805,000 units.

== Track listing ==
1. "Giri Giri Chop" (ギリギリ Chop)
2. "One"

== Certifications ==
Region	Certification	Certified units/sales
Japan (RIAJ)	2× Platinum	800,000^{^}
^{^} Shipments figures based on certification alone.
