= Zero (B'z song) =

Single by B'z

from the album Run
- Released: October 7, 1992
- Genre: Hard rock
- Label: BMG Japan
- Songwriter(s): Koshi Inaba; Tak Matsumoto
- Producer(s): Tak Matsumoto

B'z singles chronology
| "Blowin'" (1992) | "Zero" (1992) | "Ai no mama ni Wagamama ni Boku wa Kimi dake wo Kizutsukenai" (1993) |

"Zero" is the eleventh single by B'z, released on October 7, 1992, and the only one from their album Run. This song is one of B'z many number-one singles on the Oricon chart, selling over 600,000 copies in its first week, although there was no tie up for the song at that moment. The single was re-released in 2003, and re-entered at #4. It sold over 1,310,000 copies according to Oricon.

== Track listing ==
1. "Zero"
2. "Koi-gokoro"

== Certifications ==
| Region | Certification | Certified units/sales |
|---|---|---|
| Japan (RIAJ) | 3× Platinum | 1,200,000^{^} |
^{^} Shipments figures based on certification alone.
