= B'z =

Japanese rock duo

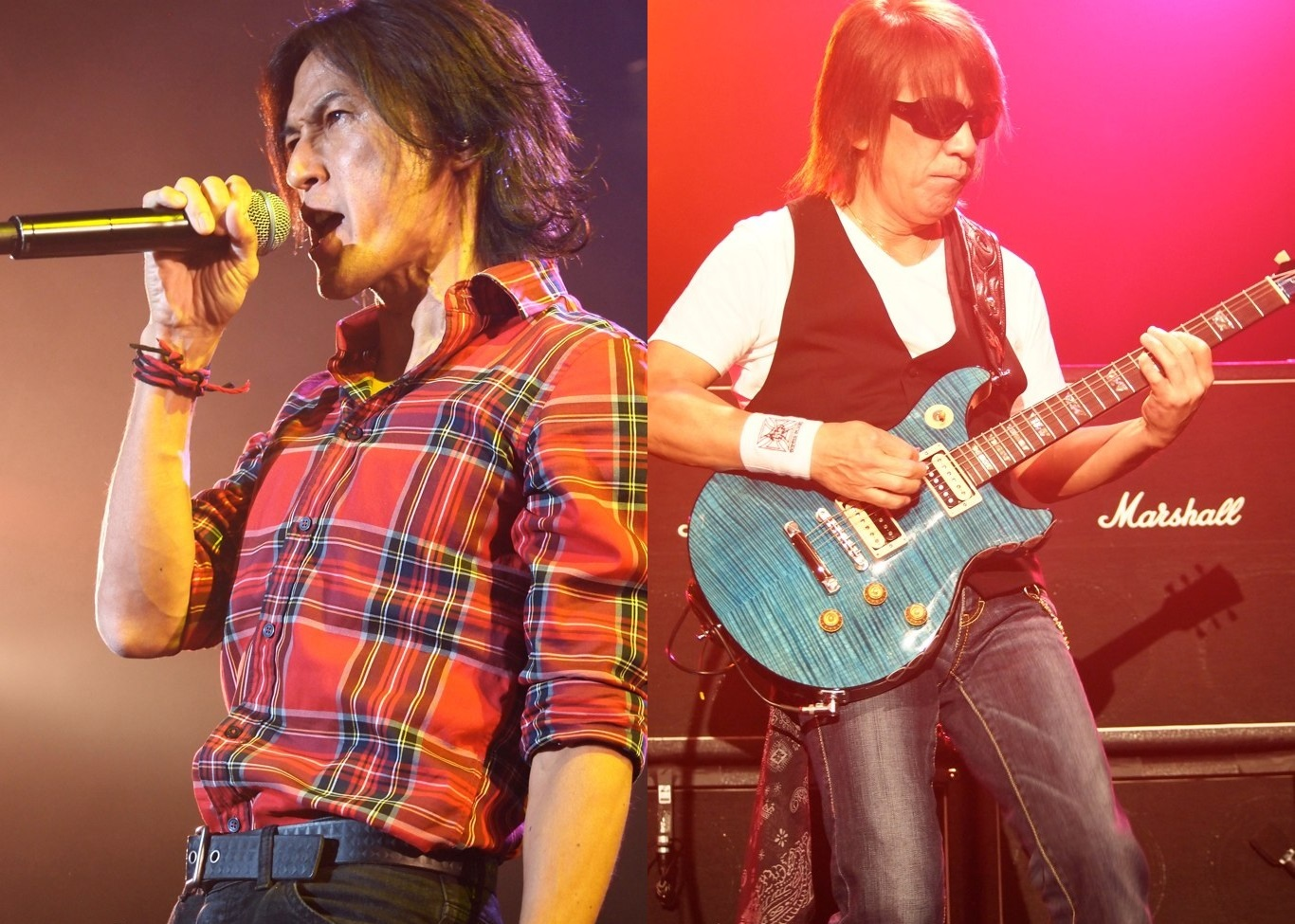
- Koshi Inaba (left) and Takahiro Matsumoto performing in 2012

Background information
- Origin: Japan
- Genres: Hard rock; blues rock; dance-rock; J-pop
- Works: B'z discography
- Years active: 1988–present
- Labels: Bertelsmann–BMG Japan (1988–1995); Being Inc.–Vermillion (1995–present)
- Members: Tak Matsumoto; Koshi Inaba
- Website: bz-vermillion.com

B'z (Japanese: ビーズ, Hepburn: Bīzu) is a Japanese rock duo consisting of guitarist, composer and producer Takahiro "Tak" Matsumoto and vocalist and lyricist Koshi Inaba, known for their energetic hard rock tracks. B'z is one of the best-selling music artists in the world and the best-selling in their native Japan by certifications, having released 50 consecutive No. 1 singles, 27 No. 1 albums, and 4 No. 1 EPs on the Oricon music charts, and have sold more than 100 million records worldwide.

In 2003, HMV Japan ranked them at number 30 on their list of the 100 most important Japanese pop acts. In 2007, B'z became the first music act from Asia to have their handprints and signatures put up on Hollywood's RockWalk. In 2008, they were awarded a Guinness World Record for "Best-selling album act in Japan", which also notes them to be the best-selling act in Japan overall.

== History ==
=== Early works (1988–1990) ===
B'z band logo

In the late 1980s, Tak Matsumoto had been extremely busy as a guitarist with various recording sessions and live performances, including for Tetsuya Komuro's TM Network and Mari Hamada. On May 21, 1988, Matsumoto released his first solo album, Thousand Wave, with positive critical reception. However, wanting to start a band, he searched for band members, particularly a singer. Eventually, through his management, he listened to the demo tape of vocalist Koshi Inaba in 1988, who would later form B'z with him. At the first session, they played The Beatles' "Let It Be" and "Oh! Darling". At the time, Japan's music scene was experiencing a band boom. With all the digital sounds in mainstream music, the only sounds that Inaba and Matsumoto felt could not be expressed and replicated were the guitar and the human voice. As a result, they decided to keep it a two-man unit. On September 21, 1988, B'z made their debut with their first album, B'z, and single, "Dakara Sono Te o Hanashite". Their music was very much a product of its times, with synthesizers and samplers sharing equal time with Matsumoto's guitar, producing an experimental sound, very different from their later well-known hard rock sound.

Instead of immediately performing live after a debut album as many Japanese bands were doing, B'z had a clear vision of how they wanted to perform and decided to wait until they had enough material to play live. The two concentrated on recording, improving the quality of their music. Their efforts resulted in a second album, Off the Lock, released on May 21, 1989. With this second album came their first series of live performances, known better to their fans as "Live-Gym". "B'z Live-Gym #00" started in Nagoya, continued in Osaka, and finished in Tokyo. Tickets were sold out on the day they became available. On October 21, their first mini-album (EP), Bad Communication, was released. The title track is a blend of rock and dance music and is still a classic played during their "Live-Gyms". It charted for 163 weeks on the Oricon Charts. Their first nationwide tour, "B'z Live-Gym #001 'Off the Lock'", covered 16 shows around Japan.

On February 21, 1990, their third album, Break Through, was released. It charted at No. 3 on the Oricon Albums Chart. To promote it, they started a tour with 22 shows nationwide. Their single "Taiyō no Komachi Angel" was released on June 13 and peaked at No. 1 on the Oricon Singles Chart; this started a trend of every single released since then debuting at No. 1 on the Oricon Singles Chart. Shortly after, Wicked Beat, their second mini album, was released on June 21. It also reached No. 3 on the charts. Like the band's other releases, it became commercially successful (reaching one million certifications) retroactively between 1990 and 1991. Their fourth album, Risky, was released on November 7 and was their first album to top the charts. It was the beginning of a steady shift in the duo's style from pop rock to 80's hard rock. The "B'z Live-Gym '90~'91 'Risky'" tour, with 49 performances, also started in November. Their first music video compilation, Film Risky, was recorded in New York City and London in four weeks and was released on December 16. With a barrage of releases, 1990 came to be the busiest year for B'z.

=== Transitioning into hard rock (1991–1992) ===
Their third mini album, Mars, was released on May 29, 1991; little promotion was done for it. After releasing only two singles, B'z released their fifth album, In the Life, on November 27. The release of the album marked B'z shying away from their advanced digital sounds and more towards rock. Their first live video, "Just Another Life", was out on December 11. For promotion, B'z also embarked on their "B'z Live-Gym '91~'92 'In the Life'" tour, with 66 performances in total. The tour started in December and managed to flow into the next year. The total number of "Live-Gyms" they did during that year exceeded 100.

In the summer of 1992, the "B'z Pleasure '92 'Time'" tour took place with 12 performances in 3 major cities. The arena-class tour had amazing features such as a huge lighting set, called the "Starfish", and seats that rotated 360 degrees. October 28 marked the release of their sixth album, Run, and proved to be even more hard rock oriented than their previous albums. On December 9, they released a slightly different mini-album, Friends. Different from Run, its concept is somewhat similar to that of a movie soundtrack.

=== Switching to blues (1993–1994) ===
In early 1993, the Run tour concluded after 49 performances in 21 locations. In March, B'z released their twelfth and best-selling single, "Ai no mama ni Wagamama ni Boku wa Kimi dake o Kizutsukenai", which was certified double-million by the RIAJ in 2003. They then held an open-air concert for the first time, called "B'z Live-Gym Pleasure '93 'Jap the Ripper'". The shows took place at Bentenjima in Hamamatsu-city, Shizuoka on July 31 and August 1. The successful event gathered fifty thousand people per day, totaling 100,000 people in the end. Following this, B'z concentrated on recording once again, which resulted in a lot of material. On February 9, 1994, the "B'z Live-Gym '94 'The 9th Blues'" tour started. The tour became their longest and biggest tour thus far, managing 87 performances in a year. During the tour, their seventh and only double album, The 7th Blues, was released on March 2. The album title not only came from it being their seventh album but also after the seventh chord that is frequently used in blues. Becoming much more "bluesier" and soulful, this album evidently shows their lean towards blues. The album was made as kind of a "fan trap," as they wanted to "weed out" casual and non-rock fans from their fanbase as they shifted more towards rock. It included the hit single "Don't Leave Me" and a bluesy re-recording of "Lady Navigation". "The 9th Blues" tour finished at the Tsukisamu Green Dome in Sapporo on December 24.

=== Adopting pop and temporary hiatus (1995–1998) ===
In the first half of 1995, B'z spent their time recording, and after creating numerous demos, they held the "B'z Pleasure '95 'Buzz'" stadium tour with 12 shows in 7 cities. Their eighth album, Loose, was released on November 22. Loose was concentrated on the original concept of a two-man band. While combining rock with pop, this album is well-balanced with a variety of sounds. The album sold over 3 million copies, making it their best-selling album at the time. The "B'z Live-Gym '96 'Spirit Loose'" tour started on March 15, 1996, and held 44 performances in 21 locations. The show opened with a short B'z action movie shot in Los Angeles. A short while afterward, B'z released their 6th mini-album, titled Friends II, on November 25. Much like Friends before it, the album displayed more of an adult-oriented rock.

During a short hiatus in 1997, Inaba released his debut solo album, Magma, on which he wrote all the music and lyrics. The album, which topped the Oricon charts, showcased another side of him, different from that of his usual image in B'z. In March, the dome tour "B'z Live-Gym Pleasure '97 'Fireball'" consisted of 9 performances in 5 locations. Tickets for each dome, which have a capacity of about 30 to 50 thousand people each, were all sold out. The tour included stops at Tokyo (3 nights), Nagoya, Osaka, Fukuoka, and Maebashi, all being successful. On November 19, their ninth studio album, Survive, showcased yet another new direction in sound and style. B'z's first promotional effort for the album included performances in concert halls in Akita, Hakodate, Kōchi, Shiga, and Nagasaki, before plunging into the main tour, "B'z Live-Gym '98 'Survive'", which started on January 24, 1998. On May 20, B'z released their first official compilation album, B'z The Best "Pleasure", which also marked their 10th year since debuting. Every song included in this album was a huge hit and was highly acclaimed as it was the first Japanese album to sell more than 5 million copies, which was achieved by the end of the year. On June 6, the "Survive" tour successfully ended. In mid-1998, B'z entered a period of both rest and recording. During that period, on September 20, their second best-of album, B'z The Best "Treasure" was released, selling almost 4.5 million copies by the end of the year.

=== Returning to the music scene (1999–2000) ===
B'z started off 1999 by busily promoting their recent singles and their tenth studio album, Brotherhood, which was released on July 14. It is considered their heaviest rock album up to that point. The album's track "Giri Giri Chop (Version 51)" was recorded with drummer Pat Torpey and bassist Billy Sheehan, both from Mr. Big. In July, another dome-class tour, "B'z Live-Gym '99 'Brotherhood'" began in Sapporo and included 14 performances in 7 locations. They did away with extra stage acts and concentrated on their musical performance, playing songs from the new album and many hits from the past. On August 28 and 29, they played at Yokohama International Stadium, which were the first music concerts held in that stadium and gathered a total of 140,000 people over the two days. Although the second day at Yokohama experienced heavy rain, the tour ended successfully. Shortly afterward, B'z started recording again and continued to do so throughout the rest of the year without rest.

On February 23, 2000, they released the album B'z The "Mixture", which included remastered tracks of past songs, B-sides, remixes, re-recordings, and a new song. In the middle of May, they started rehearsal for the summer tour "B'z Live-Gym Pleasure 2000 'Juice'", with warmup shows starting in a hall-class venue in Toyama on May 30. The tour totaled 18 shows in 10 cities, starting with a performance at the famous Nippon Budokan on June 20. Their single "Juice", which featured drummer Brian Tichy, was released on July 12 and set a Japanese record of marking No. 1 in the first week, making it their 25th No. 1 single in sequence. A live video, Once Upon a Time in Yokohama: B'z Live Gym'99 "Brotherhood" was released on August 2. On December 6, they released their eleventh album, Eleven. B'z finished off 2000 with an appearance on the TV show Music Station Special and would start rehearsal for their next tour.

=== Induction into Hollywood's RockWalk (2001–2007) ===
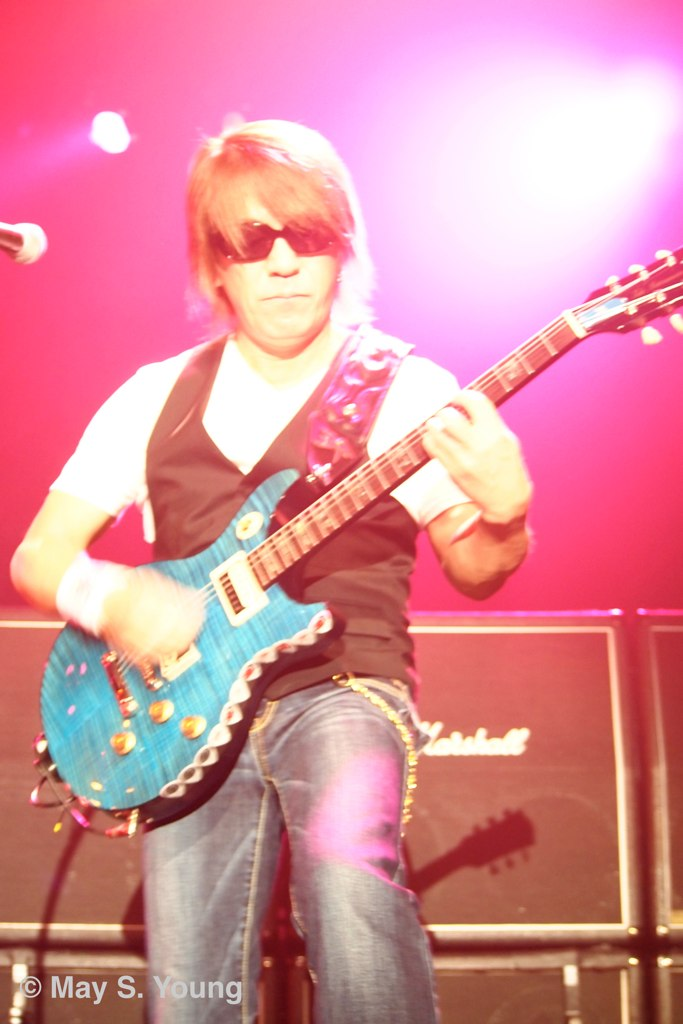
Matsumoto on stage, 2012

On February 26, 2001, "B'z Live-Gym 2001 'Eleven'" kicked off with a warmup show at the Ehime Kenmin Bunka Kaikan, which was exclusive to fan club members. The tour had 46 shows in 19 locations and 600,000 attendees. In March, they released their thirty-first and very popular single, "Ultra Soul". After the Okinawa shows on June 27 and 28, B'z traveled abroad. They officially released their CDs in Taiwan and Hong Kong, and after finishing up the "Eleven" tour, B'z prepared for their first Asian tour, which included "B'z Live-Gym in Taipei 2001" and "B'z Live-Gym in Hong Kong 2001".

While B'z started recording as soon as 2002 started, Tak finished two solo albums, Dragon From The West, which consists of hard rock tunes, and Hana, which includes more melodic and Asian-influenced tunes, which were released simultaneously. B'z finished their recording in the middle of May and started rehearsal in Tokyo for the Live-Gym tour that year, as well as performing with Aerosmith on the stage of FIFA World Cup Korea/Japan Official Concert International Day at Tokyo Stadium on June 27. Aerosmith later invited B'z to open for them in America, but it ultimately never happened. On July 3, their twelfth album, Green, was released. The supporting tour, "B'z Live-Gym 2002 'Green ~Go★Fight★Win~'" began at Saitama Super Arena on July 8 and ended at Osaka Dome on September 9, encompassing 700,000 attendees, 14 shows, and 11 cities. The live band was rounded out by bassist Billy Sheehan and Canadian drummer Shane Gaalaas. In September, after the last show in Osaka, B'z had their first US tour, "B'z Live-Gym 2002 'Rock n' California Roll'", starting in San Diego at Canes Bar & Grill on September 22 and The Palace in Los Angeles on September 24. On November 27, a live video, A Beautiful Reel, was released, which packaged everything that happened on the "Green" tour, as well as a second disc containing material from "Rock n' California Roll". On December 11, their first ballad compilation album, The Ballads ~Love & B'z~, was released.

2003 marked their 15th anniversary, and the two started recording at the beginning of the year, traveling to the United States in February for additional recording. Along with continuous releases, the tour "B'z Live-Gym The Final Pleasure 'It's Showtime!!'" started in July. This was intended as the final "Pleasure" tour, a series of tours focusing on less popular songs, which started in 1991. The tour kicked off on July 3 at Hakodate Shimin Kaikan and finished at Nagisa-en on September 21, which just so happened to be the day of their debut, having a total of 23 shows altogether. Since it had been 10 years since B'z performed at Nagisa-en during "B'z Live-Gym Pleasure '93 'Jap the Ripper'" in 1993, it gathered 100,000 audiences over two days. Even though the shows were hit by a typhoon and it rained very hard, they still managed to attract thousands of attendees.

After the Nagisa-en performance, B'z flew back to the US. The tour "B'z Live-Gym 2003 'Banzai in North America'" included 7 shows, including stops at Las Vegas, Los Angeles, San Francisco, Seattle, and Vancouver. Their thirteenth album, Big Machine, was released on September 17. When they flew back to Japan, B'z started their third tour in 2003, "B'z Live-Gym 2003 'Big Machine'". It was a dome tour in 6 locations, from Saitama Super Arena to Tokyo Dome in December. Tak Matsumoto's cover album, The Hit Parade, with various vocalists, including Inaba, was released on November 26.

Kicking off 2004, B'z went back to the studio to begin recording again. On February 25, a DVD, Typhoon No.15 ~B'z Live-Gym The Final Pleasure "It's Showtime!!" in Nagisaen~, was released. For the rest of the year, they worked mainly on their solo projects. Soon after finishing each solo tour, they began recording together again. On April 6, 2005, B'z released their fourteenth album, The Circle. For the album's recording, the duo was particularly worried about its live sound. For promotional activities, B'z started the tour "B'z Live-Gym 2005 'Circle of Rock'" that ran from April to September, totaling 27 shows in 41 locations. On August 1, the compilation The Complete B'z was digitally released only for the Japanese iTunes Store in order to promote the iTunes Store in Japan, which included a Japanese cover of Maroon 5's "This Love" as a bonus. Matsumoto's House of Strings label, which he established a year before, released its second album, Theatre of Strings, on October 19. On November 30, B'z The Best "Pleasure II", their third compilation album, was released, reaching one million sales by the end of 2005. On June 28, 2006, their fifteenth album, Monster, was released. Most of the recording took place in Los Angeles. B'z kicked off the tour "B'z Live-Gym 2006 'Monster's Garage'" at the Amami Bunka Center on July 2, having 17 shows in all, including 5 big domes in 11 locations and 450,000 audience members altogether.

On November 19, 2007, B'z was inducted into Hollywood's RockWalk as the first Asian inductee in Sunset Boulevard, California, United States. They were recommended by Steve Vai, whom they collaborated with in 1999 on the track "Asian Sky" from his album The Ultra Zone, as well as supported him during his 2007 tour in Japan. Shortly after, on December 5, B'z released their sixteenth album, Action. The drum parts for the two singles from Action, "Eien no Tsubasa" and "Super Love Song", were recorded by drummers Josh Freese and Jeremy Colson, respectively.

=== 20th anniversary (2008–2009) ===
In February 2008, B'z released a DVD titled B'z Live in Nanba. The show was recorded in 2006 and was also broadcast online. The concert featured songs from The Circle and Monster eras, along with a number of older hits as well as several English versions. On April 16, 2008, the band released their forty-fifth single, "Burn -Fumetsu no Face-", which became their forty-first consecutive No. 1 single. The year also marked the twentieth anniversary of the band. To commemorate the occasion, the "B'z 20" campaign was launched that saw two further compilation albums: B'z The Best "Ultra Pleasure" was released on June 18, 2008, and featured the greatest of the band's hits on a two-disc collection in chronological order, along with two all-new modern recordings of older tracks, while B'z The Best "Ultra Treasure" was released on September 17, 2008, whose two-disc track listing was decided by fans who were invited to vote for three songs of their choice at the B'z 20th anniversary website, which featured an exclusive song on a three-disc gift bundle, as well as a re-recording and a remix.

On January 25, 2008, B'z performed "B'z Showcase 2008 -Kiyotake Action-", a performance in their "Showcase" series of tours, which are generally small-venue performances of older album songs and more obscure B-sides that are mostly unsuitable for the larger arena concerts. Following this, B'z immediately embarked on the eight-month "B'z Live-Gym 2008 'Action'" tour, which saw them perform all over Japan. Afterward, they segued into "B'z Live-Gym Pleasure 2008 -Glory Days-", their first "Pleasure" tour since 2003. Throughout the month of September, B'z performed for hundreds of thousands of fans in nine performances across three cities. The special tour ended on September 21 at Nissan Stadium, with a concert on the 20th anniversary of their first release. This performance was later released on DVD on February 25, 2009, as B'z Live-Gym Pleasure 2008 -Glory Days-.

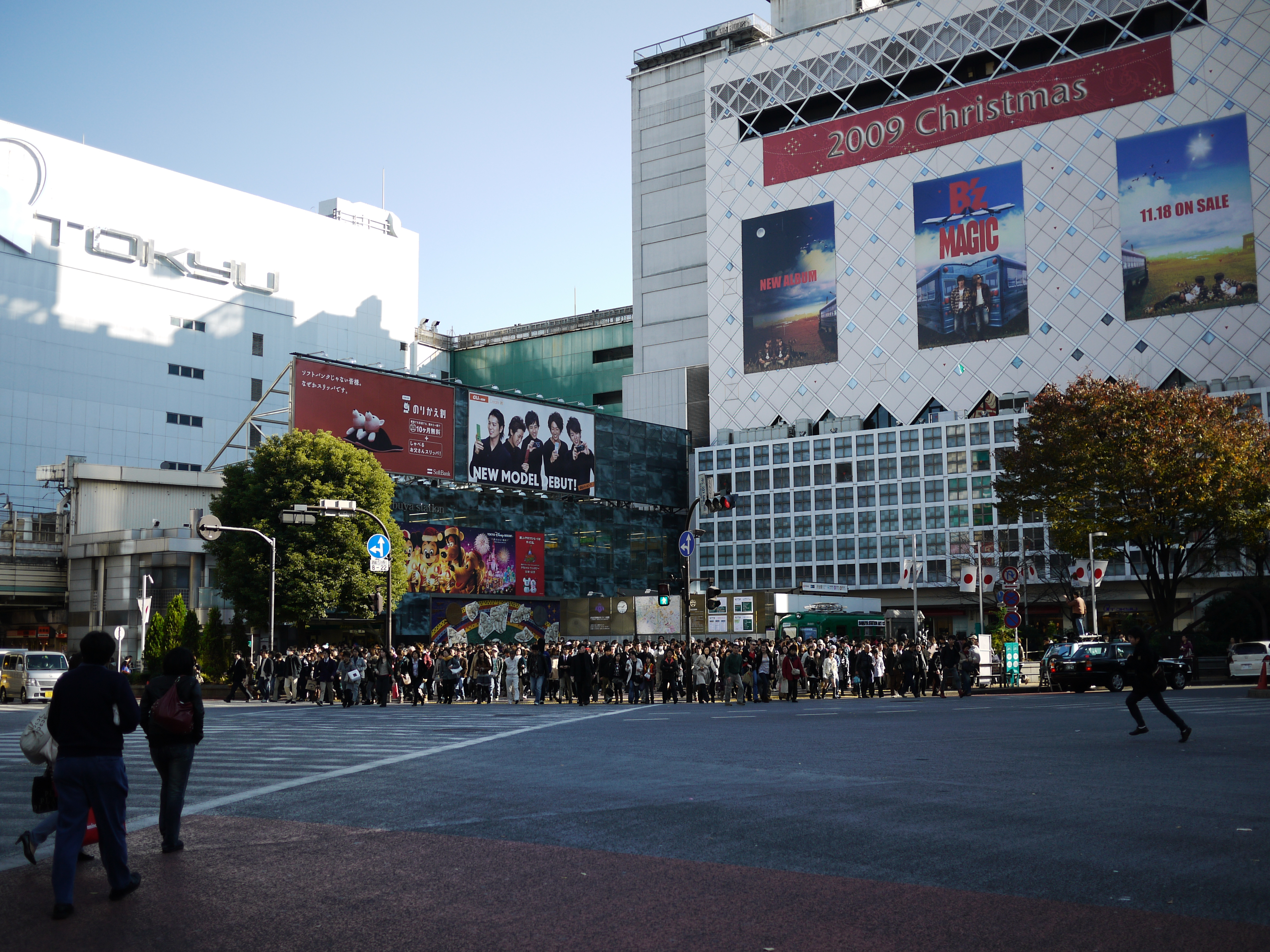
A billboard advertising the album Magic in Shibuya Crossing, 2009

Following their massive tour in 2008, B'z returned to the studio to record new material. Their first release of the year was a Double A-side single, "Ichibu to Zenbu/Dive", released on August 5, 2009, which featured drummer Chad Smith. The non-full-track ringtone downloads (Chaku Uta) of "Ichibu to Zenbu" began on July 13, 2009, and the full-track ringtone downloads (Chaku Uta Full) of the song began on August 26, 2009. Because of its strong download sales in August and September on Recochoku, the song won the "Monthly Recochoku Award, Best Song Award Grand Prix" for Chaku Uta and Chaku Uta Full each for two consecutive months. On October 13, 2009, KDDI also announced that "Ichibu to Zenbu" was awarded the "Utatomo Award" of September 2009 for the sales on "Utatomo" via au's LISMO. The second release was the single "My Lonely Town", released on October 14, 2009. Both singles are featured in the band's next studio album, Magic, released on November 18, 2009. On December 10, 2009, it was announced that their single "Ichibu to Zenbu/Dive" won the "Hot 100 of the Year" award at the Billboard Japan Music Awards.

=== 30th anniversary (2010–present) ===
After the "B'z Live-Gym 2010 'Ain't No Magic'" tour, Inaba and Matsumoto worked on solo activities and did not release any single as a duo in 2010. Matsumoto released the album Take Your Pick with Larry Carlton on June 2, 2010, which later won the Grammy Award for Best Pop Instrumental Album at the 53rd Grammy Awards on February 13, 2011. Inaba's fourth solo studio album, Hadou, was also released on August 18, 2010, debuting at number one on the Oricon album charts.

In 2011, they came back as B'z with their forty-eighth single, "Sayonara Kizu Darake no Hibi yo", which was written for and used as a commercial song for Pepsi NEX. They released their eighteenth studio album, C'mon, on July 27, 2011, which also featured their forty-ninth single, "Don't Wanna Lie", which was used as the ending theme in Detective Conan: Quarter of Silence. In the summer of 2011, B'z embarked on their third North American tour, "B'z Live-Gym 2011 -Long Time No See-", which featured shows in Vancouver, San Francisco, and Los Angeles. On May 4, 2012, they released two singles: "Into Free-Dangan-", an English re-recording of "Samayoeru Aoi Dangan", which was used as the theme song for the video game Dragon's Dogma, and their fiftieth single, "Go for It, Baby (Kioku no Sanmyaku)". "Into Free" was later revealed as the lead single for their new English EP, titled B'z, which featured English re-recordings of "Ai no Bakudan", "Splash", "Juice", and "Ultra Soul". The songs were co-selected and co-written with their drummer, Shane Gaalaas. The EP was released internationally through the iTunes Store and was released on July 25, 2012. To support the EP, B'z embarked on their fourth North American tour, titled "B'z Live-Gym 2012 -Into Free-", which included stops in San Francisco, Seattle, Vancouver, Toronto, Silver Spring, New York City, and Los Angeles. In an interview, Matsumoto explained, "This will be our fourth US tour. We love playing for American audiences and are excited to share our first English-language release with our fans." The tour ended at the Universal Amphitheatre, which almost sold out.

In 2013, the group was the third highest-earning artist by total sales revenue in Japan with ¥5.379 billion. In 2015, they released their nineteenth studio album, Epic Day, as well the singles "Uchōten" and "Red". In August 2017, the band released B'z Complete Single Box Set, and although being a high-priced limited edition, it managed to chart in the Top 10. B'z released their fifty-third single, "Seimei/Still Alive", in June, which was their forty-ninth single to top the Oricon charts. Their twentieth studio album, Dinosaur, was released in November 2017, which was their twenty-eighth album to top the Oricon Albums Chart. To commemorate their 30th anniversary in 2018, they held a large exhibition between April and June at the Yūrakuchō Infos building in Tokyo's Chiyoda ward, their music documentary B'z 30th Year Exhibition "Scenes" 1988–2018 was screened in theatres nationwide, all 20 studio albums released up to that point were mastered for release as LPs, a commemorative book, B'z The Chronicle, was released, and a new "Pleasure" tour, "B'z Live-Gym Pleasure 2018 -Hinotori-", was held. In July, they released the video B'z Live-Gym 2017–2018 "Live Dinosaur", which topped both DVD and Blu-ray charts, selling over 90 thousand copies in the first week. Their new track, "Tsuwamono, Hashiru", was used for TV commercials for the 2019 Rugby World Cup, which was held in Japan.

The theme song for the Japanese release of the movie Geostorm is "Dinosaur" by the duo.

On January 17, 2019, B'z was announced as the first, and so far only, Japanese headliner for Japan's Summer Sonic festival in its twenty-year history. The band previously played the festival in 2007, 2009, and with Aerosmith during a special event, dubbed "Aerosonic", in 2013. On April 10, the band announced their long-awaited follow-up to Dinosaur, New Love. The album was released on May 29, 2019, and featured new backing band members who made their debut on that year's "B'z Live Gym 2019 -Whole Lotta New Love-" tour, as well as a guest appearance by Aerosmith's Joe Perry on "Rain & Dream".

During the COVID-19 pandemic in 2020, B'z made their entire Live-Gym catalog available to watch on YouTube for free, including their most recent one, "Whole Lotta New Love", for a limited time.

B'z covered "Sexual Violet No. 1" by Masahiro Kuwana for 2021's Take Me to Kazemachi!, a tribute album to the song's lyricist, Takashi Matsumoto.

On May 21, 2021, the majority of the B'z catalog was made available on online music services, such as Spotify and Apple Music, worldwide. Previously, only the band's 2007 and 2012 self-titled EPs were available on the iTunes Store internationally (though, currently, only the latter is available). A new song was also released, titled "Kimi to Nara". Later, on December 8, they released their first mini-album in 25 years, Friends III.

On August 10, 2022, B'z released their twenty-second album, Highway X.

On November 12, 2025, B'z released their twenty-third album, FYOP.

== Music style ==
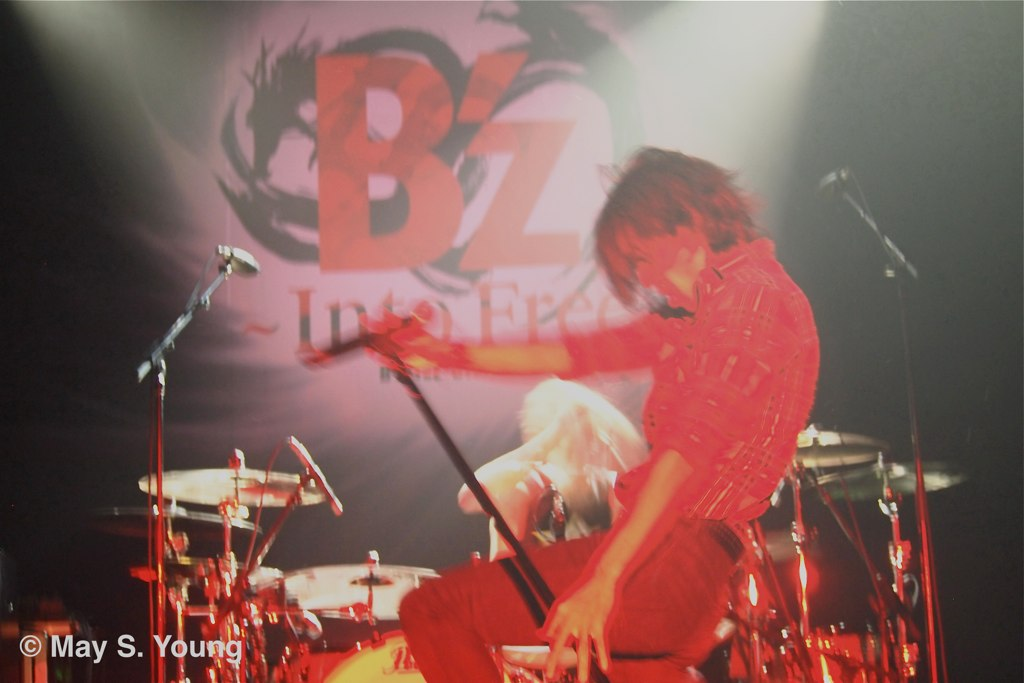
B'z performing in New York City, 2012

The band's music is composed by guitarist Tak Matsumoto, while the lyrics are written by vocalist Koshi Inaba. The band has experimented with its style, "going from dance-rock to hard rock to blues to J-pop and back," according to AllMusic. They have also been described as an "ultra-commercial blend of hard rock, blues, and synthesizer pop." Despite frequent changes in musical style during their first 13 years, they didn't lose any support. In a review of their best-selling album, B'z The Best "Ultra Pleasure", Adam Greenberg of AllMusic notes that they "had some criticism as being more of a pop band with a rock tinge than a full-fledged rock band", but throughout their career, they've shown strong rock elements including "'80s-styled extended electric guitar solo" and "blues-based rock" with various Western rock influences combined with their distinctive style. Compared to two other big Japanese rock bands, Mr. Children and Glay, the sound of the former can be described as "soft", while the latter is "fast and rocking", which is more comparable to B'z. On Magic, for example, they have combined "happy-go-lucky moods and hard rock aesthetics", but instead of sounding like Western glam metal, it's more similar to a visual kei sound, indicating their influence on that movement and bands like L'Arc-en-Ciel. Greenberg, in a review of "Ichibu to Zenbu/Dive", argued that most of their work has a "somewhat disjointed structure", "creative vocal descents and cascades", and "riff-heavy guitars". Marty Friedman compared them to Aerosmith, but stated to prefer B'z because of Inaba's type of voice and high vocal technique, and Matsumoto's personality while playing the guitar solo. Matsumoto's guitar skills have been praised as the "top guitar master in Asia", with "fretboard histrionics" and a "great sense of riff".

== Influence and legacy ==
Matsumoto's guitar style has been influenced by Led Zeppelin and Deep Purple, while Inaba, who was interested in rock music since elementary school, listened to Queen, Loudness, Aerosmith, and others.

In 2003, HMV ranked the band at number 30 on their list of the 100 most important Japanese pop acts. In 2007, B'z became the first music act from Asia to have their handprints and signatures put up on Hollywood's RockWalk. According to AllMusic, they are considered the "biggest rock act in Japan and the entirety of Asia", while the popular music historian Norman Abjorensen described them as one of the most notable J-pop music acts who have achieved Asian and global fame.

Matsumoto, through his B'z fame, is also credited for a "resurrection and reinvention of the Japanese guitar hero", alongside, and in comparison to, X Japan's guitarist Hide for a model of guitarist more interested in technique, technology, and equipment, popularizing the electric guitar as a mass media product in Japan. He also has numerous Gibson signature models, with the first one being released in 1999.

In Oricon's yearly poll of 20,000 people for "Favorite Artist Ranking", which started in 2004, they were regularly placed among the most popular music artists, even in more recent years being ranked at number 4 (2015, 2016, 2017). In 2015, in a survey by Oricon about peoples' favorite song to relieve stress, their song "Ultra Soul" was ranked second.

== Band members ==
- Tak Matsumoto – guitars, composer, production
- Koshi Inaba – vocals, lyrics

== Awards and achievements ==
In 2015, B'z had 35,809,000 reported certified single sales, for which they held the first place until December 2015. In 2017, they had 46,576,000 reported certified album sales, for which they still hold the first place. With joint sales of more than 86 million certified records, they are ranked as the best-selling music act in Japan. In 2008, for their 20th anniversary, they were awarded a Guinness World Record for "Best-selling album act in Japan", which also notes them to be the best-selling act in Japan overall.

They have 25 Platinum and 31 Million physical album certifications, 9 Gold, 33 Platinum, and 20 Million physical single certifications, and 11 Gold physical home video certifications by the Recording Industry Association of Japan. The compilation album B'z The Best "Pleasure" was the first Japanese album to sell more than 5 million copies and was the best-selling album in Japan at the time, which has achieved by the end of 1998, but it was surpassed by Hikaru Utada's First Love shortly after in 1999.

Other sales records held by B'z include "the most number one singles (49), most consecutive number one singles (49), longest streak of number one singles (49), total weeks singles were at number one (66), longest consecutive period with a single at number one (20 Years), most singles in the top 10 concurrently (9), the most million-selling albums (19), most number-one albums (26), and the only artist in history to lead all six major categories tracked by Oricon" among others, including total CD shipments of over 100 million copies. During the week of April 12, 2003, they held eleven positions in the top twelve on the Oricon Singles Chart, except for the second position.

In 1999, at the World Music Awards, they won the award for "World's Best-Selling Japanese Artist of the Year". At the WMA, they have received several nominations, including "World's Best Live Act" and "World's Best Group" in 2013.

Years	Japanese awards
1990	Japan Cable Awards – Most Requested Singer Award; Japan Record Awards – Pop & Rock Excellent Album Award (Wicked Beat)
1991	Japan Cable Awards – Most Requested Singer Award; Japan Record Awards – Pop & Rock Excellent Album Award (Risky); Japan Gold Disc Award – Best 5 Artists Award
1992	Japan Record Awards – Pop & Rock Excellent Album Award (In the Life); Japan Gold Disc Award – Best 5 Artists Award, Best 5 Singles Award ("Lady Navigation"), Best Home Video Award (Just Another Life)
1993	Japan Gold Disc Award – Best 5 Artists Award, Best 5 Singles Award ("Blowin'")
1994	Japan Gold Disc Award – Best 5 Singles Award ("Ai no mama ni Wagamama ni Boku wa Kimi dake o Kizutsukenai"), Best Home Video Award (Live Ripper)
1995	Japan Gold Disc Award – Best 5 Artists Award, Best 5 Singles Award ("Don't Leave Me")
1996	Japan Gold Disc Award – Best 5 Artists Award, Grand Prix Album Award (Loose), Folk Rock Award (Loose), Best Home Video Award ("Buzz!!" The Movie)
1998	Japan Gold Disc Award – Rock Album of the Year Award (Survive)
1999	Japan Gold Disc Award – Artist of the Year Award, Song of the Year Award ("Home"), Rock Album of the Year Award (B'z The Best "Pleasure", B'z The Best "Treasure")
2000	Japan Gold Disc Award – Rock Album of the Year Award (Brotherhood)
2001	Japan Gold Disc Award – Song of the Year Award ("Kon'ya Tsuki no Mieru Oka ni"), Rock Album of the Year Award (Eleven, B'z The "Mixture")
2002	Japan Gold Disc Award – Rock & Pop Album of the Year Award (Green, The Ballads: Love & B'z), Best Home Video Award (a Beautiful Reel. B'z Live-Gym 2002 Green ~Go★Fight★Win~)
2004	Japan Gold Disc Award – Rock & Pop Album of the Year Award (Big Machine)
2005	Japan Gold Disc Award – Best Home Video Award (Typhoon No.15 ~B'z Live-Gym The Final Pleasure "It's Showtime!!" in Nagisaen~)
2006	Japan Gold Disc Award – Rock & Pop Album of the Year Award (The Circle, B'z The Best "Pleasure II")
2009	Japan Gold Disc Award – Best 10 Albums Award (B'z The Best "Ultra Pleasure"); Billboard Japan Music Awards – Hot 100 of the Year Award ("Ichibu to Zenbu/Dive")
2010	Japan Gold Disc Award – Best 5 Songs Award ("Ichibu to Zenbu/Dive")
2014	Japan Gold Disc Award – Best 5 Albums Award (B'z The Best XXV 1988–1998)

== Discography ==
- B'z (1988)
- Off the Lock (1989)
- Break Through (1990)
- Risky (1990)
- In the Life (1991)
- Run (1992)
- The 7th Blues (1994)
- Loose (1995)
- Survive (1997)
- Brotherhood (1999)
- Eleven (2000)
- Green (2002)
- Big Machine (2003)
- The Circle (2005)
- Monster (2006)
- Action (2007)
- Magic (2009)
- C'mon (2011)
- Epic Day (2015)
- Dinosaur (2017)
- New Love (2019)
- Highway X (2022)
- FYOP (2025)

== Bibliography ==
- Brotherhood
- Eleven
- Survive
- B'z The Best "Pleasure"
- B'z The Best "Treasure"
- B'z The "Mixture"
- Green
- 西辺来龍 – Dragon From The West
- Live -on- 1988~2003
- Big Machine
- The Circle
- B'z The Best "Pleasure II"
- Monster

== Tours ==
- Live-Gym No. 00 (1989)
- Live-Gym No. 001 "Off the Lock" (1989)
- Live-Gym "Bad Club-Gym" (1989)
- Live-Gym "Break Through" (1990)
- Live-Gym '90~'91 "Risky"
- Live-Gym "Pleasure '91"
- Live-Gym '91~'92 "In the Life"
- Live-Gym Pleasure '92 "Time"
  - July 18–19, August 19–20 – Yokohama Arena
  - July 25–26, August 27–28 – Osaka-Jo Hall
  - August 4–5, 11–12 – Nagoya Rainbow Hall
- Live-Gym '93 "Run"
- Live-Gym Pleasure '93 "Jap the Ripper"
- Live-Gym '94 "The 9th Blues" Part 1
- Live-Gym '94 "The 9th Blues" Part 2
- Live-Gym Pleasure '95 "Buzz!!"
  - July 7–8 Yamagata City General Sports Center
  - July 15–16 Maishima Sports Island
  - July 23–24 Yokohama Stadium
  - July 29–30 Nagoya Baseball Stadium
  - August 13 Fukuoka Dome
  - August 19 Makomanai Open Stadium
  - August 24–25 Chiba Marine Stadium
- Live-Gym '96 "Spirit Loose"
- Live-Gym Pleasure '97 "Fireball"
  - March 10 Green Dome Maebashi
  - March 15–16 Nagoya Dome
  - March 20,22 Tokyo Dome
  - March 28 Fukuoka Dome
  - April 1–2 Osaka Dome
- Live-Gym '98 "Survive"
- Live-Gym '99 "Brotherhood"
  - July 9–10 Sapporo Tsu Dome
  - July 14–15 Tokyo Dome
  - July 20 Odate Jukai Dome
  - July 24–25 Nagoya Dome
  - July 31 – August 1 Fukuoka Dome
  - August 19,21–22 Osaka Dome
  - August 28–29, International Stadium Yokohama
- Live-Gym Pleasure 2000 "Juice"
- Live-Gym 2001 "Eleven"
- Live-Gym in Taipei 2001 / Live-Gym in Hong Kong 2001
- Live-Gym 2002 "Green ~Go★Fight★Win~"
- Live-Gym 2002 "Rock n' California Roll"
  - September 22 – Canes Bar & Grill: California
  - September 24 – The Palace: California
- Live-Gym 2003 The Final Pleasure "It's Showtime!!"
- Live-Gym 2003 Banzai in North America
  - October 12 – House of Blues: Las Vegas, Nevada
  - October 14 – House of Blues: Los Angeles, California
  - October 15 – House of Blues: Los Angeles, California
  - October 18 – The Fillmore: San Francisco, California
  - October 19 – The Fillmore: San Francisco, California
  - October 21 – The Showbox: Seattle
  - October 23 – Commodore Ballroom: Vancouver, British Columbia, Canada
- Live-Gym 2003 "Big Machine"
  - November 20 Saitama Super Arena
  - November 26–27, Nagoya Dome
  - December 6–7, Fukuoka Dome
  - December 11, 13–14 Osaka Dome
  - December 20 Sapporo Dome
  - December 24–25, 27 Tokyo Dome
- Live-Gym 2005 "Circle of Rock"
- Live-Gym 2006 "Monster's Garage"
- B'z Showcase 2007
  - The showcase 2007 is an unofficial tour. They visited a few cities (3 to 5) and played to small audiences. They played a lot of their old songs. Many of them were rarely played live, including their new English song that was used in Burnout Dominator's soundtrack, "Friction".
- Live-Gym 2008 "Action" – Nagasaki Brick Hall
- Live-Gym Pleasure 2008 -Glory Days-
  - September 6 – Kobe Universiade Memorial Stadium: Kobe, Hyōgo Prefecture
  - September 7 – Kobe Universiade Memorial Stadium: Kobe, Hyōgo Prefecture
  - September 13 – Toyota Stadium: Toyota, Aichi Prefecture
  - September 14 – Toyota Stadium: Toyota, Aichi Prefecture
  - September 20 – International Stadium Yokohama: Yokohama, Kanagawa Prefecture
  - September 21 – International Stadium Yokohama: Yokohama, Kanagawa Prefecture
- Live-Gym 2010 "Ain't No Magic"
- Live-Gym 2011 -Long Time No See-
  - July 20 – Vogue Theatre: Vancouver, British Columbia, Canada
  - July 22 – The Fillmore: San Francisco, California
  - July 24 – Club Nokia: Los Angeles, California
- Live-Gym 2011 -C'mon-
  - September 17–18 Sekisui Heim Super Arena
  - September 23–24 Sun Dome Fukui
  - October 1–2, Marine Messe Fukuoka
  - October 9–10, Kobe World Memorial Hall
  - October 16, Toki Messe Niigata Convention Center
  - October 22–23, Hiroshima Green Arena
  - October 27, 29–30 Hokkaido Prefectural Sports Center Hokkai Kitaeru
  - November 3,5–6, Saitama Super Arena
  - December 4, Fukuoka Yahoo! JAPAN Dome
  - December 10–11, Nagoya Dome
  - December 15, 17–18 Kyocera Dome Osaka
  - December 22,24–25 Tokyo Dome
- Live-Gym 2012 -Into Free-
  - September 17 – The Warfield: San Francisco, California
  - September 19 – The Showbox SODO: Seattle, Washington
  - September 20 – Orpheum Theatre: Vancouver, British Columbia, Canada
  - September 26 – Sound Academy: Toronto, Ontario, Canada
  - September 28 – The Fillmore: Silver Spring, Maryland
  - September 30 – Best Buy Theater: New York
  - October 7 – Gibson Amphitheatre: Los Angeles, California
- Live-Gym 2012 -Into Free Extra-
- Live-Gym Pleasure 2013 -Endless Summer-
- Live-Gym 2015 "Epic Night"
- B'z Showcase 2017 "B'z In Your Town"
- Live-Gym 2017–2018 "Live Dinosaur"
- Live-Gym Pleasure 2018 -Hinotori-
  - July 7 – Okinawa Convention Center: Naha, Okinawa Prefecture
  - July 8 – Okinawa Convention Center: Naha, Okinawa Prefecture
  - July 14 – Sekisui Heim Super Arena: Sendai, Miyagi Prefecture
  - July 15 – Sekisui Heim Super Arena: Sendai, Miyagi Prefecture
  - July 21 – Ecopa Arena: Fukuroi, Shizuoka Prefecture
  - July 22 – Ecopa Arena: Fukuroi, Shizuoka Prefecture
  - July 28 – Hiroshima Prefectural Sports Center: Hiroshima, Hiroshima Prefecture
  - July 29 – Hiroshima Prefectural Sports Center: Hiroshima, Hiroshima Prefecture
  - August 4 – International Stadium Yokohama: Yokohama, Kanagawa Prefecture
  - August 5 – International Stadium Yokohama: Yokohama, Kanagawa Prefecture
  - August 11 – Ehime Prefectural Budokan: Matsuyama, Ehime Prefecture
  - August 12 – Ehime Prefectural Budokan: Matsuyama, Ehime Prefecture
  - August 22 – Sapporo Dome: Sapporo, Hokkaido
  - August 28 – Nagano Big Hat: Nagano, Nagano Prefecture
  - September 1 – Fukuoka Yahuoku! Dome: Fukuoka, Fukuoka Prefecture
  - September 2 – Fukuoka Yahuoku! Dome: Fukuoka, Fukuoka Prefecture
  - September 6 – Toyota Stadium: Toyota, Aichi Prefecture
  - September 8 – Toyota Stadium: Toyota, Aichi Prefecture
  - September 9 – Toyota Stadium: Toyota, Aichi Prefecture
  - September 15 – Yanmar Stadium Nagai:Osaka, Osaka Prefecture
  - September 16 – Yanmar Stadium Nagai: Osaka, Osaka Prefecture
  - September 21 – Ajinomoto Stadium: Chofu, Tokyo Prefecture
  - September 22 – Ajinomoto Stadium: Chofu, Tokyo Prefecture
- Live-Gym 2019 -Whole Lotta NEW LOVE-
- B'z SHOWCASE 2020 -5 ERAS 8820- Day1〜5
- B'z presents UNITE #01 with Mr.Children and Glay
- B'z presents Live Friends
- Live-Gym 2022 -Highway X-
- Live-Gym Pleasure 2023 – STARS –

== See also ==
- List of records of Japan
- List of best-selling albums in Japan
- List of best-selling music artists
- List of best-selling music artists in Japan
