= Blowin' (song) =

Single by B'z
- Released: May 27, 1992
- Genre: Pop rock
- Label: BMG Japan
- Songwriter(s): Koshi Inaba; Tak Matsumoto
- Producer(s): Tak Matsumoto

B'z singles chronology
"Alone" (1991)	"Blowin'" (1992)	"Zero" (1992)

"Blowin'" is the tenth single by B'z, released on May 27, 1992. This song is one of B'z many number-one singles on the Oricon chart, selling over 500,000 copies in its first week. The single was re-released in 2003, and re-entered at number 9. It sold over 1,763,000 copies according to Oricon, becoming the 41st best selling single of all time in Japan. The song won "the best five single award" at the 7th Japan Gold Disc Award.

== Track listing ==
1. "Blowin'"
2. "Time"

== Certifications ==
Region	Certification	Certified units/sales
Japan (RIAJ)	4× Platinum	1,600,000^{^}
^{^} Shipments figures based on certification alone.
