= Lady Navigation =

Single by B'z
- Released: March 27, 1991
- Genre: Pop rock
- Label: BMG Japan
- Songwriter(s): Koshi Inaba, Tak Matsumoto
- Producer(s): Tak Matsumoto

B'z singles chronology
| "Itoshii Hitoyo Good Night…" (1990) | "Lady Navigation" (1991) | "Alone" (1991) |

"Lady Navigation" is the eighth single by B'z, released on March 27, 1991. This song is one of B'z many number-one singles in Oricon chart. The single was re-released in 2003, and re-entered at #6. This song sold over 1,172,000 copies, becoming their first single to sell over one million copies, according to Oricon. It also charted at #7 in the 1991 yearly charts, becoming their first yearly top 10. The song won "the best five single award" at the 6th Japan Gold Disc Award.

== Track listing ==
1. Lady Navigation
2. Pleasure'91 -Jinsei no Kairaku- (Pleasure'91 -人生の快楽-)

== Certifications ==
| Region | Certification | Certified units/sales |
|---|---|---|
| Japan (RIAJ) | 3× Platinum | 1,200,000^{^} |
^{^} Shipments figures based on certification alone.
