= Samayoeru Aoi Dangan =

Single by B'z
- B-side: "Hi"
- Released: April 8, 1998
- Genre: Hard rock
- Length: 8:01
- Label: Rooms Records
- Songwriters: Koshi Inaba; Tak Matsumoto
- Producer: Tak Matsumoto

B'z singles chronology
"Liar! Liar!" (1997)	"Samayoeru Aoi Dangan" (1998)	"Home" (1998)

"Samayoeru Aoi Dangan" (さまよえる蒼い弾丸; lit. "Wandering Blue Bullet") is the twenty-fourth single by B'z, released on April 8, 1998. The song is one of their many number-one singles on the Oricon chart.

== Charts ==
Chart performance for "Samayoeru Aoi Dangan"
Chart (1998)	Peak position
Japan (Oricon)	1

== Certifications ==
Certifications for "Samayoeru Aoi Dangan"
Region	Certification	Certified units/sales
Japan (RIAJ)	Million	1,000,000^{^}
^{^} Shipments figures based on certification alone.

== Into Free -Dangan- ==
"Into Free -Dangan-"

Single by B'z

from the EP B'z
- Released: April 4, 2012
- Genre: Hard rock
- Length: 4:43
- Label: Vermillion
- Composer: Tak Matsumoto
- Lyricists: Koshi Inaba, Shane Gaalaas
- Producer: Tak Matsumoto

B'z singles chronology
"Go for It, Baby (Kioku no Sanmyaku)" (2012)	"Into Free -Dangan-" (2012)	"Uchōten" (2015)

An English version, titled "Into Free -Dangan-", was released on April 4, 2012. It was the band's second digital single, after "Friction", and the first single released worldwide. The song was made for the game Dragon's Dogma, released for the PlayStation 3 and Xbox 360 in May 2012. According to the game's producer, Hiroyuki Kobayashi, B'z was chosen as he thought their popularity would help more people know about the game. The song was not used in the game's expanded version, Dragon's Dogma: Dark Arisen, released in 2013. The song later appeared on their self-titled EP, released on July 25, 2012, which featured English versions of their other songs.

The song debuted at number 16 on the Billboard Japan Hot 100.

=== Charts ===
Chart performance for "Into Free -Dangan-"
Chart (2012)	Peak position
Billboard Japan Hot 100	16

=== Certifications ===
Certifications for "Into Free -Dangan-"
Region	Certification	Certified units/sales
Japan (RIAJ)	Gold	100,000^{*}
^{*} Sales figures based on certification alone.
