= B'z The Best XXV 1999–2012 =

Compilation album by B'z
- Released: June 12, 2013
- Genre: Pop rock, hard rock
- Label: Vermillion Records
- Producer: Tak Matsumoto

B'z chronology
B'z The Best "Ultra Treasure" (2008)	B'z The Best XXV 1999–2012 (2013)

B'z The Best XXV 1999–2012 is a compilation album by Japanese hard rock duo B'z. It was released on June 12, 2013, simultaneously with B'z The Best XXV 1988–1998, and it is part of their 25th anniversary celebration. It reached #2 at Oricon charts, while B'z The Best XXV 1988-1998 itself reached the top, the same happening at the Billboard Japan Top Albums.

The album track listing is composed of several singles released by the band, and features two new tracks: "Yūtopia" and "Q&A", the first being used as the opening theme of TV Asahi's Doctors 〜最強の名医〜, while the latter is being used as the opening theme of Yomiuri TV's Detective Conan.

== Track listing ==
=== Disc 1 ===
1. "Giri Giri Chop" (ギリギリchop) - 3:59
2. "Kon'ya Tsuki no Mieru Oka ni" (今夜月の見える丘に) - 4:13
3. "May" - 4:19
4. "Juice" - 4:02
5. "Ring" - 3:59
6. "Ultra Soul" - 3:43
7. "Gold" - 5:36
8. "Atsuki Kodō no Hate" (熱き鼓動の果て) - 4:05
9. "It's Showtime!!" - 4:00
10. "Yasei no Energy" (野性のENERGY) - 4:39
11. "Banzai" - 3:51
12. "Arigato" - 4:59
13. "Ai no Bakudan" (愛のバクダン) - 4:22
14. "Ocean" - 5:29

=== Disc 2 ===
1. "Shōdō" (衝動) - 3:18
2. "Yuruginai Mono Hitotsu" (ゆるぎないものひとつ) - 4:38
3. "Splash!" - 3:34
4. "Eien no Tsubasa" (永遠の翼) - 5:11
5. "Super Love Song" - 4:00
6. "Burn (Fumetsu no Face)" (Burn -フメツノフェイス-) - 3:52
7. "Ichibu to Zenbu" (イチブトゼンブ) - 4:12
8. "Dive" - 3:00
9. "My Lonely Town" - 3:38
10. "Sayonara Kizu Darake no Hibi yo" (さよなら傷だらけの日々よ) - 3:43
11. "Don't Wanna Lie" - 4:06
12. "Go for It, Baby (Kioku no Sanmyaku)" (Go for It, Baby -キオクの山脈-) - 4:41
13. "Q&A" - (new song)
14. "Yūtopia" (ユートピア) (new song) - 4:24

== Certifications ==
Region	Certification	Certified units/sales
Japan (RIAJ)	2× Platinum	500,000^{^}
^{^} Shipments figures based on certification alone.
