= B'z The Best "Ultra Pleasure" =

Compilation album by B'z
- Released: June 18, 2008
- Recorded: 1989–2008
- Genre: Hard rock
- Length: 133:04
- Label: Vermillion Records
- Producer: Tak Matsumoto

B'z chronology
B'z The Best "Pleasure II" (2005)	B'z The Best "Ultra Pleasure" (2008)	B'z The Best "Ultra Treasure" (2008)

B'z The Best "Ultra Pleasure" is a compilation double-album by the Japanese hard rock duo B'z. It was released on June 18, 2008, and it is part of their 20th anniversary celebration. It peaked at #1 at Oricon charts and Billboard Japan Top Albums.

== Track listing ==
_{All tracks by B'z}

=== The First Run ===
1. "Bad Communication" -Ultra Pleasure Style- – 6:20
2. "Be There" – 4:13
3. "Easy Come, Easy Go!" – 4:39
4. "Lady Navigation" – 4:20
5. "Alone" – 5:59
6. "Zero" – 4:51
7. "Itsuka no Merry Christmas" (いつかのメリークリスマス) – 5:37
8. "Ai no mama ni Wagamama ni Boku wa Kimi dake o Kizutsukenai" (愛のままにわがままに 僕は君だけを傷つけない) – 3:56
9. "Hadashi no Megami" (裸足の女神) – 4:26
10. "Negai" (ねがい) – 3:29
11. "Love Me, I Love You" – 3:19
12. "Love Phantom" – 4:38
13. "Mienai Chikara ~Invisible One~" (ミエナイチカラ 〜Invisible One〜) – 4:40
14. "Calling" – 5:54
15. "Samayoeru Aoi Dangan" (さまよえる蒼い弾丸) – 4:04

=== The Second Run ===
1. "Home" – 4:20
2. "Giri Giri Chop" (ギリギリchop) – 3:58
3. "Kon'ya Tsuki no Mieru Oka ni" (今夜月の見える丘に) – 4:11
4. "Juice" – 4:00
5. "Ultra Soul" – 3:42
6. "Atsuki Kodō no Hate" (熱き鼓動の果て) – 4:07
7. "It's Showtime!!" – 3:59
8. "Banzai" – 3:49
9. "Ai no Bakudan" (愛のバクダン) – 4:25
10. "Ocean" – 5:27
11. "Shōdō" (衝動) – 3:14
12. "Splash!" – 3:34
13. "Eien no Tsubasa" (永遠の翼) – 5:08
14. "Super Love Song" – 3:59
15. "Pleasure 2008 ~Jinsei no Kairaku~" (Pleasure 2008 ～人生の快楽～) – 4:46

== Personnel ==
- Tak Matsumoto (松本 孝弘) – producer, guitarist
- Koshi Inaba (稲葉 浩志) – vocalist

== Charts ==
Oricon Sales Chart (Japan)

Chart	Peak position	First Week sales	Sales total	Chart run
Oricon Daily Albums Chart	1			
Oricon Weekly Albums Chart	1	560,857	972,595	39 weeks
Oricon Monthly Albums Chart	1			
Oricon Yearly Albums Chart	7			
Billboard Japan Top Albums	1			

== DVD ==
1. Itoshii Hitoyo Good Night… (愛しい人よGood Night...) [B'z Live-Gym Pleasure '92 "Time"]
2. Mou Ichidou Kiss Shitakatta (もう一度キスしたかった) [B'z Live-Gym Pleasure '93 "Run"]
3. Odekake Shimashou (おでかけしましょ) [B'z Live-Gym '94 "The 9th Blues -Part1-"]
4. love me, I love you [B'z Live-Gym '96 "Spirit Loose"]
5. Bad Communication [B'z Live-Gym Pleasure '97 "Fireball"]
6. Calling [B'z Live-Gym '98 "Survive"]
7. Love Phantom [B'z Live-Gym Pleasure 2000 "Juice"]
8. Gold [B'z Live-Gym 2001 "Eleven"]
9. Don't Leave Me [B'z Luve-Gym 2003 "Big Machine"]
10. Samayoeru Aoi Dangan (さまよえる蒼い弾丸) [B'z Live-Gym 2005 "Circle of Rock"]

== Certifications ==
Region	Certification	Certified units/sales
Japan (RIAJ)	Million	1,000,000^{^}
^{^} Shipments figures based on certification alone.
