= B'z Live-Gym 2010 "Ain't No Magic" at Tokyo Dome =

Video by B'z
- Released: 28 July 2010
- Genre: Hard rock
- Length: 2:21:00
- Label: Vermillion Records
- Producer: Tak Matsumoto

B'z chronology
B'z Live-Gym Pleasure 2008 -Glory Days- (2009)	B'z Live-Gym 2010 "Ain't No Magic" at Tokyo Dome (2010)	B'z Live-Gym 2011 -C'mon- (2012)

B'z Live-Gym 2010 "Ain't No Magic" at Tokyo Dome is the twentieth live DVD by the Japanese rock duo B'z, released on 28 July 2010. The video sold more than 127,000 copies, peaking at #25 at Oricon.

It was the first Live Gym title to be released on both DVD and Blu-ray. On the day of its release, several other Live Gyms became available on Blu-ray as well, but it was the first title intended for Blu-ray from the start.

The concert was filmed at the Tokyo Dome in support of their 2009 album, Magic.

== Track listing ==
=== Disc 1 ===
1. "Dive"
2. "Time Flies"
3. "My Lonely Town"
4. "Konya Tsuki no Mieru Oka ni"
5. "Pray"
6. "Time"
7. "Tiny Drops"
8. "Ocean"
9. "Love Phantom"
10. "Magic"
11. "Mayday!"
12. "Love Me, I Love You"
13. "Ultra Soul"

=== Disc 2 ===
1. "Love Is Dead"
2. "It's Showtime!!"
3. "Freedom Train"
4. "Dare ni mo Ienē"
5. "Move"
6. "Ai no Bakudan"
7. "Long Time No See"
8. "Ai no mama ni Wagamama ni Boku wa Kimi dake o Kizutsukenai"
9. "Ichibu to Zenbu"

== Personnel ==
- Tak Matsumoto - guitars, production
- Koshi Inaba - vocals, blues harp
- Barry Sparks - bass guitar
- Takanobu Masuda - keyboards
- Shane Gaalaas - drums

== Certifications ==
Region	Certification	Certified units/sales
Japan (RIAJ)	Gold	100,000^{^}
^{^} Shipments figures based on certification alone.
