= List of Oricon number-one singles of 2000 =

The following is a list of Oricon number-one singles of 2000.

== Oricon Weekly Singles Chart ==
Issue date	Song	Artist(s)	Ref.
January 3	"Next 100 Years"	J Friends	
January 10	"Next 100 Years"	J Friends	
January 17	"Happiness"	Glay	
January 24	"Kuchibue"	Mr. Children	
January 31	"Neo Universe/Finale"	L'Arc-en-Ciel	
February 7	"Tsunami"	Southern All Stars	
February 14	"Tsunami"	Southern All Stars	
February 21	"Kon'ya Tsuki no Mieru Oka ni"	B'z	
February 28	"Tsunami"	Southern All Stars	
March 6	"Tsunami"	Southern All Stars	
March 13	"Tsunami"	Southern All Stars	
March 20	"Suki ni natte ku aishite ku"	KinKi Kids	
March 27	"Stay by my side"	Mai Kuraki	
April 3	"Stay by my side"	Mai Kuraki	
April 10	"Gravity"	Luna Sea	
April 17	"SUNRISE Nippon / Horizon"	Arashi	
April 24	"THANK YOU 4 EVERY DAY EVERY BODY"	Amy Suzuki	
May 1	"Wait & See (Risk)"	Hikaru Utada	
May 8	"Sakura Zaka"	Masaharu Fukuyama	
May 15	"Sakura Zaka"	Masaharu Fukuyama	
May 22	"Sakura Zaka"	Masaharu Fukuyama	
May 29	"Happy Summer Wedding"	Morning Musume	
June 5	"May"	B'z	
June 12	"Ah, seishun no hibi"	Yuzu	
June 19	"Seasons"	Ayumi Hamasaki	
June 26	"Seasons"	Ayumi Hamasaki	
July 3	"Natsu no ōsama"	KinKi Kids	
July 10	"For You"	Hikaru Utada	
July 17	"For You"	Hikaru Utada	
July 24	"Juice"	B'z	
July 31	"Mermaid"	Glay	
August 7	"Seishun jidai 1.2.3!"	Petitmoni	
August 14	"Be alive"	Yuki Koyanagi	
August 21	"Not Found"	Mr. Children	
August 28	"Shingo Mama no Oha Rock"	Shingo Mama	
September 4	"Tomadoi"	Glay	
September 11	"Lion Heart"	SMAP	
September 18	"I Wish"	Morning Musume	
September 25	"Lion Heart"	SMAP	
October 2	"soudage"	Porno Graffiti	
October 9	"Surreal"	Ayumi Hamasaki	
October 16	"Ring"	B'z	
October 23	"Hey!"	Masaharu Fukuyama	
October 30	"Tobenai tori"	Yuzu	
November 6	"Everything"	MISIA	
November 13	"Everything"	MISIA	
November 20	"Everything"	MISIA	
November 27	"Missing you"	Glay	
December 4	"Everything"	MISIA	
December 11	"I Will Get There"	J Friends	
December 18	"Saboten"	Porno Graffiti	
December 25	"M"	Ayumi Hamasaki	
