= 2008 in Japanese music =

The following is an overview of the year 2008 in Japanese music. It includes notable awards, lists of number-ones, yearly best-sellers, albums released, groups established and disestablished, deaths of notable Japanese music-related people as well as any other relevant Japanese music-related events. For overviews of the year in music from other countries, see 2008 in music.

== Events ==
- December 31 – 29th NHK Kōhaku Uta Gassen

== Awards ==
- May 30 – 2008 MTV Video Music Awards Japan
- December 30 – 50th Japan Record Awards

== Number-ones ==
- Oricon number-one albums
- Oricon number-one singles
- Hot 100 number-one singles

== Best-sellers ==
=== Artists ===
The best-selling music artist in Japan in 2008 by value of sales, including sales of records and of DVDs and Blu-rays, according to Oricon, was Exile, with ¥19.58 billion.

=== Albums ===
The following is a list of the top 10 best-selling albums in Japan in 2008, according to Oricon.

Rank	Album	Artist
1	Exile Love	Exile
2	Best Fiction	Namie Amuro
3	5296	Kobukuro
4	Exile Catchy Best	Exile
5	Heart Station	Hikaru Utada
6	Exile Ballad Best	Exile
7	B'z The Best "Ultra Pleasure"	B'z
8	A Complete: All Singles	Ayumi Hamasaki
9	And I Love You	Dreams Come True
10	Ā, Domo. Ohisashiburi Desu.	Greeeen

== Albums released ==
The following section includes albums by Japanese artists released in Japan in 2008 as well as Japanese-language albums by foreign artists released in the country during this year.

- January 1 – Guilty by Ayumi Hamasaki
- January 23 - Night Fishing by Sakanaction
- January 30 – Kingdom by Kumi Koda
- January 30 – Darling by Yui Horie
- February 13 – Award Supernova: Loves Best by M-Flo
- February 13 – Love Is... by Sachi Tainaka
- February 20 – Complete Single Collection '97–'08 by The Brilliant Green
- February 27 – The Face by BoA
- February 27 – Daiji na Mono by Idoling!!!
- February 27 – Izayoi no Tsuki, Canaria no Koi. by Yukari Tamura
- March 5 – World World World by Asian Kung-Fu Generation
- March 12 – Kyokuto Symphony: The Five Stars Night @Budokan by Nightmare
- March 12 – Namida no Kiseki by Ai Nonaka
- March 19 – Heart Station by Hikaru Utada
- March 26 – Exile Catchy Best by Exile
- March 26 – Shion by MUCC
- April 2 – Hikari Nadeshiko by Eiko Shimamiya
- April 9 – Gokutama Rock Cafe by An Cafe
- April 9 – I Loved Yesterday by Yui
- April 16 – Game by Perfume
- April 23 – Dream "A" Live by Arashi
- May 14 – Superfly by Superfly
- June 4 – KAT-TUN III: Queen of Pirates by KAT-TUN
- June 18 – B'z The Best "Ultra Pleasure" by B'z
- June 23 – Hayley Sings Japanese Songs by Hayley Westenra
- June 25 – Ā, Domo. Ohisashiburi Desu. by Greeeen
- June 25 – Honey by Chara
- July 9 – Panic Fancy by Orange Range
- July 11 – Envy/Jesu by Envy and Jesu
- July 20 – Best Fiction by Namie Amuro
- July 23 – Hakai by Wagdug Futuristic Unity
- July 23 – Love & Peace by Emi Tawata
- July 30 – Best Fiction by Namie Amuro
- September 3 – Arigatō by Hatsune Okumura
- September 10 – 5 by Berryz Kobo
- September 10 – A Complete: All Singles by Ayumi Hamasaki
- September 17 – B'z The Best "Ultra Treasure" by B'z
- September 24 – Fairy Dance: Kokia Meets Ireland by Kokia
- November 5 – Best Destiny by Miliyah Kato
- November 11 – Uroboros by Dir En Grey
- November 12 – Kanjō Effect by One Ok Rock
- November 12 – My Short Stories by Yui
- November 19 – More! More! More! by Capsule
- November 19 – Color by NEWS
- November 26 – Voice by Mika Nakashima
- December 3 – Exile Ballad Best by Exile
- December 3 – Me... by Emi Hinouchi
- December 10 – Awake -Evoke the Urge- by Deathgaze
- December 12 – Supermarket Fantasy by Mr. Children
- December 17 – Kirari to Fuyu by Koharu Kusumi
- December 17 – Love Letter by Ai Otsuka

== Groups established ==
- Afilia Saga
- Dempagumi.inc
- Girl Next Door
- Hangry & Angry
- Happiness
- no3b
- Momoiro Clover Z
- SKE48
- Shugo Chara Egg!
- Watarirouka Hashiritai 7

== Groups disestablished ==
- Athena & Robikerottsu

== See also ==
- 2008 in Japan
- 2008 in Japanese television
- List of Japanese films of 2008
