= List of Oricon number-one singles of 2007 =

The highest-selling singles in Japan are ranked in the weekly Oricon Singles Chart, which is published by Oricon Style magazine. The data is compiled by Oricon based on each singles' weekly physical sales. This list includes the singles that reached the number one place on that chart in 2007.

== Chart history ==
Issue date	Song	Artist(s)	Ref.
January 1	"Miso Soup"	Tegomass	
January 15	"Shirushi"	Mr. Children	
January 22	"Sen no Kaze ni Natte"	Masafumi Akikawa	
January 29	"100 Mankai No Kiss"	Glay	
February 5	"Fake"	Mr. Children	
February 12	"Honey Beat/Boku to Bokura no Ashita"	V6	
February 19	"Sora ga Naku Kara"	ENDLICHERI☆ENDLICHERI	
February 26	"Michi"	Exile	
March 5	"Love So Sweet"	Arashi	
March 12	"Flavor of Life"	Hikaru Utada	
March 19	"Flavor of Life"	Hikaru Utada	
March 26	"Flavor of Life"	Hikaru Utada	
April 2	"Hoshi o Mezashite"	News	
April 9	"Tsubomi"	Kobukuro	
April 16	"Kodou"	Glay	
April 23	"Zukkoke Otoko Michi"	Kanjani Eight	
April 30	"Dame/Crazy Rainbow"	Tackey & Tsubasa	
May 7	"Brand New Song"	KinKi Kids	
May 14	"We Can Make It!"	Arashi	
May 21	"Eien no Tsubasa"	B'z	
May 28	"Ashita Harerukana"	Keisuke Kuwata	
June 4	"Jasmine/Rainbow"	V6	
June 11	"Seventh Heaven"	L'Arc-en-Ciel	
June 18	"Yorokobi no Uta"	KAT-TUN	
June 25	"My Generation/Understand"	YUI	
July 2	"Returner (Yami no Shūen)"	Gackt	
July 9	"Freaky"	Kumi Koda	
July 16	"Free"	Erika	
July 23	"Music"	Golden Circle featuring Teraoka Yohito/Yumi Matsutoya/Yuzu	
July 30	"Glitter/Fated"	Ayumi Hamasaki	
August 6	"Peach/Heart"	Ai Otsuka	
August 13	"Hey! Say!"	Hey! Say! 7	
August 20	"Samurai"	Tackey & Tsubasa	
August 27	"Kokoro"	Kazumasa Oda	
September 3	"Kaze no Uta wo Kikasete"	Keisuke Kuwata	
September 10	"My Heart Draws a Dream"	L'Arc-en-Ciel	
September 17	"Happiness"	Arashi	
September 24	"Eien ni"	KinKi Kids	
October 1	"Talkin' 2 Myself"	Ayumi Hamasaki	
October 8	"Love & Truth"	YUI	
October 15	"Super Love Song"	B'z	
October 22	"Daybreak's Bell"	L'Arc-en-Ciel	
October 29	"It's My Soul"	Kanjani Eight	
November 5	"Hana no Na"	Bump of Chicken	
November 12	"Tabidachi no Uta"	Mr. Children	
November 19	"Weeeek"	News	
November 26	"Ultra Music Power"	Hey! Say! JUMP	
December 3	"Keep the Faith"	KAT-TUN	
December 10	"Seisyun"	TOKIO	
December 17	"Darling"	Keisuke Kuwata	
December 24	"Way of Life"	V6	
December 31	"Dangan Fighter"	SMAP	
