= List of Oricon number-one albums of 2008 =

The highest-selling albums and mini-albums in Japan are ranked in the Oricon Weekly Chart, published by Oricon Style magazine. The data are compiled by Oricon based on each album's weekly physical sales. Thirty-seven albums reached the peak of the chart in 2008.

R&B singer Namie Amuro's Best Fiction had the longest chart run of 2008. The album remained at the top of the charts from its issue date of August 11 to September 15. Amuro became the first solo female artist in 28 years to have an album chart number one for six consecutive weeks after Saki Kubota (久保田早紀, Kubota Saki), who had an album at number one for seven consecutive weeks in 1980. Pop singer Mariya Takeuchi's greatest hits album Expressions stayed atop the charts for three consecutive weeks, making her the first artist over 50 years of age to accomplish this. Other artists who had extended runs on the chart include Kobukuro, Kumi Koda, Exile, Madonna, Superfly, Greeeen, and Mr. Children; each spent two straight weeks on the chart.

Korean pop singer BoA's Japanese album The Face debuted at number one, making her the second artist after Ayumi Hamasaki to have six consecutive number-one studio albums since her debut. American pop singer Madonna is the only Western act to reach number one during 2008 with her eleventh studio album, Hard Candy. It became the singer's first album in 18 years to debut at number one on the Oricon chart. With the release of their second album, Game, girl group Perfume became the second technopop group (after Yellow Magic Orchestra) to have a number-one album on the charts.

B'z The Best "Ultra Pleasure" was hard rock duo B'z's 22nd number-one album, surpassing Yumi Matsutoya for having the most number-one albums. Their record increased to 23 number-one albums with the release of B'z The Best "Ultra Treasure". Rock singer Yui's B-side album My Short Stories debuted atop the charts, making her the second female artist after Seiko Matsuda to have a B-side album debut at the top.

The best-selling album overall of 2008 was R&B group Exile's Exile Love, released in late 2007, which sold over 1,470,000 copies. The second-best-selling album was Amuro's Best Fiction, which sold more than 1,447,000 copies, followed by pop folk band Kobukuro's 5296, with nearly 1,405,000 albums sold. The fourth- and fifth-best-selling albums were Exile Catchy Best and Heart Station by Exile and pop singer Hikaru Utada respectively. Exile Catchy Best sold over 1,222,000 copies, while Heart Station sold a little over 997,000 copies.

== Chart history ==
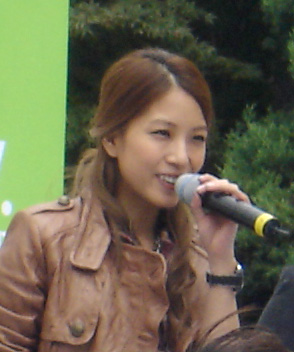
Pop singer BoA became the second artist to have six consecutive number-one albums.

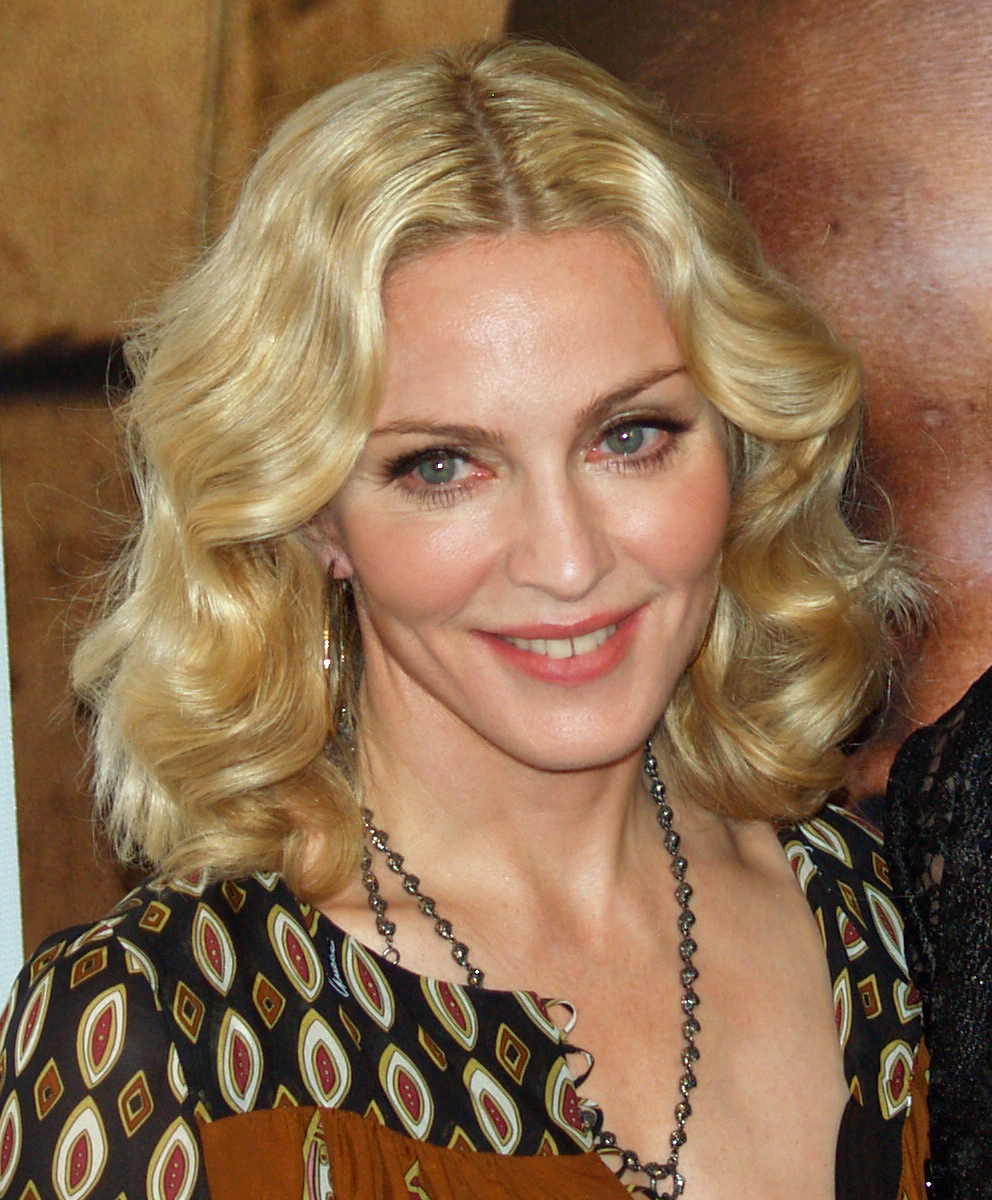
American singer Madonna is the only Western act to reach number one during 2008.

Issue date	Album	Artist	Reference
January 14	5296	Kobukuro	
January 21	5296	Kobukuro	
January 28	Sōshi Sōai 2 (沿志奏逢2)	Bank Band	
February 4	Zard Request Best: Beautiful Memory	Zard	
February 11	Kingdom	Kumi Koda	
February 18	Kingdom	Kumi Koda	
February 25	Award Supernova: Loves Best	M-Flo	
March 3	Complete Singles Collection '97-'08	The Brilliant Green	
March 10	The Face	BoA	
March 17	World World World	Asian Kung-Fu Generation	
March 24	Single Best	Kou Shibasaki	
March 31	Heart Station	Hikaru Utada	
April 7	Exile Catchy Best	Exile	
April 14	Exile Catchy Best	Exile	
April 21	I Loved Yesterday	Yui	
April 28	Game	Perfume	
May 5	Dream "A" Live	Arashi	
May 12	Hard Candy	Madonna	
May 19	Hard Candy	Madonna	
May 26	Superfly	Superfly	
June 2	Superfly	Superfly	
June 9	Mihimarise	Mihimaru GT	
June 16	KAT-TUN III: Queen of Pirates	KAT-TUN	
June 23	20th Anniversary All Singles Complete Best Just Movin' On: All the S-hit	Kyosuke Himuro	
June 30	B'z The Best "Ultra Pleasure"	B'z	
July 7	Ā, Domo. Ohisashiburi Desu.	Greeeen	
July 14	Ā, Domo. Ohisashiburi Desu.	Greeeen	
July 21	Panic Fancy	Orange Range	
July 28	Zushi	Kimaguren (キマグレン)	
August 4	Exile Entertainment Best	Exile	
August 11	Best Fiction	Namie Amuro	
August 18	Best Fiction	Namie Amuro	
August 25	Best Fiction	Namie Amuro	
September 1	Best Fiction	Namie Amuro	
September 8	Best Fiction	Namie Amuro	
September 15	Best Fiction	Namie Amuro	
September 22	A Complete: All Singles	Ayumi Hamasaki	
September 29	B'z The Best "Ultra Treasure"	B'z	
October 6	Super.Modern.Artistic.Performance	SMAP	
October 13	Expressions	Mariya Takeuchi	
October 20	Expressions	Mariya Takeuchi	
October 27	Expressions	Mariya Takeuchi	
November 3	We Love Hexagon (We Love ♥ ヘキサゴン)	Hexagon All Stars	
November 10	Porno Graffitti Best Ace	Porno Graffitti	
November 17	Best Destiny	Miliyah Kato	
November 24	My Short Stories	Yui	
December 1	Color	NEWS	
December 8	Voice	Mika Nakashima	
December 15	Exile Ballad Best	Exile	
December 22	Supermarket Fantasy	Mr. Children	
December 29	Supermarket Fantasy	Mr. Children	

== See also ==
- 2008 in music
