= Burn (Fumetsu no Face) =

"Burn: Fumetsu no Face"

Single by B'z
- Released: April 16, 2008
- Genre: Hard rock
- Length: 10:43
- Label: Vermillion Records
- Songwriter(s): Koshi Inaba, Tak Matsumoto
- Producer(s): Tak Matsumoto

B'z singles chronology
"Super Love Song" (2007)	"Burn: Fumetsu no Face" (2008)	"Ichibu to Zenbu/Dive" (2009)

"Burn: Fumetsu no Face" is the forty-fifth single by B'z, released on April 16, 2008. The song was used in a commercial for the Kose Esprique Precious company. This is one of the many number-one singles by B'z at Oricon Singles Chart, as well first number one on the newly established Billboard Japan Hot 100 and the Top Singles Sales chart.

It is their first single since "Lady-Go-Round" (1990) not to sell over 200,000 copies.

== Track listing ==
1. Burn: Fumetsu no Face (Burn -フメツノフェイス-) - 3:51
  The full music video for the song first premiered on the official fanclub site, B'z Party, marking only the second time this was the case—the first being Ai no Bakudan. Similarly, it was the second music video by the band to employ extensive CG—the first being Super Love Song. The song made its album debut when it was later featured on the band's second anniversary collection, B'z The Best "Ultra Treasure", as the thirteenth track on the second disc.
2. Yokohama - 4:02
  The song was completed and recorded during the Monster sessions, but was first heard with this single's release. Before the single went on sale, the track as played on "FM yokohama 84.7". Additionally, Inaba also attended college in Yokohama.
3. Kibo no Uta (希望の歌) - 2:50
  Also recorded as part of the Monster sessions, the song was first made publicly available with this release. It had been heard by fans prior to this at the March 9th performance during their 2008 tour promoting their latest release, Action, when the song was played to the audience as the band left the stage.

== Certifications ==
Region	Certification	Certified units/sales
Japan (RIAJ)	Gold	100,000^{^}
^{^} Shipments figures based on certification alone.
