= Lonely Woman =

Lonely Woman may refer to:

- "Lonely Woman" (composition), a 1959 jazz composition by Ornette Coleman
- Lonely Woman (album), a 1962 album by the Modern Jazz Quartet featuring the above composition
- "Lonely Woman" (Stan Kenton song), 1948
- "Lonely Woman", a jazz composition by Horace Silver from the 1965 album Song for My Father
- "Lonely Woman", a 2005 song by Southern All Stars
- Lonely Women, an American radio soap opera during World War II
- The Lonely Woman, a 1918 American film
- The Lonely Woman, a 1973 Spanish-French-Italian drama film
- A Lonely Woman, a 1981 Polish drama film
