= Big Machine (album) =

Studio album by B'z
- Released: September 17, 2003
- Recorded: 2003
- Studios: Rodeo Recording, Birdman West, Shian, Red Way Studio
- Genres: Hard rock; pop rock
- Length: 50:56
- Label: Vermillion Records
- Producer: Tak Matsumoto

B'z chronology
Green (2002)	Big Machine (2003)	The Circle (2005)

Singles from Big Machine
- 1. "It's Showtime!!" Released: March 26, 2003; 2. "Yasei no Energy" Released: July 16, 2003

Big Machine is the thirteenth studio album by the Japanese rock duo B'z, released on September 17, 2003.

== Track listing ==
1. "Arakure" (アラクレ) – 3:25
2. "Yasei no Energy" (野性のENERGY) – 4:39
3. "Wake Up, Right Now" – 3:18
4. "Hakanai Diamond" (儚いダイヤモンド; Hakanai Daiyamondo) – 3:28
5. "I'm in Love?" – 2:59
6. "It's Showtime!!" – 4:00
7. "Ai to Nikushimi no Hajimari" (愛と憎しみのハジマリ) – 4:26
8. "Big Machine" – 3:34
9. "Nightbird" – 3:56
10. "Bluesy na Asa" (ブルージーな朝; Burūji na Asa) – 3:57
11. "Mabushii Sign" (眩しいサイン; Mabushii Sain) – 4:05
12. "Change the Future" - 3:56
13. "Roots" – 5:13

== Personnel ==
- Tak Matsumoto – guitar
- Koshi Inaba – vocals

Additional personnel

- Akihito Tokunaga – bass and programming
- Brian Tichy – drums (tracks 2, 3, 4, 5, 7, 12)
- Chris Frazier – drums (track 10)
- Shane Gaalaas – drums (tracks 1, 2, 6, 8, 9, 11, 13)

== Charts ==
Weekly chart performance for Big Machine
Chart (2003)	Peak position
Japanese Albums (Oricon)	1

== Certifications ==
Certifications for Big Machine
Region	Certification	Certified units/sales
Japan (RIAJ)	3× Platinum	750,000^{^}
^{^} Shipments figures based on certification alone.
