= 49th Japan Record Awards =

2007 Japanese music awards ceremony

- Date: December 30, 2007
- Venue: New National Theatre, Tokyo
- Hosted by: Masaaki Sakai, Yuri Ebihara, Moe Oshikiri

Television/radio coverage
- Network: TBS

The 49th Annual Japan Record Awards took place at the New National Theatre in Shibuya, Tokyo, on December 30, 2007, starting at 6:30PM JST. The primary ceremonies were televised in Japan on TBS.

== Awards winners ==
- Japan Record Award: Tsubomi
  - Artist and Arranger: Kobukuro
  - Songwriter and Composer: Kentaro Kobuchi
  - Record companies: Warner Music Japan
- Best Vocal Performance: Exile
- Best New Artist: Cute
- Gold Awards:
  - ayaka
  - w-inds.
  - Exile
  - Ai Otsuka
  - Miyuki Kawanaka
  - Kumi Koda
  - Kobukuro
  - Kiyoshi Hikawa
  - BoA
  - Kaori Mizumori
- New Artist Awards:
  - Cute
  - Jyongri
  - Stephanie
  - Satomi Takasugi

== See also ==
- 58th NHK Kōhaku Uta Gassen
