= Sen no Kaze ni Natte =

Single by Masafumi Akikawa
- Released: May 24, 2006 (Japan)

"Sen no Kaze ni Natte" (千の風になって; lit. 'Being a Thousand Winds') is a single by Japanese singer Masafumi Akikawa. The lyrics are a Japanese translation of the poem, 'Do Not Stand at My Grave and Weep'. It was released on May 24, 2006. It reached number one on the weekly Oricon Singles Chart. It was the best-selling single in Japan in 2007, with 1,115,499 copies. Others, such as Man Arai, have also covered the single. Arai also published a book about the original poem, the Japanese translation, and the musical score to the song.
