= Eleven (B'z album) =

Studio album by B'z
- Released: December 6, 2000
- Recorded: 2000 (Birdman West, Gardenia Studio, Ocean Way Recording, Sound Image Studios)
- Genre: Hard rock; pop rock
- Length: 54:39
- Label: Rooms Records
- Producer: Tak Matsumoto

B'z chronology
| Brotherhood (1999) | Eleven (2000) | Green (2002) |

Singles from Eleven
- 1. "Kon'ya Tsuki no Mieru Oka ni" Released: February 9, 2000; 2. "May" Released: May 24, 2000; 3. "Juice" Released: July 12, 2000; 4. "Ring" Released: October 4, 2000

Eleven is the eleventh studio album by the Japanese rock duo B'z, released on December 6, 2000. The album sold only 756,910 copies in its first week, becoming the first full-length studio album not to sell a million copies in its first week since Risky. However, the album managed to sell over 1,132,180 copies.

== Track listing ==
1. " I " – 0:24
2. "Seventh Heaven" – 4:10
3. "信じるくらいいいだろう" [Shinjiru Kurai Ii Darou] – 3:39
4. "Ring" – 3:59
5. "愛のprisoner" [Ai no prisoner] – 4:09
6. "煌めく人" [Kirameku Hito] – 2:57
7. "May" – 4:19
8. "Juice (PM mix)" – 4:02
9. "Raging River" – 7:32
10. "Tokyo Devil" – 3:25
11. "コブシヲニギレ" [KOBUSHIWONIGIRE] – 4:32
12. "Thinking of You" – 4:30
13. "扉" [Tobira] – 2:51
14. "今夜月の見える丘に -Alternative Guitar Solo ver.-" [Konya Tsuki no Mieru Oka ni] – 4:10

== Personnel ==
- Tak Matsumoto (guitar, bass)
- Koshi Inaba (vocals, blues harp)

Additional personnel

- Akihito Tokunaga (clavinet) - Track 2
- Akira Onozuka (acoustic piano) - Track 4, 7, 9, 14
- Brian Tichy (drums) - Track 2, 5, 8
- Daisuke Ikeda (strings arrangement) - Track 4, 9
- Fingers (bass) - Track 8
- Futoshi Kobayashi (trumpet) - Track 2
- Hideo Yamaki (drums) - Track 4, 9, 12
- Kaichi Kurose (drums) - Track 3, 6, 10, 11, 13
- Katsunori "hakkai" Hatakeyama (Chinese gong) - Track 10
- Kazuki Katsuta (saxophone) - Track 2
- Koji "Kiratoh" Nakamura (bass) - Track 4, 12, 14
- Masao Akashi (bass) - Track 3, 6, 10, 11
- Shinozaki Strings (strings) - Track 4, 9
- Shiro Sasaki (trumpet) - Track 2
- Showtaro Mitsuzono (bass) - Track 13
- Tama Chorus (mixed chorus) - Track 9
- Vagabond Suzuki (bass) - Track 7, 9
- Wakaba Kawai (trombone) - Track 2

== Certifications ==
| Region | Certification | Certified units/sales |
|---|---|---|
| Japan (RIAJ) | Million | 1,000,000^{^} |
^{^} Shipments figures based on certification alone.
