= Calling (Kobukuro album) =

Studio album by Kobukuro
- Released: August 5, 2009
- Genres: Pop, folk
- Length: 71:29
- Label: Warner Music Japan
- Producer: Kobukuro

Kobukuro chronology
| 5296 (2007) | Calling (2009) | All Covers Best (2010) |

Professional ratings
Review scores
| Source | Rating |
|---|---|
| HMV | 5/5 stars |
| Amazon Japan | 4/5 stars |
| Oricon Music | (88/100) |

Calling is Kobukuro's eighth album under Warner Music Japan, released on August 5, 2009. The song "Sayonara Hero" was written by Kentaro Kobuchi as a tribute to Kiyoshiro Imawano.

== Track listing ==
1. Sayonara HERO (サヨナラ HERO)
2. Koigokoro (恋心)
3. To calling of love
4. Niji (虹)
5. STAY
6. Tenshitachi no Uta (天使達の歌)
7. FREEDOM TRAIN
8. Summer rain
9. Sunday kitchen
10. Kamikaze (神風)
11. Betelgeuse (ベテルギウス)
12. Toki no Ashioto (時の足音)
13. Akai Ito (赤い糸)
