= Tsunami (Southern All Stars song) =

Single by Southern All Stars

from the album Ballad 3: The Album Of Love
- B-side: "Toryanse"
- Released: January 26, 2000
- Recorded: September – December 1999
- Genre: Rock
- Label: Victor Entertainment
- Songwriter: Keisuke Kuwata
- Producer: Southern All Stars

Southern All Stars singles chronology
"Yellow Man" (1999)	"Tsunami" (2000)	"Hotel Pacific" (2000)

"Tsunami" is a song by the Southern All Stars, released as their forty-fourth single on January 26, 2000.

== Overview ==
“Tsunami” was the first number-one single for Southern All Stars since the 1996 single Ai no Kotodama on the Oricon weekly charts. The band used the style of hard rock on the previous single "Yellow Man", which was released in March 1999. However, it only managed to reach the number-ten position on Oricon charts. Therefore, they returned to Japanese pop. The song sold over 654,000 copies in the first week and debuted at number-one, beating out Morning Musume's "Koi no Dance Site" on the Oricon weekly charts. The song once spent two weeks at the number-one position, lost one week to B'z's "Kon'ya Tsuki no Mieru Oka ni", and reached the number-one position again for three weeks, before being dethrone by KinKi Kids' "Suki ni Natteku Aishiteku/KinKi no Yaruki Manman Song" in week 7 of the release. It sold over 2.9 million copies and became the band’s best-selling single. In June 2005, it became the third best-selling single on the Oricon chart, surpassing the sales of "Dango 3 Kyodai".

Featured in their greatest hits album Ballad 3: The Album Of Love, the song was released on November 22, 2000. The album debuted at the number-one position on the Oricon weekly charts, selling over 1.36 million copies within only one week.

The song won "Song of The Year" at the 14th Japan Gold Disc Award and the grand prix award at the 42nd Japan Record Awards, revitalizing the band’s career.

== Cover versions ==
The song was remade by South Korean singer V.One in 2003 with the title "그런가봐요" with Korean lyrics. The song became his breakout single after years of struggling for success and became one of his only hit songs. A variation of the cover was later sung by girl group AOA's member Choa, with piano accompaniment by You Hee-yeol, for the third episode of the first season of JTBC Entertainment's program Two Yoo Project Sugar Man, a music program intended to revitalize songs from artists considered as one-hit wonders by recreating their most well-known songs.

A cover version was recorded and released by the American band Allister in their 2006 album Guilty Pleasures. An instrumental cover version was made by Megadeth's former guitarist Marty Friedman, and featured on his 2009 solo album Tokyo Jukebox. Debbie Gibson recorded an English-language cover of the song in her 2010 Japan-only release Ms. Vocalist.

== Track listing ==
1. Tsunami (written by Keisuke Kuwata)
2. Toryanse (written by Keisuke Kuwata)

== See also ==
- Southern All Stars discography

Preceded by "Winter, Again" (Glay)	Japan Record Award Grand Prix; 2000	Succeeded by "Dearest" (Ayumi Hamasaki)
