= Southern All Stars discography =

Discography of Japanese rock band Southern All Stars

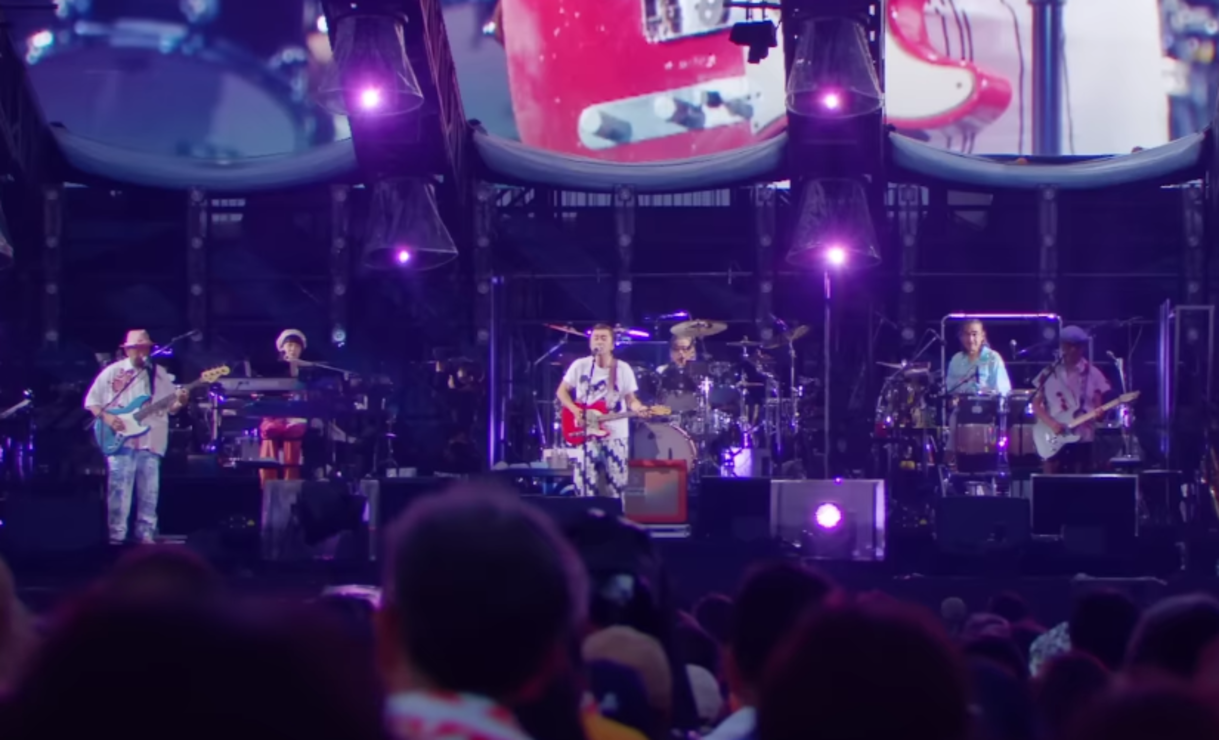
the Southern All Stars performing in 2023

The following lists detail the discography of Southern All Stars.

== Albums ==
=== Studio albums ===
Year	Album details	Peak chart position	Year-end chart position	Total sales
1978	Atsui Munasawagi (熱い胸さわぎ; 'Hot Uneasiness'): Released: August 25, 1978; Format: LP, CT	16	-	101,000
1979	10 Numbers Carat (10ナンバーズ・からっと): Released: April 5, 1979; Format: LP, CT	2	3 (1979)	677,000
1980	Tiny Bubbles (タイニイ・バブルス): Released: March 21, 1980; Format: LP, CT	1	13 (1980)	398,000
1981	Stereo Taiyo-zoku (ステレオ太陽族; 'Stereo Sunny Youth'): Released: July 21, 1981; Format: LP, CT	1	13 (1981)	483,000
1982	Nude Man: Released: July 21, 1982; Format: LP, CT	1	3 (1982)	971,000
1983	Kirei (綺麗; 'Beautiful'): Released: July 5, 1983; Format: LP, CT, CD	1	5 (1983)	637,000
1984	Ninki-mono de Iko (人気者で行こう; 'Go the Way of Stars'): Released: July 7, 1984; Format: LP, CT, CD	1	3 (1984)	814,000
1985	Kamakura (KAMAKURA): Released: September 14, 1985; Format: 2 LPs, 2 CTs, 2 CDs	1	4 (1985)	956,000
1990	Southern All Stars: Released: January 13, 1990; Format: LP, CT, CD	1	6 (1990)	1,193,000
1990	Inamura Jane^{I} (稲村ジェーン): Released: September 1, 1990; Format: CD	1	2 (1990)	1,337,000
1992	Yo ni Manyō no Hana ga Sakunari (世に万葉の花が咲くなり; 'The Flower of Myriad Leaves Blooms in the World'): Released: September 26, 1992; Format: CT, CD	1	7 (1992)	1,794,000
1996	Young Love: Released: July 20, 1996; Format: 2 LPs, CD, MD	1	7 (1996)	2,494,000
1998	Sakura (さくら; Cherry Blossoms'): Released: October 21, 1998; Format: 2 LPs, CD, MD	1	32 (1998)	969,000
2005	Killer Street (キラーストリート): Released: October 5, 2005; Format: 3 LPs, 2 CDs	1	10 (2005)	1,129,000
2015	Budō (葡萄; 'Grape'): Released: March 31, 2015; Format: LP, CD	1	7 (2015)	533,000
2025	Thank You So Much: Released: March 19, 2025; Format: CD	1	—	230,803

^{I} Inamura Jane was originally released under the name "Southern All Stars & All Stars (サザンオールスターズ&オールスターズ, Sazan Ōru Sutāzu ando Ōru Sutāzu)", instead of "Southern All Stars". It was made as a soundtrack album for the self-titled movie directed by Keisuke Kuwata. Nowadays, it is officially counted as Southern All Stars' 10th original album.

=== Compilation albums ===
1. Ballads '77-'82 (バラッド '77～'82) (December 5, 1982) 2 CTs, 2 CDs
2. Ballads '83-'86 (バラッド2 '83～'86) (June 21, 1987) 2 CTs, 2 CDs^{1}
3. Suika Southern All Stars 61 Songs (すいか SOUTHERN ALL STARS 61SONGS, Watermelon 61 Southern All Stars Songs) (July 21, 1989) 4 CTs, 4 CDs^{L}
4. Happy! (HAPPY!) (June 24, 1995) 3 CDs^{1, L}
5. Umi no Yeah!! (海のYeah!!, Sea's Yeah!!) (June 25, 1998) 2 CDs^{1, 3M}
6. Ballads 3 ~The Album of Love~ (バラッド3 ～the album of LOVE～) (November 22, 2000) 2 CDs^{1, 2M}
7. Umi no Oh, Yeah!! (海のOh, Yeah!!, Sea's Oh, Yeah!!) (August 1, 2018) 2 CDs^{1}

=== Other albums ===
1. Enoshima ~Southern All Stars Golden Hits Medley (江ノ島, ～Southern All Stars Golden Hits Medley) (September 8, 1993) LP, CD^{E}

^{E}: By Z-Dan (Z団, Zetto-Dan)—A mega remix of hit singles.

=== Reissues ===
1st (Atsui Muna-Sawagi) to 5th (Nude Man) albums are reissued as CDs.	June 21, 1984
1st to 7th (Ninki-Mono de Ikō) CDs are reissued.	June 25, 1989
1st to 6th (Kirei) CDs are reissued.	April 22, 1998
7th to 11th (Yo ni Man’yō no Hana ga Saku Nari) CDs are reissued.	May 22, 1998
Ballads and Ballads 2 are reissued.	June 25, 1998
1st to 14th (Killer Street) CDs are reissued and remastered.	December 3, 2008
1st to 15th (Budou) albums are reissued and remastered for digital distribution. 5 albums per week, over a 3-week period.	November 27th, 2024, December 4th, 2024, December 11th, 2024.

=== Discontinued albums ===
All released in Compact Cassette format only.

Original Japanese title	Title in romaji	Title translation	Release date
ベスト・オブ・サザンオールスターズ	Besuto obu Sazan Ōru Sutāzu	Best of Southern All Stars	November 25, 1979 ^{1}
Kick Off!	Kikku Ofu!		July 5, 1980 ^{1}
アーリー・サザンオールスターズ	Ārī Sazan Ōru Sutāzu	Early Southern All Stars	December 5, 1980 ^{1}
SOUTHERN ALL STARS BEST	Sazan Ōru Sutāzu Besuto		October 21, 1981
BEST ONE '82	Besuto Wan Eitī-Tsū		October 21, 1981
Shout!	Shauto!		March 1, 1982
原由子 with サザンオールスターズ	Hara Yūko wizu Sazan Ōru Sutāzu	Yuko Hara with Southern All Stars	December 16, 1983

^{1}: Ranked #1 on Oricon chart.
^{M}: Sold more than million copies.
^{2M}: Sold more than 2 million copies.
^{3M}: Sold more than 3 million copies.
^{L}: Limited release.

== Singles ==
Year	Single details	Peak chart position	Year-end chart position	Total sales
1978	"Katte ni Sinbad" (勝手にシンドバッド, Willfully, Sinbad): Released: June 25, 1978; Format: 7" vinyl	3	23 (1978)	515,462
1978	"Kibun Shidai de Semenaide" (気分しだいで責めないで, Don't Pet Me So Freely): Released: November 25, 1978; Format: 7" vinyl	10	49 (1979)	278,327
1979	"Itoshi no Ellie" (いとしのエリー, Ellie My Love): Released: March 25, 1979; Format: 7" vinyl	2	11 (1979)	727,797
1979	"Omoisugoshi mo Koi no Uchi" (思い過ごしも恋のうち, Imagining Things is Also Love): Released: July 25, 1979; Format: 7" vinyl	7	56 (1979)	227,669
1979	"Shī-chō Kotoba ni Goyōjin" (C調言葉に御用心, Beware of Breezy Words): Released: October 25, 1979; Format: 7" vinyl	2	60 (1980)	377,212
1980	"Namida no Avenue" (涙のアベニュー, Avenue of Tears): Released: February 21, 1980; Format: 7" vinyl	16	-	100,705
1980	"Koi Suru Monthly Day" (恋するマンスリー・デイ, Loving Monthly Day): Released: March 21, 1980; Format: 7" vinyl	23	-	69,337
1980	"Inase na Locomotion" (いなせなロコモーション, Chic Locomotion): Released: May 21, 1980; Format: 7" vinyl	16	-	112,504
1980	"Jazz Man" (ジャズマン): Released: June 21, 1980; Format: 7" vinyl	32	-	52,208
1980	"Wasureji no Laid Back" (わすれじのレイド・バック, Laid Back That You Can't Forget): Released: July 21, 1980; Format: 7" vinyl	28	-	49,147
1980	"Sha La La/Gomenne, Charlie" (シャ・ラ・ラ／ごめんねチャーリー, Sha La La/Sorry, Charlie): Released: November 21, 1980; Format: 7" vinyl	29	-	79,337
1981	"Big Star Blues: Big Star no Higeki" (Big Star Blues (ビッグスターの悲劇), Big Star Blues: Tragedy of a Big Star): Released: June 21, 1981; Format: 7" vinyl	49	-	46,362
1981	"Shiori no Theme" (栞のテーマ, Theme of Shiori): Released: September 21, 1981; Format: 7" vinyl	35	-	54,615
1982	"Chako no Kaigan Monogatari" (チャコの海岸物語, Chako's Coastal Story): Released: January 21, 1982; Format: 7" vinyl	2	8 (1982)	584,473
1982	"Nijiiro the Night Club" (匂艶 THE NIGHT CLUB, The Rainbow-colored Night Club): Released: May 21, 1982; Format: 7" vinyl	8	40 (1982)	297,140
1982	Ya Ya: Ano Toki wo Wasurenai (Ya Ya (あの時代を忘れない), Ya Ya: Never Forget Those Days): Released: October 5, 1982; Format: 7" vinyl	10	69 (1983)	339,798
1983	"Body Special II" (ボディ・スペシャル II): Released: October 5, 1982; Format: 7" vinyl	10	37 (1983)	324,902
1983	"Emanon": Released: July 5, 1983; Format: 7" vinyl	24	-	74,305
1983	"Tokyo Shuffle" (東京シャッフル): Released: November 5, 1983; Format: 7" vinyl	23	-	123,422
1984	"Miss Brand-New Day" (ミス・ブランニュー・デイ): Released: June 25, 1984; Format: 7" vinyl	6	36 (1984)	302,452
1984	"Tarako": Released: October 21, 1984; Format: 7" vinyl	11	-	125,146
1985	"Bye Bye My Love (U Are the One)": Released: May 25, 1985; Format: 7" vinyl	4	17 (1985)	385,847
1985	"Melody" (メロディ): Released: August 21, 1985; Format: 7" vinyl	2	43 (1985)	266,408
1988	"Minna no Uta" (みんなのうた, Everyone's Song): Released: June 25, 1988; Format: 7" vinyl CT	2	12 (1988)	317,645
1989	"Megami-tachi e no Jōka" (女神達への情歌, Love Song for Goddesses): Released: April 12, 1989; Format: 7" vinyl, CT, 8 cm CD	4	95 (1989)	113,040
1989	"Sayonara Baby" (さよならベイビー, Goodbye, Baby): Released: June 7, 1989; Format: 7" vinyl, CT, 8 cm CD	1	33 (1989)	257,758
1989	"Furi Furi '65" (フリフリ'65, Swingin' '65): Released: November 21, 1989; Format: 7" vinyl, CT, 8 cm CD	2	72 (1990)	181,524
1990	"Manatsu no Kajitsu" (真夏の果実, Midsummer Fruit): Released: July 25, 1990; Format: 8 cm CD	4	9 (1990)	548,924
1991	"Neo Bravo!!" (ネオ・ブラボー!!): Released: July 10, 1991; Format: 8 cm CD	1	24 (1991)	431,163
1992	"Shuraba-La-Bamba"/"Kimi Daki ni Yume o Mō Ichido" (シュラバ★ラ★バンバ／君だけに夢をもう一度, Shambles La Bamba/ Dream Just for Your Again: Released: July 18, 1992; Format: 8 cm CD	2	13 (1992)	431,163
1992	"Namida no Kiss" (涙のキッス, Kiss of Tears): Released: July 18, 1992; Format: 8 cm CD	1	5 (1992)	1,549,142
1993	"Erotica Seven" (エロティカ・セブン): Released: July 21, 1993; Format: 8 cm CD	1	4 (1993)	1,742,739
1993	"Suteki na Birdie" (素敵なバーディー, Wonderful Birdie): Released: July 21, 1993; Format: 8 cm CD	3	56 (1993)	512,747
1993	"Christmas Love" (クリスマス・ラブ): Released: November 20, 1993; Format: 8 cm CD	3	52 (1994)	666,755
1995	"Manpii no G-Spot" (マンピーのG★SPOT, Puss-P's G-Spot): Released: May 22, 1995; Format: 8 cm CD	4	71 (1995)	514,339
1995	"Anata Dake o: Summer Heartbreak" (あなただけを ～Summer Heartbreak～, Only You: Summer Heartbreak): Released: July 17, 1995; Format: 8 cm CD	1	25 (1995)	1,132,378
1996	"Ai no Kotodama: Spiritual Message" (愛の言霊 ～Spiritual Message～, Spirit of the Word Called Love: Spiritual Message): Released: May 20, 1996; Format: 7" vinyl, 8 cm CD	1	7 (1996)	1,395,469
1996	"Taiyō wa Tsumi na Yatsu" (太陽は罪な奴, The Sun Is a Bad Guy): Released: June 25, 1996; Format: 7" vinyl, 8 cm CD	5	82 (1996)	385,842
1997	"01 Messenger: Denshi Kyō no Uta" (01MESSENGER ～電子狂の詩～, 01 Messenger: Electronic Maniac's Song): Released: August 21, 1997; Format: 7" vinyl, 8 cm CD	5	-	238,716
1997	"Blue Heaven": Released: November 6, 1997; Format: 7" vinyl, 8 cm CD	5	-	214,532
1998	"Love Affair: Himitsu no Deeto" (LOVE AFFAIR ～秘密のデート～, Love Affair: Secret Date): Released: February 11, 1998; Format: 7" vinyl, 8 cm CD	4	39 (1998)	588,066
1998	"Paradise": Released: July 29, 1998; Format: 7" vinyl, 8 cm CD	4	-	195,038
1999	"Yellow Man: Hoshi no Ōji-sama" (イエローマン ～星の王子様～, Yellow Man: The Little Prince): Released: March 25, 1999; Format: 7" vinyl, 8 cm CD	10	-	105,617
2000	"Tsunami": Released: January 26, 2000; Format: 7" vinyl, 8 cm CD	1	1 (2000)	2,936,439
2000	"Hotel Pacific": Released: July 19, 2000; Format: 7" vinyl, 12 cm CD	2	20 (2000)	825,406
2000	"Kono Aoi Sora, Midori: Blue in Green" (この青い空、みどり ～BLUE IN GREEN～, This Blue Sky is Green: Blue in Green): Released: November 1, 2000; Format: 7" vinyl, 12 cm CD	3	97 (2000)	353,940
2003	"Katte ni Sinbad: Munasawagi no Special Box" (勝手にシンドバッド 胸さわぎのスペシャルボックス): Released: June 25, 2003; Format: 7" vinyl, 12 cm CD	1	23 (2003)	290,595
2003	"Namida no Umi de Dakaretai: Sea of Love" (涙の海で抱かれたい ～SEA OF LOVE～, I Want to be Held in the Sea of Tears: Sea of Love): Released: July 23, 2003; Format: 7" vinyl, 12 cm CD	1	7 (2003)	743,326
2004	"Aya: Aja" (彩 ～Aja～): Released: April 14, 2004; Format: 7" vinyl, 12 cm CD	1	23 (2004)	279,483
2004	"Kimi Koso Sutaa da"/"Yume ni Kieta Julia" (君こそスターだ／夢に消えたジュリア, You are the Star/Julia Disappeared in a Dream): Released: July 21, 2004; Format: 7" vinyl, CT, 12 cm CD	1	8 (2004)	457,596
2004	"Ai to Yokubō no Hibi"/"Lonely Woman" (愛と欲望の日々／LONELY WOMAN, Days of Love and Desire): Released: November 24, 2004; Format: 7" vinyl, CT, 12 cm CD	1	16 (2005)	371,706
2005	"Bohbo No.5"/"Kami no Shima Haruka Kuni" (BOHBO No.5／神の島遥か国, Bohbo No.5/God's Island, the Country So Far): Released: July 20, 2005; Format: 7" vinyl, CT, 12 cm CD	3	33 (2005)	259,109
2006	"Dirty Old Man: Saraba Natsu yo" (DIRTY OLD MAN ～さらば夏よ～, Dirty Old Man: Goodbye Summer): Released: August 9, 2006; Format: 7" vinyl, 12 cm CD	1	38 (2006)	224,911
2008	"I Am Your Singer": Released: August 6, 2008; Format: 7" vinyl, 12 cm CD	1	3 (2008)	522,557
2013	"Peace to Hi-lite" (ピースとハイライト, Peace & Hi-lite): Released: August 7, 2013; Format: 7" vinyl, 12 cm CD	1	17 (2013)	373,568
2014	"Tokyo Victory" (東京VICTORY): Released: September 10, 2014; Format: 7" vinyl, 12 cm CD	1	51 (2014)	138,522

Reissues

- The first 23 singles were reissued as remastered 8 cm CDs on June 25, 1988.
- Itoshi no Ellie was reissued with a different sleeve on April 23, 1997.
- The first 34 singles were reissued with different sleeves on February 11, 1998.
- Katte ni Sinbad is reissued as the Katte ni Sinbad: Munasawagi no Special Box (勝手にシンドバッド 胸さわぎのスペシャルボックス, Willfully, Sinbad: Uneasy Special Box) for the 25th anniversary of the group on June 23, 2003.
- The first 44 singles and the Katte ni Sinbad: Munasawagi no Special Box were reissued as remastered 12 cm CDs on June 25, 2005.

== Videos ==
Contents	Original Japanese title	Title in romaji	Title translation	Release date	Media
Live video	武道館コンサート	Budōkan Konsāto	Live at Budokan	September 8, 1982	VHS, Betamax, VHD
Live video, PVs	Southern All Stars THE BEST	Sazan Ōru Sutāzu Za Besuto		January 26, 1983	VHS, Betamax
Live video, PVs	匂艶 THE NIGHT CLUB	Nijiiro Za Naito Kurabu	The Rainbow Color Night Club	January 26, 1983	VHS, Betamax
PVs	サ吉のみやげ話	Sakichi no Miyage-Banashi	Sakichi's Travel Story	December 21, 1984	VHS, Betamax, VHD, LD
Video single	女神達への情歌 (報道されないY型の彼方へ)	Megami Tachi e no Jōka (Hōdō Sarenai Wai-Kei no Kanata e)	Love Song for Goddesses (Beyond the Y-Shape That is Never Reported)	April 12, 1989	VHS, VHD, LD
Live video	歌う日本シリーズ1992～1993 LIVE at YOKOHAMA ARENA 29th Dec.1992	Utau Nippon Shirīzu Naintīn Naintī-Tsū Naintīn Naintī-Surī Raibu atto Yokohama Arīna Tuwentī-Nainsu Dissenbā Naintīn Naintī-Tsū	Singing Japan Series 1992-1993 Live at Yokohama Arena 29th Dec.1992	March 27, 1993	VHS, LD
Live video	ホタル・カリフォルニア	Hotaru Kariforunia	Hotaru (firefly) California	December 2, 1995	2 VHSs, LD, DVD
PVs, Live clips	平和の琉歌 ～Stadium Tour 1996 "ザ・ガールズ万座ビーチ" in 沖縄～	Heiwa no Ryūka ~Sutajiamu Tsuā Naintīn Naintī-Shikkusu "Za Gāruzu Manza Bīchi" in Okinawa~	The Ryukyuan Song for the Peace ~Stadium Tour 1996 "The Girls Only Manza Beach" in Okinawa~	March 5, 1997	VHS, DVD
Live video	1998 スーパーライブ in 渚園	Naintīn Naintī-Eito Sūpā Raibu in Nagisaen	1998 Super Live in Nagisaen	December 12, 1998	2 VHSs, 2 DVDs
PVs, Live clips	SPACE MOSA	Supēsu Mosa		December 10, 1999	DVD
Live video	シークレットライブ'99 SAS 事件簿 in 歌舞伎町	Shīkuretto Raibu Naintī-Nain Sasu Jikenbo in Kabukichō	Secret Live ’99 SAS Case File in Kabukicho	February 26, 2000	VHS
Image video	Inside Outside U･M･I	Insaido Autosaido Yū-Emu-Ai	Inside Outside UMI	August 30, 2003	DVD
Live video	SUMMER LIVE 2003「流石だスペシャルボックス」胸いっぱいの "LIVE in 沖縄" ＆ 愛と情熱の "真夏ツアー完全版"	Samā Raibu Tsū Sauzando Surī “Sasuga da Supesharu Bokkusu” Mune ippai no “Raibu in Okinawa” ando Ai to Jōnetsu no “Manatsu Tsuā Kanzen-Ban”	Summer Live 2002 “So Great Special Box” The Stirring “Live in Okinawa” & “Midsummer Tour Complete Version” for Love and Passion	December 17, 2003	4 DVDs
PVs	ベストヒットUSAS (Ultra Southern All Stars)	Besuto Hitto Yū-Esu-Ei-Esu (Urutora Sazan Ōru Sutāzu)	Best Hit USAS (Ultra Southern All Stars)	December 15, 2005	DVD
Live video, documentary	FILM KILLER STREET (Director's Cut) & LIVE at TOKYO DOME	Firumu Kirā Sutorīto (Direkutāzu Katto) ando Raibu atto Tōkyō Dōmu		March 15, 2006	5 DVDs, 4 DVDs

== Video games ==
- Space MOSA: Southern All Stars Space Museum of Southern Art (PlayStation, December 10, 1999)
