= 42nd Japan Record Awards =

2000 Japanese music awards ceremony

- Date: 31 December 2000
- Venue: TBS B-Studio, Tokyo
- Hosted by: Masaaki Sakai, Hitomi Kuroki

Television/radio coverage
- Network: TBS

The 42nd Annual Japan Record Awards took place on 31 December 2000, starting at 6:30PM JST. The primary ceremonies were televised in Japan on TBS.

== Award winners ==
- Japan Record Award:
  - Keisuke Kuwata (Songwriter, Composer and producer) & Southern All Stars for "Tsunami"
- Best Vocalist:
  - Kaori Kozai
- Best New Artist:
  - Kiyoshi Hikawa
- Best Album:
  - Ayumi Hamasaki for "Duty"
- Special Award:
  - Namie Amuro
  - Morning Musume

== See also ==
- 51st NHK Kōhaku Uta Gassen
