= Arigato (B'z song) =

Single by B'z
- Released: September 1, 2004
- Genre: Hard rock
- Label: Vermillion
- Songwriters: Koshi Inaba; Tak Matsumoto
- Producer: Tak Matsumoto

B'z singles chronology
"Banzai" (2004)	"Arigato" (2004)	"Ai no Bakudan" (2005)

"Arigato" is the thirty-seventh single by B'z, released on September 1, 2004. This song is one of B'z many number-one singles on the Oricon chart. Despite being a Japanese word, Arigato was written in Rōmaji rather than in Kanji. As B-sides, the single features "Mou Hanasanai" and "Kagayaku Unmei wa Sonoteno Naka ni", an outtake from the album Green.

== Track listing ==
1. "Arigato"
2. "Kagayaku Unmei wa Sono Te no Naka ni" (輝く運命はその手の中に)
3. "Mō Hanasanai" (もうはなさない)

== Certifications ==
Region	Certification	Certified units/sales
Japan (RIAJ)	Platinum	250,000^{^}
^{^} Shipments figures based on certification alone.
