= Umi no Yeah!! =

Greatest hits album by Southern All Stars
- Released: June 25, 1998
- Language: Japanese
- Label: Victor Entertainment

Southern All Stars chronology
Young Love (1996)	Umi no Yeah!! (1998)	Sakura (1998)

Umi no Yeah!! (海のYeah!!) is a greatest hits album by Japanese rock band Southern All Stars. It was released on June 25, 1998. It reached number-one on the Oricon Albums Chart. Umi no Yeah!! has sold more than 4.8 million copies, making it one of the best-selling albums of all time in Japan and the best-selling double album in Japanese history.

== Track listing ==
=== Disc 1 ===
Disc 1
No.	Title	Length
1.	"勝手にシンドバッド"
2.	"いとしのエリー"
3.	"C調言葉に御用心"
4.	"栞のテーマ"
5.	"いなせなロコモーション"
6.	"夏をあきらめて"
7.	"チャコの海岸物語"
8.	"匂艶THE NIGHT CLUB"
9.	"鎌倉物語"
10.	"BYE BYE MY LOVE(U are the one)"
11.	"ミス・ブランニュー・デイ"
12.	"海"
13.	"みんなのうた"
14.	"希望の轍"
15.	"忘れられたBIG WAVE"

=== Disc 2 ===
Disc 2
No.	Title	Length
1.	"真夏の果実"
2.	"YOU"
3.	"シュラバ★ラ★バンバ"
4.	"涙のキッス"
5.	"さよならベイビー"
6.	"エロティカ・セブン"
7.	"素敵なバーディー(NO NO BIRDY)"
8.	"そんなヒロシに騙されて"
9.	"マンピーのG★SPOT"
10.	"あなただけを～Summer Heartbreak～"
11.	"MOON LIGHT LOVER"
12.	"太陽は罪な奴"
13.	"恋のジャック・ナイフ"
14.	"愛の言霊～Spiritual Message～"
15.	"平和の琉歌"

== Charts ==
Chart (1998)	Peak position
Japan Oricon Weekly Albums Chart	1
