= Gold (B'z song) =

Single by B'z
- Released: August 8, 2001
- Genre: Hard rock
- Label: Rooms
- Songwriters: Koshi Inaba; Tak Matsumoto
- Producer: Tak Matsumoto

B'z singles chronology
"Ultra Soul" (2001)	"Gold" (2001)	"Atsuki Kodou no Hate" (2002)

"Gold" is the thirty-second single by B'z, released on August 8, 2001. This song is one of B'z many number-one singles on the Oricon chart. As B-sides, the single features "Makka na Silk" and "Ultra Soul (Splash Style)", a remix of the song "Ultra Soul", previously released on the album Green. The song was included in the compilation album The Ballads: Love & B'z

== Track listing ==
1. "Gold"
2. "Ultra Soul (Splash Style)"
3. "Makka na Silk" (まっかなシルク)

== Certifications ==
Region	Certification	Certified units/sales
Japan (RIAJ)	Platinum	400,000^{^}
^{^} Shipments figures based on certification alone.
