= Yasei no Energy =

Single by B'z

from the album Big Machine
- Released: July 16, 2003
- Genre: Hard rock
- Length: 7:39
- Label: Vermillion
- Songwriters: Koshi Inaba; Tak Matsumoto
- Producer: Tak Matsumoto

B'z singles chronology
"It's Showtime!!" (2003)	"Yasei no Energy" (2003)	"Banzai" (2004)

"Yasei no Energy" is the thirty-fifth single by B'z, released on July 16, 2003. This song is one of B'z's many number-one singles on the Oricon chart.

== Track listing ==
1. "Yasei no Energy" (野性のEnergy) - 4:39
2. "Tabi Everyday" (旅☆Everyday) - 3:00

== Certifications ==
Region	Certification	Certified units/sales
Japan (RIAJ)	Platinum	250,000^{^}
^{^} Shipments figures based on certification alone.
