= Masafumi Akikawa =

Japanese tenor singer

- Born: 11 October 1967; Japan Ehime
- Other name: 秋川 雅史
- Occupation: singer(tenor)
- Website: Official website

Masafumi Akikawa (秋川 雅史, Akikawa Masafumi) is a Japanese tenor singer. He has released a number of CDs, in which he has sung a broad range of genres, from classical to pop. He appeared on the 57th NHK Kōhaku Uta Gassen broadcast.

== Biography ==
His single Sen no Kaze ni Natte (千の風になって) (released 24 May 2006) made it to No.1 on 22 January 2007 Oricon Singles Weekly Ranking following his appearance on Uta Gassen. Based on the poem Do not stand at my grave and weep, the single has since sold in excess of 1,000,000 copies in Japan. The Korean version was used as a requiem for the victims of the MV Sewol, a passenger ferry that capsized and sank with the loss of 304 lives in 2014.

== See also ==
- Barefoot Gen (TV drama) (2007)
