= Magic (B'z album) =

Studio album by B'z
- Released: November 18, 2009
- Recorded: 2008–2009
- Genre: Hard rock; pop rock
- Length: 45:42
- Label: Vermillion Records
- Producer: Tak Matsumoto

B'z chronology
Action (2007)	Magic (2009)	C'mon (2011)

Singles from Magic
- 1. "Ichibu to Zenbu/Dive" Released: August 5, 2009; 2. "My Lonely Town" Released: October 14, 2009

Professional ratings
Review scores
Source	Rating
Allmusic	4/5 stars

Magic is the seventeenth studio album by the Japanese rock duo B'z, released on November 18, 2009. A limited edition was released featuring a bonus DVD with the video "Magical Backstage Tour 2009" (videos of recording sessions, live footage of their performance at Summer Sonic 09 and more).

It was preceded by two singles: "Ichibu to Zenbu/Dive" and "My Lonely Town." "Ichibu to Zenbu" was used as the Fuji Television drama Buzzer Beat's theme song, and "Dive" was used as a CM song for the Suzuki Swift advertising campaign. The album track "Pray" served as the theme to the Japanese film Tajomaru, which was released to Japanese theaters in September 2009. On the release date of the album, it was reported that another album track, "Long Time No See," would serve as the theme to Salaryman Kintaro 2, which is set to begin airing in January 2010 on TV Asahi.

Magic debuted at No. 1 on the Japanese Oricon weekly album charts with its initial week sales of around 341,000 copies. The album became their 24th number-one album on Oricon charts. The album is also certified Double Platinum by the Recording Industry Association of Japan (RIAJ) for shipment of 500,000 copies.

== Production and information ==
Following their year-long tour in support of their twentieth anniversary in 2008, B'z went on break before returning to the studio. After vacationing in Hawaii, the duo reunited and began work on the album. A color advertisement was printed to announce the album, which was included in the morning editions of Yomiuri, Asahi, Chunichi, Shizuoka, and Hokkaido newspapers, on September 28, 2009. Aside from announcing the album, information regarding the 2010 tour and the release date of the then-upcoming single, "My Lonely Town," were detailed.

The DVD included in the special limited edition contains the documentary "Magical Backstage Tour 2009" that follows the band as they record in the United States and Japan. Live recordings of the Showcase concert events from July through August 2009 are also included, as well as their performance at the Japanese music festival Summer Sonic.

On September 30, 2009, B'z appeared on Japanese radio station bayfm in order to celebrate the station's twentieth anniversary. The show was referred to as a "B'z Special" that served as an introspective and a platform for which to preview the new album. Several songs from Magic were broadcast for the first time with comments interspersed by the band. On November 2, the show was made available via a portal on the bayfm website, and it was later reported that over 10,000 listeners had heard the recorded broadcast within the first day of it being online.

The opening track, labeled "Introduction," was a guitar instrumental requested by Inaba once the rest of the album had been completed. This track was designed to merge into the opening of the second track, "Dive," which had previously been on the album's first single. The slow tempo opening of the single version was removed to provide a more seamless crossover from the end of the introduction track. The album contains two power ballads, one of which is the previously heard "Pray" along with "Tiny Drops," which was debuted on the bayfm radio show. The double A-side single of "Ichibu to Zenbu/Dive" and that of "My Lonely Town" are also included in the album, and upon their releases, became the band's record 42nd and 43rd consecutive #1 singles on Oricon charts. Additionally, the final track of the album, "Freedom Train," was actually the first to be recorded.

== Track listing ==
All lyrics written by Koshi Inaba, all music composed by Tak Matsumoto alongside arrangement by Koshi Inaba, Tak Matsumoto, and Hideyuki Terachi.

No.	Title	Length
1.	"Introduction"	0:37
2.	"Dive"	2:59
3.	"Time Flies"	3:21
4.	"My Lonely Town"	3:37
5.	"Long Time No See"	3:11
6.	"Ichibu to Zenbu" (イチブトゼンブ Part and All)	4:11
7.	"Pray"	4:45
8.	"Magic"	4:07
9.	"Mayday!"	4:03
10.	"Tiny Drops"	4:05
11.	"Dare ni mo Ienē" (だれにも言えねぇ Can't Tell No One)	3:22
12.	"Yume no Naka de Aimashō" (夢の中で逢いましょう See You in My Dreams)	3:17
13.	"Freedom Train"	4:07

== Charts ==
Chart (2009)	Peak position
Oricon Daily Album Chart	1
Oricon Weekly Album Chart	1
Oricon Monthly Album Chart	1
Oricon Yearly Album Chart	13
Billboard Japan Top Albums	1

=== Singles (Oricon Singles Chart) ===
Year	Single	Chart
Year	Single	Oricon Singles Chart
2009	"Ichibu to Zenbu/Dive"	1
2009	"My Lonely Town"	1

=== Singles (Billboard Japan Hot 100) ===
"Ichibu to Zenbu/Dive" is a Double A-Side single, but Japan Hot 100 includes only "Ichibu to Zenbu".

Year	Single	Chart
Year	Single	Billboard Japan Hot 100
2009	"Ichibu to Zenbu"	1
2009	"My Lonely Town"	1

== Certifications ==
Region	Certification	Certified units/sales
Japan (RIAJ)	2× Platinum	500,000^{^}
^{^} Shipments figures based on certification alone.
