= Hadashi no Megami =

Single by B'z
- Released: June 2, 1993
- Genre: Hard rock
- Length: 8:13
- Label: BMG Japan
- Songwriter(s): Koshi Inaba, Tak Matsumoto
- Producer(s): Tak Matsumoto

B'z singles chronology
"Ai no mama ni Wagamama ni Boku wa Kimi dake o Kizutsukenai" (1993)	"Hadashi no Megami" (1993)	"Don't Leave Me" (1994)

"Hadashi no Megami" is the thirteenth single by B'z, released on June 2, 1993. This song is one of B'z many number-one singles in Oricon chart. The single was re-released in 2003, and re-entered at #11. It sold over 1,735,000 copies according to Oricon, becoming their 4th best selling single in Japan.

== Track listing ==
1. Hadashi no Megami (裸足の女神) - 4:27
2. Kara - Kara - 3:46

== Certifications ==
Region	Certification	Certified units/sales
Japan (RIAJ)	4× Platinum	1,600,000^{^}
^{^} Shipments figures based on certification alone.
