= Action (B'z album) =

Studio album by B'z
- Released: December 5, 2007
- Recorded: 2007
- Genre: Hard rock; pop rock
- Length: 69:32
- Label: Vermillion Records
- Producer: Tak Matsumoto

B'z chronology
Monster (2006)	Action (2007)	Magic (2009)

Singles from Action
- 1. "Eien no Tsubasa" Released: May 9, 2007; 2. "Super Love Song" Released: October 3, 2007

Action is the sixteenth studio album by the Japanese rock duo B'z, released on December 5, 2007. It sold 292,687 copies in its first week, reaching #1 at Oricon.

The song "Friction" was featured in the video game Burnout Dominator and was later on Burnout Paradise, also being the band's first English song to be sold in the US though the iTunes Store. Stone Temple Pilots bassist Robert DeLeo provides bass on the songs "Super Love Song" and "Warui Yume".

== Track listing ==
Professional ratings
Review scores
Source	Rating
Allmusic	3.5/5 stars

1. Junjou Action (純情Action, Pure Action) – 3:05
2. Kuroi Seishun (黒い青春, One's Dark Youth) – 3:47
3. Super Love Song – 3:59
4. Mangetsu yo Terase (満月よ照らせ, Full Moon, Light Me Up) – 3:59
5. Perfect Life (パーフェクトライフ, Paafekuto Raifu) – 3:38
6. Isshinfuran (一心不乱, Absorbed) – 3:25
7. Friction -Lap2- – 3:05
8. One On One – 4:35
9. Boku ni wa Kimi ga iru (僕には君がいる, For Me There Is You) – 5:53
10. Nanto iu shiawase (なんという幸せ, What Happiness) – 4:59
11. Warui Yume (わるいゆめ, Nightmare) – 4:34
12. Hometown Boys' March – 4:26
13. Koubou (光芒, A Beam of Light) – 4:51
14. Travelin' Men no Theme (トラベリンメンのテーマ, Toraberinmen no Teema; Theme of Travelin' Men) – 3:09
15. Ore to Omae no Atarashii Kisetsu (オレとオマエの新しい季節, The New Season for You and I) – 3:30
16. Eien no Tsubasa (永遠の翼, Eternal Wings) – 5:10
17. Buddy – 3:27

== Certifications ==
Region	Certification	Certified units/sales
Japan (RIAJ)	Platinum	250,000^{^}
^{^} Shipments figures based on certification alone.
