= Splash! (song) =

Single by B'z

from the album Monster
- Released: June 7, 2006
- Genre: Hard rock
- Length: 7:28
- Label: Vermillion
- Songwriters: Koshi Inaba; Tak Matsumoto
- Producer: Tak Matsumoto

B'z singles chronology
"Yuruginaimono Hitotsu" (2006)	"Splash!" (2006)	"Eien no Tsubasa" (2007)

"Splash!" is the forty-second single by B'z, released on June 7, 2006. This song is one of B'z many number-one singles on the Oricon chart. "Splash!" was re-recorded in 2012 with English lyrics and released as part of the band's iTunes-exclusive English album.

== Track listing ==
1. "Splash!" – 3:33
2. "MVP" – 3:55

=== Limited edition I ===
1. "Splash!" – 3:33
2. "MVP" – 3:55

CD+DVD "Ai no Bakudan"

=== Limited edition II ===
1. "Splash!" – 3:33
2. "MVP" – 3:55

CD+DVD "Fever"

=== Limited edition III ===
1. "Splash!" – 3:33
2. "MVP" – 3:55

CD+DVD "Pulse"

== Certifications ==
Region	Certification	Certified units/sales
Japan (RIAJ)	Platinum	250,000^{^}
^{^} Shipments figures based on certification alone.
