= Tsubomi (song) =

Single by Kobukuro

from the album 5296
- Released: March 21, 2007
- Recorded: 2007
- Genre: Folk rock
- Length: 6:03
- Label: Warner Music Japan
- Songwriter: Kentarō Kobuchi

Kobukuro singles chronology
"Winding Road" (2007)	"Tsubomi" (2007)	"Aoku Yasashiku" (2007)

"Tsubomi" (蕾 (つぼみ); "Flower Bud") is a song by Japanese folk rock band Kobukuro. It is their 14th single and is included on its ninth studio album 5296. The song was written and composed by Kentarō Kobuchi. The single was released on March 21, 2007, in two editions: a CD-only edition and a limited edition. It debuted at number two on the weekly Oricon Singles Chart before topping the chart the following week, and it was certified double platinum by the Recording Industry Association of Japan (RIAJ), denoting shipment of 500,000 units. "Tsubomi" earned the Grand Prix award at the 49th Japan Record Awards.

== Release and promotion ==
"Tsubomi" was released on March 21, 2007, in two editions: a CD-only edition; and a limited edition which includes a DVD with the short film February 2007 Rehearsal & Live. Marty Friedman pointed out that the song's arrangement was very simple and did away with the influence of the music of the Western culture.

"Tsubomi" was used as the theme song for the television drama Tokyo Tower: Okan to Boku to, Tokidoki, Oton (2007). It was also used as the entrance song for the 80th National High School Baseball Championship the following year.

== Chart performance and accolades ==
"Tsubomi" debuted at number two on the weekly Oricon Singles Chart, selling 182,737 copies in its first week. The single sold 69,737 copies and rose to number one the following week, and was certified platinum by the RIAJ shipment of 250,000 units. For the month of April, "Tsubomi" topped the monthly RIAJ Reco-kyō Chart for ringtones. The single was certified double platinum in June. "Tsubomi" became the third best-selling single on the 2007 Oricon yearly singles chart, selling 441,799 copies in Japan. The single charted for 71 weeks and went on to sell 506,093 copies by the end of its chart run.

At the end of the year, "Tsubomi" earned Kobukuro the Grand Prix award on Tokyo Broadcasting System's 49th Japan Record Awards. On February 20, 2008, the song was certified by the RIAJ for selling three million digital ringtone downloads.

== Cover versions ==
Ayumi Nakamura recorded a cover version of "Tsubomi", which was included on her 2008 cover album Voice. The song was also covered on Kyōko Abe's Yasashī Uta and Shinichi Mori's Love Music.

== Track listing ==
All songs written and composed by Kentarō Kobuchi.

All editions
No.	Title	Length
1.	"Tsubomi (蕾 (つぼみ); Flower Bud)"	6:03
2.	"Kanata e (彼方へ; To the Other Side)"	4:16
3.	"Kazamidori (風見鶏; Weather Vane)"	6:02
4.	"Tsubomi (蕾 (つぼみ); Flower Bud)" (Instrumental)	6:03
5.	"Kanata e (彼方へ; To the Other Side)" (Instrumental)	4:16
6.	"Kazamidori (風見鶏; Weather Vane)" (Instrumental)	6:02

Limited edition
No.	Title	Length
1.	"February 2007 Rehearsal & Live" (short film)

== Chart history ==
Chart (2007)	Peak position
Oricon Singles Chart (Weekly)	1
Oricon Singles Chart (Year-end)	3
RIAJ Reco-kyō Chart	1

Preceded by "Ikken" (Kiyoshi Hikawa)	Japan Record Award Grand Prix; 2007	Succeeded by "Ti Amo" (Exile)
