= The Circle (B'z album) =

Studio album by B'z
- Released: April 6, 2005
- Recorded: 2004–2005
- Studio: Rodeo Recording, Giza Hills Studio, Shian
- Genre: Hard rock; pop rock
- Length: 48:09
- Label: Vermillion
- Producer: Tak Matsumoto

B'z chronology
Big Machine (2003)	The Circle (2005)	Monster (2006)

Singles from The Circle
- 1. "Ai no Bakudan" Released: March 9, 2005

The Circle is the fourteenth studio album by the Japanese rock duo B'z, released on April 6, 2005.

== Track listing ==
1. "The Circle" – 1:57
2. "X" – 3:55
3. "パルス" [Pulse] – 2:45
4. "愛のバクダン" [Ai no Bakudan → Love Bomb] – 4:24
5. "Fly The Flag" – 3:45
6. "アクアブルー" [Aqua Blue] – 3:20
7. "睡蓮" [Suiren → Water Lily] – 4:11
8. "Sanctuary" – 3:43
9. "Fever" – 4:17
10. "白い火花" [Shiroi Hibana → White Spark] – 3:59
11. "イカロス" [Icarus] – 3:32
12. "Black and White" – 4:24
13. "Brighter Day" – 3:57

== Personnel ==
- Tak Matsumoto (guitar)
- Koshi Inaba (vocals)

Additional personnel

- Akihito Tokunaga (bass & programming)
- Brian Tichy (drums) - Track 12
- Shane Gaalaas (drums and percussion)

== Certifications ==
Region	Certification	Certified units/sales
Japan (RIAJ)	2× Platinum	500,000^{^}
^{^} Shipments figures based on certification alone.
