= Banzai (B'z song) =

Single by B'z
- Released: May 5, 2004
- Genre: Hard rock
- Label: Vermillion
- Songwriters: Koshi Inaba; Tak Matsumoto
- Producer: Tak Matsumoto

B'z singles chronology
"Yasei no Energy" (2003)	"Banzai" (2004)	"Arigato" (2004)

"Banzai" is the thirty-sixth single by B'z, released on May 5, 2004. This song is one of B'z many number-one singles on the Oricon chart.

== Track listing ==
1. "Banzai"
2. "Magnolia"

== Certifications ==
Region	Certification	Certified units/sales
Japan (RIAJ)	Platinum	250,000^{^}
^{^} Shipments figures based on certification alone.
