= Monster (B'z album) =

Studio album by B'z
- Released: June 28, 2006
- Recorded: 2005–2006
- Genres: Hard rock; blues rock
- Length: 59:04
- Label: Vermillion Records
- Producer: Tak Matsumoto

B'z chronology
The Circle (2005)	Monster (2006)	Action (2007)

Singles from Monster
- 1. "Ocean" Released: August 10, 2005; 2. "Shōdō" Released: January 25, 2006; 3. "Yuruginaimono Hitotsu" Released: April 12, 2006; 4. "Splash!" Released: June 7, 2006

Monster is the fifteenth studio album by the Japanese rock duo B'z, released on June 28, 2006. The album sold over 401,000 copies in its first week, an improvement from 2005's "The Circle". In total the album sold over 537,091 copies.

== Track listing ==
1. "ALL-OUT ATTACK" - 4:11
2. "SPLASH!" - 3:33
3. "ゆるぎないものひとつ" [Yuruginai Mono Hitotsu] [One Unwavering Thing] - 4:38
4. "恋のサマーセッション" [Koi no SAMA- SESSHON → Koi no SUMMER SESSION] [Love's SUMMER SESSION] - 3:28
5. "ケムリの世界" [KEMURI no Sekai] [World of SMOKE] - 3:05
6. "衝動 ~MONSTER MiX~" [Shoudou ~MONSTER MiX~] [Impulse ~MONSTER MiX~] - 3:16
7. "無言のPromise" [Mugon no Promise] [Wordless Promise] - 4:57
8. "MONSTER" - 4:53
9. "ネテモサメテモ" [NETEMOSAMETEMO] [In Sleeping, and in Waking] - 3:26
10. "Happy Birthday" - 3:54
11. "ピエロ" [PIERO → PIERROT] - 3:13
12. "雨だれぶるーず" [Amadare Buru-zu → Amadare Blues] [Raindrop Blues] - 6:17
13. "明日また陽が昇るなら" [Ashita Mata Hi ga Noboru Nara] [If the Sun Comes Up Again Tomorrow] - 4:52
14. "OCEAN ~2006 MiX~" - 5:26

== Singles ==
=== "Yuruginaimono Hitotsu" ===
"Yuruginaimono Hitotsu"

Single by B'z

from the album Monster
- Released: April 12, 2006
- Genre: Hard rock, pop rock, j-pop
- Length: 7:50
- Label: Vermillion Records
- Songwriters: Koshi Inaba, Tak Matsumoto
- Producer: Tak Matsumoto

B'z singles chronology
"Shoudou" (2006)	"Yuruginaimono Hitotsu" (2006)	"Splash!" (2006)

"Yuruginaimono Hitotsu" was released as the forty-first single by B'z on April 12, 2006, topping being the Oricon charts. The B-side "Pierrot" was also featured on Monster and it has been covered by Aya Kamiki. The song is used as the ending theme in Detective Conan's tenth feature film Detective Conan: The Private Eyes' Requiem.

==== Track listing ====
1. Yuruginaimono Hitotsu (ゆるぎないものひとつ) - 4:37
2. Piero (Pierrot) (ピエロ) - 3:13

==== Certifications ====
Region	Certification	Certified units/sales
Japan (RIAJ)	Platinum	250,000^{^}
^{^} Shipments figures based on certification alone.

== Personnel ==
- Tak Matsumoto (guitar)
- Koshi Inaba (vocals)

== Certifications ==
Region	Certification	Certified units/sales
Japan (RIAJ)	2× Platinum	500,000^{^}
^{^} Shipments figures based on certification alone.
