= Ocean (B'z song) =

Single by B'z

from the album Monster
- Released: August 10, 2005
- Genre: Hard rock
- Length: 12:52
- Label: Vermillion Records
- Songwriters: Koshi Inaba, Tak Matsumoto
- Producer: Tak Matsumoto

B'z singles chronology
"Ai no Bakudan" (2005)	"Ocean" (2005)	"Shōdō" (2006)

"Ocean" is the thirty-ninth single by B'z, released on August 10, 2005. This song is one of the duo's many number-one singles in the Oricon charts, and has sold over 505,000 copies. As B-sides, the single features "Dear My Lovely Pain" and "Narifuri Kamawazu Dakishimete", which is an outtake from The Circle. "Ocean" was used as the theme of Umizaru Evolution, a Japanese television drama adaptation of the manga Umizaru.

The song has received three certifications from the RIAJ: a double platinum shipping certification, a double platinum ringtone download certification and a gold full-length cellphone download certification.

== Track listing ==
1. "Ocean"
2. "Narifuri Kamawazu Dakishimete" (なりふりかまわず抱きしめて)
3. "Dear My Lovely Pain"

== Certifications ==
Region	Certification	Certified units/sales
Japan (RIAJ) Physical single	2× Platinum	500,000^{^}
Japan (RIAJ) Digital single	Platinum	250,000^{*}
Japan (RIAJ) Ringtone	2× Platinum	500,000^{*}
^{*} Sales figures based on certification alone.^{^} Shipments figures based on certification alone.
