= May (song) =

2000 single by B'z

Single by B'z

from the album Eleven
- Released: May 24, 2000
- Genre: Hard rock
- Length: 8:33
- Label: Rooms
- Songwriters: Koshi Inaba; Tak Matsumoto
- Producer: Tak Matsumoto

B'z singles chronology
| "Kon'ya Tsuki no Mieru Oka ni" (2000) | "May" (2000) | "Juice" (2000) |

"May" is the twenty-eighth single by B'z, released on May 24, 2000. This song is one of B'z many number-one singles on the Oricon chart, although sales were not as high as their previous single.

== Track listing ==
1. "May" – 4:19
2. "You Pray, I Stay" – 4:14

== Certifications ==
| Region | Certification | Certified units/sales |
|---|---|---|
| Japan (RIAJ) | Platinum | 400,000^{^} |
^{^} Shipments figures based on certification alone.
