= My Lonely Town =

Single by B'z

from the album Magic
- Released: October 14, 2009
- Genre: Hard rock
- Length: 11:13
- Label: Vermillion Records
- Songwriter(s): Koshi Inaba, Tak Matsumoto
- Producer(s): Tak Matsumoto

B'z singles chronology
"Ichibu to Zenbu/Dive" (2009)	"My Lonely Town" (2009)	"Sayonara Kizu Darake no Hibi yo" (2011)

"My Lonely Town" is the forty-seventh single by B'z, released on October 14, 2009. The single features an original song and a ballad version of the previous single as b-sides. In addition, the single was also released in a limited edition, coming with a DVD with the music video.

Hashima Island, an old deserted mining island in Nagasaki Prefecture which had been recently reopened to visitors after being closed off for 35 years, was used as the location for the filming of the music video. Photos for the CD cover and packaging were also shot there.

The single debuted at the number-one spot on the Japanese daily Oricon Singles Chart, selling about sixty-five thousand copies in one day. On the Oricon weekly charts, the single debuted at No. 1, with the first week sales of 180,723 copies. With the number-one debut, the single became their 43rd number-one single on Oricon weekly charts. It also reached number one on the Billboard Japan Hot 100 and the Top Singles Sales chart.

The Recording Industry Association of Japan certified the single Platinum for its shipment of 250,000 copies.

== Track listing ==
1. My Lonely Town - 3:38
2. Kirei Na Namida (綺麗な涙) - 4:13
3. Ichibu to Zenbu -Ballad Version- (イチブトゼンブ -Ballad Version-) - 3:22

== Certifications ==
Region	Certification	Certified units/sales
Japan (RIAJ)	Platinum	250,000^{^}
^{^} Shipments figures based on certification alone.
