= Ichibu to Zenbu/Dive =

Single by B'z

from the album Magic
- Released: August 5, 2009
- Genre: Hard rock
- Length: 10:43
- Label: Vermillion Records
- Songwriter(s): Koshi Inaba, Tak Matsumoto
- Producer(s): Tak Matsumoto

B'z singles chronology
"Burn: Fumetsu no Face" (2008)	"Ichibu to Zenbu/Dive" (2009)	"My Lonely Town" (2009)

Professional ratings
Review scores
Source	Rating
Allmusic	3/5 stars

"Ichibu to Zenbu/Dive" (イチブトゼンブ／DIVE, lit. "Part and All/Dive") is the forty-sixth single by B'z, released on August 5, 2009, as a double A-side. This is one of the many number-one singles by B'z at Oricon Singles Chart. It was a long hit, staying in the top 5 and the top 10 for 8 consecutives weeks. It also reached number one on the Billboard Japan Hot 100 and the Top Singles Sales chart. On December 10, 2009, it was announced that the single won the "Hot 100 of the Year" award at the Billboard Japan Music Awards.

The single has received several certifications from the Recording Industry Association of Japan. "Ichibu to Zenbu" has been certified for selling more than 1,000,000 ringtones, 750,000 full-length downloads to cellphones and 250,000 downloads to PCs. The physical single was certified platinum for shipped more than 250,000 copies.

Chad Smith, from Red Hot Chili Peppers, and Juan Alderete, from The Mars Volta, guest appeared on this single on the drums and the bass guitar, respectively. The song "Ichibu to Zenbu" was used as the opening theme in the Japanese TV series Buzzer Beat.

== Track listing ==
1. "Ichibu to Zenbu" (イチブトゼンブ, One and All)
2. "Dive"
3. "National Holiday"

== Certifications ==
Region	Certification	Certified units/sales
Japan (RIAJ)	Platinum	250,000^{^}
Japan (RIAJ) Digital single	Million	1,000,000^{*}
Japan (RIAJ) Ringtone	Million	1,000,000^{*}
^{*} Sales figures based on certification alone.^{^} Shipments figures based on certification alone.
