= Southern All Stars =

Japanese rock band

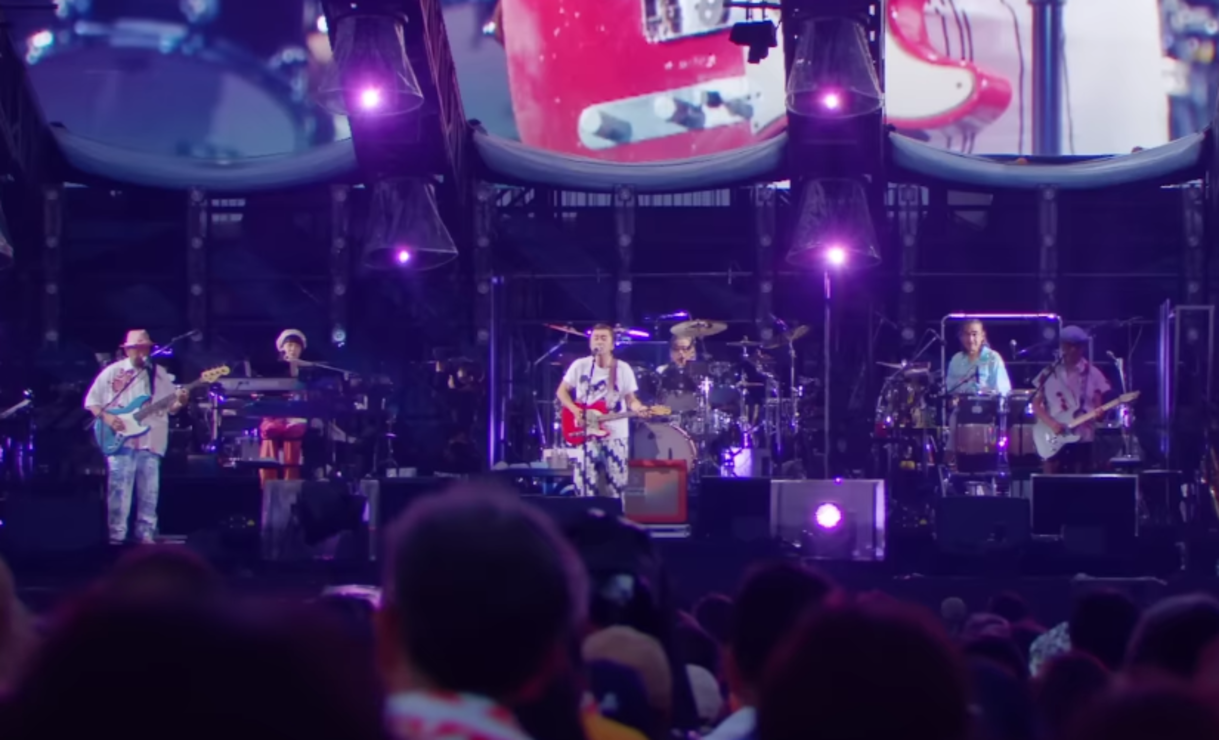
- the Southern All Stars performing in 2023

Background information
- Origin: Shibuya, Tokyo, Japan
- Genres: Rock; pop rock; new wave; kayōkyoku (early)
- Works: Discography
- Years active: 1975–1977; 1977–1985; 1988–2000; 2003–2008; 2013–present
- Label: Victor Entertainment / Taishita
- Members: Keisuke Kuwata; Kazuyuki Sekiguchi; Hiroshi Matsuda; Yuko Hara; Hideyuki Nozawa
- Past members: Takashi Omori
- Website: southernallstars.jp

The Southern All Stars (Japanese: サザンオールスターズ, Hepburn: Sazan Ōru Sutāzu), also known by the abbreviations Southern (サザン, Sazan) and SAS, are a Japanese rock band formed in Shibuya in 1975. Lead vocalist and guitarist Keisuke Kuwata, keyboardist and vocalist Yuko Hara, bassist Kazuyuki Sekiguchi, drummer Hiroshi Matsuda and percussionist Hideyuki Nozawa have been together since 1977. The guitarist Takashi Omori was a member from 1977 to 2001. The band has occasionally gone on hiatus while its members work on other projects.

After signing with Victor Entertainment, the band released their top-ten charting debut single, "Katte ni Sindbad", in 1978. Southern went on to become one of the best-selling music groups in Japan, with more than 48.8 million albums and singles sold. They have had over 40 top ten singles and 19 number one albums on the Oricon music charts. Their 1998 compilation album Umi no Yeah!! is one of the best-selling albums in Japan and the best-selling double album in Japanese history. Southern All Stars are regarded as one of Japan's greatest musical acts and have been called its "national band".

== History ==
=== 1970s: Early years ===
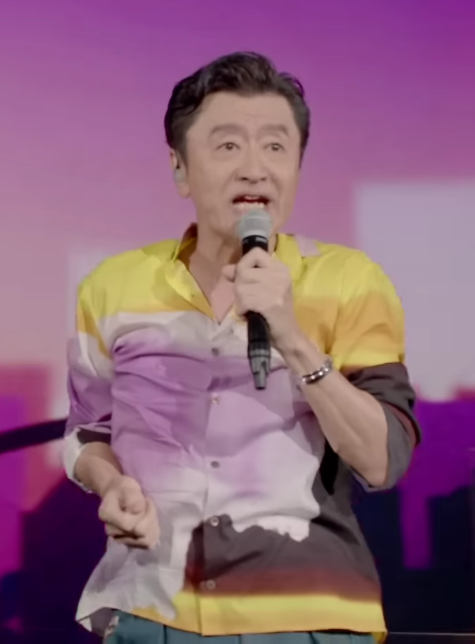
Keisuke Kuwata (pictured in 2022) is the frontman, principal songwriter and leader of Southern All Stars.

In 1974, a prototype of Southern All Stars, composed of Aoyama Gakuin University students who belonged to the popular music club "Better Days", was formed by Keisuke Kuwata. In their early days, the band changed its name frequently, such as "Onsen Anma Momohiki Band" (温泉あんまももひきバンド) and "Piston Kuwata and the Cylinders" (ピストン桑田とシリンダーズ). In 1975, keyboardist Yuko Hara joined the group. Kuwata's friend Junichi Miyaji had the task of creating the poster for the band's April 11, 1976, concert at Fujisawa Youth Hall, but the singer told him the group did not have a name. While working on the poster, Miyaji listened to Neil Young's album After the Gold Rush on repeat, before taking a break to bathe, where he listened to Nippon Broadcasting System and heard Fania All-Stars mentioned. Upon his leaving the bath, the fourth track from Young's album, "Southern Man", was playing. Miyaji took parts of "Fania All Stars" and "Southern Man" to coin the name "Southern All Stars", which he put on the poster without telling Kuwata. The band temporarily disbanded in 1977, only to resume activities later in the year. Southern All Stars participated in the Yamaha EastWest '77 contest, held by the Yamaha Music Foundation. Hiroshi Matsuda and Hideyuki Nozawa, who were not Aoyama Gakuin students, joined them, solidifying the group's lineup. At the contest, Kuwata won a prize for "best vocalist".

On June 25, 1978, their debut single "Katte ni Sindbad" was released by Victor Entertainment. Its title was named after two hit songs in Japan in 1977, "Katte ni Shiyagare" by Kenji Sawada and "Nagisa no Sindbad" by Pink Lady. Additionally, the release date of the debut single was Sawada's 29th birthday. The song features Kuwata's impressive coarse-grained vocals song like a tongue twister. To promote their first single, the band appeared on various TV programs. The unusual outfits they wore and their eccentric performance left an unforgettable impact on listeners. The single gradually climbed the charts and peaked at No. 3 on the Oricon Singles Chart in autumn of the same year.

Because of the promotional material for "Katte ni Sindbad" and the following single "Kibun Shidai de Semenaide", they were considered performers of novelty songs. However, "Itoshi no Ellie", their third single released on March 25, 1979, was sufficient to overturn their comedic public image. This pop-ballad was highly regarded by many Japanese music critics and artists, including Hiroshi Miyagawa and Kosetsu Minami. The song is regarded as one of the most notable songs by the Southern All Stars. In 1988, an English-language cover version by Ray Charles, "Ellie My Love", was featured in a Suntory Limited TV advertisement. It was released as a single in Japan only, and reached No. 3 on the Oricon. This cover version by Charles became 1989's best-selling single performed by a Western artist.

Two months after Southern released their debut single, their first album, Atsui Munasawagi, was released. The band was not able to devote ample time to recording and songwriting for 10 Numbers Carat, their second album. 10 Numbers Carat featured their breakthrough ballad "Itoshi no Ellie", which was released only eight months after their debut album. Kuwata's angry look on the album cover mirrored his exhaustion. Hence, the leader of the band was not satisfied with the quality of the album, and later called it "trash".

=== 1980s: Blockbuster success ===
In February 1980, Southern All Stars started a serial project called "Five Rock Show", where they released a single every month for five months. Due to a lack of promotion, the singles succeeded only moderately. However, thanks to the success of their early singles in the late '70s, they had built a solid fan base. Since Tiny Bubbles, their third album released in 1980, all of their studio albums have topped the Oricon Albums Chart. That album featured two songs featuring vocals by members other than Kuwata, Hara's "Watashi wa Piano" and Matsuda's "Matsuda no Komoriuta". The former was covered by pop singer Mizue Takada that same year and became a top ten hit.

On January 24, 1982, Southern released the single "Chako no Kaigan Monogatari". Kuwata wanted a commercial hit and wrote the song in the typical Japanese kayōkyoku style. Additionally, as a vocalist, he imitated the lisping vocals of Toshihiko Tahara, one of the most popular male idol singers at the time. Such popular expression generally received a favorable reaction from the public and it became the band's most successful single since "Itoshi no Ellie". Following this success, their fifth studio album, Nude Man, was bigger than ever. The album reached No. 3 on Oricon's 1982 year-end chart, and later became that year's best-selling album. One of the highlights of Nude Man, "Natsu o Akiramete" was covered by distinguished comedian and singer Naoko Ken the same year. Her version sold 300,000 copies and became one of her most successful works as a singer.

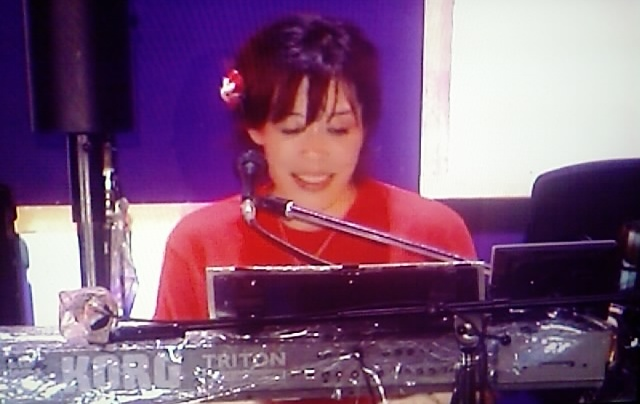
Kuwata and keyboardist Yuko Hara (pictured performing with the band in August 2008) married in 1982.

After the success of "Chako no Kaigan Monogatari", Kuwata married Hara on his 26th birthday. They invited their fans to their wedding ceremony. Throughout Southern's career, Kuwata has featured extremely erotic expressions in many of his self-written songs and the band's sales promotions. "I Love You wa Hitorigoto", a Kuwata composition that was released as Hara's first solo single in 1981, was banned due to suggestive lyrics including the term "motel". The cover of the band's 1983 single "Body Special II" features the breasts of a topless woman. This explicit expression from Kuwata and his band has continued.

The studio albums Kirei and Ninki-mono de Iko were released in 1983 and 1984. Both of them feature mainly adult-oriented rock songs. With "Miss Brand-New Day", a successful single and one of the highlights on Ninki-mono de Iko, the band gradually built up a reputation in the Japanese music industry. In 1985, Southern released the double album Kamakura, which is considered one of their best albums. To promote it, extensive advertisements, including a TV commercial starring distinguished comedian Sanma Akashiya, were used. Such large-scale promotion brought about rumors that the band might break up. In fact, in the process of recording, conflict arose between Kuwata and Sekiguchi. It is said that they devoted over 1,800 hours to the recording of the album, and that the process did not always go smoothly. However, the end product proved overwhelmingly successful and the album was highly praised by critics and listeners alike. When Hara and Kuwata conceived a child that same year, the band temporarily suspended activities. Around 1986, Kuwata began work on solo projects, including the Kuwata Band. Other band members also began various projects.

"Kanashii Kimochi (Just a Man in Love)", Kuwata's successful solo debut single released in 1987, was produced and arranged by Takeshi Kobayashi. Kobayashi started his career in the late '70s, and collaborated with numerous Japanese musicians, including Ryuichi Sakamoto, Yosui Inoue, Taeko Onuki, Hiroshi Takano and Kenji Omori. Through the recording of his solo material, Kuwata recognized Kobayashi's abilities and decided to continue their collaborations. In the late 1980s and the early 1990s, Kobayashi participated in many projects with the members of Southern.

On June 25, 1988, ten years after Southern All Stars debuted, they resumed band activities with the single "Minna no Uta" produced by Kobayashi. Their 1989 single "Sayonara Baby" reached the top of the Oricon Singles Chart, becoming their first No. 1 on that chart. That same year, a 4-CD box-set compilation entitled Suika was released. Despite its size and price, the album reached No. 1 and sold more than 300,000 units.

=== 1990s ===
In the 1990s, the Japanese music industry prospered more than any other decade. Southern All Stars continued to enjoy commercial success and remained one of the mainstream groups of Japanese popular music throughout the 1990s. In 1990, Southern released a self-titled studio album, which became a million-seller. That same year, Kuwata directed a film called Inamura Jane. Although the movie was not well-received, the soundtrack was very successful, reaching No. 1 and selling over one million copies, eventually becoming the best-selling Japanese soundtrack album of all time. "Manatsu no Kajitsu" was released as the lead single from the album and climbed to the top 5 on the charts. In 1991, Hong Kong singer Jacky Cheung covered the ballad in Chinese and enjoyed huge commercial success in several Asian countries. Dozens of other cover versions followed, from Asia to Europe; one being a Tagalog-language version sung by Donna Cruz, entitled "Isang Tanong, Isang Sagot", released in 1997. The soundtrack also included another highlight, "Kibō no Wadachi". Appearing only on the album, the track is well-known as one of Southern's most significant songs.

In 1991, Kazuyuki Sekiguchi left the band temporarily to overcome health problems, not returning until 1995. The next year, 1992, the remaining members released two singles "Shulaba-La-Bamba" and "Namida no Kiss" simultaneously. The latter topped the Oricon Singles Chart for 7 weeks and sold more than 1.5 million copies. It was their first million-selling single and reached the top five on the year-end singles chart for 1992. Two months after the release of those singles, their tenth studio album, Yo ni Manyō no Hana ga Sakunari, was released. Kuwata initially planned to release it as a double album, but eventually omitted some of the songs, including 1991 No. 1 hit single "Neo Bravo!!". The album has sold nearly 1.8 million copies.

In 1993, the remix EP Enoshima was released under the pseudonym project "Z-Dan". It sold more than 900,000 copies and won the 8th Japan Gold Disc Award's "Compilation Album of the Year" prize. That same year, Southern released their second million-selling single "Erotica Seven". The partnership between Kuwata and Kobayashi ended with the band's holiday song "Christmas Love", released as a single in the autumn of 1993. However, the two have occasionally collaborated since, such as on Kuwata and Mr. Children's successful charity single "Kiseki no Hoshi", released in 1995.

Throughout 1994, Kuwata worked as a solo artist again, and Southern released no new material. The band restarted the following year, with "Mampy no G-Spot", an obscene song released only as a single. It marked the return of Sekiguchi, who had left the band in 1991. "Anatadake o -Summer Heartbreak-", the other song released in 1995, provided the group with their 3rd million-selling single. Kuwata would later cite "Summer Heartbreak" as one of his favorite songs. The next year, the band released two singles, "Ai no Kotodama -Spiritual Message-" and "Taiyō wa Tsumi na Yatsu", with the former selling over a million copies. Young Love, their 11th album, featured successful singles, including two million-sellers, has sold more than 2.5 million copies to become one of the best-selling albums of 1996. It has remained the band's most successful studio album to date.

=== 2000–present: "Tsunami" and Omori's departure ===
On January 26, 2000, their 44th single, "Tsunami" was released. It was used as the theme song of Mirai Nikki III, a popular part of the TBS program called Un-nan no Hontoko!, and made a strong impression on many people. The song held the No. 1 position on the Oricon Singles Chart for five weeks, and sold more than 2.9 million units. It is the third best-selling single in Japan of the last 40 years. On New Year's Eve 2000, "Tsunami" won the 42nd Japan Record Awards. After the enormous success of the single, the band became more conservative and now release fewer singles, although all of them have become hits.

After a concert tour in 2000, Takashi Omori announced a stop in work and left the band in August 2001. Omori and his wife were well-known as pious and influential adherents of the Soka Gakkai religion. This caused various rumors in the press about problems between himself and other members and many fans. By the early 2000s, each member had actively pursued solo projects. Particularly, Kuwata produced three million-selling records and one album around 2001 and 2002.

Southern All Stars released the double-album Killer Street in October 2005. It debuted at No. 1 and has sold over a million units to date. In 2008, the band began a hiatus. In 2010, Kuwata revealed that he had been diagnosed with early-stage esophageal cancer. He suspended all musical activities and successfully underwent surgery. After five years, Southern All Stars resumed activities on June 25, 2013.

Southern All Stars released the studio album Budō in 2015, and the compilation album Umi no Oh Yeah! in 2018. Digital remastered versions of all 15 of their studio albums were released towards the end of 2024, leading up to the release of their 16th, Thank You So Much, in March 2025.

== Musical style ==
Music journalist Tomoyuki Mori and critic Nobuaki Onuki both described Southern All Stars' music as taking aspects from diverse genres, such as rock, blues, Latin, folk and reggae, and successfully adapting them to their own unique style. HMV Japan wrote that the band has been able to lead the Japanese music industry for decades because they repeatedly take fresh approaches that evolve with the times.

Dr. Patrick Patterson of Honolulu Community College notes that principal songwriter Kuwata uses Japanese vocabulary in unique ways in his lyrics, which requires even native speakers to listen closely to fully understand, and will also intentionally mispronounce words to make them sound like English or French. Discussing their song "Omoisugoshi mo Koi no Uchi", music critic Suzie Suzuki wrote that Kuwata sings "a bizarre jumble of Japanese and English, spoken rapidly with a rolling tongue, incorporating vowels beyond the standard 'a, i, u, e, o', and emphasizing the hard consonant sounds of the 'ka' and 'ta' columns." Suzuki described this as evolving the vocal styles of artists like Eiichi Ohtaki and Eikichi Yazawa. Onuki opined that Kuwata's way of placing importance on the way words sound instead of their meaning succeeded domestically because the Japanese people had already acquired a taste for foreign music sung in languages they do not understand.

== Legacy ==
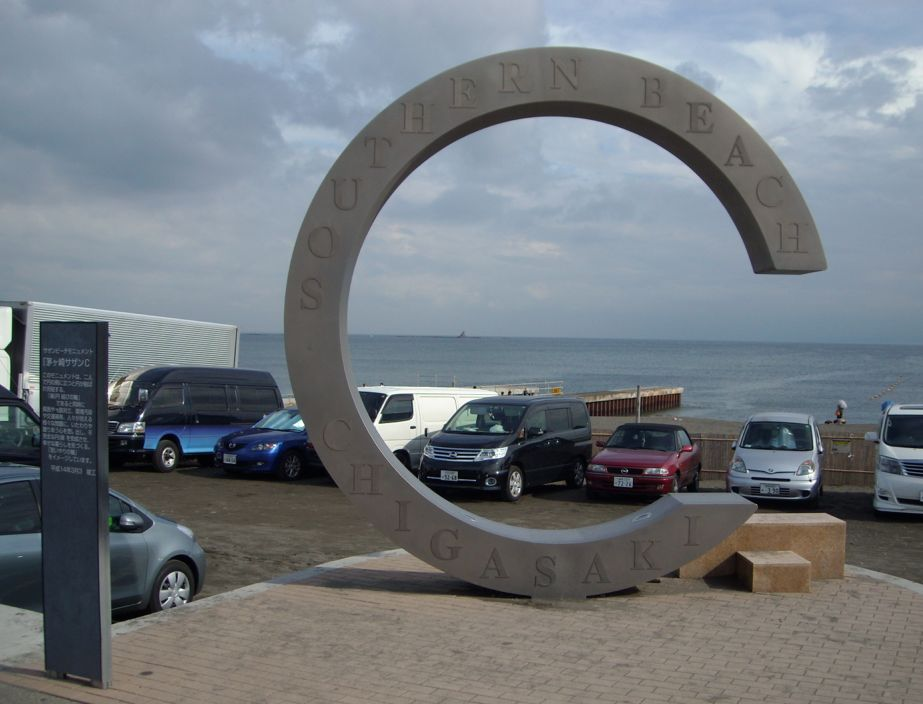
Southern Beach in Chigasaki was named after Southern All Stars.

Southern All Stars are regarded as one of Japan's greatest musical acts, they have been called the country's "national band", a national treasure, and the "spiritual holyland" for the Japanese people. HMV Japan ranked them No. 1 on their 2003 list of the "Top 100 Japanese Musical Acts". In 2007, Rolling Stone Japan ranked their 1984 album Ninki-mono de Iko at No. 32 on a list of the "100 Greatest Japanese Rock Albums of All Time". In 2019, Nikkei Entertainment! magazine ranked Southern All Stars second in the music category of their annual "Talent Power Rankings". Southern Beach in Kuwata's hometown of Chigasaki was named after Southern All Stars in 1999. Chigasaki officials have credited Southern All Stars for boosting the city's profile. In 2013, Kenzo Tanaka, President of the Chigasaki Chamber of Commerce and Industry, stated, "Through numerous hit songs, such as 'Chako no Kaigan Monogatari', they have incorporated the name of Chigasaki in their lyrics, thereby contributing to the local economy." In October 2014, the East Japan Railway Company began using Southern's song "Kibō no Wadachi" as a departure melody at Chigasaki Station. Specifically, the song's intro is used on platform 5 and its chorus on platform 6.

Southern All Stars are also one of the best-selling music groups in Japan, selling more than 48.8 million albums and singles by 2015. Their 1998 compilation album Umi no Yeah!! has sold more than 4.8 million copies, making it one of the best-selling albums of all time in Japan and the best-selling double album in Japanese history. They have had over 40 top ten singles and 19 number one albums on Japan's Oricon music charts. In July 2005, they became the only artist to ever have 44 songs chart in the top 100 on the Oricon Singles Chart simultaneously. In 2025, Southern became only the fifth act in history, and the only group, to have had a number one album on the Oricon Albums Chart in five separate decades.

Suzuki credits Southern All Stars and Kuwata with creating a methodology for fitting the Japanese language into rock music, with expanding the lyrical landscape within the rock genre, and with establishing rock music as a viable business. On the first achievement, he wrote that Kuwata used "every trick in the book" to fit Japanese on top of rock music in a way that "felt both natural and exhilarating", and called it one of the most monumental contributions in the history of Japanese rock vocals, as every artist since has taken from his style and that of RC Succession frontman Kiyoshiro Imawano. For the second accomplishment, Suzuki opined that Kuwata has the most diverse lyrical themes of any musician in history, writing that although love songs occupy the heart of his lyrics, his work also includes themes of nonsense and eroticism, comic songs and "message songs". Explaining the last achievement, Suzuki wrote that despite being radical, as seen in the first two, Southern All Stars and Kuwata never failed to be accessible to the masses, which he believes accounts for their enduring popularity.

== Band members ==
Current members

- Keisuke Kuwata – vocals, guitar (1975–1977, 1977–1985, 1988–2000, 2003–2008, 2013–present)
- Kazuyuki Sekiguchi – bass (1975–1977, 1977–1985, 1988–1991, 1995–2000, 2003–2008, 2013–present)
- Hiroshi Matsuda – drums (1975–1977, 1977–1985, 1988–2000, 2003–2008, 2013–present)
- Yuko Hara – keyboards, vocals (1975–1977, 1977–1985, 1988–2000, 2003–2008, 2013–present)
- Hideyuki Nozawa – percussion (1975–1977, 1977–1985, 1988–2000, 2003–2008, 2013–present)

Former members

- Takashi Omori – guitar (1975–1977, 1977–1985, 1988–2000)

== Discography ==
Studio albums

- Atsui Munasawagi (1978)
- 10 Numbers Carat (1979)
- Tiny Bubbles (1980)
- Stereo Taiyo-zoku (1981)
- Nude Man (1982)
- Kirei (1983)
- Ninki-mono de Iko (1984)
- Kamakura (1985)
- Southern All Stars (1990)
- Inamura Jane (1990)
- Yo ni Manyō no Hana ga Sakunari (1992)
- Young Love (1996)
- Sakura (1998)
- Killer Street (2005)
- Budō (2015)
- Thank You So Much (2025)

== Awards ==
Year	Ceremony	Award	Work
1978	Japan Cable Awards	New Artist Award	
1979	Japan Record Awards	Best Album	10 Numbers Carat
1981	Japan Record Awards	Ten Albums	Stereo Taiyo-zoku
1982	Japan Record Awards	Best Album	Nude Man
1982	Japan Record Awards	Ten Albums	Nude Man
1983	Japan Record Awards	Best Album	Kirei
1983	Japan Record Awards	Ten Albums	Kirei
1984	Japan Record Awards	Excellent Albums	Ninki-mono de Iko
1985	Japan Record Awards	Excellent Albums	Kamakura
1990	Japan Gold Disc Award	Artist of the Year	
1990	Japan Record Awards	Best Rock Vocals Award	"Manatsu no Kajitsu"
1990	Japan Record Awards	Rock Gold Disc Award	"Manatsu no Kajitsu"
1990	Japan Record Awards	Excellent Albums	Southern All Stars
1992	34th Japan Record Awards	Grand Prix	"Yo ni Manyō no Hana ga Sakunari"
1992	34th Japan Record Awards	Excellent Work Award	"Yo ni Manyō no Hana ga Sakunari"
1992	34th Japan Record Awards	Gold Disc Award	"Namida no Kiss"
2000	42nd Japan Record Awards	Grand Prix	"Tsunami"
2000	42nd Japan Record Awards	Excellent Work Award	"Tsunami"
2014	56th Japan Record Awards	Excellent Music Award	"Tokyo Victory"
2015	57th Japan Record Awards	The Best Album Award	Budō
2018	60th Japan Record Awards	Special Award	
2018	MTV VMAJ	SAS Lifetime Achievement Award Japan	
2019	Japan Gold Disc Award	Album of the Year	Umi no Oh, Yeah!!
2019	Space Shower Music Awards	Best Respect Artist	

== See also ==
- List of best-selling music artists in Japan
