= Ring (B'z song) =

2000 single by B'z

Single by B'z

from the album Eleven
- Released: October 4, 2000
- Genre: Hard rock
- Label: Rooms
- Songwriters: Koshi Inaba; Tak Matsumoto
- Producer: Tak Matsumoto

B'z singles chronology
"Juice" (2000)	"Ring" (2000)	"Ultra Soul" (2001)

"Ring" is the thirtieth single by B'z, released on October 4, 2000. This song is one of B'z many number-one singles on the Oricon chart. It was the theme song for the drama Asu o Dakishimete. The single was less successful, charting only at number 37 on the 2000 year-end Oricon chart, with 546,000 copies sold in its seven weeks of charting. It became also their first single since "Itoshii Hitoyo Good Night..." to sell less than 600,000 copies.

== Track listing ==
1. "Ring" – 4:02
2. "Guilty" – 3:28

== Certifications ==
Region	Certification	Certified units/sales
Japan (RIAJ)	Platinum	400,000^{^}
^{^} Shipments figures based on certification alone.
