= Ultra Soul =

Single by B'z

from the album Green
- Released: March 14, 2001
- Genre: Hard rock
- Label: Rooms
- Songwriters: Koshi Inaba; Tak Matsumoto
- Producer: Tak Matsumoto

B'z singles chronology
"Ring" (2000)	"Ultra Soul" (2001)	"Gold" (2001)

"Ultra Soul" is the thirty-first single by B'z, released on March 14, 2001. This song is one of B'z many number-one singles on the Oricon chart. As B-Sides, the single features "Rock Man" and "Suima-Yo 2001!!", a remix of the song "Suima-Yo!!" previously released on the album Survive. "Ultra Soul" was featured in the arcade drumming game Taiko no Tatsujin 2, sequel to the first version of the game that featured another B'z song, "Atsuki Kodō no Hate". This song was featured in the International Television Intro of 2001 FINA World Aquatics Championships.

In 2011, the song was certified digitally by the RIAJ as a gold single for being downloaded more than 100,000 times to cellphones since its release as a digital download in early 2005.

A re-recorded version of the song titled "ultra soul 2011" appears on their 2011 album C'mon.

The song appears in Rocksmith 2014 for the guitar and bass.

The same year of its release, the song was adopted as an entrance theme by professional wrestler Masayuki Naruse, and it became strongly associated with him during his stint in New Japan Pro-Wrestling. Naruse himself was nicknamed "Ultra Soul" due to it.

== Track listing ==
1. "Ultra Soul"
2. "Suima-Yo 2001!!" (スイマーよ 2001!!)"
3. "Rock Man"

== Certifications ==
Region	Certification	Certified units/sales
Japan (RIAJ) Physical single	2× Platinum	800,000^{^}
Japan (RIAJ) Digital single	Platinum	250,000^{*}
^{*} Sales figures based on certification alone.^{^} Shipments figures based on certification alone.
