= Green (B'z album) =

Studio album by B'z
- Released: July 3, 2002
- Recorded: 2001–2002
- Genre: Hard rock; pop rock
- Length: 45:11
- Label: Vermillion Records
- Producer: Tak Matsumoto

B'z chronology
Eleven (2000)	Green (2002)	Big Machine (2003)

Singles from Green
- 1. "Ultra Soul" Released: March 14, 2001; 2. "Atsuki Kodō no Hate" Released: June 5, 2002

Green is the twelfth studio album by the Japanese rock duo B'z, released on July 3, 2002. The album sold 800,120 copies in its first week, about 40,000 copies more than previous studio album Eleven and sold 1,131,788 copies overall.

Green became the first release following Rooms Records changing its name to Vermillion Records.

== Track listing ==
1. "Stay Green ~Mijyuku na Tabi wa Tomaranai~ – 3:08
2. "熱き鼓動の果て" [Atsuki Kodō no Hate] – 4:05
3. "Warp" – 3:48
4. "Signal" – 4:17
5. "Surfin' 3000GTR" – 3:47
6. "Blue Sunshine" – 3:49
7. "Ultra Soul" – 3:38
8. "美しき世界" [Utsukushiki Sekai] – 4:42
9. "Everlasting" – 3:38
10. "Forever Mine" – 3:38
11. "The Spiral" – 3:26
12. "Go★Fight★Win" – 3:15

== Personnel ==
- Tak Matsumoto (guitar)
- Koshi Inaba (vocals)

== Certifications ==
Region	Certification	Certified units/sales
Japan (RIAJ)	3× Platinum	1,200,000^{^}
^{^} Shipments figures based on certification alone.
