= Eien no Tsubasa =

Single by B'z

from the album Action
- Released: May 9, 2007
- Genre: Hard rock
- Label: Vermillion Records
- Songwriter(s): Koshi Inaba, Tak Matsumoto
- Producer(s): Tak Matsumoto

B'z singles chronology
"Splash!" (2006)	"Eien no Tsubasa" (2007)	"Super Love Song" (2007)

"Eien no Tsubasa" is the forty-third single by B'z, released on May 9, 2007. It reached number-one on the weekly Oricon Singles Chart, one of B'z many number-one singles in Oricon charts.

== Track listing ==
1. Eien no Tsubasa (永遠の翼) - 5:11
2. Ronrii Sutaazu (Lonely Stars) (ロンリースターズ) - 4:49

== Certifications ==
Region	Certification	Certified units/sales
Japan (RIAJ)	Platinum	250,000^{^}
^{^} Shipments figures based on certification alone.
