= Kobukuro =

Japanese band

Kobukuro コブクロ
- Origin: Osaka, Japan
- Genres: Folk rock; pop; ambient rock
- Years active: 1998–present
- Labels: Minosuke Records; Warner Music Japan
- Members: Kentarō Kobuchi; Shunsuke Kuroda
- Website: www.kobukuro.com

Kobukuro (コブクロ) is a Japanese rock band formed in 1998. The name is a portmanteau of the two members' family names, Kentarō Kobuchi and Shunsuke Kuroda.

== Members ==
- Kentarō Kobuchi (小渕健太郎, Kobuchi Kentarō; b. March 13, 1977); guitar, vocals, various other instruments)
- Shunsuke Kuroda (黒田俊介, Kuroda Shunsuke; b. March 18, 1977); main vocals)

The duo's visual appearance is striking due to their height difference, with Kuroda standing over 193 cm (6 ft 4 in) tall. As a group, they are known for their harmonies.

== History ==
In May 1998, Kobuchi and Kuroda met each other in Sakai near Osaka. Kobuchi was a salesman who held street concerts every Saturday for relaxation and Kuroda was a physical education teacher and a street musician. In September the same year, Kobuchi offered Kuroda a song and, seeing that Kuroda was not a skilled guitar player, Kobuchi became the guitar player of the group. Thus, Kobukuro was formed.

Kobukuro received moderately successful ratings for their first three indie albums—Saturday 8:PM (July 1999), ANSWER (December 2000) and Root of My Mind (March 2001). Kobukuro signed with Warner Music Japan in 2001, and made their debut with the hit single, "Yell" which reached number 4 on the Oricon Charts.

Kobukuro released the studio album Nameless World on December 21, 2005. Nameless World became their first number-one album on the Oricon weekly charts. On September 27, 2006, they released their greatest hits album All Singles Best, which topped the Oricon weekly charts for four consecutive weeks.

On March 21, 2007, Kobukuro released the single "Tsubomi." Musician Marty Friedman stated that the song's simple arrangement did away with the musical influence of Western culture. The song became their first number-one single on the Oricon weekly charts. "Tsubomi" won the coveted "Grand Prix" awards in December 2007 at the 49th Japan Record Awards. The song was included in their 2007 studio album 5296, which also topped the Oricon weekly charts.

On their 2009 album Calling, Kobuchi wrote "Sayonara Hero" as a memorial song for Kiyoshiro Imawano, who had died earlier that year. On March 3, 2010, they released their cover version of "Layla" (used in a Pepsi Nex commercial they starred in) as a digital single of iTunes Store without the release of a physical CD.

On May 17, 2010, the sales of All Singles Best passed 3,000,000 copies on the Oricon charts, becoming the first album to do so in 7 years and 10 months, since the 2002 achievement of Southern All Stars' Umi no Yeah!!, originally released on June 25, 1998.

== Discography ==
=== Singles ===
| Title | Release date | Peak chart positions | | Sales |
| Title | Release date | Oricon | Japan Hot 100 | Sales |
|---|---|---|---|---|
| "Yell (Yell)/Bell" (YELL〜エール〜/Bell) | March 21, 2001 | 4 | × | 245,390 |
| "Rut" (轍-わだち-) | June 20, 2001 | 15 | × | 53,430 |
| "You/Miss You" | Nov 11, 1998 | 30 | × | 22,360 |
| "Wind" (風) | February 13, 2002 | 25 | × | 120,000 |
| "Poetry of a Wish/Sun" (願いの詩/太陽) | July 10, 2002 | 14 | × | 37,620 |
| "Town Without Snow" (雪の降らない街) | November 13, 2002 | 16 | × | 27,988 |
| "Treasure Island" (宝島) | April 9, 2003 | 11 | × | 24,482 |
| "Blue Blue" | August 27, 2003 | 20 | × | 16,134 |
| "Door" | May 12, 2004 | 15 | × | 20,083 |
| "Together Forever/Million Films" (永遠にともに/Million Films) | October 14, 2004 | 6 | × | 146,265 |
| "A Flower That Only Blooms Here" (ここにしか咲かない花) | May 11, 2005 | 2 | × | 407,200 |
| "Cherry Blossom" (桜) | November 2, 2005 | 3 | × | 434,389 |
| "Name of Your Wings" (君という名の翼) | July 26, 2006 | 5 | × | 106,957 |
| "Tsubomi" (蕾 (つぼみ)) | March 21, 2007 | 1 | × | 506,093 |
| "Bluer, Gentler" (蒼く 優しく) | November 7, 2007 | 2 | × | 213,961 |
| "Footsteps of Time" (時の足音) | October 29, 2008 | 2 | 2 | 255,485 |
| "Rainbow" (虹) | April 15, 2009 | 2 | 1 | 102,577 |
| "Stay" | July 15, 2009 | 3 | 1 | 86,290 |
| "Meteor" (流星) | November 17, 2010 | 3 | 2 | 113,503 |
| "Blue Bird" | February 16, 2011 | 3 | 2 | 78,224 |
| "My Hope, the Sun Will Continue to Light up the World" (あの太陽が、この世界を照らし続けるように。) | April 27, 2011 | 3 | 2 | 48,093 |
| "Paper Plane" (紙飛行機) | November 28, 2012 | 2 | 2 | / |
| "One Song from Two Hearts/Diamond" (One Song From Two Hearts/ダイヤモンド) | July 24, 2013 | 3 | 7 | / |
| "Now, the Flowers Bloom in Full Glory" (今、咲き誇る花たちよ) | February 19, 2014 | 7 | 4 | 19,277 |
| "Sunny Road" (陽だまりの道) | June 4, 2014 | 6 | 5 | 40,028 |
| "Sotsugyō" (卒業) | March 18, 2020 | 3 | — | 23,257 |
"—" denotes releases that did not chart or were not released in that region. "×" denotes periods where charts did not exist or were not archived.

=== Albums ===
| Released | Title | Peak | Sales |
|---|---|---|---|
| July 21, 1999 | Saturday 8PM | — | - |
| March 4, 2000 | Root of My Mind | 197 | - |
| December 19, 2000 | Answer | — | - |
| August 29, 2001 | Roadmade | 6 | 105,000 |
| August 28, 2002 | Grapefruits | 4 | 100,000 |
| November 6, 2003 | Straight | 10 | 46,000 |
| November 3, 2004 | Music Man Ship | 3 | 250,000 |
| December 21, 2005 | Nameless World | 1 | 898,000 |
| September 27, 2006 | All Singles Best | 1 | 3,038,000 |
| December 19, 2007 | 5296 | 1 | 1,429,000 |
| August 5, 2009 | Calling | 1 | 477,000 |
| August 25, 2010 | All Covers Best | 1 | 387,000 |
| September 5, 2012 | All Singles Best 2 | 1 | 731,217 |

== Awards ==
| Year | Ceremony | Award | Work |
|---|---|---|---|
| 2002 | Japan Gold Disc Award | New Artist of the Year | |
| 2005 | Japan Record Awards | Gold Award | Sakura |
| 2006 | Japan Record Awards | Gold Award | Kimi to Iu Na no Tsubasa |
| 2006 | Japan Gold Disc Award | Rock & Pop Album of the Year | NAMELESS WORLD |
| 2007 | Japan Record Awards | Grand Prix | Tsubomi |
| 2007 | Japan Record Awards | Gold Award | Tsubomi |
| 2007 | Japan Gold Disc Award | Album of the Year | All Singles Best |
