= Shōdō =

Single by B'z

from the album Monster
- Released: January 25, 2006
- Genre: Hard rock
- Length: 7:23
- Label: Vermillion Records
- Songwriters: Koshi Inaba, Tak Matsumoto
- Producer: Tak Matsumoto

B'z singles chronology
| "Ocean" (2005) | "Shōdō" (2006) | "Yuruginaimono Hitotsu" (2006) |

"Shōdō" is the fortieth single by B'z, released on January 25, 2006. This song is one of B'z many number-one singles in Oricon charts. The title track was used as the seventeenth opening theme of Case Closed.

== Track listing ==
1. Shōdō (衝動, Lit., Compulsion) - 3:17
2. Kesshō (結晶, Lit., Crystal) - 4:08

== Music video ==
- The title Shōdō shares the same pronunciation as shodo, the Japanese art of calligraphy. The music video features Japanese calligrapher Sōun Takeda writing the title in kanji.

== Certifications ==
| Region | Certification | Certified units/sales |
|---|---|---|
| Japan (RIAJ) | Platinum | 250,000^{^} |
^{^} Shipments figures based on certification alone.
