= 5296 =

Studio album by Kobukuro
- Released: December 19, 2007
- Genres: Pop, folk
- Length: 73:04
- Label: Warner Music Japan
- Producer: Kobukuro

Kobukuro chronology
All Singles Best (2006)	5296 (2007)	Calling (2009)

Professional ratings
Review scores
Source	Rating
AllMusic	3.5/5 stars
Amazon Japan	4.5/5 stars
HMV	3.5/5 stars
Oricon Music	(90/100)

5296 is Kobukuro's 7th album released under Warner Music Japan, released on December 19, 2007.

== Track listing ==
1. Aoku Yasashiku (蒼く 優しく)
2. Coin (コイン)
3. Tsubomi (蕾)
4. Donna Sora demo (どんな空でも)
5. Kimi to Iu Na no Tsubasa (君という名の翼)
6. White Days
7. Kimiiro (君色)
8. Suimen no Chō (水面の蝶)
9. Kaze no Naka o (風の中を)
10. Gekkō (月光)
11. Kazamidori (風見鶏)
12. Diary
13. Fragile Mind

== Release history ==
Country	Date
Japan	December 19, 2007
Taiwan	December 20, 2007
Hong Kong	December 19, 2007
