= Juice (B'z song) =

2000 single by B'z

Single by B'z

from the album Eleven
- Released: July 12, 2000
- Genre: Hard rock
- Length: 7:44
- Label: Rooms
- Songwriters: Koshi Inaba; Tak Matsumoto
- Producer: Tak Matsumoto

B'z singles chronology
"May" (2000)	"Juice" (2000)	"Ring" (2000)

"Juice" is the twenty-ninth single by B'z, released on July 12, 2000. This song is one of B'z's many number-one singles on the Oricon chart. Although sales weren't as high as their previous single (about 650,000 copies), it is well known among fans, being usually played live. It was also often used as a tie-up on TV.

== Track listing ==
1. "Juice" – 4:02
2. "Ubu" – 3:42

== Certifications ==
Region	Certification	Certified units/sales
Japan (RIAJ)	Platinum	400,000^{^}
^{^} Shipments figures based on certification alone.
