= It's Showtime! (B'z song) =

Single by B'z

from the album Big Machine
- Released: March 26, 2003
- Genre: Hard rock
- Length: 7:57
- Label: Vermillion
- Songwriters: Koshi Inaba; Tak Matsumoto
- Producer: Tak Matsumoto

B'z singles chronology
"Atsuki Kodou no Hate" (2002)	"It's Showtime!" (2003)	"Yasei no Energy" (2003)

"It's Showtime!!" is the thirty-fourth single by B'z, released on March 26, 2003. This song is one of B'z many number-one singles on the Oricon chart.

== Track listing ==
1. "It's Showtime!!" – 4:00
2. "New Message" – 3:57

== Certifications ==
Region	Certification	Certified units/sales
Japan (RIAJ)	2× Platinum	500,000^{^}
^{^} Shipments figures based on certification alone.
