= B'z The Best "Ultra Treasure" =

Compilation album by B'z
- Released: September 17, 2008
- Genre: Hard rock
- Label: Vermillion Records
- Producer: Tak Matsumoto

B'z chronology
B'z The Best "Ultra Pleasure" (2008)	B'z The Best "Ultra Treasure" (2008)	B'z The Best XXV 1988-1998/B'z The Best XXV 1999-2012 (2013)

B'z The Best "Ultra Treasure" is a compilation album by the Japanese hard rock duo B'z. It was released on September 17, 2008, and it is part of their 20th anniversary celebration. The album track listing was decided by fans who voted on a poll at the B'z 20th anniversary website. The fans could vote for all but three songs that have ever been released by B'z. "Brotherhood" was voted number one.

== Track listing ==
_{All tracks by B'z}

=== Disc 1 ===
1. "Blowin'" -Ultra Treasure Style- – 3:57
2. "Wonderful Opportunity" – 4:38
3. "Mou Ichido Kiss Shitakatta" [もう一度キスしたかった] – 4:39
4. "Time" – 4:57
5. "Koi-Gokoro" [恋心(KOI-GOKORO)] – 3:48
6. "Run" – 3:52
7. "Sayonara Nankawa Iwasenai" [さよならなんかは言わせない] – 4:29
8. "Gekkou" [月光] – 5:31
9. "Koi Janaku Naru Hi" [恋じゃなくなる日] – 4:50
10. "Don't Leave Me" – 4:23
11. "Love Is Dead" – 5:48
12. "Haru" [春] – 5:39
13. "Motel" – 4:23
14. "You & I" – 4:07
15. "Yumemi Ga Oka" [夢見が丘] – 4:41
16. "Kienai Niji" [消えない虹] – 3:37

=== Disc 2 ===
1. "Brotherhood" – 5:44
2. "Swimmer-Yo!!" [スイマーよ!!] – 3:19
3. "Happiness" [ハピネス] – 4:51
4. "One" – 4:10
5. "F･E･A･R" -2008 Mix- – 3:46
6. "Nagai Ai" [ながい愛] – 5:35
7. "Rock Man" – 3:50
8. "Devil" – 3:35
9. "New Message" – 3:37
10. "Arakure" [アラクレ] – 3:26
11. "Yuruginai Mono Hitotsu" [ゆるぎないものひとつ] – 4:37
12. "Pierrot" [ピエロ] – 3:12
13. "Burn" -Fumetsu no Feisu- [Burn -フメツノフェイス-] – 3:50
14. "Home" (※ English Lyrics ver.) – 4:08
15. "Glory Days" (グローリーデイズ) – 4:26

=== Disc 3 ===
1. "Itsuka Mata Kokode" (いつかまたここで) – 5:34

== Personnel ==
- Tak Matsumoto (松本 孝弘) – producer, guitarist
- Koshi Inaba (稲葉 浩志) – vocalist

== Charts ==
Oricon Sales Chart (Japan)

Chart	Peak position	First week sales	Sales total
Oricon Daily Albums Chart	1		
Oricon Weekly Albums Chart	1	413,038	611,172
Oricon Monthly Albums Chart	2		
Oricon Yearly Albums Chart	16		
Billboard Japan Top Albums	1		

== Certifications ==
Region	Certification	Certified units/sales
Japan (RIAJ)	2× Platinum	500,000^{^}
^{^} Shipments figures based on certification alone.
