= Atsuki Kodō no Hate =

Single by B'z

from the album Green
- Released: June 5, 2002
- Genre: Hard rock
- Label: Vermillion Records
- Songwriter(s): Koshi Inaba, Tak Matsumoto
- Producer(s): Tak Matsumoto

B'z singles chronology
"Gold" (2001)	"Atsuki Kodō no Hate" (2002)	"It's Showtime!!" (2003)

"Atsuki Kodō no Hate" (熱き鼓動の果て) is the thirty-third single by B'z, released on June 5, 2002. This song is one of B'z many number-one singles on the Oricon chart. The song was featured in the arcade drumming game Taiko no Tatsujin and also on the Nintendo DS rhythm game Osu! Tatakae! Ouendan.

== Promotion ==
It was used by TV Asahi as the theme song of the TV Asahi Network Sports, Pan Pacific Swimming Yokohama 2002, and WRC World Rally. In Brazil, it was also used by Rede Bandeirantes as the theme song of the FIFA World Cup Qatar 2022, which is played during the tournament.

== Track listing ==
1. "Atsuki Kodō no Hate" (熱き鼓動の果て)
2. "Yoru yo Akenaide" (夜よ明けないで)
3. "Idomeyo Hakanai Konotoki ni" (挑めよ儚いこの時に)

== Personnel ==
- Tak Matsumoto – electric guitar
- Koshi Inaba – lead vocals
- Hideo Yamaki – drums (on track 1)
- Shane Gaalaas – drums (on track 2)
- Akihito Tokunaga – bass guitar (on tracks 1 and 3)
- Billy Sheehan – bass guitar (on track 2)
- Daisuke Ikeda – arrangement

== Certifications ==
Region	Certification	Certified units/sales
Japan (RIAJ)	Platinum	400,000^{^}
^{^} Shipments figures based on certification alone.
