= Super Love Song =

Single by B'z

from the album Action
- Released: October 3, 2007
- Genre: Hard rock
- Length: 11:06
- Label: Vermillion Records
- Songwriters: Koshi Inaba, Tak Matsumoto
- Producer: Tak Matsumoto

B'z singles chronology
"Eien no Tsubasa" (2007)	"Super Love Song" (2007)	"Burn -Fumetsu no Face-" (2008)

"Super Love Song" is the forty-fourth single by B'z, released on October 3, 2007. The song peaked at number one on the Oricon Charts, and is B'z 40th consecutive number one single, with 180,650 sales. The following week it dropped to #3. The B-side "Friction" was featured on the racing games Burnout Dominator and Burnout Paradise.

== Track listing ==
1. Super Love Song - 3:59
2. From Here (ここから, Kokokara) - 4:01
3. Friction - 3:06

== Personnel ==
- Tak Matsumoto - Electric guitar
- Koshi Inaba - Lead vocals
- Jeremy Colson - Drums (on tracks 1 and 2)
- Shane Gaalaas - Drums (on track 3)
- Robert DeLeo - Bass (on tracks 1 and 2)
- Patrick Warrend - Mellotron (on track 2)
- Akihito Tokunaga - Bass (on track 3)
- Akira Onozuka - Organ (on track 1), Piano (on track 2).
- Tama Strings - Strings

== Certifications ==
Region	Certification	Certified units/sales
Japan (RIAJ)	Platinum	250,000^{^}
^{^} Shipments figures based on certification alone.
