= Ai no Bakudan =

Single by B'z

from the album The Circle
- Released: March 9, 2005
- Genre: Hard rock
- Label: Vermillion
- Songwriter(s): Koshi Inaba; Tak Matsumoto
- Producer(s): Tak Matsumoto

B'z singles chronology
"Arigato" (2004)	"Ai no Bakudan" (2005)	"Ocean" (2005)

"Ai no Bakudan" is the thirty-eighth single by B'z, released on March 9, 2005. This song is one of B'z many number-one singles on the Oricon chart.

The song was re-recorded in 2012 with English lyrics and released as "Love Bomb" as part of the band's iTunes-exclusive English album.

== Track listing ==
1. "Ai no Bakudan" (愛のバクダン)
2. "Fever"
3. "Amaku Yasashii Binetsu" (甘く優しい微熱)
4. "Ai no Bakudan" (TV style)
5. "Ai no Bakudan" (guitar solo-less)

== Certifications ==
Region	Certification	Certified units/sales
Japan (RIAJ) Physical single	Platinum	250,000^{^}
Japan (RIAJ) Digital single (english ver.)	Gold	100,000^{*}
^{*} Sales figures based on certification alone.^{^} Shipments figures based on certification alone.
