= Kon'ya Tsuki no Mieru Oka ni =

2000 single by B'z

Single by B'z

from the album Eleven
- Released: February 9, 2000
- Genre: Hard rock
- Label: Rooms
- Songwriter(s): Koshi Inaba: Tak Matsumoto
- Producer(s): Tak Matsumoto

B'z singles chronology
"Giri Giri Chop" (1999)	"Kon'ya Tsuki no Mieru Oka ni" (2000)	"May" (2000)

"Kon'ya Tsuki no Mieru Oka ni" (meaning 'At the Hill Where We Can See the Moon Tonight') is the twenty-seventh single by B'z, released on February 9, 2000. This song is one of B'z many number-one singles on the Oricon chart, and sold over a million copies, with 1,129,000 copies sold. It was used as the main theme for the TV drama Beautiful Life.

In 2011, the song was certified digitally by the RIAJ as a gold single for being downloaded more than 100,000 times to cellphones since its release as a digital download in early 2005.

== Track listing ==
1. "Kon'ya Tsuki no Mieru Oka ni" (今夜月の見える丘に)
2. "Dakara Sono Te wo Hanashite" (Mixture style) (だからその手を離して -Mixture style-)

== Personnel ==
- Tak Matsumoto – electric guitar
- Koshi Inaba – lead vocals
- Hideo Yamaki – drums (on track 1)
- Kaichi Kurose – drums (on track 2)
- Koji "Kitaroh" Nakamura – bass guitar (on track 1)
- Shoutarou Mitsuzono – bass guitar (on track 2)
- Onozuka Akira – piano

== Certifications ==
Region	Certification	Certified units/sales
Japan (RIAJ)	3× Platinum	1,200,000^{^}
Japan (RIAJ) Full-length ringtone	Gold	100,000^{*}
^{*} Sales figures based on certification alone.^{^} Shipments figures based on certification alone.
