= TMG II =

Studio album by Tak Matsumoto Group
- Released: September 18, 2024
- Recorded: March–June 2024
- Studios: Birdman West (Tokyo); NRG Recording Studios (Los Angeles); Arby69 (Los Angeles); Asano Taiko U.S. (Los Angeles); Daniel Ho Creations (Los Angeles)
- Genre: Hard rock
- Length: 43:55
- Labels: Vermillion (Japan); Frontiers (Europe)
- Producer: Tak Matsumoto

Tak Matsumoto Group chronology
| TMG I (2004) | TMG II (2024) |

TMG II is the second studio album by the Japan-based supergroup Tak Matsumoto Group, released on September 18, 2024, by Vermillion Records. It was later released in Europe by Fronters Music on December 6, who also released the band's first album, TMG I, in that region in 2004. Along with the core lineup of guitarist and leader Tak Matsumoto, vocalist Eric Martin, and bassist Jack Blades, drummer Matt Sorum (of Guns N' Roses and Velvet Revolver fame) and frequent B'z collaborator Yukihide "YT" Takiyama appeared as studio and live support.

The album was released in three editions: a regular version, a limited edition featuring a metal plate with the members' autographs and pictures, and a premium edition featuring a Blu-ray with a performance from their 2004 tour, Dodge the Bullet.

The album debuted at No. 3 on both the Oricon Weekly Albums Chart and the Billboard Japan Hot Albums chart.

== Background ==
Ever since the completion of the group's first run in 2004, there had been talks of a reunion, but it was difficult to match everyone's schedules. Finally, in November 2022, guitarist Tak Matsumoto contacted vocalist Eric Martin and bassist Jack Blades about reforming, and they agreed. Work started on the album in 2024, but due to Martin and Blades being on tour with Mr. Big and Night Ranger, respectively, they recorded their parts separately between March and June.

On February 28, 2024, in an interview with Rockpages.gr, Blades revealed that the band would be reforming and make a second album. A week later, on March 8, the band officially announced its reformation 20 years after its initial conception and would be releasing a second album and hold a nationwide tour across Japan.

On April 19, the band unveiled details about the tour, TMG Live 2024: Still Dodging the Bullet, which would have nine dates across Japan, ending at the Tokyo Garden Theater. It was also announced that, alongside the members, Matt Sorum would be the drummer and Yukihide "YT" Takiyama would provide additional guitar. The tour started on September 19, the day after the album came out.

On July 25, the album was officially announced, including the title, TMG II, recording lineup, and ten tracks. Additional features would include Babymetal, who Matsumoto had previously collaborated with on the song "Da Da Dance", on the song "Eternal Flames", and Daniel Ho, who previously released a collaboration album with Matsumoto titled Electric Island, Acoustic Sea. An eleventh track, "The Story of Love" featuring Lisa, was later announced, which is a rearrangement of her song "Another Great Day!!" from her mini-album Ladybug, which Matsumoto provided the music for.

== Promotion ==
On August 30, "Crash Down Love" was released to radio, first appearing on FM802 "Rock On" in Japan. Later, on September 11, both "Eternal Flames" and "Guitar Hero" were released in advance on streaming platforms; they each debuted at No. 25 and No. 29 on the Oricon Weekly Digital Singles chart, respectively.

On September 13, they appeared on Music Station 2-Hour Special where they performed "Guitar Hero", "Eternal Flames", and "Da Da Dance" with Babymetal. On September 15, they again performed "Eternal Flames" and "Da Da Dance" with Babymetal on TV Asahi Dream Festival 2024.

Just like with the first album, listening parties were held on September 14 and 15 at the Hard Rock Cafes in Tokyo and Osaka. The members made a surprise appearance at the September 15 event in Tokyo, where they also held a press conference.

== Critical reception ==
TMG II ratings
Review scores
| Source | Rating |
|---|---|
| Metal Temple | 8/10 |

Upon release, TMG II received mixed reviews from music critics. In a positive review, Alex Sales of Metal Temple praised the musicianship, calling it "top notch", in particular Matsumoto's playing and Martin's vocals. He also praised the songs, saying, "All songs in this album are meticulously crafted and the arrangements are well thought out with melodies that will stick in your head". Sakis Nikas of Rockpages.gr was more modest, again praising musicianship and production but lamented the songs don't live up to the first album, stating that "the songs don’t have that catchy and uplifting character of the first album" and that the album as a whole was "just slightly below our high expectations." Despite that, he said the album overall was "a good release with some remarkable songs, fantastic production, [and] flawless performance". In a more negative review, Michel van de Moosdijk of Headbangers Lifestyle again gave praise to the musicianship but criticized the songs. While he spoke positively of "Crash Down Love", "Guitar Hero", and "The Great Divide", of the others, he said, "the rest of the material is hardly what you call spectacular or exciting. It is more that the band is going through the motions with rather mediocre songs that are predictable and rather boring." He concluded that the album "is rather a disappointing affair" and stated that the group's reunion is a "prime example" of one that doesn't work out.

== Track listing ==
All music is composed by Tak Matsumoto.

TMG II track listing
| No. | Title | Lyrics | Length |
|---|---|---|---|
| 1. | "Crash Down Love" | Jack Blades | 4:28 |
| 2. | "Eternal Flames" (featuring Babymetal) | Blades | 3:04 |
| 3. | "The Story of Love" (featuring Lisa) | Eric Martin, André Pessis | 5:00 |
| 4. | "Color in the World" | Blades | 3:23 |
| 5. | "Jupiter and Mars" | Blades | 3:35 |
| 6. | "My Life" | Martin, Pessis | 3:41 |
| 7. | "Endless Sky" | Martin, Pessis | 3:52 |
| 8. | "Dark Island Woman" | Blades | 3:38 |
| 9. | "Faithful Now" | Blades | 5:16 |
| 10. | "The Great Divide" | Martin, Pessis | 3:21 |
| 11. | "Guitar Hero" | Blades | 4:37 |
| Total length: | | | 43:55 |

TMG Live 2004: Dodge the Bullet at Zepp Tokyo track listing
| No. | Title | Writer(s) | Length |
|---|---|---|---|
| 1. | "Everything Passes Away" | Matsumoto, Blades |
| 2. | "I Wish You Were Here" | Matsumoto, Blades, Martin |
| 3. | "Signs of Life" | Matsumoto, Blades |
| 4. | "Trapped" | Matsumoto, Martin, Blades |
| 5. | "I Know You by Heart" | Matsumoto, Martin, Blades |
| 6. | "Train, Train" | Matsumoto, Martin, Pessis |
| 7. | "Red, White and Bullet Blues" | Matsumoto, Martin, Pessis |
| 8. | "Blue" (Tak's Solo) | Matsumoto |
| 9. | "Two of a Kind" | Matsumoto, Blades |
| 10. | "Wonderland" | Matsumoto, Martin, Pessis |
| 11. | "The Greatest Show on Earth" | Matsumoto, Martin, Pessis |
| 12. | "Kings for a Day" | Matsumoto, Martin, Tony Fanucchi, Pessis |
| 13. | "Never Good-Bye" | Matsumoto, Blades |
| 14. | "(You Can Still) Rock in America" | Blades, Brad Gillis |
| 15. | "To Be with You" | Martin, David Grahame |
| 16. | "Oh Japan (Our Time Is Now)" | Matsumoto, Martin, Blades |

== Personnel ==
Credits are adapted from the liner notes.

Tak Matsumoto Group

- Tak Matsumoto – guitars, background vocals on "Crash Down Love", "Jupiter and Mars", and "My Life"
- Eric Martin – lead vocals
- Jack Blades – bass, background vocals
- Matt Sorum – drums, percussion on tracks 1, 3, 6, 9–10, background vocals on "Jupiter and Mars"

Additional musicians

- Yukihide "YT" Takiyama – background vocals
- Daniel Ho – kane on "The Story of Love" and "Endless Sky", koto and sanshin on "The Story of Love" and "Jupiter and Mars", taiko on "The Story of Love", "Jupiter and Mars", and "Endless Sky"
- Jeff Babko – piano on tracks 1–7, 9, organ on tracks 2, 4, 6–8, 11, Wurlitzer and Mellotron on "Color in the World" and "Faithful Now", clavinet on "The Great Divide"
- Erina Sato with Lime Ladies Orchestra – strings on "Color in the World"
- Babymetal – vocals on "Eternal Flames"
- Lisa – vocals on "The Story of Love"

Production

- Tak Matsumoto – production, arrangement
- Yukihide "YT" Takiyama – arrangement
- Hiroyuki Kobayashi – recording, mixing
- Jin Murakawa – recording (vocals)

TMG Live 2004: Dodge the Bullet at Zepp Tokyo lineup

- Tak Matsumoto – guitars
- Eric Martin – lead vocals, guitar on "To Be with You"
- Jack Blades – bass, vocals, co-lead vocals on "Everything Passes Away", lead vocals on "(You Can Still) Rock in America"
- Chris Frazier - drums

== Charts ==
=== Weekly charts ===
Weekly chart performance of TMG II
| Chart (2024) | Peak position |
|---|---|
| Japanese Albums (Oricon) | 3 |
| Japanese Combined Albums (Oricon) | 4 |
| Japanese Hot Albums (Billboard Japan) | 3 |
| Japanese Top Albums Sales (Billboard Japan) | 3 |

=== Monthly chart ===
Monthly chart performance of TMG II
| Chart (2024) | Position |
|---|---|
| Japanese Albums (Oricon) | 17 |

== Release history ==
Release dates and formats for TMG II
| Date | Country | Formats | Label | Ref. |
|---|---|---|---|---|
| September 18, 2024 | Japan | CD; CD + Goods; CD + Blu-ray | Vermillion | |
| September 18, 2024 | Worldwide | Digital download; streaming | Vermillion (Japan); Frontiers (Outside Japan) | |
| December 6, 2024 | Europe | CD; vinyl | Frontiers | |
