= Electric Island, Acoustic Sea =

Studio album by Tak Matsumoto & Daniel Ho
- Released: February 8, 2017
- Genre: Jazz, rock
- Length: 53:57
- Label: Daniel Ho Creations, House of Strings, Vermillion Records

Tak Matsumoto chronology
enigma (2016)	Electric Island, Acoustic Sea (2017)

Daniel Ho chronology
Between the Sky & Prairie (2017)	Electric Island, Acoustic Sea (2017)

Electric Island, Acoustic Sea is a collaborative studio album by Grammy Award-winning musicians Tak Matsumoto (Japanese guitarist of B'z fame) and Daniel Ho (American multi-instrumentalist). The album debuted at #7 on the Oricon weekly album chart and at #6 on the Billboard Japan album chart. "Island of Peace" and "Rain" are re-recordings of songs previously released in Matsumoto's 2014 solo album New Horizon.

== Track listing ==
No.	Title	Music	Length
1.	"Soaring on Dreams"	Daniel Ho	5:31
2.	"Fujiyama Highway"	Tak Matsumoto	4:08
3.	"Magokoro (True Heart)"	Ho	5:01
4.	"Infinite Escapade"	Ho	4:45
5.	"Faithfully" (Journey cover; lyrics by Jonathan Cain)	Jonathan Cain	3:28
6.	"Sunny Tuesday"	Matsumoto	3:29
7.	"Wander Blues"	Matsumoto	3:46
8.	"Adrenaline UP!"	Matsumoto, Ho	4:00
9.	"Omotesando"	Matsumoto	4:45
10.	"Island of Peace"	Matsumoto	5:19
11.	"Rain"	Matsumoto	5:40
12.	"Lia"	Ho	4:05
Total length:			53:57

== Personnel ==
- Tak Matsumoto – electric guitar, arrangement on tracks 2, 6–11
- Daniel Ho – vocals on "Faithfully"; 12-string guitar on "Soaring on Dreams"; rhythm guitar on "Soaring on Dreams" and "Magokoro (True Heart)"; acoustic guitar on tracks 5, 8, 7, 9 and 12; bass on tracks 1, 4, 5 and 6; sanshin on "Fujiyama Highway"; Ukulele on "Fujiyama Highway" and "Sunny Tuesday"; tenor & soprano ukulele on "Island of Peace"; piano on tracks 1, 3, 4, 10 and 11; keyboard on tracks 1, 3 and 4; electric piano on "Omotesando"; triangle on "Infinite Escapade"; cymbal on "Infinite Escapade"; udu on "Sunny Tuesday" and "Rain"; uriuri on "Sunny Tuesday"; ipu heke on tracks 6, 10 and 11; shaker on "Sunny Tuesday" and "Rain"; Chinese cymbal on "Adrenaline UP!"; caxixi on "Island of Peace"; cha-cha on "Island of Peace" and "Rain"; talking drum, bongos, China cymbal and wood rattle on "Island of Peace"; arrangement on tracks 1, 3, 4, 5, 6, 8, 10–12

=== Session members ===
- Steve Billman – bass on tracks 2–7 and 9, fretless bass on "Magokoro (True Heart)"
- Barry Sparks – bass on "Rain"
- David Enos – wood bass on "Island of Peace"
- Randy Drake – drums on tracks 1–4 and 6–9; taiko on tracks 2, 7, 8 and 11; agogô on "Fujiyama Highway"; güiro and tambourine on "Fujiyama Highway"
- Hiroko Ishikawa with Lime Ladies Orchestra – strings on "Island of Peace"
- Dana Xue – cello on "Magokoro (True Heart)" and "Adrenaline UP!"
- June Kuramoto – koto on tracks 2, 4, 8 and 11
- Hideyuki Terachi – arrangement on tracks 2, 7 and 9
