= Enigma (Tak Matsumoto album) =

Album by Takahiro Matsumoto

enigma

Studio album by Tak Matsumoto
- Released: April 27, 2016
- Genres: Jazz fusion, hard rock
- Length: 68:52 (with bonus track)
- Label: Being Inc.

Tak Matsumoto chronology
New Horizon (2014)	enigma (2016)	Electric Island, Acoustic Sea (w/ Daniel Ho) (2017)

enigma is the eleventh solo studio album by Japanese guitarist Tak Matsumoto, of B'z. It is mostly an instrumental album (except for the title track, its reprise, "Drifting", "Hopes", "Under the Sun" and "#1090 ~Million Dreams~") and it was released by Being Inc. on April 27, 2016, in Japan. The album debuted at #4 on the Oricon weekly album chart and at #18 on the Billboard Japan album chart.

Matsumoto first mentioned an upcoming solo effort during Wowow's live coverage of the 2016 Grammy Awards, in which he was a guest. "Vermillion Palace" and "Mystic Journey" are the opening and ending themes of Tokyo Broadcasting System Television's show The WORLD Heritage, respectively. "Ups and Downs" is the theme to an Ukiyo-e exhibition in the Bunkamura Museum in Tokyo.

== Track listing ==
All music is composed by Tak Matsumoto.

No.	Title	Length
1.	"enigma"	5:51
2.	"Vermillion Palace"	4:26
3.	"Step to Heaven"	4:30
4.	"Ups and Downs"	3:47
5.	"Rock the Rock"	4:40
6.	"Drifting"	4:44
7.	"The Voyage"	5:06
8.	"Hopes"	4:24
9.	"Under the Sun"	4:46
10.	"Dream Drive"	5:34
11.	"The Rock Show"	4:05
12.	"Roppongi Noise"	4:14
13.	"Mystic Journey"	5:16
14.	"enigma ~epilogue~"	2:13
15.	"#1090 ~Million Dreams~" (bonus track, a reworked version of "#1090 ~Thousand Dreams~", which had for long been the theme song of TV Asahi's Music Station)	5:17
Total length:		68:52

=== Limited edition bonus CD & DVD/CD & blu-ray ===
All tracks taken from Tak Matsumoto LIVE 2014 -New Horizon-.

1. "Take 5"
2. "BLUE"
3. "Hana"
4. "Tokyo Night"
5. "Shattered Glass"
6. "Gakuseigai no Kissaten"
7. "Island of peace"
8. "That's Cool"
9. "Tsuki no Akari"
10. "Reason to be..."
11. "GO FURTHER"
12. "#1090"
13. "The Moment"
14. "Rodeo Blues"

== Personnel ==
- Tak Matsumoto - guitars on all tracks, arrangements

=== Session members ===
- Mark Renk – vocals on tracks 1, 6, 8, 9 and 14
- Joey McCoy – rap vocals on "#1090 ~Million Dreams~"
- Greta Karen – chorus on "#1090 ~Million Dreams~"
- Sean Hurley – bass on all tracks except 1, 3, 13 and 15; wood bass on 14
- Juan Alderete – bass on "Vermillion Palace" and "Step to Heaven"
- Barry Sparks – bass on "Mystic Journey"
- Travis Carlton – bass on "#1090 ~Million Dreams~"
- Jeff Babko – organ on tracks 3, 8 and 10; Rhodes piano on "Roppongi Noise"
- Akira Onozuka – Rhodes piano on "The Voyage", piano on "Under the Sun" and "Mystic Journey"
- Jason Sutter – drums on all tracks except 1, 5, 10, 11, 13 and 15
- Brian Tichy – drums on tracks 1, 5, 10 and 11
- Shane Gaalaas – drums on "Mystic Journey" and "#1090 ~Million Dreams~"
- Hiroko Ishikawa with Lime Ladies Orchestra – strings on tracks 2, 6, 7 and 13
- Jimmy Z Zavala – harp on "Dream Drive"
- Greg Vail – tenor saxophone solo on "Rock the Rock", "Dream Drive" and "Roppongi Noise"
- Watanabe Fire – saxophone on "Rock the Rock" and "Dream Drive"
- Kaoru Sakuma and Osamu Ueishi – trumpet on "Rock the Rock" and "Dream Drive"
- Azusa Tojo – trombone on "Rock the Rock" and "Dream Drive"
