= Grammy Award for Best Hawaiian Music Album =

Honor presented to recording artists for Hawaiian music albums

- Awarded for: Quality Hawaiian music albums
- Country: United States
- Presented by: National Academy of Recording Arts and Sciences
- First award: 2005
- Final award: 2011
- Website: grammy.com

The Grammy Award for Best Hawaiian Music Album was an honor presented to recording artists from 2005 to 2011 for quality Hawaiian music albums. The Grammy Awards, an annual ceremony that was established in 1958 and originally called the Gramophone Awards, are presented by the National Academy of Recording Arts and Sciences of the United States to "honor artistic achievement, technical proficiency, and overall excellence in the recording industry, without regard to album sales or chart position".

Campaigning resulted in the Hawaiian category's establishment in 2005. Prior to its creation, Hawaiian music recordings were eligible for the Best World Music Album category but no Hawaiian musician or group had ever won a Grammy Award. During its seven-year history, awards were presented to Charles M. Brotman for Slack Key Guitar: Volume 2, producers Daniel Ho, Paul Konwiser and Wayne Wong for Masters of Hawaiian Slack Key Guitar: Volume One, the same production team plus George Kahumoku, Jr. for Legends of Hawaiian Slack Key Guitar: Live from Maui in 2007 followed by Treasures of Hawaiian Slack Key Guitar in 2008, and Masters of Hawaiian Slack Key Guitar: Volume 2 in 2010, Tia Carrere and Ho for Ikena, and Carrere for Huana Ke Aloha in 2011. Eligible recordings had to feature the Hawaiian language on "more than half of its vocal tracks", though instrumental albums were also acceptable. Awards were presented to the engineers, mixers, and/or producers in addition to the performing artists.

Daniel Ho holds the record for the most wins, with five. Four-time recipients include Paul Konwiser and Wayne Wong as producers. George Kahumoku, Jr. earned three awards as a producer, and Tia Carrere earned two as a performing artist. Ho also holds the record for the most nominations, with seven. Amy Hānaialiʻi Gilliom holds the record for the most nominations without a win, with five. Six of the seven Grammy-winning albums were released through the record label Daniel Ho Creations. In 2011, the Recording Academy announced the retirement of the award category. Beginning in 2012, Hawaiian music recordings were eligible for the Best Regional Roots Music Album category.

== Background ==
For decades prior to the creation of the Best Hawaiian Music Album category, advocates for Hawaiian music took issue with recordings only being eligible for the Best World Music Album category. Advocates included musicians, record labels, government officials, and the Seattle-based Pacific Northwest Chapter of the National Academy of Recording Arts and Sciences. No Hawaiian musician or group had been awarded a Grammy prior to the establishment of the Hawaiian Music category. One obstacle to the category's creation was defining Hawaiian music, and the eligibility requirements, in terms of music stylings and language restrictions. There has been conflict between traditional and Western-influenced Hawaiian music, mostly pertaining to the use of the slack-key guitar, an instrument invented in Hawaii but commercialized by "mainlanders". According to Academy representative Bill Freimuth, the category was designed "for recordings of a more traditional nature". Requiring the use of Hawaiian language on more than half of its vocal tracks encouraged the recognition of traditional music, but instrumental albums (such as the compilation album honored at the 47th Grammy Awards) circumvented this requirement.

== History ==
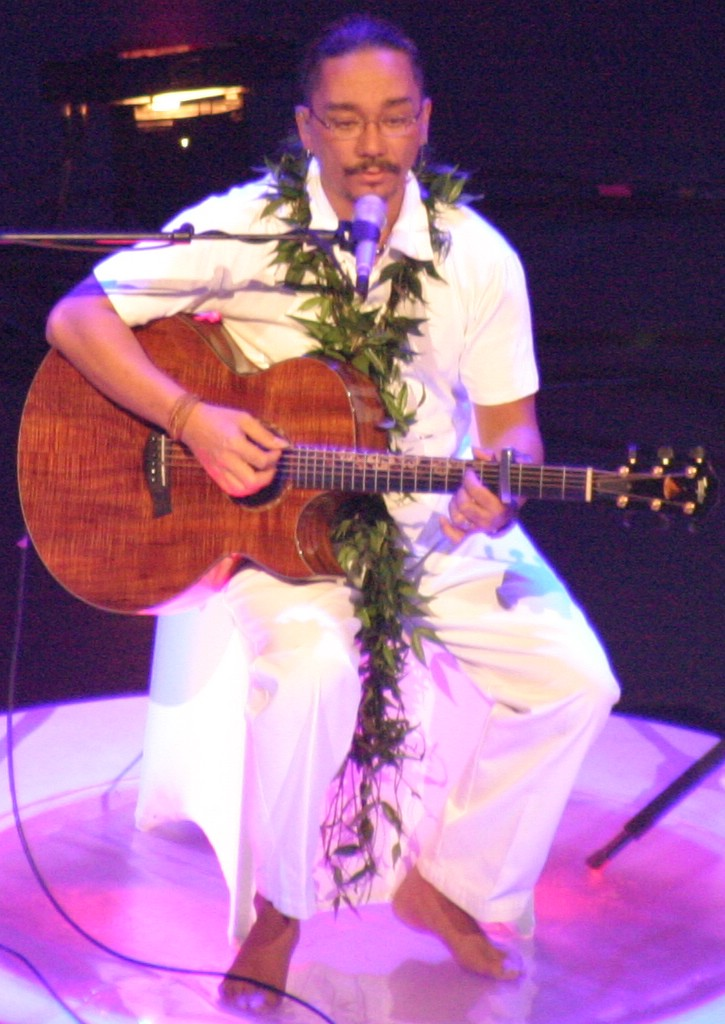
2005 nominee Kealiʻi Reichel

Nominees for the 47th Grammy Awards (2005) included: The Brothers Cazimero for Some Call It Aloha... Don't Tell, producer Charles M. Brotman for Slack Key Guitar: Volume 2, Ho'okena for Cool Elevation, Amy Hānaialiʻi Gilliom, and arranger and multi-instrumentalist Willie K (born William Kahaialiʻi) for Amy & Willie Live, and Kealiʻi Reichel for Keʻalaokamaile. Hanaialiʻi and Reichel both expressed happiness at being nominated, the latter stating, "This is the culmination of the work of chanters, singers and poetry writers that dates back over a thousand years." One NPR contributor wrote that the nominees illustrated the range of Hawaiian music at the time, "from traditional songs for guitar and ukulele to more modernized approaches". Some Call It Aloha... Don't Tell contained traditional Hawaiian folk songs and chants and the use of traditional instruments such as the acoustic bass and 12-string guitar. Hoʻokena members Many Boyd, Horace K. Dudoit III, Chris Kamaka and Glen H.K. Smith created music for Cool Elevation using the ukulele, acoustic bass, and guitar. Scott Iwasaki of the Deseret News described Amy & Willie Live as a "playful array of Hawaiian jazz". Ke'alaokamaile, a concept album about Reichel's immediate ancestors, combines traditional Hawaiian chants with original songs. The album also included contemporary covers of Babyface's "You Were There", Karla Bonoff's "Goodbye My Friend", and Sting's "Fields of Gold". The award went to Brotman for the slack key guitar compilation album recorded in Hawaii and described by journalist Nate Chinen as "an easy-listening instrumental compilation seemingly tailored to mainland tastes". According to Jon de Mello, founder of Hawaiian record label Mountain Apple Company, other nominees' "jaws dropped on the ground" at the ceremony in reaction to their works being overlooked. Chinen claimed the Academy's "safe, bland" choice set a precedent for compilations and slack key use (five nominees the following year were slack key albums).

2006 nominee Sonny Lim

For the 48th Grammy Awards (2006), nominees included: Kapono Beamer for Slack Key Dreams of the Ponomoe, Raiatea Helm for Sweet & Lovely, Ledward Kaapana for Kiho'alu: Hawaiian Slack Key Guitar, Sonny Lim for Slack Key Guitar: The Artistry of Sonny Lim, and Daniel Ho, Paul Konwiser and Wayne Wong for Masters of Hawaiian Slack Key Guitar: Volume One. Allmusic's Adam Greenberg described Slack Key Dreams of the Ponomoe as an ambient album with an "easy listening" sound accented with slack key motives. Songs about Beamer's family and childhood were sung in Hawaiian but also English. Sweet & Lovely featured "classic, early tourist-era" Hawaiian music and guest performances by Kealiʻi Reichel and Auntie Genoa Keawe. Greenberg complimented Helm for her ukulele playing and "stunning" falsetto. Lim's first solo album contained slack key compositions fused with "touches of folk and possibly even adult contemporary stylings". Masters of Hawaiian Slack Key Guitar, which peaked at number fifteen on Billboard's Top World Music Albums chart, featured twelve live tracks recorded from the weekly slack key guitar concerts that took place in Maui. Awards were presented to Ho, Konwiser and Wong as producers of the compilation album. Peter deAquino, George and Keoki Kahumoku, and Garrett Probst joined producers Ho and Wong on stage at the podium during the pre-telecast ceremony to accept the award.

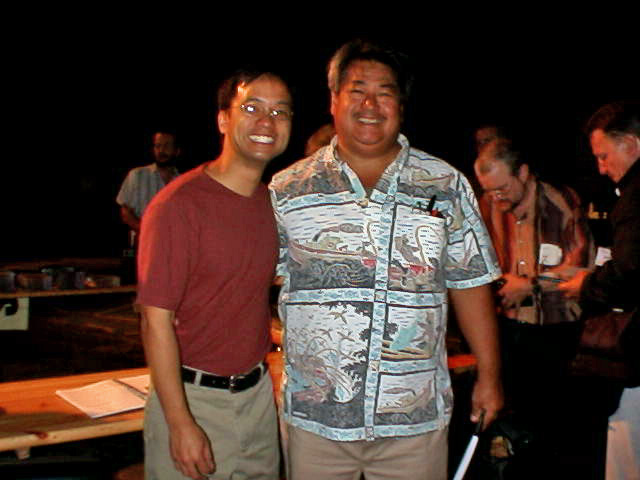
Grammy winners George Kahumoku Jr. and Daniel Ho

2007 nominees included: Amy Hānaialiʻi Gilliom for Generation Hawai'i, producers Daniel Ho, George Kahumoku Jr., Paul Konwiser and Wayne Wong for the compilation album Legends of Hawaiian Slack Key Guitar: Live from Maui, Ledward Kaapana for Grandmaster Slack Key Guitar, Henry Kapono for The Wild Hawaiian, and producers Chris and Milton Lau for the compilation album Hawaiian Slack Key Kings. Generation Hawai'i and The Wild Hawaiian were the two vocal-driven albums nominated, while the three remaining nominees were slack-key driven. The Wild Hawaiian consisted of rock songs in Hawaiian which drew sound comparisons to Jimi Hendrix and Carlos Santana. Awards were presented to Daniel Ho, George Kahumoku Jr., Konwiser and Wong. Ho, Konwiser and Wong became the first multiple recipients in the category as well as the first consecutive award recipients. Musicians Peter deAquino, Richard Ho'opi'i, Kaapana, and Garrett Probst of Da Ukulele Boys, all of whom contributed live tracks to the album, joined the producers on stage to perform "Hawaii Aloha" a cappella for the audience and to accept the award. Kahumoku's acceptance speech stressed the importance of funding public arts and music education, earning him a standing ovation from the audience.

Nominees for the 50th Grammy Awards (2008) included: Keola Beamer for Ka Hikina O Ka Hau (The Coming of the Snow), Tia Carrere for Hawaiiana, Raiatea Helm for Hawaiian Blossom, Cyril Pahinui for He‘eia, and previous award recipients Ho, Kahumoku, Konwiser and Wong for Treasures of Hawaiian Slack Key Guitar. For Ka Hikina O Ka Hau, Beamer layers multiple guitars in different tunings to works by John Dowland, Ástor Piazzolla, Erik Satie, Igor Stravinsky, and other composers. Carrere's nomination resulted in People magazine including her on their list of "Strange Grammy Nominees" for her past associations with the Wayne's World films and television show Dancing with the Stars. Hawaiian Blossom, Helm's third studio album, included guest artists Robert Cazimero and Led Kaapana. Greenberg again complimented Helm's falsetto vocals and recommended the album for fans of traditional Hawaiian music with a "contemporary twist". Awards were presented to Ho, Kahumoku, Konwiser and Wong; Daniel Ho also received an award as the engineer of the compilation album, which reached number twelve on Billboard's Top World Music Albums chart. This marked the third consecutive win for the production team's live recording of Maui's long-running "Masters of Hawaiian Slack Key Guitar" concert series. 2008 was also the first year in which the presentation of the award for Hawaiian Music Album was broadcast live on the Academy's official website.

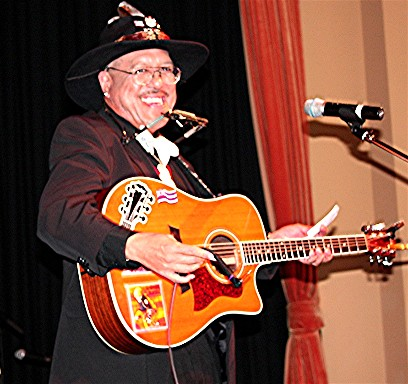
2009 nominee Dennis Kamakahi in 2010

2009 nominees included: Tia Carrere and Daniel Ho for Ikena, Amy Hanaiali'i for Aumakua, Led Kaapana and Mike Kaawa for Force of Nature, producers Chris and Milton Lau for Hawaiian Slack Key Kings Masters Series: Volume II, and Ho, Kahumoku, Dennis Kamakahi, Konwiser and Wong for the compilation album The Spirit of Hawaiian Slack Key Guitar. This year marked the first time in the category's history that all nominees were previous Best Hawaiian Music Album nominees—Hanaiali'i and Kaapana both received nominations in 2004 and 2006, Carrere was nominated in 2008, and Chris and Milton Lau were also nominated in 2006. Awards were presented to Carrere and Ho as performing artists, Amy Ku'uleialoha Stillman as a producer, and Ho as both a producer and engineer. Carrere and Ho became the first nominees to win awards as recording artists following four consecutive years of producers and engineers receiving awards for compilation albums.

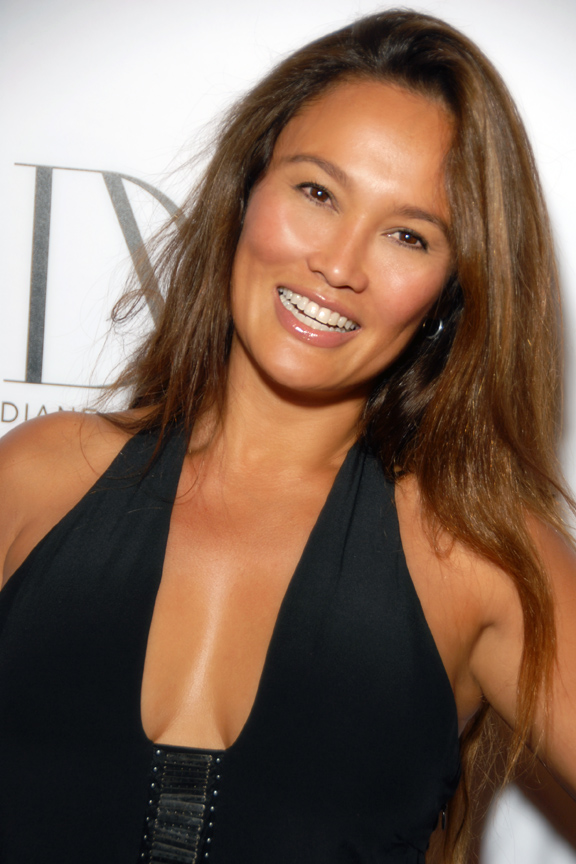
Two-time award winner Tia Carrere in 2009

For the 52nd Grammy Awards (2010), nominees included: Tia Carrere and Daniel Ho for He Nani, Amy Hanaiali'i for Friends & Family of Hawai'i, Hoʻokena for Nani Mau Loa: Everlasting Beauty, and producers Ho, Kahumoku, Konwiser and Wong for Masters of Hawaiian Slack Key Guitar: Volume 2. A tied vote for the fifth nominee resulted in only four nominated works. Family & Friends of Hawai'i contained vocal pop duets set to Matt Catingub's orchestral arrangements and reached a peak position of number three on Billboard's Top World Albums chart. The album featured guests Kamakahi, Willie Nelson, and Keali'i Reichel, among others. The second volume of Masters of Hawaiian Slack Key Guitar contained performances by falsetto vocalist Richard Ho'opi'i, steel guitarist Bobby Ingano, and slack-key players Kawika Kahiapo, Kamakahi, Sonny Lim, and co-producer Kahumoku. Hanaiali'i and her brother Eric Gilliom performed during the awards ceremony, providing a "mock opera lead-in" for Jamie Foxx on the song "Blame It". In addition to Ho, Kahumoku, Konwiser and Wong, awards were given to Peter deAquino, Ho and Sterling Seaton as the engineers/mixers. Guitarist Jeff Peterson joined the award winners on stage during the presentation. The win marked the fifth for a compilation album and the fourth to be co-produced by Ho. Konwiser and Wong became four-time award recipients, while Kahumoku (who was not credited as a producer of the 2006 award-winning compilation album) became a three-time recipient.

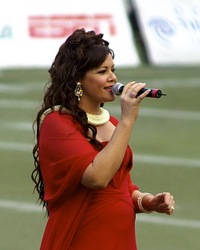
Five-time nominee Amy Hānaialiʻi Gilliom

Nominees for the 53rd Grammy Awards included: Tia Carrere for Huana Ke Aloha, Amy Hanaiali'i and Slack Key Masters of Hawaii for Amy Hanaiali'i and Slack Key Masters of Hawaii, Daniel Ho for Polani, Ledward Kaapana for The Legend, and Jeff Peterson for Maui on My Mind: Hawaiian Slack Key Guitar. Neither of Ho's nominated compilation albums featured the slack-key guitar. In addition to Carrere, awards were presented to Amy Ku'uleialoha Stillman as a producer and Daniel Ho as a producer and engineer/mixer. Related to the controversy surrounding Ho's multiple wins and supposed connections to the music industry, New York magazine called Carrere's win the "Best Grammy That'll Piss People Off". Carrere reportedly gave much of the credit to Ho, her long-time friend and producer. Huana Ke Aloha became the sixth consecutive Grammy-winning album released through the record label Daniel Ho Creations, causing some musicians and journalists to question whether or not the "playing field" was level. Carrere, Ho and Stillman claimed to have faced "serious consequences for the reception of [their] work and success" by being nominated, since all three lived and worked outside of Hawaii. Ho had been specifically targeted for residing in Los Angeles and participating in various Grammy-related events throughout the year, providing an unfair advantage. Voting members of the Academy had also been criticized for not being qualified to judge Hawaiian music.

=== List of recipients and nominees ===
| Year | Album | Artist(s) | Producer(s) |
|---|---|---|---|
47th
| 47th | Slack Key Guitar Volume 2 | Various Artists | Charles M. Brotman |
| 47th | Amy & Willie Live | Amy Hānaialiʻi Gilliom and Willie K | Willie K |
| 47th | Cool Elevation | Hoʻokena | |
| 47th | Ke'alaokamaile | Keali'i Reichel | |
| 47th | Some Call it Aloha... Don't Tell | The Brothers Cazimero | |
48th
| 48th | Masters of Hawaiian Slack Key Guitar - Vol. 1 | Various Artists | Daniel Ho, Paul Konwiser, and Wayne Wong |
| 48th | Kiho'alu: Hawaiian Slack Key Guitar | Ledward Kaapana | |
| 48th | Slack Key Dream of the Ponomoe | Kapono Beamer | |
| 48th | Slack Key Guitar: The Artistry of Sonny Lim | Sonny Lim | Sonny Lim |
| 48th | Sweet & Lovely | Raiatea Helm | |
49th
| 49th | Legends of Hawaiian Slack Key Guitar - Live from Maui | Various Artists | Daniel Ho, George Kahumoku Jr., Paul Konwiser, and Wayne Wong |
| 49th | Generation Hawai'i | Amy Hānaialiʻi Gilliom | |
| 49th | Grandmaster Slack Key Guitar | Ledward Kaapana | |
| 49th | Hawaiian Slack Key Strings | Various Artists | Chris Lau and Milton Lau |
| 49th | The Wild Hawaiian | Henry Kapono | |
50th
| 50th | Treasures of Hawaiian Slack Key Guitar | Various Artists | Peter Deaquino, Daniel Ho, George Kahumoku Jr. and Sterling Seaton |
| 50th | Hawaiian Blossom | Raiatea Helm | |
| 50th | Hawaiiana | Tia Carrere | |
| 50th | He'eai | Cyril Pahinui | |
| 50th | Ka Hikina O Ka Hau | Keola Beamer | |
51st
| 51st | Ikena | Tia Carrere and Daniel Ho | Daniel Ho and Amy Ku'uleialoha Stillman |
| 51st | Aumakua | Amy Hānaialiʻi Gilliom | |
| 51st | Forces of Nature | Mike Kaawa | |
| 51st | Hawaiian Slack Key Kings Masters Series: Volume II | Various Artists | Chris Lau and Milton Lau |
| 51st | The Spirit of Hawaiian Slack Key Guitar | Various Artists | |
52nd
| 52nd | Masters of Hawaiian Slack Key Guitar Volume 2 | Various Artists | George Kahumoku Jr., Peter Deaquino |
| 52nd | Friends & Family of Hawai'i | Amy Hānaialiʻi Gilliom | |
| 52nd | He Nani | Tia Carrere and Daniel Ho | |
| 52nd | Nani Mau Loa: Everlasting Beauty | Hoʻokena | |
53rd
| 53rd | Hauna Ke Aloha | Tia Carrere | Daniel Ho and Amy Ku'uleialoha Stillman |
| 53rd | Amy Hānaialiʻi Gilliom and Slack Key Masters of Hawaii | Various Artists | |
| 53rd | The Legend | Ledward Kaapana | |
| 53rd | Maui on my Mind: Hawaiian Slack Key Guitar | Jeff Peterson | |
| 53rd | Polani | Daniel Ho | Daniel Ho |

== Category retirement ==
In 2011, the category Best Hawaiian Music Album, along with thirty others, was eliminated due to a major category overhaul by the Recording Academy. Four additional categories in the American Roots Music field were eliminated (Best Contemporary Folk Album, Best Native American Music Album, Best Traditional Folk Album, Best Zydeco or Cajun Music Album). These were all replaced by one American Roots Music award, the Grammy for Best Regional Roots Music Album.

Daniel Ho was disappointed by the category's retirement, but considered the seven years the award was presented a "gift from the Recording Academy". Ho hoped that the category's elimination would eliminate the "craziness" surrounding the Hawaiian music controversy (he and Carrere were accused of lacking appreciation for Hawaiian music and for having inside connections to the music industry by residing in Los Angeles). Four-time award winner George Kahumoku, Jr. expressed similar disappointment, but was partly consoled by the fact that Hawaiian music recordings would still be included in the Regional Roots Music Album category. The record label Mountain Apple Company issued a statement claiming: "Hawaiian music deserves to be acknowledged as a category in its own right, not only for reasons of language but for cultural and historical reasons as well... The loss of the Grammy for Best Hawaiian Music Album is not only a major loss to the Hawaiian, but to music lovers across the globe". Michael Cord of HanaOla Records was also saddened by the elimination, but considered it "a long time coming". Hawaiian music works will now be eligible for the Best Regional Roots Music Album category.

Kalani Pe'a is the only Hawaiian Music artist to win in the new catch all category. Pe'a took home his first Grammy Award in 2017 and his second award in 2019. Pe'a also presented at the 61st Annual Grammy Awards Premiere Ceremony.

== See also ==
- Hawaiian Renaissance
- Na Hoku Hanohano Awards
