= List of Oricon number-one albums of 2004 =

These are the Oricon number one albums of 2004, per the Oricon Albums Chart.

== Chart history ==
Key
†	Indicates best-selling album of 2004

Issue Date	Album	Sales	Artist(s)
January 12	Wish You the Best	450,127	Mai Kuraki
January 19	Wish You the Best	180,186	Mai Kuraki
January 26	Love & Honesty	296,781	BoA
February 2	Love & Honesty	145,325	BoA
February 9	Jewels	160,278	Queen
February 16	Jewels	192,034	Queen
February 23	Jewels	165,126	Queen
March 1	One X One	325,651	Chemistry
March 8	One X One	140,527	Chemistry
March 15	Shining Energy	117,973	Joshi Juuni Gakubou
March 22	Commonplace	167,248	Every Little Thing
March 29	Iro Iro Goromo	124,621	Spitz
April 5	Blue: A Tribute to Yutaka Ozaki	191,567	Various Artists
April 12	Utada Hikaru Single Collection Vol. 1 †	1,403,102	Hikaru Utada
April 19	Shifuku no Oto	803,422	Mr. Children
April 26	Utada Hikaru Single Collection Vol. 1 †	188,428	Hikaru Utada
May 3	Utada Hikaru Single Collection Vol. 1 †	115,017	Hikaru Utada
May 10	Utada Hikaru Single Collection Vol. 1 †	110,126	Hikaru Utada
May 17	Utada Hikaru Single Collection Vol. 1 †	73,385	Hikaru Utada
May 24	Under My Skin	286,894	Avril Lavigne
May 31	Under My Skin	122,461	Avril Lavigne
June 7	Aratanaru Kōshinryō o Motomete	137,131	Naotaro Moriyama
June 14	Aratanaru Kōshinryō o Motomete	86,274	Naotaro Moriyama
June 21	Aratanaru Kōshinryō o Motomete	57,251	Naotaro Moriyama
June 28	Misia Love & Ballads: The Best Ballade Collection	54,107	Misia
July 5	TMG I	90,281	TMG
July 12	Do You Know?	141,377	Nobodyknows+
July 19	Do You Know?	68,146	Nobodyknows+
July 26	Trunk	232,519	HY
August 2	Iza, Now!	115,241	Arashi
August 9	Porno Graffitti Best Blue's	400,318	Porno Graffitti
August 16	Porno Graffitti Best Blue's	145,217	Porno Graffitti
August 23	Explorer	157,648	Noriyuki Makihara
August 30	[sí:]	161,058	Tsuyoshi Domoto
September 6	Yggdrasil	315,065	Bump of Chicken
September 13	TOK10	97,156	Tokio
September 20	Exodus	523,761	Utada
September 27	1: One	217,648	Yuzu
October 4	Peace of Mind	220,127	Koshi Inaba
October 11	Heart of Gold: Street Future Opera Beat Pops	247,852	Exile
October 18	Heart of Gold: Street Future Opera Beat Pops	86,251	Exile
October 25	Fullmetal Alchemist: Complete Best	108,612	Various Artists
November 1	Sol-fa	300,468	Asian Kung-Fu Generation
November 8	Sol-fa	99,407	Asian Kung-Fu Generation
November 15	Greatest Hits: My Prerogative	173,145	Britney Spears
November 22	Arashi 5x5: The Best Selection of 2002–2004	126,532	Arashi
November 29	Love Jam	224,381	Ai Otsuka
December 6	Sentimentalovers	687,516	Ken Hirai
December 13	MusiQ	872,716	Orange Range
December 20	MusiQ	401,231	Orange Range
December 27	My Story	574,321	Ayumi Hamasaki

== Annual ==
- Number-one album of 2004: Utada Hikaru Single Collection Vol. 1 by Hikaru Utada.
- Most weeks at number-one: Hikaru Utada with a total of 5 weeks (6 weeks if included their English album Exodus release under their alias Utada).

== See also ==
- 2004 in music
