= Leon Niihama =

Japanese enka singer

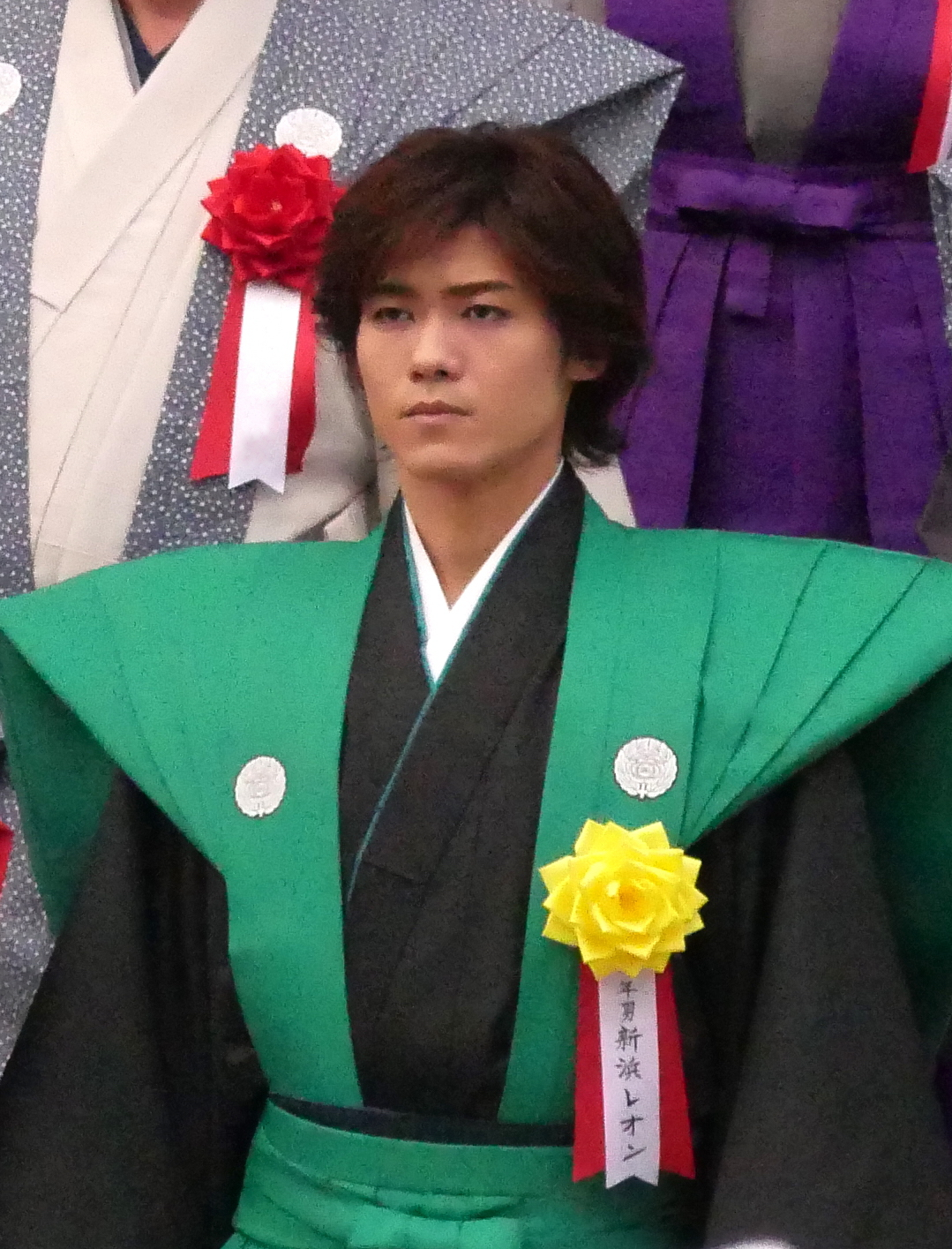
- Niihama in 2020

Background information
- Born: Yūki Takajō (高城 勇貴); May 11, 1996 (age 30); Shiroi, Chiba, Japan
- Genres: Enka, Kayōkyoku
- Years active: 2019–present
- Label: Kaikyo Record (2019–present)
- Website: niihamaleon.com

YouTube information
- Channel: 新浜レオン
- Years active: 2019–present
- Subscribers: 34.5 thousand
- Views: 21.4 million
- Last updated: 4 August 2026

Leon Niihama (新浜レオン, Niihama Reon), birth name Yūki Takajō (高城 勇貴), born May 11, 1996, in Shiroi, Chiba, Japan, is a Japanese enka and kayōkyoku singer, who debuted on the first day of Reiwa, May 1, 2019, and is currently signed to Kaikyo Record label, a subsidiary of B Zone. His alma mater is Daito Bunka University.

== Early life ==
Niihama devoted himself to baseball since elementary school, even becoming a catcher and captain when he was in high school. When he failed to reach his dream to appear in Koshien, he decided to follow his father's path, Yasuo Takajo (髙城靖雄, Takajō Yasuo), to become an enka singer. Even before that, he has already been interested in the enka music due to the father's influence, citing as the major influence Hideki Saijo and Itsuki Hiroshi. When he was in his third year at Daito Bunka University, he won the Grand Prix at the "Mr. Daito Contest 2017".

== Career ==
On May 1, 2019, on the first day of Reiwa, he made his major debut with the single "Hanasanai Hanasanai" as the first artist of B Zone Group's enka label Kaikyo Record. Four days after the debut, he become the main host of his own television show "Hajimemashite, Boku, Niihama Leon Desu!" broadcast on Chiba Television, which lasted until 2021. Later, at the same year, he won "61st Japan Record Awards" in the "New Artist Awards" category.

In 2020, he won Best Enka/Kayokyoku New Artist at the 34th Japan Gold Disc Awards. In 2022, his single "Tukamaete Konya" served as an opening theme to the anime television series Case Closed: The Culprit Hanzawa. In 2021, he designed his own original Sanrio character Leosuke (れおすけ).

In 2023, he made his acting debut in the television drama Gekoku Juukyuuji. Later the same year, he released his first video album Leon Niihama 5 Shuunen Kinen Concert, including footage from the live concert held on May 11.

In 2024, he collaborated with the guitarist Tak Matsumoto from the same music agency on the covers single "Kizudarake no Roller", which was included on the kayokyoku covers album The Hit Parade II.

== Discography ==
As of 2025, he has released 8 singles and 1 video album.

=== Singles ===
Title	Album details	Peak chart positions
Title	Album details	JPN Oricon
"Hanasanai Hanasanai" (離さない 離さない)	Released: May 1, 2019; Label: Kaikyo; Formats: CD, digital download, streaming	19
"Kimi wo Motomete" (君を求めて)	Released: July 1, 2020; Label: Kaikyo; Formats: CD, digital download, streaming	7
"Dame Dame..." (ダメ ダメ...)	Released: May 12, 2021; Label: Kaikyo; Formats: CD, digital download, streaming	12
"Jealousy: Unmei ni Kiss wo Shiyō" (ジェラシー〜運命にKissをしよう〜)	Released: September 28, 2022; Label: Kaikyo; Formats: CD, digital download, streaming	7
"Tsukamaete, Konya" (捕まえて、今夜。)	Released: May 3, 2023; Label: Kaikyo; Formats: CD, digital download, streaming	10
"Subete Ageyō" （全てあげよう）	Released: March 27, 2024; Label: Kaikyo; Formats: CD, digital download, streaming	5
"Fun!Fun!Fun!" / "Hono no Kiss" (Fun!Fun!Fun!/炎のkiss)	Released: April 16, 2025; Label: Kaikyo; Formats: CD, digital download, streaming	2
New Beginning ("Love Shinai?") (LOVE しない?)	Released: April 15, 2026; Label: Kaikyo; Formats: CD, digital download, streaming	4

=== Digital singles ===
Year	Single	Reference
2020	"Kimi wo Motomete" （君を求めて）	
2022	"Jealousy: Unmei ni Kiss wo Shiyou" （ジェラシー〜運命にKissをしよう〜）	
2022	"Konya, Tsukamaete" （捕まえて、今夜。）	

=== Video albums ===
Title	Album details
Niihama Leon 5 Shuunen Kinen Concert (新浜レオン5周年記念コンサート)	Released: November 21, 2023; Label: Kaikyo; Formats: Blu-ray

== Filmography ==
- Worst to First: A Teen Baseball Miracle (2023), Johnson
- Unbound (2025), Tomimoto Itsukidayu
