= Raiatea Helm =

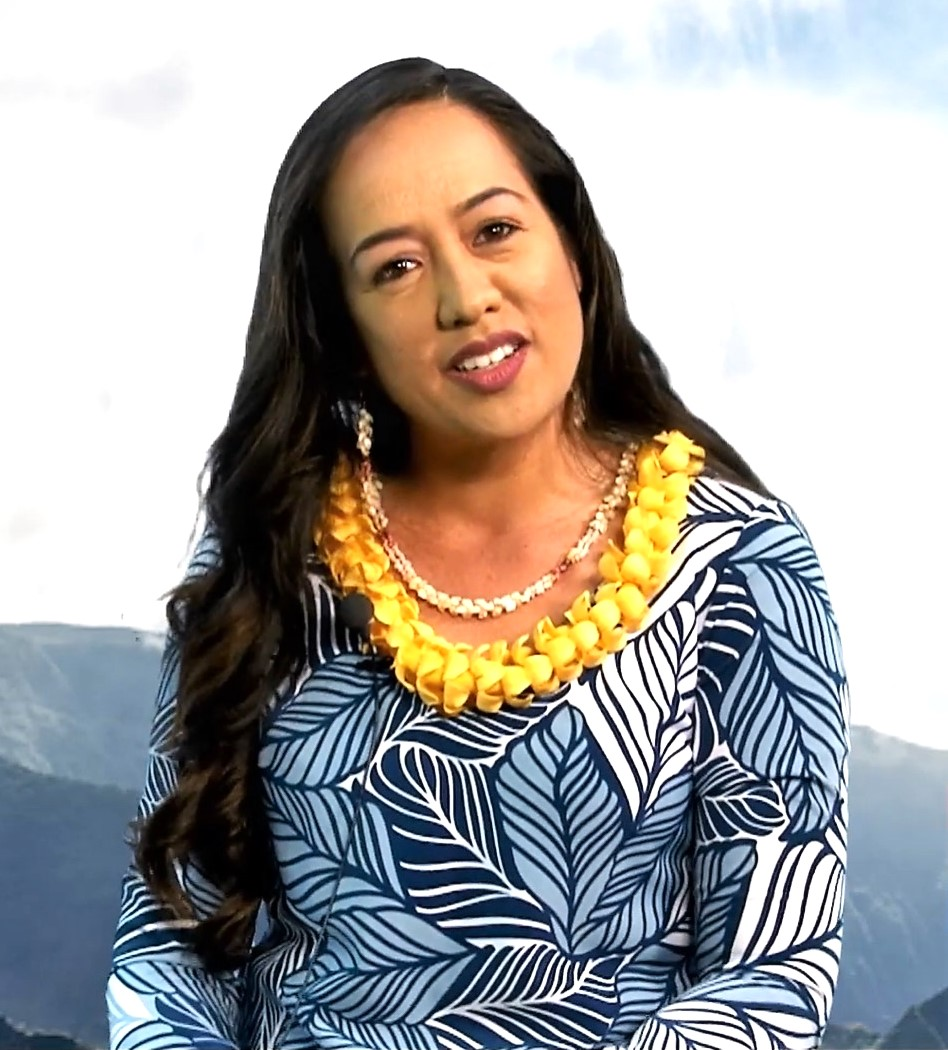
- Helm photographed in 2019

Background information
- Born: August 8, 1984 (age 42); O'ahu, Hawaii, U.S.
- Genre: Hawaiian
- Occupation: Vocalist
- Instruments: Vocals; ukulele
- Years active: 2000–present
- Labels: Mountain Apple; Raiatea Helm
- Website: raiateahelm.com

Raiatea Mokihana Maile Helm (born 8 August 1984) is a Hawaiian music vocalist from Molokaʻi, Hawaiʻi. She has earned four Na Hoku Hanohano awards, as well as two Grammy nominations for Best Hawaiian Music Album.

Helm is best known for her Leo Kiʻekiʻe (Hawaiian falsetto). Helm started her music career when she was 16. At 18 she released her first album, Far Away Heaven, which was critically acclaimed and won her the Na Hoku Hanohano Female Vocalist of the Year Award and the Most Promising Artist Award. Her second album, Sweet and Lovely, earned her four more Na Hoku Hanohano awards, as well as a Grammy nomination for Best Hawaiian Music Album at the 48th Grammy Awards, making Helm the first Hawaiian female vocalist nominated for a Grammy. Her third album, Hawaiian Blossom, earned her further Na Hoku Hanohano awards, as well as a second Grammy nomination. Her 2016 album, He Leo Huali, A Pure Voice, also won her a Na Hoku Hanohano Award.

Helm has recorded with a number of other Hawaiian music artists, such as Keola Beamer, Genoa Keawe, and Kealiʻi Reichel. She graduated from the University of Hawaiʻi at Mānoa, with a BA in Music.

Raiatea Helm is a descendant of King Kamehameha I, thru Chiefess Keanolani, daughter of Abigail Maheha and Lot Kapuāiwa, who reigned as King of Hawaii from 1863 to 1872. She is the daughter of Zachary Helm and Henrietta Helm, and the niece of Hawaiian musician and sovereignty activist, George Helm.

== Discography ==
Name	Format	Year	Notes
Far Away Heaven	Album	2002	Na Hoku Hanohano Female Vocalist of the Year, Most Promising Artist
Sweet and Lovely	Album	2004	Na Hoku Hanohano Female Vocalist of the Year / Favorite Entertainer of the Year. Grammy Nominee
Hawaiian Blossom	Album	2007	Na Hoku Hanohano award winner / Grammy Nominee.
Keola Beamer and Raiatea	Album	2010	
Sea of Love	Album	2011	
Ave Maria	Single	2013	
Raiatea Live!	DVD		
He Leo Huali, A Pure Voice	Album	2016	Na Hoku Hanohano Female Vocalist of the Year / Engineered Album: Hawaiian award winners
