= Take Your Pick (album) =

Studio album by Larry Carlton & Tak Matsumoto
- Released: June 2, 2010
- Studio: Larry's Log Cabin (Franklin, Tennessee) Eclectic Studio (Nashville, Tennessee) Rodeo Recording (Los Angeles, California) Birdman West (Tokyo, Japan) Gardenia Studio (Tokyo, Japan)
- Genre: Jazz fusion
- Length: 61:07
- Label: Vermillion (Japan); 335 Records (US); Forward (Taiwan)
- Producer: Larry Carlton; Tak Matsumoto

Larry Carlton chronology
Plays the Sound of Philadelphia (2010)	Take Your Pick (2010)	Four Hands and a Heart, Volume One (2012)

Tak Matsumoto chronology
Theatre of Strings (2005)	Take Your Pick (2010)	Strings of My Soul (2012)

Take Your Pick is an album by guitarists Larry Carlton and Tak Matsumoto that was released by Vermillion on June 2, 2010, in Japan, and later on 335 Records in the US and on Forward in Taiwan. The album debuted at number 2 on the Japanese Oricon weekly album charts. The album won an award for Best Pop Instrumental Album at the 53rd Grammy Awards. It also won the "Jazz Album of the Year" award at 25th Japan Gold Disc Awards.

== Track listing ==
All songs arranged by Larry Carlton, Tak Matsumoto & Hideyuki Terachi

No.	Title	Writer(s)	Length
1.	"Jazzy Bullets"	Tak Matsumoto	4:22
2.	"Nite Crawler 2010"	Larry Carlton	6:08
3.	"The Way We Were"	Matsumoto	4:57
4.	"Islands of Japan"	Carlton	4:38
5.	"Neon Blue"	Carlton	6:16
6.	"Tokyo Night"	Matsumoto	4:33
7.	"Hotalu"	Matsumoto	4:52
8.	"East West Stroll"	Carlton	5:30
9.	"Easy Mystery"	Carlton	5:11
10.	"Ao"	Matsumoto	4:08
11.	"Take Your Pick"	Carlton	4:49
12.	"A Girl from China"	Matsumoto	5:36
Total length:			61:07

== Musicians ==
- Larry Carlton – guitars, arrangements (2, 4, 5, 8–10)
- Tak Matsumoto – guitars, arrangements (1, 3, 6, 7, 11, 12)
- Jeff Babko – keyboards
- Michael Rhodes – bass
- Billy Kilson – drums
- Watanabe Fire – saxophones (1, 12)
- Kazuhiro Takeda – saxophones (1, 12)
- Mark Douthit – saxophones (2, 9, 10)
- Azusa Tojo – trombone (1, 12)
- Barry Green – trombone (2, 9, 10)
- Osamu Ueishi – trumpet (1, 12)
- Mike Haynes – trumpet (2, 9, 10)

=== Production ===
- Larry Carlton – producer
- Tak Matsumoto – producer
- Nick Sparks – recording
- Hiroyuki Kobayashi – recording, mixing
- Tetsuo Ueda – art direction, design
