= Maui Academy of Performing Arts =

Coordinates: 20.888541°N 156.503547°W

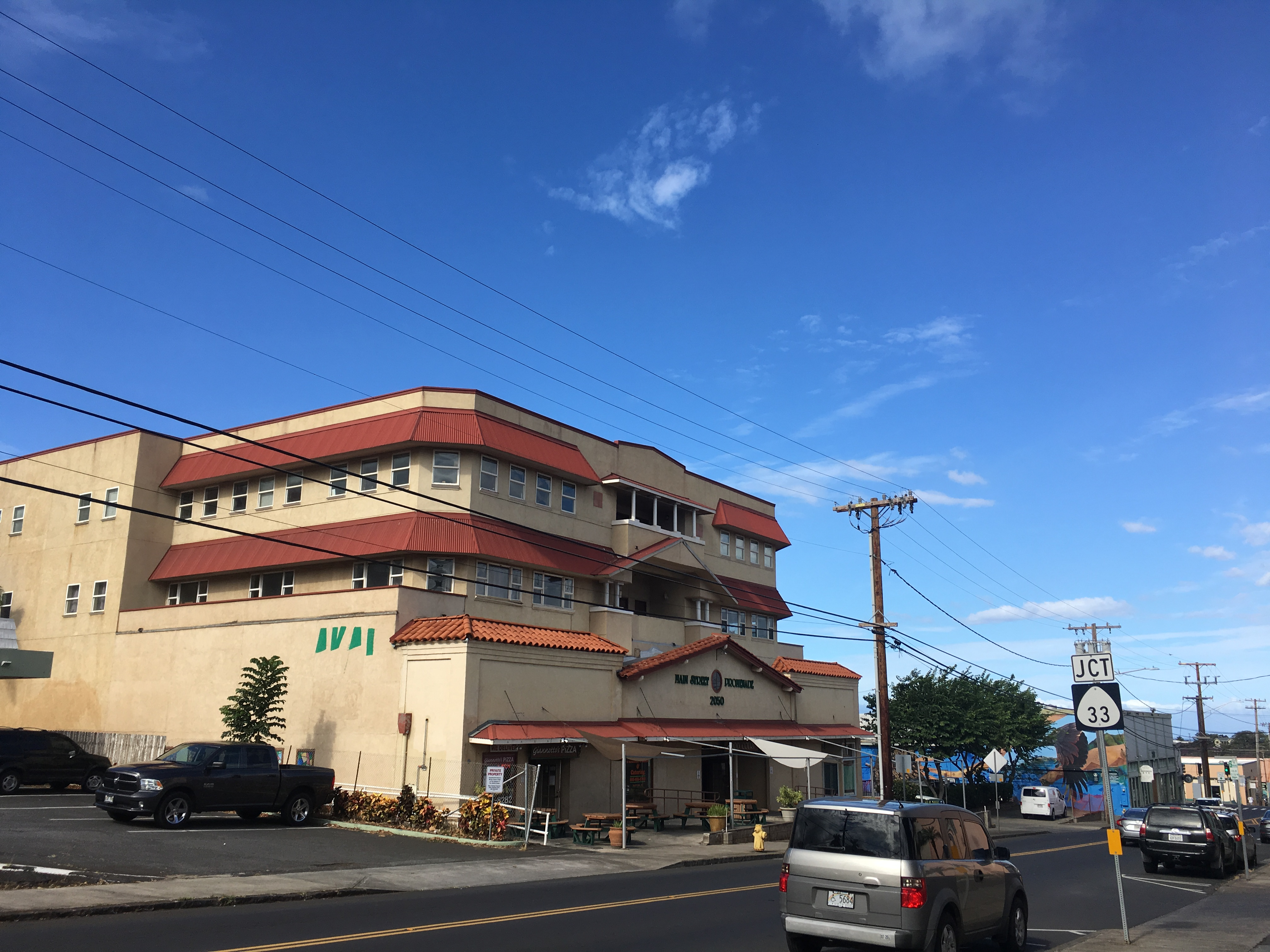
Location of Maui Academy of Performing Arts, September 2019

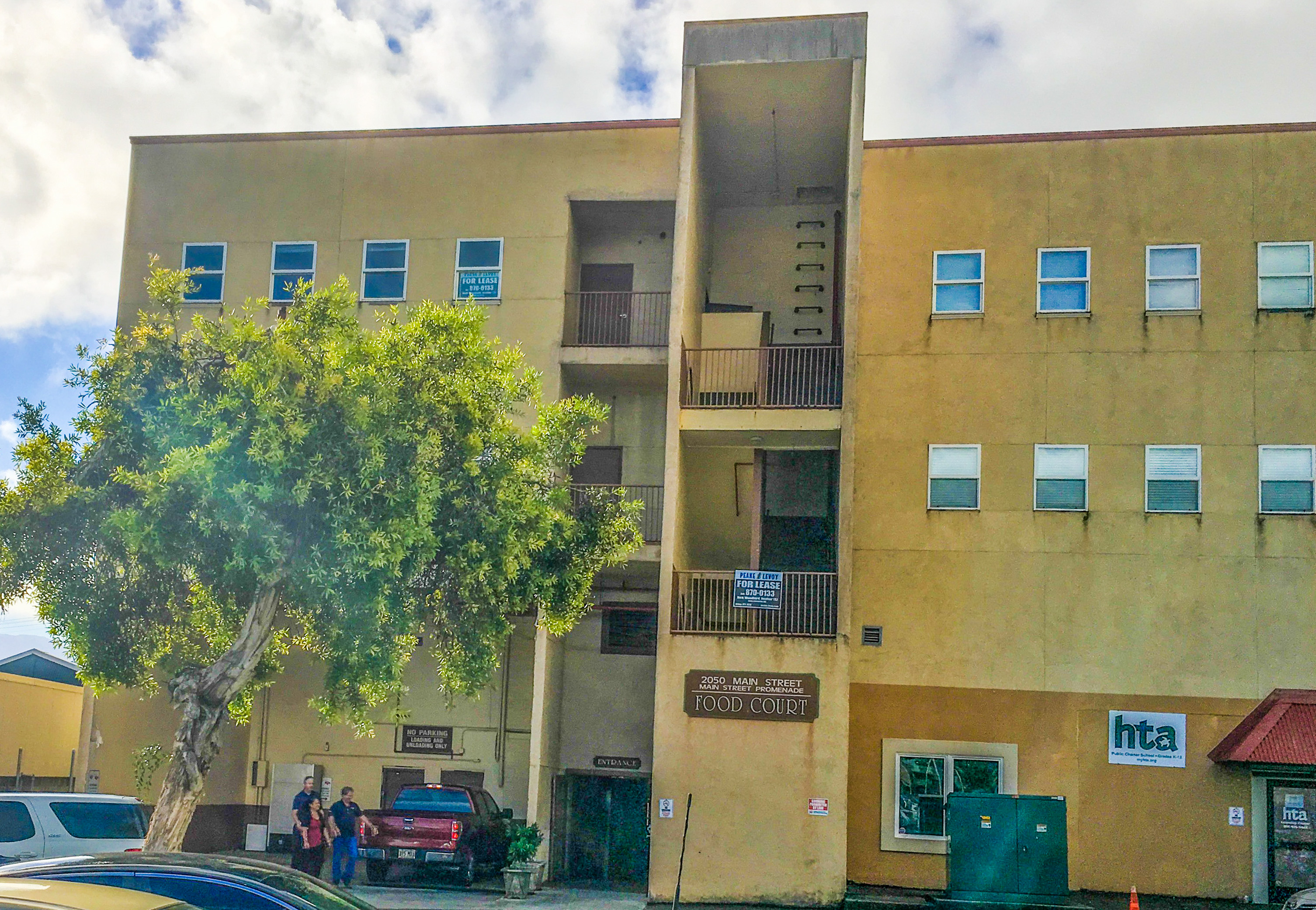
The back side of the building where the office of Maui Academy of Performing Arts is located, February 2019

The Maui Academy of Performing Arts (MAPA) is a nonprofit theatre company that produces community theater and offers classes to children and young adults. Over the years, the mainstay of the Academy has been their drama, dance, and summer programs.

MAPA was founded in 1974 as the Maui Youth Theater by Linda Takita (daughter of Frankie Yankovic). In 1998 it purchased a 13,000 sq ft (1,200 m^{2}). building in Wailuku as its main production location. During this time, the Academy has had over 500 productions. Some notable students and actors are Hawaiian music artists Kealiʻi Reichel, Amy Hānaialiʻi Gilliom, Eric Gilliom, screenwriter Gregory Poirier, and actor, screenwriter, director Brian Kohne.

Every year, the Academy performs for over 25,000 elementary and pre-school students in roughly 200 schools across the state of Hawaii. Its Voices Drama Education Program teaches literacy skills through drama to over 5000 students in Maui County.

The Academy has a yearly summer musical production and a spring dance concert. The dance program has attracted guest choreographers from as far away as New York and Los Angeles.

== Donations and grants ==
As a non-profit organization, the Maui Academy of Performing Arts has received donations and grants from federal, state, and private sources, including the National Endowment for the Arts, the Hawaii Community Foundation, the Samuel N and Mary Castle Foundation, the Alexander & Baldwin Foundation, the McInemy Foundation, the Hawaii Children's Trust Fund, and the Children's Justice Center
