= TMG I =

Studio album by Tak Matsumoto Group
- Released: June 23, 2004
- Genre: Hard rock
- Length: 58:10
- Label: Vermillion (Japan); Frontiers (Europe)
- Producer: Tak Matsumoto

Tak Matsumoto Group chronology
TMG I (2004)	TMG II (2024)

Singles from TMG I
- 1. "Oh Japan ~Our Time Is Now~" Released: March 31, 2004

TMG I is the first studio album by the Japan-based supergroup Tak Matsumoto Group, released on June 23, 2004. Eric Martin and Jack Blades, of Mr. Big and Night Ranger fame respectively, wrote all of the lyrics, while Tak Matsumoto, the founder of the band and of B’z fame, was responsible for all of the music. The album topped the Oricon Albums Chart, selling over 90,000 copies, while the single "Oh Japan ~Our Time Is Now~" reached number 3 on the Oricon Singles Chart with 98,346 copies and was the 95th best-selling single of the year.

== Track listing ==
All music is composed by Tak Matsumoto.

No.	Title	Lyrics	Length
1.	"Oh Japan ~Our Time Is Now~"	Eric Martin, Jack Blades	4:09
2.	"Everything Passes Away"	Blades	4:40
3.	"Kings for a Day"	Martin, Tony Fanucchi, Andre Pessis	3:37
4.	"I Know You by Heart"	Martin, Blades	3:33
5.	"I Wish You were Here"	Blades, Martin	4:19
6.	"The Greatest Show on Earth"	Martin, Andre Pessis	3:03
7.	"Signs of Life"	Blades	3:50
8.	"Red, White and Bullet Blues"	Martin, Pessis	4:53
9.	"Trapped"	Martin, Blades	3:38
10.	"My Alibi"	Blades	3:08
11.	"Wonderland"	Martin, Pessis	4:16
12.	"Train, Train"	Martin, Pessis	4:18
13.	"Two of a Kind"	Blades	5:42
14.	"Never Good-Bye"	Blades	5:02
Total length:			58:10

== Personnel ==
Tak Matsumoto Group

- Tak Matsumoto – guitars, rap on "Oh Japan ~Our Time Is Now~"
- Eric Martin – lead vocals
- Jack Blades – bass, background vocals, co-lead vocals on "Everything Passes Away"

Additional musicians

- Brian Tichy – drums on tracks 1–9, 11 & 14
- Cindy Blackman – drums on tracks 10, 12 & 13
- Akira Onozuka – organ on "Two of a Kind"
- Shinichiro Ohta – background vocals on "Trapped"
- Aimee Joy Misaki – voice on "Everything Passes Away"

== Charts ==
Chart (2004)	Peak position
Japanese Albums (Oricon)	1

== Certifications ==
Region	Certification	Certified units/sales
Japan (RIAJ)	Gold	100,000^{^}
^{^} Shipments figures based on certification alone.

== See also ==
- List of Oricon number-one albums of 2004
