= Amy Hānaialiʻi Gilliom =

American vocalist and songwriter

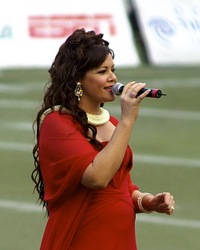
- Amy Hānaialiʻi Gilliom at the 2007 Hawaii Bowl
- Born: Amy Hānaialiʻi Gilliom; Maui, Hawaii, US
- Occupations: Singer; songwriter; musician; entertainer
- Years active: 1993-present
- Relatives: Eric Gilliom
- Awards: Na Hoku Hanohano Award
- Musical career
- Genre: Hawaiian music
- Website: amyhawaii.com

Amy Hānaialiʻi Gilliom is an American vocalist and songwriter. She has been nominated for the Grammy Award for Best Hawaiian Music Album six times.

She is best known for reinvigorating the Hawaiian tradition of female falsetto singing.

== Early years ==
When growing up, Gilliom, her father (Lloyd), her mother (Mimi) and her brother were all involved with the Maui Youth Theater, now known as the Maui Academy of Performing Arts.

Her first album, Native Child (Mountain Apple Company MACD 2030), was released in 1995. "Hawaiian Tradition" (MACD 2040), her second album, was recorded and released in 1997.

Gilliom carries the legacy of her grandmother Jennie Napua Woodd. In the 1930s, her grandmother performed in New York City's famed Lexington Hotel, which was home of the original "Hawaiian Room". The Hawaiian Room ran for 60 years and sold out seven nights a week. Gilliom's grandmother performed at the Hawaiian Room for many years. Her brother Eric Gilliom is also a performer and she has performed with him professionally.

== Career ==
Gillioms' album Generation Hawaii won four Nā Hōkū Hanohano (Stars of Distinction) Awards in 2007 for Album of the Year, Hawaiian Album of the Year, Female Vocalist of the Year and Best Engineered Album. These Awards are the Hawaii recording industry's regional equivalent of the Grammy Awards.

Gilliom was also one of five finalists for the 2006 Grammy Awards for Best Hawaiian Music Album but did not win. She performed, recorded, and toured for several years with fellow Hawaiian music artist Willie K, the producer of her first hit album, "Hawaiian Tradition". The two also had a personal relationship, which ended in 2001.

In 2013, Gilliom joined Willie K to sing "Imagine" by John Lennon at the signing of the Hawaii Marriage Equality Act by Governor Neil Abercrombie. This made Hawaii the 15th state in the U.S. to legalize same-sex marriage. In 2014, Gilliom announced a forthcoming recording "Reunion" with Willie K. She was selected to serve on the Board of Directors for the Native Arts and Cultures Foundation and in October Governor Abercrombie proclaimed October 15 to be 'Amy Hanaialiʻi and Willie K. Day' in Hawaii.

In 2014 Gilliom launched her own line of wine and champagne with distribution throughout the USA.

In 2014, Gilliom starred as Eva Perón in the musical Evita on Maui.

Gilliom is a six-time Grammy Award nominee.
