= George Kahumoku Jr. =

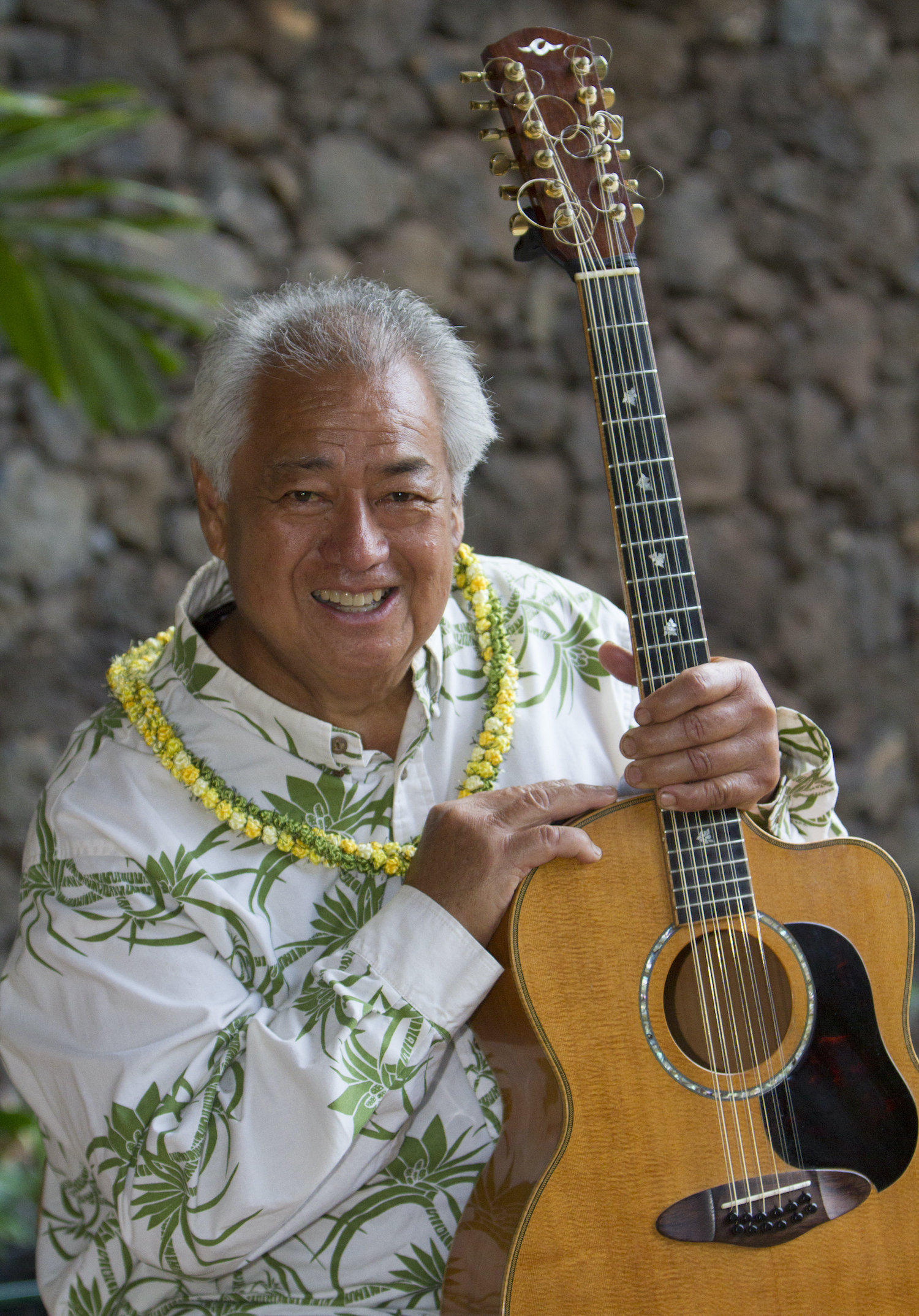
George Kahumoku Jr. with 12-string guitar.

George Kahumoku Jr. is a Grammy Award-winning Hawaiian musician specializing in slack-key guitar. He was born in Kona on Hawaiʻi, He was labeled as "Hawaii's Renaissance Man" by Nona Beamer, for his musical and cultural contributions. He received the 2007 Grammy Award for Best Hawaiian Music Album for the compilation album Legends Of Hawaiian Slack Key Guitar – Live From Maui and subsequently 2 more for Treasures of Hawaiian Slack Key Guitar and Masters of Hawaiian Slack Key Guitar, vol.2.

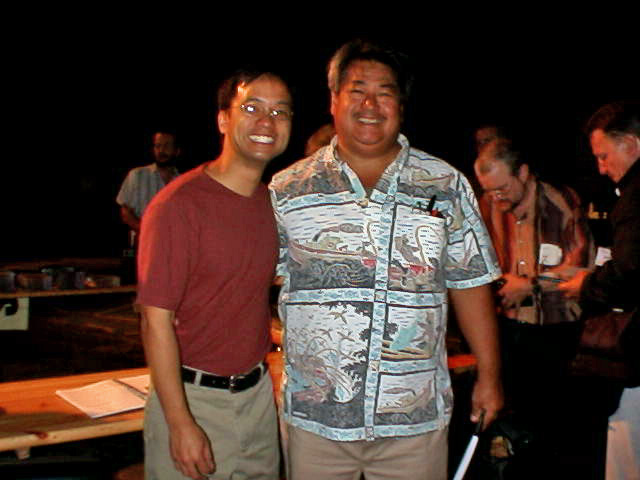
George Kahumoku Jr. (right) and Daniel Ho at the Slack Key Guitar Festival at Expo 2000 in Hannover, Germany
