= The Hit Parade II =

Studio album by Tak Matsumoto
- Released: August 28, 2024
- Recorded: 2024
- Genre: Kayōkyoku
- Label: Vermillion
- Producer: Tak Matsumoto

Tak Matsumoto chronology
Bluesman (2020)	The Hit Parade II (2024)

Singles from The Hit Parade
- 1. "Blue Light Yokohama" Released: June 15, 2024; 2. "Kizudarake no Roll" Released: July 13, 2024; 3. "Roppongi Shinjuu" Released: July 25, 2024

The Hit Parade II is a covers album by Tak Matsumoto in conjunction with several guest artists. It was released on August 28, 2024, through Vermillion Records, more than 20 years after The Hit Parade.

== Background ==
In May 2024, the album announcement was made during his live tour Here Comes the Bluesman, with the official statement written few days later.

The album features cover songs from the late Showa Period from artists such as Off Course, Hideki Saijo and Ann Lewis.

The album has been performed by young artists from Giza Studio such as Aoi Garnet, Z, Daishi Uehara from Wands, Leon Niihama and well-known by public artist such as Teru from Glay and LiSA. Koshi Inaba and Mai Kuraki were the only ones, who reprised their previous roles in the album.

The album was released in three formats: the regular edition, first-press edition and special limited edition. The special edition includes a Blu-ray Disc with partial live footage of the concert "Here Comes the Bluesman" with the guest vocals of Kuraki and Niihama.

== Promotion ==
=== Singles ===
The first promotional cover single was "Blue Light Yokohama", originally performed by Ayumi Ishida and covered by Mai Kuraki. The single was released on June 15, 2024. One week before, Matsumoto performed together with Kuraki on the music television program Music Fair.

The second promotional single was "Kizudarake no Roller", originally performed by Hideki Saijo and covered by Leon Niihama. The single was released on July 13. The third promotional cover single was "Roppongi Shinju", originally performed by Ann Lewis, covered by LiSA. The single was released on July 25. All of the singles received a digital-only release.

== Track listing ==
The Hit Parade II track listing
No.	Title	Original performer	Length
1.	"Hikigane (銃爪)" (by Koshi Inaba)	Masanori Sera	3:31
2.	"Rakuyo (落陽)" (by Teru (Glay))	Takuro Yoshida	3:34
3.	"Blue Light Yokohama (ブルーライト・ヨコハマ)" (by Mai Kuraki)	Ayumi Ishida	3:01
4.	"Mokuren no Namida (木蘭の涙)" (GRe4N BOYZ)	Stardust Revue	5:00
5.	"Roppongi Shinjū (六本木心中)" (by LiSA)	Ann Lewis	5:01
6.	"Toki no Sugiyuku Mama ni (時の過ぎゆくままに)" (by Daishi Uehara (Wands))	Kenji Sawada	3:24
7.	"Kizudarake no Roller (傷だらけのローラ)" (by Leon Niihama)	Hideki Saijo	3:19
8.	"Yes-No" (by Aoi Garnet)	Off Course	5:07
9.	"Shiroi Fuyu (白い冬)" (by Z)	Fukinotō	3:29
10.	"Oretachi no Kunshō Theme (俺たちの勲章テーマ)" (by Tak Matsumoto)	Tranzam	3:52

== Charts ==
Chart performance for The Hit Parade II
Chart (2024)	Peak position
Japanese Albums (Oricon)	7
Japanese Digital Albums (Oricon)	7
Japanese Hot Albums (Billboard Japan)	6

== Release history ==
Release history and formats for The Hit Parade II
Region	Date	Version	Format	Label	Catalog No.	Ref.
Japan	August 28, 2024	Standard edition	CD	Vermillion	BMCS-8016	
Japan	August 28, 2024	First-press edition (limited)	CD+BD	Vermillion	VBMCS-8015	
Japan	August 28, 2024	Limited edition	CD+BD+poster	Vermillion	BMCS-8014	
Various	August 28, 2024	Digital download		Vermillion		
