= Willie K =

Hawaiian musician (1960–2020)

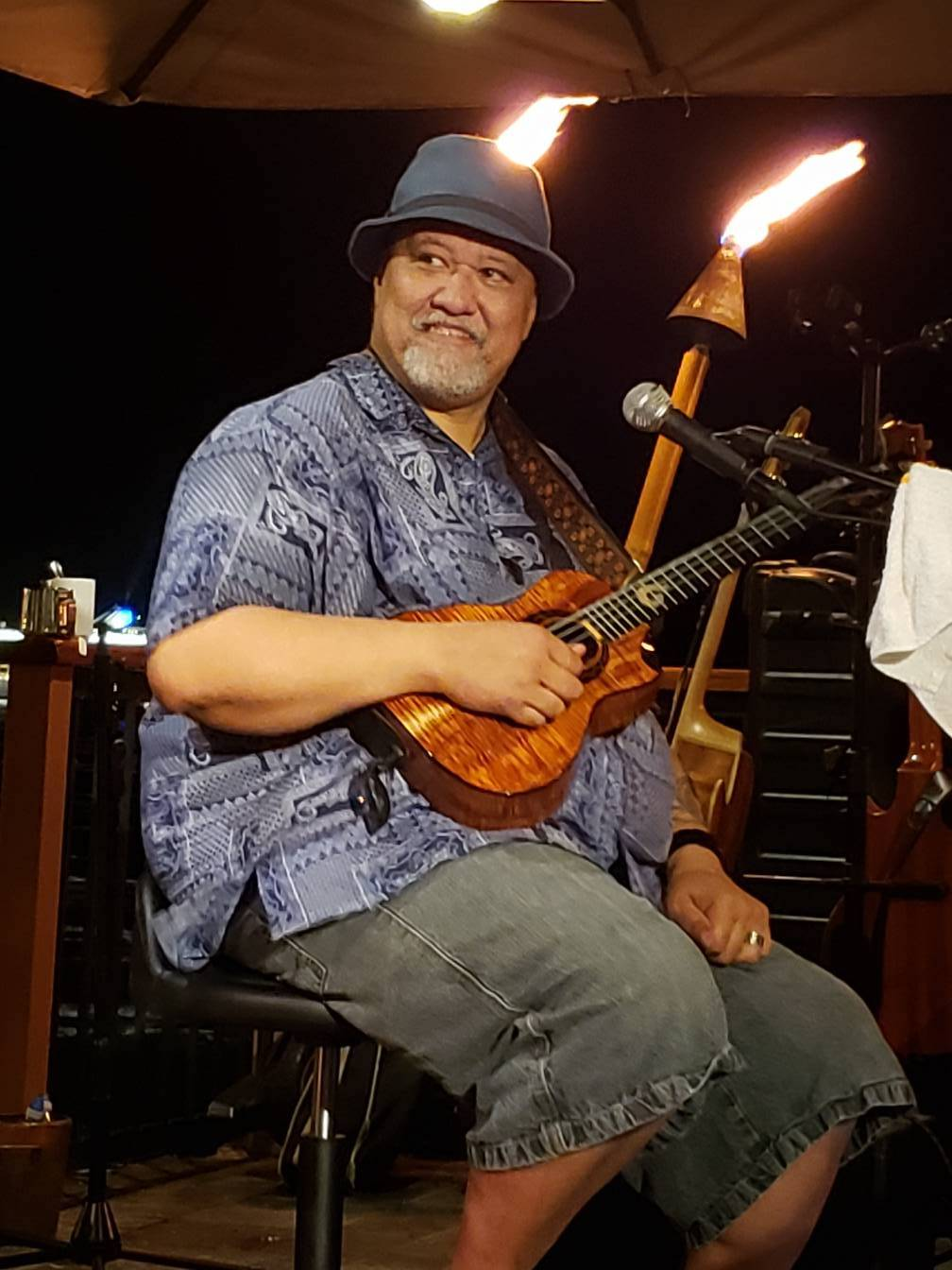
- Willie K performing on Maui
- Born: William Awihilima Kahaiali'i; October 17, 1960; Lahaina, Maui, Hawaii, US
- Died: May 18, 2020 (aged 59); Wailuku, Maui, Hawaii, US
- Occupations: Singer; songwriter; musician; entertainer
- Years active: 1970–2018
- Awards: Na Hoku Hanohano Award
- Musical career
- Genres: Hawaiian music; blues; rock; opera; cachi cachi
- Instruments: Vocals; guitar; ukulele
- Website: williek.com

William Awihilima Kahaialiʻi (October 17, 1960 – May 18, 2020), known as Willie K, was a Hawaiian musician who performed in a variety of styles, including blues, rock, opera and Hawaiian music.

== Early life ==
Born and raised in a family of musicians in Lahaina, Hawaii, Willie began performing at the age of 8 alongside his father, Hawaiian jazz guitarist Manu Kahaialiʻi.

== Career ==
In 1993, Willie began a collaboration with Amy Hānaialiʻi Gilliom that would last for nine years. The pair recorded, performed, and toured together, and also shared a personal relationship. Their recordings won seven Na Hoku Hanohano Awards, part of Willie's total of 19 Hokus as a musician and producer.

In 2005, Willie's reunion album with Gilliom, Amy & Willie Live, was nominated for a Grammy in the first year of the Best Hawaiian Music Album award.

In 2007, Willie K became one of very few artists to win a Hoku as part of three different acts – his collaboration with Eric Gilliom called "Barefoot Natives" won Best Contemporary Hawaiian Album, in addition to wins already achieved with Amy and as a solo artist.

== Genres ==
Willie K played many different genres of music including Hawaiian music, blues, rock, opera, and Cachi Cachi music.

== Cancer and death ==
In February 2018, Willie K was diagnosed with lung cancer and promptly canceled upcoming performances in Honolulu. In April 2019, Willie announced via his Facebook page that he was undergoing immunotherapy.

In January 2020, in a video posted to Facebook, Willie announced that his cancer was at the terminal stage. He made the video after a concert at Blue Note Hawaii in Waikiki. He stated that his "spirits remained high during the concert," which was supposed to be only a 90-minute set, but lasted for two hours. "The crowd deserved it," he said.

Willie K died at age 59 on May 18, 2020.
