= Masters of Hawaiian Slack Key Guitar =

Compilation album by Various Artists
- Released: 2010
- Genre: Slack-key guitar

Masters of Hawaiian Slack Key Guitar is an album released in 2010. It won a Grammy Award for Best Hawaiian Music Album. It reached number fifteen on the Billboard Top World Music Albums chart.

It featured Owana Salazar.
