= Oh Japan (Our Time Is Now) =

Single by Tak Matsumoto Group

from the album TMG I
- B-side: "Trapped"
- Released: March 31, 2004
- Genre: Hard rock
- Length: 15:40
- Label: Vermillion
- Composer: Tak Matsumoto
- Lyricists: Eric Martin, Jack Blades
- Producer: Tak Matsumoto

"Oh Japan (Our Time Is Now)" (stylized as "Oh Japan ~Our Time Is Now~") is the only single by Japan-based supergroup Tak Matsumoto Group, released on March 31, 2004. It was used as the theme song for TV Asahi Network Sports 2004.

The single debuted at number 3 on the Oricon Singles Chart and was the 95th best-selling single of 2004. It later went gold in April.

== Promotion and release ==
The song was first previewed by B'z, Tak Matsumoto's band, on their website on March 21, 2004, ten days before the single released. The song was then played live on various TV shows, including Hey! Hey! Hey! Music Champ and Music Station Special.

== Track listing ==
All music is composed by Tak Matsumoto.

No.	Title	Lyrics	Length
1.	"Oh Japan (Our Time Is Now)"	Eric Martin, Jack Blades	4:09
2.	"Trapped"	Martin, André Pessis	3:41
3.	"Oh Japan (Our Time Is Now)" (Karaoke)		4:09
4.	"Trapped" (Karaoke)		3:41
Total length:			15:40

== Personnel ==
Tak Matsumoto Group

- Tak Matsumoto – guitars, rap on "Oh Japan (Our Time Is Now)"
- Eric Martin – lead vocals
- Jack Blades – bass

Additional musicians

- Brian Tichy – drums
- Shinichiro Ohta – background vocals on "Trapped"

== Charts ==
=== Weekly charts ===
Chart (2004)	Peak position
Japan (Oricon)	3

=== Year-end charts ===
Chart (2004)	Position
Japan (Oricon)	95

== Certifications ==
Certifications for "Oh Japan (Our Time Is Now)"
Region	Certification	Certified units/sales
Japan (RIAJ)	Gold	100,000^{^}
^{^} Shipments figures based on certification alone.
