= Tak Matsumoto Group =

Japan-based rock supergroup

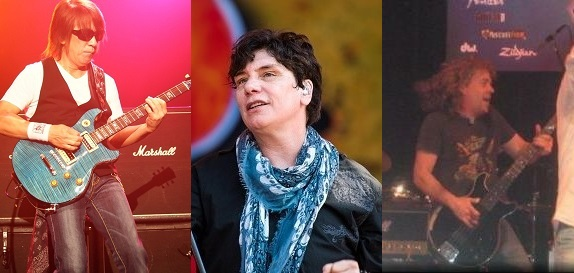
- From left to right: Tak Matsumoto, Eric Martin, and Jack Blades

Background information
- Also known as: TMG
- Origin: Japan
- Genre: Hard rock
- Years active: 2004; 2024
- Labels: Vermillion; Frontiers
- Spinoff of: B'z; Mr. Big; Night Ranger; Damn Yankees
- Members: Tak Matsumoto; Eric Martin; Jack Blades; Matt Sorum
- Website: takmatsumotogroup.com

Tak Matsumoto Group (often abbreviated as TMG) is a supergroup consisting of members from several bands around the world. It includes Tak Matsumoto, Eric Martin, and Jack Blades. From July to September 2004, they embarked on their "Dodge the Bullet Tour" of Japan.

After a single, an album, 20 shows, and a live video, the band did not perform again until twenty years later in 2024. In a 2016 interview with Rolling Stone India, Martin said he asked Matsumoto every year about a possible reunion, to which Matsumoto always answered, "Let me think about it".

On February 28, 2024, in an interview with Rockpages.gr, Jack Blades revealed that the band would be making a second album. A week later, on March 8, the band officially announced its reformation 20 years after its initial conception and would be releasing a second album and hold a nationwide tour across Japan.

== Lineup ==
Official members

- Tak Matsumoto (B'z) – guitar, leader
- Eric Martin (Mr. Big) – lead vocals
- Jack Blades (Night Ranger, Damn Yankees, Shaw Blades) – bass, backing vocals
- Matt Sorum (Guns N' Roses, Velvet Revolver) – drums, percussion (2024)

Support members

- Brian Tichy (Stevie Salas, Pride & Glory, Whitesnake, The Dead Daisies) – studio drums (2004)
- Cindy Blackman (Wallace Roney, Lenny Kravitz, Santana) – studio drums (2004)
- Chris Frazier (Steve Vai, Whitesnake, Foreigner) – live drums (2004)

== Discography ==
=== Albums ===
Title	Album details	Peak chart positions
Title	Album details	JPN Oricon
TMG I	Released: June 23, 2004; Label: Vermillion; Formats: CD	1
TMG II	Released: September 18, 2024; Label: Vermillion; Formats: CD, CD+BD	3
TMG III Sayonara	Released: October 14, 2026; Label: Vermillion; Formats: CD	3

=== Singles ===
Year	Album	Peak chart positions	Label
Year	Album	JPN	Label
2004	"Oh Japan (Our Time Is Now)"	3	Vermillion
2024	"Guitar Hero"	—	Vermillion
2024	"Eternal Flames" (featuring Babymetal)	—	Vermillion

=== Video ===
Title	Album details	Peak chart positions
Title	Album details	JPN Oricon
Dodge the Bullet	Released: December 15, 2004; Label: Vermillion; Formats: DVD, VHS	8

== Music videos ==
Year	Song	Release date	Format	Ref.
2024	Eternal flames (feat. Babymetal)	September 11, 2024	YouTube version	
2024	Guitar Hero	September 11, 2024	YouTube version	
