= New Horizon (Tak Matsumoto album) =

Studio album by Tak Matsumoto
- Released: (Japan) April 30, 2014
- Genre: Jazz fusion
- Length: 46:59
- Label: Vermillion Records (Japan)
- Producer: Tak Matsumoto and Paul Brown

Tak Matsumoto chronology
Strings of my Soul (2012)	New Horizon (2014)	enigma (2016)

New Horizon is the fifteenth solo studio album by Japanese guitarist Tak Matsumoto, of B'z fame. It is an instrumental album (except for "Feel Like a Woman Tonite", with guest vocals by American singer Wendy Moten) and it was released by Vermillion Records on April 30, 2014, in Japan. The album debuted at number 3 on both the Japanese Oricon weekly album chart and the Billboard Japan album chart.

Some tracks of the album are not new; the title track was featured in a series of commercials by Japanese transportation company Sagawa Express, "Black Jack" is a rerecorded version of the Black Jack Special theme song, and "Rain" had been already performed live during their 25th anniversary tour. The album also features three covers: "Take 5", which had already been covered in Matsumoto's debut solo album Thousand Wave, and two other tracks by Japanese musicians, the only tracks with Japanese-language titles.

== Track listing ==
All music is composed by Tak Matsumoto, except where noted.

Japanese edition
No.	Title	Music	Length
1.	"New Horizon"		4:39
2.	"Take 5" (The Dave Brubeck Quartet cover)	Paul Desmond	3:34
3.	"Feel Like a Woman Tonite" (featuring Wendy Moten)		3:53
4.	"Rodeo Blues"		3:15
5.	"Island of Peace"		5:23
6.	"That's Cool"		3:19
7.	"Shattered Glass"		4:57
8.	"月の明かり (Tsuki No Akari)" (Light of the Moon)	Masahiro Kuwana	5:26
9.	"Reason to be..."		4:01
10.	"Black Jack"		4:33
11.	"学生街の喫茶店 (Gakuseigai No Kissaten)" (Once Upon a Love)	Kohichi Sugiyama	3:59
12.	"Rain"		5:39
Total length:			46:59

The American and European editions come with a slightly different track list (with "Take 5" as the opening track and the title track coming next) and the two Japanese-language titled tracks translated to English

== Personnel ==
- Tak Matsumoto – guitars on all tracks, arrangements

=== Session members ===
- Wendy Moten – vocals on "Feel Like a Woman Tonite"
- John Ferraro – drums
- Lee Laing – drums, keyboards and wah guitar on "Feel Like a Woman Tonite"
- Shane Gaalaas – drums on "Rain"
- Lenny Castro – percussion on "Take 5"
- Travis Carlton – bass on track 1, 6, 9, 10, 11
- Bryant Siono – bass on "Feel Like a Woman Tonite"
- Barry Sparks – bass on "Rain"
- David Enos – wood bass on tracks 2, 4, 5, 7, 8
- Akira Onozuka – electric piano on tracks 1, 4, 6; piano on tracks 5, 7, 8, 9; Wurlitzer on "Black Jack" and "Gakuseigai No Kissaten"; organ on "Rain"
- Greg Vail – saxophone on tracks 1, 3, 4, 6, 10; flute on tracks 2, 3, 7; tenor saxophone on "New Horizon" and "That's Cool"
- Greg Adams – trumpet on tracks 1, 3, 4, 6, 10
- Lee Thornburg – trombone on tracks 1, 3, 4, 6, 10
- Hiroko Ishikawa of Lime Ladies Orchestra – strings on tracks 5, 7, 8

=== Technical staff ===
- Hideyuki Terachi – arrangement
- Hiroyuki Kobayashi – recording; mixing on tracks 5, 8, 9, 11, 12; engineering
- Paul Brown – recording and engineering on tracks 1, 2, 3, 4, 6, 7, 10; mixing on tracks 1, 2, 3, 4, 6, 7, 10; arrangement on "Feel Like a Woman Tonite"
