= Tak Matsumoto =

Japanese musician

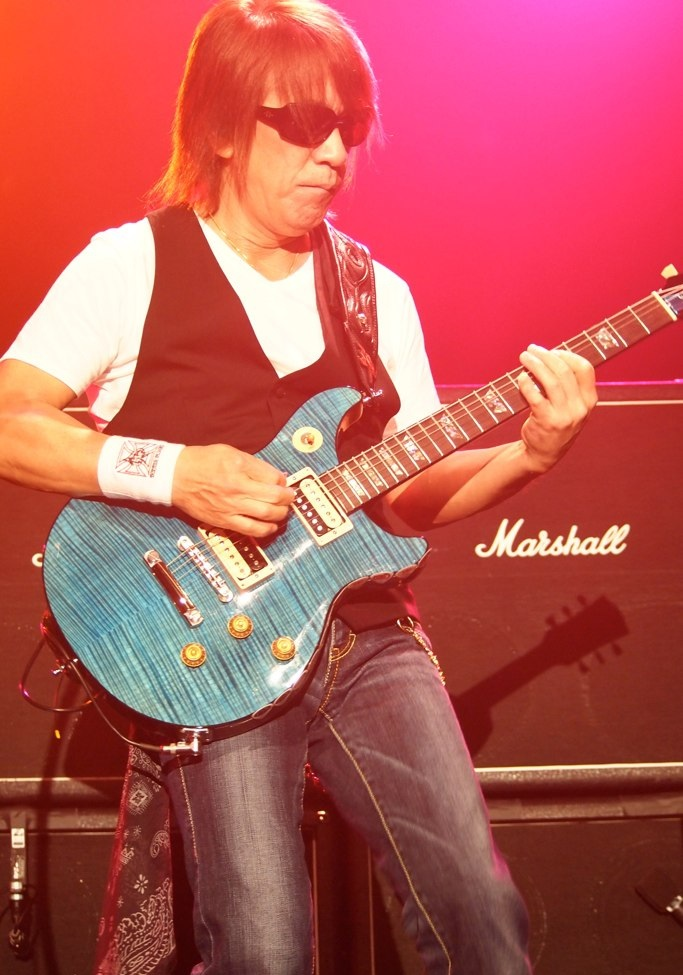
- Matsumoto performing in 2012

Background information
- Born: Takahiro Matsumoto; March 27, 1961 (age 65); Toyonaka, Osaka, Japan
- Genres: Hard rock; blues; jazz; pop; heavy metal; instrumental rock
- Occupations: Musician, songwriter, record producer
- Instruments: Guitar, vocals
- Years active: 1981–present
- Labels: Vermillion; Favored Nations
- Member of: B'z, Tak Matsumoto Group
- Website: houseofstrings.jp

Takahiro Matsumoto (松本 孝弘, Matsumoto Takahiro; born March 27, 1961, in Toyonaka, Osaka) is a Japanese musician, songwriter and record producer. He is best known as the guitarist and main composer of the rock duo B'z, the best-selling music act in their native Japan by certifications. He also has a successful solo career where, in addition to winning several Japan Gold Disc Awards, he won the Grammy Award for Best Pop Instrumental Album for Take Your Pick (2010), which he made in collaboration with Larry Carlton. Matsumoto is only the fifth guitarist in the world to have his own Gibson signature model guitar.

== Career ==
Matsumoto was inspired to pick up a guitar at the age of 13 when he heard Eric Clapton's playing on The Beatles song "While My Guitar Gently Weeps" for the first time. He reportedly bought his first electric guitar at age 15, a Japanese Gibson Les Paul, after hearing Deep Purple's guitarist Ritchie Blackmore play "Smoke on the Water on the live album Made in Japan. Matsumoto has said over the years that he has many favorite artists, from whom he has drawn much inspiration, from hard rock, particularly Deep Purple, Led Zeppelin, Aerosmith and Van Halen, and Michael Schenker. He has also cited a love of classical music, which was the catalyst for the incorporation of strings into many B'z compositions. He has also worked with Tokyo Ska Paradise Orchestra for many years, and their work often appears on many of the earlier B'z albums.

Matsumoto attended jazz school, but when he started working as a session musician and supporting tours like TM Network, his musicianship was cemented. His exposure to a myriad of styles helped him to meld his own unique blend, incorporating elements of his jazz training, blues (his incorporation of the style known as "Kansai Blues" is well known), classical, heavy metal, rock, and ska. Matsumoto continued his session work throughout the early and mid-1980s with acts such as Mari Hamada. He formed the Urusakute Gomenne Band (うるさくてゴメンねBAND) in 1986 with former Oz members Carmen Maki and Yoshihiro Naruse, Make-Up vocalist Nobuo Yamada, and Daddy Takechiyo & Tokyo Otoboke Cats drummer Soul Toul. They released a live album the following year. Jumping on the emerging solo instrumental trend catching on in Japan, Matsumoto recorded the solo album Thousand Wave. He worked with future globe headliner Tetsuya Komuro as a touring guitarist for Komuro's band TM Network. "99", a simple instrumental incorporating some blistering fretwork, is considered one of his finest works.

After his solo album, Matsumoto decided to try his hand at starting his own band. With his session work behind him and a burgeoning production career, he started to search for a singer. After being presented with a tape from an unknown session singer known as Koshi Inaba, Matsumoto was blown away. Their first recorded session was a rendition of "Let It Be" and "Oh! Darling" by The Beatles, and even though the amp blew out, Matsumoto knew he had his new singer. Matsumoto and Inaba formed the duo B'z and debuted in September 1988. B'z has continued to be one of the most successful bands in the history of Japanese music, helped by the pairing of two very different musical directions. Matsumoto always drew his tastes from blues, classical, and jazz, while Inaba preferred rock music. Matsumoto has ongoing friendships with musicians such as Barry Sparks, Marty Friedman, Billy Sheehan, Eddie Van Halen, Eric Martin, Jack Blades, Joe Perry, Pat Torpey, Steven Tyler, and Steve Vai, with whom Matsumoto and Inaba recorded the song "Asian Sky" from the 1999 album, The Ultra Zone. Billy Sheehan recorded tracks for 1999's Brotherhood album, as well as touring (along with Shane Gaalaas) as support musicians for 2002's Green Live-Gym Tour. In 2002, Matsumoto contributed music to two songs ("Don't Stop Music!" and "Koiuta") on Misia's fourth album, Kiss in the Sky; she invited him to be a part of the album after discovering his solo work.

Matsumoto's 2003 solo album The Hit Parade was chosen as one of the Best Rock & Pop albums of the year at the 18th Japan Gold Disc Awards. In 2004, he formed the "Tak Matsumoto Group" (TMG) with Eric Martin on vocal, Jack Blades on bass, and various guest drummers, namely Brian Tichy and Cindy Blackman, forging ahead with his own brand of musical genius. Matsumoto played guitar, produced the album, and wrote songs while Eric and Jack wrote lyrics. In March, the single "Oh Japan ~Our Time Is Now~", was released. The album TMG I, which made Matsumoto go back and forth to the US for the recording, was released on June 23. Matsumoto said he had this project idea for a long time. The album mixes rock and oriental sounds. The album topped the Oricon Albums Chart in the first week. Matsumoto energetically kept working; on July 18, 19 and 20, he had a collaboration concert with Tokyo Symphony Orchestra at Suntory Hall. At this special concert, named "Tokyo Special Collaboration 2004 Matsumoto Takahiro -HANA-", Matsumoto played the B'z hit "Love Phantom" and the solo number "HANA" with only his guitar and Orchestra. Soon after, TMG started its tour rehearsal. From July 30, the "Dodge The Bullet" tour started at Zepp Fukuoka. Chris Frazier who played songs on the B'z album Big Machine joined as the drummer for this tour. TMG had 16 shows in 8 locations including the last show at Nihon Budokan on September 7. In November, Matsumoto established his own label, "House of Strings", which emphasizes guitarists and string musicians. He recorded again at a studio with songs played with an orchestra in July and released it as the first House of Strings CD with the same title on the album. It is an instrumental album including Christmas numbers such as "Itsuka no Merry Christmas" and "Holy Night".

In 2005, he scored the soundtrack for the film Ultraman: The Next, while the next year wrote the music of "Real Face" for KAT-TUN. According to Oricon, "Real Face" became the best-selling Japanese single in 2006. In 2010, after the tour "Ain't No Magic" with B'z, Matsumoto worked with guitarist Larry Carlton. Together they released an album titled Take Your Pick on June 2, 2010, available in Japan and around the world. The album was considered for nomination for nine categories of the 2011 Grammy Awards, and ended up winning the award for Best Pop Instrumental Album. It also won Jazz Album of the Year at the 25th Japan Gold Disc Awards. Together they embarked on a nationwide tour to support the album, with Matsumoto saying that he "felt a little nervous playing 'Room 335' with Mr. Larry Carlton every night". In 2016, Matsumoto released a three-track EP called Enigma, followed in 2017 by a collaboration album between himself and Hawaiian artist Daniel Ho, Electric Island, Acoustic Sea.

Matsumoto's albums Strings of My Soul (2012) and New Horizon (2014) each won the Japan Gold Disc Award for Instrumental Album of the Year. He won the award a third time for 2020's Bluesman.

On March 8, 2024, TMG officially announced its reformation, with a second album and a nationwide tour across Japan in the works.

== Legacy ==
Matsumoto, through his B'z fame, is credited for the "resurrection and reinvention of the Japanese guitar hero", alongside, and in comparison to, X Japan guitarist hide, as a model of guitarist more interested in technique, technology, and equipment, popularizing the electric guitar as a mass media product in Japan. Terry Burrows considered him the "most highly regarded guitarist to emerge from Asia". Matsumoto ranked first in a 2011 poll conducted by the Japanese search engine goo on who the Japanese people thought was the best guitarist to represent Japan. In 2019, Matsumoto's song "1090 ~Thousand Dreams~" (1090 〜千夢一夜〜) was named the 51st best guitar instrumental by Young Guitar Magazine. In April 2022, the Japanese government awarded Matsumoto the Medal with Dark Blue Ribbon for his charitable contributions.

== Musical equipment ==
Matsumoto was given his own Signature Model Les Paul from Gibson in 1999. Matsumoto was added to the Gibson signature artist club as the first guitarist from Asia. He currently holds the record with 7 different signature models produced, including "Model Double Cutaway". His Les Paul model was also adapted into an Epiphone. In recent years, the signature model "Doublecut Custom Ebony" was released.

=== Early career ===
1. 'Tak' Matsumoto Yamaha MGM Signature Model (1988–1989)
2. 'Tak' Matsumoto Yamaha MGM-II Signature Model (1990–1992)
3. 'Tak' Matsumoto Yamaha MGM-III Signature Model (1993–1995)
4. Gibson Les Paul Standard Gold Top (1991–1998)
5. Music Man EVH Signature Model (1995–1998)
6. (Mesa Boogie) Mark III head amp (1985–1991)
7. VHT 100 watt rack-mounted heads (1985–1991)
8. (Mesa Boogie) 2 channel Dual Rectifier 100 watt (1992–1995)
9. (Mesa Boogie) 4 X 12 celestion speaker (Rebadged to a Ferrari emblem)
10. Rockman XPR (1988–1997)
11. Marshall JCM 800 100 watt heads (1994)
12. Marshall 4x12's with Celestion speakers (Rebadged "Matsumoto") (1992–1997)
13. Peavey 5150 guitar amp (1996–2000)
14. Peavey 5150II 100 watt amplifier (2000–2002)
15. EMB Audio Remote wah system

=== 2002–present ===
1. Gibson 'Tak' Matsumoto Signature Model (4 types)
2. 2 ESP Custom Shop Craft House Eclipses (blue burst floyd, amber burst)
3. Bogner Ecstasy Classic 100 watt Amplifiers
4. Bogner Uberschall 100 Watt Amplifiers
5. Bogner "Rei" 4x12 cabinets (with specially voiced custom speakers)
6. Budda Budwah
7. Digitech Whammy Pedal
8. Taurus Distortion Pedal
9. Dunlop 1.00 Guitar Picks
10. Sadowsky Tokyo Stratocaster Type (2006, from the Monster's Garage)
11. Music Man EVH Signature Model (2018-Present)

Matsumoto has also amassed a substantial guitar collection, including the following:

1. 1870 Martin C-7 Acoustic Guitar
2. 1937 Martin 000-18 Acoustic Guitar
3. 1952 Fender Telecaster (Butterscotch Blonde)
4. 1954 Fender Stratocaster (Tobacco Sunburst)
5. 1956 Gibson Les Paul Goldtop (with 'Soapbar' pickups)
6. 1959 Gibson Les Paul Flametop (with PAF pickups)
7. 1962 Fender Stratocaster (Fiesta Red)
8. 1962 Gibson SG

Matsumoto is also an avid collector of older guitar amplifiers, as well as an accomplished bass player. Aside from guitars, he also owns other instruments, such as a few sitars, electric and otherwise.

== Discography ==
=== Solo works ===
==== Albums ====
Title	Album details	Peak chart positions
Title	Album details	JPN Oricon
Thousand Wave	Released: May 21, 1988; Label: Tokuma Japan; Formats: CD, digital download, streaming	58
Wanna Go Home	Released: April 22, 1992; Label: BMG Victor; Formats: CD, digital download, streaming	3
Thousand Wave Plus	Released: October 7, 1996; Label: Vermillion; Formats: CD, digital download, streaming	25
Knockin' "T" Around	Released: April 14, 1999; Label: Vermillion; Formats: CD, digital download, streaming	5
Dragon From The West (西辺来龍)	Released: February 27, 2002; Label: Vermillion; Formats: CD, digital download, streaming	5
Hana (華)	Released: February 27, 2002; Label: Vermillion; Formats: CD, digital download, streaming	4
The Hit Parade	Released: November 26, 2003; Label: Vermillion; Formats: CD	2
House of Strings	Released: November 24, 2004; Label: Vermillion; Formats: CD, digital download, streaming	7
Theatre of Strings	Released: October 19, 2005; Label: Vermillion; Formats: CD	9
Strings of My Soul	Released: June 20, 2012; Label: Vermillion; Formats: CD, CD+DVD, digital download	4
New Horizon	Released: April 20, 2014; Label: Vermillion; Formats: CD, digital download, streaming	3
enigma	Released: April 6, 2016; Label: Vermillion; Formats: CD, CD+DVD, CD+BD, digital download, streaming	4
Bluesman	Released: September 2, 2020; Label: Vermillion; Formats: CD, 2xLP, CD+DVD, digital download, streaming	3
The Hit Parade II	Released: August 28, 2024; Label: Vermillion; Formats: CD, CD+BD	7

==== Singles ====
Year	Album	Chart positions (JP)	Label
1991	'88 ~ Love Story/Love Ya"	8	Tokuma Japan
1992	"#1090 Thousand Dreams": Music Station opening theme	3	BMG Victor
1999	"The Changing"	3	Room
2003	Ihoujin (異邦人) feat.Zard	2	Vermillion
2003	Imitation Gold (イミテイション・ゴールド) feat.Mai Kuraki	1	Vermillion

==== Promotion singles ====
Year	Single	Album	Reference
2013	"Strings Of My Soul"	Live Life	
2023	"Epic Match: The match everyone wanted"	TBA	
2024	"Battlebox"	TBA	
2024	"Glorious 70"	TBA	
2024	"Blue-Light Yokohama"	The Hit Parade II	
2024	"Kizudarake no Roller"	The Hit Parade II	
2024	"Roppongi Shinjuu"	The Hit Parade II	

=== Larry Carlton & Tak Matsumoto ===
==== Albums ====
Title	Album details	Peak chart positions
Title	Album details	JPN Oricon
Take Your Pick	Released: June 2, 2010; Label: Vermillion; Formats: CD, digital download	2

==== Video ====
Title	Album details	Peak chart positions
Title	Album details	JPN Oricon
LIVE 2010 "TAKE YOUR PICK" at BLUE NOTE TOKYO	Released: October 27, 2010; Label: Vermillion; Formats: DVD	15

=== Tak Matsumoto & Daniel Ho ===
==== Albums ====
Title	Album details	Peak chart positions
Title	Album details	JPN Oricon
Electric Island, Acoustic Sea	Released: February 8, 2017; Label: Vermillion; Formats: CD, digital download	7
