= Kealiʻi Reichel =

American singer (born 1962)

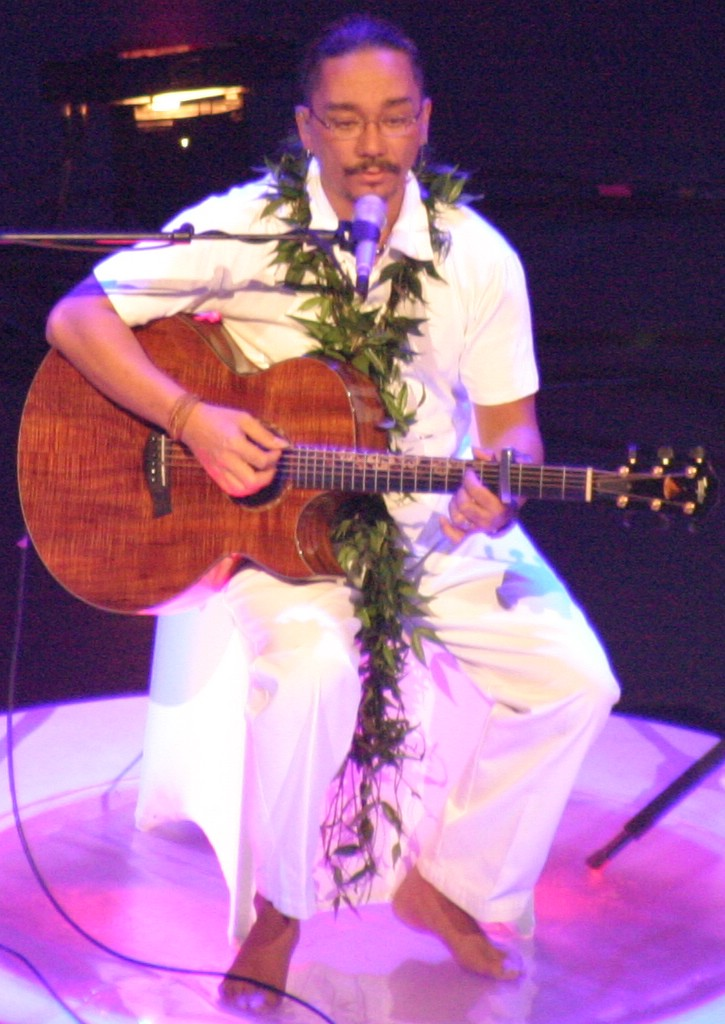

Background information
- Born: Carleton Lewis Kealiʻinaniaimokuokalani Reichel; June 26, 1962 (age 64)
- Origin: Lahaina, Hawaii, US
- Genre: Hawaiian music
- Occupations: Musician; Kumu Hula
- Instruments: Guitar, vocals
- Label: Punahele Records

Carleton Lewis Kealiʻinaniaimokuokalani Reichel (born June 26, 1962) popularly known as Kealiʻi Reichel (pronounced /keɪəˈliːʔiː raɪˈʃɛl/ kay-ə-LEE-ee rye-SHEL), is a singer, songwriter, choreographer, dancer, chanter, scholar, teacher, and personality from Hawaiʻi. He has spent his life educating the world about Hawaiian culture through music and dance.

Reichel was born and raised on the island of Maui. He grew up in the town of Lahaina where he attended Lahainaluna High School, however he spent weekends and summers with his maternal grandmother in the plantation town of Pāʻia. At the age of 24, Reichel was convicted of theft, and was sentenced to community service, which involved a study of Hawaiian culture. This marked a turning point in his life, as he decided to devote the rest of his life to the study and promotion of Hawaiian culture.

Reichel was one of the founding directors for Punana Leo O Maui, a Hawaiian language immersion pre-school. He has taught Hawaiian culture and language at the University of Hawaiʻi's Maui Community College, and he was the Cultural Resource Specialist and curator at the Bailey House Museum in Wailuku.

== Hawaiian mele (music) ==
Reichel studied Hawaiian dance and vocals under Kumu [hula] (dance instructor/choreographer/master) Pekelo Day and Pualani Kanakaʻole Kanahele, daughter of the kumu hula and Hawaiian scholar "Aunty" Edith Kanakaʻole. He later founded his own hālau hula (Hawaiian dance school) Halau hula o ka Makani Wili Makaha o Kauaʻula now called Halau Keʻalaokamaile. He founded this hālau at the age of 18 after graduating from Lahainaluna High School

In 1994, at the age of 32, he recorded and released a collection of Hawaiian traditional and contemporary music entitled Kawaipunahele on his own Punahele Productions record label, and began his career as a Hawaiian music superstar. Reichel's subsequent albums, Lei Haliʻa (1995), E O Mai (1997), and Melelana (1999), placed him securely at the top of the Hawaiian music entertainment industry. He is also featured in two anthology albums released by his record label, Pride of Punahele (1998) and Pride of Punahele 2 (2003).

In 2004, his album of the previous year, Ke'alaokamaile (2003), won four of the top awards at the 27th Annual [Na Hoku Hanohano Awards] (Hawaii's regional equivalent of the Grammy Awards) including Male Vocalist of the Year, Album of the Year, Hawaiian Album of the Year and Song of the Year. The album was also nominated for Best Hawaiian Music Album at the Grammys.

Reichel also won big at the 38th annual Na Hoku Hanohano Awards in 2015, with his album of the previous year, Kawaiokalena. He won five of the top awards: Male Vocalist of the Year, Album of the Year, Hawaiian Album of the Year and Entertainer of the Year and Hawaiian Language Songwriting and Performance. This release was also nominated for a Grammy the same year in the Best Regional Roots Music Album category.

Reichel's style most often includes vocals over a guitar, bass, and ukulele ensemble but may also include a Western (European-American) string quartet violin, viola and cello or traditional pre-1778 Hawaiian instruments. His vocals include Hawaiian language chanting and singing in both Hawaiian and English. Stage performances include dance in both traditional and modern hula forms. He also plays the guitar.

== In theater ==
Reichel performed in the Maui Youth Theater production of Jesus Christ Superstar as Judas Iscariot and in the Maui Academy of Performing Arts production of Jesus Christ Superstar as Jesus.

== International recognition ==
Reichel currently has contracts with JVC Victor Entertainment and Atlantic/Time-Warner. Kealiʻi Reichel's consistent placement in Billboard Magazine's World Music Charts has garnered him international attention. He has opened concerts for Bonnie Raitt, LeAnn Rimes, Céline Dion, and Sting. In addition to his regular concerts in Hawaiʻi, he has toured the United States mainland playing in such places as New York at Carnegie Hall and Town Hall, San Diego, San Francisco, Anaheim, Hollywood Bowl, Phoenix, Portland, Seattle and toured internationally with concerts and workshops in the South Pacific, Europe and Asia where he performs to sold out audiences.

Reichel is known not only for his artistry as a performer, songwriter and recording artist, but also for his work as an ambassador of Hawaiian culture to the rest of the world.

== Personal life ==
Reichel is married to Fred "Punahele" Krauss.

== Nā Hōkū Hanohano Awards ==
Favorite Entertainer of the Year

- 1995, 1996, 2000, 2007, 2015

Male Vocalist of the Year

- 1995, 1996, 2000, 2004, 2015

Most Promising Artist of the Year

- 1995

Album of the Year

- 1995 Kawaipunahele, 2000 Melelana, 2004 Keʻalaokamaile, 2014 Kawaiokalena

Anthology Album of the Year

- 2006 Kamahiwa: The Kealiʻi Reichel Collection Vol. 1

Song of the Year

- 2004 Ka Nohona Pili Kai

Hawaiian Album of the Year

- 1995 Kawaipunahele, 1996 Lei Haliʻa, 2000 Melelana, 2004 Keʻalaokamaile, 2014 Kawaiokalena

Haku Mele (new Hawaiian language composition; award to the composer )

- Kuʻu Pua Maeʻole (to Keali'i Reichel) 1996, Nematoda (to Puakea Nogelmeier) 1998

Liner Notes Award

- 2000, 2004, 2006, 2009

Music Video DVD of the Year

- 2008 Kukahi – Live in Concert

== Discography ==
- Kawaipunahele (1994), Punahele Productions
- Lei Hali'a (1995), Punahele Productions
- E O Mai (1997), Punahele Productions
- Melelana (1999), Punahele Productions
- Ke'alaokamaile (2003), Punahele Productions
- Sweet Island (2005), Punahele Productions
- Maluhia (2006), Punahele Productions
- Kawaiokalena (2014), Punahele Productions
