= Daniel Ho =

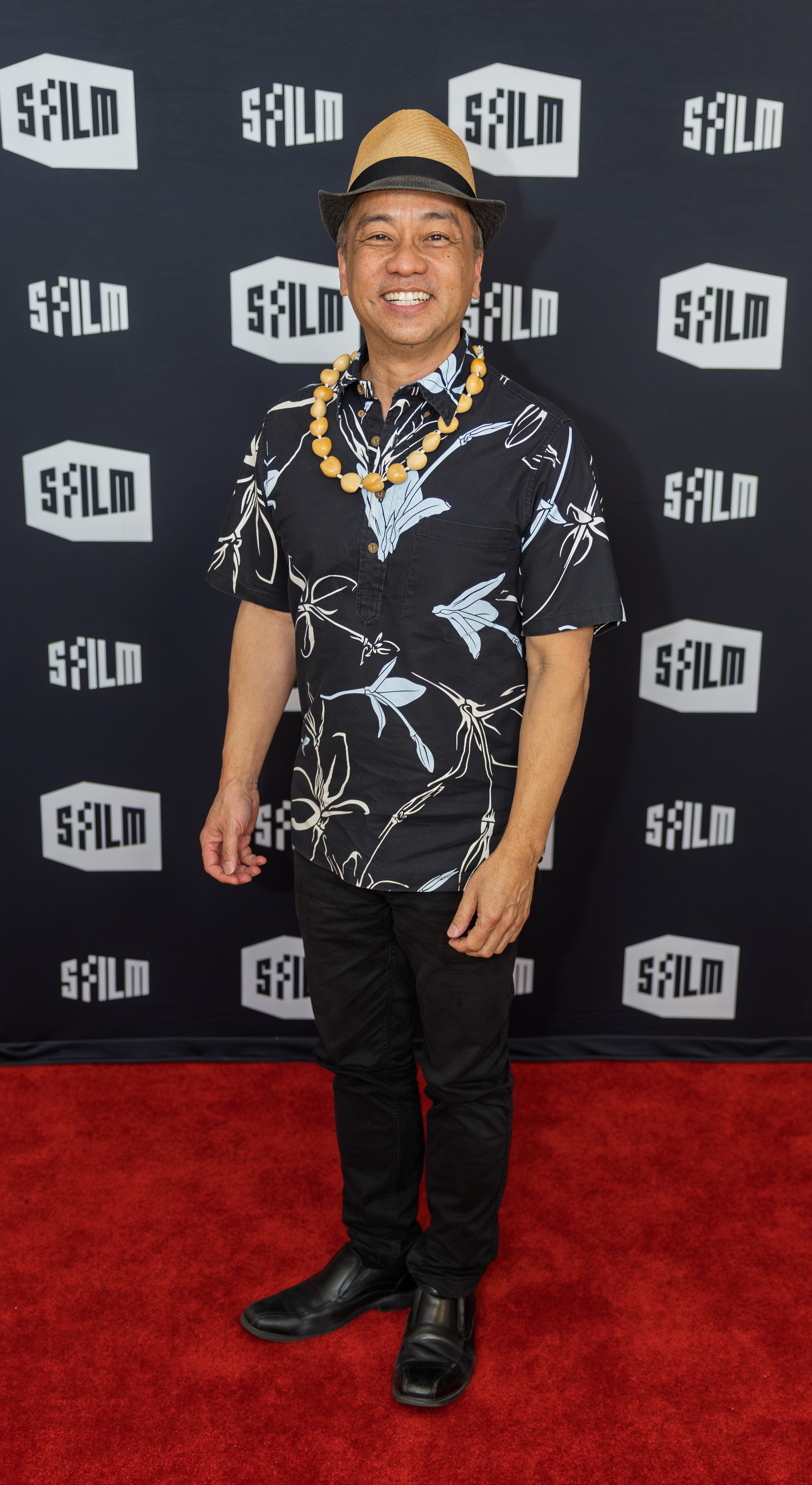
- Ho at SFFILM in 2026

Background information
- Born: March 5, 1968 (age 58); Kaimuki, Hawaiʻi
- Genre: Hawaiian
- Occupations: Musician; singer-songwriter; record producer; composer; arranger; audio engineer; clinician
- Instruments: Ukulele; guitar; vocals
- Website: www.danielho.com

Daniel Ho (born March 5, 1968) is an American musician, composer and producer specializing in innovative approaches to slack-key guitar, ukulele, and Hawaiian music. He has recorded 18 solo albums, some of which have won or were nominated for Grammy Awards, and has produced over 50 albums.

== Biography ==
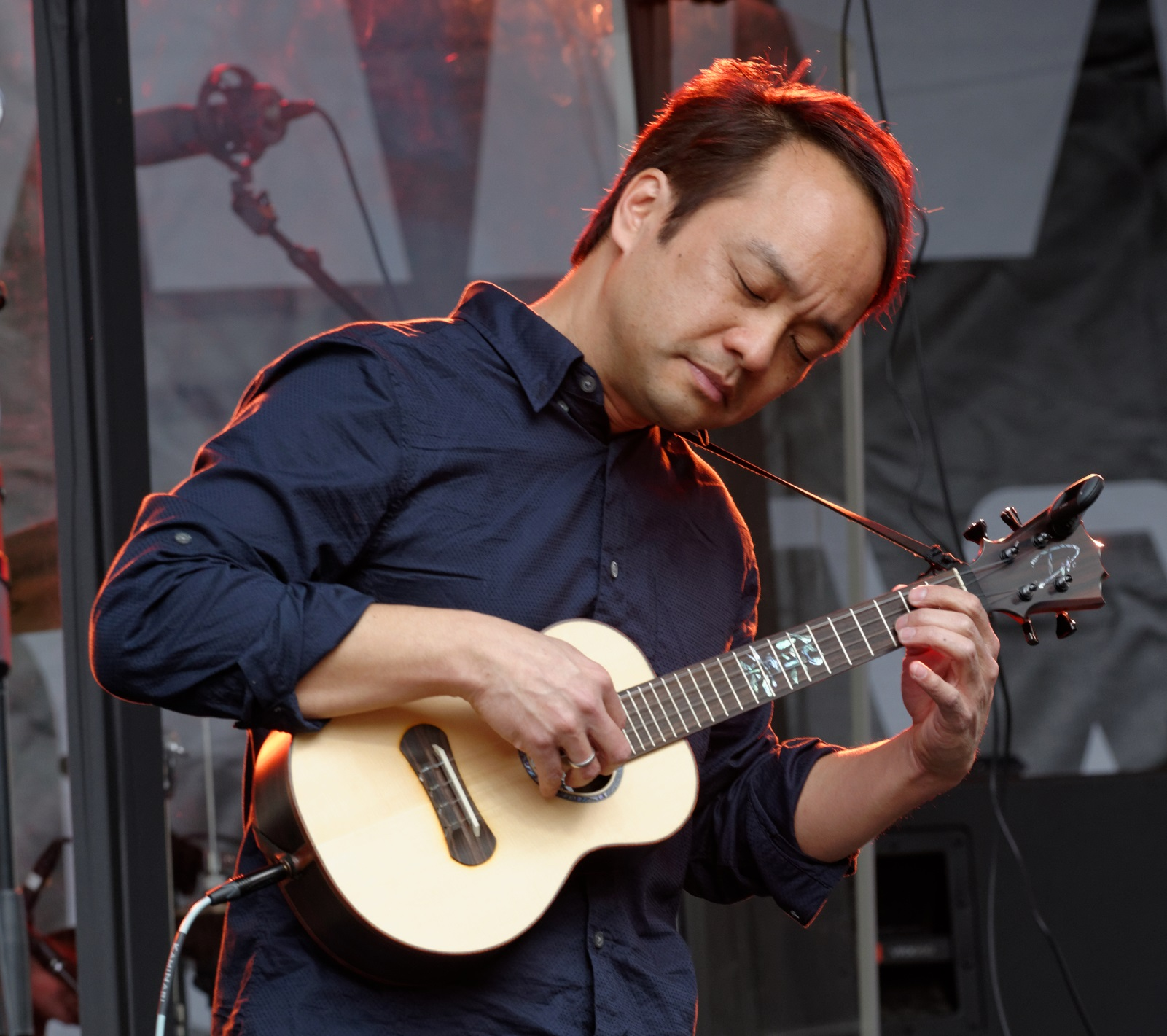
Ho performing in 2015

Of Chinese heritage, Ho was born in Kaimuki on Oahu, and currently lives in Los Angeles. He attended the Grove School of Music in Los Angeles, where he studied composition before returning home to attend the University of Hawaii at Manoa. After graduation, Daniel returned to Los Angeles, auditioned for and became a permanent member of smooth jazz group named Kilauea.

In the late 1990s, Ho started his own record company, Daniel Ho Creations (DHC), and recorded one of his first Hawaiian music albums with slack-key guitarist George Kahumoku, Jr. He has since recorded 18 solo albums, produced over 50 albums, served as a guest lecturer at Stanford University, performed as a soloist with the Honolulu Symphony, and received four Grammy Awards for Best Hawaiian Music Album as a producer. In 2009, he won his first Grammy Award for Best Hawaiian music album as an artist rather than as the producer of a compilation album, teaming up with Tia Carrere for the album 'Ikena. The DHC label has also received three Grammy nominations for Hawaiiana, He Nani, and Spirit of Hawaiian Slack Key Guitar, three Na Hoku Hanohano Awards and several nominations, including the 2009 release Aloha Pumehana by Darlene Ahuna.

In 2008 Ho appeared in and recorded several tracks for the film Forgetting Sarah Marshall, under the pseudonym the Coconutz. He sang on three tracks that are remakes of 20th century pop hits, translated into Hawaiian, "Nothing Compares 2 U", "Everybody Hurts", and "These Boots Are Made for Walkin'".

In 2014 Ho was featured on the March/April cover of Making Music.

Currently, his song "Watercolors" is highlighted on the United States Customs and Border Patrol Hotline (202-325-8000) as wait music.
