= Mr. Vocalist Best =

Compilation album by Eric Martin
- Released: April 6, 2011 (Japan)
- Recorded: 2008–2010
- Genre: Pop rock; standards; Christmas
- Length: 59:39
- Label: Sony Music Japan
- Producer: Eric Martin

Eric Martin chronology
Mr. Vocalist 3 (2010)	Mr. Vocalist Best (2011)	Mr. Rock Vocalist (2012)

Mr. Vocalist Best is a compilation album by American singer-songwriter Eric Martin. Released on April 6, 2011 exclusively in Japan by Sony Music Japan, the album compiles songs from Martin's four Mr. Vocalist albums from 2008 to 2010. Also included is the song "Inori", which was written and originally recorded by Yūji Sasaki for his aunt Sadako Sasaki, who was exposed to the atomic bombing of Hiroshima at the age of two and died of the effects ten years later in 1955. Two versions of the album were released: a single CD edition and a limited edition two-CD set with DVD.

The album peaked at No. 220 on Oricon's albums chart.

== Track listing ==
Disc 1
No.	Title	Writer(s)	Original artist	Length
1.	"Pride"	Tomoyasu Hotei	Miki Imai
2.	"First Love"	Hikaru Utada	Hikaru Utada
3.	"I Believe"	Ayaka Iida; Yoshihiko Nishio	Ayaka
4.	"Hanamizuki"	Yo Hitoto	Yo Hitoto
5.	"Hero"	Mariah Carey; Walter Afanasieff	Mariah Carey
6.	"Love Love Love (English Version)"	Miwa Yoshida; Masato Nakamura	Dreams Come True
7.	"Sekaijū no Dare Yori Kitto (Mr. Vocalist Version) (with Debbie Gibson)" ((世界中の誰よりきっと (MRV ver.), "Surely More Than Anyone in the World (MRV ver.)"))	Show Wesugi; Miho Nakayama; Tetsurō Oda	Miho Nakayama & Wands
8.	"Everything"	Misia; Toshiaki Matsumoto	Misia
9.	"Mata Kimi ni Koishiteru (with Emiri Miyamoto)" ((また君に恋してる, "I'm in Love with You Again"))	Gorō Matsui; Masaaki Mori	Fuyumi Sakamoto
10.	"Time After Time"	Cyndi Lauper; Rob Hyman	Cyndi Lauper
11.	"Nada Sōsō" ((涙そうそう, "Great Tears Are Spilling"))	Ryoko Moriyama; Begin	Rimi Natsukawa
12.	"Inori"	God Breath; Yūji Sasaki	Yūji Sasaki

Limited Edition Disc 1 bonus track
No.	Title	Writer(s)	Original artist	Length
13.	"Kawa no Nagare no Yō ni" ((川の流れのように, "Like the Flow of the River"))	Yasushi Akimoto; Akira Mitake	Hibari Misora

Limited Edition Disc 2
No.	Title	Writer(s)	Original artist	Length
1.	"Itsuka no Merry Christmas" (Itsuka no Merī Kurisumasu (いつかのメリークリスマス, "Merry Christmas Someday"))	Tak Matsumoto	B'z
2.	"Christmas Eve" (Kurisumasu Ibu (クリスマス・イブ))	Tatsuro Yamashita	Tatsuro Yamashita
3.	"Happy Xmas (War Is Over)"	John Lennon; Yoko Ono	John & Yoko/Plastic Ono Band
4.	"Sekaiju no Dare Yori Kitto (Eric Martin Solo Ver.)"	Wesugi; Nakayama; Oda	Miho Nakayama & Wands
5.	"Yuki no Hana (Live)" ((雪の華(LIVE), "Snowflakes"))	Satomi; Ryoki Matsumoto	Mika Nakashima
6.	"Love"	Hideki Imamura; Yasushi Nakagawa; Kazuma Endou; Daita Ito; Junji Sakuma	Siam Shade
7.	"Can't Take My Eyes Off You"	Bob Crewe; Bob Gaudio	Various
8.	"Love Is Alive"	Eric Martin; Andre Pessis; Geo	Eric Martin

Limited Edition DVD
No.	Title	Writer(s)	Original artist	Length
1.	"Pride" (Music video)	Hotei	Miki Imai
2.	"Itsuka no Merry Christmas" (Music video)	Matsumoto	B'z
3.	"Mata Kimi ni Koishiteru (with Emiri Miyamoto)" (Music video)	Matsui; Mori	Fuyumi Sakamoto
4.	"You've Got a Friend" (A Special Night in Tokyo Ver.)	Carole King	Carole King
5.	"To Be with You" (A Special Night in Tokyo Ver.)	Martin; David Grahame	Mr. Big

== Charts ==
Chart (2011)	Peak position
Japanese Albums (Oricon)	220
