= Hitoto =

Hitoto is a surname. Notable people with the surname include:

- Roger Hitoto (born 1969), Democratic Republic of the Congo footballer
- Tae Hitoto (一青 妙, born 1970), Japanese actress
- Yo Hitoto (一青 窈, born 1976), Japanese singer
