= Crazy World =

Crazy World may refer to:

- Crazy World (Scorpions album), 1990
- Crazy World (Boys Like Girls album), 2012
- "Crazy World" (Young Jeezy song), 2008
- "Crazy World" (Big Trouble song), 1987
- "Crazy World" (Aslan song), 1993
- "Crazy World", a bonus track by ABBA from ABBA
- "Crazy World", a song by Ladyhawke from Ladyhawke
- "Crazy World," a song from the musical film Victor/Victoria and the later stage musical of the same name derived from it.
