= When the Love Is Good =

- American cover of "When the Love Is Good"

Single by Big Trouble

from the album Big Trouble
- B-side: "Last Kiss"
- Released: January 1988 (US); March 1988 (UK)
- Genre: Pop rock
- Length: 3:41
- Label: Epic Records
- Songwriter(s): Giorgio Moroder; Tom Whitlock
- Producer(s): Giorgio Moroder; Brian Reeves

Big Trouble singles chronology
"Crazy World" (1987)	"When the Love Is Good" (1988)

"When the Love Is Good" is a song by American female pop group Big Trouble, which was released as the second and final single from the band's only studio album, Big Trouble. It was written by Giorgio Moroder and Tom Whitlock, and produced by Moroder and Brian Reeves. "When the Love Is Good" reached No. 83 on the UK Singles Chart and remained in the Top 100 for three weeks.

The song's music video was directed by Marcelo Anciano and produced by AWGO.

== Critical reception ==
On its release, Billboard described the song as a "sweeping female-sung technoballad". In a review of Big Trouble, Saw Tek Meng of the New Straits Times commented: "Big Trouble show enough chops on tracks like "When the Love is Good" [and] "Crazy World" to indicate they should survive longer than the average female band."

== Track listing ==
7" single

1. "When the Love Is Good" - 3:41
2. "Last Kiss" - 4:50

7" single (American promo)

1. "When the Love Is Good" - 3:41
2. "When the Love Is Good" - 3:41

12 single (UK release)

1. "When the Love Is Good" - 3:41
2. "Lipstick" - 3:14
3. "Last Kiss" - 4:50

12 single (Dutch release)

1. "When the Love Is Good" - 3:41
2. "Last Kiss" - 4:50

== Personnel ==
Big Trouble

- Bobbie Eakes - lead vocals
- Julia Farey - bass, backing vocals
- Rebecca Ryan - keyboards, backing vocals
- Suzy Zarow - drums, backing vocals

Production

- Giorgio Moroder, Brian Reeves - producers of "When the Love Is Good" and "Lipstick"
- Giorgio Moroder - producer of "Last Kiss"

== Charts ==
Chart (1988)	Peak position
UK Singles Chart	83
