= Eric Martin (American singer) =

American rock musician (born 1960)

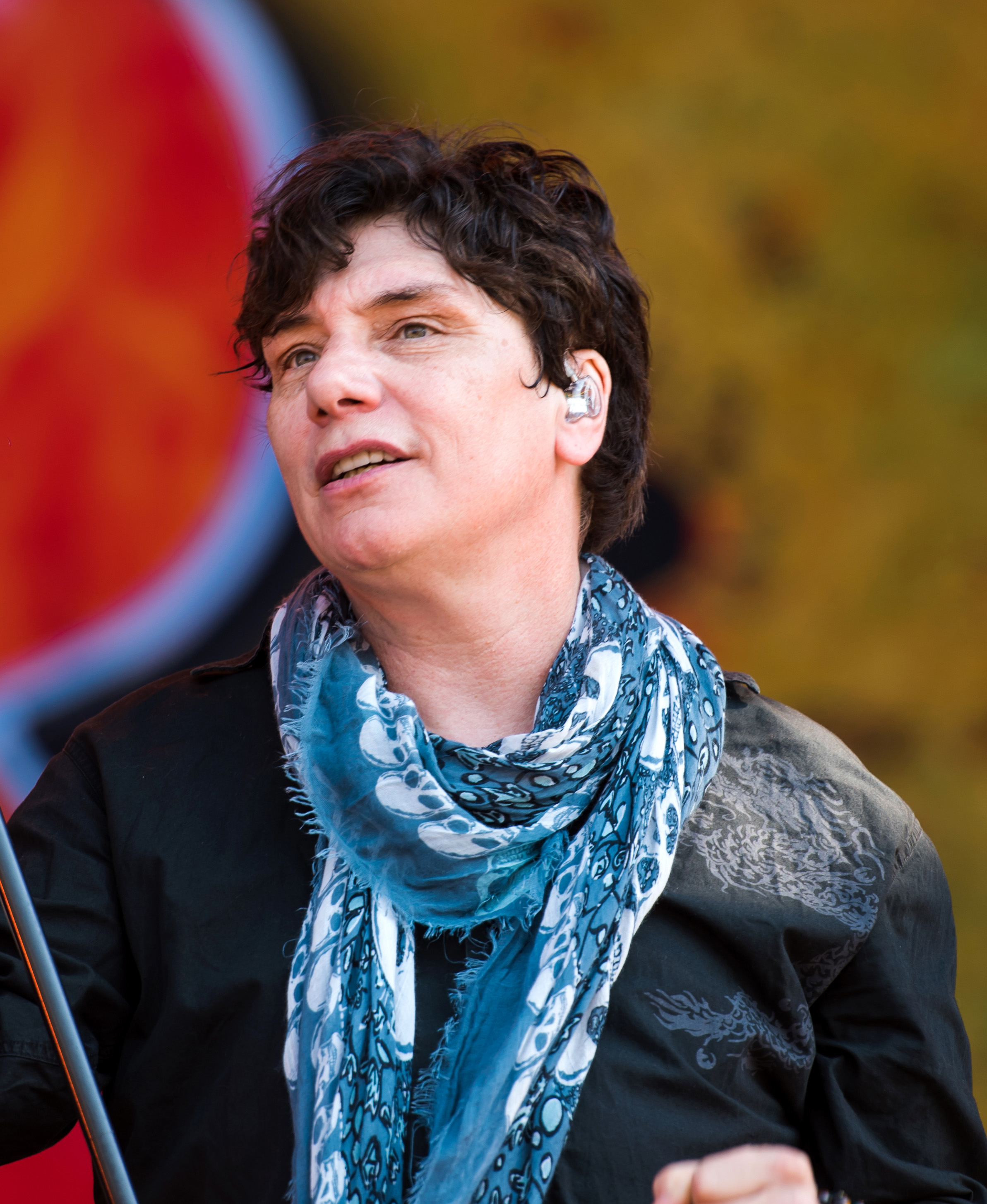
- Martin performing at Wacken Open Air in 2018

Background information
- Born: Eric Lee Martin; October 10, 1960 (age 66)
- Genres: Hard rock; pop rock; heavy metal; soul
- Occupations: Singer; musician; songwriter
- Instruments: Vocals; guitar; bass; piano; drums
- Years active: 1977–present
- Labels: Atlantic; Capitol; EastWest Japan; Frontiers; Pony Canyon; Sony Music Japan; Wowow Entertainment Inc.
- Member of: Mr. Big; Tak Matsumoto Group
- Formerly of: Eric Martin Band
- Website: ericmartin.com

Eric Lee Martin (born October 10, 1960) is an American rock singer who was active throughout the 1980s, 1990s, and 2000s, both as solo artist and as a member of various bands. He rose to prominence as the frontman for the hard rock band Mr. Big, which scored a big hit in the early 1990s with "To Be with You", a song that Martin wrote during his teen years.

== Early years ==
Eric Martin was born on October 10, 1960, to Frederick Lee "Pepper" Martin and Iris Martin. His father was from Cincinnati, Ohio, having been a drummer and was stationed in the military. As such, his family often moved where he was stationed, including to Germany and Italy. As a child, he listened to cast albums of musicals such as South Pacific and Hair. They eventually moved to Sacramento, California.

The Martin family finally settled in the San Francisco Bay Area in about 1976. Martin met up with some of the band members who would join him in his first successful venture: Kid Courage. Kid Courage opened for AC/DC for two shows in the Bay Area, which were AC/DC's first shows in America.

Martin was a drummer for a short while. Realizing it fit his personality better, he opted for frontman/lead vocalist in the next bands he joined. He played in a handful of teen rock groups with Randy Richardson, Fil Pearl and Ric Walz-Smith, such as S.F. Bloodshy and Backhome while attending Foothill High School in Sacramento, California. He performed in a punk band in the mid-1970s called The Innocents with Walz-Smith and Connie Champagne.

In 1974, Eric played college clubs with Jim Preston in The J.C. Michaels Band. During summer break, Martin joined a musical comedy workshop held at Mira Loma High School in Sacramento. He auditioned for the part of Judas; although he ultimately did not get the role, he did become the understudy. Martin credits the honing of his voice to his teacher, Judy Davis. She taught him diction, stamina, and breath-control.

Eric later joined Stark Raving Mad (which also included future Winger guitarist/keyboardist Paul Taylor) in Santa Rosa, California. Stark Raving Mad, which also included Donavan Stark and Brian Stark, cut a demo with Bearsville Records that was produced by Chris Nicks, brother of Stevie Nicks.

=== Musical influences ===
Martin grew up listening to both soul and rock icons in the 1970s, such as Otis Redding, Paul Rodgers, The Beatles, The Rolling Stones, Lynyrd Skynyrd, Edgar Winter, Free, and Humble Pie. When he was about 13 to 15 years old, while living in Italy, he was introduced musically to different artists under Motown Records and Stax/Volt Records.

== Career ==
=== 415 / Eric Martin Band (1978–1985) ===
Martin had decided to live independently by the age of 18. His first job was selling ice cream. Later, John Nymann, guitarist for the band Mile Hi, gave him a call and asked if he would want to form a new band together. The two had known each other since their former bands (Mile Hi and Kid Courage) had played together at the Mabuhay Gardens on Broadway in San Francisco. Nymann and Martin got people together from both their previous bands, and formed a new group named 415 in 1979. The band was named after the telephone area code for the San Francisco Bay Area, since every person in the band was from there.

Martin was 415's lead vocalist. He stated, "415 played hundreds of shows at area nightclubs, beer parties, even high school and college dances, before eventually headlining San Francisco's premiere night club – the Old Waldorf. Selling out in advance, word quickly spread about our dynamic live shows and soon we were opening for established acts like Billy Squier, Hall & Oates, Rick Springfield, Molly Hatchet, the Marshall Tucker Band, and Foreigner, to name a few. Eventually, without yet being signed to a recording contract, we played in front of 60,000 fans at Oakland Stadium at Bill Graham's Days on the Green Concert." The band became a popular local draw.

415 was later signed on to Elektra/Asylum Records under the management of Walter "Herbie" Herbert, Ron Chiarottino, and Sandy Einstein, who also managed the band Journey. The management decided to change the name of the band to the Eric Martin Band (EMB), as singer-named bands were popular during that time. EMB debuted their first album in 1983, entitled Sucker for a Pretty Face. The group appeared on American Bandstand and in various arena tours as the opening act for ZZ Top, Night Ranger, and Journey. In one interview, Eric mentioned that they "worked thousands of shows, from clubs, to frat house parties, Bill Graham concerts, opening for anybody and everybody." Despite continuing to land high-profile gigs as support for some of the most popular acts at the time, the band decided to split up in 1985 after returning from the ZZ Top tour.

During this period, Eric was considered for the position of lead singer for the band Toto on two occasions (replacing Bobby Kimball following his vocal issues) and then to replace David Lee Roth following his departure from Van Halen. Eric had an audition with Toto but following a "liquid lunch", the session didn't result in all members agreeing to him joining, though Steve Lukather was a strong advocate. In 1985, Eddie Van Halen heard a tape of Eric and invited him to audition. At San Francisco airport on the way to Los Angeles to meet with Van Halen, Eric met Sammy Hagar in the departure lounge who told him that he was on his way down to LA as he had already been told he was the new vocalist, so Eric did not take the flight so did not have the audition. Hagar indeed did become the new lead singer.

=== Mr. Big (1988–2002, 2009–present) ===
In 1988, Martin teamed up with Billy Sheehan, Pat Torpey, and Paul Gilbert to form Los Angeles supergroup Mr. Big. The band combined "shredding" musicianship with melodic vocal harmonies. The players' reputations generated immediate interest in fellow musicians, and the band was signed to Atlantic Records in 1989. Mr. Big recorded six studio albums between 1989 and 2002 before disbanding. The group were especially popular in Japan. In 2009, Mr. Big announced plans to reunite on Japanese radio. The group subsequently toured Europe and Southeast Asia and returned to recording.

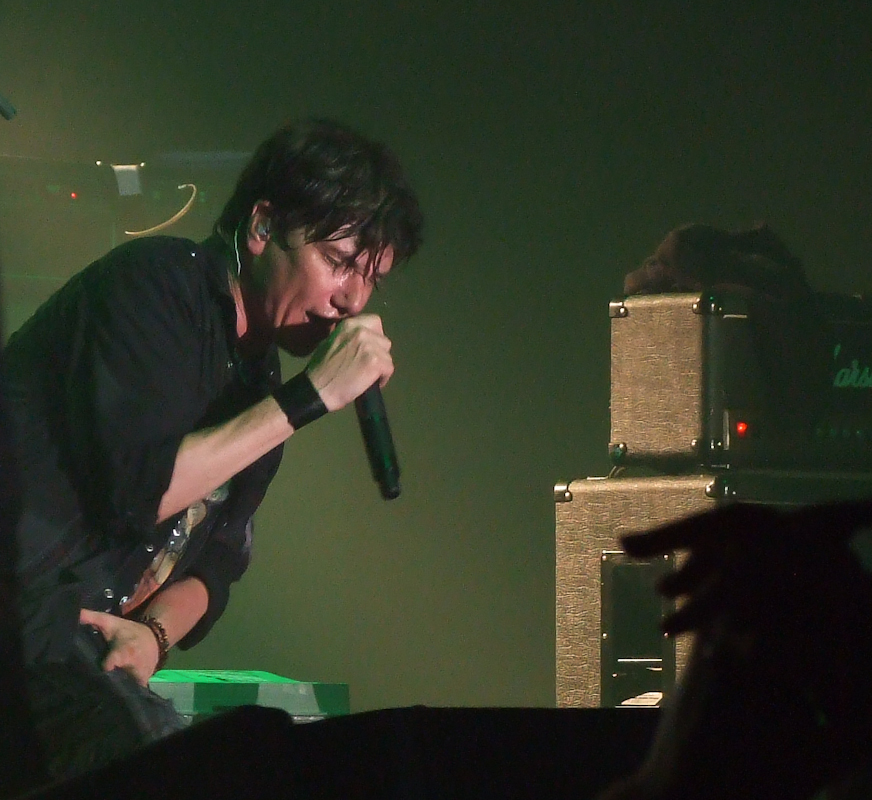
Martin at Festivalna Hall in Sofia, Bulgaria, 2011

On February 7, 2018, drummer Pat Torpey died from complications of Parkinson's disease at the age of 64. In October, Martin said the group planned to disband following their 2019 touring commitments, and stated, "It feels a little uncomfortable to keep going without Pat Torpey".

=== Solo projects (1998–present) ===
==== Solo albums ====
While in Mr. Big, Martin was also involved in other side projects. In 1995, Martin was the vocalist in The Power Rangers Orchestra, which also featured Guns N' Roses member Matt Sorum. Their version of "Go Go Power Rangers" was featured in Mighty Morphin Power Rangers: The Movie. Martin's third solo album, Somewhere in the Middle, was written during the two-year hiatus from Mr. Big. The CD was completed in 1998 and released in Japan, Southeast Asia, and Europe. Strong Japanese sales prompted a 1998 tour.

In 2002, Martin released the solo album I'm Goin' Sane. Martin also recorded the acoustic EP Pure. In 2003, Martin contributed his version of "Cheer Up" to the Japanese release Sincerely 2 – Mariya Takeuchi Song Book album. In 2004, Martin portrayed Mr. Niko on the rock opera concept album Genius – Episode 2: In Search of The Little Prince.

In 2004, Martin released the album Destroy All Monsters. The album's sound is something Eric calls "distorted pop" with a focus on his rock roots.

==== Tak Matsumoto Group ====
Later in 2002, Martin was contacted by Japanese musician Tak Matsumoto. Tak decided to put together a rock band called Tak Matsumoto Group, or TMG, which included himself on guitar, Martin on vocals, and Jack Blades (Night Ranger/Damn Yankees) on bass, and himself. They spent four months writing and recording TMG I in Los Angeles, which was released in 2004. The group did a 10-day promotional tour in Japan, and toured 20 cities from July to September, ending at the Budokan.

On March 8, 2024, the band announced its reformation, with a second album and a nationwide tour across Japan in the works. This ultimately led to the album TMG II, released on September 18, 2024, and the tour TMG Live 2024: Still Dodging the Bullet, which started September 19.

==== Work on different projects ====
From 2004 to 2007, Martin was involved in numerous projects while remaining near home. A more comprehensive collection of his works are available on Eric Martin's Official Site. His projects included singing tracks on albums of different composers/artists, singing for karaoke games, video games, and TV commercials, and joining benefit concerts all year round. Martin wrote and recorded the theme song for the Pride Fighting Championships, which was a major mixed martial arts organization.

Martin also wrote and recorded a song for guitar legend Ronnie Montrose's CD, 10x10. He sings along with nine other singers including Sammy Hagar, Edgar Winter, Davey Pattison, and Mark Farner. Martin was asked to perform "Guitar Man" with Ronnie Montrose, Denny Carmasi, and Ricky Phillips to take to the Sundance Film Festival. Martin also composed and performed a song called "Fly" for an Asahi Super Dry Beer commercial in Japan, which was accompanied by a music video.

The Nelson Brothers invited Martin to join them in an all-star band they were forming called Scrap Metal, which would perform classic heavy metal and rock 'n' roll hits from the 1980s and 1990s. On February 3, 2007, Scrap Metal played at a filmed MTV concert at the Mohegan Sun Hotel & Casino in Uncasville, Connecticut. A few months later, Martin appeared on Japanese jazz fusion band T-Square's album 33, where he was guest vocalist on the track "Tell the Truth".

In 2010, Martin participated in a tribute album titled Mister Bolin's Late Night Revival, a compilation of 17 previously unreleased tracks written by guitar legend Tommy Bolin, prior to his death in 1976. A percentage of the proceeds from this project were used to benefit the Jackson Recovery Centers.

In 2013, Martin was invited to be part of the metal opera project Avantasia, by Tobias Sammet. Martin played the role of a beggar on the album The Mystery of Time, performing "What's Left of Me" with Sammet. Martin appeared on Sammet's 2013 world tour in support of the album as one of the guest vocalists. He was also part of their 2016 world tour in support of the album Ghostlights, notably performing the guest vocal role in the songs "Dying for an Angel", "The Wicked Symphony" and "Twisted Mind".

==== Mr. Vocalist 1 and 2, solo touring ====
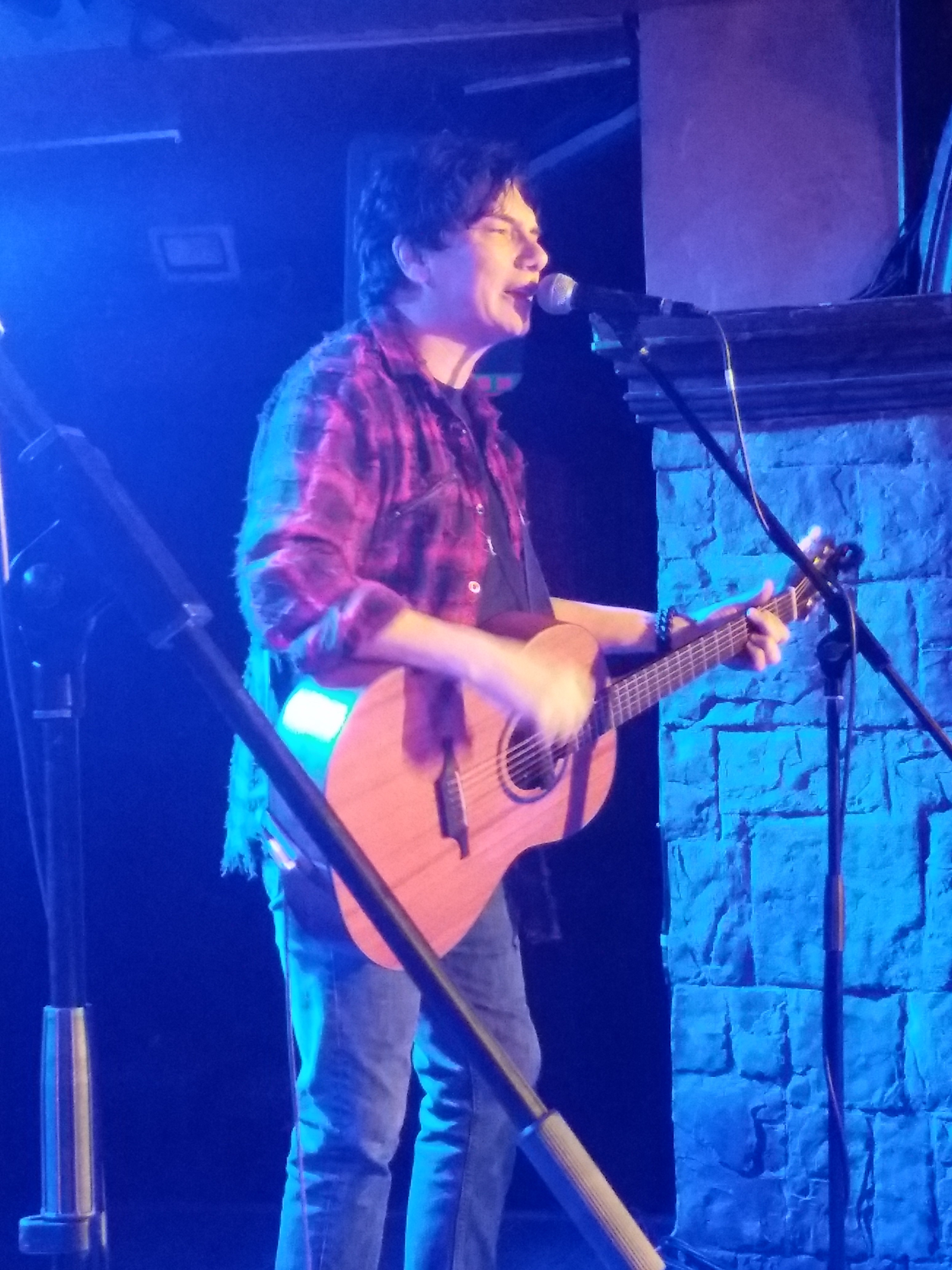
Martin performing in Spain in 2018

In early 2008, Martin was approached by Sony Japan to do a project wherein he would cover famous Japanese ballads sung by women. The album, entitled Mr. Vocalist, was released in November 2008. The album included ballads such as "I Believe" by Ayaka, "Yuki no Hana" by Mika Nakashima, and "M" by Princess Princess. In 2009, the album was followed by Mr. Vocalist 2, which topped the charts in Japan. For months, it continued to move along the country's top five albums.

From 2007 to 2009, Martin toured Europe, South America, and India, with different local bands backing him at each stop along the tour. Martin performed across the world with bands such as The Road Vultures from Argentina, Hayseed from Norway, Raw Like Sushi (a Mr. Big tribute band) from Italy, and John McNamara's band from Australia.

Martin was invited by the King of Tripura, Kirit Pradyot Deb Burman, to perform Mr. Big songs during the Rock Festival at Shillong. Martin and the band members (the Road Vultures) were graciously treated as state guests and were escorted upon arrival in India and during the concert. Amit Paul, a singer from the show Indian Idol, and other Indian celebrities, sang part of "To Be With You" with Eric.

Martin also toured with Richie Kotzen in South America, a former bandmate from Mr. Big. On October 10, 2012, Martin released the cover album Mr. Rock Vocalist. It features covers of Japanese songs such as "Alone" by B'z, "Honey" by L'Arc-en-Ciel and "Forever Love" by X Japan, and guest musicians such as Steve Stevens, Marty Friedman and John 5.

== Discography ==
=== Solo albums ===
- Eric Martin (1985)
- I'm Only Fooling Myself (1987)
- Somewhere in the Middle (1998)
- I'm Goin' Sane (2002)
- Destroy All Monsters (2004)
- Mr. Vocalist (2008)
- Mr. Vocalist 2 / Timeless (2009)
- Mr. Vocalist X'Mas (2009)
- Mr. Vocalist 3 (2010)
- Mr. Rock Vocalist (2012)
- Open Your Heart (2026)

=== Compilation albums ===
- Soul Sessions: The Capitol Years (1996)
- Love Is Alive: Works of 1985–2010 (2010)
- Mr. Vocalist Best (2011)

=== Extended plays ===
- Pure (2003)

=== Eric Martin Band ===
- Sucker for a Pretty Face (1983)

=== Tak Matsumoto Group ===
- TMG I (2004)
- TMG II (2024)

=== Guest appearances ===
- Big Trouble – Big Trouble (1987; duet on the track "What About You And Me")
- Michael Bolton – The Hunger (1987)
- Signal – Loud & Clear (1989)
- Todd Rundgren – Nearly Human (1989)
- Europe – Prisoners in Paradise (1991; co-writer of "All or Nothing")
- Lynyrd Skynyrd - Lynyrd Skynyrd 1991 (1991)
- Laura Branigan – Over My Heart (1993; co-writer of "Over My Heart")
- Sammy Hagar – Marching to Mars (1997; vocals on "Who Has The Right?")
- Mogg/Way – Edge of the World (1997)
- Lebocat – Flo's Barbershop (2002)
- Harry Hess – Just Another Day (2003)
- Mariya Takeuchi – Sincerely, Vol. 2: Mariya Takeuchi Song Book (2003)
- Various artists – Genius: A Rock Opera, Episode 2: In Search of the Little Prince (2004; as "Mr. Niko")
- Richie Zito's Avalon – Avalon (2006)
- Various artists – Genius: A Rock Opera, Episode 3: The Final Surprise (2007; as "Mr. Niko")
- Ted Nugent – Love Grenade (2007)
- T-Square – 33 (2007)
- Jun Senoue – The Works (2009)
- Debbie Gibson - Ms. Vocalist (2010)
- Pushking – The World as We Love It (2011)
- Avantasia – The Mystery of Time (2013)
- Mägo de Oz – Celtic Land (2013; on the track "Xanandra")
- Avantasia – Ghostlights (Live digibook edition bonus disc) (2016)
- Ronnie Montrose - 10x10 (2017; vocals and co-writer on "Heavy Traffic")
- Avantasia – Moonglow (2019)
- Jeff Scott Soto - The Duets Collection, Vol. 1 (2021)

=== Tribute album appearances ===
- Working Man – A Tribute to Rush (1996)
- Siam Shade Tribute (2010)
- Mister Bolin's Late Night Revival (2011)
- Sin-Atra (2011)
- Working Class Dogs: A Tribute to Rick Springfield (2012)
- L'Arc-en-Ciel Tribute (2012)

=== Soundtrack appearances ===
- Teachers soundtrack (1984) ("I Can't Stop the Fire")
- Iron Eagle soundtrack (1986) ("These Are the Good Times" and "Eyes of the World")
- The Amazing Spider-Man vs. The Kingpin (1993) ("Swing Time")
- Mighty Morphin Power Rangers soundtrack (1995)
- Mad About You - Music from the Television Series (1997) ("I Love The Way You Love Me")
- Daytona USA Circuit Edition soundtrack (1997)
- Pride Fighting Championships theme song "Last Man Standing" (2006)
