= Love Is Alive =

Love Is Alive may refer to:

== Albums ==
- Love Is Alive: Works of 1985–2010, a 2010 compilation album by Eric Martin
- Love is Alive, a 2017 EP by Louis the Child

== Songs ==
- "Love Is Alive" (Gary Wright song), from The Dream Weaver, 1975
- "Love Is Alive" (The Judds song), from Why Not Me, 1984
- "Love Is Alive" (Lea Michele song), from Places, 2017
- "Love is Alive", a song by Kate Ceberano from Pash, 1998
- "Love Is Alive", a song by Louis the Child featuring Elohim from Love Is Alive, 2013
- "Love is Alive", a 2013 song by Phil Vassar
