= Mr. Vocalist =

Studio album by Eric Martin
- Released: November 26, 2008 (Japan); March 9, 2009 (Hong Kong)
- Recorded: 2008
- Genre: Pop rock; standards
- Length: 60:24
- Label: Sony Music Japan; Sony Music Japan International (Korea)
- Producer: Eric Martin

Eric Martin chronology
Destroy All Monsters (2004)	Mr. Vocalist (2008)	Mr. Vocalist 2 (2009)

Mr. Vocalist is the sixth studio album by American singer-songwriter Eric Martin. Released on November 26, 2008 exclusively in Japan by Sony Music Japan, the album features Martin's English-language covers of popular female-oriented Japanese songs.

The album peaked at No. 12 on Oricon's albums chart.

Mr. Vocalist was released in Hong Kong as Mr. Vocalist (Asian Version) on March 9, 2009. This version features a different track listing with six tracks replaced with songs from Mr. Vocalist 2.

== Track listing ==
Mr. Vocalist
No.	Title	Writer(s)	Original artist	Length
1.	"Pride"	Tomoyasu Hotei	Miki Imai	5:42
2.	"Hanamizuki"	Yo Hitoto	Yo Hitoto	5:32
3.	"Anata no Kiss wo Kazoemashō (You Were Mine)" ((あなたのキスを数えましょう ~you were mine~, "Count Your Kisses (You Were Mine)"))	Ren Takayanagi; Hideya Nakazaki	Yuki Koyanagi	5:44
4.	"Everything"	Misia; Toshiaki Matsumoto	Misia	6:48
5.	"Precious"	Vincent Degiorgio; Berny Cosgrove; Kevin Clark	Yuna Ito	5:52
6.	"Time Goes By"	Mitsuru Igarashi	Every Little Thing	4:55
7.	"M"	Kyōko Tomita; Kaori Okui	Princess Princess	5:09
8.	"I Believe"	Ayaka Iida; Yoshihiko Nishio	Ayaka	4:54
9.	"Yuki no Hana" ((雪の華, "Snowflakes"))	Satomi; Ryoki Matsumoto	Mika Nakashima	5:46
10.	"The Voice ("Jupiter" English Version)"	Andreas Carlsson; Gustav Holst	Ayaka Hirahara	6:13
11.	"Love Love Love (English Version)"	Miwa Yoshida; Masato Nakamura	Dreams Come True	3:50
Total length:				60:24

Mr. Vocalist (Asian Version)
No.	Title	Writer(s)	Original artist	Length
1.	"Hero"	Mariah Carey; Walter Afanasieff	Mariah Carey
2.	"No One"	Alicia Keys; Kerry Brothers Jr.; George M. Harry	Alicia Keys
3.	"Precious"	Degiorgio; Cosgrove; Clark	Yuna Ito
4.	"There You'll Be"	Diane Warren	Faith Hill
5.	"Yuki no Hana"	Satomi; Matsumoto	Mika Nakashima
6.	"Time After Time"	Cyndi Lauper; Rob Hyman	Cyndi Lauper
7.	"You've Got a Friend"	Carole King	Carole King
8.	"Hanamizuki"	Hitoto	Yo Hitoto
9.	"Everything"	Misia; Matsumoto	Misia
10.	"Eternal Flame"	Susanna Hoffs; Tom Kelly; Billy Steinberg	The Bangles
11.	"Love Love Love (English Version)"	Yoshida; Nakamura	Dreams Come True

Mr. Vocalist (Korean Version)
No.	Title	Writer(s)	Original artist	Length
1.	"Hero"	Carey; Afanasieff	Mariah Carey
2.	"No One"	Keys; Brothers Jr.; Harry	Alicia Keys
3.	"Time After Time"	Lauper; Hyman	Cyndi Lauper
4.	"There You'll Be"	Warren	Faith Hill
5.	"Superstar"	Leon Russell; Bonnie Bramlett	The Carpenters
6.	"Eternal Flame"	Hoffs; Kelly; Steinberg	The Bangles
7.	"You've Got a Friend"	King	Carole King
8.	"Yuki no Hana"	Satomi; Matsumoto	Mika Nakashima
9.	"Everything"	Misia; Matsumoto	Misia
10.	"Anata no Kiss wo Kazoemashō (You Were Mine)"	Takayanagi; Nakazaki	Yuki Koyanagi
11.	"Love Love Love (English Version)"	Yoshida; Nakamura	Dreams Come True

== Charts ==
Chart (2008)	Peak position
Japanese Albums (Oricon)	12

== See also ==
- Ms. Vocalist - a 2010 cover album by Debbie Gibson, featuring male-oriented J-pop songs.
