= Hanamizuki (song) =

2004 song by Yō Hitoto

"Hanamizuki" (ハナミズキ, Dogwood) is the fifth single by Yo Hitoto. It was released on February 2, 2004. It is a song promoting pacifism inspired by the September 11 attacks. It is one of the most popular songs on karaoke and also Yo Hitoto's most iconic song.

== Track listing ==
All lyrics were written by Yo Hitoto and the arrangement was by Satoshi Takebe.

1. 'Hanamizuki' (ハナミズキ, Dogwood)
2. 'Nennensaisai' (年年歳歳, Year after Year)
3. 'Hanamizuki (instrumental)'

== Charts ==
Chart	Peak position
Oricon	4

In Japan, the song was the second sung in Heisei Period. (from JOYSOUND)

== Cover versions ==
- Eric Martin covered the song in English on his 2008 album Mr. Vocalist.
- Hayley Westenra covered the song in English and titled it "Dogwood Flower"
- Yui Aragaki covered the song for the Japanese film "Hanamizuki"
- Robbie Dupree covered the song in English on the various artists album "E35-II Let's Sing J-Pop in English"
