= Mr. Vocalist 3 =

Studio album by Eric Martin
- Released: November 3, 2010 (Japan)
- Recorded: 2010
- Genre: Pop rock; standards
- Length: 59:39
- Label: Sony Music Japan
- Producer: Eric Martin

Eric Martin chronology
Love Is Alive: Works of 1985–2010 (2010)	Mr. Vocalist 3 (2010)	Mr. Vocalist Best (2011)

Mr. Vocalist 3 is the ninth studio album by American singer-songwriter Eric Martin. Released on November 3, 2010 exclusively in Japan by Sony Music Japan, the album features more of Martin's English-language covers of popular female-oriented Japanese songs. It includes "Sekaijū no Dare Yori Kitto", a duet with Debbie Gibson; an alternate recording of the song is included in Gibson's 2010 cover album Ms. Vocalist.

The album peaked at No. 51 on Oricon's albums chart.

== Track listing ==
No.	Title	Writer(s)	Original artist	Length
1.	"First Love"	Hikaru Utada	Hikaru Utada	4:17
2.	"Mikazuki" ((三日月, "Crescent Moon"))	Ayaka Iida; Yoshihiko Nishio	Ayaka	4:38
3.	"Sekaijū no Dare Yori Kitto (Mr. Vocalist Version) (with Debbie Gibson)" ((世界中の誰よりきっと (MRV ver.), "Surely More Than Anyone in the World (MRV ver.)"))	Show Wesugi; Miho Nakayama; Tetsurō Oda	Miho Nakayama & Wands	4:56
4.	"Mata Kimi ni Koishiteru (with Emiri Miyamoto)" ((また君に恋してる, "I'm in Love with You Again"))	Gorō Matsui; Masaaki Mori	Fuyumi Sakamoto	4:33
5.	"Change"	Miho Fukuhara; 2 Soul	Miho Fukuhara	3:59
6.	"Taiyō no Uta" ((タイヨウのうた, "Sun Song"))	Maika Shiratori	Kaoru Amane	4:48
7.	"Story"	Ai Uemura; 2 Soul	Ai	4:44
8.	"Tsuki no Shizuku" ((月のしずく, "Droplets of the Moon"))	Satomi; Ryōki Matsumoto	Rui	4:22
9.	"Aitai" ((会いたい, "I Want to Meet You"))	Chihiro Sawa; Kazuo Zaitsu	Chikako Sawada	4:40
10.	"Chijō no Hoshi" ((地上の星, "Earthly Stars"))	Miyuki Nakajima	Miyuki Nakajima	4:27
11.	"Nada Sōsō" ((涙そうそう, "Great Tears Are Spilling"))	Ryoko Moriyama; Begin	Rimi Natsukawa	4:17
12.	"Can't Take My Eyes Off You" (Bonus Track)	Bob Crewe; Bob Gaudio	Various	3:58
Total length:				59:39

== Charts ==
Chart (2010)	Peak position
Japanese Albums (Oricon)	51
