= Mr. Vocalist 2 =

Studio album by Eric Martin
- Released: March 4, 2009 (Japan); September 23, 2009 (International)
- Recorded: 2008
- Genre: Pop rock; standards
- Length: 49:32
- Label: Sony Music Japan
- Producer: Eric Martin

Eric Martin chronology
| Mr. Vocalist (2008) | Mr. Vocalist 2 (2009) | Mr. Vocalist X'Mas (2009) |

Mr. Vocalist 2 is the seventh studio album by American singer-songwriter Eric Martin. Released on March 4, 2009, exclusively in Japan by Sony Music Japan, the album features Martin's covers of female-oriented western songs, as voted by fans on a RecoChoku poll.

The album peaked at No. 25 on Oricon's albums chart.

Mr. Vocalist 2 was released internationally as Timeless on September 23, 2009, as an Amazon.com exclusive. This release includes two Christmas songs as bonus tracks.

== Track listing ==
| No. | Title | Writer(s) | Original artist | Length |
|---|---|---|---|---|
| 1. | "Hero" | Mariah Carey; Walter Afanasieff | Mariah Carey | 4:23 |
| 2. | "No One" | Alicia Keys; Kerry Brothers Jr.; George M. Harry | Alicia Keys | 4:20 |
| 3. | "Time After Time" | Cyndi Lauper; Rob Hyman | Cyndi Lauper | 4:20 |
| 4. | "My Heart Will Go On" | James Horner; Will Jennings | Celine Dion | 4:37 |
| 5. | "There You'll Be" | Diane Warren | Faith Hill | 3:41 |
| 6. | "Beautiful" | Linda Perry | Christina Aguilera | 4:07 |
| 7. | "Superstar" | Leon Russell; Bonnie Bramlett | The Carpenters | 4:00 |
| 8. | "Eternal Flame" | Susanna Hoffs; Tom Kelly; Billy Steinberg | The Bangles | 3:57 |
| 9. | "I Will Always Love You" | Dolly Parton | Whitney Houston | 3:08 |
| 10. | "Un-Break My Heart" | Warren | Toni Braxton | 4:37 |
| 11. | "You've Got a Friend" | Carole King | Carole King | 5:30 |
| 12. | "Amazing Grace" | John Newton | Various | 2:53 |
| Total length: | | | | 49:32 |

Timeless bonus tracks
| No. | Title | Writer(s) | Original artist | Length |
|---|---|---|---|---|
| 13. | "Happy Xmas (War Is Over)" | John Lennon; Yoko Ono | John & Yoko/Plastic Ono Band | 4:44 |
| 14. | "White Christmas" | Irving Berlin | Bing Crosby | 3:58 |

== Charts ==
| Chart (2009) | Peak position |
|---|---|
| Japanese Albums (Oricon) | 25 |
