= Mr. Rock Vocalist =

Studio album by Eric Martin
- Released: October 10, 2012
- Genre: Hard rock
- Length: 56:04
- Label: Sony Music Japan
- Producer: Eric Martin; Tom Size; Marti Frederiksen

Eric Martin chronology
Mr. Vocalist Best (2011)	Mr. Rock Vocalist (2012)

Mr. Rock Vocalist is the tenth studio album by American singer-songwriter Eric Martin, released on October 10, 2012, exclusively in Japan by Sony Music Japan. The album features English-language covers of songs by Japanese hard rock bands (as opposed to female-oriented Japanese ballads like the previous Mr. Vocalist albums), as well as two original songs featured in the pachinko game CR Virtua Fighter Revolution. It is the final album in the Mr. Vocalist series.

The album peaked at No. 40 on the Oricon Albums Chart.

== Track listing ==
No.	Title	Writer(s)	Original artist	Length
1.	"Dreamin'" (featuring Steve Stevens)	Tomoyasu Hotei; Gorō Matsui	Boøwy	4:04
2.	"Yuuwaku (誘惑, "Temptation")"	Takuro	Glay	4:18
3.	"1/3 no Junjō na Kanjō (1/3の純情な感情, "1/3 Pure Heart Emotion")"	Siam Shade	Siam Shade	3:45
4.	"Alone" (featuring Stevie Salas)	Koshi Inaba; Tak Matsumoto	B'z	6:05
5.	"Angel"	Kyosuke Himuro	Kyosuke Himuro	3:51
6.	"Rakuen (楽園, "Paradise")" (featuring Richie Kotzen)	Kazuya Yoshii	The Yellow Monkey	4:41
7.	"Honey" (featuring John 5)	Hyde	L'Arc-en-Ciel	3:44
8.	"Gloria"	Juichi Morishige	Ziggy	4:11
9.	"I for You" (featuring Marty Friedman)	Luna Sea	Luna Sea	5:14
10.	"Forever Love"	Yoshiki	X Japan	8:37
11.	"Break Out" (bonus track)	Eric Martin; Andre Pessis; Neal Schon		3:53
12.	"The Heart of a Champion" (bonus track)	Martin; Pessis; Schon		3:47
Total length:				56:04

== Charts ==
Chart (2012)	Peak position
Japanese Albums (Oricon)	40
