= Tsukitenshin =

Tsukitenshin 月天心

Studio album by Yo Hitoto
- Released: December 18, 2002
- Genre: J-pop
- Label: Columbia Music Entertainment
- Producer: Takebe Satoshi 武部聡志

Yo Hitoto chronology
Tsukitenshin 月天心 (2002)	Hitoomoi 一青想 (2004)

Tsukitenshin 月天心 is Yo Hitoto's (一青窈) first studio album. It peaked at number 4 on the Oricon Albums Chart and stayed on the chart for 87 weeks.

== Track listing ==
1. "あこるでぃおん" (akorudion) Accordion
2. "もらい泣き" (morainaki) Sympathy Tears
3. "Sunny Side Up"
4. "イマドコ" (ima doko) Where Are You Now?
5. "犬" (inu) Dog
6. "月天心" (tsukitenshin) Moon in the Center of the Sky
7. "ジャングルジム" (jangurujimu) Jungle Gym
8. "心変わり" (kokoro gawari) Change of Heart
9. "アリガ十々" (arigatou) Thank You
10. "望春風" (Wangchunfeng - Chinese) (Boushunfuu - Japanese)
