= Mr. Vocalist X'Mas =

Studio album by Eric Martin
- Released: November 11, 2009 (Japan)
- Recorded: 2009
- Genre: Pop rock; Christmas
- Label: Sony Music Japan
- Producer: Eric Martin

Eric Martin chronology
Mr. Vocalist 2 (2008)	Mr. Vocalist X'Mas (2009)	Love Is Alive: Works of 1985–2010 (2010)

Mr. Vocalist X'Mas is the eighth studio album by American singer-songwriter Eric Martin. Released on November 11, 2009 exclusively in Japan by Sony Music Japan, the album features Martin's covers of Japanese and western Christmas songs.

The album peaked at No. 26 on Oricon's albums chart.

== Track listing ==
No.	Title	Writer(s)	Original artist	Length
1.	"Christmas Eve" (Kurisumasu Ibu (クリスマス・イブ))	Tatsuro Yamashita; Alan O’Day	Tatsuro Yamashita
2.	"Winter Song"	Miwa Yoshida; Mike Pela; Masato Nakamura	Dreams Come True
3.	"Itsuka no Merry Christmas" (Itsuka no Merī Kurisumasu (いつかのメリークリスマス, "Merry Christmas Someday"))	Tak Matsumoto	B'z
4.	"Christmas Carol no Koro ni wa" (Kurisumasu Kyaroru no Koro ni wa (クリスマスキャロルの頃には, "When the Christmas Carols Play"))	Yasushi Akimoto; Makoto Mitsui	Junichi Inagaki
5.	"Shiroi Koibitotachi" ((白い恋人達, "White Lovers"))	Keisuke Kuwata	Keisuke Kuwata
6.	"Silent Eve" (Sairento Ivu (サイレント・イヴ))	Midori Karashima	Midori Karashima
7.	"Merry Christmas Mr. Lawrence"	Ryuichi Sakamoto	Ryuichi Sakamoto
8.	"All I Want for Christmas Is You" (Koibitotachi no Kurisumasu (恋人たちのクリスマス))	Mariah Carey; Walter Afanasieff	Mariah Carey
9.	"Happy Xmas (War Is Over)"	John Lennon; Yoko Ono	John & Yoko/Plastic Ono Band
10.	"Last Christmas"	George Michael	Wham!
11.	"Do They Know It's Christmas?"	Bob Geldof; Midge Ure	Band Aid
12.	"White Christmas"	Irving Berlin	Bing Crosby

== Charts ==
Chart (2009)	Peak position
Japanese Albums (Oricon)	26
