= Big Trouble (Big Trouble album) =

Studio album by Big Trouble
- Released: 1987
- Genres: Pop, rock
- Length: 35:45
- Label: Epic
- Producers: Giorgio Moroder, Brian Reeves, Ken Rose, Richie Zito, Terry Wilson, Tom Whitlock

Big Trouble is the debut and only studio album by the female pop group Big Trouble, released by Epic in 1987.

== Background ==
Like the formation of 60s group The Monkees, Big Trouble was an all female pop group put together by TV executive Fred Silverman. The group consisted of vocalist Bobbie Eakes, bassist Julia Farey, keyboardist Rebecca Ryan and drummer Suzy Zarow. Shortly after their formation, the band signed to Epic Records and recorded an album. The album was released on vinyl and CD in America, the UK and Europe, although it remains out-of-print today.

The album was released to commercial failure, and therefore became the band's only album. The lead single was "Crazy World" which peaked at #71 in America. The second single was "When the Love Is Good" which failed to make any impact, although it did peak at #83 in the UK. As a follow-up to the single, "Crazy World" was released in the UK shortly after, where it peaked at #96.

A music video was created for both singles.

The album was produced by Grammy and Oscar winner Giorgio Moroder with various other producers on certain tracks. "When the Love Is Good" was produced by Moroder and Brian Reeves, "Say Yes" was produced by Moroder, Terry Wilson and Reeves, "Cool Jerk" and "What About You and Me" was produced by Moroder and Richie Zito. "Dangerous" was produced by Moroder, Ken Rose and Reeves, "Trains and Boats and Planes" was produced by Moroder and Reeves, "I Like It" was produced by Moroder, Whitlock and Wilson, while "Lipstick" was produced by Moroder and Reeves.

The majority of the tracks featured co-writing credits between the various producers, with Moroder co-writing the album's two singles along with Whitlock.

The album contains a cover of the track "Trains and Boats and Planes", originally released as a hit single in 1965 by American pianist Burt Bacharach, as well as a cover of the 1966 track "Cool Jerk" by The Capitols.

On the duet track "What About You and Me", guest vocals were provided by singer, musician and songwriter Eric Martin.

On the album, the song "One More Arrow" was later recorded in 1989 by Renaissance vocalist Annie Haslam for her self-titled third solo album.

The album was recorded at Oasis Recording Studios, North Hollywood, California. It was mastered at Bernie Grundman Mastering, Hollywood, California.

The album's artwork is exactly the same as the band's 1987 debut single "Crazy World", with the only difference being the addition of the "Crazy World" title on the single.

== Critical reception ==
In the New Straits Times issue of March 6, 1988, a review of the album was published. The author Saw Tek Meng wrote: "Big Trouble is part of a music tradition - manufactured all-female groups. This time around, the mastermind is Fred Silverman, one of the most influential men in television in the Seventies and Eighties. After an open audition of some 500 hopefuls, four girls were picked and teamed up with composer-producer Giorgio Moroder. As with such commercial ventures, the accent in their debut set is on catcy, upbeat tunes that have been demographically tested out to appear to as wide a spectrum of listeners as possible. The good news is that Big Trouble don't disgrace themselves or their mentors. Lead singer Bobbie Eakes has not let her Miss Georgia 1983 title get in the way of her vocal abilities and keyboardist Rebecca Ryan, bassist Julia Farey and drummer Suzy Zarow show enough chops on tracks like "When the Love Is Good," "Crazy World" and two oldies, "Cool Jerk" and Dionne Warwick's "Trains and Boats and Planes," to indicate they should survive longer than the average female band. Then again, where are the Go-Gos and Bangles today?"

== Track listing ==
No.	Title	Writer(s)	Length
1.	"When the Love Is Good"	Giorgio Moroder; Tom Whitlock	3:39
2.	"Say Yes"	David Darling; Brian Reeves; Terry Wilson	3:33
3.	"One More Arrow"	Jay Gruska; Val Hoebel	3:49
4.	"Cool Jerk"	Donald Storball	3:47
5.	"What About You and Me (featuring Eric Martin)"	David Darling; Brian Reeves; Scott Cutler	3:54
6.	"Dangerous"	Brian Reeves; Ken Rose; Tom Whitlock	3:33
7.	"Crazy World"	Giorgio Moroder; Tom Whitlock	3:17
8.	"Trains and Boats and Planes"	Burt Bacharach; Hal David	3:51
9.	"I Like It"	Tom Whitlock; Terry Wilson	3:07
10.	"Lipstick"	David Darling; Brian Reeves	3:15
Total length:			35:45

== Singles ==
Crazy World

Chart (1987–88)	Peak position
UK Album Chart	96
U.S. Billboard Hot 100	71

When the Love Is Good

Chart (1988)	Peak position
UK Album Chart	83

== Personnel ==
- Lead vocals, background vocals – Bobbie Eakes
- Bass guitar, background vocals – Julia Farey
- Keyboards, background vocals – Rebecca Ryan
- Drums, keyboards, background vocals – Suzy Zarow

=== Additional personnel ===
- Saxophone – David L. Woodford
- Synthesizer – Arthur Barrow, Brian Reeves, Gary Chang, Terry Wilson
- Keyboards – Jay Gruska
- Guitar – Dan Huff, Dave Darling
- Vocals on "What About You and Me" – Eric Martin
- Engineer – Brian Reeves
- Additional engineer – Chris Brosius, Dave Concors, Ross Hogarth, Terry Wilson
- Assistant engineer – Lori Fumar
- Mixer (mix-down) – Brian Reeves, Giorgio Moroder
- Arranger on "One More Arrow" – Jay Gruska
- Producer – Giorgio Moroder
- Producer on "When the Love Is Good" – Giorgio Moroder, Brian Reeves
- Producer on "Say Yes" – Giorgio Moroder, Brian Reeves, Terry Wilson
- Producer on "Cool Jerk" – Giorgio Moroder, Richie Zito
- Producer on "What About You and Me" – Giorgio Moroder, Richie Zito
- Producer on "Dangerous" – Giorgio Moroder, Brian Reeves, Ken Rose
- Producer on "Trains and Boats and Planes" – Giorgio Moroder, Brian Reeves
- Producer on "I Like It" – Giorgio Moroder, Tom Whitlock, Terry Wilson
- Producer on "Lipstick" – Giorgio Moroder, Brian Reeves
- Art Direction – Tony Lane, Nancy Donald
- Design – Tony Lane, Nancy Donald
- Photography – Lara Rossignol
