= Big Trouble (band) =

American female pop group

- Left to right: bassist Julia Farey, keyboardist Rebecca Ryan, vocalist Bobbie Eakes and drummer Suzy Zarow

Background information
- Origin: United States
- Genres: Pop, rock
- Years active: 1985–1988
- Label: Epic

Big Trouble was an American female pop group who recorded one album and released two minor hit singles.

== History ==
Like the formation of 60s group The Monkees, Big Trouble was an all-female pop group put together by TV executive Fred Silverman. The group consisted of vocalist Bobbie Eakes, bassist Julia Farey, keyboardist Rebecca Ryan and drummer Suzy Zarow. Eakes was originally Miss Georgia in 1983.

After deciding on all band members except the vocalist, Silverman auditioned approximately five hundred vocalists, where Eakes was the one to win the part.

The band made their start on the Mack & Jamie comedy show; they would often appear as the "house band" on the series Comedy Break, and Eakes would occasionally appear as a performer in the sketches.

The band signed to Epic Records in 1987, and recorded their first single - a Giorgio Moroder and Tom Whitlock track titled "All I Need Is You". It was released as a promotional single, and featured in the film Over the Top, starring Sylvester Stallone. The song was included on the official soundtrack release, which was released during the same year.

The band then recorded their self-titled album Big Trouble which was released in 1987. The album was produced by Grammy and Oscar winner Giorgio Moroder, while various other producers featured on certain tracks alongside him. Moroder co-wrote both album tracks that were released as singles. Today, the album, although on CD and vinyl, has remained out-of-print.

Big Trouble had one chart entry in the U.S., the single "Crazy World", released in 1987. The song, written by Moroder and Whitlock, peaked at No. 71. A music video was filmed for the song.

A second single followed in 1988, the Moroder-Whitlock song "When the Love Is Good", which was also taken from the self-titled album, and featured the non-album b-side "Last Kiss". The song failed to make any impact in the States, although it peaked at No. 83 in the UK. A music video was filmed for the song. The band's final release was the 1988 CD maxi-single "Crazy World", released in the UK only, which was backed by the two album tracks "Say Yes" and "Trains and Boats and Planes". The release attempted to follow the minor success of the previous single, where it peaked at No. 96. As a result of the small success, the group dissolved soon after.

Following the band's split, Eakes, previously an actress, would win the role of Macy Alexander on the soap opera The Bold and the Beautiful, which she played from 1989 to 2000. She returned to music in 1994 with a duet album with Jeff Tracta, titled Bold and Beautiful Duets, which went double-platinum in Europe. Another collaboration with Tracta followed in 1998, with the album Glamour Duets II. Two solo albums followed, the 1998 album Here and Now, as well as the 2005 album Something Beautiful.

Bassist Julia Farey would later replace the bassist of another all-female rock band Precious Metal. With that band, she would record their third and final album Precious Metal, released in 1990. In an interview with two members Mara Fox and Leslie Knauer, it was stated that Farey was found by the band the same way they had started the band, through musicians wanted ads in the local papers.

Both the keyboardist Rebecca Ryan and drummer Suzy Zarow disappeared from the public eye after the band's split. Ryan eventually became a solo artist during the 90s and recorded two albums at the turn of the 21st century, mainly focusing on jazz and pop standards.

Former guitarist Heli Sterner was later an inaugural member of another outfit, Rachel Rachel, which became the first all-female group in the history of the contemporary Christian music genre. Rachel Rachel is also defunct.

== Members ==
Final lineup

- Bobbie Eakes - lead and backing vocals (1986-1988)
- Julia Farey - bass guitar, backing vocals (1985-1988)
- Rebecca Ryan - keyboards, keytar, piano, backing and lead vocals (1985-1988)
- Suzy Zarow - drums, backing vocals (1985-1988)

Past members

- Bess Motta - lead and backing vocals (1985-1986)
- Heli Sterner - guitar, backing and lead vocals (1985-1986)
- Cece Worrall - saxophone, flute, tambourine, backing vocals (1985-1986)

== Discography ==
Studio albums

- Big Trouble (1987)

Singles

- "All I Need Is You" (promotional single only) (1987)
- "Crazy World" (1987)
- "When the Love Is Good" (1988)
- "Crazy World" (UK CD issue) (1988)
