= Tae Hitoto =

Japanese actress (born 1970)

Tae Hitoto (一青 妙, Hitoto Tae; born September 24, 1970 in Taipei, Taiwan; born Yan Miao (顏妙)) is a Japanese actress, dentist and author. Her mother was Japanese, and her father was a Taiwanese businessman Gan Hui Bin（顏惠民）. She graduated from Showa University with a degree in Dentistry. Yō Hitoto is her younger sister.

Hitoto published her first non-fiction book, Box My Child, about her father in 2012. She subsequently wrote a second non-fiction book and four travel books, also about Taiwan. Hitoto's first novel, The Blue Flower, continued her literary career's focus on Taiwan. Although written in Japanese, a Chinese translation of the novel was published in Taiwan in 2025 before a Japanese edition was released.
