= Bobbie Eakes =

American actress and singer

- Born: July 25, 1961 (age 65); Georgia, USA
- Other names: Bobbi Eakes; Bobbie Steen
- Occupations: Actress; singer
- Years active: 1986–present
- Known for: Her role as Macy Alexander on The Bold and the Beautiful and Krystal Carey on All My Children (2003–2011).
- Spouse: David Steen (m. 1992)
- Website: bobbieakes.com

Bobbie Eakes
- Genres: Country; pop; pop rock
- Instrument: Vocals
- Years active: 1986–2005, 2012
- Labels: Epic; Arcade; CNR Music; Brentwood
- Formerly of: Big Trouble

Bobbie Eakes (born July 25, 1961) is an American actress and singer. She is known for her role as Macy Alexander on The Bold and the Beautiful (1989–2000, 2001, 2002–2003) and for her role as Krystal Carey on All My Children (2003–2011).

== Biography ==
=== Personal life ===
She is the youngest of five daughters in an Air Force family.

Eakes was Miss Georgia 1982, placing among the top 10 at Miss America 1983. She studied at the University of Georgia. In 1992 she married novelist and actor David Steen on July 4.

=== Career ===
Eakes received bit roles on nighttime television series, such as Cheers, before becoming successful in the soap opera genre. In the mid-1980s, she was the lead singer of the dance-pop rock group Big Trouble. The group released one self-titled CD in 1987, which was produced by Giorgio Moroder. Their single "Crazy World" charted on the U.S. singles chart, reaching No. 71. As a result, Big Trouble became short-lived one-hit wonders.

She first achieved fame in the role of Macy Alexander on the soap opera The Bold and the Beautiful, which she played from 1989 to 2000 (on contract), 2001 (guest appearance) and 2002 to 2003 (on contract). While outwardly a "good girl" character, Macy battled with alcoholism before finally finding happiness with Deacon Sharpe (played by Sean Kanan). On the show, Macy was an accomplished singer in her own right (in tune with Eakes' hobby).

Between stints as Macy, Eakes hosted shows on the country music television channel Great American Country. She was also featured on country music singer Collin Raye's 2000 single "Tired of Loving This Way", which peaked at No. 50 on the Billboard Hot Country Singles & Tracks (now Hot Country Songs) charts.

On July 7, 2000, her character "died" in a fiery explosion when her car crashed into a gasoline truck when the writers of the show felt the character of Macy no longer contributed to the show's storyline. She was brought back to the show during the B&B location shoot at Portofino, Italy in December 2002, and was then killed off after a chandelier fell on her during a concert in 2003. The decision was made to kill Macy off a second time after Eakes had decided to take the role of Krystal Carey on All My Children, as the complete opposite of Macy, playing the sexy and sassy character. The role of Krystal is loosely based on Eakes' Southern upbringing.

Eakes also starred in productions of Cinderella and Love Letters opposite her former costar Jeff Trachta in Los Angeles. The two have still been friends offscreen. The CD they recorded together, Bold and Beautiful Duets, went double-platinum in Europe.

With All My Children airing its final episode on ABC in September 2011, earlier in June it was highly rumored that Eakes would be returning to The Bold and the Beautiful. She also starred as Katherine "Kitty" on The Grove: The Series created by Crystal Chappell and in 12 episodes of Tainted Dreams. Both were released exclusively online.

Eakes’ close family-friend Bobby Hall is expected to appear on the 52nd season of Survivor in early 2027.

== Filmography ==
Television
Year	Film	Role	Notes
1986	Matlock	Joanne Leigh	1 episode – as Bobbi Eakes
1987	Jake and the Fatman	April Blue	1 episode
1987	Falcon Crest	Dating Girl	1 episode
1987	Werewolf	Margaret	1 episode
1988	Cheers	Laurie Drake	1 episode (season 6, episode 15: Tale of Two Cuties)
1989	The Wonder Years	Bookstore Clerk	2 episodes
1989	Full House	Diane	1 episode
1989	21 Jump Street	Bobbie	1 episode
1989–2000; 2001–2003	The Bold and the Beautiful	Macy Alexander	Role from: April 27, 1989 – July 30, 2000; August 1–2, 2001; December 2002 – October 2003
1995	Land's End	Stephanie Wade	1 episode
2001	Doc	Molly Campbell	1 episode
2001	JAG	Annabel Hart	1 episode
2001	Days of Our Lives	Marchioness of La Cienega	1 episode
2003–2011	All My Children	Krystal Carey	December 9, 2003 – September 23, 2011
2004–2005	One Life to Live	Krystal Carey	November 12–19, 2004; February 17–21, 2005
2004	Hope & Faith	Herself	2 episodes
2004	The Division	Ms. Emberly	1 episode
2008	Sordid Lives: The Series	Daniella	2 episodes
2011	Who Is Billie Mackenzie?	Mrs. Mackenzie	1 episode
2012	Fumbling Thru the Pieces	Crystal	3 episodes
2022	P-Valley	Delta	1 episode
2022	George & Tammy	Nan Smith	2 episodes
Film
Year	Title	Role	Notes
1994	A Gift from Heaven	Unknown	
2001	Choosing Matthias	Kay	
2003	Charlie's War	Caroline Lewis	
2011	A Christmas Wedding Tale	Hillary	TV movie
2013	Sunny and RayRay	Abilene	
2013	Southern Baptist Sissies	Mark's mother	
2015	The Diamond in the Desert	Newscaster	Short
2017	Distortion	Pam Walters	
2020	The Bellmen	Catherine	
2020	The Crickets Dance	Janice	
2022	A Christmas Open House	Janice	
2024	Our Little Secret	Cheryl	
Web
Year	Title	Role	Notes
2013	The Grove	Katherine	Pilot
2014–2017	Tainted Dreams	Courtney Parish	12 episodes: January 4, 2014; December 25, 2016; December 28, 2017

== Discography ==
=== Albums ===
Title	Album details
Big Trouble (with Big Trouble)	Release date: 1988; Label: Epic
Bold and Beautiful Duets (with Jeff Trachta)	Release date: 1994; Label: Arcade
Duets II (with Jeff Trachta)	Release date: 1995; Label: Arcade
Here and Now	Release date: 1998; Label: CNR Music
Something Beautiful	Release date: April 26, 2005; Label: Brentwood Records

=== Guest singles ===
Year	Single	Artist	Peak chart positions		Album
Year	Single	Artist	US Country	CAN Country	Album
2000	"Tired of Loving This Way"	Collin Raye	50	76	Tracks

=== Music videos ===
Year	Video	Director
2000	"Loving This Way" (with Collin Raye)	Jon Small

== Awards and nominations ==
List of acting awards and nominations
Year	Award	Category	Title	Result	Ref.
1992	Soap Opera Digest Award	Best Love Story: Daytime or Prime Time (shared with Jeff Trachta)	The Bold and the Beautiful	Nominated	
1994	Soap Opera Digest Award	Outstanding Supporting Actress	The Bold and the Beautiful	Nominated	refcn
1999	Soap Opera Digest Award	Outstanding Supporting Actress	The Bold and the Beautiful	Nominated	
2005	Soap Opera Digest Award	Outstanding Supporting Actress	All My Children	Nominated	
2006	Daytime Emmy Award	Outstanding Lead Actress in a Drama Series	All My Children	Nominated	
2010	Daytime Emmy Award	Outstanding Lead Actress in a Drama Series	All My Children	Nominated	

Preceded by Kristl Evans	Miss Georgia; 1982	Succeeded by Tammy Fulwider
