= Love Is Alive: Works of 1985–2010 =

Compilation album by Eric Martin
- Released: September 8, 2010 (Japan)
- Recorded: 1985–2010
- Genre: Hard rock; pop rock; standards
- Label: Sony Music Japan
- Producer: Eric Martin

Eric Martin chronology
| Mr. Vocalist X'Mas (2009) | Love Is Alive: Works of 1985–2010 (2010) | Mr. Vocalist 3 (2010) |

Love Is Alive: Works of 1985–2010 is a compilation album by American singer-songwriter Eric Martin. The album was released on November 8, 2010 exclusively in Japan by Sony Music Japan to commemorate the 25th anniversary of Martin's solo career.

The album peaked at No. 138 on Oricon's albums chart.

== Track listing ==
| No. | Title | Writer(s) | Length |
|---|---|---|---|
| 1. | "Love Is Alive" | Eric Martin; Andre Pessis; Geo |
| 2. | "Fly" | David Baker; Eric Gorfain; Frank Scarpelli |
| 3. | "You're Too Good for Him" | Martin; Pessis |
| 4. | "Bigger Man" (Acoustic Version) | Martin; Pessis |
| 5. | "A Wink and a Smile" | Martin; Pessis |
| 6. | "Eyes of the World" | Neal Schon; Martin; Tony Fanucchi; Kevin Elson |
| 7. | "Everytime I Think of You" | John Cesario; Steve Mark Mullen; Gary Lee Jones |
| 8. | "Everyday" | Martin; G. J. Marquez |
| 9. | "All Cried Out" | Martin; Pessis; Anders Wikstrom; Fredrik Thomander |
| 10. | "Let's Get It Over With" | Martin; Pessis; Wikstrom; Thomander |
| 11. | "Sleepwalking" | Martin; Pessis |
| 12. | "Can't Take My Eyes Off You" (Bonus Track) (Kimi no Hitomi ni Koishiteru (君の瞳に恋してる)) | Bob Crewe; Bob Gaudio |
| 13. | "Tell the Truth" (Bonus Track) | Linda Lavalee; Masahiro Andoh |
| 14. | "To Be with You" (Live) (Bonus Track) | Martin; David Grahame |

== Charts ==
| Chart (2010) | Peak position |
|---|---|
| Japanese Albums (Oricon) | 138 |
