= Open Your Heart =

Open Your Heart may refer to:

== Television ==
- "Open Your Heart" (Super Soul Sunday), a season-two episode of Super Soul Sunday
- Open Your Heart (talk show), a 2016 Algerian reality television talk show airing on Echourouk TV

== Music ==
- Open Your Heart (album), a 2012 album by The Men

=== Songs ===
- "Open Your Heart" (Madonna song), 1986
- "Open Your Heart" (M People song)
- "Open Your Heart" (Europe song), 1984/1988
- "Open Your Heart" (Birgitta song), the Icelandic entry for the Eurovision Song Contest 2003, by Birgitta Haukdal
- "Open Your Heart" (The Human League song), 1981
- "Open Your Heart" (Lavender Diamond song)
- "Open Your Heart" (Crush 40 song), the main theme for the video game Sonic Adventure
- "Open Your Heart", a song by Christopher Cross from Every Turn of the World
- "Open Your Heart", a song by Westlife from Westlife
- "Open Your Heart", a song by CB Milton from the album It's My Loving Thing
- "Open Your Heart", a song from the soundtrack of the anime .hack//Sign
- "Open Your Heart", a song by Anggun from Open Hearts
- "Open Your Heart", a song by Kim Kay
- "Öppna din dörr", 2016 Jill Johnson version in English
