= Crazy World (Big Trouble song) =

Single by Big Trouble

from the album Big Trouble
- B-side: "Lipstick"
- Released: November 14, 1987
- Genre: Pop rock
- Length: 3:16
- Label: Epic Records
- Songwriters: Giorgio Moroder; Tom Whitlock
- Producer: Giorgio Moroder

Big Trouble singles chronology
"All I Need Is You" (1987)	"Crazy World" (1987)	"When the Love Is Good" (1988)

"Crazy World" is a song by American female pop group Big Trouble, which was released in 1987 as the lead single from their only studio album, Big Trouble. It was written by Giorgio Moroder and Tom Whitlock, and produced by Moroder.

"Crazy World" peaked at No. 71 on the US Billboard Hot 100. A re-issue in the UK in 1988 saw the song reach No. 96 on the UK Singles Chart.

== Promotion ==
A music video was filmed to promote the single, which features the band performing the song inside a garage. It was directed by Tony Vanden-Ende and produced by Colleen McLean.

== Critical reception ==
On its release, Billboard listed the single under "new and noteworthy" and commented: "On this synth-rock release, the group draws on the various musical upbringings from which it has emerged; single's Berlin meets ZZ Top stance has great pop potential." In a review of Big Trouble, Saw Tek Meng of the New Straits Times commented: "Big Trouble show enough chops on tracks like "When the Love is Good" [and] "Crazy World" to indicate they should survive longer than the average female band."

In the UK, Lesley O'Toole of Record Mirror considered "Crazy World" to be "not at all what assembled cynics might expect of an all-girl Californian combo" and felt Big Trouble were like a female version of Bon Jovi. She wrote, "Bobbie Eakes belts this out as if there's no tomorrow, drawing more from the Maria McKee school of raunchy vocals than the butter-wouldn't-melt-in-their-mouths Tiffany-type contingent."

== Track listing ==
7" single (American Release)

1. "Crazy World" - 3:16
2. "Lipstick" - 3:16

7" single (American Promo)

1. "Crazy World" - 3:17
2. "Crazy World" - 3:17

12 single (UK Release)

1. "Crazy World" - 3:16
2. "Say Yes" - 3:32
3. "Trains and Boats and Planes" - 3:49

CD single (1988 UK Release)

1. "Crazy World" - 3:16
2. "Say Yes" - 3:32
3. "Trains and Boats and Planes" - 3:49

== Personnel ==
Big Trouble

- Bobbie Eakes - lead vocals
- Julia Farey - bass, backing vocals
- Rebecca Ryan - keyboards, backing vocals
- Suzy Zarow - drums, backing vocals

Production

- Giorgio Moroder - producer of "Crazy World"
- Giorgio Moroder, Brian Reeves - producers of "Lipstick" and "Trains and Boats and Planes"
- Giorgio Moroder, Brian Reeves, Terry Wilson - producers of "Say Yes"

== Charts ==
Chart (1987–88)	Peak position
UK Singles Chart	96
US Billboard Hot 100	71
