= Yo Hitoto =

Japanese-Taiwanese pop singer (born 1976)

Yo Hitoto 一青 窈
- Also known as: 一青窈 (Hitoto Yō)
- Born: 顏窈 (Yan Yao); September 20, 1976 (age 49)
- Genres: Pop
- Occupation: singer
- Instruments: Vocals, piano
- Years active: 2002–present
- Labels: Nippon Columbia; For Life; EMI
- Website: http://www.hitotoyo.jp/

Yo Hitoto (一青 窈, Hitoto Yō; born September 20, 1976) is a Japanese-Taiwanese pop singer.

== Early life ==
Yo Hitoto's mother was Japanese, and her father was a Taiwanese businessman Gan Hui Bin (顏惠民). Tae Hitoto is her older sister.

Her father died when she was very young, and her mother died when she was 16. Soon after she was born in Tokyo, Hitoto moved to Taipei, and after she completed kindergarten in Taipei, she moved back to Tokyo and she has lived there ever since. Hitoto is her mother's maiden name, which she changed to when she moved back to Japan.

She can speak four languages: Japanese, English, Mandarin, and Taiwanese.

== Career ==
To date, Hitoto has released eleven single CDs and four albums.

She graduated from the department of Environmental Information of Keio University and participated in the Keio University a cappella group, K.O.E., during her days as a student. She used to have live concerts on the street with fellow K.O.E. members before she met Yōichi Kitayama, a member of the famous Japanese a cappella group the Gospellers. Kitayama encouraged Hitoto to compose her own music. Before this encounter, she had been a backup singer for many other artists.

Hitoto's debut single "Morai naki" propelled her to stardom, and her songs enjoy wide popularity. Her clear voice and singing style, which is compared to the style of folk songs of Okinawa, attract many fans. Her subsequent single Hanamizuki, released in 2004, was also a hit. The song was inspired by the events of the September 11 attacks in the United States.

In Taiwan she is known for singing a Taiwanese folk song (Bāng Chhun-hong), which was included in her second album, as part of a Kirin beer commercial aired in Taiwan.

Hitoto performed the theme song for the game Dynasty Warriors 3.

Her latest compilation album sold over 700,000 copies (Triple-Platinum status in Japan), becoming her best selling album yet.

On March 11, 2022, Hitoto participated in the Shuichi "Ponta" Murakami tribute concert "One Last Live", performing "Fever" and "Hana Mizuki". She also joined Mie in performing the Pink Lady hit single "Pepper Keibu".

=== Film career ===
In 2003 Hitoto debuted in her first film Café Lumière, as the lead character Yoko.

== Discography ==
=== Albums ===
- 月天心 Tsukitenshin (December 18, 2002)
- 一青想 Hito-Omoi (April 7, 2004)
- ＆ (December 21, 2005)
- Bestyo (November 29, 2006)
- Key (March 5, 2008)
- Karengai '花蓮街' Hualien City (April 21, 2010)
- Hitotoiro '一青十色; Hitoto Color' (June 27, 2012)
- Watashi Juusou '私重奏; I Instrumental Ensemble' (Oct 22, 2014)

=== Singles ===
- もらい泣き Morai-Naki (October 30, 2002)
- 大家 Dajia (March 19, 2003)
- 金魚すくい Kingyo Sukui (July 4, 2003)
- 江戸ポルカ／夢なかば Edo Polka/Yume Nakaba (November 12, 2003)
- ハナミズキ Hanamizuki (February 11, 2004), NTV Tuesday Suspense Drama, JRA commercial song
- 影踏み Kagefumi (April 20, 2005), JRA commercial song
- かざぐるま Kazaguruma (September 21, 2005)
- 指切り Yubikiri (December 7, 2005)
- つないで手 Tsunaide Te (September 19, 2007)
- 「ただいま」 Tadaima (December 5, 2007)
- 受け入れて Uke-Irete (January 30, 2008)
- はじめて Hajimete (November 19, 2008), the theme song for "Gyōretsu no Dekiru Hōritsu Sōdanjo Cambodia Gakkō Kensetsu Project" (Nippon Television Network Corp.)
- ユア メディスン～私があなたの薬になってあげる; I'll Become Your Medicine (October 7, 2009)
- うんと幸せ; Lots Of Happiness (November 4, 2009)
- 冬めく / 花のあと; Wintry / Remains Of A Flower (February 24, 2010)
- dots and lines / とめる(May 23, 2012)
- 道案内 / 愛と誠のファンタアジア (June 6, 2012)
- 蛍; Firefly (March 26, 2014)

=== Videos ===
- 姿見一青也 Sugatami Hitotonari (October 1, 2003)
- 一青窈 LIVE TOUR 2004 ～てとしゃん Hitoto You LIVE TOUR 2004 ~Tetoshan (April 11, 2004)
- 一青窈★夢街バンスキング～はいらんせ～ Hitoto You ★ Yumemachi Vanceking ~Hairanse~ (February 1, 2006)
- Yo&U TOUR '06 (September 6, 2006)

== Filmography ==
=== Films ===
- Café Lumière (2004), Yoko

=== Television ===
- Rosanjin's Stove (2026), Yoshiko Yamaguchi

| Preceded by Mika Nakashima | Japan Record Award for Best New Artist; 2003 | Succeeded by Ai Otsuka |
