= List of best-selling singles in Japan =

In 2007, Japan had the second largest music market in the world. In 1962, Tokushin music reports was founded and became the leading provider of music sales in Japan. However their reports and charts are only available to industry insiders and are not available to the general public. In 1968 Original Confidence was established and began providing music charts to the general public with data collected from various retailers throughout Japan.

This is the list of the best-selling singles, based on the data by Oricon. It does not include singles that were released before 1968, and is only from data collected from Oricon's retail partners and not the record companies.

== Best-selling physical singles in Japan ==
Guinness World Records certified that Masato Shimon's "Oyoge! Taiyaki-kun" is the best-selling single in Japan.

There were several singles which achieved worldwide success. Kyu Sakamoto's "Sukiyaki" sold estimate 13 million copies over worldwide. However, those were worldwide sales.

There were many non full-track digital download singles in Japan. Hikaru Utada's "Flavor of Life" sold over 7.7 million combined sales. GReeeeN's "Ai Uta" sold 5 million digital download singles. However, those included the sales of non full-track digital download singles. Guinness World Records certified that Thelma Aoyama's "Soba ni Iru ne" is the best-selling full-track digital download single in Japan with over 8 million copies.

Machiko Soga's "Oba-Q Ondo" sold estimate 2 million single and 4 million sonosheet in Japan. However, a sonosheet was not a regular 7-inch single.

Yujiro Ishihara & Shunko Makimura's "Ginza No Koi No Monogatari" (1961) sold estimate 3.35 million copies in Japan. Hiroshi Wada & His Mahina Stars's "Ozashiki Kouta" (1964) sold estimate 3 million copies in Japan. Yūzō Kayama's "Kimi to Itsumademo" (1965) sold estimate 3 million copies in Japan. However, those were released before 1968 in Japan.

=== List of best-selling singles based on physical sales ===
The following list covers the highest-selling singles in the country based on physical sales compiled by Oricon since its foundation in November 1967.

| No. | Single | Artist | Released | Chart | Sales |
|---|---|---|---|---|---|
| 1 | "Oyoge! Taiyaki-kun" | Masato Shimon | 25 December 1975 | 1 | 4,577,000 |
| 2 | "Onna no Michi" | Shiro Miya | 10 May 1972 | 1 | 3,256,000 |
| 3 | "Sekai ni Hitotsu Dake no Hana" | SMAP | 5 March 2003 | 1 | 3,128,000 |
| 4 | "Tsunami" | Southern All Stars | 26 January 2000 | 1 | 2,936,000 |
| 5 | "Dango 3 Kyodai" | Kentarou Hayami, Ayumi Shigemori, Himawari Kids and Dango Gasshoudan | 3 March 1999 | 1 | 2,918,000 |
| 6 | "Kimi ga Iru Dake de" | Kome Kome Club | 4 May 1992 | 1 | 2,895,000 |
| 7 | "Say Yes" | Chage and Aska | 24 July 1991 | 1 | 2,822,000 |
| 8 | "Tomorrow Never Knows" | Mr. Children | 10 November 1994 | 1 | 2,766,000 |
| 9 | "Oh! Yeah!"^{[I]} | Kazumasa Oda | 6 February 1991 | 1 | 2,588,000 |
| 10 | "Love Love Love" | Dreams Come True | 24 July 1995 | 1 | 2,489,000 |
| 11 | "Yah Yah Yah"^{[II]} | Chage and Aska | 3 March 1993 | 1 | 2,419,000 |
| 12 | "Namonaki Uta" | Mr. Children | 5 February 1996 | 1 | 2,309,000 |
| 13 | "Sakura Zaka" | Masaharu Fukuyama | 26 April 2000 | 1 | 2,299,000 |
| 14 | "Can You Celebrate?" | Namie Amuro | 19 February 1997 | 1 | 2,296,000 |
| 15 | "Departures" | Globe | 1 January 1996 | 1 | 2,288,000 |
| 16 | "Kuroneko no Tango" | Osamu Minagawa | 5 October 1969 | 1 | 2,235,000 |
| 17 | "WOW WAR TONIGHT 〜Toki ni wa Okose yo Movement" (WOW WAR TONIGHT 〜時には起こせよムーヴメント) | H Jungle With t | 15 March 1995 | 1 | 2,135,000 |
| 18 | "Koi no Kisetsu" | Pinky & Killers | 20 July 1968 | 1 | 2,077,000 |
| 19 | "Automatic"^{[III]} | Utada Hikaru | 9 December 1998 | 2 | 2,063,000 |
| 20 | "True Love" | Fumiya Fujii | 10 November 1993 | 1 | 2,023,000 |

Notes:

- ^[I] Released along with popular B-side "Love Story wa Totsuzen ni".
- ^[II] Released as a double A-side single along with "Yume no Bannin".
- ^[III] Released as a double A-side single along with "Time Will Tell".

== List of best-selling singles by Western acts ==
The following list covers the top-selling singles released by such acts in Japan, based on physical sales only.

Physical singles
| Single | Artist | Released | Chart | Sales |
|---|---|---|---|---|
| "Beautiful Sunday" | Daniel Boone | 10 March 1976 | 1 | 2,050,000 |
| "To Love You More" | Celine Dion | 21 October 1995 | 1 | 1,500,000^{[I]} |
| "All I Want for Christmas Is You" | Mariah Carey | 29 October 1994 | 2 | 1,100,000 |
| "I Will Always Love You" | Whitney Houston | 2 December 1992 | 1 | 810,060 |
| "The Sound of Silence" | Simon & Garfunkel | 15 June 1968 | 1 | 810,000 |
| "As the Years Go By" | Mashmakhan | 1970 | — | 790,000 |
| "Yes Sir, I Can Boogie" | Baccara | April 1977 | — | 750,000 |
| "The Lovers of the World" (Otoko no Sekai) | Jerry Wallace | 25 July 1970 | 1 | 734,000 |
| "I'm In the Mood for Dancing" | The Nolans | 21 July 1980 | 1 | 700,000 |
| "Flashdance... What a Feeling" | Irene Cara | 25 June 1983 | 1 | 697,000 |
| "Last Christmas" | Wham! | 15 December 1984^{[II]} | 15 | 683,000 |
| "I Dream of Naomi" (Japanese title: "Naomi no Yume") | Hedva and David | 25 January 1971 | 1 | 666,000 |
| "Candle in the Wind 1997" | Elton John | 26 September 1997 | 1 | 632,000 |
| "Yesterday Once More" | The Carpenters | 10 July 1973 | 5 | 592,000 |
| "Sky High" | Jigsaw | 25 October 1975 | 2 | 568,000 |
| "Let It Be" | The Beatles | 25 March 1970 | 6 | 558,000 |
| "Venus" | Shocking Blue | 20 February 1970 | 2 | 555,000 |
| "I Need to Be in Love"^{[III]} | The Carpenters | 3 November 1995 | 5 | 542,000 |
| "Welcome to the Edge" | Billie Hughes | 15 May 1991 | 3 | 518,000 |
| "Massachusetts" | Bee Gees | 25 December 1967 | 1 | 517,000 |
| "Never Marry a Railroad Man" | Shocking Blue | 10 September 1970 | 2 | 505,000 |
| "Y.M.C.A." | Village People | 17 October 1978 | — | 500,000 |

Notes:

- ^[I] According to Sony Music Entertainment Japan, "To Love You More" sold 1.5 million copies in the country.
- ^[II] Originally released in 1984, reissued in 1993.
- ^[III] Released as a double A-side single along with "Top of the World".

=== Digital and multi-format sales ===
| Single | Artist | Released | Chart | Sales |
|---|---|---|---|---|
| "Dragostea din tei" | O-Zone | 2003 | — | 4,350,000 |
| "Girlfriend" | Avril Lavigne | 27 February 2007 | 27 | 1,850,000 |
| "All I Want for Christmas Is You" | Mariah Carey | 29 October 1994 | 2 | 1,000,000 |
| "Call Me Maybe" | Carly Rae Jepsen | 20 September 2011 | 3 | 1,000,000 |
| "We Are Never Ever Getting Back Together" | Taylor Swift | 13 August 2012 | 2 | 1,000,000 |
| "Miles Away" | Madonna | 17 October 2008 | 7 | 750,000 |
| "Poker Face" | Lady Gaga | 23 September 2008 | | 750,000 |
| "Happy" | Pharrell Williams | 21 November 2013 | 5 | 500,000 |
| "Let It Go" | Idina Menzel | January 2014 | 4 | 500,000 |

== Best-selling multi-format singles in Japan ==
With over 9.2 million combined sales, Thelma Aoyama's "Soba ni Iru ne" is the best-selling multi-format single in Japan.

=== Over 5 million copies ===
| Year | Song | Artist | Detailed Sales | | | Total Sales |
| Year | Song | Artist | Physical | Single Track | Chaku-uta | Total Sales |
|---|---|---|---|---|---|---|
| 2008 | "Soba ni Iru ne" | Thelma Aoyama featuring SoulJa | 550,000 | 8,700,000 | | 9,250,000 |
| 2007 | "Flavor of Life" | Hikaru Utada | 651,000 | 8,000,000 | | 8,651,000 |
| 2008 | "Kiseki" | Greeeen | 558,000 | 7,600,000 | | 8,158,000 |
| 2007 | "Lovers Again" | Exile | 260,000 | 7,000,000 | | 7,260,000 |
| 2009 | "Shunkashūtō" | Hilcrhyme | 139,000 | 7,000,000 | | 7,139,000 |
| 2006 | "Junrenka" | Shōnan no Kaze | 523,000 | 6,500,000 | | 7,023,000 |
| 2009 | "Butterfly" | Kaela Kimura | — | 7,000,000 | | 7,000,000 |
| 2007 | "Ai Uta" | Greeeen | 300,000 | 5,900,000 | | 6,200,000 |
| 2011 | "Maru Maru Mori Mori!" | Mana Ashida and Fuku Suzuki as Kaoru to Tomoki, Tamani Mook | 541,000 | 5,000,000 | | 5,541,000 |
| 2007 | "Tsubomi" | Kobukuro | 506,000 | 2,000,000 | 3,000,000 | 5,506,000 |
| 2005 | "Story" | Ai | 276,000 | 2,000,000 | 3,000,000 | 5,276,000 |
| 2009 | "Haruka" | Greeeen | 145,000 | 5,000,000 | | 5,145,000 |
| 2010 | "Aitakute Aitakute" | Kana Nishino | 97,000 | 5,000,000 | | 5,097,000 |

=== Over 4 million copies ===
| Year | Song | Artist | Detailed Sales | | | Total Sales |
| Year | Song | Artist | Physical | Single Track | Chaku-uta | Total Sales |
|---|---|---|---|---|---|---|
| 2008 | "366 Nichi" | HY | — | 4,800,000 | | 4,800,000 |
| 2009 | "Ashita ga Kurunara" | Juju featuring Jay'ed | 150,000 | 4,500,000 | | 4,650,000 |
| 2009 | "Mata Kimi ni Koishiteru" | Fuyumi Sakamoto | 400,000 | 4,000,000 | | 4,400,000 |
| 2007 | "Winding Road" | Ayaka and Kobukuro | 359,000 | 4,000,000 | | 4,359,000 |
| 2003 | "Dragostea din tei" | O-Zone | — | 350,000 | 4,000,000 | 4,350,000 |
| 2006 | "Mata Aimashō" | Seamo | 205,000 | 4,000,000 | | 4,205,000 |

=== Over 3 million copies ===
| Year | Song | Artist | Detailed Sales | | | Total Sales |
| Year | Song | Artist | Physical | Single Track | Chaku-uta | Total Sales |
|---|---|---|---|---|---|---|
| 2005 | "Dreamland" | Bennie K | 500,000 | 3,400,000 | | 3,900,000 |
| 2004 | "Hana" | Orange Range | 1,000,000 | 750,000 | 2,000,000 | 3,750,000 |
| 2005 | "Sakura" | Kobukuro | 500,000 | 1,250,000 | 2,000,000 | 3,750,000 |
| 2011 | "Love Story" | Namie Amuro | 162,000 | 3,500,000 | | 3,662,000 |
| 2018 | "Lemon" | Kenshi Yonezu | 584,030 | 3,000,000 | | 3,584,030 |
| 2008 | "Life" | Kimaguren | 66,000 | 3,500,000 | | 3,566,000 |
| 2009 | "Futatsu no Kuchibiru" (Note: Physical sales from "The Generation: Futatsu no Kuchibiru" maxi single.) | Exile | 289,000 | 1,250,000 | 2,000,000 | 3,539,000 |
| 1992 | "Kimi ga Iru Dake de" (Note: Released as a double A-side single with "Aishiteru".) | Kome Kome Club | 2,895,000 | 500,000 | — | 3,395,000 |
| 2007 | "Gake no Ue no Ponyo" | Fujioka Fujimaki and Nozomi Ōhashi | 382,000 | 3,000,000 | | 3,382,000 |
| 2005 | "Konayuki" | Remioromen | 859,000 | 500,000 | 2,000,000 | 3,359,000 |
| 2008 | "Ti Amo" (Note: Physical sales from "The Birthday: Ti Amo" maxi single.) | Exile | 320,000 | 2,000,000 | 1,000,000 | 3,320,000 |
| 2006 | "Age Age Every Knight" | DJ OZMA | 250,000 | 1,000,000 | 2,000,000 | 3,250,000 |
| 2005 | "Sōsei no Aquarion" | Akino | 250,000 | 3,000,000 | | 3,250,000 |
| 2006 | "Mikazuki" | Ayaka | 243,000 | 2,000,000 | 1,000,000 | 3,243,000 |
| 2000 | "Tsunami" | Southern All Stars | 2,936,000 | 250,000 | — | 3,186,000 |
| 2010 | "Heavy Rotation" | AKB48 | 882,000 | 1,500,000 | 750,000 | 3,132,000 |
| 2007 | "Suirenka" | Shōnan no Kaze | 100,000 | 3,000,000 | | 3,100,000 |
| 2008 | "Kimi no Subete ni" | Spontania featuring Juju | 100,000 | 3,000,000 | | 3,100,000 |
| 2010 | "Ring a Ding Dong" | Kaela Kimura | 100,000 | 3,000,000 | | 3,100,000 |
| 1997 | "Can You Celebrate?" | Namie Amuro | 2,750,000 (Note: Combined sales from 8cm (1997/2) and 12cm (1997/12) CD releases.) | 250,000 | — | 3,000,000 |
| 2011 | "Happiness" | Ai | 27,713 | 3,000,000 | | 3,027,713 |
| 2018 | "Teacher Teacher" | AKB48 | — | 3,000,000 | | 3,000,000 |

=== Over 2 million copies ===
| Year | Song | Artist | Detailed Sales | | | Total Sales |
| Year | Song | Artist | Physical | Single Track | Chaku-uta | Total Sales |
|---|---|---|---|---|---|---|
| 1997 | "Zankoku na Tenshi no These" | Yoko Takahashi | 720,000 (Note: Combined sales from the 1997, 2003 and 2009 CD releases.) | 1,100,000 | 1,100,000 | 2,920,000 |
| 1991 | "Love Story wa Totsuzen ni" (Note: Released as a double A-side single with "Oh Yeah!".) | Kazumasa Oda | 2,542,000 | 250,000 | — | 2,792,000 |
| 2008 | "Kimi ni Utatta Love Song" | Lil'B | — | 2,700,000 | | 2,700,000 |
| 2011 | "Flying Get" | AKB48 | 1,626,000 | 1,000,000 | — | 2,626,000 |
| 2011 | "Everyday, Katyusha" | AKB48 | 1,608,000 | 1,000,000 | — | 2,608,000 |
| 2007 | "Lovin' Life" | Funky Monkey Babys | 100,000 | 2,500,000 | | 2,600,000 |
| 1995 | "Love Love Love" | Dreams Come True | 2,489,000 | 100,000 | — | 2,589,000 |
| 2013 | "Koi Suru Fortune Cookie" | AKB48 | 1,549,000 | 1,000,000 | — | 2,549,000 |
| 2000 | "Sakura Zaka" | Masaharu Fukuyama | 2,299,000 | 250,000 | — | 2,549,000 |
| 2006 | "Koi no Tsubomi" | Kumi Koda | 273,000 | 250,000 | 2,000,000 | 2,523,000 |
| 2000 | "Everything" | Misia | 2,007,000 (Note: Combined sales for the 8cm single, the vinyl and the "Junior + Gomi Club Extended Mix" vinyl) | 500,000 | — | 2,507,000 |
| 2004 | "Hitomi o Tojite" | Ken Hirai | 1,000,000 | 500,000 | 1,000,000 | 2,500,000 |
| 2008 | "Shuchishin" | Shuchishin | 500,000 | 1,000,000 | 1,000,000 | 2,500,000 |
| 2011 | "Yasashiku Naritai" | Kazuyoshi Saito | 2,500,000 | | | 2,500,000 |
| 1994 | "All I Want for Christmas Is You" | Mariah Carey | 1,500,000 (Note: Combined sales from the 8cm single (1995), the 12cm single (1996) and the remix single (2000).) | — | 1,000,000 | 2,500,000 |
| 2005 | "Tada... Aitakute" | Exile | 562,000 | 850,000 (Note: Combined certifications for the original version and the "Ballad Best" version.) | 1,000,000 | 2,412,000 |
| 2007 | "Migi Kara Kita Mono Wo Hidari He Ukenagasu No Uta" | Moody Katsuyama | — | — | 2,400,000 | 2,400,000 |
| 2008 | "Sunao ni Naretara" (Note: Released as a double A-side single with "I Can Be Free".) | Juju | 100,000 | 2,300,000 | | 2,400,000 |
| 2009 | "Mister" | KARA | 145,000 | 1,250,000 | 1,000,000 | 2,395,000 |
| 1995 | "Departures" | Globe | 2,288,000 | 100,000 | — | 2,388,000 |
| 2009 | "Ichibu to Zenbu" | B'z | 380,000 | 1,000,000 | 1,000,000 | 2,380,000 |
| 2004 | "Towa ni Tomo ni" (Note: Released as a double A-side single with "Million Films".) | Kobukuro | 152,000 | 1,200,000 (Note: Combined certifications from the original version and the live version.) | 1,000,000 | 2,352,000 |
| 2006 | "Good-bye Days" | Yui for Kaoru Amane | 242,000 | 1,100,000 | 1,000,000 | 2,342,000 |
| 2012 | "Manatsu no Sounds Good!" | AKB48 | 1,822,000 | 500,000 | — | 2,322,000 |
| 2005 | "Planetarium" | Ai Otsuka | 316,000 | 1,000,000 | 1,000,000 | 2,316,000 |
| 2016 | "Koi" | Gen Hoshino | 312,000 | 2,000,000 | | 2,312,000 |
| 2006 | "Ketsui no Asa ni" | Aqua Timez | 1,100,000 | | 1,200,000 | 2,300,000 |
| 1995 | "True Love" | Fumiya Fujii | 2,023,000 | 250,000 | — | 2,273,000 |
| 2005 | "Endless Story" | Reira starring Yuna Ito | 500,000 | 750,000 | 1,000,000 | 2,250,000 |
| 2005 | "Glamorous Sky" | Nana starring Mika Nakashima | 500,000 | 750,000 | 1,000,000 | 2,250,000 |
| 1996 | "La La La Love Song" | Toshinobu Kubota | 2,000,000 | 250,000 | — | 2,250,000 |
| 2010 | "Motto Tsuyoku" | Exile | 250,000 | 1,000,000 | 1,000,000 | 2,250,000 |
| 2006 | "Taiyō no Uta" | Erika Sawajiri as Kaoru Amane | 500,000 | 750,000 | 1,000,000 | 2,250,000 |
| 2003 | "Yuki no Hana" | Mika Nakashima | 250,000 | 1,000,000 | 1,000,000 | 2,250,000 |
| 2007 | "Koko ni Iru yo" | SoulJa featuring Thelma Aoyama | 149,000 | 1,100,000 | 1,000,000 | 2,249,000 |
| 2008 | "Prisoner of Love" | Hikaru Utada | 82,000 | 1,100,000 | 1,000,000 | 2,182,000 |
| 1998 | "Automatic" (Note: Released as a double A-side single with "Time Will Tell".) | Hikaru Utada | 2,063,000 | 100,000 | — | 2,163,000 |
| 2005 | "Koko ni Shika Sakanai Hana" | Kobukuro | 407,000 | 750,000 | 1,000,000 | 2,157,000 |
| 2006 | "Kibun Jōjō" | Mihimaru GT | 131,000 | 1,000,000 | 1,000,000 | 2,131,000 |
| 2003 | "Jupiter" | Ayaka Hirahara | 925,000 | 200,000 | 1,000,000 | 2,125,000 |
| 2007 | "Michi" | Exile | 112,000 | 1,000,000 | 1,000,000 | 2,112,000 |
| 2010 | "Arigatō" | Ikimono-gakari | 250,000 | 1,100,000 | 750,000 | 2,100,000 |
| 2009 | "Love Forever" | Miliyah Kato and Shota Shimizu | 100,000 | 1,000,000 | 1,000,000 | 2,100,000 |
| 2010 | "Kimi tte" | Kana Nishino | 98,000 | 1,000,000 | 1,000,000 | 2,098,000 |
| 2003 | "Sakuranbo" | Ai Otsuka | 589,000 (Note: Combined sales from the original (2003) and "Encore Press" (2005) CD releases.) | 500,000 | 1,000,000 | 2,089,000 |
| 2010 | "Best Friend" | Kana Nishino | 71,000 | 1,000,000 | 1,000,000 | 2,071,000 |
| 2013 | "Sayonara Crawl" | AKB48 | 1,956,000 | 100,000 | — | 2,056,000 |
| 2008 | "Ai o Komete Hanataba o" | Superfly | 47,000 | 1,000,000 | 1,000,000 | 2,047,000 |
| 2010 | "Beginner" | AKB48 | 1,039,000 | 1,000,000 | — | 2,039,000 |
| 2008 | "Ginga Tetsudō 999" | Exile featuring M-flo | — | 1,000,000 | 1,000,000 | 2,000,000 |
| 2006 | "I Believe" | Ayaka | 250,000 | 750,000 | 1,000,000 | 2,000,000 |
| 2007 | "Peach" (Note: Released as a double A-side single with "Heart".) | Ai Otsuka | 250,000 | 750,000 | 1,000,000 | 2,000,000 |
| 2006 | "Precious" | Yuna Ito | 250,000 | 750,000 | 1,000,000 | 2,000,000 |
| 2008 | "Roppongi-Giroppon-" | Nezumisenpai | — | 2,000,000 | | 2,000,000 |
| 2009 | "Garden" | May J. featuring DJ KAORI, Diggy-MO', Clench and Blistah | — | 2,000,000 | | 2,000,000 |
| 2011 | "100 Mankai No I Love You" | Rake | — | 2,000,000 | | 2,000,000 |

== List of most-streamed songs in Japan ==
The following list covers the most-streamed songs in the country based on data compiled by Billboard Japan, with the data aggregation started since March 12, 2018.

| No. | Song | Artist(s) | Released | Streams (hundred million) |
|---|---|---|---|---|
| 1 | "Yoru ni Kakeru" | Yoasobi | 15 December 2019 | 12.3 |
| 2 | "Dried Flower" | Yuuri | 25 October 2020 | 11 |
| 3 | "Pretender" | Official Hige Dandism | 15 May 2019 | 10 |
| 3 | "Kaiju no Hanauta" | Vaundy | 11 May 2020 | 10 |
| 3 | "Idol" | Yoasobi | 12 April 2023 | 10 |
| 3 | "Ao to Natsu" | Mrs. Green Apple | 1 August 2018 | 10 |
| 7 | "Dynamite" | BTS | 21 August 2020 | 9.5 |
| 8 | "Tenbyō no Uta" | Mrs. Green Apple feat. Sonoko Inoue | 1 August 2018 | 9 |
| 8 | "Suiheisen" | Back Number | 13 August 2021 | 9 |
| 8 | "Subtitle" | Official Hige Dandism | 12 October 2022 | 9 |
| 8 | "Gunjō" | Yoasobi | 1 September 2020 | 9 |
| 12 | "Marigold" | Aimyon | 8 August 2018 | 8 |
| 12 | "Dance Hall" | Mrs. Green Apple | 24 May 2022 | 8 |
| 12 | "Lilac" | Mrs. Green Apple | 12 April 2024 | 8 |
| 12 | "W/X/Y" | Tani Yuuki | 26 May 2021 | 8 |
| 12 | "Hakujitsu" | King Gnu | 22 February 2019 | 8 |
| 12 | "Que Sera Sera" | Mrs. Green Apple | 25 April 2023 | 8 |
| 18 | "Kaibutsu" | Yoasobi | 6 January 2021 | 7.3 |
| 19 | "I Love..." | Official Hige Dandism | 12 February 2020 | 7.1 |
| 20 | "Betelgeuse" | Yuuri | 4 November 2021 | 7 |
| 20 | "Cinderella Boy" | Saucy Dog | 18 August 2021 | 7 |
| 20 | "115man Kilo no Film" | Official Hige Dandism | 11 April 2018 | 7 |
| 20 | "Takane no Hanako-san" | Back Number | 26 June 2013 | 7 |
| 20 | "Bling-Bang-Bang-Born" | Creepy Nuts | 6 January 2024 | 7 |
| 20 | "Soranji" | Mrs. Green Apple | 18 October 2022 | 7 |
| 20 | "Inferno" | Mrs. Green Apple | 18 July 2019 | 7 |
| 20 | "Kirari" | Fujii Kaze | 3 May 2021 | 7 |
As of March 4, 2026

== Best-selling singles by year ==
The following is a table of the yearly best-selling singles in Japan by physical sales (until 2018) and combined sales (including track sale equivalent) (since 2019).

| Year | Title | Artist | Sales | Chart Peak | References |
|---|---|---|---|---|---|
| 1968 | "Hoshikage no Waltz" | Masao Sen | | | |
| 1969 | "Yoake no Scat" | Saori Yuki | | | |
| 1970 | "Kuroneko no Tango" | Osamu Minagawa | | | |
| 1971 | "Watashi no Jōkamachi" | Rumiko Koyanagi | | | |
| 1972 | "Onna no Michi" | Shiro Miya, Pinkara Trio | | | |
| 1973 | "Onna no Michi" | Shiro Miya, Pinkara Trio | | | |
| 1974 | "Namida no Misao" | Tonosama Kings | | | |
| 1975 | "Shōwa Karesusuki" | Sakura and Ichirō | | | |
| 1976 | "Oyoge! Taiyaki-kun" | Masato Shimon | | | |
| 1977 | "Nagisa no Sindbad" | Pink Lady | | | |
| 1978 | "UFO" | Pink Lady | | | |
| 1979 | "Yume Oi Zake" | Jirō Atsumi | | | |
| 1980 | "Dancing All Night" | Monta and Brothers | | | |
| 1981 | "Ruby no Yubiwa" | Akira Terao | | | |
| 1982 | "Matsuwa" | Amin | | | |
| 1983 | "Sazanka no Yado" | Eisaku Ōkawa | | | |
| 1984 | "Moshimo Ashita ga..." | Warabe | | | |
| 1985 | "Julia ni Heartbreak" | The Checkers | | | |
| 1986 | "Cha-Cha-Cha" | Akemi Ishii | | | |
| 1987 | "Inochi Kurenai" | Eiko Segawa | | | |
| 1988 | "Paradise Ginga" | Hikaru Genji | | | |
| 1989 | "Diamonds" | Princess Princess | 814,570 | 1 | |
| 1990 | "Odoru Pompokolin" | B.B.Queens | 1,308,440 | 1 | |
| 1991 | "Oh Yeah!"/"Love Story wa Totsuzen ni" | Kazumasa Oda | 2,541,910 | 1 | |
| 1992 | "Kimi ga Iru Dake de" | Kome Kome Club | 2,762,210 | 1 | |
| 1993 | "Yah Yah Yah / Yume no Bannin" | Chage and Aska | 2,407,960 | 1 | |
| 1994 | "Innocent World" | Mr. Children | 1,812,970 | 1 | |
| 1995 | "Love Love Love"/"Arashi ga Kuru" | Dreams Come True | 2,351,940 | 1 | |
| 1996 | "Namonaki Uta" | Mr. Children | 2,302,910 | 1 | |
| 1997 | "Can You Celebrate?" | Namie Amuro | 2,223,090 | 1 | |
| 1998 | "Yuuwaku" | Glay | 1,611,920 | 1 | |
| 1999 | "Dango 3 Kyodai" | Kentarō Hayami, Ayumi Shigemori, Himawari Kids and Dango Gasshōdan | 2,918,220 | 1 | |
| 2000 | "Tsunami" | Southern All Stars | 2,886,940 | 1 | |
| 2001 | "Can You Keep a Secret?" | Hikaru Utada | 1,484,940 | 1 | |
| 2002 | "H" | Ayumi Hamasaki | 1,000,260 | 1 | |
| 2003 | "Sekai ni Hitotsu Dake no Hana" | SMAP | 2,108,565 | 1 | |
| 2004 | "Hitomi o Tojite" | Ken Hirai | 834,448 | 2 | |
| 2005 | "Seishun Amigo" | Shūji to Akira | 945,315 | 1 | |
| 2006 | "Real Face" | KAT-TUN | 1,038,923 | 1 | |
| 2007 | "Sen no Kaze ni Natte" | Masafumi Akikawa | 1,115,499 | 1 | |
| 2008 | "Truth/Kaze no Mukō e" | Arashi | 618,229 | 1 | |
| 2009 | "Believe/Kumorinochi, Kaisei" | Arashi, Kenta Yano starring Satoshi Ohno | 656,676 | 1 | |
| 2010 | "Beginner" | AKB48 | 954,283 | 1 | |
| 2011 | "Flying Get" | AKB48 | 1,587,229 | 1 | |
| 2012 | "Manatsu no Sounds Good!" | AKB48 | 1,820,056 | 1 | |
| 2013 | "Sayonara Crawl" | AKB48 | 1,955,162 | 1 | |
| 2014 | "Labrador Retriever" | AKB48 | 1,786,825 | 1 | |
| 2015 | "Bokutachi wa Tatakawanai" | AKB48 | 1,782,707 | 1 | |
| 2016 | "Tsubasa wa Iranai" | AKB48 | 1,519,387 | 1 | |
| 2017 | "Negaigoto no Mochigusare" | AKB48 | 1,391,691 | 1 | |
| 2018 | "Teacher Teacher" | AKB48 | 1,819,237 | 1 | |
| 2019 | "Sustainable" | AKB48 | 1,416,189 | 1 | |
| 2020 | "Imitation Rain/D.D." | SixTones, Snow Man | 1,780,306 | 1 | |
| 2021 | "Butter" | BTS | 1,809,650 | 2 | |
| 2022 | "Ichizu/Sakayume" | King Gnu | 1,456,349 | 1 | |
| 2023 | "Idol" | Yoasobi | 2,274,528 | 1 | |
| 2024 | "Nidone/Bling-Bang-Bang-Born" | Creepy Nuts | 2,493,509 | 1 | |
| 2025 | "Rose" | Hana | 1,777,793 | 2 | |

== See also ==
- J-pop
- List of best-selling albums in Japan
- Oricon Singles Chart
- Oricon Albums Chart
