= JASRAC Awards =

Japanese music awards

- JASRAC logo
- Awarded for: Songwriters and music publishers who have generated the highest revenue in royalties during a fiscal year
- Country: Japan
- Presented by: Japanese Society for Rights of Authors, Composers and Publishers
- First award: 1982
- Website: jasrac.or.jp/magazine/jasrac-awards

The JASRAC Awards (Japanese: JASRAC賞, Hepburn: Jasurakku-shō) is a music awards established in 1982, presented by the Japanese Society for Rights of Authors, Composers and Publishers (JASRAC), which is given to songwriters, composers and music publishers who have generated the highest revenue in royalties during a fiscal year.

== Overview ==
The JASRAC Awards is awarded to songwriters, composers and music publishers whose works have received the largest revenue in royalties by the JASRAC earned through music distribution, karaoke and media usage like features in advertisements. The top three songs out of the ten highest-grossing songs are awarded the Gold, Silver and Bronze Award while the International Award is given to the song with the highest revenue overseas and the Foreign Award is awarded to highest-earning non-Japanese song in Japan.

The winner of the Gold Prize for the fiscal year of 2024 was also awarded the Song of the Year for Creators at the 2025 Music Awards Japan which was presented by JASRAC.

== Milestones ==
In 2003, the background music for 2001 animated film Spirited Away composed by Joe Hisaishi became the first instrumental work to receive the Gold Award. In 2012, JASRAC announced that SMAP's 2003 single "Sekai ni Hitotsu Dake no Hana" had generated the most royalties in the 30-year history of the awards.

As of 2025, five songs won Gold Award for two consecutive years:

- Eiko Segawa – "Inochi Kurenai" (1988–1989)
- SMAP – "Sekai ni Hiitotsu Dake no Hana" (2004–2005)
- AKB48 – "Heavy Rotation" (2012–2013)
- Lisa – "Gurenge" (2021–2022)
- Yoasobi – "Idol" (2023–2024)

In 2012, the Gold, Silver and Bronze Awards was awarded to "Heavy Rotation", "Ponytail to Shushu" and "Beginner", all by AKB48. It was the second time in the award's history since 1996, when composer Tetsuya Komuro won Gold, Silver and Bronze Awards, that all three main awards were awarded for songs performed by a single artist. According to Asahi Shimbun, the idol group placed a total of five songs in the top ten of the highest crossing works in royalties in 2011. The following year, songs by AKB48 once again took Gold, Silver and Bronze Awards with "Heavy Rotation" winning Gold in the second consecutive year, "Flying Get" for Silver and "Everyday, Katyusha" for Bronze.

In 2015, the Silver, the Bronze, the International and the Foreign Awards were given to works related to animation music. The background music (BGM) of Attack on Titan and 1978's "Lupin III Theme" won Silver and Bronze respectively, while the Dragon Ball Z BGM won International Award and "Let It Go" from Frozen won Foreign Award. The Fairy Tail BGM won International Award in 2017 with 97.7% of the total royalties generated in France alone.

== Winners ==
=== 1980s ===
List of winners (1982–1987)
Year	Domestic		International		Ref.
Year	Song	Writer(s)	Song	Writer(s)	Ref.
1982	"Okuhida Bojō"	Tetsuya Ryū	"Sukiyaki"	Rokusuke Ei; Hachidai Nakamura	
1983	"Kita Sakaba"	Rei Nakanishi; Taiji Nakamura	"UFO Robot Grendizer"	Kōgo Hotomi; Shunsuke Kikuchi	
1985	"Yagiri no Watashi"	Miyuki Ishimoto; Tōru Funamura	"Candy Candy"	Kyoko Mizuki; Takeo Watanabe	
1986	"Naniwabushi da yo Jinsei wa"	Masato Fujita; Akito Yomo	"Sukiyaki"	Rokusuke Ei; Hachidai Nakamura	
1987	"Koi ni Ochite"	Reiko Yukawa; Akiko Kobayashi	"Sukiyaki"	Rokusuke Ei; Hachidai Nakamura	

List of winners (1988–1989)
Year	Gold		Silver		Bronze		International		Foreign		Ref.
Year	Song	Writer(s)	Song	Writer(s)	Song	Writer(s)	Song	Writer(s)	Song	Writer(s)	Ref.
1988	"Inochi Kurenai"	Osamu Yoshioka; Jun Kitahara	"Yukiguni"	Yoshi Ikuzō	"Otoko to Onna no Love Game"	Ben Uozumi; Kōji Makaino	Treasure Island BGM	Kentarō Haneda	"Cha Cha Cha"	G.Boido; Yūji Konno; B.Reitano; B.Rosellini; F.Baldoni; F.Reitano	
1989	"Inochi Kurenai"	Osamu Yoshioka; Jun Kitahara	"Kanpai"	Tsuyoshi Nagabuchi	"Mushaku Ryojō"	Daizaburō Nakayama	UFO Robot Grendizer BGM	Shunsuke Kikuchi	"Show Me"	Albert Cabrera; Bob Khozouri; Anthony Moran; Andy Tripoli; Hiromi Mori	

=== 1990s ===
List of winners (1990–1999)
Year	Gold		Silver		Bronze		International		Foreign		Ref.
Year	Song	Writer(s)	Song	Writer(s)	Song	Writer(s)	Song	Writer(s)	Song	Writer(s)	Ref.
1990	"Sake yo"	Yoshi Ikuzō	"Kanpai"	Tsuyoshi Nagabuchi	"Tonbo"	Tsuyoshi Nagabuchi	The Last Emperor BGM	Ryuichi Sakamoto	"Turn It into Love"	Mike Stock; Matt Aitken; Pete Waterman	
1991	"Kanpai"	Tsuyoshi Nagabuchi	"Futari no Ōsaka"	Osamu Yoshioka; Shōsuke Ichikawa	"Odoru Pompokolin"	Momoko Sakura; Tetsurō Oda	Cat's Eye BGM	Kazuo Ōtani	"When You Wish Upon a Star"	Ned Washington; Shimamura Yōji; Leigh Harline	
1992	"Love Story wa Totsuzen ni"	Kazumasa Oda	"Ai wa Katsu"	Kan	"Kanpai"	Tsuyoshi Nagabuchi	Saint Seiya BGM	Seiji Yokoyama	"Moon River"	Johnny Mercer; Henry Mancini	
1993	"Say Yes"	Ryo Aska	"Boku wa Kono Me de Uso o Tsuku"	Ryo Aska	"Kimi ga Iru Dake de"	Kome Kome Club	"The Miracle Planet on Strings"	Yoichiro Yoshikawa	"When You Wish Upon a Star"	Leigh Harline; Ned Washington; Yoji Shimamura	
1994	"Sekaijū no Dare yori Kitto"	Show Wesugi; Miho Nakayama; Tetsurō Oda	"Manatsu no Yo no Yume"	Yumi Matsutoya	"Makenai de"	Izumi Sakai; Tetsurō Oda	Magical Princess Minky Momo BGM	Hiroshi Takada	"We Are the Champ (The Name of the Game)"	Jean Déja; Armath; Roland Verlooven	
1995	"Survival Dance (No Cry No More)"	Tetsuya Komuro	"Innocent World"	Kazutoshi Sakurai	"Boy Meets Girl"	Tetsuya Komuro	Captain Tsubasa BGM	Hiromoto Tobisawa	"We Are the Champ (The Name of the Game)"	Jean Déja; Armath; Roland Verlooven	
1996	"Wow War Tonight"	Tetsuya Komuro	"Crazy Gonna Crazy"	Tetsuya Komuro	"Overnight Sensation"	Tetsuya Komuro	The Jungle Book BGM	Hideo Shimazu	"When You Wish Upon a Star"	Leigh Harline; Ned Washington; Yoji Shimamura	
1997	"Departures"	Tetsuya Komuro	"Na mo Naki Uta"	Kazutoshi Sakurai	"I'm Proud"	Tetsuya Komuro	New Lupin III BGM	Yuji Ohno	"Fly Me to the Moon"	Bart Howard; Kenji Sazanami	
1998	"Can You Celebrate?"	Tetsuya Komuro	"Face"	Tetsuya Komuro; Marc	"However"	Takuro	Sailor Moon BGM	Takanori Arisawa	"When You Wish Upon a Star"	Leigh Harline; Ned Washington; Yoji Shimamura	
1999	"Time Goes By"	Mitsuru Igarashi	"White Love"	Hiromasa Ijichi	Princess Mononoke BGM	Joe Hisaishi	Attack No. 1 BGM	Takeo Watanabe	"When You Wish Upon a Star"	Leigh Harline; Ned Washington; Yoji Shimamura	

=== 2000s ===
List of winners (2000–2009)
Year	Gold		Silver		Bronze		International		Foreign		Ref.
Year	Song	Writer(s)	Song	Writer(s)	Song	Writer(s)	Song	Writer(s)	Song	Writer(s)	Ref.
2000	"Automatic"	Hikaru Utada	"Time Will Tell"	Hikaru Utada	"Dango 3 Kyōdai"	Masahiko Satō; Masumi Uchino; Yoshiro Horie	Sailor Moon BGM	Takanori Arisawa	"All You Need Is Love"	John Lennon; Paul McCartney	
2001	"Tsunami"	Keisuke Kuwata	"Seasons"	Ayumi Hamasaki; Dai Nagao	"Love Machine"	Tsunku	Sailor Moon BGM	Takanori Arisawa	"Livin' la Vida Loca"	Draco Rosa; Desmond Child	
2002	"Everything"	Misia; Toshiaki Matsumoto	"Can You Keep a Secret?"	Hikaru Utada	"Lion Heart"	Shinji Nojima; Minoru Komorita	Pokémon BGM	Shinji Miyazaki	"Stand by Me"	Ben E. King; Jerry Leiber; Mike Stoller	
2003	Spirited Away BGM	Joe Hisaishi	"Traveling"	Hikaru Utada	"Amairo no Kami no Otome"	Jun Hashimoto; Kōichi Sugiyama	Pokémon BGM	Shinji Miyazaki	"Hikari"	Hikaru Utada	
2004	"Sekai ni Hitotsu Dake no Hana"	Noriyuki Makihara	Dragon Ball Z BGM	Shunsuke Kikuchi	"Amairo no Kami no Otome"	Jun Hashimoto; Kōichi Sugiyama	Pokémon BGM	Shinji Miyazaki	"Zoom-Zoom-Zoom"	João Carlos Rosman	
2005	"Sekai ni Hitotsu Dake no Hana"	Noriyuki Makihara	"Nada Sōsō"	Ryōko Moriyama; Begin	Mobile Suit Gundam SEED BGM	Toshihiko Sahashi	Pokémon BGM	Shinji Miyazaki	"Zoom-Zoom-Zoom"	João Carlos Rosman	
2006	"Hana"	Orange Range	"Sakura"	Daizō Yoshida; Ryō Tanaka; Kenta Kōno; Ryōji Ōtsuka	"Sekai ni Hitotsu Dake no Hana"	Noriyuki Makihara	Pokémon BGM	Shinji Miyazaki	"Zoom-Zoom-Zoom"	João Carlos Rosman	
2007	Howl's Moving Castle BGM	Joe Hisaishi	"Sakura"	Kentarō Kobuchi; Shunsuke Kuroda	"Konayuki"	Ryōta Fujimaki	Detective Conan BGM	Katsuo Ohno	"Zoom-Zoom-Zoom"	João Carlos Rosman	
2008	"Flavor of Life"	Hikaru Utada	Neon Genesis Evangelion BGM	Shirō Sagisu	"Lovers Again"	Kiyoshi Matsuo; Jin Nakamura	Dragon Ball Z BGM	Shunsuke Kikuchi	"Zoom-Zoom-Zoom"	João Carlos Rosman	
2009	"Soba ni Iru ne"	SoulJa	"Genesis of Aquarion"	Yūho Iwasato; Yoko Kanno	"Kiseki"	Greeeen	Ashita no Nadja BGM	Keiichi Oku	"Zoom-Zoom-Zoom"	João Carlos Rosman	

=== 2010s ===
List of winners (2010–2019)
Year	Gold		Silver		Bronze		International		Foreign		Ref.
Year	Song	Writer(s)	Song	Writer(s)	Song	Writer(s)	Song	Writer(s)	Song	Writer(s)	Ref.
2010	"Kiseki"	Greeeen	"Ti Amo"	Kiyoshi Matsuo; Jin Nakamura	"A Cruel Angel's Thesis"	Neko Oikawa; Hidetoshi Satō	Doraemon BGM	Shunsuke Kikuchi	"All You Need Is Love"	John Lennon; Paul McCartney	
2011	"A Cruel Angel's Thesis"	Neko Oikawa; Hidetoshi Satō	"Butterfly"	Kaela Kimura; Atsushi Suemitsu	"Mata Kimi ni Koi Shiteru"	Gorō Matsui; Masaaki Mori	"Barbapapa Sekai o Mawaru"	Kenichi Kamio	"All You Need Is Love"	John Lennon; Paul McCartney	
2012	"Heavy Rotation"	Yasushi Akimoto; Yō Yamazaki	"Ponytail to Shushu"	Yasushi Akimoto; Shinya Tada	"Beginner"	Yasushi Akimoto; Yoshimasa Inoue	Doraemon BGM	Shunsuke Kikuchi	"Shall We Dance?"	Oscar Hammerstein II; Richard Rodgers	
2013	"Heavy Rotation"	Yasushi Akimoto; Yō Yamazaki	"Flying Get"	Yasushi Akimoto; Shinya Sumida	"Everyday, Katyusha"	Yasushi Akimoto; Yoshimasa Inoue	Naruto Shippuden BGM	Yasuharu Takanashi	"Rising Sun"	Atsushi; Didrik Thott; Sebastian Thott; Johan Becker; Sharon Vaughn	
2014	"Memeshikute"	Shō Kiryūin	"Heavy Rotation"	Yasushi Akimoto; Yō Yamazaki	"Time Goes By"	Mitsuru Igarashi	Naruto Shippuden BGM	Yasuharu Takanashi	"Hey Jude"	John Lennon; Paul McCartney	
2015	"Koi Suru Fortune Cookie"	Yasushi Akimoto; Shintarō Itō	Attack on Titan BGM	Hiroyuki Sawano	"Theme from Lupin III '78"	Yuji Ohno	Dragon Ball Z BGM	Shunsuke Kikuchi	"Let It Go"	Kristen Anderson-Lopez; Robert Lopez	
2016	"Ryusei"	STY; Maozon	"Koi Suru Fortune Cookie"	Yasushi Akimoto; Shintarō Itō	"Ito"	Miyuki Nakajima	Kiteretsu Daihyakka BGM	Shunsuke Kikuchi	"Let It Go"	Kristen Anderson-Lopez; Robert Lopez	
2017	"Ito"	Miyuki Nakajima	Detective Conan BGM	Katsuo Ohno	"Dragon Quest Overture"	Kōichi Sugiyama	Fairy Tail BGM	Yasuharu Takanashi	"Daydream Believer"	John Stewart	
2018	"Koi"	Gen Hoshino	"Dragon Quest Overture"	Kōichi Sugiyama	"UFO"	Yū Aku; Shunichi Tokura	Dragon Ball Z BGM	Shunsuke Kikuchi	"Daydream Believer"	John Stewart	
2019	"Hero"	Ryosuke Imai; Sunny Boy	"UFO"	Yū Aku; Shunichi Tokura	"Ito"	Miyuki Nakajima	Dragon Ball Z BGM	Shunsuke Kikuchi	"Y.M.C.A."	Henri Belolo; Victor Willis; Ryūji Amagai	

=== 2020s ===
List of winners (2020–present)
Year	Gold		Silver		Bronze		International		Foreign		Ref.
Year	Song	Writer(s)	Song	Writer(s)	Song	Writer(s)	Song	Writer(s)	Song	Writer(s)	Ref.
2020	"Lemon"	Kenshi Yonezu	"Dragon Quest Overture"	Kōichi Sugiyama	"Ito"	Miyuki Nakajima	Naruto Shippuden BGM	Yasuharu Takanashi	"U.S.A."	Donatella Cirelli; Severino Lombardoni; Claudio Accatino; Anna Maria Gioco	
2021	"Gurenge"	Lisa; Kayoko Kusano	"Pretender"	Satoshi Fujihara	"Lemon"	Kenshi Yonezu	Naruto Shippuden BGM	Yasuharu Takanashi	"Daydream Believer"	John Stewart	
2022	"Gurenge"	Lisa; Kayoko Kusano	"Homura"	Yuki Kajiura; Lisa	"Dry Flower"	Yuuri	Naruto Shippuden BGM	Yasuharu Takanashi	"Dynamite"	Jessica Agombar; David Stewart	
2023	"Dry Flower"	Yuuri	"Yoru ni Kakeru"	Ayase	"Zankyōsanka"	Aimerrhythm; Masahiro Tobiuchi	Naruto Shippuden BGM	Yasuharu Takanashi	"Butter"	Jenna Andrews; Rob Grimaldi; Stephen Kirk; RM; Alex Bilowitz; Sebastian Garcia; Ron Perry	
2024	"Idol"	Ayase	"Kawaikute Gomen"	Shito	"Senkou"	Yoohei Kawakami	Naruto Shippuden BGM	Yasuharu Takanashi	"Bittersweet Samba"	Sol Lake	
2025	"Idol"	Ayase	"Bling-Bang-Bang-Born"	R-Shitei; DJ Matsunaga	"Show"	Tophamhat-Kyo; Giga; TeddyLoid	One Piece BGM	Kōhei Tanaka	"Soul Bossa Nova"	Quincy Jones	
2026	"Lilac"	Motoki Ohmori	"Kawa no Nagare no Yō ni"	Yasushi Akimoto; Akira Mitake	"Bling-Bang-Bang-Born"	R-Shitei; DJ Matsunaga	Naruto Shippuden BGM	Yasuharu Takanashi	"Bittersweet Samba"	Sol Lake	
