= Oricon Singles Chart =

Japanese music chart

The Oricon Singles Chart is the Japanese music industry-standard singles popularity chart issued daily, weekly, monthly and yearly by Oricon. Chart rankings are based on physical singles' sales. Until 2017, Oricon did not track download sales. In Japan, physical sales decreased sharply in the 2000s, while download sales hit three to four times the amount of single sales. In November 2017, Oricon introduced its first digital songs chart, separate from its main physical singles chart. On December 24, 2018, Oricon launched a streaming chart, and introduced a Combined Singles Chart that utilizes physical single sales, downloads, and streams.

Original Confidence Inc., the original Oricon company, was founded by the former Snow Brand Milk Products promoter Sōkō Koike in 1967. That November, the company began publishing a singles chart on an experimental basis. Entitled Sōgō Geinō Shijō Chōsa (総合芸能市場調査; Surveys of total entertainment markets). The chart became official on January 4, 1968.

Charts are published every Tuesday in Oricon Style and on Oricon's official website. Every Monday, Oricon receives data from outlets, but data on merchandise sold through certain channels does not make it into the charts. For example, the debut single of NEWS, a pop group, was released only through 7-Eleven stores, which are not covered by Oricon, and its sales were not reflected in the Oricon charts. Oricon's rankings of record sales are therefore not completely accurate. Before data was collected electronically, the charts were compiled on the basis of faxes that were sent from record shops.

The first number-one song on the Oricon Singles Chart was "Kitaguni no Futari (In a Lonesome City)" by Jackey Yoshikawa and His Blue Comets on November 2, 1967.

== Best-selling physical singles of all time ==
Rank	Year	Title	Artist	Sales
1	1975	"Oyoge! Taiyaki-kun" (およげ!たいやきくん)	Masato Shimon	4.577m
2	1972	"Onna no Michi" (女のみち)	Shiro Miya and Pinkara Trio	3.256m
3	2003	"Sekai ni Hitotsu Dake no Hana" (世界に一つだけの花)	SMAP	3.125m
4	2000	"Tsunami"	Southern All Stars	2.934m
5	1999	"Dango 3 Kyodai" (だんご3兄弟)	Kentarō Hayami, Ayumi Shigemori, Himawari Kids, Dango Gasshōdan	2.918m
6	1992	"Kimi ga Iru Dake de" (君がいるだけで)	Kome Kome Club	2.895m
7	1991	"Say Yes"	Chage & Aska	2.822m
8	1994	"Tomorrow Never Knows"	Mr. Children	2.766m
9	1991	"Oh! Yeah! / Love Story wa Totsuzen ni" (Oh! Yeah! / ラブ・ストーリーは突然に)	Kazumasa Oda	2.587m
10	1995	"Love Love Love / Arashi ga Kuru" (LOVE LOVE LOVE/嵐が来る)	Dreams Come True	2.488m

== See also ==
- List of Oricon number-one singles
- Oricon Albums Chart
- List of best-selling singles in Japan
- List of best-selling albums in Japan
