= List of best-selling singles in 1991 (Japan) =

This is a list of the best-selling singles in 1991 in Japan, as reported by Oricon.

Ranking	Single	Artist	Release	Sales
1	"Love Story wa Totsuzen ni"	Kazumasa Oda	February 6, 1991	2,542,000
2	"Say Yes"	Chage and Aska	July 24, 1991	2,504,000
3	"Ai wa Katsu"	Kan	September 1, 1990	1,863,000
4	"Donna Toki mo"	Noriyuki Makihara	June 10, 1991	1,164,000
5	"Hajimari wa Itsumo Ame"	Aska	March 6, 1991	1,071,000
6	"Anata ni Aete Yokatta"	Kyōko Koizumi	May 21, 1991	1,007,000
7	"Lady Navigation"	B'z	March 27, 1991	1,005,000
8	"Shabondama"	Tsuyoshi Nagabuchi	October 25, 1991	759,000
9	"Eyes to Me"	Dreams Come True	April 25, 1991	686,000
10	"Alone"	B'z	October 30, 1991	686,000

== See also ==
- List of Oricon number-one singles of 1991
