= 33rd Japan Record Awards =

1991 Japanese music awards ceremony

- Date: December 31, 1991
- Venue: Nippon Budokan, Tokyo
- Hosted by: Akira Fuse, Junichi Ishida, Tetsuko Kuroyanagi, Fumio Yamamoto (TBS)

Television/radio coverage
- Network: Japan News Network; Japan Radio Network

The 33rd Annual Japan Record Awards (第33回日本レコード大賞, Dai Sanjū-san Kai Nihon Rekōdo Taishō) took place at the Nippon Budokan in Chiyoda, Tokyo, December 31, 1991, starting at 7:00PM JST. The primary ceremonies were broadcast in Japan by TBS/JNN/JRN.

The audience rating was 14.7%.

== Award winners ==
=== Pops and Rock ===
==== Japan Record Award ====
- KAN for "Ai wa Katsu"

==== Best Vocalist Award ====
- Aska for "Hajimari wa itsumo ame"

==== Best New Artist Award ====
- Mi-Ke for "Omoide no Kujūkuri-hama"

==== Best Album Award ====
- Tatsuro Yamashita for "Artisan"

==== Gold disc Award (Nomination for the Japan Record Award) ====
- Tatsuro Yamashita for "Artisan"
- Kyōko Koizumi for "Anata ni aete yokatta"
- Chage and Aska for "Say Yes"
- Aska for "Hajimari wa itsumo ame"
- Kazumasa Oda for "Love Story wa Totsuzen ni"

==== New Artist Award (Nomination for the Best New Artist Award) ====
- Michiyo Nakajima for "Akai Hanataba"
- Noriyuki Makihara for "Donna toki mo"
- Mi-Ke for "Omoide no Kujūkuri-hama"
- Alisa Mizuki for "Densetsu no Shōjo"

==== Album Award ====
- Tatsuro Yamashita for "Artisan"
- Buck-Tick for "Kurutta Taiyou"
- Aska for "Scene II"
- X for "Jealousy"
- Yumi Matsutoya for "Tengoku no door"
- Eikichi Yazawa for "Don't Wanna Stop"
- Princess Princess for "Princess Princess"
- Yuko Hara for "Mother"
- B'z for "Risky"
- Dreams Come True for "Wonder 3"

==== Best Album / New Artist Award ====
- ORIGINAL LOVE for "LOVE!LOVE! & LOVE!"

==== Special Award ====
- Orquesta de la Luz

==== Composition Award ====
- ASKA for "SAY YES","Hajimari wa itsumo ame" （vo.:ASKA）

==== Arrangement Award ====
- Takeshi Kobayashi for "Anata ni aete yokatta" （vo.:Kyōko Koizumi）

==== Lyrics Award ====
- Kyōko Koizumi for "Anata ni aete yokatta" （vo.:Kyōko Koizumi）

==== Planning Award ====
- HIS(Haruomi Hosono, Kiyoshiro Imawano, Fuyumi Sakamoto) for "Nihon no hito"
- KRYZLER & KOMPANY
- The Nolans sang Japanese Idol & Pops
- Fumiaki Miyamoto for "Ao no kaori"

==== Best Foreign Artist ====
- Mariah Carey

=== Enka and Kayōkyoku ===
==== Japan Record Award ====
- Saburo Kitajima for "Kita no daichi"

==== Best Vocalist ====
- Fuyumi Sakamoto for "Hinokuni no onna"

==== Best New Artist ====
- Jun Karaki for "Yasegaman"

==== Best Album Award ====
- Takao Horiuchi for "GENTS"

==== Gold disc Award (Nomination for the Japan Record Award) ====
- Kaori Kozai for "Haguresō"
- Saburo Kitajima for "Kita no daichi"
- Kye Eun-Sook for "Kanashimi no hōmonsya"

==== New Artist Award (Nomination for the Best New Artist Award) ====
- Jun Karaki for "Yasegaman"
- Shijimi to Sazae for "Monomane Omoide no Kujūkuri-hama"

==== Album Award ====
- Mitsuko Nakanura for "Shiawase zake"
- Takao Horiuchi for "GENTS"
- Hitoshi Ueki for "Sūdara-Densetsu"

==== Composition Award ====
- Syōsuke Ichikawa for "Koi banka" （vo.:Natsuko Godai）

==== Arrangement Award ====
- Eiji Kawamura for "Kanashimi no hōmonsya" （vo.:Kye Eun-Sook）

==== Lyrics Award ====
- Takashi Taka for "Hinokuni no onna" （vo.:Fuyumi Sakamoto）

==== Planning Award ====
- Miyako Otsuki for "Hashi-monogatari Jissyō"
- Jirō Sugita for "Love Letter" (composed by Tadashi Yoshida)

==== Achievement Award ====
- Peggy Hayama (Introducing foreign songs)

==== Lifetime Achievement Award ====
- Hachiro Kasuga

==== Special Award ====
- Linda Yamamoto
- International Friendship Foundation and producer Hiroshi Itsuki

==== Hibari Misora Award ====
- Ayako Fuji for "Amayo zake"

== See also ==
- Japan Composer's Association
- Enka
- Kayōkyoku
- Hibari Misora
