= List of Oricon number-one singles of 1991 =

This is the list of number-one singles in Japan during 1991 according to Oricon Chart

January 7	(No information)	
January 14	"Ai wa Katsu" (愛は勝つ)	Kan
January 21	"Ai wa Katsu" (愛は勝つ)	Kan
January 28	"Ai wa Katsu" (愛は勝つ)	Kan
February 4	"Ai wa Katsu" (愛は勝つ)	Kan
February 11	"Ai wa Katsu" (愛は勝つ)	Kan
February 18	"Oh! Yeah!/Love Story wa Totsuzen ni"	Kazumasa Oda
February 25	"Oh! Yeah!/Love Story wa Totsuzen ni"	Kazumasa Oda
March 4	"Oh! Yeah!/Love Story wa Totsuzen ni"	Kazumasa Oda
March 11	"Oh! Yeah!/Love Story wa Totsuzen ni"	Kazumasa Oda
March 18	"Oh! Yeah!/Love Story wa Totsuzen ni"	Kazumasa Oda
March 25	"Oh! Yeah!/Love Story wa Totsuzen ni"	Kazumasa Oda
April 1	"Oh! Yeah!/Love Story wa Totsuzen ni"	Kazumasa Oda
April 8	"Lady Navigation"	B'z
April 15	"Lady Navigation"	B'z
April 22	"Wednesday Moon"	Hideaki Tokunaga
April 29	"Lady Navigation"	B'z
May 6	"Eyes to Me"	Dreams Come True
May 13	"Eyes to Me"	Dreams Come True
May 20	"Kiss"	Princess Princess
May 27	"Please"	Shizuka Kudo
June 4	"Love Train"	TMN
June 10	"Anata ni aete yokatta" (あなたに会えてよかった)	Kyōko Koizumi
June 17	"Anata ni aete yokatta" (あなたに会えてよかった)	Kyōko Koizumi
June 24	"Anata ni aete yokatta" (あなたに会えてよかった)	Kyōko Koizumi
July 1	"Anata ni aete yokatta" (あなたに会えてよかった)	Kyōko Koizumi
July 8	"Beat Emotion"	Tomoyasu Hotei
July 15	"Anata ni aete yokatta" (あなたに会えてよかった)	Kyōko Koizumi
July 22	"Neo Bravo!!"	Southern All Stars
July 29	"Donna Toki Mo." (どんなときも)	Noriyuki Makihara
August 5	"Say Yes"	Chage and Aska
August 12	"Say Yes"	Chage and Aska
August 19	"Say Yes"	Chage and Aska
August 26	"Say Yes"	Chage and Aska
September 2	"Say Yes"	Chage and Aska
September 9	"Say Yes"	Chage and Aska
September 16	"Say Yes"	Chage and Aska
September 23	"Say Yes"	Chage and Aska
September 30	"Say Yes"	Chage and Aska
October 7	"Say Yes"	Chage and Aska
October 14	"Say Yes"	Chage and Aska
October 21	"Say Yes"	Chage and Aska
October 28	"Say Yes"	Chage and Aska
November 4	"Shabontama" (しゃぼんたま)	Tsuyoshi Nagabuchi
November 11	"Alone"	B'z
November 18	"Alone"	B'z
November 25	"Wild Heaven"	TMN
December 2	"Boku wa kono hitomi de usowotsuku" (僕はこの瞳で嘘をつく)	Chage and Aska
December 9	"Piece of My Wish"	Miki Imai
December 16	"Piece of My Wish"	Miki Imai
December 23	"Piece of My Wish"	Miki Imai
December 30	"Sore ga Daiji" (それが大事)	Daiji-man Brothers Band
