= List of Oricon number-one singles of 1990 =

This is the list of number-one singles in Japan during 1990 according to Oricon Chart.

Issue date	Song	Artist
January 1	"Christmas Eve" (クリスマス・イブ)	Tatsuro Yamashita
January 8	(No information)	
January 15	"Christmas Eve" (クリスマス・イブ)	Tatsuro Yamashita
January 22	"Kuchibiru Kara Biyaku"	Shizuka Kudo
January 29	"Midnight Taxi"	Miho Nakayama
February 5	"Aku no Hana" (悪の華)	Buck-Tick
February 12	"Kuchibiru Kara Biyaku"	Shizuka Kudo
February 19	"Kōya no Megaroporisu" (荒野のメガロポリス)	Hikaru Genji
February 26	"No Titlist"	Rie Miyazawa
March 5	"Kiss Me Now" (今すぐKiss Me)	Lindberg
March 12	"Miss Me!" (見逃してくれよ！)	Kyōko Koizumi
March 19	"Kiss Me Now" (今すぐKiss Me)	Lindberg
March 26	"1990"	Complex
April 2	"Kiss Me Now" (今すぐKiss Me)	Lindberg
April 9	"Sexy Music"	Wink
April 16	"Sexy Music"	Wink
April 23	"Roman Hikō" (浪漫飛行)	Kome Kome Club
April 30	"Oh Yeah!"	Princess Princess
May 7	"Oh Yeah!"	Princess Princess
May 14	"Sayonara Jinrui" (さよなら人類)	Tama
May 21	"Senryū no Shizuku"	Shizuka Kudo
May 28	"Jealousy o nemura sete" (JEALOUSYを眠らせて)	Kyosuke Himuro
June 4	"Pure Gold"	Eikichi Yazawa
June 11	"Jealousy o nemura sete" (JEALOUSYを眠らせて)	Kyosuke Himuro
June 18	"Sayonara Jinrui" (さよなら人類)	Tama
June 25	"Taiyō no Komachi Angel" (太陽のKomachi Angel)	B'z
July 2	"Nichiyōbi" (にちようび)	Jitterin' Jinn
July 9	"Odoru Pompokolin" (おどるポンポコリン)	B.B.Queens
July 16	"The Point of Lover's Night"	TM Network
July 23	"Odoru Pompokolin" (おどるポンポコリン)	B.B.Queens
July 30	"Dear Friend"	Akina Nakamori
August 6	"Jōnetsu no bara" (情熱の薔薇)	The Blue Hearts
August 13	"Dear Friend"	Akina Nakamori
August 20	"Odoru Pompokolin" (おどるポンポコリン)	B.B.Queens
August 27	"Cocoro"	Hikaru Genji
September 3	"Odoru Pompokolin" (おどるポンポコリン)	B.B.Queens
September 10	"Odoru Pompokolin" (おどるポンポコリン)	B.B.Queens
September 17	"Odoru Pompokolin" (おどるポンポコリン)	B.B.Queens
September 24	"Odoru Pompokolin" (おどるポンポコリン)	B.B.Queens
October 1	"Watashi ni Tsuite"	Shizuka Kudo
October 8	"Time to Countdown"	TMN
October 15	"Easy Come, Easy Go!"	B'z
October 22	"Easy Come, Easy Go!"	B'z
October 29	"Easy Come, Easy Go!"	B'z
November 5	"Itoshii Hitoyo Good Night..." (愛しい人よGood Night...)	B'z
November 12	"Emitteyo" (笑ってよ)	Hikaru Genji
November 19	"Mizu ni Sashita Hana" (水に挿した花)	Akina Nakamori
November 26	"Silent Eve" (サイレント・イヴ)	Midori Karashima
December 3	"Julian" (ジュリアン)	Princess Princess
December 10	"Silent Eve" (サイレント・イヴ)	Midori Karashima
December 17	"Silent Eve" (サイレント・イヴ)	Midori Karashima
December 24	"Ai wa Katsu" (愛は勝つ)	Kan
December 31	"Ai wa Katsu" (愛は勝つ)	Kan

== See also ==
- 1990 in Japanese music
