= List of best-selling singles in 1992 (Japan) =

This is a list of the best-selling singles in 1992 in Japan, as reported by Oricon.

Ranking	Single	Artist	Release	Sales
1	"Kimi ga Iru Dake de"	Kome Kome Club	May 4, 1992	2,762,000
2	"Sadness Is Like Snow"	Shōgo Hamada	February 1, 1992	1,703,000
3	"Blowin'"	B'z	May 27, 1992	1,680,000
4	"Sore Ga Daiji"	Daiji MAN Brothers band	August 25, 1991	1,558,000
5	"Namida no Kiss"	Southern All Stars	July 18, 1992	1,523,000
6	"Garagara Hebi ga Yattekuru"	Tunnels	January 24, 1992	1,409,000
7	"'Mou Koi Nante Shinai"	Noriyuki Makihara	May 25, 1992	1,386,000
8	"If"	Chage and Aska	July 1, 1992	1,083,000
9	"Piece of My Wish"	Miki Imai	November 7, 1991	1,082,000
10	"Shallow Sleep"	Miyuki Nakajima	July 29, 1992	1,020,000
11	"Zero"	B'z	October 7, 1992	1,010,000
12	"Choo Choo Train"	Zoo	November 7, 1991	992,000

== See also ==
- List of Oricon number-one singles of 1992
