= List of best-selling singles in 1990 (Japan) =

This is a list of the best-selling singles in 1990 in Japan, as reported by Oricon.

Ranking	Single	Artist	Release	Sales
1	"Odoru Pompokolin"	B.B.Queens	April 4, 1990	1,308,000
2	"Roman Hikō"	Kome Kome Club	April 8, 1990	619,000
3	"Kiss Me (Ima sugu Kiss Me)"	Lindberg	February 7, 1990	610,000
4	"Sayonara Jinrui"	Tama	May 5, 1990	577,000
5	"Oh Yeah!"	Princess Princess	April 21, 1990	568,000
6	"Dear Friend"	Akina Nakamori	July 17, 1990	548,000
7	"Jōnetsu no Bara"	The Blue Hearts	July 25, 1990	511,000
8	"Kuchibiru kara Biyaku"	Shizuka Kudō	January 10, 1990	489,000
9	"Manatsu no Kajitsu"	Southern All Stars	July 25, 1990	474,000
10	"If We Hold on Together"	Diana Ross	January 25, 1990	462,000

== See also ==
- List of Oricon number-one singles of 1990
