= List of Oricon number-one singles of 1992 =

This is the list of number-one singles in Japan during 1992 according to Oricon Chart

Issue date	Song	Artist
6 January	(No information)	
13 January	"Sore ga Daiji"	Daiji-man Brothers Band
20 January	"Sore ga Daiji"	Daiji-man Brothers Band
27 January	"Sore ga Daiji"	Daiji-man Brothers Band
3 February	"Garagara hebi ga yattekuru"	Tunnels
10 February	"Kanashimi hayuki no yoni"	Shōgo Hamada
17 February	"Kanashimi hayuki no yoni"	Shōgo Hamada
24 February	"Garagara hebi ga yattekuru"	Tunnels
2 March	"Kanashimi hayuki no yoni"	Shōgo Hamada
9 March	"Kanashimi hayuki no yoni"	Shōgo Hamada
16 March	"Kanashimi hayuki no yoni"	Shōgo Hamada
23 March	"Kanashimi hayuki no yoni"	Shōgo Hamada
30 March	"Kanashimi hayuki no yoni"	Shōgo Hamada
6 April	"Kanashimi hayuki no yoni"	Shōgo Hamada
13 April	"Kanashimi hayuki no yoni"	Shōgo Hamada
20 April	"Kanashimi hayuki no yoni"	Shōgo Hamada
27 April	"Love Song"	Chage and Aska
4 May	"Koi wo shiyou yo Yeah! Yeah!"	Lindberg
11 May	"Itsumademo kawaranu ai wo"	Tetsurō Oda
18 May	"Kimi ga Iru Dake de"	Kome Kome Club
25 May	"Kimi ga Iru Dake de"	Kome Kome Club
1 June	"Kimi ga Iru Dake de"	Kome Kome Club
8 June	"Blowin'"	B'z
15 June	"Blowin'"	B'z
22 June	"Kimi ga Iru Dake de"	Kome Kome Club
29 June	"Kimi ga Iru Dake de"	Kome Kome Club
6 July	"Kimi ga Iru Dake de"	Kome Kome Club
13 July	"If"	Chage and Aska
20 July	"If"	Chage and Aska
27 July	"Kiss of Tears"	Southern All Stars
3 August	"Kiss of Tears"	Southern All Stars
10 August	"Kiss of Tears"	Southern All Stars
17 August	"Kiss of Tears"	Southern All Stars
24 August	"Kiss of Tears"	Southern All Stars
31 August	"Kiss of Tears"	Southern All Stars
7 September	"Kiss of Tears"	Southern All Stars
14 September	"Ichiban erai hito he"	Tunnels
21 September	"Ichiban erai hito he"	Tunnels
28 September	"Kessen wa Kinyōbi"	Dreams Come True
5 October	"Kessen wa Kinyōbi"	Dreams Come True
12 October	"Kessen wa Kinyōbi"	Dreams Come True
19 October	"Zero"	B'z
26 October	"Zero"	B'z
2 November	"Hare tara īne"	Dreams Come True
9 November	"Junrenka"	Tsuyoshi Nagabuchi
16 November	"Kurisumas ukyaroru no koroni ha"	Junichi Inagaki
23 November	"Ai no Wave"	Yumi Matsutoya
30 November	"Kurisumas ukyaroru no koroni ha"	Junichi Inagaki
7 December	"Kurisumas ukyaroru no koroni ha"	Junichi Inagaki
14 December	"Kurisumas ukyaroru no koroni ha"	Junichi Inagaki
21 December	"Kiss Me"	Kyosuke Himuro
28 December	"Sekaijū no Dare Yori Kitto"	Miho Nakayama and Wands
