= List of best-selling singles in 1999 (Japan) =

This is a list of the best-selling singles in 1999 in Japan, as reported by Oricon.

Ranking	Single	Artist	Release	Sales
1	"Dango 3 Kyodai"	Kentarō Hayami & Ayumi Shigemori	March 3, 1999	2,918,000
2	"Winter, Again"	Glay	February 3, 1999	1,638,000
3	"A"	Ayumi Hamasaki	August 11, 1999	1,622,000
4	"Energy Flow"	Ryuichi Sakamoto	May 26, 1999	1,519,000
5	"Automatic"	Hikaru Utada	December 9, 1998	1,290,000
6	"Addicted to You"	Hikaru Utada	November 10, 1999	1,290,000
7	"Movin' On Without You"	Hikaru Utada	February 17, 1999	1,226,000
8	"Love Machine"	Morning Musume	September 9, 1999	1,207,000
9	"Be with You"	Glay	November 25, 1998	1,173,000
10	"Heaven's Drive"	L'Arc-en-Ciel	April 21, 1999	1,124,000
11	"Flower"	KinKi Kids	May 26, 1999	1,039,000
12	"Boys & Girls"	Ayumi Hamasaki	July 14, 1999	1,033,000
13	"Last Chance "	Something Else	December 23, 1998	998,000
