= Mi-Ke =

Japanese band

- Origin: Japan
- Genres: J-pop
- Years active: 1991–1993
- Labels: BMG Rooms
- Past members: Haruka Murakami; Mami Watanabe; Keiko Utoku
- Website: Official website

Mi-Ke were an award-winning J-pop idol group in the early 1990s. Formed as the chorus group for B.B.Queens under Being Inc. recording agency, they had several singles which made the music charts, and released a number of albums.

Their music and onstage image were reminiscent of the 1960s. They also did a number of cover versions of older songs (some in English, some as Japanese translations) from the Beach Boys and from British Invasion groups.

The name Mi-Ke is a Japanese phrase meaning "three colors," commonly used for multicolored cats. Costumes used in performances usually featured different colors or styles.

== Members ==
- Keiko Utoku
- Mami Watanabe
- Haruka Murakami

== Biography ==
In the 1990s, the group debuted as back-up chorus singers in the B.B.Queens band. On 14 February 1991, they debuted with the single Omoide no Kujuukurihama. The group later went onto to win the Rookie of the Year award at various award ceremonies, including the Golden Discs Award and Nihon Record Taishou. As the first Being Inc. artists, they made their first appearance on the NHK's end of the year program Kouhaku Uta Gassen. From 1992 April until 1993 March, they were regular members of the NHK program NHK Hit Stage with total 31 broadcasts.

In August 1993 Keiko debuted as a soloist with single Anata no Yume no Naka Sotto Shinobikomitai. After the release of album Eien no Liverpool Sound ~ Please Please Me, Love, the group disappeared from the music scene, though Keiko continued to develop her solo career. There was never any announcement of the group disbanding or any kind of hiatus.

== Post Disbandment ==
In 2011, during the 20th anniversary of their original debut, the third compilation album Mi-Ke Golden Hits: 20th Anniversary included two previously unreleased songs. In 2012, Keiko appeared with B.B.Queens during the live special Being Legends, where, along with solo songs, she performed Mi-ke's biggest hits as well. Keiko has been active as a solo singer as of late 2021. Haruka currently runs her blog about plants and Mami works as an independent singer under the alias, JanMei.

== Discography ==
=== Albums ===
==== Studio albums ====
Title	Album details	Peak chart positions
Title	Album details	JPN Oricon
Omoide no G S Kujuukurihama (想い出のG.S.九十九里浜)	Released: 13 April 1991; Label: BMG Victor; Formats: CD, cassette	19
Natsukashii Blue Light Yokohama Yokosuka (懐かしのブルーライトヨコハマ ヨコスカ)	Released: 16 December 1991; Label: BMG Victor; Formats: CD, cassette	15
Wasureji no Folk Shiroi Shiroi Sangoshou (忘れじのフォーク・白い2白いサンゴ礁)	Released: 8 April 1992; Label: BMG Victor; Formats: CD, cassette	8
Taiyou no Shimo no Surfing Japan (太陽の下のサーフィン・JAPAN)	Released: 22 July 1992; Label: BMG Victor; Formats: CD, cassette	10
Asa Made Odorou Kanashiki Teddy Boy (朝まで踊ろう 悲しきテディ・ボーイ)	Released: 14 October 1992; Label: BMG Victor; Formats: CD, cassette	9
Yomigaeru 60's Namida no Vacation (甦る60's 涙のバケーション)	Released: 2 June 1993; Label: BMG Victor; Formats: CD, cassette	27
Eien no Liverpool Sound: Please Please Me, Love (永遠のリバプールサウンド プリーズ・プリーズ・ミー・ラブ)	Released: 18 December 1993; Label: BMG Victor; Formats: CD	65

==== Compilation albums ====
Title	Album details	Peak chart positions
Title	Album details	JPN Oricon
Complete of Mi-Ke at the Being Studio	Released: 13 April 2002; Label: B-Gram Records; Formats: CD, digital download	110
Best of Best 1000 Mi-Ke	Released: 13 April 2007; Label: B-Gram; Formats: CD	201
Mi-ke Best Hits	Released: 2010; Label: B-Gram; Formats: CD	-
Mi-Ke Golden Hits: 20th Anniversary	Released: 20 July 2011; Label: B-Gram; Formats: CD	121

=== Singles ===
Year	Single	Chart positions (JPN Oricon)	Chart positions (JPN Music Labo)	Label
1991	"Omoide no Kujuukurihama" (想い出の九十九里浜)	5	5	BMG Victor
1991	"Sukisa Sukisa Sukisa" (好きさ好きさ好きさ)	9		BMG Victor
1991	"Blue Light Yokosuka" (ブルーライト ヨコスカ)	13		BMG Victor
1991	"Mu~n na Kimochi wa Osenchi" (む〜んな気持ちはおセンチ)	50		BMG Victor
1991	"Shiroi Shiroi Sangoshou" (白い2白いサンゴ礁)	19		BMG Victor
1992	"Kanashiki Teddy Boy" (悲しきテディ・ボーイ)	10		BMG Victor
1992	"Surfing Japan" (サーフィン・JAPAN)	10		BMG Victor
1992	"Asa Made Odorou" (朝まで踊ろう)	15		BMG Victor
1992	"Pink Christmas"	22		BMG Victor
1992	"Namida no Vacation" (涙のバケーション)	19		BMG Victor
1993	"Please Please Me, Love"	15		BMG Victor

== Awards ==
- Japan Gold Disc Award 1992: Grand Prix New Artist, Best 5 New Artist
- 33rd Japan Record Awards: Best New Artist Award, New Artist Award (Nomination for the Best New Artist Award)
- 24th Japan Cable Awards: Best Newcomer Award

== In-media usage ==
- Omoide no Kujuukurihama was used as a theme song for TBS television series Nurse Station.
- Sukisa Sukisa Sukisa was used as an opening theme for NTV program N!Sanma.
- Blue Light Yokosuka was used as an ending theme for NTV Television quiz program Quiz Sekai Show by Jo-Bai!!.
- Mu~n na Kimochi wa Osenchi was used as an ending theme for Anime television series Obocchama kun!.
- Shiroi Shiroi Sangoshou was used as an ending theme for TV Asahi program Disney Time.
- Kanashiki Teddy Boy was used as an ending theme for NTV Television quiz program Quiz Sekai Show by Jo-Bai!!.
- Surfing Japan was used as a Snow Brand Milk Products commercial song of Tottemo Jelly.
- Asa Made Odorou was used as an insert song for TBS television series Tenshi no you ni Ikitemitai.
- Pink Christmas was used as an ending theme for NTV Television quiz program Quiz Sekai Show by Jo-Bai!!.
- Namida no Vacation was used as a theme song for NHK Program NHK Hit Stage.
- Please Please Me, Love was used as a theme song for Fuji TV television series Aijou Monogatari.

== Television appearances ==
=== Music Station ===
- Suki sa Suki sa Suki sa
- Blue Light Yokosuka
- Shiroi Shiroi Sangoshou
- Kanashiki Teddy Boy
- Surfing Japan
- Asa Made Odorou
- Pink Christmas (twice)
- Namida no Vacation
- Please, Please me Love

=== Kōhaku Uta Gassen ===
- 42nd: Omoide no Kujuu Kurihama
- 43rd: Namida no Vacation

Preceded by Ninja; Tama; Yang Soo-kyung; Saori Hareyama	Japan Record Award for Best New Artist; 1991	Succeeded by Masatoshi Ono
