= 34th Japan Record Awards =

1992 Japanese music awards ceremony

- Date: 31 December 1992
- Venue: Nippon Budokan, Tokyo
- Hosted by: Masaki Kanda, Tetsuko Kuroyanagi

Television/radio coverage
- Network: TBS

The 34th Japan Record Awards were held on 31 December 1992, and were broadcast live on TBS.

== Award winners ==
=== Pops and Rock ===
- Japan Record Award:
  - Kome Kome Club for "Kimi ga Iru Dake de"
- Best Vocalist:
  - Seiko Matsuda
- Best New Artist:
  - Masatoshi Ono
- Best Album:
  - Southern All Stars for "世に万葉の花が咲くなり"
- Best Foreign Artist:
  - Bobby Caldwell

=== Enka and Kayōkyoku ===
- Japan Record Award:
  - Miyako Otsuki for "白い海峡"
- Best Vocalist:
  - Yutaka Yamakawa
- Best New Artist:
  - Miyuki Nagai
- Best Album:
  - Fuyumi Sakamoto for "男惚れ"
