= Chage =

Japanese musician and radio personality

- Born: Shuji Shibata; 6 January 1958 (age 68); Kokurakita-ku, Kitakyūshū, Fukuoka Prefecture, Japan
- Genres: Pop; J-pop
- Occupations: Singer-songwriter; singer; radio personality; photographer
- Instruments: Vocals; guitar; ukulele
- Years active: 1976–
- Labels: EMI Music Japan (1998); Universal Sigma (2008–)
- Website: Official website

Shuji Shibata (Japanese: 柴田 秀之, Hepburn: Shibata Shūji; born 6 January 1958), known professionally as Chage, is a Japanese musician and radio personality. He was born in Kokurakita-ku, Kitakyūshū, Fukuoka Prefecture. He dropped out from Japan University of Economics. He is also a singer-songwriter, and he is the main vocalist and lyricist-composer of Chage and Aska.

== Discography ==
=== Albums ===
==== Original albums ====
Year	Title	Notes
1998	2nd	
2008	Aishiteru	
2010	&C	
2015	Hurray!	Mini album
2016	Another Love Song	Mini album

==== Best albums ====
Year	Title
1998	Chakū Chage Seisen-shū
1998	Chage Best Songs / Prologue

==== Project albums ====
Year	Title
1999	Treasure Box Vol. 1
2009	Many Happy Returns

==== Limited albums ====
Year	Title	Link
2011	Chage Live Tour 10-11 "Mawase Ōkina Chikyūgi"	iTunes Store
2013	Chage no Chakai 2012 –Za Ai Tōyoko Hama–	iTunes Store

==== Live albums ====
Year	Title
2016	Chage Live Tour 2016 –Mō hitotsu no Love Song–

=== Singles ===
==== As Yuko Ishikawa and Chage ====
Year	Title
1984	"Futari no Ai Land / Nagisa no Chikai"

==== Original singles ====
Year	Title	Notes
1998	"Tokyo Tower / Undo"	
2008	"waltz / Boys Life Hanagoyomi"	From Naoto Otomo Produce Popular Week Chage Concert on 1 March 2008
2010	"Mawase Ōkina Chikyūgi / Muteki no Umi e The Fishes"	
2011	"Tokyo Moon / Tōkuhe Ikitai"	

==== Limited singles ====
Year	Title	Notes	Ref.
2012	"Go! Go! Go! / Tokyo Moon Futari no Ai Land –Chagettles Cover Version–"		
2014	"Chage Fan Meeting Tour 2014 –Aoi Handkerchief o...–"	Live sound source of "Aishiteru" and "Nagai Tsuitachi"	
2015	"Tenshi ga kureta Hammer"		

=== Videography ===
Year	Title	Form	Std. Product No.	Ref.
1998	Chage "Ōini Utau" in Budōkan	VHS	TOVF-1292	
2001	Feeling Place	DVD	YCBR-00005	
2005	Missing Pages	DVD	CGSIR 902102	
2009	Chage Concert Tour 2008 Aishiteru	DVD	POBD-22005	
2010	Chage Document 2009 –Hibi Sunawachikore Sora–	DVD	CGDVD902101	
2011	Chage Live Tour 10-11 "Mawase Ōkina Chikyūgi"	DVD	POBD-22042	
2015	Chage Live Tour 2014 –equal–	DVD	POBD-22080	
2016	Chage Live Tour 2014 –Tenshi ga kureta Hammer–	DVD	UPBY-5039	

=== Books, photo collections ===
Year	Title	Code
1994	Tsuki ga Iiwake o shi teru	ISBN 4-87728-030-8
1997	Tsuki ga Iiwake o shi teru: Bunko-ban	ISBN 4-87728-426-5
2009	Kasha'! Shashin de Tsuzuru Shiawasena Onpu	ISBN 978-4-584-13156-5

=== Limited editions ===
Fan clubs

Year	Title
1996	Chage In U.S.A. Well, Well, Well The Video of Chage & Aska Tug of C&A Vol.5

== Filmography ==
=== Radio ===
Year	Title	Network
1989	Super FM Magazine: Chage no Noru Soru	Tokyo FM
1994	Chage no Radi-ō	Tokyo FM
1998	Chage no Treasure Box	Tokyo FM
2003	Konya wa Chage Raccho	Air-G'
2007	Day Break Friday: Chage no Daybreak Time	JFN
2010	Chage no Oto	JFN
2011	Chage no Big Special: Mayonaka no Ongaku-shitsu	Tokyo FM

=== Television ===
Year	Title	Network
1998	P-Stock	Fuji TV
2008	Collab Lab: Yume no Ongaku Kōbō	WOWOW
2009	M Live	TBS
2016	Shabekuri DJ Chage no Music Hour!	Kayo Pops Channel

=== Guest ===
Year	Title	Network
2015	Utage! Haru no Saiten! Ano Dai Hit Kyoku Utai Odoru Utage no 2-jikan SP	TBS

=== Advertisements ===
Year	Title	Ref.
1998	NEC Kigyō CM	
2011	Mister Donut "Cool Misted"	
