= List of best-selling singles in 2016 (Japan) =

This is a list of the best-selling singles in 2016 in Japan, physical sales are taken from Oricon. Digital sales are taken from the certifications of RIAJ in 2016.

Ranking	Single	Artist	Physical	Digital	TOTAL
1	"Tsubasa wa Iranai"	AKB48	1,519,387		1,519,387
2	"Kimi wa Melody"	AKB48	1,294,962		1,294,962
3	"LOVE TRIP/Shiawase wo Wakenasai"	AKB48	1,213,660		1,213,660
4	"High Tension"	AKB48	1,202,533		1,202,533
5	"Umi no Koe"	Kenta Kiritani		1,000,000	1,000,000
6	" Sayonara no Imi"	Nogizaka46	910,811		910,811
7	"Hadashi de Summer"	Nogizaka46	851,229		851,229
8	"I Seek / Daylight"	ARASHI	828,533		828,533
9	"Harujion ga Saku Koro "	Nogizaka46	828,315		828,315
10	"Zenzenzense"	RADWIMPS		750,000	750,000
11	"Koi"	Gen Hoshino	190,348	500,000	690,348
12	"Kuchibiru ni Be My Baby"	AKB48	182,786	500,000	682,786
13	"Silent Majority"	Keyakizaka46	376,871	250,000	626,871
14	"Fukkatsu Love"	ARASHI	541,121		541,121
15	"Hanataba o Kimi ni"	Hikaru Utada		500,000	500,000
16	"Power of the Paradise"	ARASHI	471,619		471,619
17	"Futari Sezon"	Keyakizaka46	467,845		467,845
18	"Sekai ni Hitotsu Dake no Hana"	SMAP	439,774		439,774
19	"Sekai ni wa Ai Shika Nai"	Keyakizaka46	392,719		392,719
20	"Chicken Line"	SKE48	365,328		365,328
Blank means no respective version was released or no certification in this year.

== See also ==
- List of Oricon number-one singles of 2016

== Notes ==
- Umi no Koe was released on December 2, 2015, certified as Million in April 2016 by RIAJ.
- Kuchibiru ni Be My Baby was released on December 9, 2015. Its B-side song, 365 Nichi no Kamihikouki, was certified as Double Platinum in July 2016 by RIAJ.
