= List of best-selling singles in 2002 (Japan) =

This is a list of the best-selling singles in 2002 in Japan, as reported by Oricon.

Ranking	Single	Artist	Release	Sales
1	"H"	Ayumi Hamasaki	July 24, 2002	1,000,000
2	"Traveling"	Hikaru Utada	November 28, 2001	856,000
3	"Wadatsumi no Ki"	Chitose Hajime	February 6, 2002	839,000
4	"Life goes on"	Dragon Ash	January 23, 2002	804,000
5	"Way of Difference"	Glay	February 27, 2002	730,000
6	"Sakura Drops"	Hikaru Utada	May 9, 2002	686,000
7	"My Grandfather's Clock"	Ken Hirai	August 28, 2002	667,000
8	"Ai no Uta"	Strawberry Flower	December 6, 2001	632,000
9	"Voyage"	Ayumi Hamasaki	September 26, 2002	628,000
10	"Hikari"	Hikaru Utada	March 20, 2002	598,000
