= List of best-selling singles in 2001 (Japan) =

This is a list of the best-selling singles in 2001 in Japan, as reported by Oricon.

Ranking	Single	Artist	Release	Sales
1	"Can You Keep a Secret?"	Hikaru Utada	February 16, 2001	1,484,000
2	"M"	Ayumi Hamasaki	December 13, 2000	1,319,000
3	"Pieces of a Dream"	Chemistry	March 7, 2001	1,131,000
4	"Naminori Jonny"	Keisuke Kuwata	July 4, 2001	1,104,000
5	"Ren'ai Revolution 21"	Morning Musume	December 13, 2000	986,000
6	"Shiroi koibitotachi"	Keisuke Kuwata	October 24, 2001	957,000
7	"Evolution"	Ayumi Hamasaki	January 31, 2001	955,000
8	"Boku no Senaka ni wa Hane ga Aru"	KinKi Kids	February 7, 2001	919,000
9	"Lifetime Respect"	Dōzan Miki	May 23, 2001	897,000
10	"Agehachō"	Porno Graffitti	June 27, 2001	890,000
