= List of best-selling singles in 2020 (Japan) =

This is a list of the best-selling singles in 2020 in Japan, with physical and digital sales taken from Oricon year-end chart.

== Combined sales ==
| No. | Title | Artist | Point |
|---|---|---|---|
| 1 | "Imitation Rain / D.D." | SixTones vs Snow Man | 1,780,306 |
| 2 | "Shiawase no Hogoshoku" | Nogizaka46 | 1,265,582 |
| 3 | "Shitsuren, Arigatō" | AKB48 | 1,187,338 |
| 4 | "Kite" | Arashi | 1,155,114 |
| 5 | "Step and a Step" | NiziU | 1,052,471 |
| 6 | "Gurenge" | LiSA | 1,048,345 |
| 7 | "Kissin' My Lips / Stories" | Snow Man | 1,030,718 |
| 8 | "Homura" | LiSA | 948,730 |
| 9 | "Yoru ni Kakeru" | Yoasobi | 917,753 |
| 10 | "I Love…" | Official Hige Dandism | 878,495 |

== Physical sales ==
| No. | Title | Artist | Sales |
|---|---|---|---|
| 1 | "Imitation Rain / D.D." | SixTones vs Snow Man | 1,760,904 |
| 2 | "Shitsuren, Arigatō" | AKB48 | 1,181,701 |
| 3 | "Kite" | Arashi | 1,147,865 |
| 4 | "Shiawase no Hogoshoku" | Nogizaka46 | 1,115,150 |
| 5 | "Kissin' My Lips / Stories" | Snow Man | 1,001,570 |
| 6 | "Navigator" | SixTones | 707,699 |
| 7 | "Sonna Koto Nai yo" | Hinatazaka46 | 644,135 |
| 8 | "Mazy Night" | King & Prince | 591,673 |
| 9 | "Smile" | Twenty★Twenty | 502,143 |
| 10 | "New Era" | SixTones | 480,379 |
| 11 | "Mai Ochiru Hanabira (Faillin' Flower)" | Seventeen | 426,988 |
| 12 | "Nobody's Fault" | Sakurazaka46 | 408,926 |
| 13 | Protostar ("Infinity") | JO1 | 372,820 |
| 14 | "Re:Live" | Kanjani Eight | 351,054 |
| 15 | "Step and a Step" | NiziU | 344,661 |
| 16 | "Sōyūtoko Aru yo ne?" | SKE48 | 325,609 |
| 17 | Stargazer ("Oh-Eh-Oh") | JO1 | 312,404 |
| 18 | "Mubō na Yume wa Sameru Koto ga Nai" | STU48 | 292,738 |
| 19 | "Run" | Sexy Zone | 272,746 |
| 20 | "Not Found" | Sexy Zone | 262,677 |
| 21 | "Night Diver" | Haruma Miura | 245,007 |
| 22 | "Homura" | LiSA | 232,510 |
| 23 | "Shōko" | Johnny's West | 231,467 |
| 24 | "I am / Muah Muah" | Hey! Say! Jump | 226,381 |
| 25 | "Your Song" | Hey! Say! Jump | 224,568 |

== Digital sales (single track) ==
| No. | Title | Artist | Sales |
|---|---|---|---|
| 1 | "Gurenge" | LiSA | 942,691 |
| 2 | "Homura" | LiSA | 709,966 |
| 3 | "I Love…" | Official Hige Dandism | 638,058 |
| 4 | "Yoru ni Kakeru" | Yoasobi | 539,090 |
| 5 | "Pretender" | Official Hige Dandism | 538,314 |
| 6 | "Hakujitsu" | King Gnu | 513,603 |
| 7 | "Kanden" | Kenshi Yonezu | 499,084 |
| 8 | "Hadaka no Kokoro" ("Naked Heart") | Aimyon | 403,820 |
| 9 | "Kōsui" | Eito | 499,084 |
| 10 | "Uma to Shika" | Kenshi Yonezu | 317,060 |

== See also ==
- List of Oricon number-one singles of 2020
