= List of best-selling singles in 2000 (Japan) =

This is a list of the best-selling singles in 2000 in Japan, as reported by Oricon.

| Ranking | Single | Artist | Release | Sales |
|---|---|---|---|---|
| 1 | "Tsunami" | Southern All Stars | January 26, 2000 | 2,886,000 |
| 2 | "Sakura Zaka" | Masaharu Fukuyama | April 26, 2000 | 2,280,000 |
| 3 | "Wait & See (Risk)" | Hikaru Utada | April 19, 2000 | 1,662,000 |
| 4 | "Love, Day After Tomorrow" | Mai Kuraki | December 8, 1999 | 1,385,000 |
| 5 | "Seasons" | Ayumi Hamasaki | June 7, 2000 | 1,362,000 |
| 6 | "Lion Heart" | SMAP | August 30, 2000 | 1,284,000 |
| 7 | "Koi no Dance Site" | Morning Musume | January 26, 2000 | 1,229,000 |
| 8 | "Kon'ya Tsuki no Mieru Oka ni" | B'z | February 9, 2000 | 1,128,000 |
| 9 | "Chocotto Love" | Petitmoni | November 25, 1999 | 1,123,000 |
| 10 | "Neo Universe/Finale" | L'Arc-en-Ciel | January 19, 2000 | 1,103,000 |
