= Roman Hikō =

Single by Kome Kome Club

from the album Komeguny
- Released: April 8, 1990
- Genre: Pop, pop rock
- Length: 4:08
- Songwriter(s): Kome Kome Club
- Producer(s): Kome Kome Club

Kome Kome Club singles chronology
"'Funk Fujiyama'" (1989)	"Roman Hikō" (1990)	"'Shake Hip!'" (1990)

"Roman Hikō" (浪漫飛行, lit. "Romantic Flight") is a Japanese song by Kome Kome Club released on April 8, 1990. It was included in their 1987 album Komeguny. Originally conceptualized as a song for a hypothetical airline commercial, the hypothetical became reality in 1990 as Japan Airlines adopted the song for their television advertisement. It peaked at number one on the Oricon chart. In the Oricon yearly chart of 1990, it became the second best-selling song in Japan behind "Odoru Pompokolin." In 2007, Kome Kome Club released the remix version of the song in their album komedia.jp.

== Cover versions ==
On April 23, 2003, Psycho le Cému released a cover of this song.

In 2010, hip-hop unit Halcali also covered the song, reworking it into a tropical ska tune. The song was also the image theme song for Sony's Cyber-shot camera. In the same year, Debbie Gibson covered it in English in her Japan-only album Ms. Vocalist.

In 2017, duo FEMM released a cover for their album "80s/90s J-POP REVIVAL", and released it as part of the double single "Sotsugyō / Roman Hikō" (卒業 / 浪漫飛行).

On August 9, 2023, a tribute album dedicated to the song was released, featuring reinterpretations of the song by artists including Gospellers, Shoko Nakagawa, Razor Ramon RG, Houshou Marine, Anly, and Yusuke.
