= Dango 3 Kyodai =

"Dango 3 Kyōdai"

Single by Kentaro Hayami, Ayumi Shigemori, Himawari Kids and Dango Gasshōdan
- Released: March 3, 1999
- Genre: Tango
- Length: 4:13
- Label: Pony Canyon
- Songwriter(s): Horie Yoshiro, Satou Masahiko, Uchino Masumi
- Producer(s): Masahiko Satō

Kentarō Hayami singles chronology
"'Mach GoGoGo 97'" (1997)	"Dango 3 Kyōdai" (1999)	"'Moero×4 Robokon!!'" (1999)

"Dango 3 Kyodai" (だんご3兄弟, Dango San Kyōdai, "Three Dango Brothers") is a Japanese song released on March 3, 1999. The song caused a social phenomenon in Japan. On the Japanese Oricon weekly single charts, it debuted at the number-one position with the sales of over one million copies. It was considered that the song might surpass the record of "Oyoge! Taiyaki-kun". However, it spent at the top position for only three consecutive weeks. In fact, this song proved that "Oyoge! Taiyaki-kun" had been extraordinary. According to the Oricon, it sold over 2.91 million copies, becoming the third best-selling single in Japan at that time. However, Southern All Stars's "Tsunami" surpassed the record in 2005.

== See also ==
- List of best-selling singles in Japan
