= Masato Shimon =

Masato Shimon 子門 真人
- Also known as: Kōichi Fuji; Akira Tani; Ren Daian; Santana; Tomio Nunokawa; Peter Simon; Ryu Kisami
- Born: Masaharu Fujikawa (藤川 正治） January 4, 1944 (age 82); Meguro, Tokyo, Tokyo, Japan
- Years active: 1966-1999

Masato Shimon (子門 真人, Shimon Masato; born January 4, 1944) (also known as Masato Simon), born with the name Masaharu Fujikawa (藤川 正治, Fujikawa Masaharu) is a retired Japanese vocalist from Meguro, Tokyo. He is most known for his contributions to the theme songs of various anime and tokusatsu series. In his career, he has sung under the names Koichi Fuji (藤 浩一, Fuji Kōichi), Akira Tani (谷 あきら, Tani Akira) and most famously, Masato Shimon. He recorded a song "Oyoge! Taiyaki-kun" (1975) with only 50,000 yen, but the single sold 4,547,620 copies and became the best-selling single in Japan, a fact certified by Guinness World Records. He retired from his career at age 55 in 1999, with his last work being the opening and closing songs to Seijuu Sentai Gingaman the year prior, credited as Ryu Kisami.
