= Ai wa Katsu =

Single by Kan

from the album Yakyū Senshu ga Yume datta
- B-side: "Soredemo Furarete shimau Yatsu"
- Released: September 1, 1990 (Japan)
- Recorded: 1990
- Genre: J-pop
- Length: 4:07
- Label: Polydor
- Songwriter: Kan

Kan singles chronology
"Kenzen Anzen Kōseinen" (1990)	"Ai wa Katsu" (1990)	"In the Name of Love" (1991)

Licensed audio
- "Ai wa Katsu" on YouTube

"Ai wa Katsu" (愛は勝つ, literally "Love will win") is a song composed and recorded by Japanese singer-songwriter Kan, released as the artist's eighth single in September 1990. It was initially featured on his album Yakyū Senshu ga Yume datta, issued a month before the single came out. The song became the performer's first charting hit and the most successful single with sales of over 2 million copies, and has been regarded as his signature song.

== Song information ==
=== Release and reception ===
"Ai wa Katsu" is the lead-off track of Yakyu Senshu ga Yume datta, the composer's fifth studio album which was released on July 25, 1990. Inspired by one of his most respected American singer Billy Joel, Kan wanted to compose a song that had similar upbeat like Billy Joel's Uptown Girl. The whole song was quartered and has many transpositions. It was difficult, and it required multiple recordings in the studio to complete.

It was used as the opening theme of a quiz show aired on TV Asahi during summer 1990, and released as the second single from the album.

Kan had previously released seven singles at the time, but none of them entered the chart. Polydor Records had not anticipated it would be a big hit, and issued only 10,000 copies of CD singles at the first pressing. Therefore, "Ai wa Katsu" had not attained immediate chart success upon its release.

To promote his new album, "Ai wa Katsu" first obtained intensive airplay on radio stations of the Kansai district. The song had gradually captured more attention in the country's other regions, providing the artist with the first chart entry. It was also featured on the popular variety show Yamada Katsutenai TV aired on Fuji Television, lifting the single to the summit of the Japanese Oricon sales chart by the end of 1990.

"Ai wa Katsu" spent 8 weeks atop on the Oricon chart, ranking at number three on the country's best-selling singles list of 1991. Sales of the single surpassed 2 million during its chart stay of 52 weeks.

== Cover versions ==
- On August 28, 1991, Hong Kong singer Jacky Cheung covered the song under the name 壯志驕陽 (An Aspiring Sun) for his album 一顆不變心 (An Unwavering Heart).
- On October 6, 2010, voice actor Shintarō Asanuma covered it as a character song for Ōkami-san to Shichinin no Nakamatachi – Character Song Album – Otogi Songs Best 10.
- On May 25, 2011, voice actor Jun Fukuyama covered it for his third studio album Fukuyama Jun, Ai wo Utau!.

== Other media ==
- The song was performed by the main character Jiro Suzuki during episode 6 of 1994–1995 anime カラオケ戦士マイク次郎 (Karaoke Senshi Mike Jirou).
- On May 6, 2020, Japanese teachers and staffs from a local prefecture Suruga-ku, Shizuoka, Shizuoka Gakuen Junior and Senior High School joined forces and performed the song altogether as a form of inspiration to 'let's overcome the Coronavirus together' for their students. The video has been uploaded to its official YouTube channel.

== Track listing ==
All songs composed by Kan

No.	Title	Arranger	Length
1.	"Ai wa Katsu (愛は勝つ)"	Kan, Shingo Kobayashi	4:07
2.	"Soredemo Furarete Shimau Yatsu (それでもふられてしまう男)"	Jun Sato	3:42
3.	"Ai wa Katsu (愛は勝つ)" (Karaoke)	Kan, Kobayashi	4:07
Total length:			11:57

== Personnel ==
Credits adapted from Yakyū Senshu ga Yume datta album sleeve notes.

- Kan: lead vocals
- Shingo Kobayashi: Piano, synthesizer
- Eiji Shimamura: Drums
- Tsuyoshi Kon: guitar
- Kenji Takamizu: bass
- Wornell Jones: chorus
- J.T. Jamm: chorus

== Accolades ==
=== Japan Record Awards ===
Year	Nominee / work	Award	Result
1991	"Ai wa Katsu"	Japan Record Award – Pop/Rock	Won
1991	"Ai wa Katsu"	Gold Disc Prize – Pop/Rock	Won

=== Japan Gold Disc Awards ===
Year	Nominee / work	Award	Result
1991	"Ai wa Katsu"	The Best 5 Singles of Year	Won

== Charts ==
=== Weekly charts ===
Chart (1990–91)	Position
Japanese Oricon Chart	1

=== Year-end charts ===
Chart (1991)	Position
Japanese Oricon Singles Chart	3

=== All-time charts ===
Chart (1968–2010)	Position
Japanese Oricon Singles Chart	23

=== Certifications ===
Country	Provider	Title	Certification (sales thresholds)	Format	Date
Japan	RIAJ	"Ai wa Katsu"	2× Million	CD Single	1991

== See also ==
- 1990 in Japanese music

Preceded by "Odoru Pompokolin" (B.B.Queens)	Japan Record Award Grand Prix; 1991	Succeeded by "Kimi ga Iru Dake de" (Kome Kome Club)
