= Sekai ni Hitotsu Dake no Hana =

Single by SMAP

from the album SMAP 015/Drink! Smap!
- B-side: "Boku wa Kimi o Tsurete Yuku"
- Released: 5 March 2003
- Genre: J-pop
- Label: Victor Entertainment
- Songwriter: Noriyuki Makihara
- Producer: Noriyuki Makihara

SMAP singles chronology
"Freebird" (2002)	"Sekai ni Hitotsu Dake no Hana" (2003)	"Tomodachi e (Say What You Will)" (2005)

"Sekai ni Hitotsu Dake no Hana" (世界に一つだけの花; "The One and Only Flower in the World") is a song recorded by Japanese boy band SMAP. The Noriyuki Makihara composed song was released as a single in 2003 and sold more than 2.57 million copies, becoming the third best-selling single in Japan in Oricon history. Along with Hikaru Utada's "Colors", it was one of the only two singles to sell over a million copies in 2003, a year that saw CD sales declining due to the Japanese economic slump.

The single made it to the top of the Oricon 2003 Yearly singles chart. As of December 2016 it is the third best-selling single in Japan, with over 3 million copies sold. This song became popular in karaoke.

== Track list ==
12cm single
No.	Title	Lyrics	Music	Arranger	Length
1.	"Sekai ni Hitotsu Dake no Hana"	Noriyuki Makihara	N. Makihara	N. Makihara	4:40
2.	"Boku wa Kimi o Tsurete Yuku" (僕は君を連れてゆく)	Tetsuo Kudō	Takashi Tsushimi	T. Tsushimi	4:39
3.	"Sekai ni Hitotsu Dake no Hana (Music Track)"	N. Makihara	N. Makihara	N. Makihara	4:40
4.	"Boku wa Kimi o Tsurete Yuku (Music Track)"	T. Kudō	T. Tsushimi	T. Tsushimi	4:39
Total length:					17:58

== Charts and certifications ==
=== Charts ===
Chart (2003)	Peak position
Oricon Weekly Singles Chart	1
Chart (2011)	Peak position
Billboard Japan Hot 100	90
Chart (2016)	Peak position
Billboard Japan Hot 100	2

=== Certifications ===
Country	Provider	Certifications
Japan	RIAJ	3× Million
