= Oyoge! Taiyaki-kun =

Single by Masato Shimon
- B-side: "Ippon Demo Ninjin"
- Released: December 25, 1975
- Genre: Folk
- Label: Canyon Records
- Songwriter: Hiroo Takada

"Oyoge! Taiyaki-kun" (およげ! たいやきくん; lit. "Swim! Taiyaki") is a song by Japanese singer Masato Shimon, released by Canyon Records (now Pony Canyon) on December 25, 1975. The B-side "Ippon Demo Ninjin" was sung by Japanese folk singer Kenichi Nagira. However, the label claimed that the song was a children's song because the song was used in Japanese child television program Hirake Ponkikki. On the Oricon weekly chart, it became the first single to debut at number one in the Oricon history on January 5, 1976, and stayed there for 11 consecutive weeks. It surpassed the sales of "Onna no Michi" and eventually sold over 4.53 million copies, becoming the best-selling song in Japan. This record was certified by Guinness World Records. Despite the success, the company paid Shimon only 50,000 yen (approximately 170 dollars given the exchange rate at the time) as a guarantee. The single was re-released as a CD single that came with an anime DVD by Pony Canyon in 2008.

== See also ==
- 1975 in Japanese music
