= Aska (singer) =

Japanese singer-songwriter (born 1958)

- Born: 24 February 1958 (age 68)
- Relatives: Kaoru Miyazaki (Daughter)

Shigeaki Miyazaki (宮﨑 重明, Miyazaki Shigeaki; born February 24, 1958), known professionally as Aska, is a Japanese singer-songwriter. He is best known for work as part of the music duo Chage and Aska. As a composer, he wrote most of the duo's hit songs, including "Morning Moon", "Love Song", "Say Yes", and "Meguriai". He has also written for many other singers and groups, including Hikaru Genji. He was formerly known as Ryo Aska or Ryō Asuka (飛鳥 涼, Asuka Ryō).

== Biography ==
Aska was born on February 24, 1958, in Ono, Onojō, Fukuoka.

He began a solo career in 1987, and was highly successful in the early 1990s. His most well-known song as a solo singer is "Hajimari wa Itsumo Ame" (The Start Is Always Rain), which was a single from his second solo album. The song reached No. 2 on oricon and sold over 1,160,000 copies. The song led him to prominence across East Asia.

He was arrested in May 2014 for possession of an illegal stimulant. On September 12, 2014, he was sentenced to three years in prison suspended for four years. He restarted his career in 2017.

In 2019, Aska announced he would leave Chage and Aska.

== Stage name origin ==
Initially, it was thought that his stage name was derived from the Ryo Asuka character of the Devilman manga series by Go Nagai. Aska later denied this, explaining that his name was derived from "Asuka", the name of female radio DJ in Fukuoka on whom he had a crush in college. When he thought about his stage name, he used Aska to get back at the DJ. At first, the English notation of his name was Ryo Asuka, but this was often mispronounced, so Asuka was changed to Aska.

== Discography ==
=== Singles ===
- "My Mr. Lonely Heart" / "Otona ja Nakute ii" (1987, #16)
- "Midnight 2 Call"/ "Yume Haruka" (1988, #22)
- "Hajimari wa Itsumo Ame"/"Kimi ga Ai o Katare" (1991, #2)
- "Seiten o Homerunara Yugure o Mate" / "Only Lonely" / "Seiten o Homerunara Yugure o Mate (Original Karaoke)" (1995, #1)
- "Every Day of Your Life (Richard Marx and Aska)" / "Can't Help Falling in Love (Marx)" / "Take It to the Limit (Marx and Randy Meisner)" (1997)
- "ID" / "Kaze no Inryoku" (1997, #4)
- "One" / "Chakuchiten" / "Konnafuuni" (1997, #19)
- "Girl" / "Hana wa Saitaka" (1998, #6)
- "good time" / "judge by myself" (2000, #14)
- "Kokoro ni Hana no Saku Hou e" (2003, #5)
- "UNI-VERSE" / "Shougen Ni Sofa Wo Oite (Live Ver.)" / "Tsuki Ga Chikazukeba Sukoshi Ha Mashidaro (Live Ver.)" / "Please (Live Ver.)" (2008)
- "Anataga Nakukotowanai" / "L&R" (2009)
- "Utani Naritai / Breath of Bless -Subeteno Athlete Tachi e" (2019)
- "Waratte Arukou yo" (2021)
- "PRIDE" (2021)
- "地球という名の都" from Sawano Hiroyuki's fifth album called "V" (2023)

=== Studio albums ===
- Scene (1988, #3)
- Scene II (1991, #1)
- Never End (1995, #1)
- One (1997, #4)
- Kicks (1998, #4)
- Scene III (2005, #6)
- SCRAMBLE(2012, #4)
- Too many people(2017, #7)
- Black & White(2017, #6)
- Breath of Bless(2020, #14)
- Wonderful world(2022, #7)

=== Cover album ===
- Standard (2009)
- 12 (2010)
- Kimi no Shiranai Kimi no Uta (2010)
- Bookend (ja) (2011)
- Boku ni Dekirukoto (2013)

=== Compilation album ===
- Aska the Best (1999, #8)
- Scene I & II (2005, #32)
- Scene of Scene: Selected 6 Songs from Scene I, II, III (2006, #23)
- We are the Fellows (2018, #28)
- Made in ASKA (2018, #7)
- SCENE -Remix ver.- (2018, #42)
- SCENE II -Remix ver.- (2018, #47)

=== Videography ===
- good time (2000)
- My Game Is ASKA Concert tour 05>>06 (2006)
- ASKA SYMPHONIC CONCERT TOUR 2008 "SCENE" (2009)
- ASKA WALK Concert tour 2009 (2009)
- The Melody You Heard That Night Shouwa Ga Miteita Christmas (2010)
- Concert Tour 10>>11 Faces (2011)
- ASKA CONCERT 2012 Shouwa Ga Miteita Christmas!? Prelude to The Bookend(2012)
- Too many people Music Video + Iroiro (2017)
- Black&White Music Video (2018)
- ASKA PREMIUM SYMPHONIC CONCERT 2018 -THE PRIDE- (2019)
- ASKA CONCERT TOUR 2019 Made in ASKA – 40 Nen no Arittake – in Nippon Budokan (2019)
- ASKA premium ensemble concert -higher ground- 2019>>2020 (2020)
- ASKA CONCERT TOUR 12>>13 ROCKET (2021)
- ASKA premium concert tour -higher ground- encore stage 2022 (2022)

== Contributions for other artists ==
=== Songwriting ===
- Sanma Akashiya – "Teku Teku"
- Yoko Oginome – "Dear -Cobalt no Kanata e" (music only)
- Yūji Oda – "Sonna Mon darou"
- Yuki Katsuragi – "Bohemian" (lyrics only), "Midori no Bara" (lyrics only)
- Shizuka Kudo – "Step" (music only)., "Yume" (music only)
- Yuki Kuroda – "Kaze Fuiteru", "cry"
- Noriko Sakai – "Ichioku no Smile -Please your smile-" (music only), "Fight!", "Madogiwa no Koihikou", "Listen to Me"
- Kojiro Shimizu – "Crescent Mystery" (music only), "Love Affair"
- Judy Ongg – "Tatta Hitotsu no Tonight" (music only)
- Shonentai – "Futari", "My Girl"
- Masayuki Suzuki – "No Credit"
- S.E.N.S. – "Arukutabi ni Sukitoru Kaze" (music only) "Otonatachi no Niwa" (co-songwriting), "Asuka" (co-songwriting)
- Mariko Takahashi – "Izayoi", "Tokai no Sora"
- Naomi Chiaki – "Image", "Tsutawarimasuka"
- Teresa Teng – "Imademo...", "Elegy"
- Saburō Tokitō – "Kimi ga Ai o Katare", "Shiroi Enogu to Orchestra"
- Hideaki Tokunaga – "Kokoro no Ball"
- Yuri Nakae – "Hana o Kudasai"
- Masatoshi Nakamura – "Kaze no Sumu Machi"
- Hiroko Yakushimaru – "Ame ni Sarawarete", "Tomatta Tokei"
- Miho Nakayama – "Honkidemo...", "Midnight Taxi"
- Hikaru Genji – "A Ki Su To Ze Ne Ko", "Itsuka Kitto...". "Glass no Judai", "Graduation" (lyrics only), "Long Run" (lyrics only), "Koya no Megalopolis", "The Windy", "Starlight", "Paradise Ginga", "Hurry Up", "Please", "Little Birthday", "Rainy Girl"
- Multi Max – "I Miss You" (music only), "Leven It to the Future" (lyrics only)
- Akina Nakamori – "Yokan", "Nocturne", "Yume no Fuchi" (lyrics only)
- Yoko Minamino – "Film no Mukougawa", "Maria"
- Miho Morikawa – "Onna ni Naare"
- Marina Watanabe – "Hoshi ni Kizuite"
- Na Ying – "相見不如懷念 I'd Rather Miss You" (music only)
- Emil Chau – "讓我歡喜讓我憂 You Make Me Happy And Sad" (music only)
- Sally Yeh – "離開情人的日子 The Day Lovers Split" (music only)
- Leon Lai – "两心知 Both Hearts Know" (music only)
- Hiroyuki Sawano – "地球という名の都" (lit. "A City Called Earth") (lyrics only)
- Fei Yu-ching – "你是我永遠的鄉愁 You're My Forever Nostalgia" (music only)
- Scott Grimes – "Show Me the Way to Your Heart" (music only)
