= Ayumi Shigemori =

Japanese actress and pop star

Ayumi Shigemori 茂森あゆみ
- Born: 1971 (age 54–55); Kumamoto, Japan

Ayumi Shigemori (茂森 あゆみ, Shigemori Ayumi; born in 1971, in Kumamoto) is a Japanese actress and pop star. She sang on the major J-pop hit "Dango 3 Kyodai" (1999) with her children's television co-host Kentaro Hayami.

== Appearances ==
- You Gotta Quintet
- Cheap Love
