= Kimi ga Iru Dake de =

Single by Kome Kome Club

from the album Octave
- B-side: "Aishiteru"
- Released: May 4, 1992
- Genre: J-pop
- Length: 4:40
- Songwriter(s): Kome Kome Club
- Producer(s): Kome Kome Club

Kome Kome Club singles chronology
"'Hitosuji ni Narenai'" (1991)	"Kimi ga Iru Dake de" (1992)	"'Orion'" (1992)

Kimi ga Iru Dake de (君がいるだけで, lit. "Just by you being here") is a Japanese song by Kome Kome Club released on May 4, 1992. On the Japanese Oricon chart, it sold 924,780 copies in one week and debuted at the number-one position. It held the top rank in total of six weeks. It sold over 2.89 million copies and is the top-selling J-Pop single of the 1990s and sixth best-selling song in Japan since 1968, when the official Oricon sales records start. The song was the best promotion single of their new album Octave, which sold around two million copies. The song won the grand prix award at the 34th Japan Record Awards of pop and rock genre.

It was used for the theme song of the drama Sugao no Mama de, which starred 80's idol singers Narumi Yasuda and Akina Nakamori.

== See also ==
- List of best-selling singles in Japan

Preceded by "Ai wa Katsu" (Kan)	Japan Record Award Grand Prix; 1992	Succeeded by "Mugonzaka" (Kaori Kozai)
