= Say Yes (Chage and Aska song) =

Single by Chage and Aska

from the album Tree
- B-side: "Kokuhaku"
- Released: 1991
- Genre: J-pop
- Length: 4:46
- Label: Pony Canyon
- Songwriter: Ryo Aska

Chage and Aska singles chronology
"'Taiyou to Hokori no Naka de'" (1991)	"Say Yes" (1991)	"'Boku ha Kono Me de Uso wo Tsuku'" (1991)

Music video
- Say Yes on YouTube

"Say Yes" is a Japanese single by Chage and Aska, released by Pony Canyon in 1991. The song was used as a theme of the Japanese television drama 101 kaime no Propose (101回目のプロポーズ). It was regarded as a wedding song.

On the Japanese Oricon weekly single charts, "Say Yes" spent 13 consecutive weeks at the number-one position. The single became the best-selling song for the duo. It sold over 2.82 million copies and is the sixth best-selling single in Oricon charts history.

== Chart ==
Weekly

Chart (1984)	Peak position	Appearances (Weeks)
Japanese Singles Chart	1	39

== Cover versions ==
In 1992, both Hong Kong singer Raymond Choi and Chicago band's Jason Scheff covered this song in Cantonese and English respectively. Debbie Gibson also covered the song in English differently, in her 2010 Japan-only release Ms. Vocalist. The song also has a Maldivian cover by Maldivian singer Ali Rameez, made for the hit film Amaanaaiy in 1998.

== See also ==
- List of best-selling singles in Japan
