= Love Story wa Totsuzen ni =

Song by Kazumasa Oda

from the album Oh! Yeah!
- Language: Japanese
- A-side: "Oh! Yeah!"
- Released: February 6, 1991
- Genre: Pop, J-pop
- Label: Little Tokyo/Funhouse
- Songwriter: Kazumasa Oda
- Composer: Kazumasa Oda
- Producer: Kazumasa Oda

"Love Story wa Totsuzen ni' (ラブ・ストーリーは突然に, lit. Sudden Love Story) is a song by Japanese singer Kazumasa Oda. The song, his best-known work, is featured as the B-side on the single "Oh! Yeah! / Love Story wa Totsuzen ni", the ninth-best-selling Japanese single since 1968, selling approximately 2.7 million copies to date.

== History ==
"Love Story wa Totsuzen ni" was used as the theme song for the popular Fuji TV drama Tokyo Love Story. The song was written, composed, arranged and produced by Oda himself.

The song has since been featured on three of Oda's albums: Oh! Yeah! (1991), Tsutaetai Koto ga arun da (伝えたいことがあるんだ (There's Something I Want to Tell You), 1997) and Jiko Best (自己ベスト (Self Best), 2002).

In 2005, fourteen years after the song was released, NHK conducted a survey titled "Favourite Songs: Kōhaku Survey for Everyone" (スキウタ〜紅白みんなでアンケート〜). "Love Story wa Totsuzen ni" was ranked at number forty-four out of one hundred male artists.

Oda performed the song during the 1991 broadcast of the FNS Music Festival, his first solo TV performance since embarking on his solo career. He also performed the song with KinKi Kids on a special edition of the variety programme "Love Love Aishiteru" in 2000.

== Sales ==
The single reached number one on the weekly Japanese music chart, Oricon, charting for forty-four weeks. It was also the best-selling single of 1991, selling 2.54 million copies and beating the number-two seller by just under 40,000 copies.

== Covers ==
"Love Story wa Totsuzen ni" has been covered by many artists, both in Asia and overseas.

Asian covers

- Tatsuo Kamon
- Sumire Uesaka
- Twelve Girls Band (instrumental)
- Kyōgo Kawaguchi
- Anri
- Kohmi Hirose
- Winnie Hsin (Mandarin as 愛情故事, lit. Love Story)
- Hiromi Setoguchi
- Ekin Cheng (Cantonese)
- Chris Hart
- Yuya Matsushita
- DEPAPEKO (Depapepe × Kotaro Oshio)
- Lyrical Lily (D4DJ)

English-language covers

- Bobby Kimball
- Ned Doheny
- Rita Coolidge (Dancing with an Angel)
- Jun'ichi Kanemaru
- Debbie Gibson (Ms. Vocalist)
- BENI
- Kishi Bashi (English and Japanese)

== Single track-listing ==
| No. | Title | Length |
|---|---|---|
| 1. | "Oh! Yeah!" |
| 2. | "Love Story wa Totsuzen ni" |
