= Kan (musician) =

Japanese singer-songwriter (1962–2023)

KAN
- Born: Kan Kimura (木村 和); September 24, 1962; Fukuoka, Fukuoka, Japan
- Died: November 12, 2023 (aged 61)
- Genres: Pop; pop rock; new wave
- Occupations: composer; lyricist; singer
- Instruments: Vocal; keyboard
- Years active: 1983–20??
- Labels: Polydor Japan; Warner Music Japan; BMG Funhouse; zetima
- Website: www.kimurakan.com

Kan Kimura (木村 和, Kimura Kan; September 24, 1962 – November 12, 2023), known by his stage name Kan (commonly stylized as KAN), was a Japanese singer-songwriter.

In 1983, he joined his first band, which was called Annette, before going solo in 1984. Kan wrote the background music for a 1986 film directed by Nobuhiko Obayashi, and started his major recording career the following year. He is best known for the chart-topping hit "Ai wa Katsu", released as a single in 1990. It sold over 2 million copies and won the 33rd Japan Record Award, bringing the artist into prominence. Subsequently, he spawned five top-ten singles and four top-ten albums on the Japanese record chart during the first half of the 1990s.

As of 2010, Kan had released 33 singles and 15 studio albums. According to the Oricon, he sold over 4.6 million copies of albums and singles in his home country.

Kan died of Meckel's diverticulum cancer on November 12, 2023, at the age of 61.

== Discography ==
=== Singles ===
Year	Single	Details	Peak chart positions
Year	Single	Details	JPN
1987	"TV no Naka ni" (テレビの中に)	Released: April 25, 1987; B-Side: "Celluloid City mo Hi ga Kurete" (セルロイドシティも日が暮れて)	—
1987	"Bracket"	Released: October 25, 1987; B-Side: "Boku no Genuine Kiss" (僕のGENUINE KISS)	—
1988	"Daijōbu I'm All Right" (だいじょうぶI'M ALL RIGHT)	Released: June 25, 1988; B-Side: "France ni Tsuita Hi" (フランスについた日)	—
1988	"Over You"	Released: November 25, 1988; B-Side: "Never Leave"	—
1989	"Tokyo Life" (東京ライフ)	Released: May 1, 1989; B-Side: "Kimi kara Me ga Hanasenai" (君から目がはなせない)	—
1989	"Regrets"	Released: September 1, 1989; B-Side: "All I Want Is You"	—
1990	"Kenzen Anzen Kōseinen" (健全 安全 好青年)	Released: May 25, 1990; B-Side: "Seishun Kokudō 202" (青春国道202)	—
1990	"Ai wa Katsu" (愛は勝つ)	Released: September 1, 1990; B-Side: "Soredemo Furarete shimau Yatsu" (それでもふられてしまう男)	1
1991	"In the Name of Love"	Released: April 25, 1991; B-Side: "Tokidoki Kumo to Hanashi o Shiyō" (ときどき雲と話をしよう)	5
1991	"Propose"	Released: July 11, 1991; B-Side: "Koi suru Kimochi" (恋する気持ち)	5
1992	"Koppa Mijikai Koi" (こっぱみじかい恋)	Released: January 21, 1992; B-Side: "Tokyo Life" (New Recording)	9
1992	"Iezu no I Love You" (言えずのI LOVE YOU)	Released: March 25, 1992; B-Side: "Day by Day"	13
1992	"Shinu made Kimi o Hanasanai" (死ぬまで君を離さない)	Released: October 22, 1992; B-Side: "KAN no Christmas Song" (KANのChristmas Song)	18
1993	"Marui Oshiri ga Yurusenai" (まるいお尻が許せない)	Released: January 21, 1993; B-Side: "Long Vacation"	15
1993	"Mayumi" (まゆみ)	Released: April 21, 1993; B-Side: "France ni Tsuita Hi" (フランスについた日) (New Recording)	17
1993	"Itsumo Majime ni Kimi no Koto" (いつもまじめに君のこと)	Released: November 17, 1993; B-Side: "Hayaku Futtekure" (はやくふってくれ)	32
1994	"Sunshine of My Heart"	Released: November 26, 1994; B-Side: "Kimitachi wa Umakuiku" (君たちはうまく行く)	47
1995	"Subete no Kanashimi ni Sayonara Suru Tame ni" (すべての悲しみにさよならするために)	Released: January 25, 1995; B-Side: "Rival"	42
1995	"Tokyo ni Koi" (東京に来い)	Released: May 10, 1995; B-Side: "Nerima Bijin" (練馬美人)	59
1996	"Man"	Released: May 27, 1996; B-Side: "Zoku Rival" (続ライバル)	50
1996	"Namida no Yuyake" (涙の夕焼け)	Released: August 26, 1996; B-Side: "Permanent Dragon"	78
1997	"Songwriter"	Released: August 27, 1997; B-Side: "Kimi o Matsu" (君を待つ)	63
1997	"Dora Dora Drive Daisakusen" (ドラ・ドラ・ドライブ大作戦)	Released: December 25, 1997; B-Side: "Kekkon Shinai Futari" (結婚しない二人) (Live)	86
1998	"Saint Petersburg" (サンクト・ペテルグルブ～ダジャレ男の悲しきひとり旅, Dajare Otoko no Kanashiki Hitoritabi)	Released: February 5, 1998; B-Side: "Kimi o Matsu" (君を待つ)	86
1998	"Eigo de Gomen" (英語でゴメン)	Released: September 25, 1998; B-Side: "Saint Petersburg" (Live)	73
1999	"Happy Time, Happy Song"	Released: February 5, 1999; B-Sides: "Venus" (女神, Megami)	68
1999	"Kotoshi mo Koshite Futari de Christmas o Iwau" (今年もこうして二人でクリスマスを祝う)	Released: November 25, 1999; B-Sides: "Angel" (天使, Tenshi), "Labyrinth" (迷宮, Meikyu)	89
2001	"Close to Me"	Released: January 24, 2001; B-Sides: "Kohitsuji" (子羊), "Rock Shiren no Koi" (ロック試練の恋)	68
2001	"Superfaker"	Released: September 26, 2001; B-Sides: "Karasu" (カラス), "Tokidoki Kumo to Hanashi o Shiyō" (ときどき雲と話をしよう)	89
2006	"Curry Rice" (カレーライス)	Released: February 22, 2006; B-Side: "I Love You"	54
2006	"Sekai de Ichiban Suki na Hito" (世界でいちばん好きな人)	Released: November 29, 2006; B-Sides: "Cherry", "Tokyo Nettai Squeeze" (東京熱帯SQUEEZE)	56
2010	"Yokereba Issho ni" (よければ一緒に)	Released: February 10, 2010; B-Sides: "Bye Bye Bye"	56
2011	"Listen to the Music"	Released: December 7, 2011; B-Side: "Christmas Song"	70
2020	"Pop Music"	Released: February 26, 2020; B-side: "KAN's Christmas Song"	32

=== Albums ===
Studio albums

Year	Details	Peak chart positions
Year	Details	JPN
1987	Terebi no Naka ni (テレビの中に): Released: April 25, 1987; Label: Polydor	—
1987	No-No-Yesman: Released: October 25, 1987; Label: Polydor	—
1988	Girl to Love: Released: June 25, 1988; Label: Polydor	86
1989	Happy Title: Kōfuku Senshuken (HAPPY TITLE-幸福選手権): Released: June 21, 1989; Label: Polydor	89
1990	Yakyū Senshu ga Yume datta (野球選手が夢だった): Released: July 25, 1990; Label: Polydor	2
1991	Yukkuri Furo ni Tsukaritai (ゆっくり風呂につかりたい): Released: May 22, 1991; Label: Polydor	2
1993	Tokyoman: Released: February 25, 1993; Label: Polydor	3
1993	Firm Wills of a Timid Man (弱い男の固い意志, Yowai Otoko no Katai Ishi): Released: December 10, 1993; Label: Polydor	13
1994	Shinonome (東雲): Released: November 26, 1994; Label: Polydor	21
1996	Man: Released: May 27, 1996; Label: Polydor	12
1998	Tigersongwriter: Released: March 5, 1998; Label: Warner Music Japan	24
1999	Kremlinman: Released: April 21, 1999; Label: Warner Music Japan	31
2001	Gleam and Squeeze: Released: September 26, 2001; Label: BMG Funhouse	49
2006	Haruka naru Mawarimichi no Mukou de (遥かなるまわり道の向こうで): Released: August 30, 2006; Label: Up-Front Works/zetima	27
2010	Kanchigai mo Hanahadashii Watashi no Jinsei (カンチガイもハナハダしい私の人生): Released: March 10, 2010; Label: Up-Front Works/zetima	24

Live albums

Year	Details	Peak chart positions
Year	Details	JPN
2008	Live Hikiatari-Battari #7: Ultra Tabun (LIVE 弾き語りばったり No. 7 〜ウルトラタブン〜 全会場から全曲収録): Released: November 19, 2008; Label: zetima	42

Compilation albums

Year	Details	Peak chart positions
Year	Details	JPN
1992	Mezurashii Jinsei (めずらしい人生): Released: February 28, 1992; Label: Polydor	4
1997	The Best Singles First Decade: Released: September 3, 1997; Label: Polydor/Mercury	31
1999	Treasure Collection: Released: June 30, 1999; Label: PolyGram	—
2004	Golden Best: Released: February 25, 2004; Label: Universal Japan	—
2005	KAN: Best 10: Released: November 9, 2005; Label: Universal	—
2007	Ideas: The Very Best of KAN: Released: November 28, 2007; Label: Up-Front Works/zetima	38
2010	Songs out of Bounds: Released: October 27, 2010; Label: Up-Front Works/zetima	78
