= Chage and Aska =

Japanese music duo

- Origin: Fukuoka, Japan
- Genres: Folk rock; soft rock
- Years active: 1979–2009, 2013–2019
- Labels: Warner Pioneer (1979–1985); Pony Canyon (1985–1997); Toshiba-EMI (1997–2000); Yamaha Music Communications (2000–2009); Universal Music (2001–2009)
- Past members: Chage – lead vocals, backing vocals, guitar; Aska – lead vocals, backing vocals, guitar, harmonica
- Website: www.chage-aska.net

Chage and Aska (チャゲ&飛鳥) were a Japanese popular music duo composed of male singer-songwriters from Fukuoka Prefecture: Chage (チャゲ; born January 6, 1958) and Aska (飛鳥涼, Ryo Aska; born February 24, 1958). To date they have sold over 31 million albums and singles in Japan.

== History ==
They were formed in the late 1970s at the suggestion of the A&R division of the Yamaha Music Foundation. After the hit single "万里の河 (Banri no Kawa)" in 1980, they produced several hits irregularly throughout the 1980s. From 1989 to 1997, Chage had a parallel project called MULTIMAX, a band he formed with guitarist and multi-instrumental master Keisuke Murakami (former The Alpha member) and singer Hiromi Asai. They released seven singles, seven albums, two videos and did some tours. Aska has conducted a solo career since 1987.

Thanks to Aska's hit solo single "はじまりはいつも雨 (Hajimari wa Itsumo Ame)" in 1991 and several powerful tieups with TV programs, their popularity peaked during the first half of the 1990s. In those days, they released five million-selling hits: "Say Yes" and "if", "YAH YAH YAH/夢の番人 (YAH YAH YAH/Yume no Bannin)", "HEART/NATURAL/On Your Mark", "めぐり逢い (Meguriai)". "Say Yes" and "YAH YAH YAH" each sold over two million copies. "Say Yes", released in 1991, is the sixth best-selling single in Japanese Oricon charts history. "Say Yes" was the opening theme song for 101回目のプロポーズ (101st Proposal), a 1991 TV drama. Their album Tree has been certified by the RIAJ for sales of 3 million copies. Their two subsequent albums, Guys (1992) and Red Hill (1993), were certified for a million each.

Chage and Aska released a song, "Something There", for the soundtrack of Street Fighter in 1994. That same year the duo approached Studio Ghibli for the creation of an animated promotional music video for one of their songs, On Your Mark. The collaboration resulted in the creation of the short film On Your Mark, which has been used by the duo and had a theatrical release, with the film Whisper of the Heart, in 1995.

They have attempted to spread their market worldwide in 1990s, especially to the United Kingdom. EMI released a compilation tribute album (One Voice the Songs of Chage & Aska) by Western artists (Maxi Priest featuring Shaggy, Lisa Stansfield, Chaka Khan, Michael Hutchence of INXS, Alejandro Sanz, Cathy Dennis, Apache Indian, Boy George, Richard Marx, Londonbeat, Marianne Faithfull, and Wendy Matthews). They made live appearances in MTV concerts in 1996.

They decided to separate and go solo in 1996. In 1997, Aska's first solo concert at Shanghai concluded with Chage appearing on stage. When the duo became active again in 1999, they sometimes performed together but also continued with their solo careers.

They released two singles "Man and Woman" and "Here & There" on January 10, 2007. "Man and Woman" and "Here & There" were ranked at number two and number three respectively on the Oricon weekly single charts.

Chage and Aska officially announced the band's "indefinite suspension" on January 30, 2009, to concentrate on their solo work.

In 2013, Chage and Aska decided to revive their activities, after a four-year break.

In 2014, Aska and his girlfriend were caught with drugs and were arrested. News of his arrest became controversial around Japan. He was convicted and given a 3-year suspended sentence.

In 2019, Aska has announced withdrawal from the duo.

== Discography ==
=== Studio albums ===
- Kazemai (1980)
- Neppū(1981)
- Tasogare no Kishi (1982)
- Chage and Asuka: 21 Seiki (1983)
- Inside (1984)
- Z=One (1985)
- Turning Point (1986)
- Mix Blood (1986)
- Mr.Asia (1987)
- Rhapsody (1988)
- Energy (1988)
- Pride (1989)
- See Ya (1990)
- Tree (1991)
- Guys (1992)
- Red Hill (1993)
- Code Name 1 Brother Sun (1995)
- Code Name 2 Sister Moon (1996)
- No Doubt (1999)
- Not at All (2001)
- Double (2007)

=== Compilation albums ===
- Standing Ovation (1985)
- Super Best (1987)
- The Story of Ballad (1990)
- Super Best II (1992)
- Yin & Yang (1994)
- Chage & Aska Very Best Roll Over 20th (1999)
- The Story of Ballad II (2004)
- Nothing But C&A (2009)

== See also ==
- List of best-selling music artists in Japan
- World Music Awards
- MTV Unplugged
