= Kome Kome Club =

Japanese musical group

- Origin: Japan
- Genres: Pop rock; psychedelic soul; new wave; funk rock; rakugo
- Years active: 1982–1997; 2006–present
- Label: Sony
- Members: Carl Smoky Ishii; James Onoda; Bon; Be; Flash Kaneko; Mari; Minako; Ryo-J; Joplin Tokunoh
- Website: http://www.komekomeclub.net/

YouTube information
- Channel: 米米CLUB Official YouTube Channel
- Years active: 2021 -
- Subscribers: 99.2 thousand
- Views: 75.2 million
- Last updated: August 5th, 2026

Kome Kome Club (米米CLUB, Kome Kome Kurabu) is a Japanese pop rock band formed in 1982 which achieved commercial success by blending soul and funk musical styles. They also use the style of rakugo.

== History ==
=== 1982–1997: Commercial success ===
Kome Kome Club was founded in 1982 by vocalist Tatsuya Ishii (sometimes credited as "Carl Smoky Ishiii") and fellow members. They released their debut single and album in October 1985. In 1990, "Roman Hikō" became a hit song. In 1992, "Kimi ga Iru Dake de" topped the Oricon chart, remaining in the charts for 33 weeks. It was the fifth best-selling song in Japan since Oricon's establishment, and the second best-selling J-Pop single, slightly behind Southern All Stars' "TSUNAMI", (released in January 2000). "Kimi ga Iru Dake de" was written around the marriage of band members Minako (also Ishii's sister) and Kaneko, the saxophone/keyboardist.

Drummer Ryo-J and guitarist Joplin Tokunoh parted ways with the band in 1995. Ishii continued activities with the band until dissolving it in March 1997.

=== 2006–present: Reunion ===
With the two members returning, the band reformed in the middle of 2006 for a series of concerts as well as a few new recordings, including "Well Come 2" [sic], which spurred a video where the band members were depicted as toys (complete with enlarged doll-like heads, UPC bar codes and one, "James" Onoda Yasuhide bursting out of his "box"). The video also gives a nod to all of its members by having a screen shot with their name and them playing in the scene, this includes members of Big Horns Bee and Sue Cream Sue. It is a part of Sony Music Japan. Sony has frequently had appearances of the "Well Come 2" video on various streaming websites pulled while leaving other videos from the same DVD online.

A combined CD/DVD release featured a parody of the "hentai" (aka "racy') videos where the two dancers (Minako and Mari, also known as "Sue Cream Sue") dance to songs of Kome Kome in various states of dress and undress (and strange costumes like animals). However, this being 20 years later, their costumes are not as skimpy as the ones in their famed "Costume Dance" videos during Kome Kome's heyday. They do poke a bit of fun with it and guitarist, Be, narrates over the slow-motion action when their skirts fly up a little.

"Well Come 2" became a Top 10 hit on the Oricon charts. On October 22, 2006, they announced that they completely revoked their breakup. In September 2007, their new studio album komedia.jp was released. On December 31, 2007, they performed in the 58th NHK Kōhaku Uta Gassen.

== Members ==
=== Current members ===
- Carl Smoky Ishii (カールスモーキー石井, Kāru Sumōkī Ishii; Real name: Tatsuya Ishii (石井 竜也, Ishii Tatsuya)) born 22 September 1959 (1985-1997, 2006-) - vocal
- James Onoda (ジェームス小野田, Jēmusu Onoda; Real name: Yasuhide Onoda (小野田 安秀, Onoda Yasuhide)) born 8 November 1959 (1985-1997, 2006-) - vocal, chorus
- BON (ボン, BON; Real name: Kensaku Ookubo (大久保 謙作, Ōkubo Kensaku)) born 5 March 1960 (1985-1997, 2006-) - bass
- BE (ベー, Bē; Real name: Naoki Hayashibe (林部直樹, Hayashibe Naoki)) born 29 July 1965 (1985-1997, 2006-) - guitar
- Flash Kaneko (フラッシュ金子, Furasshu Kaneko; Real name: Takahiro Kaneko (金子隆博, Kaneko Takahiro)) born 22 March 1964 (1985-1997, 2006-) - Saxophone, Keyboards, Flute
- Minako (ミナコ, Minako; Real name: Minako Kaneko (金子 美奈子, Kaneko Minako)) born 18 December 1961 (1985-1997, 2006-) - Vocal, Dance (younger sister of Ishii and wife of Kaneko)
- Mari (マリ, Mari; Real name: Mari Amagaya (天ヶ谷真利, Amagaya Mari)) born 20 November 1966 (1985-1996, 2006-) - Vocal, Dance, Percussion
- RYO-J (リョージェイ, Ryōjei; Real name: Ryouji Sakaguchi (坂口良治, Sakaguchi Ryōji)) born 25 April 1959 (1985-1995, 2006-) - Drums
- Joplin Tokunoh (ジョプリン得能, Jopurin Tokunō; Real name: Ritsurou Tokunou (得能律郎, Tokunō ritsurō)) born 10 August 1959 (1985-1995, 2006-) - guitar

==== Live-band support members ====
- Mataro (マタロー, Matarō; Real name: Matarou Misawa (三沢またろう, Misawa Matarō)) born 23 October 1960 (1990-1997, 2006-) - Percussion, Chorus
- Machiko (マチコ, Machiko; born 23 December) (1991-1997, 2006-) - chorus
- Tequila Masaharu (テキーラまさはる, Tekīra Masaharu; born 17 December 1985) (2013-) - dance, MC, subvocal

=== Former members ===
- Toshi: Drums
- Juliano Katsumata: Keyboards
- Juliano Narabe: Keyboards
- Kohtaro: Dance
- Shinji: Dance
- SCS (Sue Cream Sue)
- B.H.B. (Big Horns Bee)
- G.I. Gyo: Trumpet
- Himarayan Shimogami: Trumpet
- Kawai Wakaba: Trombone, saxophone
- Orita Nobotta: Saxophone, flute
- Fussy Kobayashi: Trumpet
- Megumi Hakata: Guitar
- Lala Okaku: Guitar
- Maru: Percussion
- Taka: Vibraslap
- Bohz: Percussion
- Andes Murata: Trombone
- Rocky Tada: Trumpet
- Beauty Kondo: Saxophone
- Satomi: Dance

== Discography ==
=== Albums ===
==== Studio albums ====
Title	Album details	Peak chart positions
Title	Album details	JPN Oricon
Shari Sharism (シャリ・シャリズム)	Released: 21 October 1985; Label: CBS Sony; Formats: LP, cassette, CD, Blu-spec CD2+DVD, digital download, streaming	35
E・B・I・S	Released: 10 October 1986; Label: CBS Sony; Formats: LP, cassette, CD, Blu-spec CD2+DVD, digital download, streaming	3
Komeguny	Released: 21 October 1987; Label: CBS Sony; Formats: LP, cassette, CD, Blu-spec CD2+DVD, digital download, streaming	3
Go Funk	Released: 21 September 1988; Label: CBS Sony; Formats: LP, cassette, CD, Blu-spec CD2+DVD, digital download, streaming	1
5 1/2	Released: 11 November 1989; Label: CBS Sony; Formats: Cassette, CD, Blu-spec CD2+DVD, digital download, streaming	1
K2C	Released: 25 January 1991; Label: CBS Sony; Formats: Cassette, CD, Blu-spec CD2+DVD, digital download, streaming	1
Kome Kome Club (米米CLUB)	Released: 25 April 1991; Label: Sony Music; Formats: 2CD, Blu-spec CD2+DVD, digital download, streaming	1
Octave	Released: 25 June 1992; Label: Sony Music; Formats: Cassette, CD, Blu-spec CD2+DVD, digital download, streaming	1
Seimaiya (聖米夜)	Released: 10 December 1992; Label: Sony Music; Formats: CD, Blu-spec CD2+DVD, digital download, streaming	1
Phi	Released: 1 November 1993; Label: Sony Music; Formats: CD, cassette, MD, Blu-spec CD2+DVD, digital download, streaming	2
Phi II	Released: 10 December 1994; Label: Sony Music; Formats: CD, cassette, MD, Blu-spec CD2+DVD, digital download, streaming	3
Sorry Music Entertainment	Released: 23 November 1995; Label: Sony Music; Formats: 2CD, 2Blu-spec CD2+DVD, digital download, streaming	6
H20	Released: 21 March 1996; Label: Sony Music; Formats: CD, cassette, Blu-spec CD2+DVD, digital download, streaming	6
Pushed Rice	Released: 1 March 1997; Label: Sony Music; Formats: CD, Blu-spec CD2+DVD, digital download, streaming	2
komedia.jp	Released: 5 September 2007; Label: Sony Music; Formats: CD, CD+DVD, Blu-spec CD2+DVD, digital download, streaming	10
Sunrice	Released: 5 September 2009; Label: Sony Music; Formats: 2CD, CD, CD+DVD, Blu-spec CD2+DVD, digital download, streaming	8

==== Live albums ====
Title	Album details	Peak chart positions
Title	Album details	JPN Oricon
The Last Symposium: Kome Kome Club Last Live in Tokyo Dome (THE LAST SYMPOSIUM 〜米米CLUBラスト・ライブ in 東京ドーム〜)	Released: 8 August 1997; Label: Sony Music; Formats: 3CD	15

==== Soundtracks ====
Title	Album details
K2C Produce ICTL	Released: 10 June 1992; Label: Sony Music; Formats: CD
K2C Produce ICTL No.2	Released: 22 September 1992; Label: Sony Music; Formats: CD

==== Compilation albums ====
Title	Album details	Peak chart positions
Title	Album details	JPN Oricon
Singles	Released: 21 June 1987; Label: Sony Music Entertainment; Formats: CD, cassette	14
Decade	Released: 20 February 1995; Label: Sony Music; Formats: CD, cassette, MD	1
Harvest Singles 1985–1992	Released: 31 March 1997; Label: Sony Music; Formats: CD	4
Harvest Singles 1992–1997	Released: 1 June 1997; Label: Sony Music; Formats: CD	7
Star Box	Released: 30 January 1999; Label: Sony Music; Formats: CD	12
Star Box Extra Kome Kome Club	Released: 5 December 2001; Label: Sony Music; Formats: CD	—
Kome: Best of Best	Released: 21 October 2005; Label: Sony Music; Formats: 2CD, 2CD+DVD	8
Last Best	Released: 8 August 2017; Label: Sony Music; Formats: 4-Blu-spec CD2+Blu-ray, 3-Blu-spec CD2	11

=== Singles ===
Year	Album	Chart positions (JP)	Label
1985	"I Can Be"	67	CBS Sony
1986	"Shake Hip!"	54	CBS Sony
1986	"Gayu" (加油 (GAYU))	27	CBS Sony
1987	"Paradise"	19	CBS Sony
1987	"Sûre Danse"	19	CBS Sony
1988	"Yometsu Nami" (嫁津波)	42	CBS Sony
1988	"Kome Kome War"	5	CBS Sony
1988	"Time Stop"	25	CBS Sony
1989	"Funk Fujiyama"	2	CBS Sony
1990	"Roman Hikou" (浪漫飛行)	1	CBS Sony
1990	"Shake Hip! (Ishii Version)"	5	CBS Sony
1991	"Hitosuji ni Narenai" (ひとすじになれない)	3	Sony Music
1992	"Kimi ga Iru Dake de/Aishiteru" (君がいるだけで/愛してる)	1	Sony Music
1992	"Orion"	6	Sony Music
1993	"Toki no Tabiji: Rex no Theme" (ときの旅路 〜REXのテーマ〜)	3	Sony Music
1993	"Ai wa Fushigi sa" (愛はふしぎさ)	2	Sony Music
1994	"Abracadabra" (ア・ブラ・カダ・ブラ)	2	Sony Music
1994	"Oreiro ni Somare" (俺色にそまれ)	2	Sony Music
1994	"Oreiro ni Somare" (手紙)	6	Sony Music
1995	"Wonderful Sun Day" (ワンダブルSUNでぃ)	5	Sony Music
1995	"Just My Friend"	18	Sony Music
1995	"Subete wa Honto de Uso kamo ne" (すべてはホントでウソかもね)	7	Sony Music
1996	"Stylish Woman"	23	Sony Music
1997	"Special Love"	12	Sony Music
2006	"Well Come 2"	9	Sony Music
2006	"E-yo" (E-ヨ)	5	Sony Music
2006	"Kimi wo Hanasanai" (君を離さない)	9	Sony Music
2006	"Mata©Tana"	9	Sony Music
2007	"Goryaku" (御利益)	13	Sony Music
2007	"We Are Music"	17	Sony Music
2008	"Tsuyogari" (つ・よ・が・り)	7	Sony Music
2008	"080808"	18	Sony Music
2009	"Furimukanaide" (ふりむかないで)	14	Sony Music
2009	"Koi no Gamble" (恋のギャンブル)	12	Sony Music
2013	"Takarabune"	15	Sony Music
2013	"Don't Mind" (どんまい)	31	Sony Music
2021	"Ai wo Komete" (愛を米て)	20	Sony Music

==== DVD singles ====
Year	Album	Chart positions (JP)	Label
2012	"Tennen no Bi" (天然の美)	8	Sony Music

==== Digital singles ====
Year	Single	Reference
2017	"Kodomo na Otona/Uplight" (コドモ ナ オトナ / Uplight)	
2021	"Who?"	

== Videography ==
=== Video albums ===
No.	Release	Title	Format	Serial No.
1st	21 July 1989	Kome Kome Club Daizenshuu Vol.7 SHARISHARISM 7 Kick-Knock	VHS; LD; 8mm	48ZH-249; 48LH-249; CSWM-6156
2nd	10 August 1989	Kome Kome Club Daizenshuu Vol.8 SHARISHARISM 7 2much-2ist	VHS; LD; 8mm	48ZH-250; 48LH-250; CSWM-6157
3rd	21 August 1989	Kome Kome Club Daizenshuu Vol.9 SHARISHARISM 7 Co-Conga	VHS; LD; 8mm	48ZH-251; 48LH-251; CSWM-6158
4th	21 April 1990	Kome Kome Club Daizenshuu Vol.1 DEBUT SHARISHARISM	VHS; LD; 8mm β	CSVM-175; CSLM-175; CSWM-6175; CSUM-3175
5th	21 September 1990	Kome Kome Club Daizenshuu Vol.10 TiTi SHARISHARISM TARO	VHS; LD; 8mm β	CSVM-203; CSLM-203; CSWM-6203; CSUM-3203
6th	21 September 1990	Kome Kome Club Daizenshuu Vol.11 HaHa SHARISHARISM TARO	VHS; LD; 8mm β	CSVM-204; CSLM-204; CSWM-6204; CSUM-3204
7th	21 February 1991	Kome Kome Club Daizenshuu Vol.12 SHARISHARISM ART WORK ART UP	VHS; LD; 8mm β	CSVM-233; CSLM-233; CSWM-6233; CSUM-3233
8th	21 February 1991	Kome Kome Club Daizenshuu Vol.13 SHARISHARISM ART WORK WORK UP	VHS; LD; 8mm β	CSVM-234; CSLM-234; CSWM-6234; CSUM-3234
9th	1 August 1991	Kome Kome Club Daizenshuu Vol.14 ANTI SHARISHARISM	VHS; LD; 8mm β	CSVM-265; CSLM-265; CSWM-6265; CSUM-3265
10th	1 March 1992	Kome Kome Club Daizenshuu Vol.15 Kanzenban Eiyuu Densetsu AU SHARISHARISM	VHS; LD β	SRVM-301〜302; SRLM-301〜302; SRUM-301〜302
11th	10 July 1993	The 8th ANNIVERSARY SHARISHARISM ACE THE 8TH OF ACE	VHS; LD; 8mm	SRVM-352; SRLM-352〜353; SRWM-6352〜6353
12th	20 February 1995	10th ANNIVERSARY LIVE VIDEO SHARISHARISM IOTA	VHS; LD	SRVM-449; SRLM-449
13th	24 March 1995	10th ANNIVERSARY LIVE VIDEO SHARISHARISM THETA	VHS; LD	SRVM-434; SRLM-434
14th	1 April 1996	a K2C ENTERTAINMENT OPERA BLUE	VHS; LD	SRVM-517; SRLM-517
15th	21 September 1996	Kome Kome Club Daizenshuu Vol.4 SUEC TV RECITAL	VHS	SRVM-545
16th	21 June 1997	a K2C ENTERTAINMENT THE LAST SYMPOSIUM	VHS; LD; DVD	SRVM-5570〜5571; SRLM-5570〜5571; SRBL-1062〜1063
17th	21 July 1997	komecetera Kome Kome Club DaizenshuuVol.2,3 Shoki no Kome Kome CLUB PIT 3DAYS	VHS	SRVM-5579
18th	21 July 1997	komecetera Kome Kome Club Daizenshuu Vol.5,6 B.C. SHARISHARISM	VHS	SRVM-5580
19th	8 August 2018	a K2C ENTERTAINMENT TOUR 2017: Osekihan	BD	SRXL-168～169; SRXL-170
20th	7 August 2019	a K2C ENTERTAINMENT TOUR 2019: Okaeri	BD; DVD	SRXL-218; SRBL-1857
20th	23 December 2020	a K2C ENTERTAINMENT TOUR 2019: Okawari [SING for ONE ～Best Live Selection～]	BD; DVD	SRXL-296; SRBL-1939
21st	14 April 2021	a K2C ENTERTAINMENT 2020 ～OMUSUBI～	BD; DVD	SRXL-298〜299; SRBL-1698〜1699
22nd	10 August 2022	a K2C ENTERTAINMENT TOUR 2021	BD; DVD	SRXL-360〜361; SRBL-2060〜2061
23rd	17 April 2023	a K2C ENTERTAINMENT TOUR 2023: WILD SOUL CARNIVAL	SRXL-470; SRBL-2217	

=== Music videoclips ===
No.	Release	Title	Format	Serial No.
1st	22 July 1987	Kome KomeTV ONODA-SAN	VHS; LD; Betamax	48ZH-135; 58LH-135; 48QH-135
2nd	21 September 1991	K2C2 KOME KOME CLUB CREATORS	VHS; LD; 8mm βetamax	SRVM-276; SRLM-276; SRWM-6276; SRUM-3276
3rd	31 March 1997	KOME KOME CLUB HISTORY RICISM	VHS; LD; DVD	SRVM-5552; SRLM-5552; SRBL-1057

=== Documentaries ===
No.	Release	Title	Format	Serial No.
1st	21 June 1997	THE BEST SYMPOSIUM	VHS	SRVM-5572

=== DVD Box sets ===
No.	Release	Title	Format	Serial No.
1st	21 February 2007	a K2C ENTERTAINMENT DVD BOX Vol. I	DVD	SRBL1301〜1312
2nd	26 December 2007	a K2C ENTERTAINMENT DVD BOX Vol. III	DVD	SRBL1341〜1343
3rd	8 August 2008	a K2C ENTERTAINMENT DVD BOX Vol. II	DVD	SRBL1351〜1362
4th	8 August 2010	a K2C ENTERTAINMENT DVD BOX Vol. IV	DVD	SRBL1423〜14235
5th	26 June 2013	a K2C ENTERTAINMENT DVD BOX Vol. V	DVD	SRBL1576〜1579

== See also ==
- List of best-selling music artists in Japan
