= SMAP discography =

- Studio albums: 21
- EPs: 1
- Compilation albums: 5
- Singles: 56
- Video albums: 23
- Remix albums: 1

The discography of Japanese boy band SMAP consists of 21 studio albums, five compilation albums, 23 video albums, and numerous singles. Sports Music Assemble People, abbreviated as SMAP, was formed in 1988 by a group of backup dancers for the boy band Hikaru Genji of Johnny & Associates.

The band's initial releases performed poorly on the charts, but their later releases started gaining attention, aided by the group's appearance on their own variety show, SMAP×SMAP. Meanwhile, their 1994 single, Kimi Iro Omoi, was used as the opening theme to the animated TV series Akazukin Chacha, broadcast in Japan from 1994 to 1995. This single is only available on MP3 Store and as a download between TV size and full version. On the DVD release of the series, Kimi Iro Omoi was sung by Shoko Sawada instead. Their 2003 single, "Sekai ni Hitotsu Dake no Hana", sold over two million copies in Japan, becoming one of the best-selling singles in the country.

In August 2016, the group announced that they would disband by the end of the year. Since 2003, all of the band's releases have peaked at number one on the Oricon Albums or Singles Chart. The group has sold over 38.5 million records in Japan.

== Studio albums ==
Title	Album details	Peak chart positions	Sales (JPN)	Certifications
Title	Album details	JPN	Sales (JPN)	Certifications
SMAP 001	Released: January 1, 1992; Label: Victor Entertainment; Format(s): CD, cassette	14	81,000	
SMAP 002	Released: (CD, cassette) August 26, (DCC) December 16, 1992; Label: Victor; Format(s): CD, cassette, DCC	6	84,000	
SMAP 003	Released: January 1, 1993; Label: Victor; Format(s): CD, cassette	11	121,000	
SMAP 004	Released: July 7, 1993; Label: Victor; Format(s): CD, cassette	3	134,000	
SMAP 005	Released: February 2, 1994; Label: Victor; Format(s): CD, cassette	2	250,000	
SMAP 006: Sexy Six	Released: July 7, 1994; Label: Victor; Format(s): CD, cassette	2	254,000	JPN: Gold
SMAP 007: Gold Singer	Released: July 7, 1995; Label: Victor; Format(s): CD, cassette	1	540,000	JPN: Platinum
SMAP 008: Tacomax	Released: March 3, 1996; Label: Victor; Format(s): CD, cassette(Last Release)	2	558,000	JPN: Platinum
SMAP 009	Released: August 12, 1996; Label: Victor; Format(s): CD	1	372,000	JPN: Platinum
SMAP 011 Su (SMAP 011 ス)	Released: August 6, 1997; Label: Victor; Format(s): CD	3	484,000	JPN: Platinum
SMAP 012: Viva Amigos!	Released: June 18, 1998; Label: Victor; Format(s): CD	1	423,000	JPN: Platinum
Birdman SMAP 013	Released: July 14, 1999; Label: Victor; Format(s): CD	2	297,000	JPN: Gold
S map SMAP 014	Released: October 14, 2000; Label: Victor; Format(s): CD	2	391,000	JPN: Platinum
SMAP 015: Drink! Smap!	Released: July 24, 2002; Label: Victor; Format(s): CD	2	621,000	JPN: Platinum
SMAP 016: MIJ	Released: June 25, 2003; Label: Victor; Format(s): 2CD	1	469,000	JPN: 2× Platinum
Sample Bang!	Released: July 27, 2005; Label: Victor; Format(s): 3CD	1	402,000	JPN: 2× Platinum
Pop Up! SMAP	Released: July 26, 2006; Label: Victor; Format(s): 2CD,2CD+3D Glass Megane	1	438,000	JPN: Platinum
Super Modern Artistic Performance	Released: September 24, 2008; Label: Victor; Format(s): 2CD	1	263,000	JPN: Platinum
We Are SMAP!	Released: July 21, 2010; Label: Victor; Format(s): 2CD	1	268,000	JPN: Platinum
Gift of SMAP	Released: August 8, 2012; Label: Victor; Format(s): 2CD, 2CD+DVD,19CD+Gold Medal	1	281,000	JPN: Platinum
Mr. S	Released: September 3, 2014; Label: Victor; Format(s): 2CD, 2CD+DVD,2CD+Clutch Bag	1	226,000	JPN: Platinum

== Compilation albums ==
Title	Album details	Peak chart positions	Sales (JPN)	Certifications
Title	Album details	JPN	Sales (JPN)	Certifications
Cool	Released: January 1, 1995; Label: Victor; Format(s): CD, cassette	1	685,000	JPN: Platinum
Wool	Released: March 26, 1997; Label: Victor; Format(s): 2CD	2	628,000	JPN: Platinum
Smap Vest	Released: March 23, 2001; Label: Victor; Format(s): 2CD	1	1,810,000	JPN: 4× Platinum
Pams (ウラスマ, Urasuma)	Released: August 8, 2001; Label: Victor; Format(s): CD	1	346,000	JPN: Platinum
SMAP Aid	Released: August 17, 2011; Label: Victor; Format(s): CD	1	420,000	JPN: Platinum
SMAP 25 Years	Release: December 21, 2016; Label: Victor; Format(s): 3CD	1	1,007,000	JPN: Million

== Remix albums ==
Title	Album details	Peak chart positions	Sales (JPN)	Certifications
Title	Album details	JPN	Sales (JPN)	Certifications
Boo	Released: November 22, 1995; Label: Victor; Format(s): CD, LP (Limited Edition)	5	337,000	JPN: Gold

== Extended plays ==
Title	Album details	Peak chart positions	Sales (JPN)	Certifications
Title	Album details	JPN	Sales (JPN)	Certifications
La Festa	Released: August 26, 1998; Label: Victor; Format(s): CD	2	237,000	JPN: Gold

== Singles ==
List of singles, with selected chart positions
Title	Year	Peak chart positions		Sales (JPN)	Certifications	Album
Title	Year	JPN	JPN Hot (Note: The Japan Hot 100 was established in 2008.) (Note: Sources for chart positions are as follows: "Dangan Fighter", "Sono Mama", "White Message", "Kono Toki, Kitto Yume ja Nai", "Jazz", "Sotto Kyutto", "This Is Love", "We Are SMAP!", "Not Alone (Shiawase ni Narōyo)", "Boku no Hanbun", "Sakasama no Sora", "Moment", "Gift", "Mistake", "Battery", "Joy!!", "Shareotsu", "Yes We Are", "Koko Kara", "Top of the World", "Amazing Discovery", "Mr. S (Saitei de Saikou no Otoko)", "Suki yo", "Karei Naru Gyakushū", "Humor Shichau yo", "Otherside", "Ai ga Tomaru Made wa", "Sekai ni Hitotsu Dake no Hana", and "Arigatō".)	Sales (JPN)	Certifications	Album
"Can't Stop!! Loving"	1991	2	—	150,000		SMAP 001
"Seigi no Mikata wa Ate ni Naranai" (正義の味方はあてにならない; "I Can't Rely on a Friend of Justice")	1991	10	—	129,000		—
"Kokoro no Kagami" (心の鏡; "The Mirror of a Heart")	1992	3	—	128,000		SMAP 002
"Makeru na Baby! Never Give Up" (負けるなBaby!～Never give up; "Don't Lose, Baby! Never Give Up")	1992	5	—	95,000		SMAP 003
"Smile Senshi Oto Ranger (スマイル戦士 音レンジャー; "Smile Warrior, Sound Ranger") (Note: Performed as Otomatsu-kun (音松くん).)	1992	6	—			—
"Egao no Genki" (笑顔のゲンキ; "The Energy of Your Smiling Face")	1992	8	—	120,000		SMAP 004
"Yuki ga Futtekita" (雪が降ってきた; "It's Started Snowing")	1992	7	—	191,000		SMAP 004
"Zutto Wasurenai" (ずっと忘れない; "I'll Never Forget")	1993	7	—	217,000		SMAP 004
"Hajimete no Natsu" (はじめての夏; "First Summer")	1993	7	—	168,000		Cool
"Kimi wa Kimi da yo" (君は君だよ; "You Are Who You Are")	1993	7	—	154,000		Cool
"$10"	1993	5	—	317,000	JPN (physical): Gold	SMAP 005
"Kimi Iro Omoi" (君色思い; "Wild Thoughts About You")	1994	5	—	259,000	JPN (physical): Gold	SMAP 005
"Hey Hey Ōki ni Maido Ari" (Hey Hey おおきに毎度あり; "Hey Hey Thanks For Your Business")	1994	1	—	401,000	JPN (physical): Gold	SMAP 006: Sexy Six
"Original Smile" (オリジナル スマイル, Orijinaru Sumairu)	1994	2	—	407,000	JPN (physical): Gold	SMAP 006: Sexy Six
"Ganbarimashō" (がんばりましょう; "Let's Work Hard!")	1994	1	—	720,000	JPN (physical): Platinum	Cool
"Tabun Alright" (たぶんオーライ; "It's Probably Alright")	1994	1	—	636,000	JPN (physical): Platinum	SMAP 007: Gold Singer
"Kansha Shite" (Kanshaして; "Gratitudes")	1995	1	—	578,000	JPN (physical): Platinum	SMAP 007: Gold Singer
"Shiyō yo" (しようよ; "Let's Do It")	1995	1	—	613,000	JPN (physical): Platinum	SMAP 007: Gold Singer
"Donna Ii Koto" (どんないいこと; "Whatever Nice Things")	1995	1	—	538,000	JPN (physical): Platinum	SMAP 008 Tacomax
"Oretachi ni Asu wa Aru" (俺たちに明日はある; "There's a Tomorrow for Us")	1995	1	—	785,000	JPN (physical): Platinum	SMAP 008 Tacomax
"Munasawagi o Tanomu yo" (胸さわぎを頼むよ, "Please Move My Heart")	1996	2	—	500,000	JPN (physical): Platinum	SMAP 008 Tacomax
"Hadaka no Ōsama (Shibutoku Tsuyoku)" (はだかの王様～シブトク つよく～; "The Naked King (Stubborn and Strong)")	1996	2	—	626,000	JPN (physical): Platinum	SMAP 009
"Aoi Inazuma" (青いイナズマ; "Blue Thunder")	1996	1	—	814,000	JPN (physical): Platinum	Wool
"Shake"	1996	1	—	876,000	JPN (physical): 2× Platinum	Wool
"Dynamite" (ダイナマイト, Dainamaito)	1997	3	—	731,000	JPN (physical): 2× Platinum	SMAP 011 Su
"Celery" (セロリ, Serori)	1997	2	— (Note: "Kokoro Puzzle Rhythm" and "Celery" charted at number 22 and number 46 respectively on the Japan Adult Contemporary Airplay Chart in 2008.)	732,000	JPN (physical): Platinum	SMAP 011 Su
"Peace!"	1997	2	—	365,000	JPN (physical): Platinum	SMAP 012 Viva Amigos!
"Yozora no Mukō" (夜空ノムコウ; "Beyond the Night Sky")	1998	1	— (Note: Charted at number 27 on the Japan Adult Contemporary Airplay Chart in 2014.)	1,621,000	JPN (physical): 4× Platinum	SMAP 012 Viva Amigos!
"Taisetsu" (たいせつ; "Important")	1998	4	—	412,000	JPN (physical): Platinum	SMAP 012 Viva Amigos!
"Asahi o Mi ni Ikō yo" (朝日を見に行こうよ; "Let's Go See the Sunrise")	1999	3	—	383,000	JPN (physical): Platinum	Birdman: SMAP 013
"Fly"	1999	2	—	360,000	JPN (physical): Gold	Birdman: SMAP 013
"Let It Be"	2000	4	—	307,000	JPN (physical): Gold	S map SMAP 014
"Lion Heart" (らいおんハート, Raion Hāto)	2000	1	— (Note: Charted at number 75 on the Japan Adult Contemporary Airplay Chart in 2011.)	1,565,000	JPN (physical): 3× Platinum	S map SMAP 014
"Smac"	2001	3	—	225,000	JPN (physical): Gold	—
"Freebird"	2002	1	—	309,000	JPN (physical): Platinum	SMAP 015/Drink! Smap!
"Sekai ni Hitotsu Dake no Hana" (世界に一つだけの花; "A Flower Unlike Any Other in the World")	2003	1	2 (Note: Charted in 2016.)	3,008,000	JPN (physical): 3× Million	SMAP 015/Drink! Smap!
"Tomodachi e (Say What You Will)" (友だちへ～Say What You Will～; "To My Friends")	2005	1	—	365,000	JPN (physical): Platinum	Sample Bang!
"Bang! Bang! Vacance!" (Bang! Bang! バカンス!, Bang! Bang! Bakansu!)	2005	1	—	402,000	JPN (physical): Platinum	—
"Triangle"	2005	1	—	341,000	JPN (physical): Platinum	Pop Up! SMAP
"Dear Woman"	2006	1	—	419,000	JPN (physical): Platinum	Pop Up! SMAP
"Arigatō" (ありがとう; "Thank You")	2006	1	6 (Note: Charted in 2016.)	361,000	JPN (physical): Platinum	—
"Dangan Fighter" (弾丸ファイター; "Bullet Fighter")	2007	1	8	174,000	JPN (physical): Platinum	—
"Sono Mama" (そのまま; "Just That Way")	2008	1	1	158,000	JPN (physical): Platinum	Super Modern Artistic Performance
"White Message"	2008	1	81	158,000		—
"Kono Toki, Kitto Yume ja Nai" (この瞬間（とき）、きっと夢じゃない; "This Moment, I Know It's Not a Dream")	2008	1	1	136,000	JPN (physical): Gold	Super Modern Artistic Performance
"Sotto Kyutto" (そっと きゅっと; "Softly, Tightly")	2009	1	1	139,000	JPN (physical): Gold	We Are SMAP!
"Superstar" (スーパースター★, Sūpāsutā)	2009	1	— (Note: Charted at number 89 on the Radio Songs Chart.)	139,000		—
"This Is Love"	2010	1	1	353,000	JPN (physical): Platinum	SMAP Aid
"Not Alone (Shiawase ni Narō yo)" (not alone〜幸せになろうよ〜; "Not Alone (Let's Be Happy)")	2011	— (Note: Ineligible to chart on Oricon Singles Chart as it was not released as a physical CD.)	8			SMAP Aid
"Boku no Hanbun" (僕の半分; "Half of Me")	2011	1	1	165,000	JPN (physical): Gold	—
"Sakasama no Sora" (さかさまの空; "Upside-down Sky")	2012	1	1	183,000	JPN (physical): Gold	Gift of SMAP
"Moment"	2012	1	1	187,000	JPN (physical): Gold	—
"Mistake"	2013	1	1	235,000	JPN (physical): Platinum	Mr. S
"Battery"	2013	1	6	235,000		—
"Joy!!"	2013	1	1	397,000	JPN (physical): Platinum	Mr. S
"Shareotsu" (シャレオツ; "Trendy")"	2013	1	1	251,000	JPN (physical): Platinum	Non-album singles
"Hello" (ハロー, Harō)	2013	1	—	251,000		Non-album singles
"Yes We Are"	2014	1	1	168,000	JPN (physical): Gold	Non-album singles
"Koko Kara" (ココカラ; "From Here")	2014	1	44	168,000		Non-album singles
"Top of the World"	2014	1	1	167,000	JPN (physical): Gold	Non-album singles
"Amazing Discovery"	2014	1	78	167,000		Non-album singles
"Karei Naru Gyakushū" (華麗なる逆襲; "Magnificent Counterattack")	2015	1	1	184,000	JPN (physical): Gold	Non-album singles
"Humor Shichau yo" (ユーモアしちゃうよ; "I'm Being Really Humorous")	2015	1	56	184,000		Non-album singles
"Otherside"	2015	1	1	166,000	JPN (physical): Gold	Non-album singles
"Ai ga Tomaru Made wa" (愛が止まるまでは; "Until the End of Love")	2015	1	64	166,000		Non-album singles
"—" denotes items which were released before the creation of the listed charts or items that did not chart.

=== Promotional singles ===
List of promotional singles, with selected chart positions
Title	Year	Peak chart positions		Album
Title	Year	JPN Hot	JPN RIAJ (Note: The RIAJ Digital Track Chart is a deprecated chart that ran from 2009 until early 2012 and tracked full-length cellphone downloads.) (Note: Sources for chart positions are as follows: "Orange", "Love & Peace Inside?", and "Gift".)	Album
"Jazz"	2008	32	—	Super Modern Artistic Performance
"Kokoro Puzzle Rhythm" (ココロパズルリズム; "Heart Puzzle Rhythm")	2008	—	—	Super Modern Artistic Performance
"We Are SMAP!"	2010	100	—	We Are SMAP!
"Magic Time"	2010	— (Note: "Magic Time" charted at number 100 on the Radio Songs sub-chart.)	—	We Are SMAP!
"Gift"	2012	21	16	Gift of SMAP
"Mr. S (Saitei de Saikou no Otoko)" ("Mr. S (The Worst and Greatest Man)")	2014	10	—	Mr. S
"Suki yo" (好きよ; "I Like You")	2014	67	—	Mr. S
"—" denotes items which were released before the creation of the listed charts or items that did not chart.

=== Other songs ===
List of songs not released as singles or promotional singles, with selected chart positions
Title	Year	Peak chart positions	Album
Title	Year	JPN RIAJ	Album
"Orange"	2000	9	"Lion Heart" (single)
"Tabidachi no Hi ni" (旅立ちの日に; "On the Day We Set Off to Travel")	2007	—	—
"Happy Happy SMAP" (Note: Released exclusively through SMAP Shop.)	2007	—	—
"Merry Happy SMAP"	2008	—	—
"Chan to Shi Nai to ne!" ("If You Don't Give It 100%")	2009	—	—
"Love & Peace Inside?"	2010	96	We Are SMAP!
"Are You SMAP?"	2010	—	—
"Running SMAP!"	2011	—	—
"Gift from SMAP"	2012	—	—
"50 Go SMAP"	2013	—	—
"Saikou de Saikou no Smap Shop 2014–2015" ("The Greatest and Greatest SMAP Shop 2014–2015")	2014	—	—
"—" denotes items which were released before the creation of the listed charts or items that did not chart.

== Videography ==
=== Video albums ===
List of media, with selected chart positions
Title	Album details	Peak chart positions		Certifications
Title	Album details	JPN DVD	JPN Blu-ray	Certifications
Hop Smap Jump!	Released: September 21, 1991; Label: Victor; Format(s): VHS	—	—	
1992.1 SMAP 1st Live: Yattekimashita Oshogatsu!! Concert (1992.1 SMAP 1st LIVE 「やってきましたお正月!!」コンサート)	Released: (VHS, LD) March 14, (DVD) 1992 December 24, 2003; Label: Victor; Format(s): VHS, LD, DVD	72 (Note: Charted in 2003)	—	
Original Story Kokoro no Kagami (オリジナル・ストーリー 心の鏡)	Released: (VHS, LD) September 9, 1992 (DVD) December 24, 2003; Label: Victor; Format(s): VHS, LD, DVD	—	—	
Sexy Six Show	Released: (VHS, LD) November 11, 1994; (DVD) December 24, 2003: Label: Victor; Format(s): VHS, LD, DVD	83	—	
SMAP 007 Movies: Summer Minna Atsumare Party	Released: (VHS, LD) December 16, 1995 (DVD) December 24, 2003; Label: Victor; Format(s): VHS, LD, DVD	93	—	
SMAP Winter Concert 1995–1996	Released: July 8, 1996(Fanclub Only); Label: Victor; Format(s): VHS	—	—	
SMAP 010 "Ten"	Released: (VHS, LD) December 9, 1996 (DVD) December 6, 2000; Label: Victor; Format(s): VHS, LD, DVD	—	—	
1997 SMAP Live Su (1997 SMAP LIVE ス)	Released: December 17, 1997; Label: Victor; Format(s): VHS, LD, DVD	—	—	
SMAP Live Amigos!	Released: (VHS, LD) December 24, 1998 (DVD) December 6, 2000; Label: Victor; Format(s): VHS, LD, DVD	—	—	
Live Birdman	Released: December 22, 1999; (DVD) January 1, 2000: Label: Victor; Format(s): VHS, LD(Last release), DVD	8	—	
Live S map	Released: March 14, 2001; Label: Victor; Format(s): VHS, DVD	3	—	
SMAP Short Films	Released: August 8, 2001; Label: Victor; Format(s): VHS	2	—	
Live Pams (LIVE ウラスマ, Live Urasuma)	Released: December 21, 2001; Label: Victor; Format(s): VHS, DVD	3	—	
Clip! Smap!	Released: September 21, 2002; Label: Victor; Format(s): VHS, DVD	2	—	
Smap! Tour! 2002!	Released: March 5, 2003; Label: Victor; Format(s): VHS, DVD	1	—	JPN: Platinum
Live MIJ	Released: December 24, 2003; Label: Victor; Format(s): VHS, DVD	1	—	JPN: Gold
SMAP to Itsu Chatta! SMAP Sample Tour 2005 (SMAPとイッちゃった! SMAP Sample Tour 2005)	Released: December 24, 2005; Label: Victor; Format(s): VHS, DVD	1	—	JPN: Platinum
Pop Up! SMAP Live! Omottayori Tonjaimashita! Tour (Pop Up! SMAP LIVE! 思ったより飛んじゃいました! ツアー)	Released: December 6, 2006; Label: Victor; Format(s): VHS(Last release), DVD	2	—	JPN: Gold
SMAP 2008 Super Modern Artistic Performance Tour	Released: December 17, 2008; Label: Victor; Format(s): DVD, Blu-ray	1	50	JPN: Platinum
We Are SMAP! 2010 Concert DVD	Released: December 8, 2010; Label: Victor; Format(s): DVD, Blu-ray	1	53	JPN: Gold
SMAP Thanks for Beijing!!	Released: December 7, 2011; Label: Victor; Format(s): DVD	1	—	
Gift of SMAP Concert 2012	Released: December 5, 2012; Label: Victor; Format(s): DVD, Blu-ray	1	38	JPN: Gold
Mr. S "Saikou de Saikou no Concert Tour"	Released: December 10, 2015; Label: Victor; Format(s): DVD, Blu-ray	1	1	JPN: Gold
"—" denotes items which were released before the creation of the DVD and/or Blu-ray charts, or items that did not chart.
