= List of Oricon number-one albums of 2017 =

The following is a list of Oricon number-one albums of 2017.

== Chart history ==
Issue date	Album	Artist(s)	Reference(s)
January 2	SMAP 25 Years	SMAP	
January 9	SMAP 25 Years	SMAP	
January 16	Ballad Selection	KinKi Kids	
January 23	Ambitions	One Ok Rock	
January 30	E.G. Crazy	E-girls	
February 6	Thumbnail	AKB48	
February 13	ALL SINGLeeeeS ～& New Beginning～	Greeeen	
February 20	One Voice	Kyuhyun	
February 27	Made	Big Bang	
March 6	Way of Glory	AAA	
March 13	Born To Be Wild	Exile The Second	
March 20	W Face: Outside	Koda Kumi	
March 27	Mabataki	Yuki	
April 3	Neverland	News	
April 10	The JSB World	Sandaime J Soul Brothers from Exile Tribe	
April 17	LOVE, PEACE & FIRE	Superfly	
April 24	D-Day	D-Lite	
May 1	Koichi Domoto Endless Shock Original Sound Track 2	Koichi Domoto	
May 8	Yuzu Iroha 1997-2017	Yuzu	
May 15	MUSIC COLOSSEUM	Kis-My-Ft2	
May 22	Yuzu Iroha 1997-2017	Yuzu	
May 29	The Yellow Monkey is Here. New Best	The Yellow Monkey	
June 5	Umaretekara Hajimete Mita Yume	Nogizaka46	
June 12	Ebi Cracy	Shiritsu Ebisu Chugaku	
June 19	"Kemono Friends" Drama & Character Song Album "Japari Cafe"	Kemono Friends	
June 26	All Time Best Hata Motohiro	Motohiro Hata	
July 3	Acid BLOOD Cherry	Acid Black Cherry	
July 10	Jam	Kanjani Eight	
July 17	CYCLE HIT 1991-2017 Spitz Complete Single Collection -30th Anniversary BOX	Spitz	
July 24	Summerdelics	Glay	
July 31	Masshiro na Mono wa Yogoshitaku naru	Keyakizaka46	
August 7	Hey! Say! JUMP 2007-2017 I/O	Hey! Say! JUMP	
August 14	Namba Ai - Ima, Omou Koto	NMB48	
August 21	The ONES	V6	
August 28	New Kids: Begin	iKon	
September 4	Garakuta	Keisuke Kuwata	
September 11	Blackpink	Blackpink	
September 18	The Moonlight Cats Radio Show Vol.1	Shōgo Hamada & The J.S. Inspirations	
September 25	Garakuta	Keisuke Kuwata	
October 2	REGALITY	TRIGGER	
October 9	Love Yourself: Her	BTS	
October 16	The Gift	Hi-Standard	
October 23	The Dream Quest	Dreams Come True	
October 30	Untitled	Arashi	
November 6	Fine Collection: Begin Again	TVXQ	
November 13	BOOTLEG	Kenshi Yonezu	
November 20	Finally	Namie Amuro	
November 27	Finally	Namie Amuro	
December 4	Finally	Namie Amuro	
December 11	Dinosaur	B'z	
December 18	The BEST	KinKi Kids	
December 25	Busaiku no, Wa!	Busaiku	

== See also ==
- List of Oricon number-one singles of 2017
