= SMAP 25 Years =

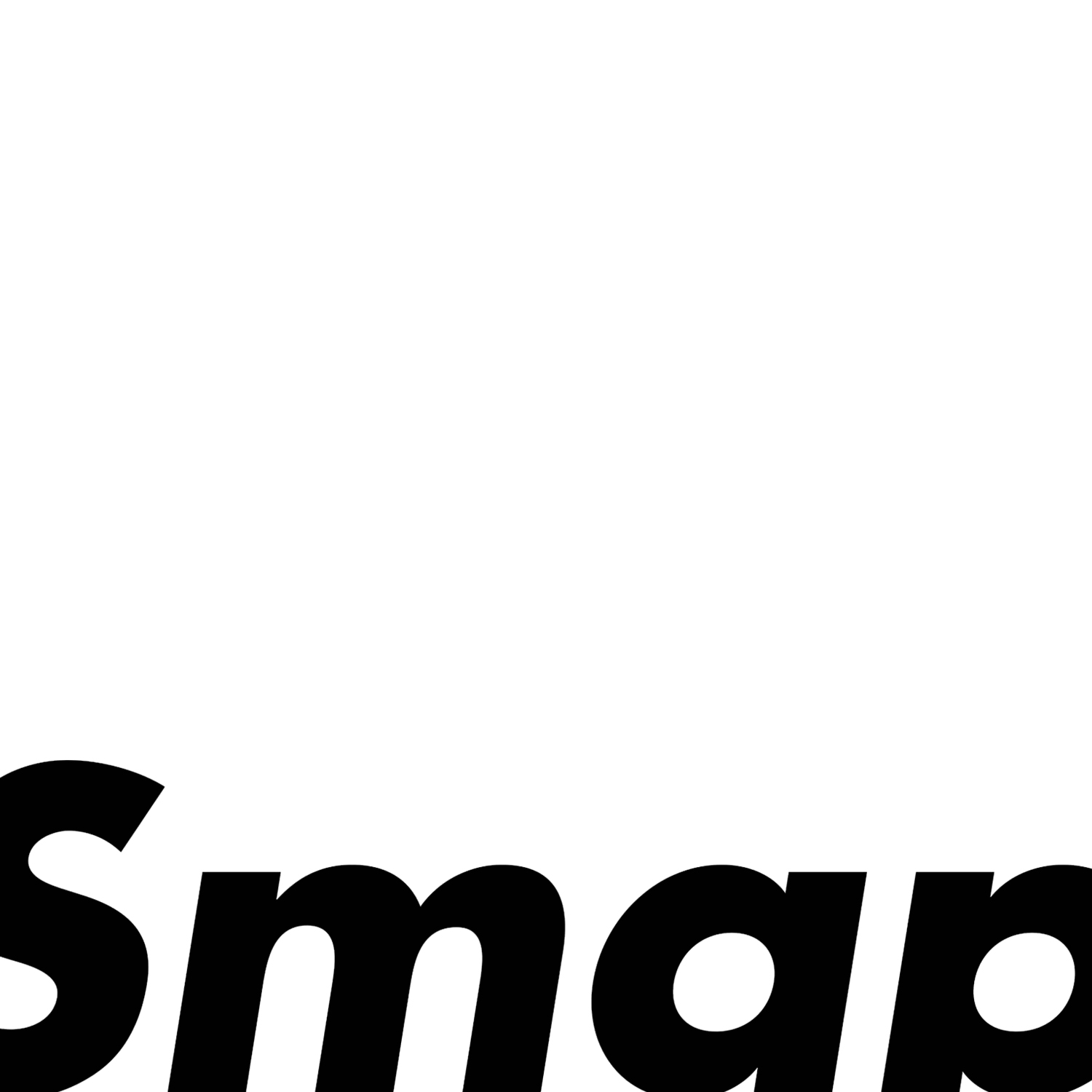

Greatest hits album by SMAP
- Released: 21 December 2016
- Recorded: 1992–2015
- Length: 3:49:49
- Label: Victor Entertainment

SMAP chronology
Mr. S (2014)	SMAP 25 Years (2016)

SMAP 25 Years is a greatest hits album by Japanese boy band SMAP and the last one overall before their disbandment. It was released on 21 December 2016. It reached number-one on the weekly Oricon Albums Chart with 667,802 copies sold. It also reached number-one on the Billboard Japan Hot Albums chart. It went on to sell over 1,174,000 copies and was the second best-selling album in Japan of 2017.

== Track listing ==
Disc 1
No.	Title	Lyrics	Music	Arrangement	Length
1.	"Can't Stop!! Loving"	Hiromi Mori	Jimmy Johnson	Motoki Funayama	5:10
2.	"Best Friend"	Mori; Yūko Fukushima	Kyōhei Tsutsumi	Takayuki Hijikata	3:46
3.	"Egao no Genki" (笑顔のゲンキ)	Mori	Kōji Makaino	Funayama	4:31
4.	"Kimi wa Kimi da yo" (君は君だよ)	Megumi Ogura	Shin Tanimoto	Tōru Shigemi	4:38
5.	"Dōshite mo Kimi ga Ii" (どうしても君がいい)	Ogura	Makaino	Chokkaku	4:29
6.	"$10"	Mori; Kenji Hayashida	Hayashida	Chokkaku	4:26
7.	"Kimi Iro Omoi" (君色思い)	Hayashida	Hayashida	Chokkaku	4:42
8.	"Original Smile" (オリジナル スマイル)	Mori	Mark Davies	Chokkaku	5:05
9.	"Ganbarimashō" (がんばりましょう)	Ogura	Kenichi Shōno	Shōno	3:47
10.	"Bokutachi ni Asu wa Aru" (俺たちに明日はある)	Takeshi Aida	Masayuki Iwata	Iwata	4:15
11.	"Aoi Inazuma" (青いイナズマ)	Mori; Candee Hayashida	Hayashida	Chokkaku	4:36
12.	"Shake"	Mori	Minoru Komorita	Chokkaku	4:21
13.	"Dynamite" (ダイナマイト)	Mori	Komorita	Komorita	4:48
14.	"Yozora no Mukō" (夜空ノムコウ)	Shikao Suga	Yuka Kawamura	Chokkaku	4:33
15.	"Taisetsu" (たいせつ)	Masami Tozawa	Komorita	Seikō Nagaoka	3:55
16.	"Five True Love"	N. Mappī; Shingo; Kyōko Habu	N. Mappī; Satoshi Hidaka	Hidaka	4:33
17.	"Lion Heart" (らいおんハート)	Shinji Nojima	Komorita	Komorita	4:24

Disc 2
No.	Title	Lyrics	Music	Arrangement	Length
1.	"Orange" (オレンジ)	Yoshiyasu Ichikawa	Ichikawa	Zaki	5:00
2.	"Freebird"	Satori Shiraishi	Shiraishi	Shiraishi	4:34
3.	"Five Respect"	N. Mappī; Osamu Suzuki	N. Mappī	Daichi Hideyuki Suzuki	6:09
4.	"Sekai ni Hitotsu Dake no Hana" (Single version)	Noriyuki Makihara	Makihara	Makihara; Satoshi Kadokura	4:40
5.	"Boku wa Kimi o Tsurete Yuku" (僕は君を連れてゆく)	Tetsuo Kudō	Takashi Tsushimi	Tsushimi	4:38
6.	"Summer Gate"	Kōji Ide	Ryō Yonemitsu	Yonemitsu	4:32
7.	"A Song For Your Love"	Ryūtarō Kihara	Jun Saitō	Seiji Mutō	4:38
8.	"Summertime Blues" (夏日憂歌)	Ichikawa	Ichikawa	Takao Konishi	5:15
9.	"Susume!" (ススメ!)	Taku Tada	Takuya	Keiji Tanabe	5:22
10.	"Song of X'smap"	Tetsurō Asō	Yoko Kanno	Mutō	5:23
11.	"Bang! Bang! Vacance" (BANG! BANG! バカンス!)	Kankurō Kudō	Komorita	Komorita	4:28
12.	"Dawn"	Kōsuke Morimoto	Morimoto	Morimoto; Yūta Nakano	5:25
13.	"Fine, Peace!"	Keiko Sahara	Genki Hibino	Hitoshi Harukawa	4:48
14.	"Triangle"	Ichikawa	Ichikawa	Konishi	5:00
15.	"Dear Woman"	Asō	Shōichirō Hirata	Hirata	4:47

Disc 3
No.	Title	Lyrics	Music	Arrangement	Length
1.	"Arigatō" (ありがとう)	Morishins'	Morishins'	Reo	4:53
2.	"Simple"	Ryūichi Shinozaki	Teppei Shimizu; Stefan Engblom; Axel Bellinder	Ryosuke Nakanishi	4:38
3.	"Stay"	Sahara	Hibino	Hitoshi Munakata	4:58
4.	"Kono Toki, Kitto Yume janai" (この瞬間、きっと夢じゃない)	Hi-Fi Camp	Hi-Fi Camp	Nagaoka	3:40
5.	"Hajimari no Uta" (はじまりのうた)	Takamitsu Shimazaki	Shimazaki	Shimazaki; Crusher Kimura	4:15
6.	"Dōka Todokimasu Yō ni" (どうか届きますように)	Morishins'	Morishins'	Reo	4:32
7.	"Chomolungma no Uta" (チョモランマの唄)	Takaaki Yamazaki	Yamazaki	Tatsuo Kondō	1:46
8.	"Sakasama no Sora"	Asō	Kanno	Kanno	4:35
9.	"Te o Tsunagō"	Kenichi Maeyamada	Maeyamada	Shunya Shimizu	5:01
10.	"Gift"	Asō	Kanno	Chokkaku	4:19
11.	"Mae ni!"	Kiyosumi Īda; Zopp	Īda	Akimitsu Honma	3:28
12.	"Crazy Five"	N. Mappī	N. Mappī	N. Mappī; Kōji Miyashita; Masaya Miyashita	8:47
13.	"Battery"	Jeff Miyahara	Miyahara; Black Sheep	Miyahara; Black Sheep	3:42
14.	"Joy!!"	Maisa Tsuno	Tsuno	Kanno	3:57
15.	"Shareotsu"	Sōsaku Ōtake	Miyahara; Black Sheep	Miyahara; Black Sheep	4:03
16.	"Amazing Discovery"	Yasutaka Nakata	Nakata	Nakata	3:52
17.	"Beat Full Day" (ビートフルデイ)	Ōtake	Taku Takahashi	Takahashi; Mitsunori Ikeda	4:13
18.	"Karei naru Gyakushū" (華麗なる逆襲)	Ringo Sheena	Sheena	Yōichi Murata	4:11

== Charts ==
=== Oricon ===
Chart	Peak	Debut Sales	Sales Total
Weekly Albums Chart	1	667,802	1,174,000

=== Billboard Japan ===
Chart	Peak
Hot Albums	1
Top Albums Sales	1
