= Masahiro Nakai =

Retired Japanese entertainer (born 1972)

- 中居 正広
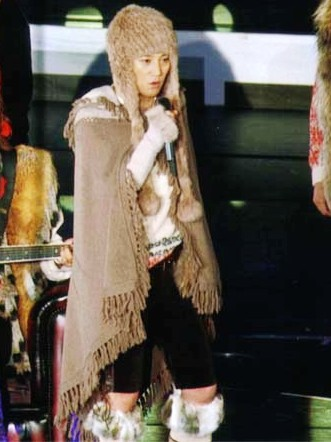
- From SMAP 2008 super.modern.artistic.performance tour
- Born: August 18, 1972 (age 54); Fujisawa, Kanagawa, Japan
- Occupations: MC; actor
- Years active: 1986–2025
- Agent: Nonbirinakai
- Musical career
- Genres: Pop
- Occupations: Singer, song-writer
- Instruments: Vocals, piano
- Label: Victor Entertainment
- Formerly of: SMAP

Masahiro Nakai (中居 正広, Nakai Masahiro; born August 18, 1972) is a Japanese former television personality, actor, radio personality, and singer. He debuted as the leader of the boy band SMAP, which had been the best-selling boy band in Asia. While working as a member of a boy band, he worked extensively as a television presenter, hosting many of his own talk shows, variety shows, music shows, news programs, and several Olympic games as a sportscaster.

He is credited for changing the Japanese entertainment industry, becoming the first non-comedian celebrity to have a career as a television host and expanding the capacity of a boy band. He is one of the wealthiest and highest-paid celebrities in Japan, identified as the highest tax payer in the Japanese entertainment industry by the Japanese National Tax Bureau in 2003.

In December 2024 reports surfaced in Japanese tabloids that Nakai sexually assaulted a woman in her twenties in June 2023. Despite Nakai issuing an apology the following month, many of his TV and radio programs were suspended, cancelled, or removed Nakai as a presenter following the withdrawal of numerous sponsors. Nakai subsequently announced his retirement on January 23, 2025.

== Early life ==
Nakai was born in Fujisawa City, Kanagawa Prefecture. He is the youngest of three boys. As a child, he lived in poverty in a small two-room house with a family of five, and sometimes lacked food. Nakai had dreamed to become a professional baseball player and was a member of a youth baseball team. However, he gave up that dream when he was diagnosed with Little League elbow in the fifth grade of elementary school.

== Career ==
=== Overview ===
Nakai sent his resume to Johnny & Associates when he was 14 years old in 1986, when he was in junior high school, and after auditioning, he entered the show business in the same year. He was influenced by the fact that there was a boy belonging to Johnny's at the same junior high school and that model Saki Takaoka and a senior member of Johnny's, Atsuhiro Sato, were at a nearby junior high school in Fujisawa City.

After the other future members of SMAP had auditioned, the following year, in autumn 1987, twenty boys from ages ten to seventeen were put together into a group called The Skate Boys, initially created as backup dancers for boy band Hikaru Genji. In April 1988, producer Johnny Kitagawa chose six out of the twenty boys to create a new boy band and named them "SMAP". Nakai, being the oldest of the group, was chosen to become the leader.

He is especially known for his ability as an emcee for variety show and music show. After being selected to host NHK's New Year's Eve music show Kōhaku Uta Gassen in 1997, Nakai hosted the program a total of six times, and since 1998 he has hosted Fuji Television's summer signature program, FNS 27 Hours TV, a total of eight times, he has been the main host of TBS TV's major music program Ongaku no Hi (音楽の日) every year since 2011.

Nakai became a successful celebrity with many regular programs, mainly as an emcee. He was a regular on lists of high taxpayers published until 2005 in Japan.

Nakai had been working as a solo artist since the disbandment of SMAP in 2016, but left Johnny & Associates at the end of March 2020 to set up his own private agency, Nobirinakai (のんびりなかい).

In a press conference held on February 21, 2020, Nakai explained that the reason for his departure was that he had been burned out since the disbandment of SMAP in 2016, and after two years had passed, he became to think changing his environment in order to regain his passion once again, so he wanted to become independent even if it meant leaving the company that had taken care of him so well. Nakai's independence from Johnny's was said to have been an amicable departure, which was unusual until then, and many executives from Johnny's attended his press conference.

He has been awarded the Medal with Dark Blue Ribbon three times in succession in 2021, 2022, and 2023 for his private donations.

Nakai took a leave of absence on July 14, 2022, for surgery for acute appendicitis and returned to work on July 18, 2022. However, he began to miss shows again around October of the same year due to health problems, and announced on December 2 that he was taking a leave of absence, returning to work on January 14, 2023.

Masahiro Nakai announced on January 23, 2025, that he would retire from the entertainment industry. This was reported on his paid membership site "Nonbirinakai". Along with this, he announced that his private office, Nonbirinakai, would also close down as soon as its operations were completed. After news about his retirement was out, "Nonbirinakai" (のんびりなかい), "Nakai-kun's retirement" (中居くん引退) and "Nakai Zura" (中居ヅラ) trended on X (formerly known as Twitter).

=== Music ===
Nakai did not consider himself a good singer but he was a talented dancer. In particular, he excelled at locking. "Nakai was serious and got better and better at it. He is the type of person who can do a lot of things because he loves to dance and learns hard," said Bobby Yoshino, who choreographed SMAP's debut song "Can't Stop! Loving," evaluated. Later, artist Daichi Miura said "Nakai is the one who spread locking in Japan." After SMAP broke up in 2016, Nakai was never seen dancing, but on January 31, 2018, he made a surprise appearance at a concert held at Nakano Sunplaza by Busaiku, a junior group he was working with. Nakai wore a white costume and appeared with a special version of "Fire & Lightning" and danced with the four members of Busaiku, earning cheers from the audience.

=== Acting ===
In 1988, he made his acting debut in a television series, Abunai Shonen III, along with his band members. After several supporting roles, in 1995, he landed his first major role in a drama television series, Aji Ichimonme. Following its success, he established himself as a leading man, starring in many high-rated television series such as, Densetsu no Kyoushi (2000), Shiroi Kage (2001), Suna no Utsuwa (2004), and Ataru (2012). In 2008, he starred in a blockbuster film, Watashi wa Kai ni Naritai (2008). He was also known for his acting skills, having won numerous acting awards since his first acting award for Ajiichimonme.

=== Television ===
Before Nakai's debut in 1990, the then 18-year-old had already declared in a magazine interview that he wanted to try his hand at hosting and variety. The TBS TV music show Utaban, which aired from 1996 to 2010, was hosted by Nakai and popular comedian Takaaki Ishibashi. At the time, it was unusual for a comedian and an idol to host together. Although the show was a music show, it centered on light-hearted talk with guests, and the duo's unreserved questioning of guests became popular. It is said that Nakai began to listen carefully to guests because of Utaban. In 1996, he launched his first self-titled television program, Nakai-kun Onsen. In 1997, he became the youngest male presenter to host the Kohaku Uta Gassen at age 25. As of December 2024, Nakai had regular programs such as Masahiro Nakai no Doyoubi na Kai, Dareka to Nakai, The! Sekai Gyoten News, Masahiro Nakai's Friday no Sma Tachi he, special program Nakai no Mado the radio program Masahiro Nakai On & On Air, and the commercials for Softbank and "Timey". He was also scheduled to appear on the new show The MC3 the following month.

=== Sportscaster ===
From 1995, he started utilizing his knowledge on sports, serving as a sports commentator on Sunday Jungle, from 1995 to 2000. In 2004, he officially launched his career as a sportscaster, after becoming the host of TBS' coverage of the 2004 Summer Olympics and has hosted the channel's broadcasts of seven Olympic games. He is also known for his love of baseball and has been an official supporter of Japan national baseball team six times through 2024, at the World Baseball Classic since 2013 and the WBSC Premier12 since 2015.

=== TV commercials ===
- Nissin Foods "Hyoe Don" (2004–2015)
- Mitsubishi Motors Mirage, Mirage Asti, RVR
- Coca-Cola Zero (2015–2016)
- The Idolmaster Cinderella Girls: Starlight Stage (2015–)

== Sexual misconduct scandal, retirement, and aftermath ==
=== Timeline of events leading to retirement ===
In December 2024, reports surfaced in Japanese tabloid newspapers that Nakai allegedly engaged in nonconsensual sexual activity with an unnamed woman in her twenties in June 2023. Nakai reportedly paid the woman a substantial settlement. (Note: Initially, it was the tabloid journalism magazines Josei Seven and Shukan Bunshun that reported that "the settlement amount was 90 million yen," but in an article in another tabloid magazine Shukan Post published on January 17, 2025, the victim woman herself gave an interview and said, "I did not receive 90 million yen." and she had hinted that the settlement was much smaller. On the other hand, Nakai's side stated that she could not answer the amount because it would be a breach of confidentiality. The Japanese Wikipedia has already deleted the 90 million yen figure and replaced it with the expression "settlement money" (解決金).) (Note: It is reported by the tabloids to be between 80 and 90 million yen, but neither Nakai nor the woman has revealed the amount of the settlement, as it is considered confidential.)

In January 2025, Nakai issued an apology through his agency, acknowledging that there was trouble which "all resulted from my shortcomings". He said he could not answer the details of the trouble due to confidentiality obligations that arose during the settlement, but denied some of the reported allegations, including violence, and added that he believed he could continue his career. Japanese television networks TV Asahi and Nippon TV suspended Nakai from its broadcasts in response to the allegations, while Fuji Television and TBS reportedly said that they would examine the issue.

Fuji TV also denied a report by the Shūkan Bunshun that one of its employees set up the date between Nakai and the woman. Shortly after an affiliate of American activist fund Dalton Investments (a minority shareholder of Fuji Media Holdings) sent an open letter to Fuji TV calling on their board to open an independent investigation and alleging that its handling of the Nakai matter exposed "serious flaws" in their corporate governance, Fuji TV president Koichi Minato apologized over the allegations and announced that an investigation panel consisting of third-party lawyers would be established. Minato added that while the network was aware of the incident in June 2023 between Nakai and the woman, it was not disclosed in the interest of the woman's privacy and her physical and mental recovery. On January 17 Shūkan Bunshun, citing an unnamed Fuji TV announcer, reported that the Fuji TV staffer who allegedly arranged the 2023 dinner party had arranged other similar parties for Nakai and Fuji TV.

Over 50 Japanese companies reportedly pulled advertising from Fuji TV programs since the surfacing of the allegations, including Toyota, Nissan, Seven & I Holdings, Shiseido and Meiji Yasuda Life. Radio programs and television shows starring Nakai, including Masahiro Nakai ON&ON AIR, Masahiro Nakai Friday Smiles and Dareka to Nakai, were either suspended or cancelled. He had also been dropped as a presenter on programs including THE MC3 and The World's Most Shocking News.

On January 23, 2025, Nakai announced his retirement from show business on his fan club website "Nonbirinakai," apologizing for having to say goodbye without seeing his fans. Former SMAP members Goro Inagaki, Tsuyoshi Kusanagi, and Shingo Katori provided a joint comment regarding the issue: "This happened so suddenly that we have yet to process it emotionally, we are at a loss for words. We would like to refrain from speaking about it at this time. We appreciate your understanding." Former SMAP member and current professional moto racer Katsuyuki Mori also sent a message regarding Nakai: "I was surprised to hear the news. I will refrain from commenting. Thank you for your understanding."

On January 27, 2025, as a consequence of the scandal, Fuji TV announced major leadership changes - Fuji TV president Koichi Minato, and Shuji Kanoh, chairman of its parent company Fuji Media Holdings, both resigned effective immediately. As a result, Kenji Shimizu was appointed as the new president. During this press conference, Fuji TV stated that they still believed that the executive played no part in the incident, with the person having submitted evidence to back it up. According to Fuji TV, Nakai also said that the executive played no part.

On March 31, 2025, the third-party committee established by Fuji Television and Fuji Media Holdings, chaired by Akira Takeuchi concluded, based on hearings with both the woman and Nakai, that an act of sexual violence had occurred according to World Health Organization standards. The committee stated that its conclusion was based on the content and demeanor of both parties' testimonies.

=== Rebuttal by the Nakai legal team to the third-party committee ===
On May 12, 2025, Nakai's attorney submitted an official statement to the third-party committee, asserting that Nakai had not engaged in what is commonly understood as sexual violence, and requested the disclosure of evidence in order to protect his human rights.

Based on a detailed internal interview conducted with Nakai, the legal team asserted that "there was no confirmation of any violent or coercive sexual acts as commonly understood by the term 'sexual violence' in Japanese." The team criticized the committee for adopting the World Health Organization’s broad definition of sexual violence, which includes "any sexual act, attempt to obtain a sexual act, unwanted sexual comments or advances, or acts to traffic or otherwise directed against a person’s sexuality using coercion, by any person regardless of their relationship to the victim, in any setting, including but not limited to home and work." Nakai's legal team argued that this standard lacked neutrality and equity, and that it severely damaged Nakai's personal honor and social status.

The trouble had already been settled privately between Nakai and the woman involved, and both parties were bound by a confidentiality agreement. On March 31, the third-party committee stated that the woman agreed to lift the confidentiality, while Nakai refused. However, according to his legal team, Nakai had in fact also proposed lifting confidentiality obligations to facilitate the investigation. However, the committee reportedly responded that "what happened in the private room between the two individuals was not the direct subject of the investigation." Nakai cooperated with the hearing for approximately six hours, but according to his attorney, his statements were scarcely reflected in the final report.

Nakai's legal team criticized the third-party committee for shifting the scope of its investigation without proper notice. Although the committee had initially stated that "what happened in the private room was not the direct subject of the investigation" and that events before and after were more relevant, it ultimately focused on the incident itself and unilaterally concluded that sexual violence had occurred. The legal team described this as a deceptive change of investigative scope without sufficient verification procedures, equating it to an foul play that violated principles of impartial fact-finding.

On June 3, the committee informed Nakai's legal team that it would refrain from further communication, citing concerns over potential secondary harm to the victim.

On July 5, Nakai's legal team criticized the third-party committee's handling of the case, arguing that the committee, unlike a court or law enforcement body, unilaterally labeled Nakai a perpetrator of sexual violence based on confirmation biased materials and one-sided hearings. They stated that Nakai was denied the opportunity to explain or defend himself, and that the process lacked any formal mechanisms for appeal or redress, leaving his reputation damaged without means of recovery. Despite repeated requests for clarification, the committee allegedly failed to respond substantively. Additionally, the legal team claimed that some of the committee's questioning—such as inquiries about Nakai's reasons for dining with women—constituted sexual harassment.

Furthermore, the legal team pointed out a possible information leak involving the third-party committee. digital forensic investigation reportedly uncovered traces suggesting that the report had been shared in advance with a third party identified as "A&S," and that the report was later replaced with a version from which these traces had been deleted. The legal team also raised concerns over a possible conflict of interest, noting that one member of the third-party committee served as an outside auditor for a company that places commercials on Fuji TV. It was also revealed that the company had suspended its commercials on Fuji shortly before the third-party committee was established. "A&S" refers to Atsumi & Sakai, a law firm where attorney Saori Hanada, who serves on the boards of Fuji Television and its parent company Fuji Media Holdings, is affiliated.

In response, the third-party committee issued a statement on July 7 denying any involvement, explaining that when the Fuji third-party committee was drafting the investigation report, the name "A&S" had remained in the author field of a microsoft Word file previously used by a committee member during earlier work with the same law firm, and that this name was unintentionally carried over into the PDF version of the published report.

=== Possible return ===
One year after being recognized as a sexual abuser, in an interview done by Josei Jishin, Nakai confirmed that he has been receiving several offers of work (one of them by long–time acquaintance Hitoshi Matsumoto). Though Nakai denies the possibility of ever returning, there could be an appearance in Matsumoto's group's streaming service, Downtown+. Nakai, who has been living a reclusive life since mid–year 2025, could appear there or in YouTube if he chose to.

== Life after retirement ==
On August 6, 2026, it was reported by Josei Seven that Nakai had been involved providing support for the Kumamoto area following the earthquake. He has been providing support to disaster-stricken areas for nearly 30 years, and this fact has been a constant topic on social media. Regarding this news, Josei Seven contacted his lawyer, who reserved his answer for this and the reporter's question about the proceedings in the sexual abuse case, saying that he wasn't able to answer at the moment.

== Filmography ==
=== Television (as personality) ===
Year	Title	Role	Notes	Ref(s).
1994–2014	Waratte Iitomo!	Himself		
1995–2000	Sunday Jungle	Himself (sports commentator)		
1996–1998	Nakai kun Onsen	Himself (host)		
1996–2010	Utaban	Himself (host)		
1996–2016	SMAPxSMAP	Himself (host, performer)		
1996–2016	FNS Day: 27 Hour Television	Himself (host)	TV special; 10 episodes	
1996–2018	Mecha-Mecha Iketeru!	Himself (host)	TV special	
1997–1998	Beat Takeshi's D-1 Grand Prix	Himself (host)	TV special; 3 episodes	
1997–2009	Kouhaku Uta Gassen	Himself (host)	TV special; 6 episodes	
1998–2002	SataSma	Himself (host)		
2000–2016	Sanma Nakai Konya mo Nemurenai	Himself (host)	TV special; 17 episodes (as a "27 Hour Television" corner)	
2001–2025	The! Sekai Gyoten News	Himself (moderator)	Documentary-style variety show (NTV)	
2001–2025	Kinyoubi no Smiletachi e	Himself (host)	Information variety show (TBS)	
2002	Deli!Sma	Himself (host)		
2002–2003	Matsumoto Hitoshi Nakai Masahiro VS Nihon TV	Himself (host)	TV special; 2 episodes ("Motte ku? 1000 Man en!", "Dai 2-dan wa asa made 200-pon shōbuda!")	
2002–2004	Wakachuki	Himself (host)	(named "Wakarete mo chuukina hito" (わかれてもちゅきなひと) until 2003)	
2003	SmaO	Himself (host)	(substituted Deli!Sma)	
2004–2013	Nakai Masahiro no Black Variety	Himself (host)		
2004–2024	Olympic Games	Himself (host, newscaster)		
2006–2009	Super Drama Festival	Himself (host)	TV special; 7 episodes	
2007–2016	Baby Smap	Himself (as SMAP member) (host)	From 2007 to September 2011, others contributed the content, with a boy dressed as Nakai appearing in every episode, while serving as promotional for SMAP×SMAP. Starting in October 2011 until the end, SMAP were main cast, with the program centered in showing old and unaired clips from the show.	
2007–2024	World Baseball Entertainment Tamacchi!	Himself (host)	TV special	
2008–2012	The Dainenpyou	Himself (host)	TV special; 7 episodes	
2008–2022	Nakai Masahiro no Maru Shoubu	Himself (host)	TV special; 14 episodes and a special	
2010	The Music Hour	Himself (host)		
2010–2013	Sekai wa Sugee Koko made Shirabemashita	Himself (host)	TV special; 6 episodes	
2010–2012, 2018, 2019	CDTV Special	Himself (host, performer)	TV special: 6 episodes (2010–2012, 2018 New Year's Live, 2019 (25th Anniversary Special))	
2010	Draft Kinkyu Namatokuban Okasan Arigato	Himself (host)	TV special; 6 episodes	
2010	Baseball Chin-play Ko-play Taisho	Himself (host)	TV special: 6 episodes	
2011–2012	Coming Soon	Himself (host)		
2011–2012	Tamori Nakai Dramatic Living Room	Himself (host)	TV special; 3 episodes	
2011–2013	Ayashii Uwasa no Atsumaru Toshokan	Himself (host)		
2011–2025	Ongaku no Hi	Himself (host, performer)	TV special	
2011–2025	Nakai no Kakezan	Himself (host)	TV special; 6 episodes	
2012–2013	Kayoukyoku!	Himself (host)		
2012–2016	Shinsai kara maru–nen "ashita e" konsāto	Himself (host, performer)	TV special	
2012	Nakai no Mado	Himself (host)		
2012	Nodojiman The World	Himself (host)	TV special; 13 episodes	
2013–2014	Sound Room	Himself (host)		
2013–2025	Mi ni Naru Toshokan	Himself (host)		
2013–2025	Wide Na Show	Himself (commentator)		
2014–2015	UTAGE!	Himself (host, performer)	Music variety show (TBS)	
2014–2015	TV Asahi SMAP Variety bu SmaShip (テレ朝SMAPバラエティ部 スマシプ!)	Himself (host)	TV special; 2 episodes	
2014-	Sports! Gogai Scoop Neraimasu (2014–2019, 2021 (Olympics special))	Himself (host)	TV special (TV Asahi)	
2015	NHK Nodojiman	Himself (host)		
2015–2017	Momm!!	Himself (host)	Music variety show (TBS)	
2015–2017	Nakai Masahiro no Kami Sense Shio Sense	Himself (host)	TV special; 6 episodes (Fuji)	
2016-2022	Utage Special	Himself (host)	Music variety show specials (Spring (1), Summer (4), Autumn (2), Summer and Autumn (1), New Year's (2), Valentine's (1) and non-seasonal (2)) (TBS)	
2019–2021	Shin Nihon Danji to Nakai	Himself	Talk show (NTV)	
2019–2025	Nakai Masahiro no doyōbina kai	Himself (host)	News program (TV Asahi)	
2020–2025	Matsumoto Nakai	Himself (host)	Variety (Fuji TV) (renamed "Dareka to Nakai" on 4 February 2024)	
2022–2023	The purachina risuto ~ sutā ga umareta densetsu no meibo ~	Himself (host)	Variety (TBS). Co-hosted with Hiromi	

=== Television (as actor) ===
Year	Title	Role	Notes	Ref
1988–1989	Abunai Shonen III	Himself	Main role	
1989	Jikan Desuyo Heisei Gannen	Hiroshi Takarada		
1991	Let's go to School	Katsumi Matsuda		
1992	Motto, Tokimeki wo – Futari made no kyori – (もっと、ときめきを－ふたりまでの距離－)	Himself	Guest appearance	
1993	Aiyo Nemuranaide (愛よ眠らないで)	Mamoru Koga		
1993	Ude ni Oboeari 3	Yunosuke Shibutani		
1995	Yonimo Kimyou na Monogatari – Aki no tokubetsu-hen (1995-nen)	Kazuyuki Oida	Main role	
1995–2013	Aji Ichimonme	Satoru Ibashi	Main role	
1995	Kagayaku Kisetsu no Naka de	Shinichi Higuchi		
1995	Kagayake Rintaro	Himself	Cameo; 2 episodes	
1996	Dareka ga Dareka ni Koishiteru	Kentaro Ishida	Main role	
1996	Yonimo Kimyou na Monogatari	Okada	Main role	
1996	Shori no Megami	Kohei Yoshimoto	Main role	
1996–2015	Naniwa Kinyudo	Tatsuyuki Haibara	Main role	
1997	Boku ga Boku de Arutame ni	Hayato Narise	Main role	
1997	Ii Hito	Himself	Cameo appearance	
1997	Saigo no Koi	Toru Natsume	Main role	
1998	Brothers	Shinjin Fujiwara	Main role	
1999	Furuhata Ninzaburo vs SMAP	Himself	Main role	
1999	Good News	Bunichi Kurosawa	Main role	
2000	Densetsu no Kyoushi	Daisuke Kazama	Main role	
2000	Sazae-san	Man (voice)	Cameo appearance; episode 4550	
2001	Yonimo Kimyo na Monogatari	Yoji Sagara	Main role	
2001–2003	Shiroi Kage	Yosuke Naoe	Main role	
2004	Suna no Utsuwa	Eiryo Waga	Main role	
2004	X’smap	Jyunsa	Main role	
2004	Sazae-san	Man at hospital (voice)	Cameo appearance; episode 5456	
2009	Konkatsu	Kuniyuki Amamiya	Main role	
2010	Dokutomato Satsujin Jiken	Himself	Main role	
2011	Sazae-san	Himself (voice)	Cameo appearance	
2012–2013	Ataru	Ataru "Chokozai" Inoguchi	Main role	
2013	Furuhata vs SMAP The Aftermath	Himself	Main role	
2014	Oretachi ni Asu wa aru	Himself	Main role	
2014	Sazae-san	Himself (voice)	Cameo appearance; episode 7148	
2015	Zeni no Sensou	Tatsuyuki Haibara	Guest appearance; 1 episode	
2015	Sazae-san	Himself (voice)	Cameo appearance; episode 7323	

=== Film ===
Year	Title	Role	Notes
1993	Private Lesson	Koji Kaneko	Guest appearance
1994	Shoot	Toshihiko Tanaka	Main role
2002	Mohō Han	Koichi Amikawa	Main role
2008	Watashi wa Kai ni Naritai	Toyomatsu Shimizu	Main role
2010	Ototo	Himself	Cameo
2013	Ataru The First Love & The Last Kill	Zai Inoguchi	Main role
2016	Te wo Tsunaide Kaerouyo	Koji Soga	Guest appearance

=== Radio ===
Year	Title	Role	Notes
1992–2009	Ohayo SMAP	Himself	
1993–1994	All Night Nippon	Himself	
1995–2016	Some Girl' SMAP	Himself	
2017–2025	Masahiro Nakai ON & ON AIR	Himself	

=== Theatre ===
Year	Title	Role	Notes
1991	Saint Seiya	Pegasus Seiya	Main role
1992	Dragon Quest		Main role
1993	Another		Main role

== Awards and nominations ==
Year	Organization	Award	Work	Result
1995	4th Television Drama Academy Awards	Best Actor	Aji Ichimonme	Won
1995	4th Television Drama Academy Awards	Best Newcomer	Aji Ichimonme	Won
1995	5th Television Drama Academy Awards	Best Supporting Actor	Kagayaku Kisetsu no Naka de	Nominated
1996	8th Television Drama Academy Awards	Best Actor	Aji Ichimonme 2	Nominated
1997	14th Television Drama Academy Awards	Best Actor	Saigo no Koi	Won
1998	17th Television Drama Academy Awards	Best Actor	Brothers	Nominated
2001	28th Television Drama Academy Awards	Best Actor	Shiroi Kage	Nominated
2003	7th Nikkan Sports Drama Grand Prix	Best Actor	Suna no Utsuwa	Won
2004	40th Television Drama Academy Awards	Best Actor	Suna no Utsuwa	Won
2004	14th TV Life Annual Drama Awards	Best Actor	Suna no Utsuwa	Won
2004	1st TV Navi Drama of the Year	Best performance (Leading role)	Suna no Utsuwa	Won
2008	21st Nikkan Sports Film Awards	Best Actor	Watashi wa Kai ni Naritai	Won
2012	73rd Television Drama Academy Awards	Best Actor	Ataru	Nominated

== Honors ==
Year	Award	Note	Ref.
2021	Medal with Dark blue ribbon	Awards from private donations	
2022	Medal with Dark blue ribbon	Awards from private donations	
2023	Medal with Dark blue ribbon	Awards from private donations	

== Publications ==
- Music Clamp: SMAP MIND Vol.1 (1997) ISBN 978-4-87728-151-9
- Music Clamp: SMAP MIND Vol.2 (1997) ISBN 978-4-87728-160-1
- Music Clamp: SMAP MIND Vol.3 (1997) ISBN 978-4-87728-176-2
- Music Clamp: SMAP MIND Vol.4 (1997) ISBN 978-4-87728-177-9
- Shifuku Darake no Nakai Masahiro Zokango Kagayaite (August 18, 2009) ISBN 978-4594060183
- Shifuku Darake no Nakai Masahiro Zokango Kagayaite Part2 (December 11, 2012) ISBN 978-4594067335
- Shifuku Darake no Nakai Masahiro Zokango Kagayaite Part3 (January 15, 2013) ISBN 978-4594067403
- Shifuku Darake no Nakai Masahiro Zokango Kagayaite Part4 (April 18, 2014) ISBN 978-4594070342
