= NHK Nodo Jiman =

TV program broadcast on NHK TV and NHK radio in Japan

- Presented by: Tomomi Hirose (2023-present); Naoki Ninomiya (2023-present); Sen Odagiri (2013-2023); Kazuya Matsumoto (2010-2011); Akira Tokuda (2007-2010, 2011-2013); Ryuji Miyamoto (2005-2007); Yasuo Miyakawa (1993-2005); Keiichi Yoshikawa (1987-1993); Tatsuo Kaneko (1970-1987)
- Composer: Kunihiko Suzuki (Theme song)
- Country of origin: Japan

Production
- Production locations: Various locations NHK Hall (Annual championship)
- Running time: 45 minutes

Original release
- Network: NHK General TV, NHK AM, NHK World Premium
- Release: January 19, 1946 (radio); March 15, 1953 (TV)

NHK Nodo Jiman (Japanese: NHKのど自慢), also known by its English title as NHK Amateur Singing Contest, is a long-running TV program broadcast on NHK TV and NHK radio in Japan.

== History ==
Nodo Jiman ("Proud of my voice") features amateur singers who live in the locality where the competition is held. The first competition was held on the radio in 1946, just after the end of World War II. It has been featured in two Japanese movies.

Nodo Jiman celebrated its 70th anniversary in 2015. Boy band SMAP became an integral part of the celebrations, making guest appearances throughout the year. Band member Shingo Katori served as a "special MC" alongside regular presenter Sen Odagiri on the 12 April broadcast.

== Overview ==
=== Regular Show ===
Each week Nodo Jiman is broadcast from a different city in one of Japan's 47 prefectures; at the beginning of the show the host would announce the local venue in which the live broadcast is held, then describe the landmarks and culture of the prefecture and city hosting the broadcast.

20 contestants - each of them a solo singer, a duet, or a group of three or more - perform in each week's competition. After being introduced by the host (usually by stating his or her occupation), each contestant states his or her participation number and the name of the song he or she is performing, then has about one minute to perform. At the end of the minute, a certain number of bells are rung to rate the performance. One or two bells means the contestant sang poorly and is eliminated, while a melody of eleven bells means the contestant sang well enough and has passed.

Two special guests - well-known artists in the Japanese recording industry - appear during each broadcast. They interact with the contestants and give feedback on their performances. After all the contestants have performed, each guest performs one of his or her best songs.

Near the end of the broadcast, one of the guests presents a "special award" (特別賞, tokubetsu-shō) to one of the eliminated contestants whose performance was thought to be memorable or interesting. Finally, all of the contestants who have passed are called to center stage, and the most outstanding of these is declared "this week's champion" (今週のチャンピオン, konshū no chanpion).

=== Annual Championship ===
Every year, early March, about 15 of the best "Champions" performances the year before perform again, this time at NHK Hall, to define who will be the "Grand Champion" of the year. The annual edition entitled "NHK Nodojiman: Champion Tournament" features three special guests and The New Breed performing the live soundtrack.

=== Personnel ===
Regular Cast

- Sen Odagiri (Current host)
- Kisei Akiyama (Tubular Bells player)
- The New Breed (Live soundtrack on Annual Championship)
