= Smap Vest =

Greatest hits album by SMAP
- Released: 23 March 2001
- Recorded: 1991–2000
- Length: 2:26:51
- Language: Japanese
- Label: Victor Entertainment

SMAP chronology
S Map: SMAP 014 (2000)	Smap Vest (2001)	Pams (2001)

Smap Vest is the third greatest hits album by Japanese boy band SMAP. It was released on 23 March 2001 through Victor Entertainment. It includes all of the band's singles from 1991 through 2000. The album debuted at number one on the Oricon Albums Chart, selling 1,005,000 copies in its first week. In April 2001, it was certified Quadruple Platinum by the Recording Industry Association of Japan for shipments of 1,600,000 units. Smap Vest was the seventh best-selling album of 2001 in Japan, with over 1,679,000 copies sold by the end of the year. It is the band's highest-selling album. As of December 2016, the album has sold 1,827,000 copies in Japan.

The album won the Japan Gold Disc Award for Pop Album of the Year at the 16th Japan Gold Disc Awards.

== Track listing ==
Disc 1
No.	Title	Lyrics	Music	Arrangement	Length
1.	"Lion Heart"	Shinji Nojima	Minoru Komorita	Komorita	4:22
2.	"Let It Be"	Takeshi Aida	Face 2 Fake	Face 2 Fake	4:11
3.	"Fly"	Yukari Miwa	Hisatsugu Noto	Yūzō Oka	4:58
4.	"Asahi o Mi ni Ikō yo"	Shinji Yasuda	Yasuda	Chokkaku	5:06
5.	"Taisetsu"	Masami Tozawa	Komorita	Seikō Nagaoka	3:57
6.	"Yozora no Mukō"	Shikao Suga	Yuka Kawamura	Chokkaku	4:34
7.	"Peace!"	Masumi Iizuka	Face 2 Fake	Nagaoka	4:42
8.	"Celery"	Masayoshi Yamazaki	Yamazaki	Nobuyuki Shimizu	4:04
9.	"Dynamite"	Hiromi Mori	Komorita	Komorita	4:49
10.	"Shake"	Mori	Komorita	Chokkaku	4:22
11.	"Aoi Inazuma"	Mori; Candee H.	Kenji Hayashida	Chokkaku; Kumi Sasaki	4:38
12.	"Hadaka no Ōsama (Shibutoku Tsuyoku)"	Mori	Kenichi Shōno	Shōno; Masayuki Iwata	3:58
13.	"Munesawagi o Tanomu yo"	Tozawa	Ichirō Terada	Chokkaku; Iwata	5:18
14.	"Oretachi ni Asu wa Aru"	Aida	Iwata	Iwata	4:17
15.	"Donna Ii Koto"	Kōhei Ōkura	Shōno	Shōno; Iwata	4:22
16.	"Shiyō yo"	Mori	Kōji Makaino	Chokkaku; Iwata	4:45
Total length:					1:12:31

Disc 2
No.	Title	Lyrics	Music	Arrangement	Length
1.	"Kansha Shite"	Tozawa	Hayashida	Shimizu; Candee H.	4:19
2.	"Tabun Alright"	Megumi Ogura	Shōno	Shōno; Iwata	4:36
3.	"Ganbarimashō"	Ogura	Shōno	Shōno	3:48
4.	"Original Smile"	Mori	Makaino	Chokkaku	5:06
5.	"Hey Hey Ōki ni Maido Ari"	Shōno; Michiko Enoki	Shōno	Shōno	3:37
6.	"Kimi Iro Omoi"	Hayashida	Hayashida	Chokkaku; Kazuo Shiina	4:43
7.	"$10"	Hayashida; Mori	Hayashida	Hayashida; Chokkaku	4:27
8.	"Kimi wa Kimi da yo"	Ogura	Shin Tanimoto	Tōru Shigemi	4:39
9.	"Hajimete no Natsu"	Mori	Makaino	Nagaoka; Makoto Matsushita	4:52
10.	"Zutto Wasurenai"	Mori	Makaino	Nagaoka	5:53
11.	"Yuki ga Futtekita"	Mori	Makaino	Nagaoka; Matsushita	5:05
12.	"Egao no Genki"	Mori	Makaino	Motoki Funayama	4:32
13.	"Makeru na Baby! Never Give Up"	Aida	Kyōhei Tsutsumi	Chokkaku	3:57
14.	"Kokoro no Kagami"	Yūko Fukushima	Tsutsumi	Takayuki Hijikata	4:14
15.	"Seigi no Mikata wa Ate ni Naranai"	Ogura	Makaino	Hiroshi Shinkawa	5:15
16.	"Can't Stop!! (Loving)"	Mori	Makaino	Funayama	5:09
Total length:					1:14:20
