= SMAP×SMAP =

- Also known as: SmaSma (suma-suma)
- Genre: Variety show
- Starring: SMAP
- Music by: SMAP
- Opening theme: "Otherside"
- Ending theme: "Not Alone ~Shiawase ni Narō yo~"
- Country of origin: Japan
- Original language: Japanese
- No. of episodes: 920

Production
- Production location: Wangan Studio (Tokyo)
- Camera setup: Multiple
- Running time: 54 minutes (with commercials)
- Production companies: Kansai TV; Fuji Television

Original release
- Network: FNS (Fuji TV, Kansai TV)
- Release: April 15, 1996 – December 26, 2016

Related
- Baby Smap

SMAP×SMAP, often referred to simply as Sma-Sma, is a Japanese television variety show hosted by boy band SMAP. Debuting on April 15, 1996, it was produced by Kansai TV and Fuji TV and aired on Fuji TV and its affiliates every Monday from 10:00 p.m. to 10:54 p.m. (JST) until it ended on December 26, 2016.

Since its premiere, the show has been critically acclaimed for its originality and unique, distinct format and has become an iconic television show in Japan. It quickly became the most watched television program, attracting an average of 20 million viewers per episode, often ranking at #1 in year-end ratings. It has become the show that features the widest range of guests in Japanese television history, including actors, singers, models, athletes, filmmakers, and politicians, both Japanese and from abroad. It is the eighth longest-running prime-time television program in Japan and the second longest-running prime-time television program on Fuji Television.

== History ==
From April 10, 1995, SMAP began starring in their variety show, SMAP no Gambarimashou, which aired every weeknights, until September 29, 1995. It consisted of interviews with celebrities, sketch comedies, and musical performances. The program's format became the basis for their new variety show, SMAPxSMAP, and served as its predecessor. SMAPxSMAP was launched six months after Gambarimashou ended and became the band's first television program on a prime-time slot.

The title of the program was derived from the film New York, New York (1977). The first episode aired on April 15, 1996. Mori later announced his departure from the band and SMAP made their last television appearance as a six-piece on May 27, 1996, in a special episode dedicated to Mori. From then on, the band has hosted the show as a five-piece.

== Format ==
Each episode is usually composed of three segments, "Bistro SMAP", a second segment which varies every week, and "S-Live".

=== Bistro SMAP ===
A cooking-themed interview segment, which airs during the first half of the program, usually lasting from 25 to 30 minutes. It has been airing from the first episode since the program's launch in 1996.

The set is of a two-story restaurant, a kitchen on the ground floor and a dining room on the top. Nakai plays the role of the manager of the restaurant, serving as the host of the segment. Kimura, Inagaki, Kusanagi, and Katori are divided into two teams and play the role of the chefs. Nakai first asks the guest's name in which they made their reservation and brings him or her to the table. The segment's premise appears on the screen:

"Bistro SMAP does not have a menu. We cook any dish that our guest desires."

After asking what the guest would like to eat, Nakai rings a small bell and says, "Order! xxx (name of the meal)". The four members in the kitchen answer, "Oui Monsieur!", meaning "Yes, sir" in French, and begin to cook. Nakai interviews the guest while the chefs cook a full-course meal. Once they are done cooking, Nakai leads the guest to the kitchen and the chefs join Nakai and interviews the guest or play a little game. They all then go back to the dining room and let the guest have their meal made by the two teams. Once the guest is finished eating, he/she chooses the winner. Female guests give the winning team members a kiss on the cheek and male guests usually give the winners a gift as a reward.

Comedy skit: While the guest is having the food cooked by the team that Katori isn't in, Katori goes backstage to change into a different costume for a short comedy skit. Nakai asks how the food is and the guest answers, "Oishii desu", meaning "It's delicious". Nakai shouts, "Oishii! (Delicious!)" and Katori comes back to the set and performs a skit, usually related to the guest or the film, television series, or music the guest is promoting.

In the first few episodes when SMAP was a six-piece, the chefs were played by Kimura, Mori, Inagaki, and Kusanagi, and Katori played the role of the waiter. Katori joined to play one of the chefs after Mori's departure from the band. The segment was initially created to show off Mori's cooking skills, although they decided to continue the segment after his departure.

International guests include: Will Smith, Brad Pitt, Robert De Niro, Tom Hanks, Hugh Jackman, Richard Gere, Harrison Ford, Nicolas Cage, Arnold Schwarzenegger, Denzel Washington, Whoopi Goldberg, Cameron Diaz, Paris Hilton, Jane Birkin, Amanda Seyfried, Miranda Kerr, Steven Spielberg, Quentin Tarantino, David Beckham, Neymar, Usain Bolt, Mikhail Gorbachev, etc.

=== Sketch comedy and games ===
The second segment varies every week and lasts from 15 to 25 minutes. The band members usually participate in sketch comedies and games. Sketch comedies include both originals and parodies of popular films and television series.

International guests include: Madonna, Janet Jackson, Destiny's Child, Cameron Diaz, Sarah Jessica Parker, Will Smith, Jaden Smith, Ashton Kutcher, Tom Cruise, etc.

=== S-Live ===
A musical segment, which airs at the end of the program, usually lasting about 5 minutes. It has been airing from the first episode since the program's launch in 1996, along with Bistro SMAP.

There are three types of musical performances. One is an act by SMAP alone singing their own songs, which happens especially when they release a new single or an album. Another is SMAP covering other artists' songs. A third type is a collaboration with other artists, where they have a musical guest and perform their songs together.

The End Talk: S-Live ends with a one-minute long segment called The End Talk, which is taped after shooting the musical performance. The band looks back on the performance they have just done and briefly interviews the guest. On episodes they do not have a musical guest, The End Talk is done by the band alone and the length of the segment is longer than usual, often answering questions from the fans they get through the program's website.

International guests include: Michael Jackson, Bon Jovi, James Brown, Stevie Wonder, Justin Bieber, Backstreet Boys, The Black Eyed Peas, Maroon 5, Earth, Wind & Fire, Lady Gaga, Beyoncé, Taylor Swift, Ariana Grande, Mariah Carey, Katy Perry, etc.

== Episodes ==
Year	First episode	Last episode	Number of episodes
1996	April 15	December 30	35
1997	January 13	December 29	46
1998	January 12	December 28	44
1999	January 11	December 27	45
2000	January 3	December 25	48
2001	January 8	December 24	47
2002	January 7	December 30	49
2003	January 6	December 29	49
2004	January 12	December 27	47
2005	January 17	December 26	47
2006	January 9	December 25	47
2007	January 1	December 24	48
2008	January 14	December 29	47
2009	January 12	December 14	42
2010	January 4	December 20	41
2011	January 10	December 19	43
2012	January 9	December 24	45
2013	January 7	December 23	46
2014	January 6	December 22	45
2015	January 5	December 14	43
2016	January 11	December 26	26

== Special episodes ==
=== Love Awards ===
The Love Awards honor the best clips of the year with scenes that never aired on the program.

=== S-1 Grand Prix ===
The S-1 Grand Prix features a series of games with the losing team playing a punishment game.

=== SMAP×SMAP MEMORIES FILE Final ===
The last episode of the series features clips from the show's twenty-year run aired on December 26, 2016 at 18:30 JST

== Notable episodes ==
=== Highest-rated episode ===
After Inagaki's temporary hiatus in 2001, SMAP made their first television appearance as a five-piece for the first time in six months. A live episode welcoming back Inagaki aired on January 14, 2002, which eventually became the highest-rated episode of SMAPxSMAP, with 34.2 million viewers. The episode also is ranked at #7 for the most watched Japanese variety show in history.

=== Michael Jackson's appearance ===
On June 5, 2006, Michael Jackson made a surprise guest appearance. During the taping of the program's musical segment, S-Live, Jackson appeared on the set and visited SMAP. Chairs were brought in and the six of them made a brief conversation, along with a translator. The episode also aired footage of Jackson watching the band's performance in the production control room backstage, before he made his appearance on the set. Jackson promised SMAP that he would make an official guest appearance on the program the next time he was in Japan, though that did not come true, due to his death in 2009. SMAP was later invited to Michael Jackson's This Is It's world premiere, after having recorded Jackson's last television appearance.

=== SMAP's First Trip ===
On April 8, 2013, a three-hour-long special entitled, SMAP's First Trip aired in celebration of the band's 25th anniversary since its formation in 1988. The band was given a three-day break to take a trip as a group, without an itinerary, allowing the members to do whatever they wanted. The episode became one of the most highest-rated television programs aired that year, marking above the 20% household share.

=== 50 Singles 40-minute Nonstop Special ===
On September 9, 2013, the same day SMAP's debut single was released in 1991, a special episode entitled, 50 Singles 40-minute Nonstop Special was aired. The band performed all of their past fifty singles in a medley, nonstop for forty minutes, without a break and without any commercials.

== Theme Songs ==
- 1996: Blue Thunder, SHAKE
- 1997: Dynamite, Peace!
- 1998: Beyond the Night Sky
- 1999: Let's Go See the Sunrise
- 2000: Let It Be
- 2002: freebird
- 2010: This is love
- 2011: Half of Me
- 2013: Mistake!
- 2014: Top Of The World
- 2015: Otherside

== Related shows ==
Baby Smap is a five-minute-long spin-off or sidequel of SMAPxSMAP that has been airing on Sunday nights at 1:30 a.m. from April 15, 2007.

The program mainly features unaired scenes from SMAPxSMAP and scenes from next week's episode. Occasionally, the program is subtitled "New Project Factory" and SMAP members appear on the show, participating in the taping of short games. It was originally created to let young, rookie or "baby" television producers come up with ideas for a new segment for SMAPxSMAP. At the end of the program, SMAP members decide if the game can be used as a new segment on SMAPxSMAP.

== Production information ==
=== Taping ===
From 1996 to 2007, taping took place at studio A2 at TMC Studios in Setagaya, Tokyo. From 2007, it is taped at the Wangan Studio in Koto, Tokyo.

Taping generally takes place on Wednesdays and Thursdays in front of a live audience, except sketch comedies and the musical segment S-Live, which are shot without a studio audience. Two out of the three segments aired in a single episode, are taped in one day.

Taping often goes on past midnight until early morning, depending on the schedules of the SMAP members.
