= Super Modern Artistic Performance =

super.modern.artistic.performance

Studio album by SMAP
- Released: September 24, 2008 (Japan)
- Genre: J-pop, R&B, bubblegum pop, dance, electropop, jazz, pop-rock
- Length: 59:55 (Disc 1); 22:33 (Disc 2)
- Label: Victor Entertainment
- Producer: Johnny Kitagawa, will.i.am, Monkey Majik, Yasutaka Nakata, Jinyoung "JYP" Park

SMAP chronology
Pop Up! SMAP (2006)	super.modern.artistic.performance (2008)	We Are SMAP! (2010)

Singles from super.modern.artistic.performance
- 1. "Sonomama" Released: March 5, 2008; 2. "Kono Toki, Kitto Yume ja Nai" Released: August 13, 2008

Super Modern Artistic Performance (stylized as super.modern.artistic.performance) is the eighteenth studio album of Japanese boy band SMAP, released on September 24, 2008 by Victor Entertainment in Japan. The album features work from Japanese-Canadian pop-rock band Monkey Majik, Korean singer-songwriter Park Jin-young, Japanese electronic musician and Capsule member Yasutaka Nakata and Black Eyed Peas member will.i.am. The album debuted and peaked at number one in the Oricon Weekly Charts with 214,000 units sold on its first week of release and is certified Platinum by the RIAJ. This has made SMAP achieved total album sales of ten million, being the second musical group of vocalists after Chage and Aska to achieve the sales total.

== Track listing ==
- Disc 1
1. Theme of 019 super.modern.artistic.performance
2. この瞬間、きっと夢じゃない
3. Jazz
4. Love Loser
5. あなたのためにできること
6. Keep On
7. Mermaid
8. ひとつだけの愛〜アベ・マリア
9. はじまりのうた
10. ココロパズルリズム
11. そのまま
12. Last Smile
13. Still U
14. どうか届きますように
- Disc 2
1. 宮下がつくったうた
2. Style
3. Life Walker
4. ソウデス!
5. Here Is Your Hit

== Charts, sales and certifications ==
=== Charts ===
Chart	Peak position
Oricon Daily albums	1
Oricon Weekly albums	1
Oricon Yearly albums	38

=== Sales and certification ===
Chart	Amount
Oricon physical sales	259,725+
RIAJ physical shipping certification	Platinum (250,000+)
