= SMAP =

Japanese idol group (1988–2016)

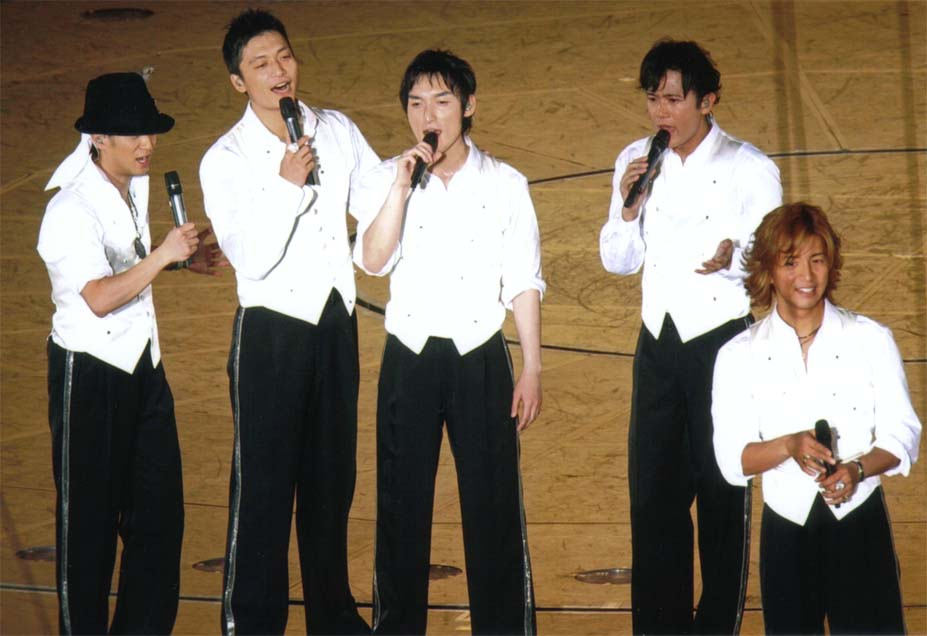
- SMAP on tour in 2008, from Left to Right: Masahiro Nakai, Shingo Katori. Tsuyoshi Kusanagi, Goro Inagaki, Takuya Kimura

Background information
- Origin: Japan
- Genres: J-pop; R&B
- Years active: 1988–2016
- Label: Victor Entertainment
- Past members: Masahiro Nakai; Takuya Kimura; Goro Inagaki; Tsuyoshi Kusanagi; Shingo Katori; Katsuyuki Mori

SMAP (Japanese: スマップ, Hepburn: Sumappu) was a Japanese boy band, composed of Masahiro Nakai, Takuya Kimura, Goro Inagaki, Tsuyoshi Kusanagi, and Shingo Katori. The group was created in 1988 by music producer Johnny Kitagawa, founder of Johnny & Associates, originally as a six-piece with Katsuyuki Mori, until his departure from the band in 1996. The name stands for "Sports Music Assemble People". After making their debut in 1991, the group took the Japanese entertainment industry by storm, becoming one of the most successful boy bands in Asia. The group is often referred to as a "national treasure" and a "fortune and property of the country" in Japan.

SMAP was regarded as an iconic group in Japan, after achieving an unprecedented level of success in numerous genres in the entertainment industry, including music, television, film, radio, and theater, as a group and individually. SMAP was credited for changing the Japanese entertainment and music industry, in terms of prolonging longevity of boy bands and broadening careers by creating new opportunities for bands that followed. After starting out as a typical boy band, with a fan base predominantly of female teens, they gradually transformed into a band with a wider audience, expanding their fan base to preteens, male adults, and even the elderly, after their success as actors and television personalities.

SMAP released 55 singles, all of which reached the top 10 in the charts, 22 consecutive number-one singles, and 33 number-one singles in total. The band has had 24 top-10 albums and 14 number-one albums. "Sekai ni Hitotsu Dake no Hana", released in 2003, is the best selling single in the 21st century and the third best selling single in Japanese history and has become the most recognized song in Japan, as it appears in text books used in school and children are taught to learn the song at a young age. Other best selling singles by the group include, "Beyond the Night Sky", "Lion Heart", "Shake", "Aoi Inazuma", which also have become some of the most popular songs in Japan. Throughout their career, the band has sold over 38.5 million records in Japan alone.

In April 1996, the group launched their weekly variety show, SMAP×SMAP, which quickly gained high ratings and became one of the most famous television shows in Japan. The distinct format of the program has received widespread critical praise. The show ranked No. 1 in the annual household share ratings in 1996, 1997, 1999–2002, 2006, and 2016, making it the most watched television show in Japan. The episode that aired in January 2002 is currently ranked No. 7 for the most watched Japanese variety show in history, with 34.2 million viewers. It is the eighth longest-running prime-time television program in Japan, as of 2016.

SMAP officially disbanded on December 31, 2016.

== History ==
=== 1986–1991: Formation ===
In 1986, Masahiro Nakai (age 14), auditioned to enter Johnny & Associates, a Japanese talent agency that recruits and trains young boys, preteens to teens, to become singers and members of boy bands. Later, in 1987, Takuya Kimura (age 14), Goro Inagaki (age 13), Katsuyuki Mori (age 13), Tsuyoshi Kusanagi (age 12), and Shingo Katori (age 9) auditioned individually and joined the agency. In Autumn 1987, twenty boys, from ages ten to seventeen, were put together into a group called The Skate Boys, which was initially created as backup dancers for a famous boy band, Hikaru Genji. In April 1988, producer Johnny Kitagawa chose six out of the twenty boys to create a new boy band and named them "SMAP".

While the group continued to work as backup dancers for Hikaru Genji, they spent their early years as actors and television personalities. In 1988, they starred in a weekly variety program, Watto Atsumare, with Masataka Itsumi and Cha Kato and appeared regularly until the program ended several months later. In 1989, they started to host their own music show, Uta no Big Fight and Pop City X, as well as appearing regularly on a variety program, Idol Kyowakoku, from 1989 to 1991. In 1988, SMAP made their acting debut in a drama television series, Abunai Shonen III, playing themselves as the main role. Their first self-titled variety program, SMAP no Gakuen Kids, aired from 1990 to 1991.

=== 1991–1993: Debut and early years ===
On January 1, 1991, the band held their first concert in Nippon Budokan and their first tour from March through April, before releasing any music. On September 9, 1991, they released their first single, "Can't Stop -Loving-" from Victor Entertainment, which peaked at No. 2 on the charts. Subsequent singles, "Seigi no Mikata wa Ate ni Naranai", "Kokoro no Kagami", "Makeru na Baby" peaked in the top 10. The band asked the fans to write the lyrics for "Kokoro no Kagami", and the one submitted by a fourteen-year-old girl was chosen. The song was later used in a Panasonic television commercial. They were invited to perform the song at Kohaku Uta Gassen, an annual music show, on December 31, 1991.

At the same time of their debut, the Japanese music industry experienced what is frequently referred to as an "Idol Ice Age", where many of the popular music shows that aired weekly since the 1980s ended, and singers and bands lost a place to perform, resulting in scarce opportunities for TV exposure. Therefore, the agency decided to market the band through variety programs, where members participated in sketch comedies and game shows along with other television personalities. This non-mainstream marketing approach turned out to be a success, as the members' humorous and playful spirits on these shows propelled them to gain new fans, despite not having many musical performances on television since their debut.

In 1991, the band's first self-titled television show, SMAP no Gakuen Kids, got renewed and changed to, I Love SMAP, which aired until 1996. From October 7, 1991, Inagaki launched his radio program, Stop The SMAP, still airing as of 2016. From April 1992 to September 1995, the group appeared regularly on a weekly variety program, Yume ga Mori Mori. Due to the fact that this was the first time in Japanese history, that a band participated in a sketch comedy, this rare act attracted wide attention.

On January 1, 1992, they released their first album, SMAP 001, which peaked at No. 14 and released another album, SMAP 002, in the same year and peaked at No. 6. Their singles, "Egao no Genki", "Yuki ga Futtekita", "Zutto Wasurenai", "Hajimete no Natsu", "Kimi wa Kimi dayo", "$10", and "Kimi iro Omoi", released from 1992 through 1994, all peaked at the top 10. They headlined three tours in 1992, from January to August. In 1993, they released their third and fourth album, SMAP 003 and SMAP 004, which peaked at No. 11 and No. 3 respectively. In 1992, Inagaki starred in a drama television series, Hatachi no Yakusoku, as the main role. In 1993, Kimura starred in a drama television series, Asunaro Hakusho, which became a massive hit, with an average household share rating of 27% and 31.9% for the season finale. Kimura's popularity soared and from then on, members of the band started their acting careers individually.

=== 1994–1995: Breakthrough, "Gambarimashou", and SMAP 007 Gold Singer ===
In 1994, they released two albums, SMAP 005 and SMAP 006 Sexy Six, which both peaked at No. 2. On March 12, 1994, they released their 12th single, "Hey Hey Ookini Maidoari", which gave the band their first number one hit. Subsequent singles, "Original Smile", peaked at No. 2 and "Gambarimashou", and "Tabun Alright", reached number one. The two number-one singles became the band's ninth and tenth best selling single. "Gambarimashou" saw a jump in sales from the previous singles, becoming one of the most popular songs in Japan and helped the band gain a broader fan base. From 2002, "Original Smile" appeared on text books used in music classes in high school. From April 1994, Nakai and Katori started starring on the most famous Japanese daytime live television program, Waratte Iitomo. In October 1995, Kusanagi joined in and the three members appeared regularly for 20 years, Katori on Mondays, Nakai on Tuesdays, and Kusanagi on Fridays, until the program ended in 2014. From July to August, the band held their first large-scale tour, Sexy Six Show, hitting the three major cities in Japan. The tour was released on VHS on November 11, 1994, and later on DVD on December 24, 2003. On March 12, 1994, SMAP starred in their first film, Shoot!. The film aired on television for the first time on January 4, 2010, sixteen years after its release.

On January 1, 1995, the band released their first compilation album, Cool, which reached number one. The band gave an opportunity for fans to create the track list and the top fourteen of their favorite songs made it into the album. Singles released in 1995, "Kansha shite", "Shiyouyo", "Donna Iikoto", and "Oretachini Asu wa Aru", all reached number one on the charts, giving the band six consecutive number-one singles since "Gambarimasho" released in the previous year. "Oretachini Asu wa Aru" became the band's sixth best selling single. From January 1995, Kimura launched his weekly radio program, What's Up SMAP, still airing as of 2016. In January 1995, Nakai landed his first drama television series, Ajiichi Monme, which became an instant hit. Two seasons and four special episodes were made through 1995 to 2013. While he started to pursue his acting career, he also started to work individually as a television personality and as a news presenter, carrying many of his own television programs, which lead to expanding the capacity of a boy band.

From April 1995, the group launched a variety show, SMAP no Gambarimashou, derived from the single released the previous year, which aired on weeknights. The content of the show changed daily. On Mondays they performed a theatrical act, Tuesdays were talk show-based with a musical segment, on Wednesdays they aired a short TV movie that they starred in, Thursdays were talk show-based with a guest celebrity, and on Fridays they performed sketch comedy. It is said that this program became a basic framework for SMAP×SMAP which started a year after the program began. From April 1995, Kusanagi and Katori launched their radio program, SMAP Power Splash.

From July 1, 1995, Nakai launched his weekly radio program, Some Girl SMAP still airing as of 2016. On July 7, 1995, they released their seventh album, SMAP 007 Gold Singer, which became their first number-one studio album and was certified double platinum. They launched a tour, Summer Minna Atumare Party. After this tour, the band started to be called one of the hardest bands to get concert tickets for. In August 1995, they hosted the annual telethon, 24 Hour Television, and raised 1.2 billion yen. The band started performing at an annual music show, FNS Kayosai, and has become one of the main performers of the show since. From 2005, Kusanagi became the host of the show until he passed on the position to a comedian in 2014. In December 1995, they hosted a TV special, Sanma&SMAP, with comedian Sanma Akashiya and the program has become an annual event since for NTV, with 21 episodes aired.

=== 1996–1997: SMAP×SMAP, Lonvaca phenomenon, Mori's departure, and "Shake" ===
On March 3, 1996, they released their eighth album, SMAP 008 Tacomax, which peaked at No. 2, with over 500,000 copies sold. Singles "Munasawagi wo Tanomuyo" and "Hadaka no Osama" both peaked at No. 2 on the charts and was certified double Platinum. "Hadaka no Osama" became Mori's last single before his departure from the group. The band released another album, SMAP 009, on August 12, which reached number one. From March to April, they held their last tour as a six-piece.

On April 15, 1996, SMAP launched their self-titled variety show, SMAP×SMAP, commonly known as "SmaSma" (suma-suma), which was their first program on a prime-time slot. Along with the band's ability to entertain and their humorous personalities, the distinct format of the program received widespread critical praise. The show quickly gained high ratings, as it topped the rankings of annual household share ratings, dominating other existing popular programs. Consisting with an interview/cooking-based segment "Bistro SMAP", sketch comedy series, games, and musical performances by the group and with other musical guests, the program has had countless guests from around the world and is known for being the show with the widest range of guests in Japanese television history. The show ranked No. 1 in the annual household share ratings in 1996, 1997, 1999 – 2002, 2006, and 2016 making it the most watched television show in Japan. The episode aired in January 2002 is currently ranked No. 7 for the most watched Japanese variety show in history, with 34.2 million viewers. It is the eighth longest-running prime-time television program in Japan and Fuji Television's second longest-running prime-time television program, as of 2016.

From April to June 1996, Nakai, Kimura, and Katori each landed a role on a drama television series. Nakai played the main role in Shori no Megami, Kimura in Long Vacation, and Katori in Tomei Ningen. All three series were successful and gained high ratings. Among the three, Kimura's Long Vacation, which aired Monday nights, became a major success and a social phenomenon. Magazines and other media stated that, "women disappear from the city on Mondays", pointing out the large viewership and how intoxicating the show was for women in Japan. After Kimura playing a young pianist, there was a rapid increase of young men who started taking piano lessons. The cultural impact and influences of the show is commonly referred to as the "Lonvaca (ron-bake) phenomenon". This was also a breakthrough for Kimura as an actor and helped him gain recognition and a more broad fan base.

In May 1996, Mori's departure from the band was announced. Mori had always wanted to pursue Auto Race, a Japanese version of motorcycle speedway, since he was a child. Due to the fact that there was an age limit of twenty-three for students who wanted to attend school for Auto Race, Mori left the band aged 22. On May 27, a special episode on SMAP×SMAP, dedicated to Mori, was created and aired SMAP's last performance as a six-piece. Nakai said that he had an emotional breakdown after Mori's leave, not wanting to continue as a five-piece, fearing that their popularity will plummet and that he wished for a breakup.

On July 13 and 14, 1996, they hosted the annual twenty-seven-hour long television special, FNS 27 Hour Television. On July 15, 1996, the band released their single, "Aoi Inazuma", the first material released after Mori's departure, which reached number one on the charts. Their subsequent single, "Shake" was released in November, also reaching number one. These two songs were both certified triple platinum and became the band's fifth and fourth best selling single, respectively. "Shake" has surpassed one million copies in terms of shipments. From July to August, they held their second stadium tour, Chomugendaisho, which was the first tour after Mori's departure.

On January 3, 1997, SMAP starred in a TV movie, Boku ga Boku de Aru Tame ni. In February 1997, they released their single, "Dynamite", which peaked at No. 3 in the charts and became the band's eighth best selling single. In May 1997, they released their twenty-fifth single, "Celery", which was a cover of a song first released by singer-songwriter Masayoshi Yamazaki in 1996. Although Yamazaki's original version did not turn out to be a success, the cover version by SMAP peaked at No. 2 and was certified double Platinum. The band became a catalyst for the recognition of the song, turning it into one of the most popular songs in Japan. On March 26, 1997, the band released its second compilation album, Wool, which peaked at No. 2.

From April to June 1997, Kusanagi landed a role in a drama television series, Ii Hito. The band's single "Celery" became the theme song for the show. Nakai and Kimura made a cameo appearance on the show. Nakai, Kimura, Inagaki, and Katori had played a main role in a television series and with Kusanagi starring in Ii Hito, all five members had become leading man-class actors.

From July to September 1997, the band headlined their third stadium tour, SMAP 1997 Su, which was released through VHS and DVD on December 17, 1997. On August 6, 1997, the band released their tenth album, SMAP 011 Su, which peaked at No. 3 in the charts and was certified Platinum. From this point on, SMAP changed the pace of their releases from two albums per year to one, due to their busy schedules after experiencing individual success, as actors and television personalities. In September 1997, they released a new single, "Peace", which peaked at No. 2. On December 31, 1997, they performed at the annual music show, Kohaku Uta Gassen, for the seventh consecutive year. While they appeared as the performer for the previous six years, Nakai became the host of the show, which is the most prestigious job for television personalities. Nakai also hosted the program in 1998 and established himself as a highly regarded host on television.

=== 1998–2000: "Beyond the Night Sky", "Lion Heart", and Shingo Mama phenomenon ===
On January 14, 1998, the band's twenty-seventh single, "Beyond the Night Sky", was released. It reached number one on the charts and became the best selling single of that month and the second best selling single of that year. The song became the band's second best selling single, with over 1,620,000 physical copies sold. From April 2002, it has appeared in text books used in music classes in middle school and has become one of the most recognized songs in Japan. Many artists have released a cover since its release. Its subsequent single, "Taisetsu", which was used as the theme song for Nakai's drama television series, Brothers, peaked at No. 4 and was certified platinum. On June 18, 1998, the band released their eleventh album, SMAP 012 Viva Amigos, which reached number one in the charts and became their tenth best selling album. The band headlined their fourth stadium tour, Viva Amigos. The tour was released through VHS on December 24, 1998, and later through DVD on December 6, 2000.

From October 1998, Nakai and Katori launched their own variety program, SataSma, which was created and aimed towards younger viewers and families. Katori starred in a segment titled, "Shingo Mama's Secret Breakfast", where Katori would cross-dress into a character called, "Shingo Mama", and visit houses to cook breakfast for children instead of their mother, allowing her to sleep in and rest in the morning. Katori started to use the phrase, "Ohha", a pun for "Ohayo", meaning "good morning" during the segment as his trademark phrase, which soon became a popular word used among children. Shingo Mama, the lovable character Katori played, and the phrase "Ohha", became a social phenomenon. As a result, SMAP incidentally brought in kindergartners and preteens to their fan base.

In January 1999, the band released "Asahi wo Mini Ikouyo", which peaked at number 3 and its subsequent single, "Fly", peaked at number 2 in the charts. On January 3, 1999, SMAP starred in a special episode on the popular Japanese detective-drama television series Furuhata Ninzaburo, as themselves. The episode became the most watched program among all television series broadcast in 1999, with 32.3 million viewers, and the second most watched television program after an episode of SMAP×SMAP. On July 14, 1999, they released their twelfth album, Birdman SMAP 013, which peaked at No. 2. From July to September, they headlined their fifth stadium tour, SMAP 1999 Tour Birdman. The tour was released through VHS on December 22, 1999, and through DVD on January 1, 2000.

In August 2000, the band released their thirty-second single, "Lion Heart", which became a massive success with over 1,560,000 copies sold, reaching number one on the charts for two consecutive weeks. The song was used as the theme song for Kusanagi's drama television series, Food Fight, and became the band's third best selling single. It quickly became one of the most recognized songs in Japan. In August 2000, Katori also released a single, "Shingo Mama's Oha Rock", as Shingo Mama, which reached number one on the charts with over 1,300,000 physical copies sold and became a social phenomenon. James Brown guest-starred in the music video, along with other Japanese celebrities who made cameo appearances. In December 2000, the term "Ohha", used by Katori, won the Ryukougo Taisho, an annual traditional event of announcing words that describes that year.

On October 14, 2000, the band released their thirteenth album, S map SMAP 014. From this point on, SMAP changed the pace of their releases from one album per year to one album every two years, due to their busy individual schedules, as actors and television personalities. They headlined their sixth stadium tour, S map Tour, from October to November. The tour was released through DVD on March 14, 2001. The number of shows performed changed to one per day from this tour on. Kimura announced his marriage to singer Shizuka Kudo and her pregnancy during the tour. He had a press conference after the show at Saitama Super Arena.

=== 2001–2003: SMAP Vest, pamS, Drink SMAP, "The One and Only Flower in the World", and MIJ ===
On March 23, 2001, the band released their third compilation album, Smap Vest, which reached number one in the charts. It sold one million copies during the first week of release and 1,800,000 copies in total, becoming the band's best selling album. Singles, "Smac" and "freebird", peaked at No. 3 and No. 1 on the charts respectively. "Smac" was released as the 10th anniversary single and lyrics from the band's past singles were put together and made into a new song. On August 8, 2001, another compilation album, pamS (read as "Ura-suma"), was released just four months after Smap Vest. It was a compilation of fan-favorites and songs that the members personally like, that aren't usually sung on tour or on television, such as B-sides and songs from past albums. From July to September, the band launched their seventh stadium tour, pamS Tour, which was also their first five-dome tour and the first five-dome tour ever headlined in history. SMAP invented the concept of a "five-dome tour", a tour that hits the five dome-shaped stadiums located in Japan (Tokyo, Osaka, Nagoya, Fukuoka, and Sapporo). Since the invention of this new touring style, the five-dome tour is now used by many artists in Japan, as a symbol of being a first-rank artist in the music industry. The pamS Tour was released through DVD on December 21, 2001.

Throughout the year 2001, all five members starred in their own drama television series individually. Nakai starred in Shiroi Kage, Kimura in a detective series, Hero, Inagaki in Onmyoji, and Kusanagi in Star no Koi. Katori starred in a special episode of a comedy-drama television series, Ohha wa Sekai wo Sukuu. All programs were that year's high-rated programs. Among all shows, Hero became a massive success, becoming the most highest rated television series in Japanese history, becoming the only television series to have all episodes marking above the 30% sharehold rate.

On July 24, 2002, they released their fourteenth album, SMAP 015/Drink! Smap!, which peaked at No. 2 in the charts and became the band's fourth best selling album. The title was derived from a superseded soft drink, called SMAP, which was sold in Japan in the 1980s. From July 23, 2002, a canned soft drink, Drink SMAP, was launched from Kirin Beverage Corporation. Six million drinks were shipped on the day of its release. From July to November, they launched their eighth stadium tour, SMAP 02 Drink Smap Tour, which became the largest tour in terms of attendance in Japanese history, with a total attendance of 1.2 million. They decided mainly to use soccer stadiums for their venues, as it was the year the 2002 FIFA World Cup was held. The tour was released through DVD on March 5, 2003. On September 21, 2002, they released their first video album, Clip! Smap!, a collection of ten music videos released since 1996.

On March 5, 2003, the band's thirty-fifth single, "The One and Only Flower in the World", was released. It reached number one in the charts for three consecutive weeks twice and for seven non-consecutive weeks. It became the best selling single in the 21st century and the fifth best selling single in Japanese history. The song appears in text books used in school as children are taught to learn the song at a young age and has become one of the most recognized songs in Japan. It is the band's best selling single, with over 2,700,000 physical copies sold and their first record to sell over two million copies. In 2012, JASRAC, announced the winner of the JASRAC Award, in celebration of the award created in 1982. "The One and Only Flower in the World" received the award, as the copyrighted work in music with the highest paid royalties within the past thirty years. After thirteen years from its release, the single has continued to chart in the Top 200, for a total of two-hundred non-consecutive weeks and is currently ranked second with the highest total weeks in the charts, after "Nada Soso" (232 non-consecutive weeks). The song has been covered and re-arranged by heavy metal guitarist Marty Friedman on his 2006 album Loudspeaker.

On June 25, 2003, they released their fifteenth album, SMAP 016/MIJ, which peaked at number one and became the band's eighth best selling album. From July to September 2003, the band launched their ninth stadium tour, MIJ Tour. SMAP became the third artist in history to hold a concert at the International Stadium Yokohama, after B'z and Eikichi Yazawa. Due to scheduling conflicts with Katori's NHK Taiga drama, Shinsengumi, the number of shows were reduced compared to previous years, though the number of attendees surpassed one million two years in a row. The tour was released through DVD on December 24, 2003.

On December 31, 2003, SMAP appeared on the annual music show on NHK, Kohaku Uta Gassen, and performed "The One and Only Flower in the World". Out of the fifty-eight artists on the program, SMAP performed last for the first time, serving as the ootori, the most honorable and prestigious title in the Japanese music industry. SMAP became the first pop artist and the first group in history to perform as the ootori since the program started in 1951, as Kohaku is a historical and traditional music program and enka artists dominated the position of the ootori. As artists are ranked according to the ratings during their performance, SMAP ranked number one out of fifty-eight artists and was the most watched act of that year's Kohaku, with a household share rating of 57.1%.

=== 2004–2005: Individual activities and SAMPLE Bang ===
Although all five members were able to work actively as a group while pursuing solo careers since their debut, in 2004, their solo projects were on a tight schedule compared to the previous years, as they all carried their own television programs and worked as actors, on both television and film. They were not able to rearrange their schedules to fit in a time to work as a group, besides the taping of their weekly television program, SMAP×SMAP. It was announced that the band did not have a single day that all five members could meet together, other than the taping of SMAP×SMAP, which happened four times a month, commenting on the impossibility of shooting a music video, promoting a record, or going on tour. This led to a musical hiatus in a way, although they continued to perform their songs every week in a musical segment on SMAP×SMAP. This was the first time in thirteen years that the band did not release any new material or go on tour. A song titled "Wonderful Life" was initially scheduled to become the band's new single in 2004. After finding out that the release was unlikely, they first decided to wait until the coming year but later had Inagaki release the song as a solo artist instead. He created a temporary stage name, &G, and made his solo debut in March and the single reached number one in the charts.

From August 2004, Nakai launched his career as a sportscaster and became the host of the Olympic games on TBS. "Susume Gold", a remix of their song form their fifteenth album, SMAP 016/MIJ, was scheduled to be released on September 8, 2004, as the band's thirty-sixth single but was later canceled. The song served as the official song of the 2004 Summer Olympics and used during its television coverage on TBS. In December 2004, SMAP aired a television special as an apology for their musical hiatus and to show the fans their appreciation for their support on the group's solo projects. By the end of 2004, their single, "The One and Only Flower in the World", released in 2003, had become the best selling single in the 21st century and the most recognized song in Japan. Although many assumed that the band would be performing the song again at Kohaku Uta Gassen as the ootori, as they did the previous year, the band declined their invitation from the show due to not releasing any new music in 2004. Kohaku experienced a fall in ratings that year and became the lowest-rated Kohaku in history and the absence of SMAP is thought to be the cause of this.

In January 2005, the band released their new single, "Tomodachi e Say What You Will", a cover of Eric Clapton's "Say What You Will", which reached number one in the charts. Its subsequent singles, "Bang Bang Vacation" and "Triangle", and their sixteenth album, Sample Bang!, released on July 27, 2005, all reached number one in the charts as well. "Triangle" served as the official song of all sports broadcasts on TV Asahi, such as the 2006 Winter Olympics, the 2006 World Baseball Classic, and the ISU Grand Prix of Figure Skating. It was featured during the television coverage on TV Asahi from November 2005 through March 2006. Later in 2008, it was announced that "Triangle" would be appearing on text books used in music classes in school. From July to September 2005, they launched their tenth stadium tour, SMAP to Iku SMAP Sample Tour. SMAP became the first artist in history to perform at the National Olympic Stadium. The tour was released through DVD on December 14, 2005. In August 2005, Soichi Noguchi, a Japanese astronaut, played SMAP's hit single, "The One and Only Flower in the World", while flying in the Space Shuttle Discovery and it became the second Japanese song played in space. Noguchi also took with him, food that Inagaki, Kusanagi, and Katori cooked in Bistro SMAP, a cooking segment aired on SMAP×SMAP, when he made a guest appearance on the show. On August 27 and 28, Kusanagi and Katori hosted NTV's annual telethon, 24 Hour Television, and raised one billion yen. It also became the highest-rated 24 Hour Television since its launch in 1978. On December 31, SMAP performed "Triangle" at Kohaku Uta Gassen. As artists are ranked according to the ratings during their performance, SMAP ranked number one out of fifty-four artists, and was the most watched act of that year's Kohaku, with a household share rating of 48.6%.

=== 2006–2010: Pop Up! Smap, super.modern.artistic.performance, and We are SMAP ===
In April 2006, the band released their single, "Dear Woman", and its subsequent single, "Arigato" in October, both which reached number one in the charts. "Dear Woman" became one of the most recognized songs in Japan after being used in a shampoo commercial in Japan. Katori designed the cover art for "Arigato". "Arigato" served as the official song of the 2016 Summer Olympics, ten years after its release, and was featured during its television coverage on TBS. On July 26, 2006, the band released their seventeenth album, Pop Up! SMAP, which reached number one and became their ninth best selling album. From July to October, they launched their eleventh stadium tour, Pop Up! SMAP Tobimasu Tobidasu Tobisma Tour, and recorded an attendance of over one million, three years in a row. The tour was released through DVD on December 6, 2006. On December 31, SMAP performed "Arigato" at Kohaku Uta Gassen as the ootori for the second time. As artists are ranked according to the ratings during their performance, SMAP ranked number one out of fifty-eight artists, and was the most watched act of that year's Kohaku, with a household share rating of 48.8%.

On January 18, 2007, "The One and Only Flower in the World" was chosen as one of Nihon no Uta Hyakusen, a collection of one-hundred songs, widely beloved in Japan and encouraged to be sung in future generations. On September 8, 2007, Kimura starred in Hero, a sequel to the 2001–2005 detective television series of the same name. The film was a commercial success and became the highest-grossing film that year, as well as becoming the second highest-grossing film among all films starred by a SMAP member, after Howl's Moving Castle (2004) starring Kimura. In December 2007, they released a new single, "Dangan Fighter", which reached number one in the charts. It served as the official song of all sports broadcasts on TV Asahi and was featured during its television coverage. On December 31, SMAP performed "Dear Woman" and "Dangan Fighter" at Kohaku Uta Gassen. As artists are ranked according to the ratings during their performance, SMAP ranked number one out of fifty-four artists, and was the most watched act of that year's Kohaku, with a household share rating of 43.9%. Their hit single from 2003, "The One and Only Flower in the World" was performed by all fifty-four artists together as the finale and marked 46.1%.

In March 2008, they released a double-A-side single, "Sonomama / White Message", which reached number one, giving them forty-two consecutive top ten singles. Its subsequent single, "Sono toki, Kitto Yume janai", also topped the chart at number one, giving the band ten consecutive number ones. It also served as the official song of the 2008 Summer Olympics and was featured during the television coverage on TBS. On September 24, 2008, they released their eighteenth album, super.modern.artistic.performance, which reached number one in the charts. Will.i.am from The Black Eyed Peas produced the opening track, "Theme of 019", and also wrote and produced Katori's solo on the album, "Here Is Your Hit". SMAP became the second artist in history to have a total album sales of ten million, after Chage and Aska. The band launched their twelfth stadium tour, super.modern.artistic.performance tour, from September to December. The tour was released through DVD on December 17, 2008, and later through Blu-ray on March 26, 2014. On December 31, SMAP performed "Sono toki, Kitto Yume janai" at Kohaku Uta Gassen.

On January 31, 2009, SMAP hosted a three-hour television special, SMAP Gambarimasu, and became an annual television program until 2013, with five episodes aired in total. In August 2009, they released a double-A-side single, "Sotto Kyutto / Super Star", which reached number one. "Sotto Kyutto" served as the theme song for Kusanagi's high-rated drama television series, Ninkyo Helper, aired in 2009. "Super Star" served as the official song of all sports broadcasts on TV Asahi and was featured during its television coverage. The song was first aired through a live broadcast of the 2009 World Aquatics Championships. On December 31, SMAP performed "Sotto Kyutto" and "The One and Only Flower in the World" at Kohaku Uta Gassen.

On April 26, 2010, it was announced that SMAP would be hosting an event for their fans in China on June 13, 2010, as a part of Expo 2010 Shanghai China, though it was later canceled to avoid complications at the venue. Private companies in Shanghai released proposals stating that SMAP will be holding a concert at Shanghai as a pre-event of the expo, although they were later denied by Johnny & Associates and Victor Entertainment, informing the fans that they were ticket frauds. The band was scheduled to have their concert on October 9 and 10, at the Shanghai Stadium but was canceled due to the deteriorating Sino-Japanese relations. After many discussions and negotiations, the concert was indefinitely put on hold for safety reasons.

On July 21, 2010, they released their nineteenth album, We are SMAP!, which reached number one, giving the band five consecutive number one albums. The band launched their thirteenth stadium tour, We are SMAP, from July to September. It was announced that the total number of concert attendees throughout their career surpassed ten million. During a show on September 16, SMAP announced that former band member, Mori, was in the audience. The tour was released through DVD on December 8, 2010, and later through Blu-ray on March 26, 2014, and reached number one on the charts. From July 6, 2010, a bottled sports drink, called We Are SMAP was sold in Japan. In August 2010, they released their new single, "This is love", written for them by Love Psychedelico, which reached number one. On December 19, 2010, they hosted their annual television special, Sanma&SMAP, with comedian Sanma Akashiya, which became the highest-rated program aired that year, with a household share of 23.4%. On December 31, SMAP performed "This is love" and "Triangle" at Kohaku Uta Gassen as the ootori for the third time and for the first time in four years. As artists are ranked according to the ratings during their performance, SMAP ranked number one out of forty-four artists, and was the most watched act of that year's Kohaku, with a household share rating of 48.9%

=== 2011–2015: Smap Aid, Gift of Smap, and Mr.S ===
From March 2011, SMAP has shown active philanthropic support to the victims and regions affected by the 2011 Tohoku earthquake and tsunami. On May 4, their first and only digital single, "Not Alone" was released. It was initially scheduled to serve as the band's 46th single but was canceled and released digitally in light of the earthquake and the situation in Japan, considering circumstances in power shortages and distribution. One hundred yen per single downloaded was donated to the victims. On July 23 and 24, 2011, Nakai hosted the annual twenty-seven-hour long television special, FNS 27 Hour Television, for the fifth time. A special episode of "Bistro SMAP" was aired during the show, titled "Bistro SMAP On The Go". Four members flew to regions that were affected by the tsunami, Kimura and Inagaki to Iwate Prefecture and Kusanagi and Katori to Fukushima. The four members cooked a total of one-thousand meals to the victims evacuated in these areas. Nakai started to host his own music show, Ongaku no Hi, meaning "music day", to show their support to all those affected by the earthquake and tsunami. The program is aired every summer since 2011.

On August 17, 2011, the band released their fifth compilation album, SMAP Aid, to support the people affect by the 2011 Tohoku earthquake and tsunami. It was released for a limited- time period, until the end of December 2011. Two-hundred yen per album sold were donated to the victims. Fans were given the opportunity to create the track list by voting their favorite songs through the internet. The top fifteen songs made it into the album and the complete track list was announced on SMAP×SMAP on August 8, 2011. The album reached number one and was certified platinum. Although they released an album, concerts were not held in consequence of the earthquake and tsunami but the band decided to host fan meetings in various venues, including the Seibuen Theme Park in Saitama, where they had their first fan meeting on the day of the debut in 1991. On September 16, 2011, their postponed concert in China was held in Peking. The concert was released through DVD on December 7, 2011, and reached number one on the charts. After several fan meetings at small venues, on November 12 and 13, they hosted another event, titled FanxFun Party, at Tokyo Dome, for those who couldn't make it to the previous ones held that year. In December 2011, they released their new single, "Boku no Hanbun", which reached number one. Throughout the year, a Chinese version of their hit singles, "The One and Only Flower in the World" and "Beyond the Night Sky" was released in China. On December 31, they performed "Not Alone" and "Original Smile" at Kohaku Uta Gassen, as the ootori, for the fourth time.

In April 2012, they released their new single, "Sakasama no Sora", which reached number one in the charts. The song was used as the theme song for NHK's television drama series, Umechan Sensei, and SMAP became the first artist under Johnny & Associates to contribute a song to an asadora. On August 1, 2012, they released their new single, "Moment", and their twentieth album, Gift of SMAP, on August 8, both which reached number one in the charts. "Moment" served as the official song of the 2012 Summer Olympics and was featured during the television coverage on TBS. They launched their fourteenth stadium tour, Gift of SMAP Concert Tour, from August to December. The number of attendees for one tour surpassed one million, for the first time six years. The tour was released through DVD on December 5, 2012, and later through Blu-ray on March 26, 2014, and reached number one in the charts. On December 31, 2012, they performed "Moment" and "Sakasama no Sora" on Kohaku Uta Gassen, as the ootori, for the fifth time. They became the first artist in history to serve as the ootori three years in a row. As artists are ranked according to the ratings during their performance, SMAP ranked number one out of forty-four artists, and was the most watched act of that year's Kohaku, with a household share rating of 49.4%.

In February 2013, they released a double-A-side single, "Mistake! / Battery", which reached number one. Subsequent singles, "Joy", which was used as the theme song for Katori's drama television series, Kasukana Kanojyo, and "Shareotsu / Hello", also reached number one. From March 2013, SMAP launched a collaborative project with Universal Studios Japan titled, "Universal Studios Japan x SMAP: World Entertainment Project" and their song, "Battery" was used as background music for the attractions at the theme park. On March 15, the day the attraction was launched, it created the longest queue and waiting time in USJ's history. On April 8, 2013, they aired a two-hour long special episode of SMAP×SMAP, titled "SMAP's First 5-Member Trip", celebrating their 25th anniversary. The program became the third most watched television program that year, with a 20% household share rating and became the twelfth most watched episode of SMAP×SMAP. On September 9, a live episode of SMAP×SMAP titled "SMAP Nonstop Special" was aired. The band performed all the past fifty singles in order of their releases in a medley, live for forty-minutes, without any commercials. On September 30, SMAP hosted a TV special, SMAP Go! Go!, and aired a short sequel to Furuhata vs SMAP, a special episode of the famous detective-drama television series, Furuhata Ninzaburo, aired in 1999. The drama was shot in one take during the broadcast of the TV special and aired live as they shot it. On December 31, they performed "Mistake" and "Joy" at Kohaku Uta Gassen as the ootori, for the sixth time, four years in a row.

On March 26, 2014, SMAP was invited to the NPB Tigers-Giants Union vs MLB All Star, held in celebration of the eightieth anniversary of the Japan Professional Baseball and sang the national anthem. In April 2014, they released a double-A-side single, "Yes we are / Kokokara", which reached number one. Their subsequent double-A-side single, "Top Of The World / Amazing Discovery", which served as the official song for Universal Studios Japan, also reached number one. On April 18, SMAP became the first ambassador of Universal Studios Japan and attended the ceremony with Prime Minister Abe and Caroline Kennedy. It was announced that "Yes we are" will be used as the theme song for N Suta on TBS, a news program aired on weekdays, and that "Kokokara" will be used as the theme song for the Nihonbashi's revitalizing project. On July 26 and 27, 2014, SMAP hosted the annual twenty-seven-hour long television program, FNS 27 Hour Television. Though Nakai had hosted the show several times on his own, it became the band's first time to host as a group. A letter from former band member Katsuyuki Mori, who departed the group in 1996, was read during the show. On September 3, 2014, they released their twenty-first album, Mr.S, which reached number one, and the band launched their fifteenth stadium tour, Mr.S Saikou de Saikou no Concert Tour, from September to January 2015. The tour was released through DVD and Blu-ray on December 10, 2014, and reached number one in the charts. On December 31, they performed "Shake", "The One and Only Flower in the World", and "Top of the World" at Kohaku Uta Gassen.

On January 25, 2015, Inagaki and Kusanagi hosted a TV special, Ichii jya nakutte Iijanai, together for the first time. In February, SMAP released a double A-side single, "Kareinaru Gyakushu / Humor Shichauyo", which reached number one, bringing the total number of records sold to 35 million. From April 29 to June 2, Kusanagi and Katori starred in a two-act play, Burst!, written by playwright Kōki Mitani, at the Parco Theatre. Their fifty-fifth single, "Otherside / Ai ga Tomarumadewa", was released on September 9, which was the same day the band's debut single was released in 1991. The single gave them their twenty-second consecutive number one singles. On December 31, they performed "Triangle" and "Otherside" on Kohaku Uta Gassen. Throughout the year, SMAP became the representative for promoting and supporting NHK Nodojiman, in celebration of the program's seventieth anniversary. On November 10, it was announced that SMAP will be the representative and supporter for the Paralympic games until the 2020 Summer Olympics and Paralympics, in partnership with the Nippon Foundation. Katori painted the forty-square feet mural in the building of the Nippon Foundation, which took about ten days to complete.

=== 2016: Disbandment ===
On January 13, 2016, media reported that Nakai, Inagaki, Kusanagi, and Katori were in talks to leave Johnny & Associates agency, inevitably leading to a disbandment of SMAP. On January 18, such a breakup was denied later by the group through a live broadcast of their weekly variety program, SMAP×SMAP, issuing an apology for worrying the fans and creating chaos in the Japanese entertainment industry. On August 14, at 12:50 am, Johnny & Associates announced through a press release that SMAP will disband on December 31, 2016.

From August to December, radio stations that carry programs hosted by the members of SMAP announced at their press conferences that the three programs, Some Girl SMAP hosted by Nakai, Stop the SMAP hosted by Inagaki, and SMAP Power Splash hosted by Kusanagi and Katori, will continue to air after the disbandment, though the name "SMAP" will be removed from the titles. In December, Kimura announced that his radio program, What's Up SMAP, will continue as well, though he decided not to change the title, unlike the rest of the members. On December 30, the band's weekday radio program, Ohayo SMAP, which debuted in 1994 ended its twenty-two-year-long broadcast.

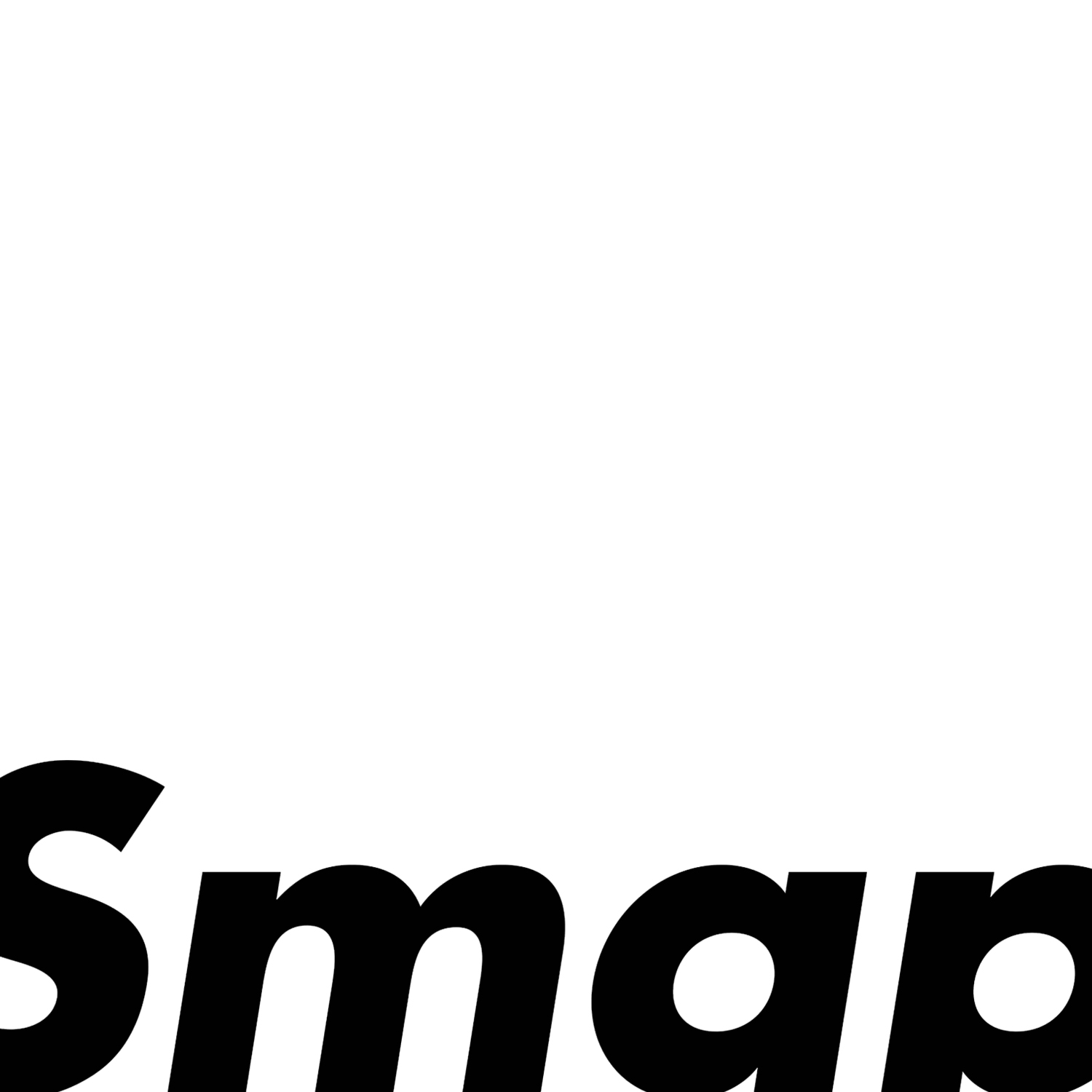
Cover of SMAP 25 Years

On September 21, 2016, Victor Entertainment announced that a compilation album and a video album will be released, commemorating the band's twenty-fifth anniversary. Fans were given the opportunity to choose the track list for the compilation album, by voting their favorites through the internet out of the 400 songs SMAP had released during their quarter-century-long career. On November 3, the full track list was revealed on Victor Entertainment's website and announced on national news in Japan. On December 21, SMAP released their sixth compilation album, SMAP 25 YEARS. The album sold 668,000 physical copies during the first week of release and debuted at number one, giving the band its fifteenth number one album and becoming the fastest selling album of 2016. It was certified triple Platinum on December 27 in its first week and was certified Diamond on January 10 during its third week, denoting physical sales of one million copies. The album stayed at number one for two consecutive weeks.

On December 26, 2016, the final episode of their weekly variety program, SMAPxSMAP, was aired. The five-hour-long episode was aired in a clip show format, primarily consisting of excerpts from past episodes that aired during the past twenty years since its debut on April 15, 1996. SMAP's last singing performance as a group, which was taped on December 1, 2016, was aired at the end of the program. They sang their mega-hit song, "The One and Only Flower in the World" (世界に一つだけの花). At the ending credits, a heartwarming video of SMAP taking photos with the program's staff was shown.

On December 28, 2016, SMAP released their second video album, Clip! Smap! Complete Singles, through DVD and Blu-ray, featuring all sixty-three music videos the band made during their twenty-five-year-long career. The DVD sold 192,000 copies and the Blu-ray sold 189,000 copies during its first week of release and debuted at number one simultaneously, giving the band their ninth number one DVD. Both stayed at number one for two consecutive weeks, becoming the first DVD and Blu-ray to reach number one for two weeks, since the official Blu-ray charts started in Japan in 2008. It was certified Platinum during its second week. After they disbanded, they sent the farewell messages to their fans.

In 2023, Nakai got in "trouble" with a woman and tried to pay her off, an arrangement in which Fuji Television executives were complicit.

== Members ==
- Masahiro Nakai
- Takuya Kimura
- Goro Inagaki
- Tsuyoshi Kusanagi
- Shingo Katori
- Katsuyuki Mori

== Other ventures ==
=== Philanthropy ===
SMAP was heavily involved in philanthropic activities. They have actively offered philanthropic support especially to the victims and regions affected by the 2011 Tohoku earthquake and tsunami and the 2016 Kumamoto earthquakes. On August 26 and 27, 1995, SMAP hosted NTV's annual telethon, 24 Hour Television, and raised 1.1 billion yen. On August 27 and 28, 2005, Kusanagi and Katori hosted the 24 Hour Television, again, and raised one billion yen.

In 2011, after the Tohoku earthquake and tsunami, they bought a 30-second television commercial block in their weekly television program, SMAP×SMAP, to air a commercial on the information about the Japanese Red Cross Society and a message from the band members encouraging people to donate. Rather than reusing the ones aired in the past, they have been reshooting the commercial every time they have a taping and have them aired every week at the end of the program. Since March 2011, they have actively worked as the members of Marching J, a charity organization established by their agency, Johnny & Associates. Each band member have also made individual donations.

On May 4, 2011, their first and only digital single, "Not Alone" was released. Initially scheduled to serve as the band's 46th single, it was later canceled and released digitally in light of the earthquake and the situation in Japan, considering circumstances in power shortages and distribution. One hundred yen per single downloaded was donated to the victims. On July 23 and 24, 2011, Nakai hosted the annual twenty-seven-hour long television special, FNS 27 Hour Television, for the fifth time. A special episode of "Bistro SMAP", a cooking segment on SMAP×SMAP, was aired during the show, titled "Bistro SMAP On The Go". Four members flew to regions that were affected by the earthquake and tsunami, Kimura and Inagaki to Iwate Prefecture and Kusanagi and Katori to Fukushima. The four members cooked a total of one-thousand meals to the victims evacuated in these areas. Nakai started to host his own music show, Ongaku no Hi, meaning "music day", to show their support to all those affected by the earthquake and tsunami. The program is aired every summer since 2011. On August 17, 2011, the band released their fifth compilation album, SMAP Aid, to support the people affect by the earthquake and tsunami. Two-hundred yen per album sold were donated to the victims. Being that it was the band's twentieth anniversary, many predicted a tour after the release of the album but the band canceled it due to power shortage in Japan that year.

After the 2016 Kumamoto earthquakes, the content of their 30-second long commercial changed, adding a new message by the band members toward the victims in Kumamoto. On April 24, ten days after the earthquake, Nakai made an unannounced surprise visit to an elementary school in Kumamoto, used as a shelter for the evacuees. He, later went back to Kumamoto on 2 more occasions: May 7 and again on May 15 with Katori. On June 12, Kimura made a visit to Kumamoto as well.

=== Endorsements and partnerships ===
SMAP is one of the highest paid celebrities for endorsements and commercial appearances in Japan, with an estimated contract of one hundred million yen per commercial. Since 1991, they have had over fifty contracts with Japan's largest firms, both as a group and individually. Among the firms and products they have endorsed in the past, the most recognized are NTT, SoftBank, Dole, Meiji, Ajinomoto, and Suntory Boss Coffee. From 1991 to 1992, they contributed "Seigi no Mikata wa Ate ni Naranai" and "Kokoro no Kagami" to Panasonic's television commercial. From 1992 to 1993, their songs "Egao no Genki", "Hajimete no Natsu", and "Kimi wa Kimi dayo" were used as the theme song for anime series, Hime-chan's Ribbon. From 1994 to 1995, "Original Smile" and "Shiyouyo were used in Kimura's television commercial for Oronamin C Drink. In 1996, "Munasawagi wo Tanomuyo" was used in Kimura's commercial for Kanebo Cosmetics. In 1999, "Fly" was used in the television commercials for NTT. From 2005 to 2006, "Triangle" served as the official song for all sports broadcasts on TV Asahi.

Since 2004, they have contributed their material to serve as the official song for the Olympics. Their song "Susume" was used for the 2004 Summer Olympics, "Kono Toki, Kitto Yume Jyanai" for the 2008 Summer Olympics, "Moment" for the 2012 Summer Olympics, and "Arigato" for the 2016 Summer Olympics, and were featured during the television coverage on TBS. In 2006, "Triangle" served as the official song for the 2006 Winter Olympics. In 2006, the band contributed their song "Dear Woman" to Shiseido's shampoo commercial and led it to become number one in the Top 10 Best Commercials of 2006. In 2007, their debut single, "Can't Stop Loving" was used in Otsuka Pharmaceutical's television commercial for Pocari Sweat, after sixteen years since its release. In 2008, "Dangan Fighter" served as the official song for all sports broadcasts on TV Asahi. From 2009, they signed a deal with SoftBank. On August 1, the first commercial aired on 124 commercial broadcast television networks and five digital billboards located in Japan at the same time at 6:59 pm. On December 29, 2011, a 330-second long commercial aired, setting a record for the longest television commercial aired in Japan. In 2009, "Super Star" served as the official song for all sports broadcasts on TV Asahi. In 2012, they contributed "Sakasama no Sora" to NHK's television series, Umechan Sensei.

From 2012, SMAP signed a partnership deal with 7-Eleven. While appearing in 7-Eleven's television commercials, the product development department collaborated with Bistro SMAP, a cooking segment in the band's weekly television program, SMAP×SMAP, where the band members cook food for celebrity guests. After airing Bistro SMAP for over fifteen years, the project was launched in response to requests from viewers and fans who wanted to try the food cooked by SMAP. Each member created their own food, such as sandwiches, snacks, noodle soups, and bentos, to sell at the 7-Eleven stores in Japan. The bentos were collectively called "Bistro Bentos". The first set of menus were sold in 2012 and a new set was sold every year until 2015. In 2013, they signed a deal with Suntory's Boss Coffee, starring in television commercials with Tommy Lee Jones. In 2013, they collaborated with Sanrio and contributed their song "Hello" in celebration of Hello Kitty's 40th anniversary. In 2014, they became the ambassador for Universal Studios Japan and contributed their song "Battery" to play as the background music for the attractions at the theme park. "Amazing Discovery" served as the official song for Universal Studios Japan. The same year, their song "Kokokara" was used as the theme song for Nihonbashi's Revitalization Project. In December 2014, they contributed "Humor Shichauyo" to be the official song for Shidax's Heart&Smile Project launched to help children in Africa and fifty yen per single sold was donated. From 2015, "Ai ga Tomarumade wa" was used in Katori's television commercial for JA Group.

In November 2015, SMAP became the representative and the supporter for the Paralympic games until the 2020 Summer Olympics and Paralympics, in partnership with the Nippon Foundation. In the wake of SMAP's disbandment in December 2016, Atarashii Chizu, a group consisting of former SMAP members Shingo Katori, Goro Inagaki, and Tsuyoshi Kusanagi have taken over as representatives and ambassadors for the Paralympics. As of October 2017, Katori has participated in an art exhibition organised by the Nippon Foundation.

== Discography ==
Studio albums

- 1992: SMAP 001
- 1992: SMAP 002
- 1993: SMAP 003
- 1993: SMAP 004
- 1994: SMAP 005
- 1994: SMAP 006: Sexy Six
- 1995: SMAP 007: Gold Singer
- 1996: SMAP 008: Tacomax
- 1996: SMAP 009
- 1997: SMAP 011: Su
- 1998: SMAP 012: Viva Amigos!
- 1999: Birdman SMAP 013
- 2000: S map SMAP 014
- 2002: SMAP 015/Drink! Smap!
- 2003: SMAP 016/MIJ
- 2005: Sample Bang!
- 2006: Pop Up! SMAP
- 2008: Super Modern Artistic Performance
- 2010: We are SMAP!
- 2012: Gift of SMAP
- 2014: Mr.S

Compilation albums

- 1995: Cool
- 1997: Wool
- 2001: Smap Vest
- 2001: pamS
- 2011: SMAP AID
- 2016: SMAP 25 Years

== Filmography ==
=== Television (as personality and performer) ===
Year	Title	Role	Notes
1988	Wa tto Atsumare	Themselves	
1989	Uta no Big Fight	Themselves (host)	
1989–1991	Idol Kyowakoku	Themselves (host)	
1990–1991	SMAP no Gakuen Kids	Themselves (host)	
1990–1999	Shinshun Kakushigei Taikai	Themselves (host, guest)	
1991–1996	I Love SMAP	Themselves (host)	
1991–2015	Music Station	Themselves (guest performer)	Guest appearance; 124 episodes
1991–2015	FNS Kayousai	Themselves (guest performer)	Guest appearance; 27 episodes
1991–2015	Kohaku Uta Gassen	Themselves (guest performer)	Guest appearance; 23 episodes
1992–1995	Yume ga Mori Mori	Themselves	
1993–1996	Kiss shita SMAP	Themselves (host)	
1993–1997	Idol On Stage	Themselves (host, performer)	
1993–2015	Music Station Super Live	Themselves (guest performer)	Guest appearance; 20 episodes
1994–1996	Magical Zunou Power	Themselves	
1994–2014	Waratte Iitomo	Themselves	
1995	SMAP no Gambarimashou	Themselves (host)	
1995	24 Hour Television	Themselves (host)	Telethon
1995	Tokyo Friend Park 2	Themselves (contestant)	Guest appearance
1995–1997	SMAP Toshikoshi	Themselves (host, performer)	TV special; 3 episodes
1995–2015	Sanma&SMAP	Themselves (host)	TV special; 21 episodes
1996	Super TV: SMAP 120 Days	Themselves	Documentary
1996	FAN SMAP Special	Themselves (performer)	TV special; 1 episode
1996	Bang! Bang! Bang!	Themselves	
1996–2014	27 Hour Television	Themselves (host)	TV special; 10 episodes
1996–2010	Utaban	Themselves (host, performer)	
1996–2016	SMAP×SMAP	Themselves (host, chef, performer)	
1998–2002	SataSma	Themselves (host)	
2000	SMAP Secret X'mas Party	Themselves (host)	TV special; 1 episode
2002	DeliSma	Themselves (host)	
2003	Smao	Themselves (host)	
2003	Tokyo Friend Park 2	Themselves (contestant)	Guest appearance
2003–2006	Best Artist	Themselves (guest performer)	TV special; 3 episodes
2005	24 Hour Television	Themselves (host)	Telethon
2007–2016	Baby Smap	Themselves (host)	
2009	Fuji TV 50th Anniversary	Themselves (host)	TV special; 1 episode
2009–2013	SMAP Gambarimasu	Themselves (host)	TV special; 5 episodes
2010–2015	CDTV Special	Themselves (host, performer)	TV special: 6 episodes
2011	Professional	Themselves	Documentary
2011–2015	Ongaku no Hi	Themselves (host, performer)	TV special; 5 episodes
2012–2015	FNS Uta no Natsumatsuri	Themselves (host, performer)	TV special; 4 episodes
2012–2015	Utage	Themselves (host, performer)	
2012–2015	Ashita e Concert	Themselves (host, performer)	TV special; 5 episodes
2013	SMAP Go! Go!	Themselves (host)	TV special; 1 episode
2014	TV Tokyo 50th Anniversary	Themselves (host)	TV special; 1 episode
2014–2015	SmaShip	Themselves (host)	TV special; 2 episodes
2015	Ichii Jyanakutte Iijyanai	Themselves (host)	TV special; 2 episodes
2015	Bokura no Ongaku Our Music	Themselves (host, performer)	TV special; 1 episode
2015–2016	NHK Nodojiman	Themselves (host)	

=== Television (as actors) ===
Year	Title	Role	Notes
1988–1989	Abunai Shonen III	Themselves	Main role
1992	Motto, Tokimeki wo	Themselves	Guest appearance; TV special
1997	Boku ga Boku de Arutame ni	Nakai-Hayato Narise; Kimura-Riki Kurosawa; Inagaki-Masami Kishita; Kusanagi-Etsuro Mizoguchi; Katori-Satoshi Ozu	Main role; TV special
1999	Furuhata Ninzaburo vs SMAP	Themselves	Main role; special episode of Furuhata Ninzaburo
2001	Yonimo Kimyo na Monogatari	Nakai-Yoji Sagara; Kimura-Naoki Yunomoto; Inagaki-Katsuya Tashiro; Kusanagi-Kenichiro Honda; Katori-Ichiro Tadano	Main role; TV special
2004	X'smap	Nakai-Jyunsa; Kimura-Ajii; Inagaki-Junior; Kusanagi-Master; Katori-Otto	Main role; TV special
2010	Dokutomato Satsujin Jiken	Themselves	Main role; TV special
2013	Furuhata vs SMAP The Aftermath	Themselves	Main role; TV special; sequel to Furuhata Ninzaburo vs SMAP
2014	Oretachi ni Asu wa aru	Themselves	Main role; TV special
2014	Sazae-san	Themselves (voice)	Episode 7148: "Recipe for a Smile"

=== Film ===
Year	Title	Role	Notes
1994	Shoot!	Nakai-Toshihiko Tanaka; Kimura-Yoshiharu Kubo; Inagaki-Keigo Umahori; Mori-Kenji Shiraishi; Kusanagi-Atsushi Kamitani; Katori-Kazuhiro Hiramatsu	Main role

=== Theatre ===
Year	Title	Role	Notes
1991	Saint Seiya	Nakai-Pegasus Seiya; Kimura-Kaio Poseidon / Julian Solo; Inagaki-Phoenix Kazuki; Mori-Kignas Hyoga; Kusanagi-Dragon Shiryu; Katori-Andoromeda Shun	Main role
1992	Dragon Quest		Main role
1993	Another		Main role

=== Radio ===
Year	Title	Member (s)	Role	Notes
1991–2016	Stop the SMAP	Inagaki	Himself	Airing after disbandment, though the title has changed to Henshucho Inagaki Goro from January 2017.
1995–2016	Some Girl SMAP	Nakai	Himself	Airing after disbandment, though the title has changed to Nakai Masahiro's On & On Air from January 2017.
1995–2018	What's Up SMAP	Kimura	Himself	
1995–2016	SMAP Power Splash	Kusanagi, Katori	Themselves	Airing after disbandment, though the title has changed to ShinTsuyo Power Splash from January 2017.
1996–2016	Ohayo SMAP	All	Themselves	

=== Commercials ===
Year	Company	Product	Featured song(s)	Notes
1989	Tombow	School uniform		
1989	Morinaga Milk Industry	Soft drink beverage		
1991–1992	Panasonic	Fax machine	"Seigi no Mikata wa Ate ni Naranai", "Kokoro no Kagami"	
1992	Panasonic	Word processor	"Kiss of Fire"; "100-man no Kotoba"	
1993	Panasonic	Phone		
1992	Lotte	Ice cream		
1992	Lotte	Cereal Chocolate		
1992	Lotte	Vacation Chocolate		
1993–1994	Lotte	Snack		
1994–1995	Lotte	Gum	"Kimi to Boku no Rokkagetsu"	
1995	Calbee	Potato chips	"Donna Iikoto"	Contributed a song but the band does not appear in the commercial
1995–1996	Ajinomoto	Knorr soup		
1995–1999	NTT		"Kansha Shite", "Shake", "Sorejya Mata"	
1999–2009	NTT East Corporation		"Fly"	
2006–2008	NTT	Flet's	"Sonomama", "Tabidachi no Hi ni"	
1995	Acecook	Ex noodle		
1996	Acecook	Super cup noodle		
1996	Acecook	Yakisoba		
1996–1997	NTV baseball		"Mienai Mono"	
2000	Enix / Square Enix	Dragon Quest VII		
2001–2003	ANA			
2004	Enix / Square Enix	Dragon Quest VIII		
2005	Tokio Marine Nichido	Car insurance		A 90-second commercial that aired once during a live broadcast of a soccer game
2005–2006	Mitsui Fudosan	Shibaura Island		Aired in the Kanto region only
2006–2007	Shiseido	Shampoo	"Dear Woman"	Contributed a song but the band does not appear in the commercial
2006–2007	Recruit	Hot Pepper Magazine		
2007–2008	Otsuka Pharmaceutical	Pocari Sweat	"Can't Stop -Loving-"	
2009–2015	SoftBank		"Love & Peace Inside"	
2009	Enix / Square Enix	Dragon Quest IX		
2009–2013	SoftBank	Cell phone		
2010	SoftBank	iPhone 3G		
2010	Lotte	Gum	"Glamorous"	
2011	AC Japan			
2011	Dole Food Company	Bananas		
2012	Enix / Square Enix	Dragon Quest X		
2012–2013	Seven & I Holdings	Sogo & Seibu retail		
2012–2013	Seven & I Holdings	Summer and winter gifts	"Gift"	
2012–2016	Seven & I Holdings	Seven Premium		
2013	SoftBank	UULA Music streaming service	"Tenohira no Sekai"	
2013–2014	Suntory	Boss canned coffee		
2013–2014	Sanrio	Hello Kitty	"Hello"	Contributed a song but the band does not appear in the commercial
2014	Mitsui Fudosan	Nihonbashi	"Kokokara"	Contributed a song but the band does not appear in the commercial
2014–2016	Universal Studios Japan	Wizarding World of Harry Potter	"Amazing Discovery"	
2016	SoftBank		"Original Smile"	A one-minute commercial that aired once during the last episode of SMAPxSMAP, created by Softbank out of respect and to thank SMAP for being in the commercial for six years.

== Concert tours ==
- Spring SMAP 91 (March–April 1991)
- SMAP 92 Yattekimashita Oshogatsu (January 1992)
- Spring SMAP 92 (March–April 1992)
- SMAP 92 Summer Concert (August 1992)
- SMAP Live (November 1992)
- New Year Concert (January 1993)
- Spring SMAP 93 (March–April 1993)
- New Year Concert (January 1994)
- Spring Concert (April–May 1994)
- Sexy Six Show (July–August 1994)
- Cool January (January 1995)
- Cool Spring (March–April 1995)
- Summer Minna Atumare Party (July–September 1995)
- Winter Concert (December 1995 – January 1996)
- Spring Concert (March–April 1996)
- Chomugendaisho (July–August 1996)
- SMAP Subarashii Sutekina Sugoizo (July–September 1997)
- Concert Tour 1998 Viva Amigos (July–September 1998)
- SMAP 1999 Tour Birdman (July–September 1999)
- SMAP 00 S map Tour (October–November 2000)
- SMAP 01 pamS Tour (July–September 2001)
- SMAP 02 Drink Smap Tour (July–November 2002)
- SMAP 03 MIJ Tour (July–September 2003)
- SMAP Sample Tour (July–September 2005)
- Pop Up SMAP Tour (July–October 2006)
- super.modern.artistic.performance tour (September–December 2008)
- We are SMAP Concert Tour (July–September 2010)
- Gift of SMAP Concert Tour (August–December 2012)
- Mr.S Saikou de Saikou no Concert Tour (September 2014 – January 2015)

== Awards and nominations ==
=== Golden Arrow Award ===
The Golden Arrow Award is presented by the Japan Magazine Publishers Association (JMPA) to recognize excellence in domestic media. SMAP has won two awards.

Year	Nominee / work	Award	Result
1991	SMAP	Best Newcomer	Won
1991	SMAP	Newcomer Award (Music)	Won

=== Japan Gold Disc Award ===
The Japan Gold Disc Awards are the Recording Industry Association of Japan's annual music awards. SMAP has won fifteen awards.

Year	Nominee / work	Award	Result
1992	SMAP	Best 5 New Artist Award	Won
1995	Cool	Album Award	Won
1995	Sexy Six Show	Music Video Award	Won
1996	SMAP 007: Gold Singer	Album Award	Won
1997	SMAP 008: Taxomax	Album Award	Won
1999	"Yozora no Mukō"	Song of the Year (Special Award)	Won
2001	"Lion Heart"	Song of the Year	Won
2002	SMAP Vest	Pop Album of the Year	Won
2004	"Sekai ni Hitotsu Dake no Hana"	Song of the Year	Won
2004	Smap! Tour! 2002!	Music Video of the Year	Won
2004	Live MIJ	Music Video of the Year	Won
2006	SMAP to Icchatta! SMAP Sample Tour2005	Music Video of the Year	Won
2007	Pop Up! SMAP Live	Best Music Videos	Won
2009	SMAP 2008 Super Modern Artistic Performance Tour	Best Music Videos	Won
2017	SMAP 25 Years	Album of the Year	Won

=== Japan Music Award ===
The Japan Music Awards are presented by the Broadcast Music Producers Federation for outstanding achievements in the record industry. SMAP has won one award.

Year	Nominee / work	Award	Result
1991	"Can't Stop!! Loving"	Rookie of the Year	Won

=== Japan Record Award ===
The Japan Record Awards are presented by the Japan Composer's Association for outstanding achievements in the record industry. SMAP declined their nominations, citing the lyrics of "Sekai ni Hitotsu Dake no Hana" which encourages listeners to seek individuality instead of being number one.

Year	Nominee / work	Award	Result
2003	"Sekai ni Hitotsu Dake no Hana"	Japan Record Award	Declined
2003	"Sekai ni Hitotsu Dake no Hana"	Gold Award	Declined

== Publications ==
- SMAP Super Photo Book The First (October 1992) ISBN 978-4056011500
- SMAP Photo Book Shonenki (June 1993) ISBN 978-4081021123
- SMAP Year Book 1993–1994 reminiscence (May 1994) ISBN 978-4847024283
- SMAP Year Book 1994–1995 revival & evolution (June 1996) ISBN 978-4847024290
- Snap (December 2001) ISBN 978-4893891716
- The SMAP Magazine Super fashion & Music Assemble Photo magazine (October 2010) ISBN 978-4-8387-8614-5
- SMAP×SMAP Complete Book Gekkan SmaSma Shinbun Vol.1 Pink (June 19, 2012) ISBN 978-4863362369
- SMAP×SMAP Complete Book Gekkan SmaSma Shinbun Vol.2 Red (June 19, 2012) ISBN 978-4863362369
- SMAP×SMAP Complete Book Gekkan SmaSma Shinbun Vol.3 Blue (July 24, 2012) ISBN 978-4863362376
- SMAP×SMAP Complete Book Gekkan SmaSma Shinbun Vol.4 Yellow (August 28, 2012) ISBN 978-4863362383
- SMAP×SMAP Complete Book Gekkan SmaSma Shinbun Vol.5 Green (September 18, 2012) ISBN 978-4863362390

== See also ==
- List of best-selling music artists in Japan
- Kōhaku Uta Gassen
