= List of Karaoke Revolution songs =

This is a list of songs in the Karaoke Revolution games, which are developed by Harmonix and Blitz Games and published by Konami.

== Song lists – North America ==
Note: These songlists include the names of the artists who most famously recorded the song. The songs as they appear in the game are covers, with the exceptions being the song "Dance Like There's No Tomorrow", which is the master recording of the Paula Abdul song, "Science Genius Girl", which is the master recording of the Freezepop song, and 10 original Mowtown songs in the Xbox version of Karaoke Revolution

=== Karaoke Revolution (NTSC) ===
Note: Italics denotes a "locked" song, requiring certain requirements to be met in order to be accessed.

1. "Addicted" – Simple Plan
2. "All You Wanted" – Michelle Branch
3. "Are You Happy Now?" – Michelle Branch
4. "Believe" – Cher
5. "Billie Jean" – Michael Jackson
6. "Bizarre Love Triangle" – New Order
7. "Broken Wings" – Mr. Mister
8. "Celebration" – Kool & the Gang
9. "Chain of Fools" – Aretha Franklin
10. "Complicated" – Avril Lavigne
11. "Crawling in the Dark" – Hoobastank
12. "Don't Know Why" – Norah Jones
13. "Every Morning" – Sugar Ray
14. "Everything You Want" – Vertical Horizon
15. "Girls Just Want To Have Fun" – Cyndi Lauper
16. "Hey Everybody" – Jennifer Love Hewitt*
17. "Hey Jealousy" – Gin Blossoms
18. "Hit Me With Your Best Shot" – Pat Benatar
19. "How You Remind Me" – Nickelback
20. "I'm Coming Out" – Diana Ross
21. "It's the End of the World as We Know It (and I Feel Fine)" – R.E.M.
22. "Kiss Me" – Sixpence None the Richer
23. "Ladies' Night" – Kool & the Gang
24. "Like a Virgin" – Madonna
25. "One Week" – Barenaked Ladies
26. "Red Red Wine" – UB40
27. "Save Tonight" – Eagle-Eye Cherry
28. "Science Genius Girl" – Freezepop
29. "She Talks to Angels" – Black Crowes
30. "Smooth Criminal" – Alien Ant Farm
31. "Son of a Preacher Man" – Dusty Springfield
32. "The Power of Love" (from Back To The Future) – Huey Lewis and the News
33. "Waiting for Tonight" – Jennifer Lopez
34. "When a Man Loves a Woman" – Percy Sledge
35. "Wind Beneath My Wings" – Bette Midler
36. "You Really Got Me" – Van Halen
37. "You're the One That I Want" – John Travolta and Olivia Newton-John

* Removed from final game

=== Karaoke Revolution Volume 2 – PS2 Only (NTSC) ===
Note: Italics denotes a "locked" song, requiring certain requirements to be met in order to be accessed.

1. "...Baby One More Time" – Britney Spears
2. "Born to Be Wild" – Steppenwolf
3. "Cry" – Faith Hill
4. "Drift Away" – Uncle Kracker
5. "Every Breath You Take" – The Police
6. "Friends in Low Places" – Garth Brooks
7. "Genie in a Bottle" – Christina Aguilera
8. "Heartbreak Hotel" – Elvis Presley
9. "Here Without You" – 3 Doors Down
10. "Hot Stuff" – Donna Summer
11. "I Believe in a Thing Called Love" – The Darkness
12. "I Hate (Everything About You)" – Three Days Grace
13. "I Will Survive" – Gloria Gaynor
14. "Irresistible" – Jessica Simpson
15. "It's My Life" – No Doubt
16. "I'll Make Love to You" – Boyz II Men
17. "I'm with You" – Avril Lavigne
18. "I've Got You Under My Skin" – Frank Sinatra
19. "Jessie's Girl" – Rick Springfield
20. "Lady Marmalade" – Patti LaBelle
21. "Let's Get It On" – Marvin Gaye
22. "Miss You" – Aaliyah
23. "My Girl" – The Temptations
24. "Papa Don't Preach" – Madonna
25. "Perfect" – Simple Plan
26. "Rich Girl" – Hall & Oates
27. "Rock and Roll All Nite" – Kiss
28. "(Sittin' on) the Dock of the Bay" – Otis Redding
29. "Sweet Home Alabama" – Lynyrd Skynyrd
30. "The First Cut Is the Deepest" – Sheryl Crow
31. "The Joker" – Steve Miller Band
32. "Toxic" – Britney Spears
33. "Virtual Insanity" – Jamiroquai
34. "We Are Family" – Sister Sledge
35. "White Flag" – Dido

=== Karaoke Revolution Volume 3 – PS2 Only (NTSC) ===
Note: Italics denotes a "locked" song, requiring certain requirements to be met in order to be accessed.

1. "ABC" – The Jackson 5
2. "Against All Odds (Take a Look at Me Now)" – Phil Collins
3. "Ain't No Mountain High Enough" – Marvin Gaye & Tammi Terrell
4. "Beat It" – Michael Jackson
5. "Burn" – Usher
6. "California Dreamin'" – The Mamas & the Papas
7. "Careless Whisper" – George Michael
8. "China Grove" – The Doobie Brothers
9. "Come Clean" – Hilary Duff
10. "Don't You (Forget About Me)" – Simple Minds
11. "Flashdance... What a Feeling" – Irene Cara
12. "Hold On" – Good Charlotte
13. "I Got You Babe" – Sonny & Cher
14. "If I Ain't Got You" – Alicia Keys
15. "In the Midnight Hour" – Wilson Pickett
16. "Joy to the World" – Three Dog Night
17. "The Ketchup Song" – Las Ketchup
18. "Killing Me Softly" – The Fugees
19. "Leave (Get Out)" – JoJo
20. "Love Shack" – The B-52's
21. "Meant to Live" – Switchfoot
22. "My Immortal" – Evanescence
23. "New York, New York" – Frank Sinatra
24. "Oops!... I Did It Again" – Britney Spears
25. "Respect" – Aretha Franklin
26. "Shining Star" – Earth, Wind & Fire
27. "Snake Eater" (from Metal Gear Solid 3: Snake Eater) – Norihiko Hibino feat. Cynthia Harrell
28. "Someday" – Nickelback
29. "Take My Breath Away" – Berlin
30. "Thank You" – Dido
31. "The Reason" – Hoobastank
32. "Twist and Shout" – The Beatles
33. "Unchained Melody" – The Righteous Brothers
34. "Under Pressure" – Queen feat. David Bowie
35. "Waiting For You" (from Silent Hill 4: The Room) – Akira Yamaoka feat. Mary Elizabeth McGlynn
36. "When I'm Gone" – Three Doors Down
37. "Why Can't I?" – Liz Phair
38. "You're the One That I Want" – Olivia Newton-John feat. John Travolta

=== Karaoke Revolution Party (NTSC) (the same as Karaoke Stage 2 in Europe) (also on Xbox and Gamecube) ===
Note: Italics denotes a "locked" song, requiring certain requirements to be met in order to be accessed.

This title is also available, with an identical song selection, on Xbox and GameCube.

1. "(I've Had) The Time of My Life" – Bill Medley and Jennifer Warnes
2. "(You Make Me Feel Like) A Natural Woman" – Aretha Franklin
3. "Ain't Nothing Like the Real Thing" – Marvin Gaye and Tammi Terrell
4. "Ain't Too Proud to Beg" – The Temptations
5. "Always" – Atlantic Starr
6. "American Woman" – Lenny Kravitz
7. "Brick House" – The Commodores
8. "Call Me" – Blondie
9. "Crazy" – Aerosmith
10. "Crazy in Love" – Beyoncé and Jay-Z
11. "Do You Really Want to Hurt Me?" – Culture Club
12. "Drive" – Incubus
13. "Dust in the Wind" – Kansas
14. "Endless Love" – Diana Ross and Lionel Richie
15. "Every Little Thing She Does Is Magic" – The Police
16. "Everybody Wants to Rule the World" – Tears for Fears
17. "Everywhere" – Michelle Branch
18. "Fame" – Irene Cara
19. "Fly" – Hilary Duff
20. "For You I Will" – Monica
21. "Greatest Love of All" – Whitney Houston
22. "Headstrong" – Trapt
23. "Here I Go Again" – Whitesnake
24. "I Don't Want to Be" – Gavin DeGraw
25. "I Left My Heart in San Francisco" – Tony Bennett
26. "I Love Rock 'N Roll" – Joan Jett and the Blackhearts
27. "I Will Always Love You" – Whitney Houston
28. "If You Could Only See" – Tonic
29. "I'll Be" – Edwin McCain
30. "Material Girl" – Madonna
31. "Me and Bobby McGee" – Janis Joplin
32. "Pain" – Jimmy Eat World
33. "Pieces of Me" – Ashlee Simpson
34. "Play That Funky Music" – Wild Cherry
35. "Start Me Up" – The Rolling Stones
36. "Superstition" – Stevie Wonder
37. "Sweet Caroline" – Neil Diamond
38. "Take On Me" – a-ha
39. "Takin' Care of Business" – Bachman-Turner Overdrive
40. "That's Amore" – Dean Martin
41. "The Game of Love" – Santana featuring Michelle Branch
42. "Time After Time" – Cyndi Lauper
43. "Truth Is" – Fantasia
44. "Turn the Beat Around" – Gloria Estefan
45. "Unforgettable" – Nat King Cole with Natalie Cole (duet version)
46. "Uptown Girl" – Billy Joel
47. "Waiting for a Girl Like You" – Foreigner
48. "What I Like About You" – The Romantics
49. "Who Can It Be Now?" – Men at Work
50. "You're My Best Friend" – Queen

=== CMT presents Karaoke Revolution Country (NTSC) ===
Note: Italics denotes a "locked" song, requiring certain requirements to be met in order to be accessed.

1. "9 to 5" – Dolly Parton
2. "All My Ex's Live in Texas" – George Strait
3. "As Good As I Once Was" – Toby Keith
4. "Boot Scootin' Boogie" – Brooks & Dunn
5. "Celebrity" – Brad Paisley
6. "Chattahoochee" – Alan Jackson
7. "Crazy" – Patsy Cline
8. "Does He Love You" – Reba McEntire & Linda Davis
9. "Don't Worry 'Bout a Thing" – SHeDAISY
10. "Friends in Low Places" – Garth Brooks
11. "The Gambler" – Kenny Rogers
12. "Gone" – Montgomery Gentry
13. "Goodbye Earl" – Dixie Chicks
14. "Good Ol' Boys" (Theme song from the television series The Dukes Of Hazzard) – Waylon Jennings
15. "Hot Mama" – Trace Adkins
16. "How Do I Live" – LeAnn Rimes
17. "I Like It, I Love It" – Tim McGraw
18. "I'm Movin' On" – Rascal Flatts
19. "Independence Day" – Martina McBride
20. "It's a Great Day to Be Alive" – Travis Tritt
21. "It's Five O'Clock Somewhere" – Alan Jackson & Jimmy Buffett
22. "It's Your Love" – Tim McGraw & Faith Hill
23. "I Walk the Line" – Johnny Cash
24. "Mammas Don't Let Your Babies Grow up to Be Cowboys" – Waylon Jennings & Willie Nelson
25. "Mud on the Tires" – Brad Paisley
26. "My Give a Damn's Busted" – Jo Dee Messina
27. "On The Road Again" – Willie Nelson
28. "Redneck Woman" – Gretchen Wilson
29. "Save a Horse (Ride a Cowboy)" – Big & Rich
30. "She Thinks My Tractor's Sexy" – Kenny Chesney
31. "Stand By Your Man" – Tammy Wynette
32. "Suds in the Bucket" – Sara Evans
33. "What Was I Thinkin'" – Dierks Bentley
34. "When the Sun Goes Down" – Kenny Chesney & Uncle Kracker
35. "Wide Open Spaces" – Dixie Chicks

=== Glee: Karaoke Revolution ===
1. "And I Am Telling You I'm Not Going" – Dreamgirls
2. "Bust a Move" – Young MC
3. "Can't Fight This Feeling" – REO Speedwagon
4. "Defying Gravity" – Wicked
5. "Don't Rain on My Parade" – Funny Girl
6. "Don't Stand So Close to Me/Young Girl" – The Police/Gary Puckett & The Union Gap
7. "Don't Stop Believin'" – Journey
8. "Endless Love" – Diana Ross and Lionel Richie
9. "Gold Digger" – Kanye West featuring Jamie Foxx
10. "Hair/Crazy in Love" – Hair/Beyoncé Knowles and Jay-Z
11. "Hate on Me" – Jill Scott
12. "I Say a Little Prayer" – Dionne Warwick
13. "I'll Stand by You" – The Pretenders
14. "Imagine" – John Lennon
15. "Keep Holding On" – Avril Lavigne
16. "Lean on Me" – Bill Withers
17. "Leaving on a Jet Plane" – Peter, Paul and Mary
18. "My Life Would Suck Without You" – Kelly Clarkson
19. "No Air" – Jordin Sparks and Chris Brown
20. "Papa Don't Preach" – Madonna
21. "Proud Mary" – Ike and Tina Turner
22. "Push It" – Salt-n-Pepa
23. "Smile" – Charlie Chaplin
24. "Smile" – Lily Allen
25. "Somebody to Love" – Queen
26. "Sweet Caroline" – Neil Diamond
27. "Taking Chances" – Celine Dion
28. "True Colors" – Cyndi Lauper
29. "You Can't Always Get What You Want" – The Rolling Stones

=== Glee Karaoke Revolution: Volume 2 ===
1. "A House Is Not a Home" – Dionne Warwick
2. "Bad Romance" – Lady Gaga
3. "Beautiful" – Christina Aguilera
4. "Beth" – Kiss
5. "Dream a Little Dream of Me" – The Mamas & the Papas
6. "Dream On" – Aerosmith
7. "Gives You Hell" – The All-American Rejects
8. "Good Vibrations" – Marky Mark and the Funky Bunch featuring Loleatta Holloway
9. "Hello, I Love You" – The Doors
10. "Ice Ice Baby" – Vanilla Ice
11. "Jessie's Girl" – Rick Springfield
12. "Like a Virgin" – Madonna
13. "Over the Rainbow" – Israel Kamakawiwo'ole
14. "Pink Houses" – John Mellencamp
15. "Shout It Out Loud" – Kiss
16. "The Boy Is Mine" – Brandy and Monica
17. "The Lady Is a Tramp" – Sammy Davis Jr.
18. "To Sir, with Love" – Lulu
19. "Total Eclipse of the Heart" – Bonnie Tyler
20. "U Can't Touch This" – MC Hammer

=== Glee Karaoke Revolution: Volume 3 ===
- indicates Downloadable Song (Xbox360 Version Only)
1. "Back to Black" – Amy Winehouse
2. "Billionaire" – Travie McCoy featuring Bruno Mars
3. "Blame It (On the Alcohol)" – Jamie Foxx featuring T-Pain
4. "Born This Way" – Lady Gaga
5. "Don't Go Breaking My Heart" – Elton John and Kiki Dee
6. "Fat Bottomed Girls" – Queen
7. "Friday" – Rebecca Black
8. "Go Your Own Way" – Fleetwood Mac
9. "I Don't Want to Know" – Fleetwood Mac
10. "I Follow Rivers" – Lykke Li
11. "I Know What Boys Like" – The Waitresses
12. "I Look to You" – Whitney Houston
13. "I Want to Hold Your Hand" – The Beatles
14. "I've Gotta Be Me" – Sammy Davis Jr.
15. "(I've Had) The Time of My Life" – Bill Medley and Jennifer Warnes
16. "Just the Way You Are" – Bruno Mars
17. "Last Christmas" – Wham!
18. "Loser like Me"
19. "Losing My Religion" – R.E.M.
20. "Lucky" – Jason Mraz and Colbie Caillat
21. "Marry You" – Bruno Mars
22. "Never Going Back Again" – Fleetwood Mac
23. "One of Us" – Joan Osborne
24. "Only the Good Die Young" – Billy Joel
25. "Papa Can You Hear Me?" – Barbra Streisand *
26. "P.Y.T. (Pretty Young Thing)" – Michael Jackson
27. "River Deep - Mountain High" – Ike and Tina Turner
28. "Somebody to Love" – Justin Bieber
29. "Songbird" – Fleetwood Mac
30. "Stop! In the Name of Love/Free Your Mind" – Diana Ross & the Supremes/En Vogue
31. "Sway" – Michael Bublé
32. "The Time Warp" – The Rocky Horror Show
33. "Valerie" – Mark Ronson featuring Amy Winehouse

=== Karaoke Revolution Presents: American Idol (NTSC) ===
Note: Italics denotes a "locked" song, requiring certain requirements to be met in order to be accessed.

1. "All My Life" – K-Ci & JoJo
2. "Alone" – Heart
3. "Always Something There to Remind Me" – Naked Eyes
4. "Be Without You" – Mary J. Blige
5. "Breakaway" – Kelly Clarkson
6. "Build Me Up Buttercup" – The Foundations
7. "Can't Help Falling in Love" – Elvis Presley
8. "Crazy Little Thing Called Love" – Queen
9. "Dilemma" – Nelly & Kelly Rowland
10. "Do I Make You Proud" – Taylor Hicks
11. "Don't Let the Sun Go Down on Me" – Elton John
12. "Don't You Want Me" – The Human League
13. "Easy" – Commodores
14. "Every Rose Has Its Thorn" – Poison
15. "Flying Without Wings" – Ruben Studdard
16. "Heartbreaker" – Pat Benatar
17. "Heaven" – Los Lonely Boys
18. "Hungry Like the Wolf" – Duran Duran
19. "If You Don't Know Me By Now" – Simply Red
20. "It's Not Unusual" – Tom Jones
21. "Just Once" - James Ingram
22. "Just the Way You Are" – Billy Joel
23. "Let's Stay Together" – Al Green
24. "Love Will Keep Us Together" – Captain & Tennille
25. "More Than Words" – Extreme
26. "Photograph" – Nickelback
27. "Piano Man" – Billy Joel
28. "Proud Mary" – Creedence Clearwater Revival
29. "Rock with You" – Michael Jackson
30. "Saving All My Love For You" – Whitney Houston
31. "She Bangs" – Ricky Martin
32. "Stand By Me" – Ben E. King
33. "Stickwitu" – The Pussycat Dolls
34. "Straight Up" – Paula Abdul
35. "Sugar, We're Goin' Down" – Fall Out Boy
36. "The Real Thing" – Bo Bice
37. "Total Eclipse of the Heart" – Bonnie Tyler
38. "Unwritten" – Natasha Bedingfield
39. "What a Girl Wants" – Christina Aguilera
40. "You and Me" – Lifehouse
41. "You've Lost That Lovin' Feelin'" – The Righteous Brothers

=== Karaoke Revolution Presents: American Idol Encore (on PlayStation 2, PlayStation 3, Xbox 360, and Wii) ===
==== On-disc song list ====
Note: Italics denotes a "locked" song, requiring certain requirements to be met in order to be accessed.

1. "Black Hole Sun" – Soundgarden
2. "Black Velvet" – Alannah Myles
3. "Bohemian Rhapsody" – Queen
4. "Close My Eyes Forever" – Ozzy Osbourne and Lita Ford
5. "Come Sail Away" – Styx
6. "Copacabana" – Barry Manilow
7. "Glamorous" – Fergie and Ludacris
8. "Heart of Glass" – Blondie
9. "Hemorrhage (In My Hands)" – Fuel
10. "Holiday" – Madonna
11. "How to Save a Life" – The Fray
12. "(I Can't Get No) Satisfaction" – The Rolling Stones
13. "I Don't Want to Miss a Thing" – Aerosmith
14. "(I Just) Died in Your Arms" – Cutting Crew
15. "In the Air Tonight" – Phil Collins
16. "Irreplaceable" – Beyoncé Knowles
17. "It Ends Tonight" – All American Rejects
18. "It's Still Rock and Roll to Me" – Billy Joel
19. "Knockin' on Heaven's Door" – Guns N' Roses
20. "Lips of an Angel" – Hinder
21. "Midnight Train to Georgia" – Gladys Knight & the Pips
22. "More Than a Feeling" – Boston (5 platinums)
23. "My Cherie Amour" – Stevie Wonder
24. "My Heart Will Go On" – Celine Dion
25. "Over the Rainbow" – Katharine McPhee (15 platinums)
26. "Put Your Records On"- Corinne Bailey Rae
27. "Rio" – Duran Duran
28. "September" – Earth, Wind & Fire
29. "Sister Christian" – Night Ranger
30. "Sweet Dreams (Are Made of This)" – Eurythmics
31. "Tainted Love" – Soft Cell
32. "These Words" – Natasha Bedingfield
33. "Time of the Season" – The Zombies
34. "Tiny Dancer" – Elton John
35. "Too Little Too Late" – JoJo
36. "Unfaithful" – Rihanna
37. "Walking On Sunshine" – Katrina and the Waves
38. "What is Love?" – Haddaway (10 platinums)
39. "You Can't Hurry Love" – Diana Ross and The Supremes
40. "You're Beautiful" – James Blunt

==== Exclusive downloads for the PlayStation 3 and Xbox 360 versions ====
Downloadable songs for the Xbox 360 version were first made available on February 22, 2008. More were added later. Forty-one of these songs were also made available for the PlayStation 3 on March 27, 2008, with more following later. So far, all of the available songs are from previous games in the series, including the first Karaoke Revolution: American Idol game. As of May 14, 2008, there were no more new downloadable songs for this game. The rest of the new songs would continue to be available for the sequel Karaoke Revolution Presents: American Idol Encore 2.

Song title	Artist	Genre	Release date (PlayStation Store)	Release date (Xbox Live Marketplace)
"ABC"	The Jackson 5	Disco	Mar. 27, 2008	Mar. 4, 2008
"Against All Odds (Take a Look at Me Now)"	Phil Collins	Ballad	May 1, 2008	Apr. 15, 2008
"Ain't No Mountain High Enough"	Marvin Gaye & Tammi Terrell	Pop	May 1, 2008	Apr. 15, 2008
"Ain't Nothing Like the Real Thing"	Marvin Gaye and Tammi Terrell	Classics	May 1, 2008	Apr. 29, 2008
"Ain't Too Proud to Beg"	The Temptations	Classics	May 1, 2008	Apr. 29, 2008
"All My Ex's Live In Texas"	George Strait	Country	Mar. 27, 2008	Feb. 19, 2008
"Alone"	Heart	Rock	May 1, 2008	Apr. 15, 2008
"Always Something There to Remind Me"	Naked Eyes	Pop	May 1, 2008	Apr. 15, 2008
"American Woman"	Lenny Kravitz	Rock	May 1, 2008	Apr. 29, 2008
"Baby One More Time"	Britney Spears	Pop	Mar. 27, 2008	Feb. 19, 2008
"Beat It"	Michael Jackson	Pop	Mar. 27, 2008	Mar. 4, 2008
"Billie Jean"	Michael Jackson	Pop	Mar. 27, 2008	Feb. 19, 2008
"Bizarre Love Triangle"	New Order	80's	Mar. 27, 2008	Mar. 4, 2008
"Boot Scootin' Boogie"	Brooks & Dunn	Country	Mar. 27, 2008	Feb. 19, 2008
"Born to Be Wild"	Steppenwolf	Rock	May 1, 2008	Apr. 29, 2008
"Broken Wings"	Mr. Mister	80's	Apr. 24, 2008	Mar. 18, 2008
"Build Me Up Buttercup"	The Foundations	Classics	May 15, 2008	May 15, 2008
"California Dreamin'"	The Mamas & the Papas	Classics	Mar. 27, 2008	Mar. 4, 2008
"Can't Help Falling in Love"	Elvis Presley	Classics	May 15, 2008	May 15, 2008
"Careless Whisper"	George Michael	Ballad	May 1, 2008	Apr. 29, 2008
"Celebration"	Kool & the Gang	Classics	May 15, 2008	May 15, 2008
"Chain of Fools"	Aretha Franklin	Classics	Mar. 27, 2008	Feb. 19, 2008
"Chattahoochee"	Alan Jackson	Country	Mar. 27, 2008	Mar. 4, 2008
"China Grove"	The Doobie Brothers	Rock	Apr. 24, 2008	Mar. 18, 2008
"Complicated"	Avril Lavigne	Rock	May 1, 2008	Apr. 29, 2008
"Crawling in the Dark"	Hoobastank	Hard Rock	Mar. 27, 2008	Feb. 19, 2008
"Crazy"	Patsy Cline	Country	Mar. 27, 2008	Mar. 4, 2008
"Crazy Little Thing Called Love"	Queen	Rock	May 1, 2008	Apr. 15, 2008
"Cry"	Faith Hill	Ballad	Apr. 24, 2008	Apr. 2, 2008
"Do I Make You Proud"	Taylor Hicks	Pop	May 1, 2008	Apr. 15, 2008
"Do You Really Want to Hurt Me?"	Culture Club	80's	May 1, 2008	Apr. 29, 2008
"Does He Love You"	Reba McEntire & Linda Davis	Country	Apr. 24, 2008	Mar. 18, 2008
"Don't Know Why"	Norah Jones	Ballad	Mar. 27, 2008	Mar. 4, 2008
"Drift Away"	Uncle Kracker	Country	May 15, 2008	May 17, 2008
"Drive"	Incubus	Rock	Apr. 24, 2008	Apr. 2, 2008
"Dust In The Wind"	Kansas	Rock	Apr. 24, 2008	Apr. 2, 2008
"Easy"	Commodores	Classics	May 15, 2008	May 15, 2008
"Endless Love"	Diana Ross and Lionel Richie	Ballad	Apr. 24, 2008	Mar. 18, 2008
"Every Breath You Take"	The Police	80's	Apr. 24, 2008	Apr. 2, 2008
"Every Little Thing She Does is Magic"	The Police	80's	May 15, 2008	May 17, 2008
"Every Rose Has Its Thorn"	Poison	Rock	May 1, 2008	Apr. 15, 2008
"Everybody Wants To Rule The World"	Tears For Fears	80's	Apr. 24, 2008	Apr. 2, 2008
"Everything You Want"	Vertical Horizon	Rock	Mar. 27, 2008	Feb. 19, 2008
"Fame"	Irene Cara	Disco	Mar. 27, 2008	Feb. 19, 2008
"Flashdance... What a Feeling"	Irene Cara	80's	May 1, 2008	Apr. 15, 2008
"Fly"	Hilary Duff	Pop	Apr. 24, 2008	Mar. 18, 2008
"Girls Just Want To Have Fun"	Cyndi Lauper	Pop	Mar. 27, 2008	Feb. 19, 2008
"Good Ol' Boys" (Theme song from the television series The Dukes of Hazzard)	Waylon Jennings	Country	Apr. 24, 2008	Mar. 18, 2008
"Greatest Love of All"	Whitney Houston	Ballad	May 1, 2008	Apr. 29, 2008
"Headstrong"	Trapt	Hard Rock	Apr. 24, 2008	Apr. 2, 2008
"Heartbreak Hotel"	Elvis Presley	Classics	Apr. 24, 2008	Apr. 2, 2008
"Heaven"	Los Lonely Boys	Pop	May 15, 2008	May 15, 2008
"Here I Go Again"	Whitesnake	Hard Rock	May 1, 2008	Apr. 15, 2008
"Here Without You"	3 Doors Down	Rock	May 15, 2008	May 15, 2008
"Hey Jealousy"	Gin Blossoms	Rock	Mar. 27, 2008	Feb. 19, 2008
"Hit Me With Your Best Shot"	Pat Benatar	Rock	Mar. 27, 2008	Feb. 19, 2008
"Hold On"	Good Charlotte	Rock	Apr. 24, 2008	Mar. 18, 2008
"Hot Stuff"	Donna Summer	Disco	Apr. 24, 2008	?^{[A]}
"How Do I Live"	LeAnn Rimes	Ballad	Apr. 24, 2008	Apr. 2, 2008
"How You Remind Me"	Nickelback	Rock	Mar. 27, 2008	Feb. 19, 2008
"I Can't Help Myself (Sugar Pie, Honey Bunch)"	The Four Tops	Classics	Mar. 27, 2008	Feb. 19, 2008
"I Don't Want to Be"	Gavin DeGraw	Rock	Apr. 24, 2008	Mar. 18, 2008
"I Got You Babe"	Sonny & Cher	Classics	May 1, 2008	Apr. 15, 2008
"I Hate (Everything About You)"	Three Days Grace	Hard Rock	Mar. 27, 2008	Mar. 4, 2008
"I Heard It Through the Grapevine"	Marvin Gaye	Classics	Mar. 27, 2008	Mar. 4, 2008
"I Left My Heart in San Francisco"	Tony Bennett	Classics	May 15, 2008	May 15, 2008
"I Walk the Line"	Johnny Cash	Country	May 15, 2008	May 15, 2008
"I Want You Back"	The Jackson 5	Classics	Mar. 27, 2008	Mar. 4, 2008
"I Will Survive"	Gloria Gaynor	Disco	Apr. 24, 2008	Apr. 1, 2008
"I'll Be"	Edwin McCain	Pop	May 15, 2008	May 15, 2008
"I'll Be There"	The Jackson 5	Classics	Apr. 24, 2008	Mar, 18, 2008
"I'll Make Love to You"	Boyz II Men	R&B	Mar. 27, 2008	Mar. 4 2008^{[B]}
"I'm Coming Out"	Diana Ross	Disco	May 1, 2008	Apr. 29, 2008
"I'm With You"	Avril Lavigne	Rock	May 15, 2008	May 15, 2008
"I've Got You Under My Skin"	Frank Sinatra	Classics	Apr. 24, 2008	Apr. 2, 2008
"If I Ain't Got You"	Alicia Keys	R&B	May 1, 2008	Apr. 15, 2008
"If You Could Only See"	Tonic	Rock	Apr. 24, 2008	Apr. 2, 2008
"Independence Day"	Martina McBride	Country	Apr. 24, 2008	Apr. 2, 2008
"It's the End of the World As We Know It"	R.E.M.	Rock	Mar. 27, 2008	Mar. 4, 2008
"It's Your Love"	Tim McGraw & Faith Hill	Country	May 1, 2008	Apr. 15, 2008
"Jessie's Girl"	Rick Springfield	80's	Mar. 27, 2008	Feb. 19, 2008
"Joy To The World"	Three Dog Night	Classics	Apr. 24, 2008	Apr. 1, 2008
"Just My Imagination (Running Away With Me)"	The Temptations	Classics	Mar. 27, 2008	Mar. 4, 2008
"Just the Way You Are"	Billy Joel	Pop	May 1, 2008	Apr. 15, 2008
"Kiss Me"	Sixpence None The Richer	Pop	Mar. 27, 2008	?
"Ladies' Night"	Kool & the Gang	Disco	May 1, 2008	Apr. 15, 2008
"Lady Marmalade"	Patti LaBelle	Classics	Apr. 24, 2008	?^{[A]}
"Let's Get It On"	Marvin Gaye	Classics	May 1, 2008	?^{[A]}
"Let's Stay Together"	Al Green	Classics	May 15, 2008	May 15, 2008
"Like A Virgin"	Madonna	Pop	Mar. 27, 2008	?^{[A]}
"Love Shack"	The B-52's	Pop	Mar. 27, 2008	Mar. 4, 2008
"Love Will Keep Us Together"	Captain & Tennille	Pop	May 1, 2008	Apr. 29, 2008
"Material Girl"	Madonna	Pop	Apr. 24, 2008	Apr. 2, 2008
"Meant to Live"	Switchfoot	Hard Rock	Apr. 24, 2008	Mar. 18, 2008
"Miss You"	Aaliyah	R&B	Apr. 24, 2008	Mar. 18, 2008
"More Than Words"	Extreme	Ballad	May 15, 2008	May 15, 2008
"My Girl"	The Temptations	Classics	May 1, 2008	Apr. 15, 2008
"New York, New York"	Frank Sinatra	Classics	May 1, 2008	Apr. 29, 2008
"On The Road Again"	Willie Nelson	Country	May 1, 2008	Apr. 15, 2008
"One Week"	Barenaked Ladies	Rock	Mar. 27, 2008	Mar. 4, 2008
"Oops!...I Did it Again"	Britney Spears	Pop	Mar. 27, 2008	Mar. 4, 2008
"Photograph"	Nickelback	Rock	May 1, 2008	Apr. 29, 2008
"Pieces of Me"	Ashlee Simpson	Pop	Apr. 24, 2008	Apr. 2, 2008
"Please Mr. Postman"	The Marvelettes	Classics	Mar. 27, 2008	Mar. 4, 2008
"Proud Mary"	Creedence Clearwater Revival	Rock	May 1, 2008	Apr. 29, 2008
"Respect"	Aretha Franklin	Classics	May 1, 2008	Apr. 15, 2008
"Rich Girl"	Hall & Oates	Pop	?	Mar. 4, 2008
"Rock and Roll All Nite"	Kiss	Hard Rock	May 15, 2008	May 15, 2008
"Save Tonight"	Eagle Eye Cherry	Pop	Mar. 27, 2008	Feb. 19, 2008
"She Talks to Angels"	Black Crowes	Rock	Mar. 27, 2008	Mar. 4, 2008
"Shining Star"	Earth, Wind & Fire	Disco	Mar. 27, 2008	Feb. 19, 2008
"(Sittin' on) the Dock of the Bay"	Otis Redding	Classics	Apr. 24, 2008	Mar. 18, 2008
"Someday"	Nickelback	Rock	Apr. 24, 2008	Mar. 18, 2008
"Son of a Preacher Man"	Dusty Springfield	Classics	Mar. 27, 2008	Feb. 19, 2008
"Stand By Your Man"	Tammy Wynette	Country	May 1, 2008	Apr. 29, 2008
"Start Me Up"	The Rolling Stones	Rock	Apr. 24, 2008	Apr. 2, 2008
"Stop! In the Name of Love"	Diana Ross & The Supremes	Classics	Apr. 24, 2008	Mar. 18, 2008
"Straight Up"	Paula Abdul	Pop	May 1, 2008	Apr. 29, 2008
"Sugar, We're Goin' Down"	Fall Out Boy	Hard Rock	May 1, 2008	?^{[A]}
"Sweet Home Alabama"	Lynyrd Skynyrd	Rock	May 15, 2008	May 15, 2008
"Take My Breath Away"	Berlin	80's	Mar. 27, 2008	Feb. 19, 2008
"Take On Me"	a-ha	Pop	Apr. 24, 2008	Apr. 1, 2008
"Takin' Care of Business"	Bachman-Turner Overdrive	Rock	May 1, 2008	Apr. 15, 2008
"Thank You"	Dido	Pop	May 15, 2008	May 15, 2008
"The First Cut is the Deepest"	Sheryl Crow	Rock	May 1, 2008	Apr. 29, 2008
"The Real Thing"	Bo Bice	Rock	May 1, 2008	Apr. 29, 2008
"The Reason"	Hoobastank	Rock	Apr. 24, 2008	Mar. 18, 2008
"The Tracks of My Tears"	Smokey Robinson & The Miracles	Classics	Apr. 24, 2008	Mar. 18, 2008
"This Old Heart of Mine (Is Weak For You)"	The Isley Brothers	Classics	Apr. 24, 2008	Mar. 18, 2008
"Time After Time"	Cyndi Lauper	Pop	Apr. 24, 2008	Apr. 1, 2008
"Truth Is"	Fantasia	R&B	May 15, 2008	Apr. 15, 2008
"Turn The Beat Around"	Gloria Estefan	Pop	Apr. 24, 2008	Apr. 1, 2008
"Uptown Girl"	Billy Joel	Pop	May 15, 2008	May 15, 2008
"Virtual Insanity"	Jamiroquai	Pop	Mar. 27, 2008	Mar. 4, 2008
"We Are Family"	Sister Sledge	Disco	Apr. 24, 2008	Mar. 18, 2008
"What Becomes of the Broken Hearted"	Jimmy Ruffin	Classics	Apr. 24, 2008	Apr. 1, 2008
"When a Man Loves a Woman"	Percy Sledge	Classics	Mar. 27, 2008	Feb. 19, 2008
"When I'm Gone"	Three Doors Down	Rock	May 15, 2008	May 15, 2008
"When the Sun Goes Down"	Kenny Chesney and Uncle Kracker	Country	May 1, 2008	Apr. 29, 2008
"Who Can It Be Now?"	Men at Work	Pop	May 1, 2008	Apr. 15, 2008
"Why Can't I"	Liz Phair	Pop	Apr. 24, 2008	Mar. 18, 2008
"Wide Open Spaces"	Dixie Chicks	Country	May 15, 2008	May 15, 2008
"Wind Beneath My Wings"	Bette Midler	Ballad	Apr. 24, 2008	Mar. 18, 2008
"You and Me"	Lifehouse	Pop	May 1, 2008	Apr. 29, 2008
"(You Make Me Feel Like) A Natural Woman"	Aretha Franklin	Classics	May 1, 2008	Apr. 29, 2008
"You Really Got Me"	Van Halen	Rock	Mar. 27, 2008	Mar. 4, 2008
"You're My Best Friend"	Queen	Pop	May 1, 2008	Apr. 15, 2008
"You're the One That I Want"	John Travolta and Olivia Newton-John	Pop	Apr. 24, 2008	Mar. 18, 2008

- ^{A} As of May 27, 2008 (if not earlier), the song, which was previously available for download, was no longer available on Xbox Live Marketplace, but remained available on the PlayStation Store.
- ^{B} Song was not available on Xbox Live Marketplace as of May 27, 2008; but was remade available again as of November 13, 2008.

=== Karaoke Revolution Presents: American Idol Encore 2 (on PlayStation 3, Xbox 360, and Wii) ===
==== On-disc song list ====
Note: Italics denotes a "locked" song, requiring certain requirements to be met in order to be accessed.

Song title	Artist	Genre
"867-5309/Jenny"	Tommy Tutone	80's
"Apologize"	OneRepublic	R&B
"Big Girls Don't Cry"	Fergie	R&B
"Crazy in Love"	Beyoncé feat. Jay-Z	R&B
"Dance Like There's No Tomorrow"	Paula Abdul (original version) (20 platinums)	Pop
"Don't Know Much"	Linda Ronstadt and Aaron Neville	Ballad
"Don't Stop 'til You Get Enough"	Michael Jackson	Classics
"Enjoy The Silence"	Depeche Mode	80's
"Eye Of The Tiger"	Survivor	Rock
"Hey There Delilah"	Plain White T's	Ballad
"I'm Every Woman"	Whitney Houston	Disco
"I'm Like a Bird"	Nelly Furtado	Pop
"If It Makes You Happy"	Sheryl Crow	Rock
"Imagine"	John Lennon	Classics
"Islands in the Stream"	Kenny Rogers and Dolly Parton	Country
"It's Not Over"	Daughtry (10 platinums)	Rock
"Just the Two of Us"	Grover Washington Jr. and Bill Withers	Classics
"Life Is a Highway"	Rascal Flatts	Rock
"Livin' On a Prayer"	Bon Jovi	Rock
"Losing My Religion"	R.E.M.	Rock
"Maggie May"	Rod Stewart	Classics
"Maneater"	Hall & Oates	80's
"Mr. Brightside"	The Killers	Rock
"My Happy Ending"	Avril Lavigne	Rock
"Over My Head (Cable Car)"	The Fray	Pop
"Paint It Black"	The Rolling Stones	Rock
"Pinball Wizard"	The Who	Rock
"Rocket Man"	Elton John	Classics
"Seven Nation Army"	The White Stripes	Rock
"Since U Been Gone"	Kelly Clarkson (2 platinums)	Pop
"Speed of Sound"	Coldplay	Pop
"Stayin' Alive"	Bee Gees	Disco
"Take Me Out"	Franz Ferdinand	Rock
"That's the Way (I Like It)"	KC and the Sunshine Band	Disco
"The Sweet Escape"	Gwen Stefani	Pop
"Vacation"	The Go-Go's	80's
"Wait For You"	Elliott Yamin (15 platinums)	R&B
"Wannabe"	The Spice Girls	Pop
"Who Knew"	Pink	Pop
"Y.M.C.A."	The Village People	Disco

Exactly the same version of "Crazy in Love" that was previously used in Karaoke Revolution: Party. It is a replacement for the song "Makes Me Wonder."

==== Exclusive downloads for the PlayStation 3 and Xbox 360 versions only ====
All downloadable songs for Karaoke Revolution Presents American Idol Encore (see list above) are imported to the PlayStation 3 and Xbox 360 versions of Karaoke Revolution Presents: American Idol Encore 2. For players who do not own Karaoke Revolution Presents: American Idol Encore, the downloadable songs can be purchased from either the PlayStation Store (PlayStation 3 owners), Xbox Live Marketplace (Xbox 360 owners) or the in-game "Downloadable Content" store.

==== Brand New PlayStation 3 and Xbox 360 downloadable songs ====
This is the complete finalized list of the new downloadable songs are available for both PlayStation 3 and Xbox 360 version of Karaoke Revolution Presents: American Idol Encore 2. Some of the downloadable songs were from the previous Karaoke Revolution Presents: American Idol Encore. All items are listed per the official PlayStation Store website and the official Xbox LIVE Marketplace website. On March 2, 2009, the downloadable song "Black Velvet" was released for the Xbox 360 version and it is misdownloaded as the song "Hemorrhage (In My Hands)". This problem was fixed on March 6, 2009. Recently, Konami released 5 downloadable rock songs in their original versions found from their other musical game Rock Revolution; however, as of mid-April 2009, 4 of those songs were no longer available from the Xbox Live Marketplace for undisclosed reasons. "The Joker And The Thief" is the only downloadable song remaining for the Xbox 360. The PlayStation 3 still remains available to purchase all 5 of the new downloadable songs. As of March 31, 2009, there will permanently be no more new downloadable songs for this game as the Karaoke Revolution series has seen the last of its cover versions. With the new rebooted version of Karaoke Revolution coming out, all will be master recordings and new downloadable songs for that version will also be master recordings. On June 2, 2009, the PlayStation 3 version's downloadable songs "Heartbreaker" and "I Don't Want To Miss A Thing" were no longer available in the PlayStation Store.

Song title	Artist	Genre	Release date (PlayStation Store)	Release date (Xbox Live Marketplace)
"(I Just) Died In Your Arms"	Cutting Crew	80's	Nov. 20, 2008	Nov. 18, 2008
"(I've Had) The Time of My Life"	Bill Medley & Jennifer Warnes	Pop	Mar. 26, 2009	No Xbox 360 release
"All My Life"	K-Ci & JoJo	R&B	Nov. 25, 2008	Nov. 25, 2008
"All You Wanted"	Michelle Branch	Rock	Nov. 20, 2008	No Xbox 360 release
"Are You Happy Now"	Michelle Branch	Rock	Nov. 25, 2008	Nov. 25, 2008
"Black Hole Sun"	Soundgarden	Rock	Nov. 20, 2008	Nov. 18, 2008
"Black Velvet"	Alannah Myles	Rock	Mar. 19, 2009	Mar. 2, 2009
"Breakaway"	Kelly Clarkson	Pop	Jan. 29, 2009	Feb. 27, 2009
"Brick House"	The Commodores	Classics	Mar. 19, 2009	Feb. 27, 2009
"Call Me"	Blondie	80's	Mar. 19, 2009	Feb. 17, 2009
"Dance, Dance"	Fall Out Boy	Rock	Mar. 26, 2009	Mar. 31, 2009 (discontinued May 2009)
"Don't You (Forget About Me)"	Simple Minds	80's	Dec. 4, 2008	No Xbox 360 release
"For You I Will"	Monica	R&B	Dec. 4, 2008	Dec. 2, 2008
"Friends In Low Places"	Garth Brooks	Country	Dec. 4, 2008	Dec. 2, 2008
"Heart Of Glass"	Blondie	80's	Dec. 11, 2008	Dec. 9, 2008
"Heartbreaker"	Pat Benatar	Rock	Nov. 25, 2008 (discontinued on 6/2/2009)	Nov. 25, 2008
"Hemorrhage (In My Hands)"	Fuel	Hard Rock	Mar. 19, 2009	Mar. 2, 2009
"Holiday"	Madonna	80's	Dec. 18, 2008	Feb. 15, 2009
"How To Save A Life"	The Fray	Rock	Dec. 11, 2008	Feb. 16, 2009
"I Don't Want To Miss a Thing"	Aerosmith	Rock	Dec. 18, 2008 (discontinued on 6/2/2009)	Feb. 16, 2009
"I Love Rock and Roll"	Joan Jett and the Blackhearts	Rock	Mar. 26, 2009	Mar. 31, 2009
"If You Don't Know Me By Now"	Simply Red	Ballad	Jan. 29, 2009	Feb. 16, 2009
"In the Air Tonight"	Phil Collins	Ballad	Dec. 23, 2008	Feb. 16, 2009
"Irreplaceable"	Beyoncé Knowles	R&B	Jan. 29, 2009	Feb. 16, 2009
"Irresistible"	Jessica Simpson	Pop	Mar. 26, 2009	No Xbox 360 release
"It's Not Unusual"	Tom Jones	Classics	Nov. 20, 2008	Nov. 18, 2008
"Joker and the Thief"	Wolfmother	Hard Rock	Mar. 26, 2009	Mar. 31, 2009
"Killing Me Softly"	The Fugees	R&B	Jan. 29, 2009	Feb. 16, 2009
"Knockin' On Heaven's Door"	Guns N' Roses	Rock	Dec. 4, 2008	Dec. 2, 2008
"Lips of an Angel"	Hinder	Rock	Dec. 18, 2008	Feb. 16, 2009
"Midnight Train to Georgia"	Gladys Knight & The Pips	Classics	Dec. 4, 2008	Dec. 2, 2008
"More Than a Feeling"	Boston	Rock	Mar. 19, 2009	Feb. 16, 2009
"My Immortal"	Evanescence	Rock	Mar. 26, 2009	Mar. 31, 2009
"Over The Rainbow"	Katharine McPhee	Classics	Dec. 11, 2008	Dec. 9, 2008
"Put Your Records On"	Corinne Bailey Rae	Pop	Mar. 26, 2009	Mar. 31, 2009
"Rio"	Duran Duran	80's	Mar. 19, 2009	Feb. 16, 2009
"Saving All My Love For You"	Whitney Houston	R&B	Mar. 19, 2009	Feb. 16, 2009
"September"	Earth, Wind & Fire	Disco	Nov. 20, 2008	Nov. 18, 2008
"Sister Christian"	Night Ranger	Rock	Jan. 29, 2009	Feb. 16, 2009
"Smooth Criminal"	Alien Ant Farm	Rock	Mar. 19, 2009	Feb. 16, 2009
"Spoonman"	Soundgarden	Hard Rock	Mar. 26, 2009	Mar. 31, 2009 (discontinued May 2009)
"Stand By Me"	Ben E. King	Classics	Dec. 18, 2008	Feb. 16, 2009
"Stickwitu"	The Pussycat Dolls	R&B	Mar. 19, 2009	Feb. 17, 2009
"Sweet Caroline"	Neil Diamond	Classics	Mar. 26, 2009	Mar. 31, 2009
"Tainted Love"	Soft Cell	80's	Mar. 19, 2009	Feb. 17, 2009
"These Words"	Natasha Bedingfield	Pop	Mar. 19, 2009	Mar. 2, 2009
"The Spirit of Radio"	Rush	Rock	Mar. 26, 2009	Mar. 31, 2009 (discontinued May 2009)
"Time of the Season"	The Zombies	Classics	Dec. 23, 2008	Feb. 16, 2009
"Too Little Too Late"	JoJo	Pop	Dec. 23, 2008	Feb. 16, 2009
"Toxic"	Britney Spears	Pop	Mar. 19, 2009	Mar. 2, 2009
"Twist and Shout"	The Beatles	Classics	Jan. 29, 2009	Feb. 16, 2009
"Unchained Melody"	The Righteous Brothers	Classics	Mar. 19, 2009	Feb. 16, 2009
"Unfaithful"	Rihanna	R&B	Nov. 25, 2008	Nov. 25, 2008
"Unforgettable"	Nat King Cole with Natalie Cole	Classics	Mar. 19, 2009	Feb. 16, 2009
"Unwritten"	Natasha Bedingfield	Pop	Dec. 4, 2008	Dec. 2, 2008
"Waiting For a Girl Like You"	Foreigner	80's	Mar. 19, 2009	Mar. 2, 2009
"Waiting For Tonight"	Jennifer Lopez	Pop	Dec. 11, 2008	Dec. 9, 2008
"What I Like About You"	The Romantics	80's	Mar. 19, 2009	Feb. 16, 2009
"What Is Love?"	Haddaway	Pop	Dec. 18, 2008	Feb. 16, 2009
"You Can't Hurry Love"	Diana Ross & The Supremes	Classics	Mar. 19, 2009	Feb. 17, 2009
"You've Lost That Lovin' Feeling"	The Righteous Brothers	Classics	Mar. 19, 2009	No Xbox 360 release
"Youth Gone Wild"	Skid Row	Hard Rock	Mar. 26, 2009	Mar. 31, 2009 (discontinued May 2009)

== Xbox version ==
The Xbox version of Karaoke Revolution has some changes, and is not the same as Karaoke Revolution Party for Xbox.

The Xbox version has 50 songs that come with the game. "One Week", "Science Genius Girl", and "This Old Heart of Mine (Is Weak For You)" are unlockable songs.

The songlist is made up of 36 songs from KR1 on the PS2, 10 Motown songs not from previous Karaoke Revolution games, and 4 songs from KR2 on the PS2.

1. "Addicted" – Simple Plan
2. "All You Wanted" – Michelle Branch
3. "Are You Happy Now?" – Michelle Branch
4. "Believe" – Cher
5. "Billie Jean" – Michael Jackson
6. "Bizarre Love Triangle" – New Order
7. "Broken Wings" – Mr. Mister
8. "Celebration" – Kool & the Gang
9. "Chain of Fools" – Aretha Franklin
10. "Complicated" – Avril Lavigne
11. "Crawling in the Dark" – Hoobastank
12. "Don't Know Why" – Norah Jones
13. "Every Morning" – Sugar Ray
14. "Everything You Want" – Vertical Horizon
15. "Girls Just Want To Have Fun" – Cyndi Lauper
16. "Heartbreak Hotel" – Elvis Presley
17. "Hey Jealousy" – Gin Blossoms
18. "Hit Me With Your Best Shot" – Pat Benatar
19. "Hot Stuff" – Donna Summer
20. "How You Remind Me" – Nickelback
21. "I Can't Help Myself (Sugar Pie, Honey Bunch)" – The Four Tops
22. "I Heard It Through the Grapevine" – Marvin Gaye
23. "I Want You Back" – The Jackson 5
24. "I'll Be There" – The Jackson 5
25. "I'm Coming Out" – Diana Ross
26. "It's the End of the World as We Know It (and I Feel Fine)" – R.E.M.
27. "I've Got You Under My Skin" – Frank Sinatra
28. "Just My Imagination"- The Temptations
29. "Kiss Me" – Sixpence None the Richer
30. "Ladies' Night" – Kool & The Gang
31. "Like a Virgin" – Madonna
32. "One Week" – Barenaked Ladies
33. "Please Mr. Postman" – The Marvelettes
34. "Red Red Wine" – UB40
35. "Save Tonight" – Eagle Eye Cherry
36. "Science Genius Girl" – Freezepop
37. "She Talks to Angels" – Black Crowes
38. "Smooth Criminal" – Michael Jackson
39. "Son of a Preacher Man" – Dusty Springfield
40. "Stop! In the Name of Love" – Diana Ross & The Supremes
41. "The Power of Love" – Huey Lewis and the News
42. "The Tracks of My Tears" – Smokey Robinson & The Miracles
43. "This Old Heart of Mine (Is Weak For You)" – The Isley Brothers
44. "Waiting for Tonight" – Jennifer Lopez
45. "We Are Family" – Sister Sledge
46. "What Becomes of the Broken Hearted" – Jimmy Ruffin
47. "When a Man Loves a Woman" – Percy Sledge
48. "Wind Beneath My Wings" – Bette Midler
49. "You Really Got Me" – Van Halen
50. "You're the One That I Want" – Olivia Newton-John

=== The 10 Motown songs on the Xbox version ===
These songs use the original Motown recordings. (Some of them have to be unlocked)

1. I Can't Help Myself (Sugar Pie, Honey Bunch) – Four Tops
2. I Heard It Through the Grapevine – Marvin Gaye
3. I Want You Back – The Jackson 5
4. I'll Be There – The Jackson 5
5. Just My Imagination (Running Away with Me) – The Temptations
6. Please Mr. Postman – The Marvelettes
7. Stop! In the Name of Love – Diana Ross & the Supremes
8. The Tracks of My Tears – Smokey Robinson & the Miracles
9. This Old Heart of Mine (Is Weak For You) – The Isley Brothers
10. What Becomes of the Brokenhearted – Jimmy Ruffin

=== Xbox Live Downloads for Karaoke Revolution and Karaoke Revolution Party ===
Xbox Live online in-game content downloads allow users to 'download' new tracks for the Xbox releases of Karaoke Revolution and Karaoke Revolution Party. These songs are included on the Karaoke Revolution Party disk in a hidden format, and are unlocked through Xbox Live. It is also possible to manually unlock tracks on Development Xboxes and modded Xboxes.

All song packs except XRXB1 (The free bonus pack) are US$4.99. All 20 songpacks are also sold together in the "XRXM1: MegaPack" for $79.99.

KRX01: Classic Rock: "Born to be Wild", "Every Breath You Take", "Rock and Roll All Night", "Sweet Home Alabama", and "The Joker".

KRX02: Modern Rock: "Here Without You", "I Believe in a Thing Called Love", "I Hate Everything About You", "It's My Life", and "Perfect".

KRX03: Pop: "Cry", "Miss You", "Papa Don't Preach", "The First Cut is the Deepest", and "White Flag".

KRX04: Top 40: "... Baby One More Time", "Genie in a Bottle", "I'm With You", "Irresistible", and "Toxic".

KRX05: Classics: "Drift Away", "Let's Get It On", "My Girl", "Rich Girl", and "(Sittin' On) The Dock of the Bay".

KRX06: Mix: "Friends in Low Places", "I Will Survive", "Lady Marmalade", "I'll Make Love to You", "Virtual Insanity", and "Jessie's Girl".

KRX07: Sing and Dance: "Beat It", "Don't You (Forget About Me)", "Flashdance...What a Feeling", "Oops!...I Did It Again", "Twist and Shout"

KRX08: Duets: "Ain't No Mountain High Enough", "California Dreaming", "I Got You Babe", "Respect", "Under Pressure"

KRX09: Modern Rock 2: "Hold On", "Meant to Live", "Someday", "The Reason", "When I'm Gone"

KRX10: Top 40 2: "Come Clean", "My Immortal", "Leave (Get Out)", "Thank You", "Why Can't I"

KRX11: Soul and R&B: "ABC", "Burn", "If I Ain't Got You", "Killing Me Softly", "Shining Star"

XRX12: Pop 2: "Against All Odds", "Careless Whisper", "Love Shack", "Take My Breath Away", "You're the One that I Want"

KRX13: Classics 2: "China Grove", "In the Midnight Hour", "Joy to the World", "New York New York", "Unchained Melody"

KRX14: Hard Rock: "Crawling in the Dark", "Hit Me With Your Best Shot", "How You Remind Me", "She Talks to Angels", "You Really Got Me"

KRX15: 80s Pop: "Billie Jean", "Broken Wings", "Girls Just Want to Have Fun", "Like a Virgin", "The Power of Love"

KRX16: 70s Disco: "Celebration", "Hot Stuff", "I'm Coming Out", "Ladies Night", "We Are Family"

KRX17: Classics 3: "Chain of Fools", "Heartbreak Hotel", "I've Got You Under My Skin", "Son of a Preacher Man", "When a Man Loves a Woman"

KRX18: Mix 2: "Bizarre Love Triangle", "It's the End of the World As We Know It", "Kiss Me", "One Week", "Wind Beneath My Wings"

KRX19: Modern Rock 3: "Addicted", "Every Morning", "Everything You Want", "Hey Jealousy", "Save Tonight"

KRX20: Top 40 3: "All You Wanted", "Are You Happy Now?", "Believe", "Complicated", "Don't Know Why", "Waiting For Tonight"

XRXB1: Free Bonus Pack: "Science Genius Girl", "Snake Eater", "Waiting For You"

== Song Lists – Japan ==
With at least nine volumes of J-Pop Best alone, as well as several themed releases, there are many more expansions of this game available in Japan compared to North America.

Including the song lists shown below, there are also two children's / family-themed releases, Karaoke Revolution Kazoku Idol Sengen and Karaoke Revolution Kids Song Selection.

=== Karaoke Revolution J-Pop Best Collection Volume 1 ===
1. "Ano hikouki kumori sora watte" – 19
2. "Boyfriend" – aiko
3. "Sakura no toki" – aiko
4. "Every Heart -minna no kimochi-" – BoA
5. "Jewel Song" – BoA
6. "Tentai Kansoku" – Bump of Chicken
7. "You Go Your Way" – Chemistry
8. "Kimi o sagashiteta -New Jersey United-" – Chemistry
9. "Hi no Ataru Sakamichi" – Do As Infinity
10. "Kuchibashi ni Cherry" – EGO-WRAPPIN'
11. "Winter, again" – Glay
12. "Rocket Dive" – hide with Spread Beaver
13. "Samurai Drive" – hitomi
14. "Sobakasu" – Judy and Mary
15. "Nemurenu yoru wa kimi no sei" – Misia
16. "Ai suru hana" – Mongol 800
17. "Na mo naki uta" – Mr. Children
18. "Hero" – Mr. Children
19. "One" – Rip SLYME
20. "Linda Linda" – The Blue Hearts
21. "Jōnetsu no Bara" – The Blue Hearts
22. "Secret Base -Kimi ga kureta mono-" – ZONE
23. "Ikiteru kototte subarashii" – Kuzu
24. "Single Bed" – Sharam Q
25. "Sora mo toberu hazu" – Spitz
26. "Cherry" – Spitz
27. "Love Machine" – Morning Musume
28. "Koko ni iru zee" – Morning Musume
29. "Sakura -dokushou-" – Moriyama Naotaro
30. "Friends" – Rebecca
31. "Taisetsu na mono" – Road of Major
32. "Colors" – Hikaru Utada
33. "First Love" – Hikaru Utada
34. "Sign" – Onitsuka Chihiro
35. "Lifetime Respect" – Miki Dozan
36. "Koi ni ochite (Fall in Love)" – Kobayashi Akiko
37. "Kaze no rarara" – Kuraki Mai
38. "Will" – Nakashima Mika
39. "Tonbo" – Nagabuchi Tsuyoshi
40. "Itsu no hi ni ka" – Shimatani Hitomi
41. "Oh My Little Girl" – Ozaki Yutaka
42. "Love -Destiny-" – Ayumi Hamasaki
43. "Appears" – Ayumi Hamasaki
44. "Seasons" – Ayumi Hamasaki
45. "M" – Ayumi Hamasaki
46. "July 1st" – Ayumi Hamasaki
47. "Hanabi" – Ayumi Hamasaki
48. "Voyage" – Ayumi Hamasaki
49. "Everywhere Nowhere" – Ayumi Hamasaki
50. "Heartplace" – Ayumi Hamasaki

=== Karaoke Revolution J-Pop Best Collection Volume 2 ===
1. "Kabutomushi" – aiko
2. "Listen to My Heart" – BoA
3. "It Takes Two" – Chemistry
4. "Solid Dream" – Chemistry
5. "My Faith" – day after tomorrow
6. "Fantasista" – Dragon Ash
7. "Mirai yosouzu II" – Dreams Come True
8. "Fragile" – Every Little Thing
9. "song for you" – EXILE
10. "Kiss you" – EXILE
11. "Zutto futari de" – Glay
12. "Haru o ai suru hito" – Glay
13. "Way of Difference" – Glay
14. "Moshimo kimi ga nakunaraba" – Going Steady
15. "Chiisana koi no uta" – Mongol 800
16. "Youthful Days" – Mr. Children
17. "Rakuen Baby" – Rip SLYME
18. "White Love" – Speed
19. "Train-Train" – The Blue Hearts
20. "Towa ni" – The Gospellers
21. "Kaze" – Kobukuro
22. "Tsunami" – Southern All Stars
23. "Saboten no hana" – Tulip
24. "Mugen" – Porno Graffitti
25. "The Peace" – Morning Musume
26. "Natsuiro" – Yuzu
27. "Can You Celebrate" – Amuro Namie
28. "Shounen Jidai" – Inoue Yosui
29. "Automatic" – Hikaru Utada
30. "I'm Proud" – Kahala Tomomi
31. "Touch" – Yoshimi Iwasaki
32. "Gekko" – Onitsuka Chihiro
33. "Wadatsumi no ki" – Hajime Chitose
34. "For You..." – Takahashi Mariko
35. "Momoiro toiki" – Takahashi Mariko
36. "Gomen ne..." – Takahashi Mariko
37. "Pride" – Imai Miki
38. "Anata no kisu o kazoemashou -You Were Mine-" – Koyanagi Yuki
39. "Yeah! Meccha Holiday" – Matsuura Aya
40. "Chijo no hoshi" – Nakajima Miyuki
41. "True Love" – Fujii Fumiya
42. "I Love You" – Ozaki Yutaka
43. "Evolution" – Ayumi Hamasaki
44. "Who ..." – Ayumi Hamasaki
45. "We Wish" – Ayumi Hamasaki
46. "Real Me" – Ayumi Hamasaki
47. "A Song is Born" – Ayumi Hamasaki & keiko
48. "Squall" – Fukuyama Masaharu
49. "Life Is ...: Another Story" – Ken Hirai
50. "Boku no namae o yonda ato ni" – Makihara Noriyuki

=== Karaoke Revolution J-Pop Best Collection Volume 3 ===
1. "Sakura" – 175R
2. "Sora ni utaeba" – 175R
3. "Cho" – B-DASH
4. "Valenti" – BoA
5. "Pieces of a Dream" – Chemistry
6. "Kimi o sagashiteta -The Wedding Song-" – Chemistry
7. "Grateful Days" – Dragon Ash
8. "Time Goes By" – Every Little Thing
9. "Unspeakable" – Every Little Thing
10. "Tears" – Fayray
11. "Koi no uta" – Go! Go! 7188
12. "Ginga tetsudou no yoru" – Going Steady
13. "Nanimo ienakute ... natsu" – Jaywalk
14. "Over Drive" – Judy and Mary
15. "The Perfect Vision" – Minmi
16. "Everything" – Misia
17. "Ryūkyū Love Song" – Mongol 800
18. "Mujun no ue ni saku hana" – Mongol 800
19. "Dakishimetai" – Mr. Children
20. "Innocent World" – Mr. Children
21. "Tomorrow Never Knows" – Mr. Children
22. "Ima o dakishimete" – Noa
23. "Tsuki no shizuku" – Rui
24. "Yozora no mukou" – SMAP
25. "Sekai ni hitotsu dake no hana" – SMAP
26. "Jam" – The Yellow Monkey
27. "Moonlight" – Kuzu
28. "Tomodachi" – Ketsumeishi
29. "Kachofugetsu" – Ketsumeishi
30. "Shall We Love?" – Gomattō
31. "Seishun" – The High-Lows
32. "Itoshi no Eri" – Southern All Stars
33. "Do It! Now" – Morning Musume
34. "Itsuka" – Yuzu
35. "Koi no kayoubi" – Yuzu
36. "Say the Word" – Amuro Namie
37. "I Will" – Amuro Namie
38. "Wishing on the Same Star" – Amuro Namie
39. "Wine Red no kokoro" – Anzen Chitai
40. "Traveling" – Hikaru Utada
41. "Get Along Together" – Yamane Yasuhiro
42. "Good Bye Natsuo" – Matsuura Aya
43. "Anata ni aitakute ~Missing You~" – Matsuda Seiko
44. "Stars" – Nakashima Mika
45. "Aishiteru" – Nakashima Mika
46. "A Song for xx" – Ayumi Hamasaki
47. "I Am ..." – Ayumi Hamasaki
48. "Sakurazaka" – Fukuyama Masaharu
49. "Ookina furudokei" – Ken Hirai
50. "One Night Carnival" – Kishidan

=== Karaoke Revolution J-Pop Best Collection Volume 4 ===
1. "Alone" – B'z
2. "Heiwajima" – B-DASH
3. "Point of No Return" – Chemistry
4. "if..." – Da Pump
5. "Shinjitsu no Uta" – Do As Infinity
6. "Life Goes On" – Dragon Ash
7. "Kioku" – Every Little Thing
8. "However" – Glay
9. "Hello" – Hyde
10. "Garasu no shounen" – Kinki Kids
11. "Solitude ~Shinjitsu no sayonara" – Kinki Kids
12. "Mirai e" – Kiroro
13. "Best Friend" – Kiroro
14. "Anata ni" – Mongol 800
15. "Don't Worry Be Happy" – Mongol 800
16. "Tsukiakari no shita de" – Mongol 800
17. "Any" – Mr. Children
18. "Hello, Again -Mukashi kara aru basho-" – My Little Lover
19. "Orange" – SMAP
20. "Lion Heart" – SMAP
21. "Invoke" – T.M. Revolution
22. "Aozora" – The Blue Hearts
23. "Hito ni yasashiku" – The Blue Hearts
24. "Road" – The Toraburyu
25. "ding-dong" – TOKIO
26. "Natsumatsuri" – Whiteberry
27. "Amairo no kami no otome" – The Village Singers
28. "Mugibatake" – Oyones
29. "Manatsu no kajitsu" – Southern All Stars
30. "Robinson" – Spitz
31. "Saga-ken" – Hanawa
32. "Saudade" – Porno Graffitti
33. "Agehachou" – Porno Graffiti
34. "Morai naki" – Hitoto Yo
35. "Sakura Drops" – Hikaru Utada
36. "Naminori Johnny" – Kuwata Keisuke
37. "Shiroi koibitotachi" – Kuwata Keisuke
38. "Be Alive" – Koyanagi Yuki
39. "Momoiro kataomoi" – Matsuura Aya
40. "The Bigaku" – Matsuura Aya
41. "Hana" – Ishimine Satoko
42. "Kanpai" – Nagabuchi Tsuyoshi
43. "Amairo no kami no otome" – Shimatani Hitomi
44. "Genki o dashite" – Shimatani Hitomi
45. "Ai ga umareta hi" – Fujitani Miwako & Ōuchi Yoshiaki
46. "Dearest" – Ayumi Hamasaki
47. "Mou hitotsu no doyoubi" – Hamada Shougo
48. "Kimi ga iru dake de" – Komekome Club
49. "Roman hikou" – Komekome Club
50. "Lonely Chaplin" – Suzuki Kiyomi with Rats & Star

=== Karaoke Revolution Love & Ballad ===
1. "Mirai yosouzu II" – Dreams Come True
2. "Thank You" – Dreams Come True
3. "Love Love Love" – Dreams Come True
4. "However" – Glay
5. "Mou kimi igai aisenai" – Kinki Kids
6. "Nagai aida" – Kiroro
7. "These Days" – Love Psychedelico
8. "Everything" – Misia
9. "Hana / tori / kaze / tsuki" – Misia
10. "Over" – Mr. Children
11. "Owarinaki tabi" – Mr. Children
12. "Yasashii uta" – Mr. Children
13. "Dareka no kimochi o kangaeta koto ga arimasu ka?" – Siam Shade
14. "Lion Heart" – SMAP
15. "My Graduation" – Speed
16. "Hanashitaku wa nai" – T-BOLAN
17. "Linda" – Ann Lewis
18. "Sayonara" – Off Course
19. "Bye Bye My Love" – Southern All Stars
20. "Kaede" – Spitz
21. "Say Yes" – Chage and Aska
22. "Saudade" – Porno Graffitti
23. "Love Machine" – Morning Musume
24. "Dekkai uchuu ni ai ga aru" – Morning Musume
25. "Can You Celebrate" – Amuro Namie
26. "Kanashimi wa tomaranai" – Anri
27. "Tomorrow" – Okamoto Mayo
28. "Suki ni natte, yokatta" – Kato Izumi
29. "Sayonara daisuki na hito" – Hana*bana
30. "La La La Love Song" – Toshinobu Kubota with Naomi Campbell
31. "for you..." – Takahashi Mariko
32. "Cosmos" – Yamaguchi Momoe
33. "Ii hi tabidachi" – Yamaguchi Momoe
34. "Get Along Together" – Yamane Yasuhiro
35. "Love Story wa totsuzen ni" – Oda Yasumasa
36. "Hello, my friend" – Matsutoya Yumi
37. "Watashi ga oba-san ni nattemo" – Moritaka Chisato
38. "Wakaremashou watashi kara kiemashou anata kara" – Oguro Maki
39. "Genki dashite" – Oguro Maki
40. "Aitai" – Sawada Chikako
41. "Genki o dashite" – Takeuchi Mariya
42. "You're My Only Shinin' Star" – Nakayama Miho
43. "Sekaichuu no dare yori kitto" – Nakayama Miho & Wands
44. "True Love" – Fujii Fumiya
45. "I Love You" – Ozaki Yutaka
46. "Dearest" – Ayumi Hamasaki
47. "Seasons" – Ayumi Hamasaki
48. "End Roll" – Ayumi Hamasaki
49. "Far Away" – Ayumi Hamasaki
50. "Kanashimi wa yuki no you ni" – Hamada Shougo

=== Karaoke Revolution Night Selection 2003 ===
Unlike most variations of Karaoke Revolution which offer modern and classic pop songs, the Night Selection 2003 focuses primarily on traditional genres such as enka.

1. "Hana no yukimushi" – Kim Yonja
2. "Tokyo Twilight" – Cheuni
3. "Tsugunai" – Teresa Teng
4. "Toki no nagare ni mi o makase" – Teresa Teng
5. "Wakare no yokan" – Teresa Teng
6. "Aijin" – Teresa Teng
7. "Osaka bojou" – Nagai Miyuki
8. "Aishuu Sanbashi" – Nagai Yuko
9. "Nadeshiko" – Ryo Kamon
10. "Sake yo" – Ikuzo Yoshi
11. "Yukiguni" – Ikuzo Yoshi
12. "Konya wa hanasanai" – Hashi Yukio & Abe Ritsuko
13. "Awayuki no hashi" – Kagami Gorou
14. "Tsugaru no hana" – Harada Yuri
15. "Nagaragawa enka" – Itsuki Hiroshi
16. "Izakaya" – Itsuki Hiroshi & Kinomi Nana
17. "Haguresou" – Kouzai Kaori
18. "Amerikabashi" – Yamakawa Yutaka
19. "Hana mo arashi mo" – Yamamoto Joji
20. "Tojinbo" – Mizumori Kaori
21. "Aman" – Sugawara Yoichi & Silvia
22. "Hagure Kokiriko" – Naruse Shohei
23. "Koi no machi Sapporo" – Ishihara Yujiro
24. "Yogiri yo konya mo arigatou" – Ishihara Yujiro
25. "Kita no tabibito" – Ishihara Yujiro
26. "Amagigoe" – Ishikawa Sayuri
27. "Tsugaru ga ikyou / Fuyugeshiki" – Ishikawa Sayuri
28. "Kibune no yado" – Kawanaka Miyuki
29. "Nirinsou" – Kawanaka Miyuki & Gen Tetsuya
30. "Shinanogawa" – Takigawa Maiko
31. "Kokoro no eki" – Otsuki Miyako
32. "Sazanka no yado" – Okawa Eisaku
33. "Mago" – Oizumi Itsuro
34. "Kawachi otoko bushi" – Nakamura Mitsuko
35. "Kyoudai-bune" – Toba Ichiro
36. "Chindo monogatari" – Tendo Yoshimi
37. "Haru ga kita" – Tendo Yoshimi
38. "Anta no hanamichi" – Tendo Yoshimi
39. "Futari no Osaka" – Miyako Harumi & Miyazaki Masashi
40. "Kawa no nagare no yō ni" – Misora Hibari
41. "Midaregami" – Misora Hibari
42. "Kiyoshi no zundokobushi" – Hikawa Kiyoshi
43. "Hoshizora no Akiko" – Hikawa Kiyoshi
44. "Kita kuukou" – Hama Keisuke & Kye Eun-Sook
45. "Sotto oyasumi" – Fuse Akira
46. "Tomari ki no machi" – Hattori Yukiko
47. "Hashi" – Kitajima Saburo
48. "Kita no sakaba" – Kitajima Saburo
49. "Nora" – Kadokura Yuki
50. "Okuhida bojo" – Ryu Tetsuya

=== Karaoke Revolution Anime Song Selection ===
Another variation on the franchise's theme is the, which, contrary to its name, often includes themes for tokusatsu shows such as Ninpuu Sentai Hurricanger and several Kamen Rider series. This selection predominantly features shows from the 1970s and 1980s, with a few exceptions in the opening tracks.

1. "Odoru ponpokorin" – B.B. Queens – from Chibi Maruko-chan
2. "Moonlight densetsu" – DALI – from Sailor Moon
3. "Dance! Ojamajo" – MAHO-dou – from Ojamajo Doremi
4. "Pegasus Fantasy" – MAKE-UP – from Saint Seiya
5. "1/3 no junjou na kanjou" – Siam Shade – from Rurouni Kenshin
6. "Invoke" – T.M. Revolution – from Mobile Suit Gundam SEED
7. "Tensai Bakabon" – Idol Four – from Tensai Bakabon
8. "Mahoutsukai Sally" – Hiroko Asakawa – from Sally, the Witch
9. "Hajimete no chuu" – Anshin Baba – from Kiteretsu Daihyakka
10. "Cat's Eye" – Anri – from Cat's Eye
11. "Dokonjogaeru" – Susumu Ishikawa & Arakawa Boys and Girls Choir – from Dokonjo Gaeru
12. "Obake no Q-Tarō" – Susumu Ishikawa – from Obake no Q-Tarō
13. "Kamen Rider Agito" – Shinichi Ishihara – from Kamen Rider Agito (live-action)
14. "Kimi o nosete" – Azumi Inoue – from Castle in the Sky
15. "Tonari no Totoro" – Azumi Inoue – from My Neighbor Totoro
16. "Sazae-san" – Yuko Uno – from Sazae-san
17. "Cha-La Head-Cha-La" – Hironobu Kageyama – from Dragon Ball Z
18. "8 Man no uta" – Shigeru Katsumi – from 8 Man
19. "Ge Ge Ge no Kitaro" – Ichiro Kumakura – from GeGeGe no Kitaro
20. "Ai o torimodose!!" (also known as "YOU wa SHOCK!") – Crystal King – from Fist of the North Star
21. "Ginga tetsudou 999" – Godaigo – from Galaxy Express 999
22. "Attack No. 1" – Kurumi Kobato & Kumiko Osugi – from Attack No. 1
23. "Uchuu senkan Yamato" – Isao Sasaki & Royal Knights – from Space Battleship Yamato
24. "Tatakae! Casshan" – Isao Sasaki – from Casshern
25. "Ginga tetsudou 999" – Isao Sasaki & Suginami Children's Choir – from Galaxy Express 999
26. "Itoshisa to setsunasa to kokoro tsuyosa to" – Ryoko Shinohara with t.komuro – from Street Fighter II: The Animated Movie
27. "Gatchaman no uta" – Masato Shimon – from Science Ninja Team Gatchaman
28. "Hurricanger sanjou!" – Hideaki Takatori – from Ninpuu Sentai Hurricanger (live-action)
29. "Makafushigi Adventure" – Hiroki Takahashi – from Dragon Ball
30. "Kamen Rider Kuuga" – Masayuki Tanaka – from Kamen Rider Kuuga (live-action)
31. "Lupin sansei sono 2" – Charlie Kosei – from Lupin III
32. "Yume o shinjite" – Hideaki Tokunaga – from Dragon Quest: Dai no Daibouken
33. "Devilman no uta" – Keizo Tsujita & Vocal Shop – from Devilman
34. "Anpanman no March" – Dreaming – from Soreike! Anpanman
35. "Yuukirinrin" – Dreaming – from Soreike! Anpanman
36. "Anpanman Taisou" – Dreaming – from Soreike! Anpanman
37. "Minashigo no Ballad" – Hiroshi Nitta – from Tiger Mask
38. "Hamtaro tottoko uta" – Ham-chans – from Hamtaro
39. "Te o tsunagou" – Ham-chans – from Hamtaro
40. "Umi no Triton" – Hide Yuki & Suginami Children's Choir – from Umi no Triton
41. "Candy Candy" – Mitsuko Horie – from Candy Candy
42. "Cutey Honey" – Yoko Maekawa – from Cutey Honey
43. "Hyokkori hyoutanjima" – Yoko Maekawa – from Cutey Honey
44. "Yasashisa ni tsutsumareta nara" – Yumi Arai – from Kiki's Delivery Service
45. "Mazinger Z" – Ichiro Mizuki – from Mazinger Z
46. "Babel nisei" – Ichiro Mizuki & Columbia Cradle Club – from Babel II
47. "Bokura no Mazinger Z" – Ichiro Mizuki & Columbia Cradle Club – from Mazinger Z
48. "Ultra Seven no uta" – Misuzu Children's Choir & The Echoes – from Ultra Seven (live-action)
49. "Tatakae! Kamen Rider V3" – Hiroshi Miyauchi & The Swingers – from Kamen Rider V3 (live-action)
50. "Mononoke Hime" – Yoshikazu Mera – from Princess Mononoke
