= Aya Matsuura Best 1 =

Matsuura Aya Best 1 (松浦亜弥ベスト１)

Greatest hits album by Aya Matsuura
- Released: March 24, 2005
- Genre: Japanese Pop
- Label: zetima
- Producer: Tsunku, Yasuharu Konishi

Aya Matsuura chronology
X3 (2004)	Matsuura Aya Best 1 (松浦亜弥ベスト１) (2005)	Naked Songs (2006)

Matsuura Aya Best 1 (松浦亜弥ベスト１) is Aya Matsuura's 'best of' album. It was released on March 24, 2005, and has sold 110,367 copies. Fans were invited to vote on which songs would appear on the album. 12 out of the 16 tracks are former singles. The album was certified gold by the Recording Industry Association of Japan.

== Track listing ==
1. "Momoiro Kataomoi" (桃色片想い)

- Originally released as a Single in February 2002 and as part of her album, T.W.O. in 2003.

2. "Yeah! Meccha Holiday" (Yeah！めっちゃホリデイ)

- Originally released as a Single in May 2002 and as part of her album, T.W.O. in 2003.

3. "Love Namidairo" (LOVE涙色)

- Originally released as a Single in September 2001 and as part of her debut album, First Kiss in 2002.

4. "Kiseki no Kaori Dance" (奇跡の香りダンス。)

- In 2004, this was her first single to be released, not included in any albums with the exception of this one.

5. "Ne~e?" (ね～え?)

- Originally Released as a Single in March 2003, and as part of her album, X3 (pronounced officially as Triple, not Ex-Three) in 2004.

6. "100Kai no Kiss" (100回のKISS)

- Originally Released as a Single in November 2001 and as part of First Kiss in 2002.

7. "Dokki Doki! Love Mail" (ドッキドキ！LOVEメール)

- Originally Released as a Single in April 2001 and as part of First Kiss in 2002.

8. "Watarasebashi" (渡良瀬橋)

- This song wasn't originally written for, or by, Aya Matsuura. The Original was written and recorded by Chisato Moritaka in 1993 for her album Lucky 7. Both Matsuura and Moritaka were/are signed to Zetima, which is part of Up-Front Works. Matsuura released her Single version of this song in October 2004. Maki Goto, another Fellow Up-Front Works artist, covered this song as well in 2005.

9. "I know"

- This song was released as the B-Side to "The Bigaku" in 2002.

10. "Egao ni Namida ~THANK YOU! DEAR MY FRIENDS~" (笑顔に涙 ~THANK YOU! DEAR MY FRIENDS~)

- This song was released as part of First Kiss.

11. "Hyacinth" (風信子(ヒヤシンス))

- Like the fourth track of this album, this song was released on its own in 2004.

12. "Good Bye Natsuo" (GOOD BYE 夏男)

- This was released as a single in June 2003, and on the album X3 in 2004.

13. "Tropical Koishiteru" (トロピカ～ル恋して～る)

- Originally released as a Single in June 2001 and as part of her debut album, First Kiss in 2002.

14. "Navi ga Kowareta Oujisama (LOVE CHANCE)" (ナビが壊れた王子様 (LOVE CHANCE))

- Originally released as part of T.W.O

15. "Sōgen no Hito (TSUNKU♂Mix)" (草原の人 (TSUNKU♂Mix))

- The original song was released as a part of T.W.O as well, but this particular remix of this song by Tsunku♂ (who also produced the original version of this song), was made for this Compilation Album.

16. "Kanousei no Michi (2005 Version)" (可能性の道 (2005 Version))

- The Original Version was released in X3 as a Pop Tune, but this version is arranged as a slow, acoustic Ballad.
