= Naked Songs =

Naked Songs may refer to:

- Naked Songs (Al Kooper album), 1973
- Naked Songs – Live and Acoustic, a 1995 album by Rickie Lee Jones
- Naked Songs (Aya Matsuura album), 2006
