= Blue Rain =

Blue Rain may refer to:

- "Blue Rain", the musical, written by Choo, Junghwa, music by Huh, Soohyun, and produced by Choi, Soomyoung & C101 in South Korea.
- Blue Rain, album by Japanese group The Checkers (Japanese band)
- Blue Rain, album by Korean group Fin.K.L
- "Blue Rain", song by Glenn Miller and His Orchestra with singer Ray Eberle, Mercer, Van Heusen, 1939
- "Blue Rain", song by The Islanders (American band), Frank Metis, Randy Starr 1959
