= List of best-selling singles in 1994 (Japan) =

This is a list of the best-selling singles in 1994 in Japan, as reported by Oricon.

Ranking	Single	Artist	Release	Sales
1	"Innocent World"	Mr. Children	June 1, 1994	1,813,000
2	"Romance no Kamisama"	Kohmi Hirose	December 1, 1993	1,749,000
3	"Itoshisa to Setsunasa to Kokoro Zuyosa to"	Ryōko Shinohara with t.komuro	July 21, 1994	1,623,000
4	"Don't Leave Me"	B'z	February 9, 1994	1,444,000
5	"Sora to Kimi no Aida ni"	Miyuki Nakajima	May 14, 1994	1,416,000
6	"Hello,My Friend"	Yumi Matsutoya	July 27, 1994	1,357,000
7	"survival dAnce (no no cry more)"	TRF	May 25, 1994	1,354,000
8	"Anata dake Mitsumeteru"	Maki Ohguro	December 10, 1993	1,236,000
9	"Boy Meets Girl"	TRF	June 22, 1994	1,222,000
10	"Sekai ga Owaru made wa..."	Wands	June 8, 1994	1,221,000
11	"True Love"	Fumiya Fujii	November 10, 1993	1,213,000
12	"It's Only Love"	Masaharu Fukuyama	March 24, 1994	1,175,000
13	"Ai ga Umareta Hi"	Miwako Fujitani, Yoshiaki Ōuchi	February 21, 1994	1,142,000
14	"Heart"	Chage and Aska	August 3, 1994	1,142,000
15	"Cross Road"	Mr. Children	November 10, 1993	1,132,000
16	"Oh My Little Girl"	Yutaka Ozaki	January 21, 1994	1,077,000
17	"Tada Nakitaku Naru no"	Miho Nakayama	February 9, 1994	1,048,000
18	"Hitomi Sorasanaide"	Deen	June 22, 1994	1,037,000
19	"Winter Song"	Dreams Come True	January 7, 1994	986,000
