= Kiseki no Kaori Dance =

"Kiseki no Kaori Dance."

Single by Aya Matsuura

from the album Matsuura Aya Best 1
- Released: January 28, 2004
- Recorded: 2004
- Genre: Japanese Pop
- Length: 13:20
- Label: Zetima
- Songwriter(s): Tsunku
- Producer(s): Tsunku, Yasuharu Konishi

Aya Matsuura singles chronology
"The Last Night" (2003)	"Kiseki no Kaori Dance." (2004)	"Hyacinth" (2004)

"Kiseki no Kaori Dance." (奇跡の香りダンス。, Kiseki no Kaori Dansu., "Miraculous Fragrance Dance.") is the 12th single from Aya Matsuura, who was a Hello! Project solo artist at the time. It was released on January 28, 2004 under the Zetima label.

== Track listings ==
=== CD ===
1. "Kiseki no Kaori Dance" (奇跡の香りダンス。, Miraculous Fragrance Dance.) – 4:26
2. "uchuu de la ta ta" (宇宙でLa Ta Ta, La Ta Ta in the Universe) – 4:28 (with Atsuko Inaba)
3. "Kiseki no Kaori Dance." (instrumental) – 4:26
