= Kawa model =

Conceptual model in occupational therapy

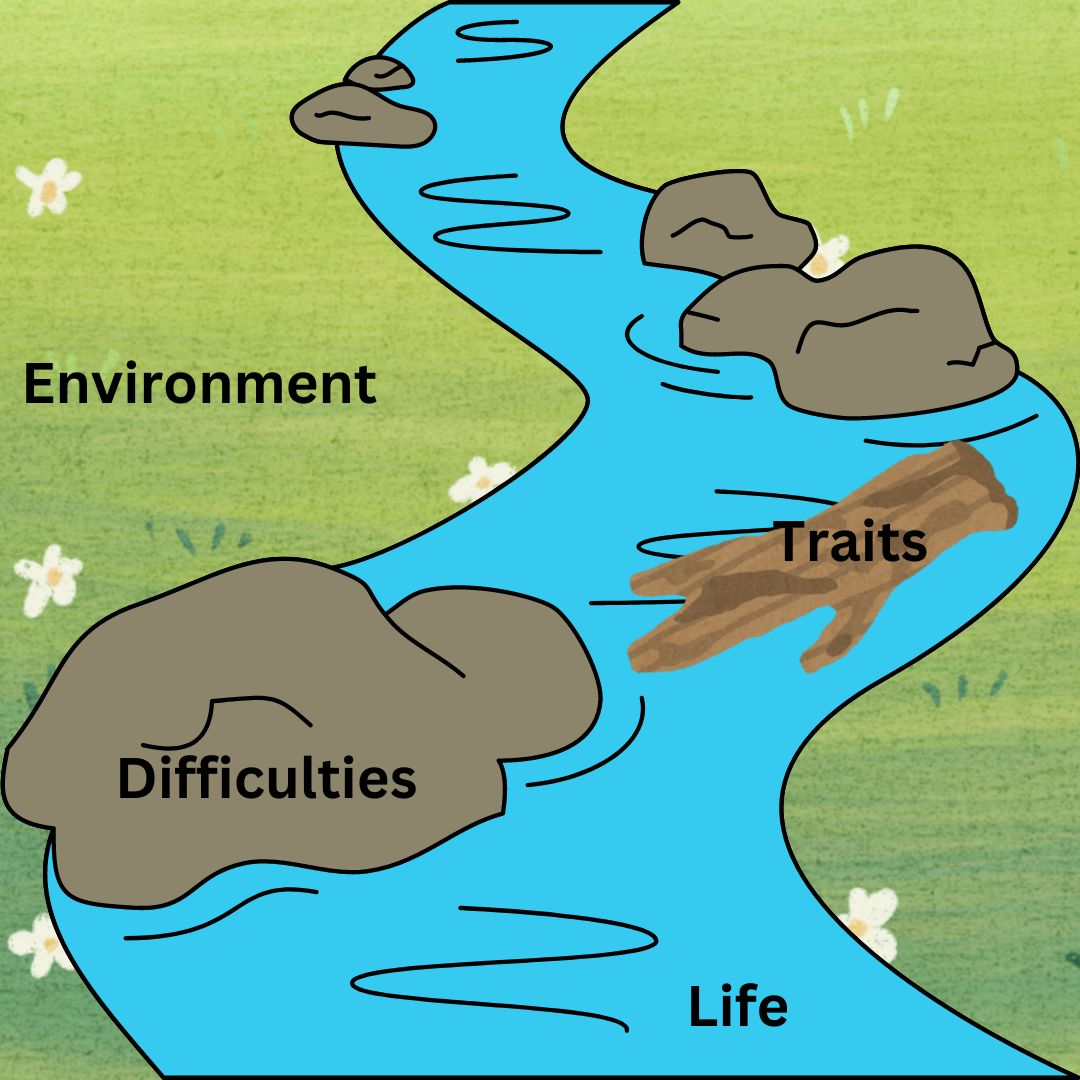
Kawa model illustration

The Kawa model (kawa (かわ)), named after the Japanese word for river, is a culturally responsive conceptual framework used in occupational therapy to understand and guide the therapeutic process. Developed by Japanese occupational therapists (OTs), the model draws upon the metaphor of a river to describe human occupation, which according to OTs refers to individuals' daily activities that make life meaningful. The overarching goal of the model is to "provide a culturally flexible model to aid occupational therapists to improve communication with clients, to better understand what a client finds meaningful and important, and to design optimal client-centered interventions."

The model incorporates five main elements: water, river banks and space, rocks, and driftwood. In the model, "water (mizu) represents life flow and health, driftwood (ryuboku) represents personal assets and liabilities, rocks (iwa) represent life circumstances and problems, and the river walls (torimaki) represent physical and social environmental factors." The model emphasizes that each person's river is unique and influenced by cultural, social, and personal factors.

== History ==
Along with a team of Japanese OTs, Dr. Michael Iwama first developed the Kawa model in 1999. Iwama aimed to develop an occupational therapy model that could be easily understood by clients, not just practitioners and scholars. Coming from a Canadian background, Iwama imagined a model that utilized boxes and squares with arrows between them, but his Japanese colleagues envisioned the river, in part due to the popularity of the song "Kawa no nagare no yō ni" ("Like the Flow of the River") by Hibari Misora, which depicted life as a river. Iwama's colleagues believed the metaphor of the river would resonate more deeply with their clients than Iwama's original idea because of their connection with nature, as well as their collectivistic perspective.

The Kawa model is the first in occupational therapy "developed from clinical practice outside of the Western English-speaking world through qualitative research." Because "Eastern culture emphasizes the harmony between the person and environmental factors, which is believed to enhance health and well-being[,] ... the model focuses heavily on the client's environmental contexts and how that impacts the flow of harmony in life, rather than mainly focusing on the individual client."

In 2006, Iwama published The Kawa Model: Culturally Relevant Occupational Therapy, a textbook that provides an overview of the model. The model is now actively taught in over 500 OT programs and utilized on six continents.

== Core concepts ==
=== Water ===
The concept of "water" represents an individual's life flow and priorities, including their cognition, emotion, physical impairments, occupations, roles, and life experiences. In nature, water often flows from a mountain, which would symbolize a person's birth, and runs into an ocean or other large body of water, which would represent the person's death. Because "water is fluid and ever changing," it reflects the dynamic nature of occupation and the constant interaction between individuals and their environment. Iwama and other proponents of the model suggest that without water flowing and moving, life is stagnant. Further, water is impacted by the structural environment, such as rocks and riverbanks, much like how an individual's "life flow can be shaped, enhanced, or diminished" by physical, social, and other environments. Beyond the water's ability to flow, OTs may ask clients to describe how the river is flowing, such as whether it is choppy or smooth.

According to the model, if the river has a "strong, deep, unimpeded flow," the individual should experience optimal well-being.

=== River banks ===
The concept of "river banks" represents external factors that influence a person's life flow, including social and physical environments and contexts, as well as cultural norms, social expectations, family, and environmental conditions. These factors can support or hinder the person's occupational journey. However, in the most ideal circumstances, "these external elements would support and guide the client through difficult times just as the banks of the river support its flow."

=== Rocks ===
The concept of "rocks" represents obstacles, challenges, and life events that may disrupt or impact a person's occupational well-being. They can include physical or mental health conditions, personal difficulties, or environmental barriers. When visually depicting their life journey, individuals may consider the location and size of rocks, which would indicate when the event occurred, as well as how the individual perceives it. If an individual perceives an event or challenge as being highly impactful and disruptive to their life, the rock would be larger, whereas a smaller rock may represent a less significant challenge.

=== Driftwood ===
The concept of "driftwood" represents personal traits and skills individuals can use to navigate their occupational journey. Driftwood can include personal traits (e.g., being optimistic or determined); personal skill sets and experiences (e.g., being trained in carpentry); specific beliefs, values and principles; and/or material/social capital (e.g., financial wealth or strong social networks). Driftwood can have either a positive or negative impact on the river's flow. It generally flows with the current but may become stuck on a rock and become an impediment; however, it may also unearth rocks to make them less challenging.

=== Spaces ===
The concept of "spaces" represents "opportunities for expanding flow and well-being in accordance with the client's perspective and priorities." Using the metaphor, the overarching goal of occupational therapy is to increase spaces for water to flow through the river. OTs can work with their clients to decrease the size of rocks, widen the river banks, and/or better utilize driftwood. For the former, clients may find ways to eliminate burdens in their life and/or develop strategies to overcome those barriers. To widen the metaphorical river banks, OTs may work with clients to implement universal design methods into their daily lives and/or find other ways to alter the physical environment to make it less of a barrier. Lastly, OTs can work with clients to better utilize existing skill sets and attributes and/or develop new ones to help address barriers. Through these practices, the client's well-being should be positively impacted.

== Use ==
When utilizing the Kawa model, OTs often begin by requesting their clients create a visual representation of their life using the river metaphor. During and after the client's creation, the OT will ask "open-ended, clarifying questions", which allow the OT and client "to explore life's problems, to discuss support systems, and to brainstorm effective methods of problem resolution." This conversation helps ensure the client's drawing accurately portrays how they perceive their life. Importantly, the Kawa model is meant to be used as a flexible guide that can be utilized in multiple ways.

In an interview, Iwama discussed how the model may be used for individuals who may not be able to communicate their life flow for themselves, such as individuals with severe cognitive impairments, young children, or people with dementia. In these cases, Iwama suggested communicating with a group of people close to the individual to collectively discuss the individual's values, barriers, and priorities and thus, as a group, develop their personal Kawa model and collectively problem-solve how to help the individual's river flow.

Some researchers have also suggested using the model for interprofessional discussions regarding clients as a tool to promote team-building collaboration. Importantly, "teambuilding has been positively correlated with job satisfaction, and quality of client care," whereas "a lack of teamwork can lead to decrease morale/job satisfaction, decreased productivity and lost revenue, and decreased client satisfaction and quality of care."

In one study, Lape et al. used the Kawa model within a collaborative care team to facilitate communication about a patient's care needs. Using the model, the care team developed created a Kawa depiction for a client that included perspectives from multiple care providers. Participants in the study found that using the model provided new opportunities for collaboration across the care team; they determined the tool could be effectively used within their profession.

== Strengths ==
Studies utilizing and analyzing the Kawa model have recognized multiple strengths across various domains. The greatest finding across all use cases "was that the Kawa model provides a unique platform for open communication and deeper perspective." Other strengths include its ability to be culturally responsive and client-centered, as well as how it helps develop partnerships and collaboration.

=== Culturally responsive ===
More and more, OTs are recognizing that occupational therapy must be culturally aware and relevant to meet clients' diverse needs. In part, this is because an individual's values, beliefs, ways of thinking and behaving depend upon their cultural backgrounds. Many OTs consider the Kawa model to be culturally responsive. This is, in part, because the model was developed outside the Western world and does not rely upon "Western cultural norms". For example, occupational therapy models often focus on the future, despite some cultures being more focused on the past and present. Additionally, because the model was developed by Japanese OTs, it has a more collectivistic focus than many Western models. In part, this means the model embraces "interdependence within the social environment" and the importance of relationships. Overall, "the tenets of autonomy, self-sufficiency, and individual control, or superiority of the environment, commonly promoted by traditional models of occupation, do not take precedence within the Kawa model."

=== Client-centered approach ===
More and more, OTs aim to keep their clients at the center of occupational therapy work, focusing on the client's perceived needs and priorities rather than focusing on pathologising clients' bodies. In part, this is because "a person's view on what is meaningful to them is unique". That is, instead of deciding upon a set of practices considered universally beneficial, OTs focus on what clients personally find valuable in their life. For example, OTs may spend time helping clients meaningfully participate in hobbies they enjoy (e.g., playing guitar) rather than focusing solely on necessary living tasks (e.g., bathing) and work tasks (e.g., typing on a keyboard). Further, OTs are focusing on how they can teach client's skills, as well as how they can modify environments, to address their perceived needs.

Many OTs find that the Kawa model is highly client-centered, which helps OTs understand the client's perspectives and priorities. In part, this is because the model encourages OTs to discuss with clients what they perceive as barriers, strengths, and opportunities. Clients are also actively involved in goal-setting, centers the clients' values and may increase their motivation to participate in therapy.

=== Partnerships and collaboration ===
Many OTs find that the Kawa model helps develop a therapeutic partnership between the client and the clinician. Because the model is client-centered, it requires discussion between the OT and the client, as well as collaboration between them throughout the process, including discussions regarding the client's values and priorities, goal-setting, and more.

Research has also found that the Kawa model helps facilitate interprofessional collaboration.

== Limitations and criticisms ==
Both OTs and clients can find the conceptual framework difficult to understand. Multiple studies have found that OTs who are new to the Kawa model, as well as those new to occupational therapy, may struggle to use the model with clients. In part, this difficulty may result from an OT's lack of understanding regarding the model's foundational concepts. OTs' difficulty with use may also be due to their preconceptions of the model and metaphor. That is, OTs may have a specific belief about how the model should be used, and when a client has a "unique interpretation", they may find difficulty working with the client. Conversely, clients may struggle with the metaphor and/or be skeptical about its use. Iwama noted that "Westerners looking at the model for the first time may be concerned about where the 'self' is located in the model." This can be seen in some studies in which a participant described the river as "one big wave hitting me over and over again."

The model's ambiguity may also be cause for criticism and impact ease of use. Individual's ability to connect with the metaphor can impact how well clients communicate their occupational needs. Some researchers have also noted that the model doesn't focus on the individual's inner self, that is, the unique and independent part of them that is separate from their surroundings. They also posit that it doesn't pay enough attention to the idea of belonging, which involves being actively involved in a social group and having specific roles and routines. This ambiguity may also result in the OT imposing their own views and biases.

Further, the Kawa model relies upon in-depth discussions with clients. As such, OTs who do not have practice conversing with clients in-depth may struggle to understand their clients' perspectives and needs. However, OTs with proficient interviewing skills may be "more confident in facilitating and guiding the participants to complete their drawings without fear of errors."
