= X3 (album) =

Studio album by Aya Matsuura
- Released: January 1, 2004
- Recorded: 2003
- Genre: Japanese pop
- Label: zetima
- Producer: Tsunku, Yasuharu Konishi

Aya Matsuura chronology
T.W.O (2003)	X3 (2004)	Matsuura Aya Best 1 (2005)

Limited Edition Cover

X3 (pronounced "Triple") is Aya Matsuura's third album. It was released on January 1, 2004, and sold 110,874 copies. It contains three of her previously released singles, as well as a solo version of GET UP! Rapper that she originally sang as part of SALT5 and a remix of Yeah! Meccha Holiday. The album was certified gold by the Recording Industry Association of Japan.

== Track listing ==
1. "Good Bye Natsuo" (GOOD BYE 夏男)
2. "GET UP! Rapper (Matsuura Version)" (GET UP！ラッパー (松浦 Version))
3. "Kanousei no Michi" (可能性の道)
4. "Ne~e?" (ね～え？)
5. "Original Jinsei" (オリジナル人生)
6. "Koishite Gomen ne" (恋してごめんね)
7. "The Last Night"
8. "Watashi to Watashi to Watashi" (私と私と私)
9. "Yeah! Meccha Holiday (HIGH TUNED mix)" (Yeah！めっちゃホリディ(HIGH TUNED mix))
10. "Namida no Wake" (涙のわけ)
11. "LOVE TRAIN"
