= First Kiss (Aya Matsuura album) =

Studio album by Aya Matsuura
- Released: January 1, 2002 (JP)
- Recorded: 2001
- Genre: J-pop
- Length: 48:43
- Label: Zetima
- Producer: Tsunku

Aya Matsuura chronology
| First Kiss (2002) | T.W.O (2003) |

First Kiss (ファーストKiss) is the first album of the J-pop singer Aya Matsuura, a Hello! Project solo artist, containing her first four singles. It was released on January 1, 2002 and sold 293,540 copies. The album was certified gold by the RIAJ.

== Track listing ==
All lyrics are written by Tsunku.

1. Dokki Doki! Love Mail (ドッキドキ！Loveメール) – 4:28
2. Tropical Koishiteru (トロピカ～ル恋して～る, Tropical Loving) – 4:36
3. Oshare! (オシャレ！, Fashion!) – 4:51
4. 100Kai no Kiss (100回のKiss, 100th Kiss) – 4:36
5. Zettai Tokeru Mondai X = ♥ (絶対解ける問題X＝♥, Definitely Solvable Problem X = ♥) – 3:36
6. Egao ni Namida ~Thank You! Dear My Friends~ (笑顔に涙～Thank You! Dear My Friends～, Smiles and Tears ~Thank You! My Dear Friends~) – 4:48
7. Love Namidairo (Love涙色, Love: The Color of Tears) – 4:17
8. Sō Ieba (そう言えば, That Reminds Me) – 4:07
9. S Kun (S君, Boy S) – 4:14
10. Watashi no Sugoi Hōhō (私のすごい方法, My Amazing Technique) – 5:11
11. Hajimete Kuchibiru wo Kasaneta Yoru (初めて唇を重ねた夜, The Night Our Lips First Touched) – 3:59
