= Nee? =

"Ne~e?"

Single by Aya Matsuura
- Released: March 12, 2003 (JP)
- Recorded: 2003
- Genre: J-pop; Akishibu-kei
- Length: 10:49
- Label: Zetima
- Songwriter: Tsunku
- Producers: Tsunku, Yasuharu Konishi

Aya Matsuura singles chronology
"Sōgen no Hito" (2002)	"Ne~e?" (2003)	"Good Bye Natsuo" (2003)

Limited edition cover
- Limited edition CD

Single V cover
- Single V DVD

"Ne~e?" (ね～え？; "Hey?") is the ninth single from Aya Matsuura, who was a Hello! Project solo artist at the time. It was released on March 12, 2003 under the Zetima label. The Single V DVD was released on the same day. It peaked at number 3 on Oricon Singles Chart.

== Track listings ==
=== CD ===
All lyrics are written by Tsunku.

1. "Ne~e?" (ね～え？, Hey?) – 3:31
2. "Onna no Yūjō Mondai" (女の友情物語, Friendship Problems Between Girls) – 3:50
3. "Ne~e?" (Instrumental) – 3:28

=== DVD ===
1. "Ne~e?"
2. "Ne~e?"(Dance Shot Ver.)
3. Making Of (メイキング映像)
