= Meant to Live =

2003 single by Switchfoot

Single by Switchfoot

from the album The Beautiful Letdown
- Released: January 27, 2003
- Genre: Post-grunge
- Length: 3:27
- Label: Columbia; RED Ink
- Songwriters: Jon Foreman; Tim Foreman
- Producer: John Fields

Switchfoot singles chronology
"You Already Take Me There" (2000)	"Meant to Live" (2003)	"More Than Fine" (2003)

Music video
- "Meant to Live" on YouTube

"Meant to Live" is a song by American alternative rock band Switchfoot. It was released to radio on January 27, 2003, as the lead single from their fourth studio album, The Beautiful Letdown (2003). The song peaked at number five on the US Billboard Modern Rock Tracks chart and number 18 on the Billboard Hot 100, becoming the band's first entry to chart and their second-highest charting song. On October 22, 2004, the song was certified gold by the Recording Industry Association of America (RIAA).

"Meant to Live" was also included on the UK version of the soundtrack for the film Spider-Man 2. In 2023, an orchestral version of the song featuring vocals by singer-songwriter Jon Bellion was released under the title "Meant to Live (Jon Bellion Version)" and included on the reissue The Beautiful Letdown (Our Version).

== Background ==
Lyrically, "Meant to Live" was inspired by T. S. Eliot's poem "The Hollow Men". Singer/writer Jon Foreman has said, "Maybe the kid in the song is me, hoping that I'm meant for more than arguments and failed attempts to fly. Something deep inside of me yearns for the beautiful, the true. I want more than what I've been sold; I want to live life." According to Foreman, this song was also inspired by U2's "I Still Haven't Found What I'm Looking For".

This track refers to C.S. Lewis's novel Out of the Silent Planet with the lyric "Maybe we're bent and broken."

It also refers to John Steinbeck's novel Of Mice and Men, in the lyric "Dreaming about Providence and whether mice or men have second tries."

== Composition ==
"Meant to Live" is an alternative rock song that lasts for a duration of three minutes and twenty seconds. According to the sheet music published at Musicnotes.com by Capitol CMG, it is written in the time signature of common time, with a heavy, moderately slow rock tempo of 76 beats per minute. "Meant to Live" is composed in the key of B minor, while Jon Foreman's vocal range spans one octave and three notes, from a low of D_{3} to a high of G♯_{4}.

The song has a incensed post-grunge riff driven by heavy guitars.

== Critical reception ==
Heather Phares of AllMusic wrote that the song "has its cake and eats it too, musically and lyrically speaking ... [its] sympathetic, idealistic (not preachy) viewpoint, combined with its powerful guitars, make[s] the song successful as both an alternative CCM and [a] modern rock single."

== Music videos ==
There were three music videos made for this song. The first video features live performance footage, the second is a concept video depicting the band playing inside a house while the walls and insides are slowly being torn down, showing a resemblance to Nirvana's "Smells Like Teen Spirit" music video, which the "Meant to Live" video has been compared to, and a third video is mixed into clips from Spider-Man 2, and was released exclusively in the UK.

The first two videos featured audio mixed a key higher than the album version.

== Awards ==
In 2005, the song was nominated for a Dove Award for Song of the Year at the 36th GMA Dove Awards.

== Track listing ==
UK CD single

1. "Meant to Live" (album version)
2. "On Fire" (live)
3. "The Beautiful Letdown" (live)
4. "Meant to Live" (video)

== Charts ==
=== Weekly charts ===
Weekly chart performance for "Meant to Live"
Chart (2003–2004)	Peak position
Australia (ARIA)	52
Canada (Nielsen BDS)	15
Canada CHR/Pop Top 30 (Radio & Records)	20
Canada Rock Top 30 (Radio & Records)	1
Netherlands (Single Top 100)	92
Scottish Singles Sales (Official Charts)	29
UK Singles (Official Charts)	29
US Billboard Hot 100	18
US Adult Pop Airplay (Billboard)	5
US Alternative Airplay (Billboard)	5
US Mainstream Rock (Billboard)	37
US Pop Airplay (Billboard)	6

=== Year-end charts ===
2003 year-end chart performance for "Meant to Live"
Chart (2003)	Position
US Modern Rock Tracks (Billboard)	53

2004 year-end chart performance for "Meant to Live"
Chart (2004)	Position
US Billboard Hot 100	51
US Adult Top 40 (Billboard)	21
US Mainstream Top 40 (Billboard)	18
US Modern Rock Tracks (Billboard)	29

== Certifications ==
Certifications and sales for "Meant to Live"
Region	Certification	Certified units/sales
United States (RIAA)	Gold	500,000^{^}
^{^} Shipments figures based on certification alone.

== Release history ==
Release dates and formats for "Meant to Live"
Region	Date	Format(s)	Label(s)	Ref(s).
United States	January 27, 2003	Alternative radio	Columbia; RED Ink	
United States	June 16, 2003	Mainstream rock; active rock radio	Columbia; RED Ink	
United States	February 2, 2004	Hot adult contemporary radio	Columbia; RED Ink	
Denmark	July 12, 2004	CD	Columbia	
Australia	July 26, 2004	CD	Columbia	
United Kingdom	August 2, 2004	CD	Columbia	
