= 100-kai no Kiss =

"100Kai no Kiss"

Single by Aya Matsuura

from the album First Kiss
- Released: November 28, 2001 (JP)
- Recorded: 2001
- Genre: Japanese pop
- Length: 13:10
- Label: Zetima
- Songwriter(s): Tsunku
- Producer(s): Tsunku

Aya Matsuura singles chronology
"Love Namidairo" (2001)	"100Kai no Kiss" (2001)	"Momoiro Kataomoi" (2002)

"100Kai no Kiss" (100回のKISS, Hyakkai no Kiss, "100th Kiss") is the fourth single of the J-pop singer Aya Matsuura, who was a Hello! Project solo artist at the time. It was released on November 28, 2001 under the Zetima label. The song reached a peak of #2 on the weekly Oricon charts, and charted for 7 weeks.

== Track listing ==
1. "100Kai no Kiss" (100回のKiss, "100th Kiss") – 4:37
  - Lyrics and composition: Tsunku / arrangement: Takao Konishi
2. "Merry X'mas for You" – 3:58
  - Lyrics and composition: Tsunku / arrangement: Yuichi Takahashi
3. "100Kai no Kiss" (Instrumental) – 4:35
