= Kawa no Nagare no Yō ni =

1989 Song by Hibari Misora

"Kawa no Nagare no yō ni (川の流れのように)"
- Single cover

Single by Hibari Misora
- Language: Japanese
- Released: January 11, 1989
- Genre: Pop
- Length: 4:54
- Label: Nippon Columbia
- Songwriter: Yasushi Akimoto
- Composer: Akira Mitake

Audio
- Kawa no Nagare no yō ni "川の流れのように" on YouTube

"Kawa no Nagare no Yō ni" (川の流れのように; "Like the Flow of the River") is song recorded by Japanese enka singer Hibari Misora, released on January 11, 1989. It was the last single that Misora released as she died soon after its release in June 1989. It was composed by Akira Mitake, with lyrics by Yasushi Akimoto. The song became her last work before she died on June 21 the same year at the age of 52, and is regarded as her most famous single.

Regarded as one of the most influential songs in Japan, "Kawa no Nagare no Yō ni" was voted the greatest Japanese song of all time during a national poll in 1997 by NHK, with more than 10 million votes.

Misora compared the song to her own life, like "a single drop of rain that travels down the roots of a tree, and a babbling brook becomes a stream. The flow of water hits here and there, but it gradually grows bigger. Eventually it becomes a great river and slowly reaches the sea." With that stated, she personally requested this song to be released as a single in place of the initially planned Ha Ha Ha (ハハハ), even though she usually respected the opinions of the staff. She pleaded to them, saying "Please, let me decide on this one!" (お願いだから、これだけは私に決めさせて!)

== Reception ==
The single charted at 8th place for more than a year and sold 225,000 copies in Japan. It is often the song of choice for artists performing live tributes to Misora.

== Legacy ==
"Kawa no Nagare no Yō ni" inspired the Kawa model used in occupational therapy. In 2023, the Korea Federation of Copyright Societies inducted the song into the Korea World Music Culture Hall of Fame.

In May 2026, 36 years after the initial release of the song, Kawa no Nagare no Yō ni was awarded the Silver Award for the second-highest earned royalties during the musical year 2025 at the JASRAC Awards. According to Japanese newspaper Yomiuri Shimbun, the song garnered new success after being used in a Suntory advertisement.

=== Covers ===
It is also covered by various singers, including Teresa Teng, The Three Tenors, Masami Okui and Mariachi Vargas de Tecalitlán.

== Charts ==
=== Weekly charts ===
Chart (1989)	Peak position
Japan Singles (Oricon)	8

=== Year-end charts ===
Chart (1989)	Position
Japan Singles (Oricon)	35

Chart (1990)	Position
Japan Singles (Oricon)	78

== Literature ==
- Tomonori Shiba (2021), 平成のヒット曲 ((Heisei no hitto-kyoku, „Heisei-Hits“)), 新潮新書 Shinchō shinsho, 929 (in Japanese), Shinjuku: Shinchōsha, 18–26, ISBN 978-4-10-610929-4
