= True Love (Fumiya Fujii song) =

Single by Fumiya Fujii

from the album Angel
- Released: November 10, 1993
- Label: Pony Canyon
- Composer: Fumiya Fujii
- Lyricist: Fumiya Fujii

Fumiya Fujii singles chronology
""Mother's Touch"" (1988)	"True Love" (1993)	"女神 (エロス)" (1994)

Music video
- "True Love" on YouTube

"True Love" (styled "TRUE LOVE") is a single by Japanese recording artist Fumiya Fujii. It was released on November 10, 1993. It was number-one on the Oricon Weekly Singles Chart. It was the 29th best-selling single in Japan in 1993, with 806,000 copies sold, the 11th best-selling single in Japan in 1994, with 1.213 million copies sold and it is the 20th best-selling physical single in Japan, having sold a total of 2.023 million copies.

The song was used as the theme for the Japanese television series, Ordinary People, starring SMAP member Takuya Kimura. The original Japanese name of the drama is Asunaro Hakusho.

== Track listing ==
No.	Title	Length
1.	"True Love"
2.	"Eien ni Shinumade (永遠に死ぬまで)"
3.	"True Love"

== Weekly charts ==
Chart (1993)	Peak position
Japan Singles Chart (Oricon)	1
