= The Checkers (Japanese band) =

Japanese band

- Origin: Kurume, Japan
- Genres: Rock and roll, rockabilly, pop rock, doo-wop
- Years active: 1981 – 1992
- Label: Pony Canyon
- Past members: Fumiya Fujii (vocals, chorus); Masaharu Tsuruku (vocals, chorus); Yoshihiko Takamoku (vocals, chorus); Tohru Takeuchi (guitars, chorus); Yuji Ohdoi (bass, contrabass, chorus); Yoshiya Tokunaga (drums, percussion, chorus); Naoyuki Fujii (sax, flute, back-vocals, chorus)

YouTube information
- Channel: チェッカーズ公式YouTubeチャンネル
- Years active: 2021 -
- Subscribers: 116 thousand
- Views: 77 million
- Last updated: April 3, 2026

The Checkers (Japanese: チェッカーズ) was a Japanese rock band formed in 1981. They were a pop icon of their time as kids copied hair styles and fashion of the band members.

The band was formed in Kurume-city, Fukuoka Pref. by Toru Takeuchi, the leader and the guitarist, who asked Fumiya Fujii to start a band with him in 1980. They won the Yamaha Light Music Contest in Junior category soon after forming the band. Due to some of the members being high school students at the time they were approached with a record deal they waited until those members finished high school. They made a debut on 21 September 1983 and split up on 31 December 1992. All of their single releases entered top 10 in Japanese charts, many of them making it to No 1. Fumiya Fujii, who was the lead singer and the main lyricist, went on to pursue a successful solo career.

Although it was a band that, along with Hiroaki Serizawa, produced their own songs, they were frequently regarded as just male aidoru by Japanese rock fans because of their early marketing promotion.

== Members ==
=== Past members ===
- Fumiya Fujii - vocals, chorus (1962-)
- Naoyuki Fujii - sax, flute, back-vocals, chorus (1964-)
- Masaharu Tsuruku - vocals, chorus (1964-)
- Yoshihiko Takamoku - vocals, chorus (1962-)
- Tohru Takeuchi - guitars, chorus (1962-)
- Yuji Ohdoi - bass, contrabass, chorus (1962-)
- Yoshiya Tokunaga - drums, percussion, chorus (1962-2004; his death)

== Discography ==
=== Singles ===
List of singles, with selected chart positions
Year	Single	Peak chart positions	Format	Label
Year	Single	JPN Oricon	Format	Label
1983	"Gizagiza Heart no Komoriuta" (ギザギザハートの子守唄)	8	CD, LP, Cassette, digital download, streaming	Canyon Record
1984	"Namida no Request" (涙のリクエスト)	2	CD, LP, Cassette, digital download, streaming	Canyon Record
1984	"Kanashikute Jealousy" (哀しくてジェラシー)	1	CD, LP, Cassette, digital download, streaming,	Canyon Record
1984	"Hoshikuzu no Stage" (星屑のステージ)	1	CD, LP, Cassette, digital download, streaming	Canyon Record
1984	"Julia ni Heartbreak" (ジュリアに傷心)	1	CD, LP, Cassette, digital download, streaming	Canyon Record
1985	"Ano Ko to Scandal" (あの娘とスキャンダル)	1	CD, LP, Cassette, digital download, streaming	Canyon Record
1985	"Oretachi no Rockabilly Night" (俺たちのロカビリーナイト)	1	CD, LP, Cassette, digital download	Canyon Record
1985	"Heart of Rainbow: Ai no Niji o Watatte/Blue Pacific" (Heart of Rainbow～愛の虹を渡って～/ブルー・パシフィック)	1	CD, LP, Cassette, digital download, streaming	Canyon Record
1985	"Kamisama Help!" (神様ヘルプ!)	1	CD, LP, Cassette, digital download, streaming	Canyon Record
1986	"Oh!!Popstar"	2	CD, LP, Cassette, digital download, streaming	Canyon Record
1986	"Song for U.S.A."	1	CD, LP, Cassette, digital download, streaming	Canyon Record
1986	"Nana"	-	CD, LP, Cassette, digital download, streaming	Canyon Record
1987	"I Love You, Sayonara"	2	CD, LP, Cassette, digital download, streaming	Canyon Record
1987	"Wanderer"	1	CD, LP, Cassette, digital download, streaming	Canyon Record
1987	"Blue Rain"	2	CD, LP, Cassette, digital download, streaming	Canyon Record
1988	"One Night Gigolo"	3	CD, LP, Cassette, digital download, streaming	Canyon Record
1988	""Jim&Jane no Densetsu" (Jim&Janeの伝説)"	4	CD, LP, Cassette, digital download, streaming	Canyon Record
1988	""Sunao ni I'm Sorry" (素直にI'm Sorry)"	2	CD, LP, Cassette, digital download, streaming	Canyon Record
1989	"Room"	3	CD, LP, Cassette, digital download, streaming	Canyon Record
1989	"Cherie"	5	CD, LP, Cassette, digital download, streaming	Canyon Record
1989	"Friends and Dream"	2	CD, LP, Cassette, digital download, streaming	Canyon Record
1990	"Sadame" (運命)	2	CD, LP, Cassette, digital download, streaming	Canyon Record
1990	"Yoake no Breath" (夜明けのブレス)	2	CD, LP, Cassette, digital download, streaming	Canyon Record
1990	"Sayonara o Mō Ichido" (さよならをもう一度)	7	CD, LP, Cassette, digital download, streaming	Canyon Record
1991	"Love '91"	3	CD, LP, Cassette, digital download, streaming	Canyon Record
1991	"Mrs. Mermaid"	4	CD, LP, Cassette, digital download, streaming	Canyon Record
1991	"Furetegoran: Please Touch Your Heart" (ふれてごらん~Please Touch Your Heart~)	4	CD, LP, Cassette, digital download, streaming	Canyon Record
1992	"Konya no Namida wa Saikō" (今夜の涙は最高)	5	CD, LP, Cassette, digital download, streaming	Canyon Record
1992	"Blue Moon Stone"	7	CD, LP, Cassette, digital download, streaming	Canyon Record
1992	"Present For You"	4	CD, LP, Cassette, digital download, streaming	Canyon Record

=== Albums ===
==== Original albums ====
Title	Album details	Peak chart positions
Title	Album details	JPN Oricon
"Zettai Checkers" (絶対チェッカーズ)	Released: 21 July 1984; Label: Cyanon Records; Formats: CD, LP, digital download, streaming	1
"Motto Checkers" (もっと!チェッカーズ)	Released: 5 December 1984; Label: Cyanon Records; Formats: CD, LP, digital download, streaming	1
"Mainichi Checkers" (毎日チェッカーズ)	Released: 21 August 1985; Label: Cyanon Records; Formats: CD, LP, digital download, streaming	1
"Flower"	Released: 20 March 1986; Label: Cyanon Records; Formats: CD, LP, digital download, streaming	1
"Go"	Released: 2 May 1987; Label: Cyanon Records; Formats: CD, LP, digital download, streaming	1
"Screw"	Released: 21 July 1988; Label: Cyanon Records; Formats: CD, LP, digital download, streaming	4
"Seven Heaven"	Released: 19 July 1989; Label: Cyanon Records; Formats: CD, digital download, streaming	1
"Oops!"	Released: 8 August 1990; Label: Cyanon Records; Formats: CD, digital download, streaming	1
"I Have a Dream"	Released: 21 June 1991; Label: Cyanon Records; Formats: CD, digital download, streaming	2
"Blue Moon Stone"	Released: 19 June 1992; Label: Cyanon Records; Formats: CD, digital download, streaming	2

==== Compilation albums ====
Title	Album details	Peak chart positions
Title	Album details	JPN Oricon
"Non-Stop CHECKERS"	Released: 5 September 1986; Label: Cyanon Records; Formats: CD, Cassette tape	-
"BEST The CHECKERS"	Released: 21 July 1987; Label: Cyanon Records; Formats: CD, LP, digital download, streaming	1
"Checkers The BEST"	Released: 15 December 1991; Label: Cyanon Records; Formats: CD, digital download, streaming	11
"The Checkers"	Released: 6 December 1992; Label: Cyanon Records; Formats: CD, digital download, streaming	1
"The OTHER SIDE"	Released: 16 December 1992; Label: Cyanon Records; Formats: CD, digital download, streaming	11
"Early Singles"	Released: 19 August 1994; Label: Cyanon Records; Formats: CD, digital download, streaming	3
"Ballade Selection"	Released: 1 February 1999; Label: Pony Canyon; Formats: CD, digital download, streaming	-
"Ballade Selection II"	Released: 17 March 1999; Label: Pony Canyon; Formats: CD, digital download, streaming	-
"ALL Songs REQUEST"	Released: 5 March 2003; Label: Pony Canyon; Formats: CD, digital download, streaming	-
"COMPLETE The CHECKERS all singles collection"	Released: 17 March 2004; Label: Pony Canyon; Formats: CD, digital download, streaming	-
"COMPLETE The CHECKERS all singles collection reverse"	Released: 14 July 2004; Label: Pony Canyon; Formats: CD, digital download, streaming	-
"All Ballads Request"	Released: 16 March 2005; Label: Pony Canyon; Formats: CD, digital download, streaming	-
"THE CHECKERS SUPER BEST COLLECTION 32"	Released: 16 September 2009; Label: Pony Canyon; Formats: CD, digital download, streaming	-
"THE CHECKERS 30TH ANNIVERSARY BEST～7X30 SINGLES～2"	Released: 19 July 2013; Label: Pony Canyon; Formats: 2CDs	-
"Platinum Best Checkers All Time Collection" (プラチナムベスト チェッカーズ オールタイム・コレクション)	Released: 17 June 2015; Label: Pony Canyon; Formats: 2CDs	-
"Checkers All Singles Special Collection" (チェッカーズ・オールシングルズ・スペシャルコレクション)	Released: 21 February 2018; Label: Pony Canyon; Formats: UHQCD4s	-
"—" denotes releases that did not chart.

==== Live albums ====
Title	Album details	Peak chart positions
Title	Album details	JPN Oricon
"The Checkers Final Last Budokan Live 1992.12.28 " (THE CHECKERS FINAL ラスト武道館ライブ 1992.12.28)	Released: 19 March 1993; Label: Cyanon Records; Formats: CD	-
"—" denotes releases that did not chart.

==== Soundtracks ====
Title	Album details	Peak chart positions
Title	Album details	JPN Oricon
"Checkers in Tan Tan Tanuki Original Soundtrack" (CHECKERS in TAN TAN たぬき)	Released: 27 April 1985; Label: Cyanon Records; Formats: CD, LP, Cassette tape	1
"SONG FOR U.S.A. Original Song Album" (SONG FOR U.S.A. オリジナル・ソング・アルバム)	Released: 21 July 1986; Label: Cyanon Records; Formats: CD, LP, Cassette tape	-
"—" denotes releases that did not chart.

==== Box sets ====
Title	Album details	Peak chart positions
Title	Album details	JPN Oricon
"Checkers 7 Inch Box" (チェッカーズ 7インチBOX)	Released: 3 December 2022; Label: Pony Canyon; Formats: 7LP	-
"Checkers 40th Anniversary Original Album Special CD-Box" (チェッカーズ 40th Anniversary オリジナルアルバム・スペシャルCD-BOX)	Released: 21 September 2023; Label: Pony Canyon; Formats: 11CDs	-
"—" denotes releases that did not chart.

=== Singles ===
List of singles, with selected chart positions
Year	Single	Peak chart positions	Format	Label
Year	Single	JPN Oricon	Format	Label
1987	"Nanatsu no Umi no Chikyūgi" (7つの海の地球儀)	4	CD, LP, Cassette	Canyon Record

=== Albums ===
==== Original albums ====
Title	Album details	Peak chart positions
Title	Album details	JPN Oricon
"Shine Naru George Springhill Band Sama " (親愛なるジョージ・スプリングヒル・バンド様)	Released: 21 December 1985; Label: Cyanon Records; Formats: LP, CD	1
"—" denotes releases that did not chart.

==== Live albums ====
Title	Album details	Peak chart positions
Title	Album details	JPN Oricon
"Not Checkers: Endagasa Ekikangen Live " (NOT CHECKERS-円高差益還元ライブ): Released as Cute Beat Club Band	Released: 21 November 1987; Label: Cyanon Records; Formats: LP	2
"—" denotes releases that did not chart.

== Videography ==
=== Video albums ===
Title	Album details	Peak chart positions
Title	Album details	JPN Oricon
THE CHECKERS CHRONICLE 1988 SCREW TOUR	Released: 18 December 2013; Label: Pony Canyon; Formats: DVD	-
THE CHECKERS CHRONICLE 1987 GO TOUR	Released: 18 December 2013; Label: Pony Canyon; Formats: DVD	-
THE CHECKERS CHRONICLE 1986 FLASH！！ TOUR	Released: 18 December 2013; Label: Pony Canyon; Formats: DVD	-
THE CHECKERS CHRONICLE 1985 II PIRATES TOUR	Released: 18 December 2013; Label: Pony Canyon; Formats: DVD	-
THE CHECKERS CHRONICLE 1985 I Typhoon' TOUR	Released: 18 December 2013; Label: Pony Canyon; Formats: DVD	-
CHECKERS ALL SONGS REQUEST: DVD EDITION	Released: 18 December 2013; Label: Pony Canyon; Formats: DVD	-
THE CHECKERS CHRONICLE 1992 I Blue Moon Stone TOUR I	Released: 8 January 2014; Label: Pony Canyon; Formats: DVD	-
THE CHECKERS CHRONICLE 1991 II I have a Dream TOUR "WHITE PARTY II"	Released: 8 January 2014; Label: Pony Canyon; Formats: DVD	-
THE CHECKERS CHRONICLE 1991 I I have a Dream TOUR "WHITE PARTY I"	Released: 8 January 2014; Label: Pony Canyon; Formats: DVD	-
THE CHECKERS CHRONICLE 1990 OOPS！ TOUR	Released: 8 January 2014; Label: Pony Canyon; Formats: DVD	-
THE CHECKERS CHRONICLE 1989 SEVEN HEAVEN TOUR	Released: 8 January 2014; Label: Pony Canyon; Formats: DVD	-
THE CHECKERS CHRONICLE 1992 VI Rec．	Released: 15 January 2014; Label: Pony Canyon; Formats: DVD, BD	-
THE CHECKERS CHRONICLE 1992 V FINAL TOUR "ACOUSTIC COLLECTION"	Released: 15 January 2014; Label: Pony Canyon; Formats: DVD, BD	-
THE CHECKERS CHRONICLE 1992 IV FINAL TOUR "ACCESS ALL AREA"	Released: 15 January 2014; Label: Pony Canyon; Formats: DVD, BD	-
THE CHECKERS CHRONICLE 1992 III FINAL TOUR	Released: 15 January 2014; Label: Pony Canyon; Formats: DVD, BD	-
THE CHECKERS CHRONICLE 1992 II Blue Moon Stone TOUR II	Released: 15 January 2014; Label: Pony Canyon; Formats: DVD	-
THE CHECKERS BEST HITS LIVE 1985-1992	Released: 19 September 2018; Label: Pony Canyon; Formats: DVD	-
1992 Blue Moon Stone TOUR I&II	Released: 7 June 2023; Label: Pony Canyon; Formats: 2BD	-
Checkers 40th Anniversary FINAL TOUR (Remaster Edition)	Released: 20 December 2023; Label: Pony Canyon; Formats: 2BD	TBA
"—" denotes releases that did not chart.

== See also ==
- Fumiya Fujii
- List of best-selling music artists in Japan
