= Love Namidairo =

Single by Aya Matsuura

from the album First Kiss
- Released: September 5, 2001
- Genre: Synth-pop
- Length: 4:19
- Label: Zetima
- Songwriter(s): Tsunku
- Producer(s): Tsunku

Aya Matsuura singles chronology
"Tropical Koishiteru" (2001)	"Love Namidairo" (2001)	"100-kai no Kiss" (2001)

Audio sample
- "Love Namidairo": file; help

"Love Namidairo" (LOVE涙色, lit. "Love (The Color of Tears)") is a song recorded by Japanese singer Aya Matsuura for her debut studio album, First Kiss. It was released as the album's third single on September 5, 2001, through Zetima.

== Background ==
Matsuura performed "Love Namidairo" on her first appearance on Kōhaku Uta Gassen in 2001 on which she was the first act to perform. "Love Namidairo" was the official song performed by contestants at the Morning Musume. 5th Generation auditions. In 2002, an English-language cover, dubbed "Love Letter", was recorded by British model and singer Louise for the album Cover Morning Musume Hello! Project!. Matsuura also re-recorded the song in 2006 for her album Naked Songs. This album included arrangements with a studio brass section and more acoustic rhythm section.

== Chart performance ==
"Love Namidairo" debuted at number 3 on the Oricon Singles Chart, with 75,000 copies sold in its first week. The single dropped to number 7 on its second week, selling 34,000 copies. It next spent a last week in the top ten, at number 10, logging sales of 23,000 copies. The single charted in the top 100 for nine weeks, selling a reported total of 172,000 units.

== Track listing ==
All tracks are written by Tsunku

No.	Title	Arranger(s)	Length
1.	"Love Namidairo" (LOVE涙色, "Love (The Color of Tears)")	Cher Watanabe	4:19
2.	"Marumaru (Joshi Kōsei no Shuchō)" (○○-女子高生の主張-, "Blank, Blank (Schoolgirl's Assertion)")	Shunsuke Suzuki	4:53
3.	"Love Namidairo" (Instrumental)	Watanabe	4:15
Total length:			13:27

== Charts ==
Chart (2001)	Peak position
Japan Weekly Singles (Oricon)	3
Japan Monthly Singles (Oricon)	12

== Certification and sales ==
Region	Certification	Certified units/sales
Japan (RIAJ)	Gold	200,000^{^}
^{^} Shipments figures based on certification alone.

== Cover versions ==
- You Kikkawa covered the song on her 2012 cover album Vocalist?.
