= Momoiro Kataomoi =

Single by Aya Matsuura

from the album T.W.O
- B-side: "Enkyori no Renai"
- Released: February 6, 2002
- Recorded: 2002
- Genre: J-pop
- Length: 12:21
- Label: Zetima
- Songwriter: Tsunku
- Producer: Tsunku

Aya Matsuura singles chronology
"100Kai no Kiss" (2001)	"Momoiro Kataomoi" (2002)	"Yeah! Meccha Holiday" (2002)

"Momoiro Kataomoi" (♡桃色片想い♡; lit. "Pink One-sided Love") is a song by Aya Matsuura. It was released as her fifth single on February 6, 2002, under the Zetima label.

== Track listing ==
All tracks are written by Tsunku.

No.	Title	Lyrics	Music	Arrangement	Length
1.	"Momoiro no Kataomoi" (♡桃色片想い♡ lit. Pink One-sided Love)	Tsunku	Tsunku	Yuichi Takahashi	4:22
2.	"Enkyori no Renai" (遠距離の恋愛 lit. Long Distance Love)	Tsunku	Tsunku	Kazuhiro Matsuo	3:46
3.	"Momoiro no Kataomoi" (Instrumental)	—	Tsunku	Yuichi Takahashi	4:19
Total length:					12:21

== Reception ==
The song was certified gold by the RIAJ.

== Popular culture ==
- This song is a playable track in the Japanese version of Donkey Konga.
- Ai Fairouz covered the song as the ending theme for 2020 anime If My Favorite Pop Idol Made It to the Budokan, I Would Die.
