= Fumiya Fujii =

Japanese musician

Fumiya Fujii 藤井 フミヤ
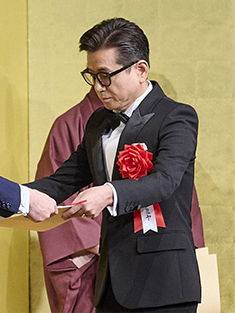

Background information
- Born: Fumiya Fujii (藤井 郁弥); July 11, 1962 (age 64); Kurume, Fukuoka, Japan
- Genres: J-pop, rock
- Occupations: Singer-songwriter, actor, composer, producer, CG artist
- Instruments: Vocals, guitar, harmonica
- Years active: 1983–present
- Labels: Pony Canyon; Sony Music Associated Records; Chaya-zaka Records
- Website: www.fumiyafujii.net

YouTube information
- Channel: 藤井フミヤ Fujii Fumiya
- Years active: 2019-present
- Subscribers: 74.4 thousand
- Views: 36.3 million
- Last updated: January 15, 2024

Fumiya Fujii (藤井 フミヤ, Fujii Fumiya; born July 11, 1962) is a Japanese musician, actor and former lead singer of The Checkers born in Kurume. His younger brother is Naoyuki Fujii, a musician and former sax player for The Checkers. His eldest son is Fuji TV announcer Kōki Fujii. He formerly belonged to Yamaha Music Foundation and Three Star Pro (both during the Checkers era), and now he is part of a private agency, FFM Co.

== Biography ==
Fujii was born as the first child to a father who was a Japanese National Railways employee and a mother who was a beautician. When he was a junior high school student, he encountered the Japanese rock band CAROL and started playing music. After graduating from Nanchiku High School, he joined the Moji Railway Administration Bureau of the Japan National Railways (now Kyushu Railway Company), and after a six-month apprenticeship at Tosu Station, he worked as a freight train operator at Haiki Station, maneuvering and switching freight trains. He belonged to the National Railway Workers' Union (Kokurō).

In 1983, after retiring from the Japanese National Railways, Fujii made his debut as the lead singer of The Checkers and had many hits. Not only his singing ability, but also his appearance and behavior attracted attention, and more and more young people imitated his progressive fashion. He also wrote lyrics for most of the original songs released as singles, and became a central figure in songwriting. In 1992, The Checkers disbanded, and the following year, 1993, Fujii changed the spelling of his first name from kanji to katakana, and started his solo career. Naoyuki Fujii, his younger brother, was also a part of The Checkers and began pursuing a solo career as well. Together they did the project F-Blood in the late 1990s. At the time of the breakup, Fujii was invited to the U.S. by Gota Yashiki, who was living in Los Angeles at the time. Kenji Suzuki, who also lived in Los Angeles, chose him and bought him a Gibson B-25 guitar. The first song he composed using this guitar was "True Love". The song, released the same year, sold 2.4 million copies, and "Another Orion", released in 1996, sold over 1.2 million copies.

Fujii conceptualized the game Baby Universe; Sony Computer Entertainment Japan helped develop the game, which was released for the PlayStation in Japan and Europe by Sony Computer Entertainment in 1997. It is an interactive art video game where the player manipulates the surreal visuals of items like a kaleidoscope with the controller while equally psychedelic music plays in the background. Players can also insert CDs after removing the game disc to listen to music during the simulation in a manner similar to Vib-Ribbon. Fujii co-owns the copyright to the game.

In addition to singing, he has held solo exhibitions under the name "FUMIYART" and produced the Nagoya City Pavilion "Tower of the Earth" for Expo 2005 (recognized by the Guinness Book of Records as the world's largest kaleidoscope). He has also appeared in many TV dramas, and provided the voice of Rock Holmes for the 2003 Astro Boy series, in addition to writing and singing its ending theme "Boy's Heart."

His songwriting credits include "Shiroi Kumo no Youni" (composed by Naoyuki Fujii) for the band Saruganseki and "Hoshizora no Katasumi de" (lyrics and composition) for Misia. He has also produced four songs, including "Heart-Shaped Tears" for Hinano Yoshikawa. His many contributions to the local community include composing the Kurume song "Furusato no Sasayaki" for his hometown Kurume, Fukuoka Prefecture, providing the design for the Kurume Citizen Card, creating the logo for Fukuoka Broadcasting Corporation, and designing the uniform for his alma mater Nanchiku High School. The nickname of Kagoshima City FM, the first community radio station to open in Kagoshima Prefecture on October 1, 1997, "FRIENDS FM 762," was named by Fujii. He has also designed the countdown T-shirts for the 1998 Winter Olympics. The T-shirts were engraved with the number of days remaining until the day of the 1998 games, and Fujii was in charge of designing the shirts from 500 to 401 days before the games.

In 2007, Fujii wrote the lyrics and composed the song "Chinju no Sato" in praise of the 62nd Jingū Shikinen Sengū. It is included in the single "Kimi ni Naru." He stayed in Ise, Mie for three days and composed the song on the riverbank of the Isuzu River near the Uji Bridge.

On December 31, 2008, at a countdown live performance at the Nippon Budokan, Fujii tied with Eikichi Yazawa for first place with 102 performances, including performances during the Checkers era, under the name F-BLOOD, and as a solo artist. In response, he said that he was honored to have stood on the same stage as Yazawa at the Budokan since CAROL (with Yazawa) was the reason why he started his music career.

In November 2019, Fujii opened an official channel on YouTube.

== Discography ==
=== Singles ===
Year	Album	Chart positions (JP)	Label
1993	"True Love"	1	Pony Canyon
1994	"Eros"	3	Pony Canyon
1994	"Angel"	15	Pony Canyon
1994	"Days"	5	Pony Canyon
1995	"Time Machine"	4	Pony Canyon
1995	"Heart Break"	9	Pony Canyon
1995	"Get Up Boy"	17	Pony Canyon
1996	"Girl Friend"	7	Pony Canyon
1996	"Another Orion"	1	Pony Canyon
1996	"Snow Crystal"	16	Pony Canyon
1997	"Do Not"	7	Pony Canyon
1997	"Go the Distance"	15	Pony Canyon
1998	""Dog of Straw" (わらの犬, Wara no Inu)"	8	Sony Music
1999	""Age of Wind" (風の時代, Kaze no Jidai) "	13	Sony Music
1999	"Moonlight Magic"	11	Sony Music
2000	"Stay with me"	20	Sony Music
2000	"Inside"	10	Sony Music
2001	"Upside Down"	18	Sony Music
2001	"Please Let There Be Good Weather Tomorrow" (明日天気にしておくれ, Ashita Tenki ni Shiteokure)	22	Sony Music
2001	"All this love"	18	Sony Music
2002	"Seven Wonders"	14	Sony Music
2003	"Boy's Heart"	12	Sony Music
2004	"Thrill up"	22	Sony Music
2004	"Blowing to Wind of Sunbeam" (木漏れ日の風に吹かれ, Komorebi no Kaze ni Fukare)	9	Sony Music
2005	"To Sky of Victory" (勝利の空へ, Shōri no Sora e)	33	Sony Music
2005	"The Night When You Think Me" (君が僕を想う夜, Kimi ga Boku o Omou Yoru)	12	Sony Music
2006	"Under Harajuku Above Shimokita" (下北以上 原宿未満, Shimokita Ijō Harajuku Miman)	23	Sony Music
2007	"Kimi ni naru" (君になる)	13	Sony Music
2010	"Ima, Kimi ni Itteokou" (今、君に言っておこう)	14	Sony Music
2013	"Seishun" (青春)	10	Sony Music
2022	"Mizuiro to Sorairo" (水色と空色)	13	independent

==== Digital singles ====
Year	Single	Reference
2010	"Owaranai Christmas Eve"	
2015	"Tomo yo"	
2016	"Miracle Smile"	
2020	"Te no naru Hou he"	

=== Albums ===
==== Studio albums ====
Title	Album details	Peak chart positions
Title	Album details	JPN Oricon
Angel	Released: 6 April 1994; Label: Pony Canyon; Formats: CD, digital download, streaming	1
Rock'en Roll	Released: June 7, 1995; Label: Pony Canyon; Formats: CD, digital download, streaming	2
'Tears	Released: September 20, 1996; Label:[Pony Canyon; Formats: CD, digital download, streaming	2
Pure Red	Released: June 18, 1997; Label: Pony Canyon; Formats: CD, digital download, streaming	3
Soramoyou (ソラモヨウ)	Released: October 1, 1998; Label: Sony Japan; Formats: CD, digital download, streaming	5
2000-1	Released: July 1, 1999; Label: Sony Japan; Formats: CD, digital download, streaming	9
In and Out	Released: July 5, 2000; Label: Sony Japan; Formats: CD, digital download, streaming	7
Club F	Released: June 20, 2001; Label: Sony Japan; Formats: CD, digital download, streaming	11
Equal	Released: June 19, 2002; Label: Sony Japan; Formats: CD, digital download, streaming	8
Right Here Right Now	Released: June 18, 2003; Label: Sony Japan; Formats: CD, digital download, streaming	7
Lady Sister Baby	Released: October 22, 2003; Label: Sony Japan; Formats: CD, digital download, streaming	14
Cloverfield	Released: May 19, 2004; Label: Sony Japan; Formats: CD, digital download, streaming	10
Pop Star	Released: September 29, 2004; Label: Sony Japan; Formats: CD, digital download, streaming	16
Kimyou na Kajitsu (奇妙な果実)	Released: June 29, 2005; Label: Sony Japan; Formats: CD, digital download, streaming	15
With The Rawguns	Released: September 20, 2006; Label: Sony Japan; Formats: CD, digital download, streaming	13
Order Made	Released: June 20, 2007; Label: Sony Japan; Formats: CD, digital download, streaming	8
F's Kitchen	Released: October 8, 2008; Label: Sony Japan; Formats: CD, digital download, streaming	8
F's Cinema	Released: September 30, 2009; Label: Sony Japan; Formats: CD, digital download, streaming	14
Life is beautiful	Released: July 11, 2012; Label: Sony Japan; Formats: CD, digital download, streaming	6
Winter String	Released: October 31, 2012; Label: Sony Japan; Formats: CD, digital download, streaming	8
Otona Rock (大人ロック)	Released: July 13, 2016; Label: Space Shower Music; Formats: CD, digital download, streaming	6
Fujii Rock (フジイロック)	Released: July 10, 2019; Label: Space Shower Music; Formats: CD, digital download, streaming	5
Mizuiro to Sorairo (水色と空色)	Released: November 2, 2022; Label: independent; Formats: CD, digital download, streaming	4

==== Compilation albums ====
Title	Album details	Peak chart positions
Title	Album details	JPN Oricon
Standard	Released: December 16, 1996; Label: Pony Canyon; Formats: CD, digital download, streaming	2
Singles	Released: November 18, 1998; Label: Pony Canyon; Formats: CD, digital download, streaming	7
Fumiya Fujii Anniversary Best "15/25"	Released: May 21, 2008; Label: Sony Music; Formats: CD, digital download, streaming	8
Fumiya Fujii Anniversary Best "25/35"	Released: July 18, 2018; Label: Pony Canyon; Formats: CD, digital download, streaming	8

==== Self-cover albums ====
Title	Album details	Peak chart positions
Title	Album details	JPN Oricon
Re Take	Released: July 31, 2002; Label: Sony Music; Formats: CD, digital download, streaming	6

==== Cover albums ====
Title	Album details	Peak chart positions
Title	Album details	JPN Oricon
My Carol	Released: March 26, 2003; Label: Sony Music; Formats: CD, digital download, streaming	-

==== Remix albums ====
Title	Album details	Peak chart positions
Title	Album details	JPN Oricon
The Party Remix	Released: July 31, 2002; Label: Sony Music; Formats: CD, digital download, streaming	-

==== Live albums ====
Title	Album details	Peak chart positions
Title	Album details	JPN Oricon
Fumiya Fujii Symphonic Concert	Released: September 24, 2014; Label: Sony Music; Formats: CD, digital download, streaming	-

=== Other appearances ===
List of non-studio album or guest appearances that feature Fumiya Fujii
Title	Year	Artist	Album/Single
"Kizetsu suru hood Nayamashii"	1997	V.A	Psyche-Delicious Char Tribute Album
"Rock'n Roll Widow"	2004	V.A	Yamaguchi Momoe Tribute Thank you for...
"Cinderella"	2015	V.A	A tribute to cools
"Yuki no Hana"	2016	V.A	Mika Nakashima Tribute

== Songwriting credits ==
List of songs written or co-written for other artists, showing year released and album name
Title	Year	Artist(s)	Album
"Shiroi Kumo no You ni"	1996	Saru Ganseki	Shiroi Kumo no You ni
"Generation Gap"	1997	V6	Generation Gap
"Heart Kabe no Namida", "Rururu Kataomoi"	1997	Hinano Yoshikawa	Heart Kabe no Namida
"Usagichan Say Goodbye", "Shitteru yo"	1997	Hinano Yoshikawa	Usagichan Say Goodbye
"Tenshi no Yubikiri", "Fun"	1998	Mai Fukuda	Tenshi no Yubikiri
"Pure"	1999	Noriko Sakai	Pure
"Katahou no Tsubasa"	1999	Hitomi Kuroki	Katahou no Tsubasa
"Tsubasa no Sekkeizu"	2000	V6	"HAPPY" Coming Century, 20th Century Forever
"Under the sky"	2003	Issa (Da Pump)	Extension
"Hitomi no Naka no Galaxy"	2004	Arashi	Hitomi no Naka no Galaxy
"Hoshizora no Katasumi de"	2004	Misia	Singer for Singer
"Daydreamer"	2007	Tackey & Tsubasa	Takitsuba Best
"Nobara no Yume"	2007	Tokiko Kato	Chanteuse2 -Nobarano Yume-
"Love Tear Drops"	2007	Takashi Tsukamoto	Jiyuu Honpou
"Yawarakai Jikan"	2007	Daikohara Yuki	Grape Home
"Amatsubu no Birthday"	2012	Sowelu	Best
"Abunai Onna Karinai Otoko"	2015	Tube	Your Tube + My Tube
"Bang On!"	2017	Kishidan	Manyoshu
"Kimi wo Daisuki Da"	2019	Kis-My-Ft2	Kimi wo Daisuki Da
