= Naked Songs (Aya Matsuura album) =

Studio album by Aya Matsuura
- Released: November 29, 2006
- Recorded: 2006
- Genre: J-pop
- Label: zetima
- Producer: Tsunku, Yasuharu Konishi

Aya Matsuura chronology
Matsuura Aya Best 1 (2005)	Naked Songs (2006)	Double Rainbow (2007)

Naked Songs is Aya Matsuura's fourth studio album and her first self-cover album. She also has released a DVD of the Recording Sessions of this album (some of the songs featured on the CD are from the DVD and, on CD, have added a Brass Section and Backing Vocals) It contains some unplugged (hence, "Naked") re-recordings of her older material. It was released on November 29, 2006 and has sold 18,961 copies. The album peaked at number 24 on Oricon Albums Chart.

"Dokki Doki! Love Mail" (ドッキドキ! LOVEメール, Dokki Doki! Love Mēru) was released on April 11, 2001 as debut single by Matsuura, reaching place 10 in the Oricon charts, charting for six weeks, selling 72,070 copies. It was re-recorded in 2006 for Naked Songs, where it included arrangements with a Studio Brass Section and more acoustic rhythm section.

== Track listings (CD) ==
1. "Feel Your Groove"
2. "Rock My Body"
3. "Hitori" (ひとり; "Alone")
4. "Oshare!" (オシャレ！; "Fashion")
5. "I Know"
6. "Hajimete Kuchibiru o Kasaneta Yoru" (初めて唇を重ねた夜; "The Night Our Lips First Touched")
7. "Love Namidairo"
8. "Dokki Doki! Love Mail"
9. "Tropical Koishiteru"
10. "Don't Know Why" (Jesse Harris/Norah Jones Cover)
11. "Suna o Kamu Yō ni... Namida" (砂を噛むように… NAMIDA; "Like Eating Sand... Tears")
12. "Dearest."

== Track listings (DVD) ==
1. "Oshare!" (オシャレ！; "Fashion")*
2. "100kai no Kiss" (100回のKiss; "100th Kiss")
3. "Don't Know Why"
4. "Yeah! Meccha Holiday" (Yeah! めっちゃホリディ; "Yeah! Super Holiday")
5. "Dokki Doki! Love Mail"*
6. "Momoiro Kataomoi" (♡桃色片想い♡; "Peach-Colored Unrequited Love")
7. "Happiness"
8. "Tropical Koishiteru"*
9. "I Know"*
10. "Hajimete Kuchibiru o Kasaneta Yoru" (初めて唇を重ねた夜; "The Night Our Lips First Touched")
- * - Denotes songs that were used in the "Naked Songs" CD and didn't have the Brass Section and Background Vocals included in the CD version.
