= Good Bye Natsuo =

"Good bye Natsuo"

Single by Aya Matsuura

from the album X3
- Released: June 4, 2003
- Recorded: 2003
- Genre: Japanese pop
- Length: 12:13
- Label: Zetima
- Producer(s): Tsunku, Yasuharu Konishi

Aya Matsuura singles chronology
"Nee?" (2003)	"Good bye Natsuo" (2003)	"The Last Night" (2003)

"Good Bye Natsuo" (GOOD BYE 夏男, "Goodbye Summer Boy") is the tenth single by Aya Matsuura, a former Hello! Project solo artist. It was released on June 4, 2003, under the Zetima label. The single peaked at #3 on the Oricon weekly singles charts, charting for eleven weeks.

== Track listing ==
No.	Title	Length
1.	"Good Bye Natsuo" (GOOD BYE 夏男, "Goodbye Summer Boy")	4:18
2.	"Watakushi no Yotei" (私の予定, "My Schedule")	3:37
3.	"Good Bye Natsuo (Instrumental)"	4:18
