= T.W.O =

Studio album by Aya Matsuura
- Released: January 29, 2003
- Recorded: 2002
- Genre: Japanese pop
- Length: 50:49
- Label: Zetima
- Producer: Tsunku

Aya Matsuura chronology
First Kiss (2002)	T.W.O (2003)	X3 (2004)

T.W.O (ティー・ダブリュ・オー "tee double-u o") is the second studio album by the Japanese pop singer Aya Matsuura, released by Zetima on January 29, 2003. The title is somewhat of a pun, functioning both as an acronym for "That Wonderful One", and as a reference to its status as her second album. It achieved platinum for sales of over 250,000 copies. It contains four of her previously released singles as well as a solo version of "SHALL WE LOVE?", which she had originally sung as part of Gomattou.

== Track listing ==
1. Yeah! Meccha Holiday (Yeah!めっちゃホリデイ)
2. The Bigaku (The 美学)
3. Anata no Kanojo (あなたの彼女)
4. Momoiro Kataomoi (桃色片想い)
5. Diary (ダイアリー)
6. SHINE MORE
7. SHALL WE LOVE? (Matsuura Version)
8. From That Sky ~Kaedama wa Katamen de~ (From That Sky～替え玉は硬メンで～)
9. Date Biyori (デート日和)
10. Sōgen no Hito (草原の人)
11. Navi ga Kowareta Oujisama (LOVE CHANCE) (ナビが壊れた王子様 (LOVE CHANCE))
12. Motokare (元彼)
