= Automatic (Hikaru Utada song) =

- The 12cm CD artwork that commercializes both "Automatic" and "Time Will Tell".

Single by Hikaru Utada

from the album First Love
- A-side: "Time Will Tell"
- Released: December 9, 1998
- Recorded: August 1998
- Studio: Studio Z'd, Wonder Station Yoyogi Studio, Studio Terra, Tokyo, Japan
- Genre: R&B
- Length: 5:28
- Label: Toshiba EMI; Eastworld
- Songwriter: Utada
- Producers: Utada; Akira Miyake; Teruzane Utada

Hikaru Utada singles chronology
"Automatic" / "Time Will Tell" (1998)	"Movin' On Without You" (1999)

Alternative cover
- The mini CD that commercializes "Automatic".

Music video
- "Automatic" on YouTube

"Automatic" is a song recorded by Japanese–American singer Hikaru Utada as the lead single from their second studio album First Love (1999). It was released on December 9, 1998, through Toshiba-EMI in three physical formats: mini CD single, standard-size CD single and 12" vinyl. Additionally, the single included the A-side "Time Will Tell", which originally served as the B-side for these versions. The song was written and co-produced by Utada, while Akira Miyake and Teruzane Utada served as producers. Despite recording in English under the name Cubic U, "Automatic" is Utada's first Japanese recording and was released after they (Note: Utada uses they/them and she/her pronouns. This article uses they/them for consistency.) enrolled in high school in Japan.

Musically, "Automatic" is an R&B song that incorporates elements of pop, dance and soul music. Lyrically, it delves into themes of love, and focuses on one of the singer's previous relationships. Upon its release, "Automatic" received positive reviews from music critics, who commended Utada's vocal abilities and production style. It won numerous accolades in Japan, and has subsequently been listed as one of their best releases.

Commercially, "Automatic" and "Time Will Tell" experienced success in Japan. The 8 cm CD single edition reached number four on the Oricon Singles Chart and sold over 772,000 units there. Meanwhile, the 12 cm CD single edition peaked at number two and sold 1.291 million units, tallying over two million copies in Japan; it was certified Million by the Recording Industry Association of Japan (RIAJ) for physical shipments. Since its release, Oricon has ranked it among many best-selling singles in the country, and it has earned other distinctions for its commercial success.

An accompanying music video was directed and produced by Tomu Izawa, featuring Utada performing the song in a small room with a yellow sofa. In order to promote the single, Utada performed it on numerous concert tours, such as their Bohemian Summer 2000 tour, Budokan 2004 concert shows, Utada United, In the Flesh, and Wild Life. Additionally, the song has been included on Utada's compilation albums and made appearances in various commercials in Japan.

== Background and production ==
Born and raised in New York City, Utada had their first solo experience in professional recording under the pseudonym Cubic U, which was used for their earlier English language work. After completing their first record Precious (1998), with the help and guidance of their parents, musicians Teruzane Utada and Keiko Fuji, it failed to generate interest in either the United States or Japan, with the record only appearing at number 38 on the Oricon Albums Chart in the latter country. At the time however, Utada had moved to Tokyo and attended Seisen International School, and later the American School in Japan, subsequently scoring a record contract with label Toshiba-EMI. Executives at the company worked with Utada to become classified as a singer-songwriter instead of an idol singer, and prompted them to write and record songs in Japanese rather than English.

Utada solely wrote "Automatic" in Tokyo, and recorded a demo tape in mid-1998—which then appeared on the special 15th Anniversary edition of their album First Love (1999). They received help from their father and his friend Akira Miyake, who both served as producers on the track. Utada acted as a co-producer and co-composer on the recording, two roles which they felt were necessary to perform in becoming a singer-songwriter. The trio began working on their debut single, and recorded it at three studios: Studio Z'd, Wonder Station Yoyogi Studio, and Studio Terra, all based in Tokyo, Japan. According to Utada, an English version was recorded, but executives at Toshiba-EMI insisted that they promote themselves in the Japanese market, so they recorded the final version in Japanese instead.

== Composition and release ==
Musically, "Automatic" is an R&B song that incorporates elements of pop, dance and soul music. A contributor of Japanese magazine CD Journal noted that the R&B composition was a very "common" trait in Western music in the late 1990s. Kano, writing for Rockin'On Japan, agreed, and felt the song successfully infused contemporary soul and club music. The writer commented that Utada's experimentation with R&B music was significant to Japanese culture, as he felt the country did not emphasize the genre. Additionally, he noticed the contrast of their "painful" yet "innocent" vocal range in the number.

"Automatic" was released as a double A-side with "Time Will Tell", which premiered on December 9, 1998, through Toshiba-EMI in three physical formats: mini CD single, standard-size CD single and 12" vinyl. All three packages feature the two songs, but included a different third track; the mini CD featured an original karaoke of "Automatic", while the vinyl and standard CD single included an English-dub mix of "Time Will Tell". The cover art for the mini CD was a shot from the accompanying music video, which has the singer sitting on a yellow sofa. In the United States, "Automatic" and "Time Will Tell" were added onto a special 12" vinyl that was published for promotional usage, namely through underground clubs. Furthermore, the artwork used for the standard CD single was yet another shot from the clip, this time with Utada standing in the blue room wearing white clothes.

In 2009, a song titled "Automatic Part 2" was included on the singer's second English-language album This Is the One, which samples parts of the English lyrics from the original Japanese song.

== Critical response ==
Since its release, "Automatic" has received positive reviews from music critics. A journalist of CD Journal awarded it a special star recognition, praising Utada's "full of emotions" and vocal abilities. Although they felt that the sound was "generic", they stated that the production was "flexible" and "pleasant", whilst noting their professional abilities at 15 years old. Kano, writing for Rockin'on Japan magazine, examined the single's ability to re-ignite J-pop globally, and praised their vocal performance in the track. In conclusion, he commented; "Everything started from here." While reviewing the greatest hits album Utada Hikaru Single Collection Vol.1 (2004), Hayashi, reporting for OngakuDB.com, was surprised by "Automatic"'s longevity, stating that it seemed as if it had been released "just yesterday". Satoshi Shimada of Yeah!! J-Pop! and Kanako Hayakawa from Shinko Music agreed, and both felt it was one of the strongest hits from the collection.

"Automatic" has been awarded several accolades by music organisations. In 2000, the single was given the gold award for most royalties received from the previous year at the JASRAC awards, beating Utada's own song "Time Will Tell". That same year, it received the Honorable Mention at the Japan Record Awards, and at the Japan Gold Disc Awards, "Automatic" was awarded Song(s) of the Year with their follow-up releases "Movin' on Without You" and "Addicted to You".

== Commercial performance ==
Commercially, "Automatic/Time Will Tell" was a success. The 8cm edition of the single debuted at number 20 on the Oricon Singles Chart with 17,990 copies sold, while the 12cm edition debuted at number 12 with 24,220 copies sold. Weeks later the 12cm edition would peak at number 2, while the 8cm edition peaked at number 4. By the end of 1999, Oricon ranked the 12cm single at 5th place on their year-end chart with 1,290,700 copies sold, while the 8cm edition was ranked at 22nd place with 772,080 copies sold.

Across all individual releases, "Automatic" / "Time Will Tell" has sold 2,062,780 copies, marking it as the second highest-selling single of 1999, just behind "Dango 3 Kyodai" which was a collaborative release between Kentaro Hayami, Ayumi Shigemori, Sunflower Kids, and the Dumpling choir. Furthermore, it is the second highest-selling single by a female artist, only behind Namie Amuro's hit "Can You Celebrate?" which sold 2.750 million copies in Japan. In 2014, in celebration of the singer's 15th anniversary of First Love, "Automatic" entered the Japan Hot 100 and Adult Contemporary chart at number 73 and 53. It was certified million by the Recording Industry Association of Japan (RIAJ) for physical shipments, and gold for 100,000 ringtone cellphone purchases.

== Music video ==
An accompanying music video was directed and produced by Tomu Izawa, and marks Utada's visual debut. The video opens with a small intro screen of Utada and the song's title, and disappears to show Utada sitting and singing on a yellow sofa, in front of a closed garage door. As the chorus begins, they start to dance with various close-up shots of their face. The second verse and chorus showcases Utada in a small blue room lit by a LED light, and superimposed the song's title on various scenes. It ends with the singer's title against their face, as the screen is tinted blue. The clip was included on their 1999 DVD collection Singles Clip Collection Vol. 1, and subsequently on the 15th anniversary edition of First Love, which included all the visuals from the record. The yellow sofa and garage door scene was parodied in Halcali's single "Tandem", and subsequently through Utada's single "Goodbye Happiness" (2010), which they personally directed.

== Promotion and cover versions ==
In order to promote the single, Utada conducted several endorsements with companies throughout Japan. It was featured on the video game Beatmania GB 2 GatchaMIX (1999) for the Game Boy Color. Additionally, "Automatic" has appeared on all of the singer's concert tours; its first appearance was their Bohemian Summer Tour in 2000. The following year, Utada hosted an MTV Unplugged series, in which they performed the number as one of the closing songs; it was also featured on the live album/DVD, and premiered throughout various Japanese music television shows. Three years later, the singer included the track on the set list for their Live in Budokan tour, which was a resident series of concerts at Nippon Budokan, and two years later on Utada United as part of the encore. In 2010, Utada commenced their first international tour in the United Kingdom and United States, titled Utada: In the Flesh 2010. For each date, they performed "Automatic" as an encore number, and also performed it during their December 2010 show Wild Life.

In 1999, Hong Kong singer and actress Kelly Chen covered the song in Mandarin. Ten years later, Jamaican reggae group Sly and Robbie and Unitzz released an English language cover of the song. A second reggae cover was produced in 2011 by DJ Sasa with Island Souls on their album Respect! J-Pop, featuring vocals by Shinobu Nakasone of OrangeClover. Kyoto rock band Unchain released a cover of the song on their cover album Love & Groove Delivery (2013). Swedish band Dirty Loops covered the song on their 2014 album Loopified, and in the same year singer-songwriter Yasuyuki Okamura recorded the song for Utada Hikaru no Uta, a tribute album celebrating 15 years since Utada's debut.

== Track listings and formats ==
Mini CD single

1. "Automatic" – 5:14
2. "Time Will Tell" – 5:30
3. "Automatic" (Original karaoke) – 5:14

CD single

1. "Automatic" – 5:14
2. "Time Will Tell" – 5:30
3. "Time Will Tell" (Dub mix) – 5:36

12" vinyl

1. "Automatic" – 5:14
2. "Time Will Tell" – 5:30
3. "Time Will Tell" (Dub mix) – 5:36

Digital EP

1. "Automatic" – 5:14
2. "Time Will Tell" – 5:30
3. "Time Will Tell" (Dub mix) – 5:36

Untitled 12" vinyl

1. "Movin' on Without You" – 4:40
2. "Movin' on Without You" (Tribal mix) – 4:40
3. "Automatic" – 5:14
4. "Time Will Tell" – 5:30
5. "Time Will Tell" (Dub mix) – 5:36

== Personnel ==
Credits adapted from the CD liner notes of First Love: 15th Anniversary edition.

Musicians and personnel

- Hotoda Goh – mixing
- Kei Kawano – additional arrangement
- Masashi Kudo – recording
- Tsuyoshi Kon – Guitar
- Akira Miyake – production
- Nobuhiko Nakayama – synthesizer programming
- Akira Nishihira – arrangement, keyboards, programming
- Taka & Speedy – rhythm tracks arrangement, programming
- Masaaki Ugajin – recording
- Hikaru Utada – writing, vocals
- Teruzane "Skingg" Utada – production

== Charts ==
=== Weekly charts ===
Chart (1998–1999)	Peak position
Japan Singles (Oricon) (8cm)	4
Japan Singles (Oricon) (12cm)	2
Taiwan Singles (IFPI Taiwan)	3

Chart (2014)	Peak position
Japan (Japan Hot 100)	73
Japan Adult Contemporary (Billboard)	53

Chart (2024)	Peak position
Japan (Japan Hot 100)	80

=== Year-end charts ===
Chart (1998–1999)	Peak position
Japan Singles (Oricon) (8cm)	22
Japan Singles (Oricon) (12cm)	5

=== Decade-end charts ===
Chart (1990–1999)	Position
Japan Singles (Oricon)	12

== Sales and certifications ==
Sales and certifications for "Automatic"
Region	Certification	Certified units/sales
Japan 8cm release	—	772,080
Japan (RIAJ) 12cm release	Million	1,290,700
Japan (RIAJ)	Gold	100,000^{*}
Streaming
Japan (RIAJ)	Platinum	100,000,000^{†}
^{*} Sales figures based on certification alone.^{†} Streaming-only figures based on certification alone.

== Release history ==
Region	Date	Format	Label	Ref.
Japan	December 9, 1998	Mini CD single; CD single; 12" vinyl	Toshiba-EMI	
Japan	December 9, 2014 (Note: "Automatic" was not released individually, but appeared on the remastered versions of Utada Hikaru Single Collection Vol. 1 when it was distributed worldwide.)	Digital download	Universal Music Japan	
Australia	December 9, 2014	Digital download	Universal Music Group	
New Zealand	December 9, 2014	Digital download	Universal Music Group	
United Kingdom	December 9, 2014	Digital download	Universal Music Group	
Ireland	December 9, 2014	Digital download	Universal Music Group	
Germany	December 9, 2014	Digital download	Universal Music Group	
France	December 9, 2014	Digital download	Universal Music Group	
Spain	December 9, 2014	Digital download	Universal Music Group	
Taiwan	December 9, 2014	Digital download	Universal Music Group	
