= Time Will Tell (Hikaru Utada song) =

- The promotional CD cover

Single by Hikaru Utada

from the album First Love
- A-side: "Automatic"
- Released: December 9, 1998
- Recorded: August 1998
- Studio: Studio Z'd, Wonder Station Yoyogi Studio, Studio Terra, Tokyo, Japan
- Genre: R&B
- Length: 5:30
- Label: Toshiba EMI; Eastworld
- Songwriter: Utada
- Producers: Utada; Akira Miyake; Teruzane Utada

Hikaru Utada singles chronology
"Time Will Tell" / "Automatic" (1998)	"Movin' On Without You" (1999)

Alternative cover
- Commercial CD featuring "Automatic" and "Time Will Tell"

"Time Will Tell" (stylized as "Time will tell") is a song recorded by Japanese–American singer Hikaru Utada, taken as the lead single from their second studio album First Love (1999). It was released on December 9, 1998, through Toshiba-EMI in three physical formats: mini CD single, standard CD single and 12" vinyl. Additionally, the single was originally served as a B-side to "Automatic", but was changed into an A-side. The song was written and co-produced by Utada, while Akira Miyake and Teruzane Utada served as producers. Despite working recording in English under the name Cubic U, "Time Will Tell" is Utada's first Japanese recording, and was released after they enrolled into high school in Japan.

Musically, "Time Will Tell" is a dance tune that incorporates elements of pop, jazz and funk music. Lyrically, it delves into themes of love, and focuses on moving on from a relationship. Although an English version was recorded, it was placed as a B-side recording on the re-released CD single. Upon its release, "Time Will Tell" received positive reviews from music critics, who commended Utada's vocal abilities and production style. It was nominated for numerous accolades in Japan, and has subsequently been listed as one of their best releases. Commercially, the 8 cm CD single edition of "Automatic" and "Time Will Tell" experienced success in Japan, reaching number four on the Oricon Singles Chart and selling over 772,000 units there.

Meanwhile, the 12 cm CD single edition peaked at number two and sold 1.291 million units, tallying over two million copies in Japan; it was certified million by the Recording Industry Association of Japan (RIAJ) for physical shipments. Since its release, Oricon has ranked it amongst many best-selling singles in the country, and has earned other distinctions for its commercial success. In order to promote the single, Utada had included it on all their concert tours, such as their Bohemian Summer 2000 tour, Budokan 2004 concert shows, Utada United, In the Flesh and the 2010 Wild Life tour. Additionally, the recording appeared on compilation albums conducted by the artist, and has made appearances on various commercials in Japan.

== Background and production ==
Born and raised in New York City, Utada had their first solo experience in professional recording with Cubic U, a pseudonym used for their earlier English language work. After completing their first record Precious (1998), with the help and guidance of their parents, musicians Teruzane Utada and Keiko Fuji, it failed to generate interest in both the United States and Japan, with the record only appearing at number 38 on the Oricon Albums Chart in the latter country. At the time however, Utada had moved to Tokyo and attended Seisen International School, and later the American School in Japan, subsequently scoring a record contract with label Toshiba-EMI. Executives at the company worked with Utada to become classified as a singer-songwriter instead of an idol singer, and prompted them to write and record songs in Japanese language rather than English.

From the bunch, Utada solely wrote "Time Will Tell" in Tokyo, and recorded a demo tape in mid-1998—which then appeared on the special 15th Anniversary edition of their album First Love (1999). An English language version was recorded, but it appeared as an additional recording on the physical release, titled the "Dub mix". Additionally, the singer acts as a co-producer and co-composer on the recording, two roles which they felt were necessary in becoming a singer-songwriter. They recorded their debut single in June 1998 at Quad Recording Studios in New York City and Studio Terra in Tokyo.

== Composition and release ==
Musically, "Time Will Tell" is a dance tune that incorporates elements of pop, jazz and funk. According to a contributor of Japanese magazine CD Journal, they noticed that the sound was "very mid-tempo" and believed it to be inspired by contemporary American culture. Kano, writing for Rockin'On Japan, felt the song infused contemporary R&B and hip hop elements. The writer commented that their experimentation with R&B music was signfiying to Japanese culture, as he felt the country did not emphasize the genre. Additionally, he noticed their "positive" songwriting.

"Time Will Tell" was released as a double A-side with "Automatic", which premiered on December 9, 1998, through Toshiba-EMI in three physical formats: mini CD single, standard CD single and 12" vinyl. All three packages feature the two song, but included a different third track; the mini CD featured an original karaoke of "Automatic", while the vinyl and standard CD single included an English-dub mix of "Time Will Tell". The cover art for the mini CD was a shot from the accompanying music video, which has the singer sitting on the yellow sofa. In the United States, "Automatic" and "Time Will Tell" were added onto a special 12" vinyl that was published for promotional usage, namely through underground clubs. Furthermore, the artwork for the standard CD single was yet another shot from the clip, this time with Utada standing in the blue room wearing white clothes.

== Critical response ==
Since its release, "Time Will Tell" has received positive reviews from music critics. A journalist of CD Journal awarded it a special star recognition, praising Utada's songwriting and their vocal performance. Additionally, they commended the singer's experimentation of genres. Kano, writing for Rockin'on Japan magazine, examined the single's ability to re-ignite J-pop globally, and praised their vocal performance and sound. While reviewing their greatest hits album Utada Hikaru Single Collection Vol.1 (2004), Satoshi Shimada of Yeah!! J-Pop! and Kanako Hayakawa from Shinko Music both felt it was one of the strongest hits from the collection. "Time Will Tell" has been nominated for the gold award for most royalties received from the previous year at the JASRAC awards, but "Automatic" was the winning recipient. Despite this, it achieved the silver award instead.

== Commercial response ==
Commercially, the mini CD single of "Automatic" / "Time Will Tell" experienced success in Japan. It opened at number four on the Oricon Singles Chart, their first charting experience in that category, and spent a total of 23 weeks. By the end of 1999, Oricon ranked the single at number 22 on their year-end chart, with estimated sales of 772,080, making it the seventh highest entry by a female artist—five of which were claimed by the singer. Meanwhile, the 12 cm CD single edition of "Automatic" and "Time Will Tell" peaked at number two, two positions higher than the former format. In total, the single spent another 23 weeks, tallying it up to a run of 46 chart appearances. This release claimed an additional 1,290,700 units, making this Utada's best-selling physical single; it was listed at number five on Oricon's year-end chart for the same year.

Because of their individual releases, "Automatic" / "Time Will Tell" has sold 2,062,780 copies together, effectively marking it as the second highest-selling single of 1999, just behind "Dango 3 Kyodai" which was a collaborative release between Kentaro Hayami, Ayumi Shigemori, Sunflower Kids, and the Dumpling choir. Furthermore, it is the second highest-selling single by a female artist, only behind Namie Amuro's hit "Can You Celebrate?" which has amassed 2.750 million copies in the region. It was certified million by the Recording Industry Association of Japan (RIAJ) for physical shipments.

== Promotion and cover versions ==
An accompanying music video was directed and produced by Tomu Izawa, and despite Utada's previous musical work, it is their visual debut. It depicts the singer in a red and white room singing the track while a pictorial slideshow of them is played throughout the visual. The clip was included on their 1999 DVD collection Singles Clip Collection Vol. 1, and subsequently on the 15th anniversary edition of First Love, which included all the visuals from the record. In order to promote the single, Utada performed it on two concert tours; its first appearance was during their Bohemian Summer tour in 2000, where it was scheduled as one of the opening numbers. 11 years later, its most recent appearance was during their December 2010 show Wild Life. In 2014, musicians Tofubeats and Bonnie Pink collaborated to record the song for Utada Hikaru no Uta, a tribute album celebrating 15 years since Utada's debut. Tofubeats took only three hours to create the backing track for the cover.

== Track listings and formats ==
Mini CD single

1. "Automatic" – 5:14
2. "Time Will Tell" – 5:30
3. "Automatic" (Original karaoke) – 5:14

CD single

1. "Automatic" – 5:14
2. "Time Will Tell" – 5:30
3. "Time Will Tell" (Dub mix) – 5:36

12" vinyl

1. "Automatic" – 5:14
2. "Time Will Tell" – 5:30
3. "Time Will Tell" (Dub mix) – 5:36

Digital EP

1. "Automatic" – 5:14
2. "Time Will Tell" – 5:30
3. "Time Will Tell" (Dub mix) – 5:36

Untitled 12" vinyl

1. "Movin' on Without You" – 4:40
2. "Movin' on Without You" (Tribal mix) – 4:40
3. "Automatic" – 5:14
4. "Time Will Tell" – 5:30
5. "Time Will Tell" (Dub mix) – 5:36

== Personnel ==
Credits adapted from the CD liner notes of First Love: 15th Anniversary edition.

Musicians and personnel

- Hotoda Goh – mixing
- Kei Kawano – additional arrangement
- Masashi Kudo – recording
- Tsuyoshi Kon – Guitar
- Akira Miyake – production
- Nobuhiko Nakayama – synthesizer programming
- Akira Nishihira – arrangement, keyboards, programming
- Taka & Speedy – rhythm tracks arrangement, programming
- Masaaki Ugajin – recording
- Hikaru Utada – writing, vocals
- Teruzane "Skingg" Utada – production

== Charts and sales ==
=== Charts ===
Chart (1998–1999; 8 cm)	Peak position
Japan Weekly Chart (Oricon)	4
Japan Year-End Chart (Oricon)	22
Chart (1998–1999; 12 cm)	Peak position
Japan Weekly Chart (Oricon)	2
Japan Year-End Chart (Oricon)	5

=== Certifications and sales ===
Region	Certification	Certified units/sales
Japan (RIAJ)	—N/a	772,080 (8cm release)
Japan (RIAJ)	Million	1,290,700 (12cm release)

== Release history ==
Region	Date	Format	Label	Ref.
Japan	December 9, 1998	Mini CD single; CD single; 12" vinyl	Toshiba-EMI	
Japan	December 9, 2014 (Note: "Automatic" was not released individually, but appeared on the remastered versions of Utada Hikaru Single Collection Vol. 1 when it was distributed worldwide.)	Digital download	Universal Music Japan	
Australia	December 9, 2014	Digital download	Universal Music Group	
New Zealand	December 9, 2014	Digital download	Universal Music Group	
United Kingdom	December 9, 2014	Digital download	Universal Music Group	
Ireland	December 9, 2014	Digital download	Universal Music Group	
Germany	December 9, 2014	Digital download	Universal Music Group	
France	December 9, 2014	Digital download	Universal Music Group	
Spain	December 9, 2014	Digital download	Universal Music Group	
Taiwan	December 9, 2014	Digital download	Universal Music Group	
