= First Love (Hikaru Utada album) =

Studio album by Hikaru Utada
- Released: March 10, 1999
- Recorded: August–December 1998
- Studios: Toshiba EMI Studio; Studio Terra; Studio Z'd; Wonder Station Yoyogi; On Air Azabu Studio; Paradise Studio; One Voice Kamazawa Recording Studios; Burnish Stone Recording Studios; Bunkamura Studio; Quad Recording Studios
- Genres: J-pop; R&B; dance-pop
- Length: 54:12
- Labels: Eastworld; Toshiba EMI
- Producers: Akira Miyake; Teruzane Utada

Hikaru Utada chronology
Precious (1998)	First Love (1999)	Distance (2001)

Singles from First Love
- 1. "Automatic" / "Time Will Tell" Released: December 9, 1998; 2. "Movin' on Without You" Released: February 17, 1999; 3. "First Love" Released: April 28, 1999

First Love is the second studio album and debut Japanese language album by Japanese-American singer Hikaru Utada, released on March 10, 1999, by Eastworld.

An R&B and dance-pop album, First Love centres on the theme of love and relationships. The songs were written and recorded over the course of about one year, when Utada was between 14 and 15 years old. Critics' opinions of the album were generally favourable, praising Utada's songwriting and vocal delivery. In its first week of release, the album entered the Oricon Albums Chart at number one with over two million units sold. Since its release, First Love remains the highest-selling Japanese album with nationwide sales of 8.7 million copies. It has also sold 18 million total copies worldwide, making it Utada's best-selling album and the highest-selling album in Asian music history. Due to its enormous sales and revolutionary nature, the album is considered a milestone in the history of Japanese pop music.

Utada promoted the album by releasing three singles: "Automatic"/"Time Will Tell", "Movin' on Without You" and the title track, all of which were accompanied by a music video. They (Note: Utada uses they/them and she/her pronouns. This article uses they/them for consistency.) performed several tracks from the album during several television appearances in 1998 and 1999, and have performed songs during the Utada: In the Flesh 2010 and Wild Life tours. The album was reissued in 2014 for its 15th anniversary as a special edition featuring two additional discs and a bonus live DVD.

== Background ==
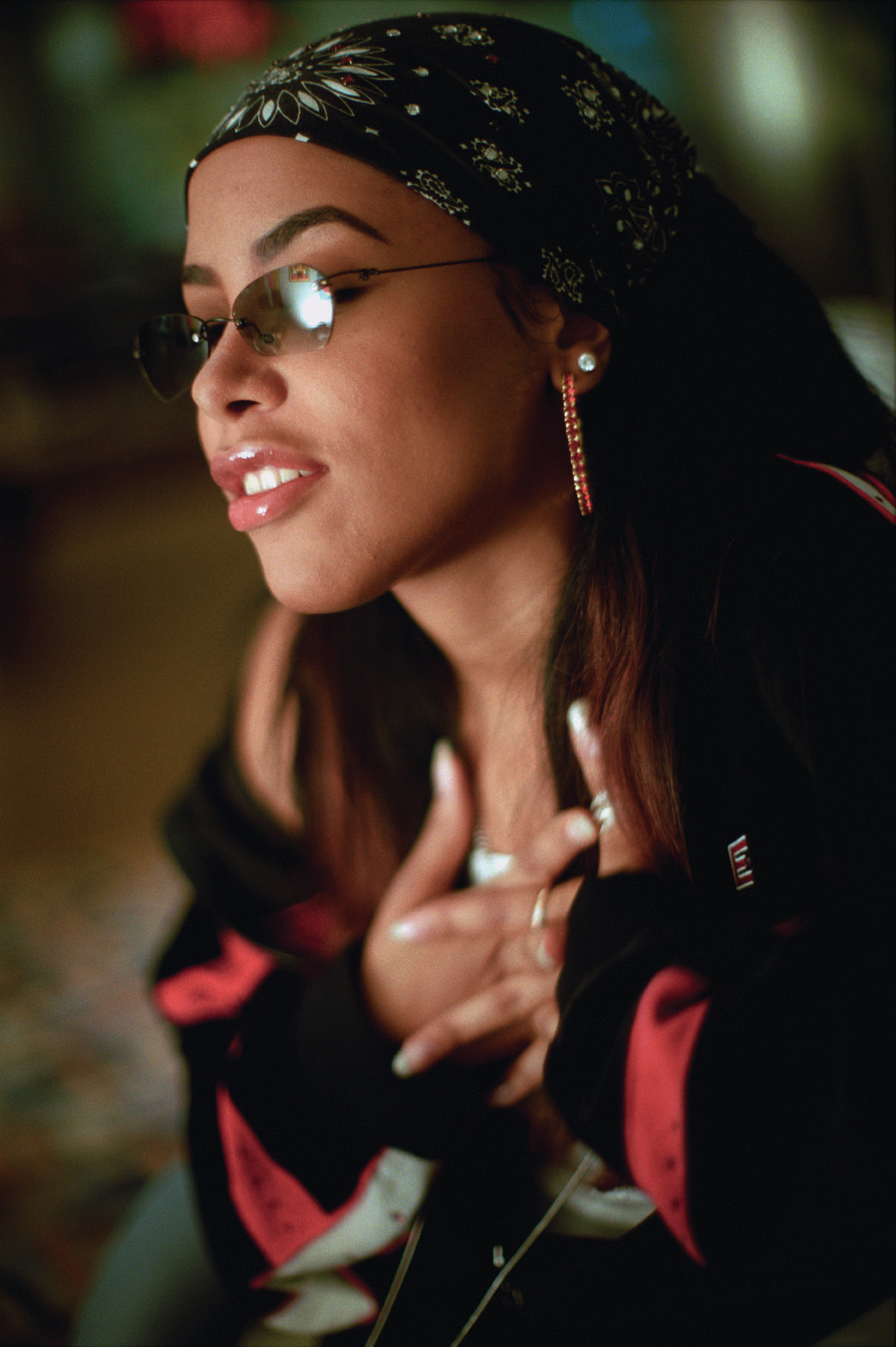
American singer Aaliyah (pictured) was the main influence on the album.

Born and raised in Manhattan, New York City, Utada started singing at a very young age; they were a member of U^{3}, a musical act with their mother Keiko Fuji and their father Teruzane Utada. U^{3} released their debut album Star in 1993, with the hope to debut in America; the album only peaked at thirty-three in Japan. Utada's mother was a Japanese enka singer and actress, while their father was a Japanese record producer who had contributed to some of Fuji's work. In 1996, the group was re-branded as Cubic U, an R&B project that focused primarily on Hikaru, resulting in the English language album Precious in 1998 with record label Toshiba EMI. Precious was originally scheduled to be released simultaneously in Japan and the United States, but due to EMI's internal restructuring issues, the album was not released in the United States and was only released in Japan. 8,000 copies were shipped in Japan at the time of its release, but on March 31, 1999, the album was re-released with a new jacket. At the time of the reissue, First Love, the first album under Hikaru Utada's name released three weeks earlier, had become an unprecedented hit, and the reissued version of Precious also attracted attention, selling approximately 700,000 copies according to Oricon.

Utada relocated to Tokyo in early 1997 to attend Seisen International School and American School in Japan. During their studies, Utada signed as a solo artist with Toshiba EMI and began recording their album First Love. As Utada was fluent in both English and Japanese, the head offices at EMI asked if they could write Japanese songs rather than English lyrics. During the process of the album, Utada desired to become a singer-songwriter rather than becoming a Japanese idol, and occasionally practised producing and composing their own music. They refused to allow talent agencies to contact them at the start, which was a very common tradition for Japanese singers in the 1990s, and their father started to manage their work along with producing and composing it. Aaliyah's album Age Ain't Nothing but a Number was the inspiration for Utada's fascination with rhythm and blues music, and they described Aaliyah's album as being their rhythm and blues roots. Aaliyah's soft, murmuring vocals also influenced Utada's future singing style.

== Production and composition ==
Due to Utada's dedication to their studies, recording was only done on weekends. First, Utada consulted with an arranger to create the sound, and then wrote melodies and lyrics while playing loops of the tracks. In their blog at the time of the album's release, Utada wrote that the "ingredients" for the songs were "Utada Hikaru, a computer, an MD player (recording type), time, a desire to express (the most important), and a deadline (laughs)." The lyrics to the tracks from First Love are written primarily in Japanese by Utada and featured interspersed English-language phrases. (Note: "Amai Wana: Paint it Black" interpolates lyrics from the 1966 song "Paint it Black" by The Rolling Stones.) Utada's father Teruzane and Akira Miyake served as the album's primary producers alongside Hikaru; Saito Masaaki, Nakasone Junya, Sanada Yoshiaki and Okamoto Tatsyua served as the album's executive producers. Utada contributed to editing and producing their recorded vocals for all the tracks. The tracks from First Love were recorded in studios across New York City, Los Angeles and Tokyo. American producer and mixer Ted Jensen had mixed the tracks at Sterling Sound Studios in New York.

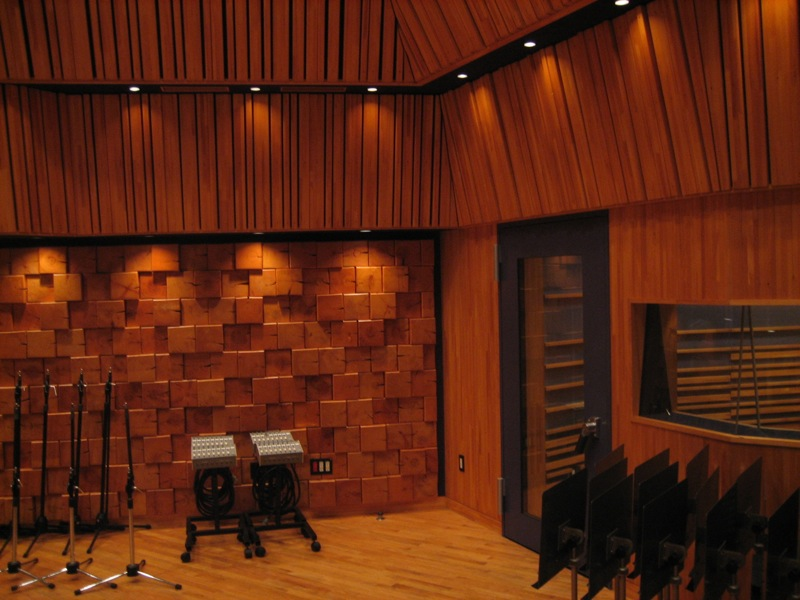
Bunkamura Studio (Shibuya, Tokyo) was one of the studios where the album was recorded

The album's opener, "Automatic", is an R&B and dance-pop song that talks about a previous relationship. Rockin' On Japan's editor and chief Kano had commented that Utada had brought a large prominence of R&B and soul music with the tracks "Automatic" and "Time Will Tell", and felt that "Automatic"'s release introduced a new R&B audience inside of Japan. "Movin' on Without You" is a disco and house-inspired track that was influenced by early 1990s Western dance music. "In My Room" is a mid-tempo number with an R&B feel, incorporating rap and record scratching. The title track is a power ballad conveying slow and off-key vocals that complimented the music to the album. "Amai Wana ~Paint It, Black" features the line "I see a red door and I want it painted black" from the Rolling Stones' song, "Paint It Black".

"Never Let Go" features the same beat used in the Sting song "Shape of My Heart". "B&C", a funk song, was featured as a B-side to the physical CD format from "Movin' on Without You". The story of Adam and Eve was suggested as an idea for a song about a famous couple, but Utada said, "It doesn't seem like me," and "I didn't like it because it symbolizes gender discrimination in the West," so they decided on Bonnie and Clyde, which are heroes of both sexes for Utada, and "B&C" was created. "Another Chance" is a "cool" dance tune that exudes a "mature" and "calm" mood. The album closer "Give Me a Reason" is a trip hop song. "Interlude" was produced into a song called "Kotoba ni Naranai Kimochi" on Utada's Distance album.

== Release ==
First Love was released on March 10, 1999, by Toshiba EMI. The album was released as a compact disc and a double vinyl. The vinyl was exclusively released in North America and Japan by Eastworld Records. First Love was released in the Philippines by OctoArts EMI Music. It was released in South Korea and Indonesia by Eastworld and EMI.

Fifteen years after its release, First Love was re-released by Universal Music Japan on March 10, 2014, in two separate versions. The normal version is a two-disc set featuring a remastered version of the album along with a second disc featuring Utada's previously unreleased "Luv Live" concert. The remastering was done by Ted Jensen. The other version is a limited edition 4-disc set, containing the remastered track list on disc one, "Luv Live" concert on disc two, as well as featuring a disc containing karaoke tracks and the last containing a multitude of demos from the First Love era of Utada's career. The deluxe edition also carries with it memorabilia from that time, including a hard cover booklet filled with unreleased photoshoots, handwritten lyrics, promotional items as well as replicas of the tickets and backstage passes to their "Luv Live" concert. The Deluxe Edition initially was limited to 5,000 copies, however, due to overwhelming demand, this was pushed to 10,000 after the initial 5,000 units were sold almost instantly.

== Singles ==
The double A-side single "Automatic/Time Will Tell" was released on December 9, 1998, as an 8cm mini CD single and 12cm CD single. The songs received positive reviews, being highlighted as standouts on the album. "Automatic" was given the gold award at the 2000 JASRAC awards, beating their own song "Time Will Tell" and "Dango 3 Kyodai" to be the most royalty-receiving song in 1999. The Japan Record Awards mentioned the song as an Honorable Mention Award. In 2000, The Japan Gold Disc Awards had awarded "Automatic" along with "Movin' on Without You" and "Addicted to You" for Song(s) of the Year. "Automatic/Time Will Tell" peaked at number four and number two on the Oricon Singles Chart in their respective formats. With both formats combined, "Automatic/Time Will Tell" has sold over 2.06 million units in Japan, making it their best-selling physical single, (Note: "Automatic/Time Will Tell" is Utada's highest selling physical single to date, with over 2.06 million units sold as of April 2014. However, it is not her highest selling single in terms of digital, ringtone and physical sales. Her 2007 single "Flavor of Life" sold over 650,000 physical units, 2.85 million digital units of the ballad version, and 2.25 million digital units of the original version. These sales tally up to 5.7 million units, Utada's highest selling single to date.) the second best-selling single by a female Japanese soloist and the nineteenth best-selling single in Japan overall.

The second single "Movin' on Without You" was released on February 17, 1999, as a 8cm single and a 12cm single. It served as the commercial song for the Nissan Terrano. The song received positive reviews, many of which highlighted the song as an album stand out. The 8cm single reached number five on the Oricon Singles Chart. The 12cm single reached number one on the Oricon Singles Chart, marking this their first number one. This edition of the single was certified million by the Recording Industry Association of Japan (RIAJ) for shipments of one million units.

The third and final single "First Love" was released on April 28, 1999, as a 8cm mini CD and a 12cm standard CD. "First Love" was used as the theme song for the dorama Majo no Jōken, starring Hideaki Takizawa and Nanako Matsushima. The song received positive reviews, many of which highlighted the song as an album stand out. The 12cm standard CD single of "First Love" peaked at number two on the Oricon Singles Chart, missing the top spot but was certified double platinum by the RIAJ for shipments of 800,000 units in Japan. The 8cm CD version reached number six. At the end of the year, "First Love" became the annual number one song on Taiwan's Hit FM Top 100 Singles of the Year chart for 1999. "First Love" was also adopted as the marching song for the Spring 2000 National High School Baseball Tournament.

== Reception ==
First Love was met with positive reviews from music critics. Japanese magazine CDJournal felt Utada's singing voice and musical style was very heartfelt. Tower Records described the album as "an epoch-making work that played a pioneering role in completely changing the concept of popular music in Japan". Music critic Yoichi Shibuya commented that the album was "different to anything Japanese pop music had produced up until now, with a very high quality and international appeal", and that he felt that "the DNA of Japanese pop music has changed". He also commented on the album's sudden astronomical sales, saying that it "achieved a combination of revolutionary quality and popularity that had previously been thought impossible."

In a 2016 article, OKMusic's Tomoyuki Hokari noted Utada's way of putting words to melody in their work. He praised Utada's "seamless use of words, which makes the most of her unique bilingualism (she is a native speaker of both Japanese and English) – or perhaps even unaware of it – as one of the great inventions in the history of Japanese entertainment," adding, "I don't think anything has yet emerged that surpasses this invention, at least in terms of publicly recognized methods and techniques. I don't think anything has yet emerged that surpasses this invention, at least in terms of methods and techniques recognized by the public." Music Magazine's Yumiko Kakoi commented that "she has successfully and unconsciously made the best parts of R&B and songs into her own." Tomoo Yamaguchi, also of Music Magazine, commented, "The fact that there is nothing obnoxious about her music or singing ability shows the size of her capacity."

== Commercial performance and legacy ==
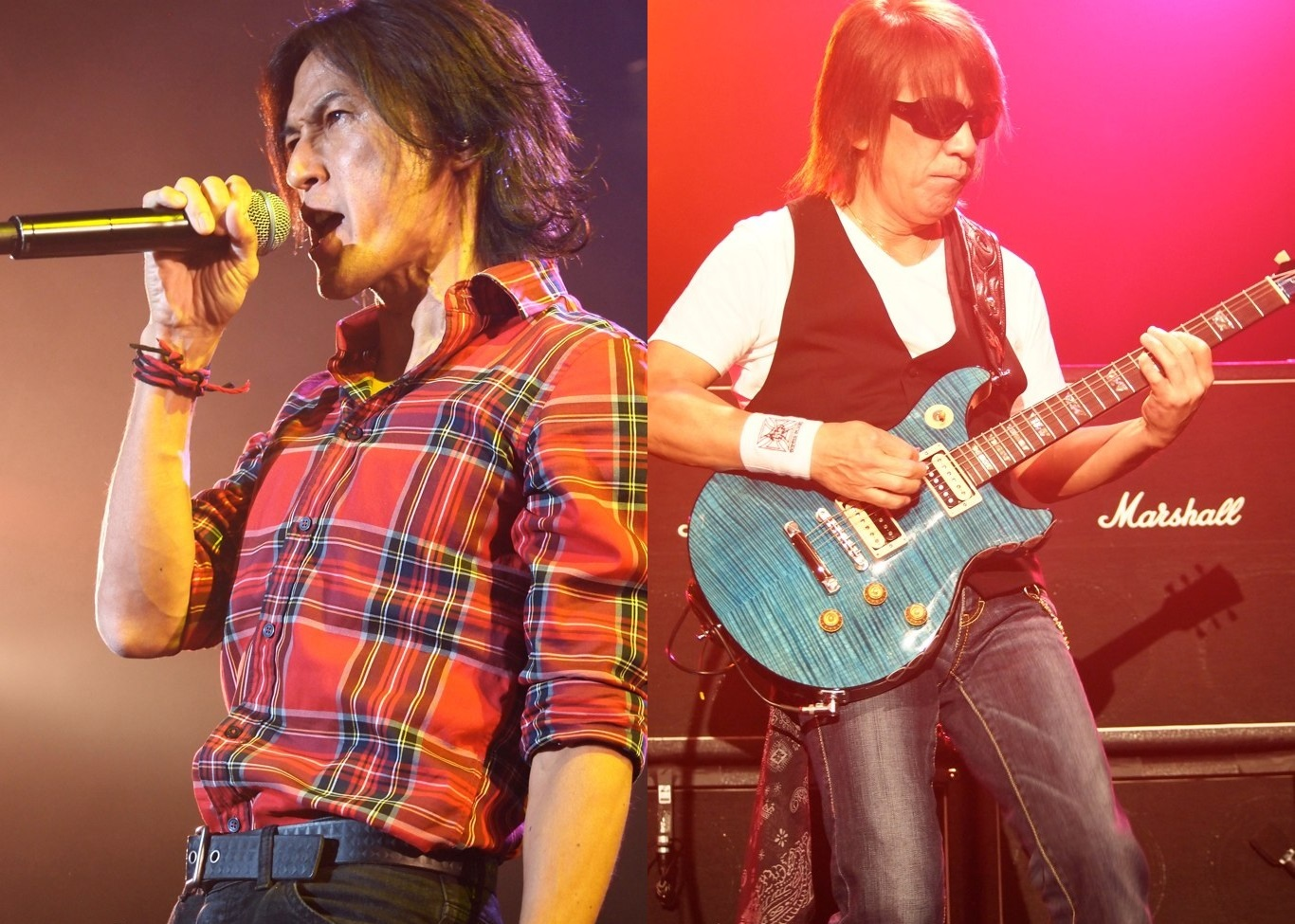
First Love surpassed B'z The Best "Pleasure" by B'z (pictured) as the highest-selling Japanese record in history

First Love entered the Oricon Albums Chart at number one with 2,026,870 units sold. The album sold over five million copies in a month in March and April of 1999 and placed Utada among the 100 wealthiest people in Japan. By the time the album reached its eighth week on the chart on May 10, 1999, cumulative sales had reached 5.239 million copies, making it the best-selling album of all time in Japan. Sales continued to skyrocket, with First Love reaching sales of six million copies on May 31, 1999, the first time in Oricon history that an album has sold more than six million copies. Furthermore, by August 16, 1999, it had sold over seven million copies, making it the number one album of the year and made Utada the year's number one artist in revenue sales, earning revenue sales of ¥28.12 billion (approximately US$182,900,269). First Love stayed at number one for six nonconsecutive weeks and stayed in the top 300 of the chart for 93 weeks in total. Oricon named First Love the best-performing album of 1999 in Japan, with 7,365,830 copies sold by the end of the fiscal year. According to Oricon, the cumulative sales of 7.65 million copies is the highest album sales in Japan ever.

Over 8.13 million copies were sold by the end of the year. By 2014, over 8.7 million copies have been shipped in Japan and 18 million total copies worldwide. First Love is the only album or physical record to have been certified octuple million by the Recording Industry Association of Japan (RIAJ), which is equivalent to being certified 32x platinum by the Recording Industry Association of America (RIAA). The sales of First Love helped it overtake B'z's B'z The Best "Pleasure" as history's highest-selling Japanese album. On August 10, 1999, Toshiba EMI announced that total shipments in Japan had surpassed eight million copies. Alongside its success at home, First Love also sold 500,000 copies in Taiwan, making it the highest-selling Japanese album in Taiwan's music history.

By the end of 1999, Utada was ranked 5th on Japanese radio station Tokio Hot 100 Airplay's Top 100 Artists of the 20th Century by the station and its listeners. In September 2007, Rolling Stone Japan ranked First Love No.99 on its list of the "100 Greatest Japanese Rock Albums of All Time". First Love is the seventh album to claim the highest weekly sales in Japan, behind their 2001 album Distance and 2002 album Deep River.

== Track listing ==
All tracks are written by Hikaru Utada, except where noted.

No.	Title	Arranger	Length
1.	"Automatic" (album edit)	Akira Nishihira, Taka & Speedy (rhythm track arrangement), Kei Kawano (additional arrangement)	5:28
2.	"Movin' on Without You"	Shin'ichiro Murayama	4:38
3.	"In My Room"	Shin'ichiro Murayama	4:19
4.	"First Love"	Kei Kawano	4:17
5.	"Amai Wana (甘いワナ～, Sweet Trap): Paint It, Black"	Akira Nishihira	5:02
6.	"Time Will Tell"	Toshiyuki Mori, Jun Isomura	5:27
7.	"Never Let Go" (Utada, Sting, Dominic Miller (Note: "Never Let Go" interpolates a melody taken from "Shape of My Heart" by Sting. Shortly after the album's release, EMI representatives confirmed on Utada's website that the music was licensed with permission. However, co-crediting was not finalized until after the album's release, so Sting and Miller's co-credits were omitted until later re-releases.))	Kei Kawano	3:57
8.	"B&C" (album version)	Akira Nishihira, Taka & Speedy (rhythm track arrangement)	4:20
9.	"Another Chance"	Akira Nishihira, Taka & Speedy (rhythm track arrangement)	5:22
10.	"Interlude"		0:17
11.	"Give Me a Reason"	Akira Nishihira	6:28
12.	"Automatic (Johnny Vicious Remix)" (bonus track)		4:37
Total length:			54:12

First Love: 15th Anniversary Edition (CD+DVD): DVD Luv Life
No.	Title	Length
1.	"Amai Wana (甘いワナ〜, Sweet Trap): Paint It, Black"
2.	"Time Will Tell"
3.	"In My Room"
4.	"Never Let Go"
5.	"Another Chance"
6.	"Give Me a Reason"
7.	"Automatic"
8.	"Konya wa Boogie Back (今夜はブギー・バック, Boogie Back Tonight)" (featuring Scha Dara Parr; Ozawa Kenji cover)
9.	"First Love"
10.	"Movin' on Without You"

First Love: 15th Anniversary Deluxe Edition (TV Mixes)
No.	Title	Length
1.	"Automatic" (TV mix)	5:14
2.	"Movin' on Without You" (TV mix)	4:44
3.	"In My Room" (TV mix)	4:25
4.	"First Love" (TV mix)	4:21
5.	"Amai Wana (甘いワナ〜, Sweet Trap): Paint It, Black" (TV mix)	5:05
6.	"Time Will Tell" (TV mix)	5:30
7.	"Never Let Go" (TV mix)	4:01
8.	"B&C" (TV mix)	4:23
9.	"Another Chance" (TV mix)	5:22
10.	"Give Me a Reason" (TV mix)	6:22

First Love: 15th Anniversary Deluxe Edition (Bonus Tracks)
No.	Title	Length
1.	"Automatic" (Johnny Vicious Remix)	4:54
2.	"Movin' on Without You" (Tribal Mix)	4:49
3.	"Time Will Tell" (Dub Mix)	5:38
4.	"First Love" (John Luongo Remix)	4:09
5.	"In My Room" (alternate version)	4:23
6.	"Time Will Tell" (English version)	5:28
7.	"Calling You"	2:07
8.	"Kotoba ni naranai kimochi (言葉にならない気持ち, Indescribable Feelings)" (demo version)	1:44
9.	"Movin' on Without You" (demo version)	3:52
10.	"B&C" (demo version)	2:35
11.	"Another Chance" (demo version)	4:57
12.	"First Love" (demo version)	4:42
13.	"Give Me a Reason" (demo version)	1:52
14.	"Automatic" (demo version)	3:04
15.	"Sukiyaki (上を向いて歩こう) Uewomuitearukō (I Look Up as I Walk)" (live version)	1:40

== Personnel ==
All Japanese names are in Western order – given name before family name.

- Hikaru Utada – vocals
- Anthony Jimenez Corton – secret Love, additional chorus
- Akira Nishihira – arrangement, keyboards & programming
- Kei Kawano – arrangement, additional keyboards
- Shinichiro Murayama – arrangement, keyboards & programming
- Toshiyuki Mori – arrangement, keyboards & programming
- Jun Isomura – arrangement
- Tsuyoshi Kon – guitar
- Yoshiaki Kusaka – guitar
- Hironori Akiyama – guitar
- Yuji Toriyama – guitar
- Masayoshi Furukawa – guitar
- Yuichiro Honda – guitar
- Yuichiro Goto – strings
- Jullian Hernandez – additional chorus
- Nobuhiko Nakayama – synthesizer programming
- Takahiro Iida – synthesizer programming
- Masayuki Momo – synthesizer programming
- Taka & Speedy – rhythm arrangement, rhythm programming
- Akira Miyake – producer
- Teruzane Sking Utada – producer
- Hidenobu Okita – director
- Masaaki Ugajin – all vocals' recording
- Masaaki Ugajin, Masashi Kudo, Seiji Motoyama, Takehiko Kamata, Bob Allecca, Mike Brown – back track recording
- Hotoda Goh – mixing
- Ted Jensen – mastering

== Charts ==
=== Weekly charts ===
Weekly chart performance for First Love
Chart (1999–2000)	Peak position
Japanese Albums (Oricon)	1
Malaysian Albums (RIM)	10
Taiwanese International Albums (IFPI)	1

2010 weekly chart performance for First Love
Chart (2010)	Peak position
South Korean International Albums (Gaon)	62

2010 weekly chart performance for First Love
Chart (2014)	Peak position
Japanese Albums (Oricon)	9

2022 weekly chart performance for First Love
Chart (2022)	Peak position
Japanese Albums (Oricon)	10
Japanese Combined Albums (Oricon)	11

=== Year-end charts ===
1999 year-end charts for First Love
Chart (1999)	Position
Japanese Albums (Oricon)	1

2000 year-end charts for First Love
Chart (2000)	Position
Japanese Albums (Oricon)	82

=== Decade-end charts ===
Chart (1990–1999)	Position
Japanese Albums (Oricon)	1

=== All-time chart ===
Chart	Position
Japanese Albums (Oricon)	1

== Certifications and sales ==
Region	Certification	Certified units/sales
Japan (RIAJ)	8× Million	8,700,000
Singapore	—	30,000
South Korea	—	4,244
Taiwan	—	500,000
Summaries
Worldwide	—	17,910,000

== See also ==
- List of best-selling albums by women
- List of best-selling albums in Japan
- List of best-selling albums in Taiwan

Preceded by Time to Destination (Every Little Thing)	Japan Record Award for the Best Album; 1999	Succeeded by Duty (Ayumi Hamasaki)
