= Kanto Plains Association of Secondary School Principals =

Organizationof Secondary School Principals in Kantō, Japan

The Kanto Plains Association of Secondary School Principals (KPASSP) is an organization comprising the principals of various international schools in the Kanto region of Japan.

Members of the association include the principals of the following institutions:

- American School in Japan
- Aoba-Japan International School
- Christian Academy in Japan
- Kinnick High School / Yokosuka Middle School
- St. Mary's International School
- Saint Maur International School
- Seisen International School
- The British School in Tokyo
- International School of the Sacred Heart
- Yokohama International School
- Yokota High School
- Zama High School
- K. International School Tokyo
- Tokyo International School

== Film Festival ==
In 2010, the Kanto Plain Festival makes its debut to KPASSP schools

== Speech Festival ==
Each year KPASSP schools hold a Speech Festival in several categories:

=== Categories ===
- Multiple-Reading
- Original Informative
- Storytelling
- Dramatic Duo
- Original Persuasive
- Poetry Interpretation
- Humorous
- Extemporaneous Speaking
- Dramatic Interpretation

=== Festival Locations ===
- 2017(Fall): Seisen International School
- 2016(Fall): St. Maur International School
- 2014(Fall): St. Maur International School
- 2010(Fall): Seisen International School
- 2010(Spring): St. Mary's International School
- 2009: American School in Japan

== Sports ==
- American Football (ASIJ, Zama, Yokota, Kinnick only)
- Cheerleading (ASIJ, Zama, Yokota, Kinnick only)
- Baseball (ASIJ, SMIS, Zama, Yokota, Kinnick, YIS only)
- Cross country
- Tennis
- Volleyball
- Basketball
- Wrestling
- Soccer / Football
- Field Hockey
- Track & field
- Soccer

== Tokyo Area Honor Choir ==
"Every year, high school students from all over the Kanto Plain region compete to become members of the prestigious Tokyo International Honor Choir." Students accepted are required to practice singing in a specific school with the other international students in the Kanto Plains area.

== Yearly Music Festivals ==
- Fall HS Band and Orchestra
- Vocal Solo and Ensemble
- Instrumental Solo and Ensemble
- HS Jazz Fest
- HS Honor Band
- HS Honor Orchestra
- Spring HS Band and Orchestra
- MS Band
- MS Select Band
- ES Choral
- MS Choral
- HS Choral

== See also ==
- Secondary education in Japan
