= St. Mary's International School =

Coordinates: 35.615108°N 139.63267°E

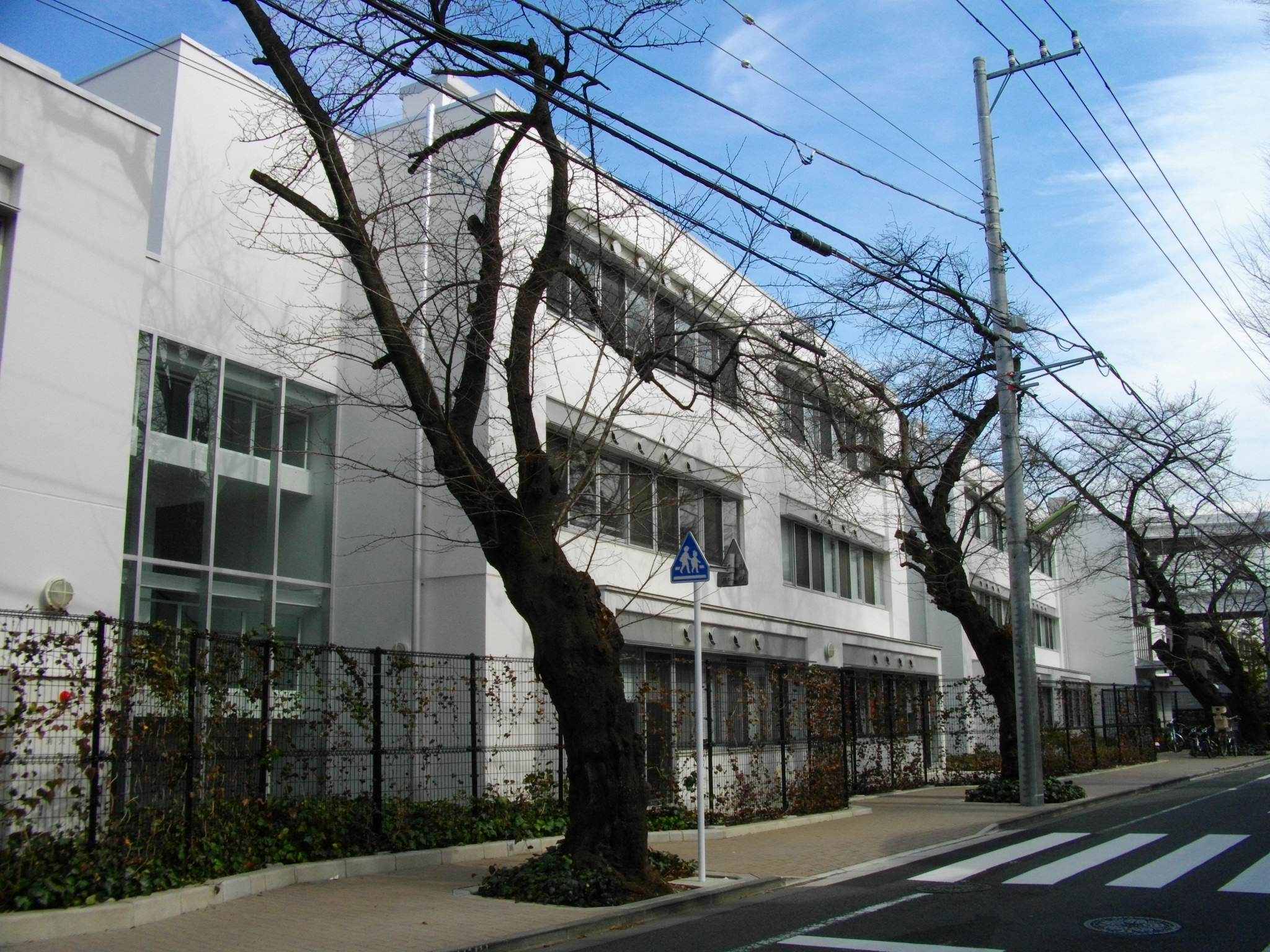
- The school in 2011
- 1-6-19 Seta; Setagaya, Tokyo 158-8668; Tokyo, Japan

Information
- Type: Private
- Motto: A School with a Heart
- Established: 1954
- Head of school: Dr. Andrew Davies
- Grades: K-12
- Enrollment: About 1,000
- Campus size: 9-acre (36,000 m^{2})
- Campus type: International School
- Colours: Blue and Gold
- Team name: Titans
- Affiliation: Catholic
- Website: www.smis.ac.jp

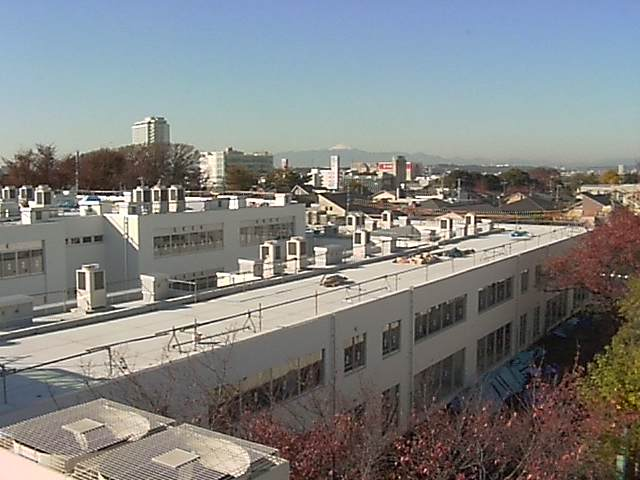
School Reconstruction, 2008

St. Mary's International School is a private international school for boys located in the Setagaya ward of Tokyo, Japan. The school consists of an elementary, middle, and high school, all located on the Setagaya campus. The school's primary language of instruction is English, and it also offers the International Baccalaureate program.

Originally established to serve the children of foreign residents in Tokyo with a Western-style, English-language curriculum, over time it has welcomed a growing number of Japanese students seeking international education. Though rooted in Catholic tradition, the school accepts students of all faiths and backgrounds. Religious education is offered, and Catholic students may attend Mass, though participation is voluntary.

== History ==
St. Mary's International School was founded in 1954 by the Brothers of Christian Instruction, a Catholic religious teaching order established in France in 1819 by Jean-Marie de La Mennais and Gabriel Deshayes. Originally located in current-day Takanawa district of Minato City, near the historic Sengaku-ji temple, the school moved to its current Setagaya campus in 1971.

In 2014, multiple allegations of historical sexual abuse emerged against members of the school's religious staff. Brother Lawrence Lambert, who, in a handwritten letter obtained by victims, confessed to raping a student in the 1960s. Other victims came forward with accusations against Brother Benoit Lessard, who allegedly abused students on school-organized trips during the 1970s.

One of the victims, David McNeill, produced a documentary chronicling his and others’ experiences. In response, the school launched an internal investigation and contacted Tokyo police and the Catholic Archdiocese. The case received renewed media attention in 2019 when international reports noticed silencing of abuse victims in Japan’s Catholic institutions.

== Accreditation ==
St. Mary's is accredited by the Council of International Schools and the Western Association of Schools and Colleges. It is a member of the East Asia Regional Council of Overseas Schools and the Japan Council of International Schools.

== Campus ==
The 9-acre (36,000 m^{2}) campus features a large, lighted indoor swimming pool with a balcony for visiting audiences, an indoor multi-athletic court with a retractable stage and seat, a large multi-purpose hall which converts into an auditorium, number of tennis courts, two outdoor basketball courts, a large soccer field with appropriate synthetic grass, a mass of gardened land, and numbers of other athletic facilities. The three-story classroom buildings hold classes for grades 1 through 12, plus a readiness program and programs for students using English as a second language (ESL). Additionally, the school features two large libraries for study, one of them featuring an outdoor 'rooftop' garden, and has computer access throughout all if its classrooms. A chapel and on-site residency for the brothers are also available.

The school is served by the Futako-Tamagawa Station (Tōkyū Den-en-toshi Line) and Kami-noge Station (Tōkyū Ōimachi Line) train stations. A fleet of 11 buses owned by the school moves students throughout Tokyo. Seisen International School, a Catholic girls' school, also allows their students to ride on St. Mary's school bus system.

== Athletics ==
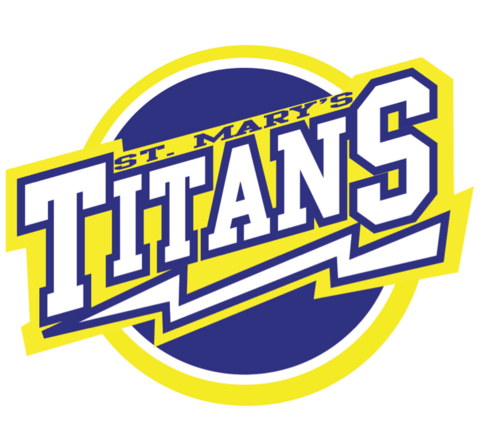
Titans Athletics

St. Mary's encourages its students to join sports teams. The teams' name is the Titans, except the swim team (which also includes students from Seisen International School), which is known as the Buccaneers. The St. Mary's teams compete against other KPASSP schools and have won KPASSP titles, and compete against other international schools.

=== High School Extra-Curricular Athletic Programs ===
Fall
- Cross Country
- Tennis
- Intramurals: Table Tennis, Badminton, Handball, 3-on-3 Basketball, Indoor Soccer, Volleyball
- Swimming

Winter

- Soccer
- Basketball
- Wrestling
- Swimming

Spring

- Track and Field
- Baseball
- Swimming

=== Recent Athletic Highlights ===
- 2018 Far East Individual and Duals Co-Champions, Wrestling
- 2017 Far East Individual and Duals Champions, Wrestling
- 2016 Far East Individual and Duals Champions, Wrestling
- 2016 Kanto Individual Champions, Wrestling
- 2016 Kanto League Champions, Wrestling
- 2016 Kanto League Champions, Basketball
- 2016 Far East Individual Champions, Cross Country
- 2015 Far East Individual Champions, Wrestling
- 2014 Far East Individual Champions, Wrestling
- 2013 Kanto Tournament Champions, Soccer
- 2012 Kanto League Champions, Soccer
- 2012 Far East Champions, Wrestling
- 2011 Kanto League Champions, Soccer
- 2011 Far East Champions, Wrestling
- 2011 Kanto League Champions, Wrestling
- 2011 Guam Invitational Champions, Cross Country
- 2011 Kanto League Champions, Cross Country
- 2011 Far East Champions, Tennis
- 2011 Kanto League, Kanto Tournament Champion, Tennis
- 2010 Kanto League, Kanto Tournament Champions, Baseball
- 2010 Kanto League, Kanto Tournament, Hawaii Moanalua Thanksgiving Tournament Champions, Varsity Soccer
- 2009 Kanto League, Kanto Tournament, Okinawa Spring Fling Tournament Champions, Baseball
- 2009 Far East Boys Class AA Champion, Varsity Basketball
- 2009 Kanto co-league champion, JV Basketball
- 2009 Kanto tournament champion, Varsity Soccer
- 2009 Kanto league and tournament champion, JV Soccer
- 2009 Kanto co-league champions; CAJ/SMIS tournament champ, Wrestling

=== Opponents ===
St. Mary's' main rival is the American School in Japan. Many athletic games have been played by the two schools, and both teams strive to beat each other. Other regional rivals include Christian Academy in Japan, Nile C. Kinnick High School, Yokota High School, The British School in Tokyo and Yokohama International school.

== Fine Arts ==
St. Mary's Fine Arts include:

- Vocal Music
- Instrumental Music
- 2-D Art
- 3-D Art
- Photography
- Architecture
- BrainBowl Team
- Robotics Team
- Debate Team
- Speech Team
- Math Contest Team
- Fall Play
- Musical

Students can earn International Baccalaureate credit in some courses.

The vocal music program features groups such as the Men's Choir, Varsity Ensemble and International Show Choir. These award-winning choirs have performed in the United States, Austria, Hungary, Canada, Australia, China, South Korea, Indonesia, and many other countries. St. Mary's high schoolers may also take part in the Tokyo Area Honor Choir amongst other KPASSP schools, if they are accepted through auditioning.

The instrumental music program features groups such as the Concert Band, Jazz Band, and the Wind Ensemble. Seisen International School collaborates with St. Mary's for the Orchestra used in the Musical. Similarly to the choir, high schoolers may take part in the Tokyo Area Honor Band amongst other KPASSP schools, if they are accepted through auditioning.

2-D Art, 3-D Art, and Architecture courses are also provided at the school, with students taking the International Baccalaureate being able to take these classes as credited courses. Notable artwork usually gets into the Tokyo Artscape, an annual exhibit collaborated on by some KPASSP schools, and some other Tokyo Area schools.

The BrainBowl Team competes in the annual BrainBowl tournament, where SMIS has proven to be a powerhouse, capturing the title 32 times out of the 41 championships. The last title it won was in 2018, the most recent tournament, with a 150-point lead ahead of its next school.

The Debate Team at St. Mary's is also particularly strong, and competes against Seisen International School, The American School in Japan, the International School of the Sacred Heart, and Yokota High School. The team has won the annual Kanto Plains Debate Tournament three years in a row, from 2010 to 2012. It also won in 2021, with all three All-Stars being from St. Mary's.

The Speech Team at SMIS is also a strong team, and they compete in the annual Speech Contest amongst other KPASSP schools. In the most recent tournament, held at Seisen in Fall 2012, the SMIS Speech Team won second place.

Each year, the Math Contest team, composed of students skilled at math, take part in the Math Field Day, a tournament for KPASSP students. St. Mary's tends to do particularly well there too, with usually at least 1 member of the team in the Top 5 at every grade level.

The fall showcases the Fall Play, where selected students perform and help to make it an annual success, while every year in the spring, selected students perform and help in the Musical.

The fall also showcases the Varsity Robotics Team which competes internationally and nationally in competitive Robotics.

== Activities ==
Activities at St. Mary's include a student newspaper, The Diplomat; a Boy Scouts of America troop, Troop 15; the Yearbook; a television club; the Fall Play; a Musical; and others.

== St. Mary's Campus Reconstruction ==
St. Mary's has completed all phases of a complete campus reconstruction, the St. Mary's Campus Reconstruction project. The main academic and administrative center has opened on the site of the former sports field, in March 2009. Construction of the new pool/cafeteria and gym/art/music buildings was completed in August 2010. The Multi-Purpose Room and Parking Lot were completed in March 2011.

Phase	Dates	Description
Phase 1	March 2008–March 2009	Classrooms/Administration Building & Brothers' Residence
Phase 2	April 2009–August 2010	Gym/Art/Music Building, Pool/Cafeteria Building, Playfield
Phase 3	September 2010–March 2011	Multi-Purpose Facility, Parking Lot
Phase 4	July 2015-November 2015	Multi-Purpose Hall (auditorium)

== Notable alumni ==
- Antoine Revoy
- Chris Peppler
- Don Nomura
- John Ken Nuzzo
- Derrek Lee
- Verbal
- Taku Takahashi
- Charles Tsunashima
- Keitaro Harada
- Daisuke Murakami
- Nam Do-hyon, member of X1

== See also ==
- List of high schools in Tokyo
