= Alfonso Soriano =

Dominican baseball player (born 1976)

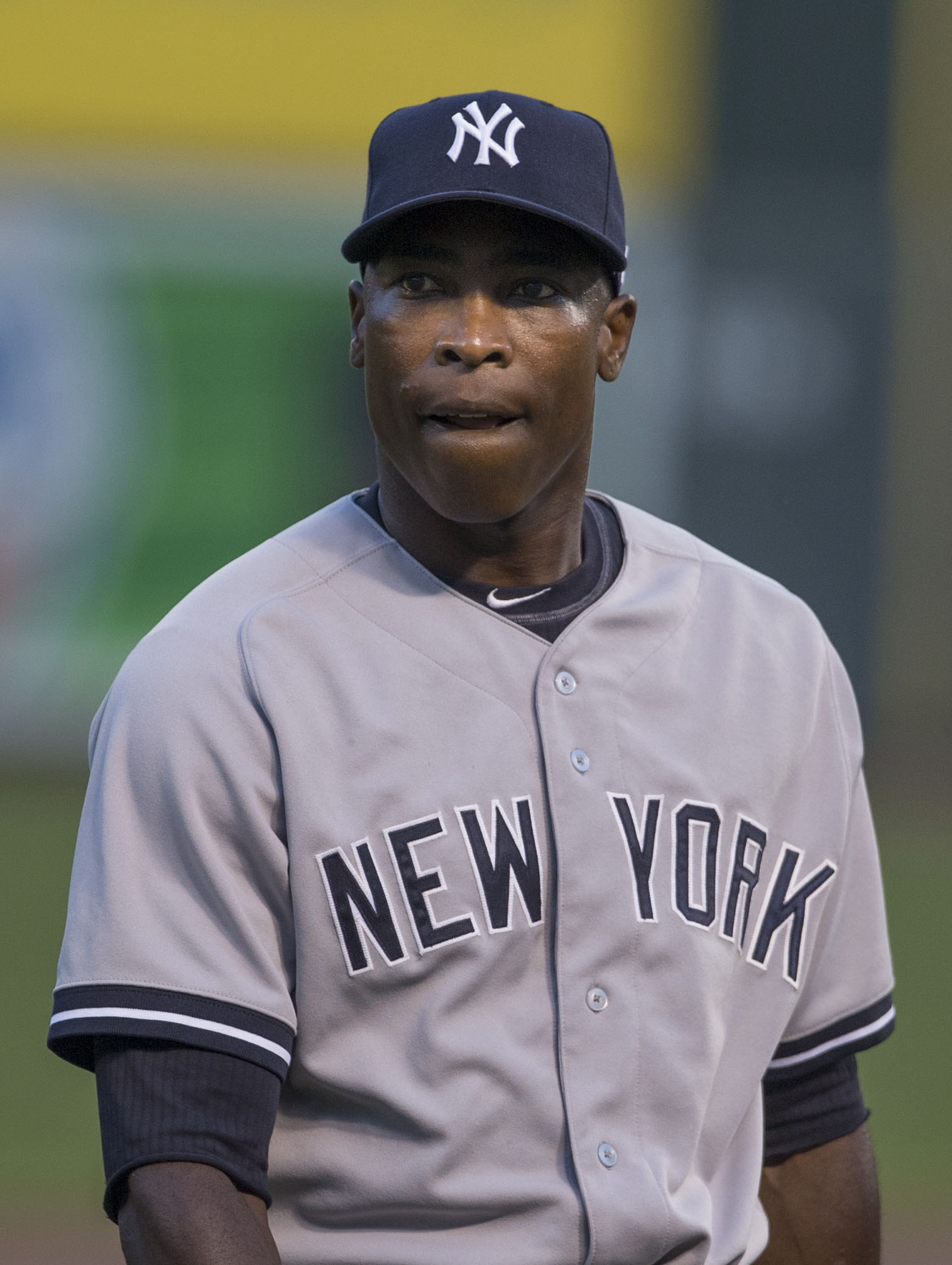
- Soriano with the New York Yankees in 2013
- Left fielder / Second baseman
- Born: January 7, 1976 (age 50); San Pedro de Macorís, Dominican Republic
- Batted: Right Threw: Right

Professional debut
- NPB: August 5, 1997, for the Hiroshima Toyo Carp
- MLB: September 14, 1999, for the New York Yankees

Last appearance
- NPB: August 17, 1997, for the Hiroshima Toyo Carp
- MLB: July 5, 2014, for the New York Yankees

MLB statistics
- Batting average: .270
- Hits: 2,095
- Home runs: 412
- Runs batted in: 1,159
- Stats at Baseball Reference

Teams
- Hiroshima Toyo Carp (1997); New York Yankees (1999–2003); Texas Rangers (2004–2005); Washington Nationals (2006); Chicago Cubs (2007–2013); New York Yankees (2013–2014)

Career highlights and awards
- 7× All-Star (2002–2008); 4× Silver Slugger Award (2002, 2004–2006); AL stolen base leader (2002)

Alfonso Guilleard Soriano (born January 7, 1976) is a Dominican-American former professional baseball left fielder and second baseman. He played in Major League Baseball (MLB) for the New York Yankees, Texas Rangers, Washington Nationals, and Chicago Cubs, and in Nippon Professional Baseball for the Hiroshima Toyo Carp.

Soriano began his professional career with Hiroshima in 1996, but signed with the Yankees as a free agent in 1998 and was assigned to play in minor league baseball. The next year, he was the Most Valuable Player (MVP) in the All-Star Futures Game, and made his MLB debut for the Yankees, with whom he would win two American League championships. The Yankees traded Soriano to the Rangers after the 2003 season, and the Rangers traded Soriano to the Nationals after the 2005 season. He signed a contract as a free agent with the Cubs before the 2007 season. The Cubs traded Soriano to the Yankees in 2013, and the Yankees released him in 2014.

Soriano was a seven-time MLB All-Star, and won the All-Star Game MVP Award in 2004. He won the Silver Slugger Award four times. He is one of only seven players in the 40–40 club, achieving the feat in 2006. He played primarily as a second baseman for the Yankees and Rangers before being converted to an outfielder with the Nationals. Soriano is one of only 58 major league players to hit 400 or more career home runs, and was seventh among active players in home runs at the time of his retirement.

== Professional career ==
=== Hiroshima Toyo Carp (1996–1997) ===
Soriano began his professional baseball career in Japan with the Hiroshima Toyo Carp, training at their Carp Academy for Dominican players. Soriano spent 1996 playing in Japan in the minor Western League. In 1997, he was promoted to the varsity team, and, wearing uniform number 74, he appeared in nine games, batting .118 (2 for 17) with two walks.

Soriano disliked the intense Japanese practice schedule, and the Carp denied him a salary increase from $45,000 to $180,000 per year. Like Hideo Nomo and Hideki Irabu, who had previously left Japan to play in the United States, Soriano hired sports agent Don Nomura to help his situation. After first attempting to void Soriano's Nippon Professional Baseball (NPB) contract by unsuccessfully arguing that the player was legally a minor when he signed it, Nomura advised him, like Nomo, to retire from NPB and pursue a career in MLB. This prompted Carp executives to file an injunction against Soriano, and to send letters to MLB teams demanding that they cease all negotiations with him. After the Nomo case, NPB officials had amended the Working Agreement without consulting any MLB officials in an attempt to prevent the situation from recurring. Since MLB had not agreed to any changes to the agreement, MLB Commissioner Bud Selig declared that MLB would recognize Soriano as a free agent on July 13, 1998 and the Carp backed down.

=== New York Yankees (1998–2003) ===
Soriano signed as a free agent with the New York Yankees in 1998, starting his career as an infielder, first as a third baseman, and then moving over to second base. Soriano was named to the All-Star Futures Game in 1999. He won the game's most valuable player award after hitting two home runs in the contest.

He played in New York for five seasons. His first hit in MLB came in 1999 when he hit a game-winning home run against Norm Charlton of the Tampa Bay Devil Rays. He finished in third place for Rookie of the Year honors in 2001. In the World Series that year, he hit the go-ahead home run off Arizona Diamondbacks pitcher Curt Schilling in the seventh game, but Arizona won anyway when Luis Gonzalez hit his series-winning single on a cut fastball by closer Mariano Rivera.

In 2002, Soriano became the second Yankee in franchise history to record 30 home runs and 30 stolen bases in the same season (the first being Bobby Bonds in 1975), then repeated the feat in 2003. Also in 2002, he led the American League with 696 at bats, 209 hits, 92 extra base hits, 41 stolen bases, 128 runs and set a Yankees' team record for most at bats (696) and most strikeouts (157) in a season.

In 2003, Soriano set the record for most home runs to lead off a game in a season with 13, and for the second straight year, led the league in at bats, and finished in the top five for base hits, doubles, home runs, stolen bases, and strikeouts. In 2003 he again led the major leagues in power-speed number (36.4).

=== Texas Rangers (2004–2005) ===
In 2004, the Yankees traded Soriano to the Texas Rangers, along with minor leaguer Joaquin Árias for Alex Rodriguez and cash amounting to $67 million of the $179 million remaining on Rodríguez' contract.

On May 8, 2004, Soriano had six hits in nine innings—the first Texas Ranger to do so—in a 16–15, 10-inning victory over the Detroit Tigers. The game featured an hour-long fifth inning, where Detroit scored eight runs in the top half of the inning to take a ten-run lead over the Rangers, only to see Texas score ten runs in the bottom half of the inning to tie the game, the largest deficit ever overcome by the Rangers and tying an MLB record for most runs in an inning by two teams. That same year, Soriano was elected to the All-Star Game as the starting second baseman. He hit a three-run home run off Roger Clemens in the first inning and was named the MVP of the game.

In 2005, he finished sixth in the AL for stolen bases, and third for extra base hits (as well as eighth in strikeouts). He led the major leagues in power-speed number (32.7).

=== Washington Nationals (2006) ===
On December 7, 2005, Soriano was traded to the Washington Nationals in exchange for Brad Wilkerson, Terrmel Sledge, and minor league pitcher Armando Galarraga. On February 10, 2006, Soriano set a record for the highest salary ever awarded in arbitration, receiving $10 million, even though he lost his request of $12 million. The previous high had been set in 2001 by Andruw Jones of the Atlanta Braves when he earned $8.2 million. The Nationals offered Soriano a five-year, $50-million extension, but Soriano rejected the offer. Soriano and his agent Diego Bentz instead opted to open contract negotiations during the off-season, so that he would become a free agent.

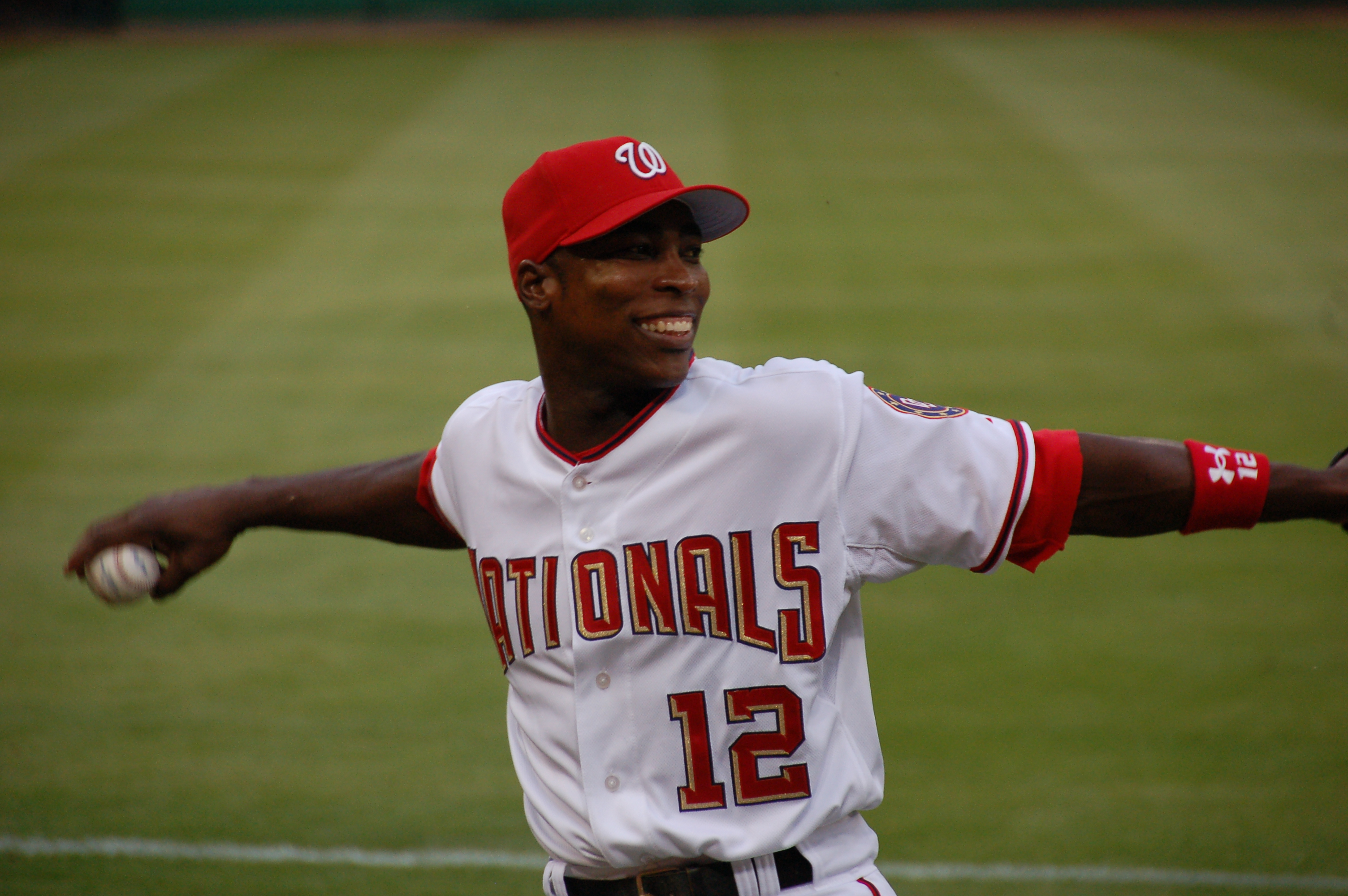
Soriano with the Washington Nationals in 2006

On March 20, 2006, Nationals manager Frank Robinson inserted Soriano in the lineup as the left fielder. Soriano, who since 2001 had played exclusively at second base, refused to take the field, and the Nationals organization threatened him with disqualification, which would have meant forfeiture of his salary, and he would not have received credit for service time in fulfillment of the obligations of his contract. With his contract's service terms officially still unfulfilled, he would then have been ineligible for free agency at season's end. Two days later, Soriano relented and played in left field for the Nationals in their exhibition game against the St. Louis Cardinals. Robinson indicated that he considered Soriano's move to left field to be permanent and would not consider moving Soriano back to second base at any point during the season. In his comments following that game, Soriano indicated that he would accept his new position without further argument. As the season got underway, Soriano began to enjoy his new position, and by the All-Star break he led the league in outfield assists. Soriano made his fifth consecutive All-Star team and became only the third man to start All-Star games for both leagues at two different positions.

On August 25, a week after reaching 30–30, he became the fastest man in baseball history to reach 200 home runs and 200 stolen bases, reaching the mark in 929 games (breaking the previous record of 1,053 games held by Eric Davis). He held it until 2026, when Ronald Acuña Jr. achieved it in 904 games.

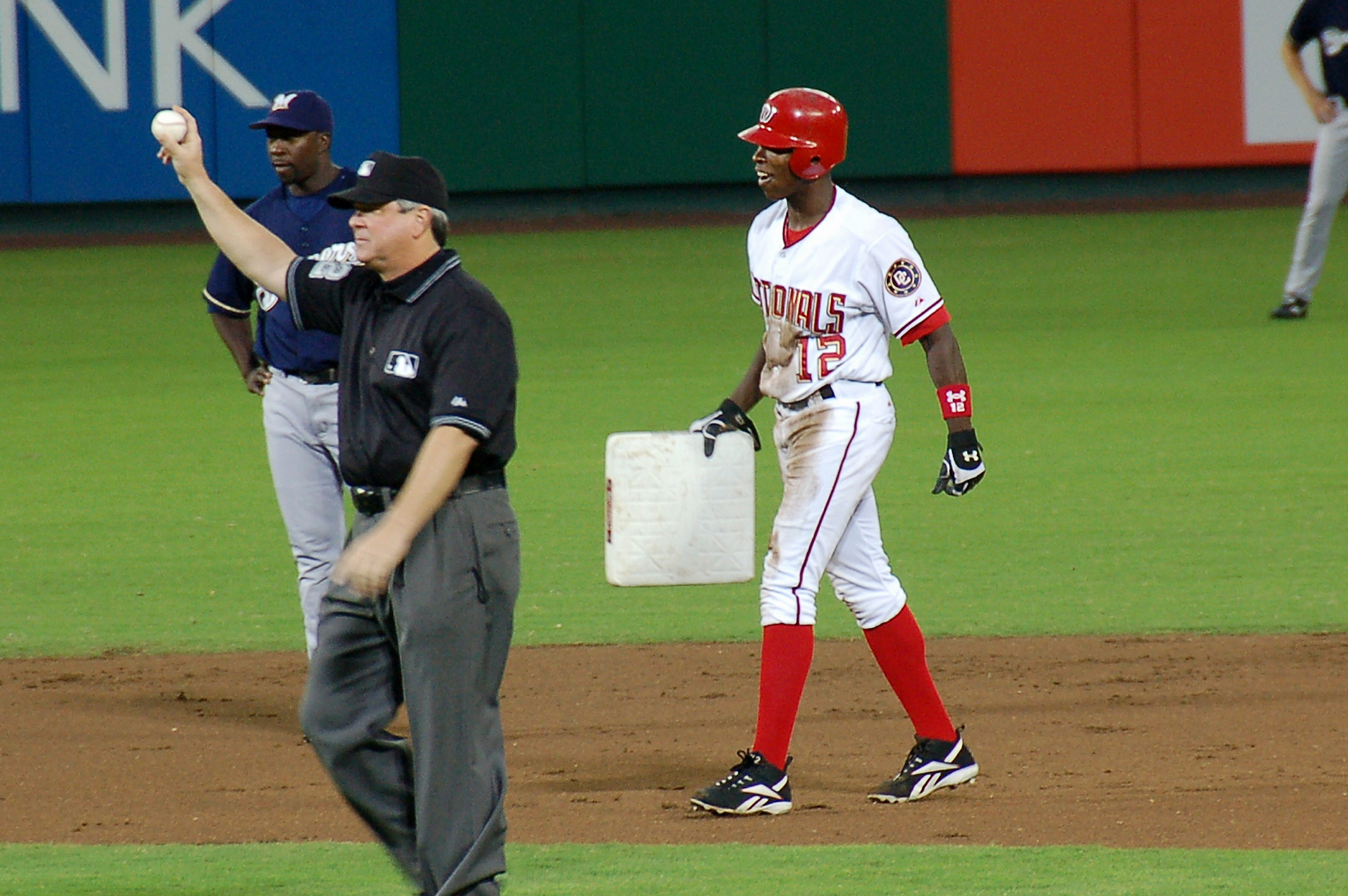
Alfonso Soriano joins the 40–40 club by stealing his 40th base against the Milwaukee Brewers at RFK Stadium, September 16, 2006

In September, he completed his 20th outfield assist, becoming the only player in baseball history with 40 home runs, 40 stolen bases, and 20 assists.

On September 16, Soriano stole second base in the first inning to become the fourth player to join the 40–40 club, after Jose Canseco, Barry Bonds, and Alex Rodriguez. Many considered Soriano's 40–40 season to be the only one to date "clean", as Canseco, Bonds and Rodriguez were all involved in the steroid controversy (three more players have since joined). Soriano was also the only one of the four to reach the feat while playing at home. Six days later, he became the first player to reach 40 home runs, 40 stolen bases and 40 doubles in one season.

Soriano set a new career high in walks with 67 (previously 38). He also reached a career high in home runs with 46 (previously 39). He also led the National League in extra-base hits (89) and the major leagues in power-speed number (43.36), the latter of which was the second-highest single season career mark ever until Ronald Acuna Jr. set a new record in 2023.

==== Possible trade ====
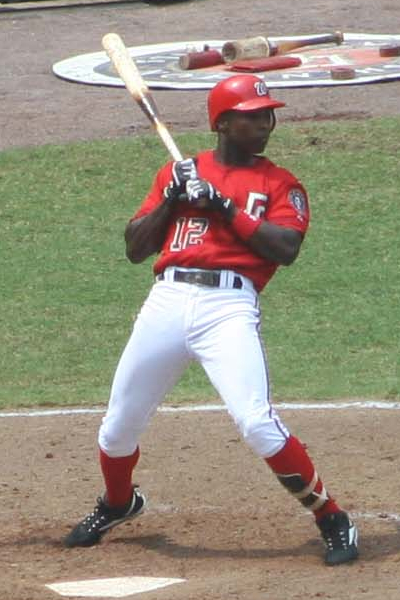
Alfonso Soriano batting for the Nationals in 2006

The Nationals considered trading Soriano before the deadline on July 31, because he was in the last year of his contract, which would grant him free agency at the end of the season. If the Nationals lost Soriano at the end of the season, they would receive a first- or second-round draft pick from the team that signed him and a "sandwich" pick between the first and second rounds as compensation. Soriano did not want to engage in contract negotiations during the season. However, Soriano expressed his strong desire to stay with the team. Both fans and players began to be more vocal in their support to keep Soriano. Manager Frank Robinson praised Soriano's leadership in the clubhouse, and further suggested that Soriano should be considered for MVP of the National League. There were plenty of suitors, including sending Soriano back to the Yankees, and the Chicago Cubs and Los Angeles Dodgers were also interested. However, Nationals general manager Jim Bowden felt that what he was offered was not worth trading him. The Nationals hoped to sign him to a long-term deal before the season ended but on October 12, 2006 he rejected a $70 million deal.

=== Chicago Cubs ===
==== 2007 ====
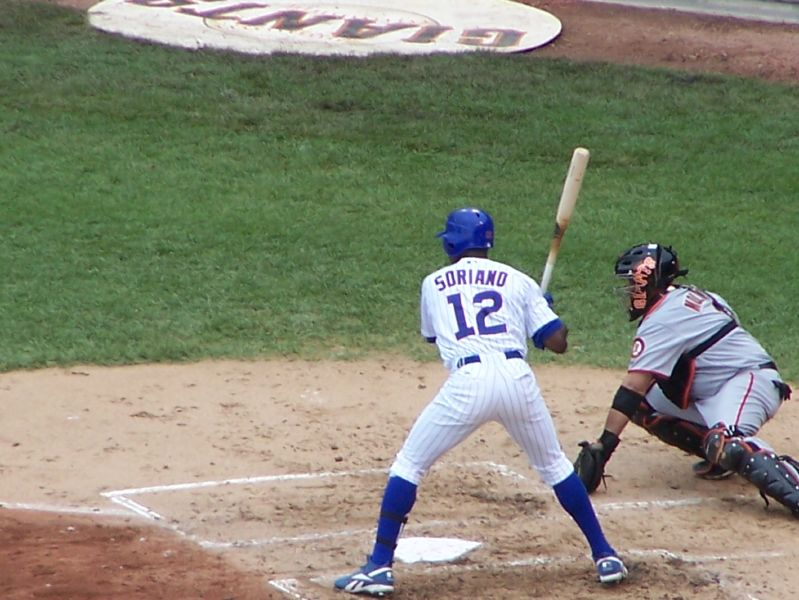
Soriano at bat against the San Francisco Giants

The Chicago Cubs signed Soriano to an eight-year contract worth nearly $136 million. The contract marked the most expensive deal in the Cubs' franchise history at the time and went through 2014. It contained a no-trade clause, meaning Soriano could not be traded without his consent. The Cubs' manager, Lou Piniella, assigned Soriano to play center field, but later moved him to left field after he sustained a hamstring injury. He struggled during the first month of the season, during which he posted a .270 batting average, with no home runs. He managed to hit his first home run during the Cubs' first game in May, and gradually increased his batting average throughout the month.

Soriano was extremely productive in June. In a game against the Atlanta Braves, Soriano hit three home runs off Lance Cormier. Soriano had accomplished the same feat in his past, coincidentally, also against the Atlanta Braves. Soriano also played an integral part in the Cubs' offense during the team's annual Cross-town Classic with the Chicago White Sox at US Cellular Field. He hit home runs in three consecutive games.

His efforts merited the National League's Player of the Month title for June. He was later selected as a reserve outfielder in the 2007 MLB All-Star Game, where he hit a two-run home run for the National League in the bottom of the ninth inning. Soriano led the Cubs in home runs during their National League Central chase in June and July, during which they erased the Milwaukee Brewers' eight game lead over the division. After losing the tie for first in early August, Soriano tore his right quadriceps during a game against the New York Mets on August 5. The Cubs placed him on the fifteen-day disabled list, and expected him to miss several weeks while recovering from the injury.

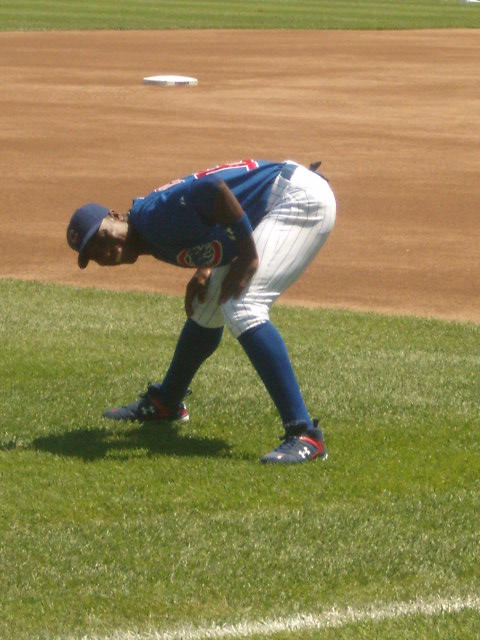
"Fonzie" hams it up with fans during pregame warmups

The Cubs used Matt Murton, who had been recalled from the Triple-A Iowa Cubs, in left field. He began to show signs of improvement around on August 21, when he was seen running and working out with trainers. Soriano stated he felt healthy enough to return in a few days, but made his actual return on August 28, 2007. Upon his return, Soriano proceeded to have the most productive September in the franchise's history. He hit fourteen home runs, twenty-seven runs batted in, and recorded a .320 batting average within twenty-nine games. Soriano said upon his return from the quad injury that he had also been suffering from wrist injuries and the time off to heal his leg also helped his wrists. The Cubs went on to win the National League Central Division, but were swept by the Arizona Diamondbacks in the National League Division Series. Soriano finished the season with thirty-three home runs (including eleven lead-off home runs), seventy runs batted in, and a .299 batting average. He led the Cubs in home runs, triples, runs, strikeouts, and Slugging percentage, among all regular starters.

==== 2008 ====
During the first few weeks of the 2008 season with the Cubs, Soriano struggled. He was only hitting .190 at the time he was put on the DL with a strained calf. After being activated, Soriano got off to a quick start, raising his average to .280 and increasing his home run total. In a one-week stretch in May, he hit 7 home runs in just 6 games, hitting nearly .500 during that stretch. At the end of May he had 12 home runs and 33 RBIs. However, his defense was extremely poor, and after being placed on the DL early in the season, Soriano was encouraged to stop hopping as he caught fly balls. This seemed to affect his play in the field as he misjudged two balls in St. Louis on May 2, shortly after being activated. After being severely booed by Cub fans who had traveled to St. Louis in that particular game, he homered in the ninth to send the game to extra innings. Later that month, he lost a ball in the sun and dropped what would have been the game's final out in the 9th inning against the Pittsburgh Pirates, allowing Jason Bay to reach safely and eventually costing the Cubs a win.

On June 11, 2008, Soriano was hit by a pitch and broke a bone just under the ring finger in his left hand. On July 7, 2008, Soriano was voted a starter in the 2008 MLB All-Star Game. However, due to the injury, he was replaced in the starting lineup by Matt Holliday of the Colorado Rockies.

As poor as Alfonso's defense was perceived to be, his arm had been just as much an asset to the Cubs, and he was one of the league's leaders in outfield assists. Soriano also led the team in home runs, despite having played in only 109 games. On August 22, Soriano accomplished one of baseball's rarest feats, as he stole home plate in a loss to his old team, the Washington Nationals.

In early September, Soriano helped end the Cubs six-game losing streak by slugging out three home runs with five RBI against the Cincinnati Reds. It marked the third three-home run game of his career. However, as the Cubs went into the playoffs against the Los Angeles Dodgers, Soriano, like nearly everyone else on the team, hit poorly in the NLDS.

Soriano had an embarrassing moment in a day-night double header on Wednesday, August 13, 2008, where he hit a long ball which he thought was a home run. He watched it, and slowly trotted down to 1st, yet the ball never left the park. He wound up with only a single. Between games, he apologized to his team and promised that it would never happen again.

==== 2009 ====
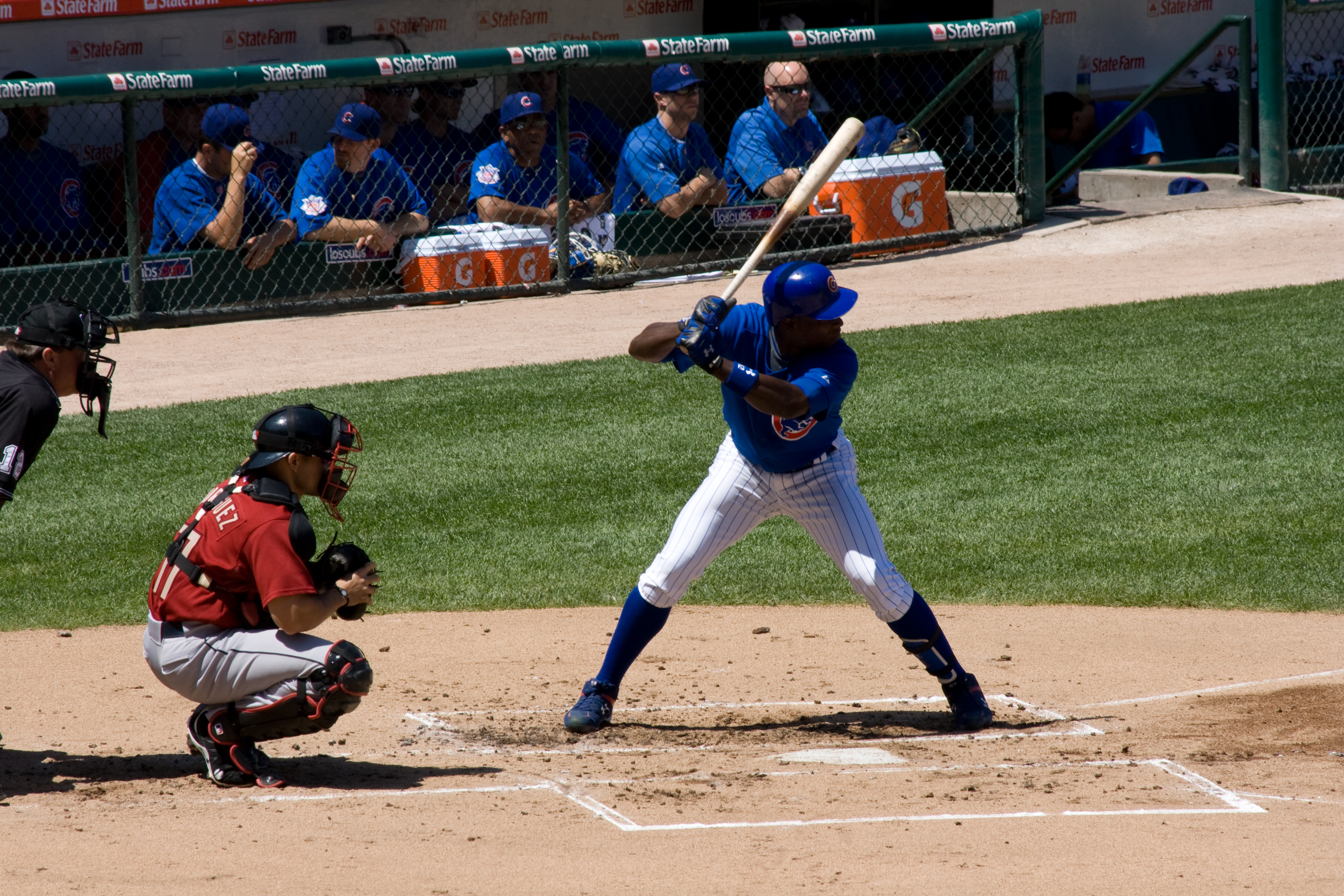
Soriano at bat with the Cubs in 2009

Soriano had gotten off to a quick start, hitting a solo home run in his first at bat of the 2009 season. Soriano also hit a game-tying solo home run off LaTroy Hawkins in the 8th inning in the second game of the young season. On April 11, Soriano hit a 2-run home run off of Carlos Villanueva in the top of the ninth giving the Cubs a 6 to 5 victory over rival Milwaukee. Comcast Sportsnet awarded Soriano with "Play of the Day". Soriano homered again, the very next day, on the first pitch he saw from Jeff Suppan, his 51st lead-off home run. On April 17 with one out in the bottom of the eighth, Soriano hit a two-run home run to give the Cubs an 8–7 lead over the St. Louis Cardinals. However, Soriano only hit .216 in the month of May.

In voting for the 2009 All-Star Game, Soriano was fourth among NL outfielders (2,692,994 votes), trailing Ryan Braun (4,138,559), Raúl Ibañez (4,053,355), and Carlos Beltrán (2,812,295).

Shortly before the All-Star break, manager Lou Piniella dropped Soriano in the batting order and made it clear that it was not a temporary change. For the first time in his career, Soriano seemed to accept not being a leadoff hitter and actually praised his manager for making the necessary decision, citing the fact that "I'm not doing my job."

The batting order change helped Soriano. In the first series after the All-Star break, he hit two go-ahead home runs against the Nationals. On July 27, he hit a walk-off grand slam against the Houston Astros during the 13th inning.

In September 2009, Soriano underwent arthroscopic surgery on his left knee.

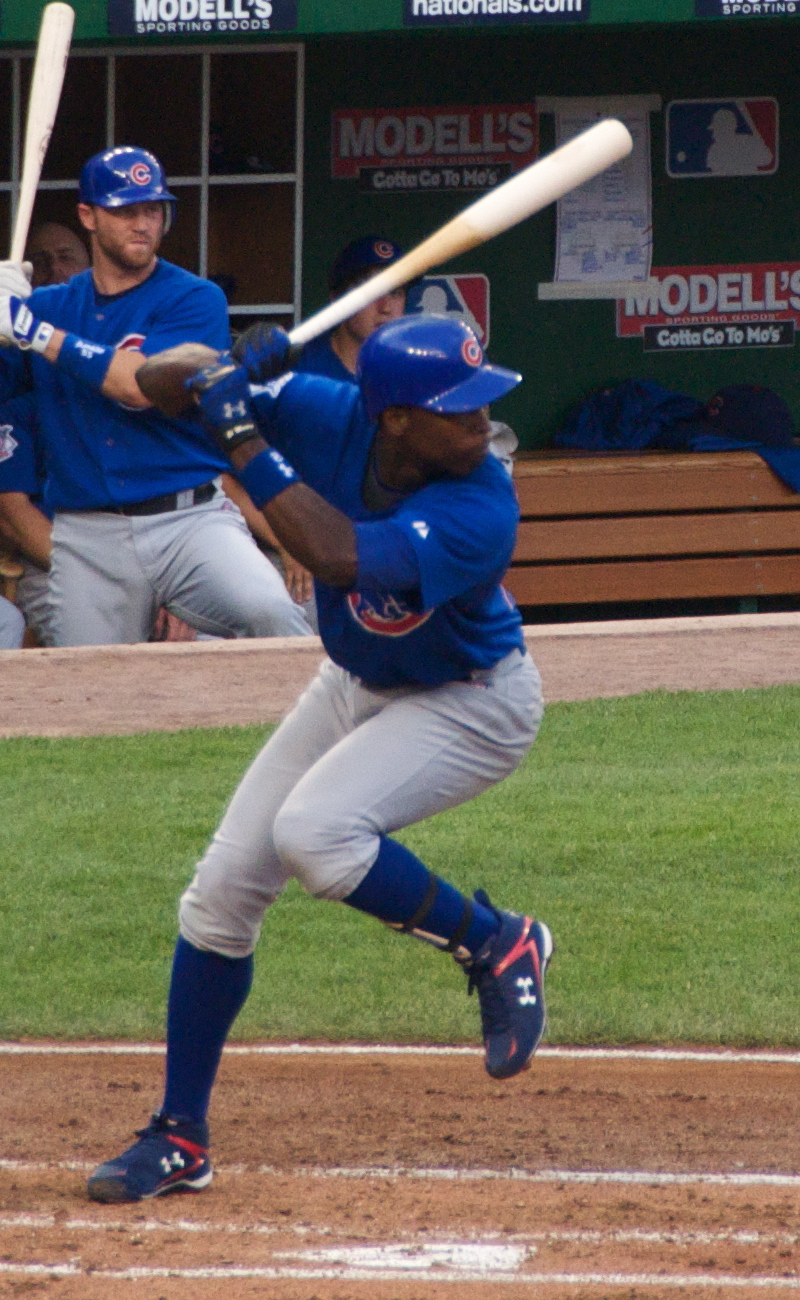
Alfonso Soriano batting for the Cubs in 2009

In 2009, Soriano led all major league left fielders in errors, with 11, and had the lowest fielding percentage among them (.950).

==== 2010 ====
After a poor season in 2009, Soriano was placed permanently in the 6th spot in the Cubs lineup, where he rebounded nicely, by playing in the most games(147 games) that season for the Cubs. He also collected 40 doubles, and 79 RBIs. On June 11, 2010, Soriano hit his 300th home run off of Jake Peavy. In 2010, on defense he led major league left fielders in errors, with 7, and had the lowest fielding percentage, at .968.

==== 2011 ====
In 2011, Soriano had a less than stellar year on defense and led in errors by a left fielder, with 7, and had the lowest fielding percentage, at .965. He batted .244, drove in 88 runs, and hit 26 home runs.

==== 2012 ====
2012 was Soriano's best year in some time, hitting 32 home runs, his best batting average in years (.262) and his personal best for RBIs (108), which ranked third in the National League.

In the field, he made only one error, which was also Soriano's personal best on the field.

==== 2013 ====
Soriano started the 2013 season with the Cubs by playing 93 games with a .254 average, 17 home runs, and 51 RBI. Soriano's batting average and home run production for the Cubs was especially strong in June and July, making him a hot commodity as the trading deadline approached.

=== Second stint with the New York Yankees (2013–2014) ===
==== Rest of 2013 ====
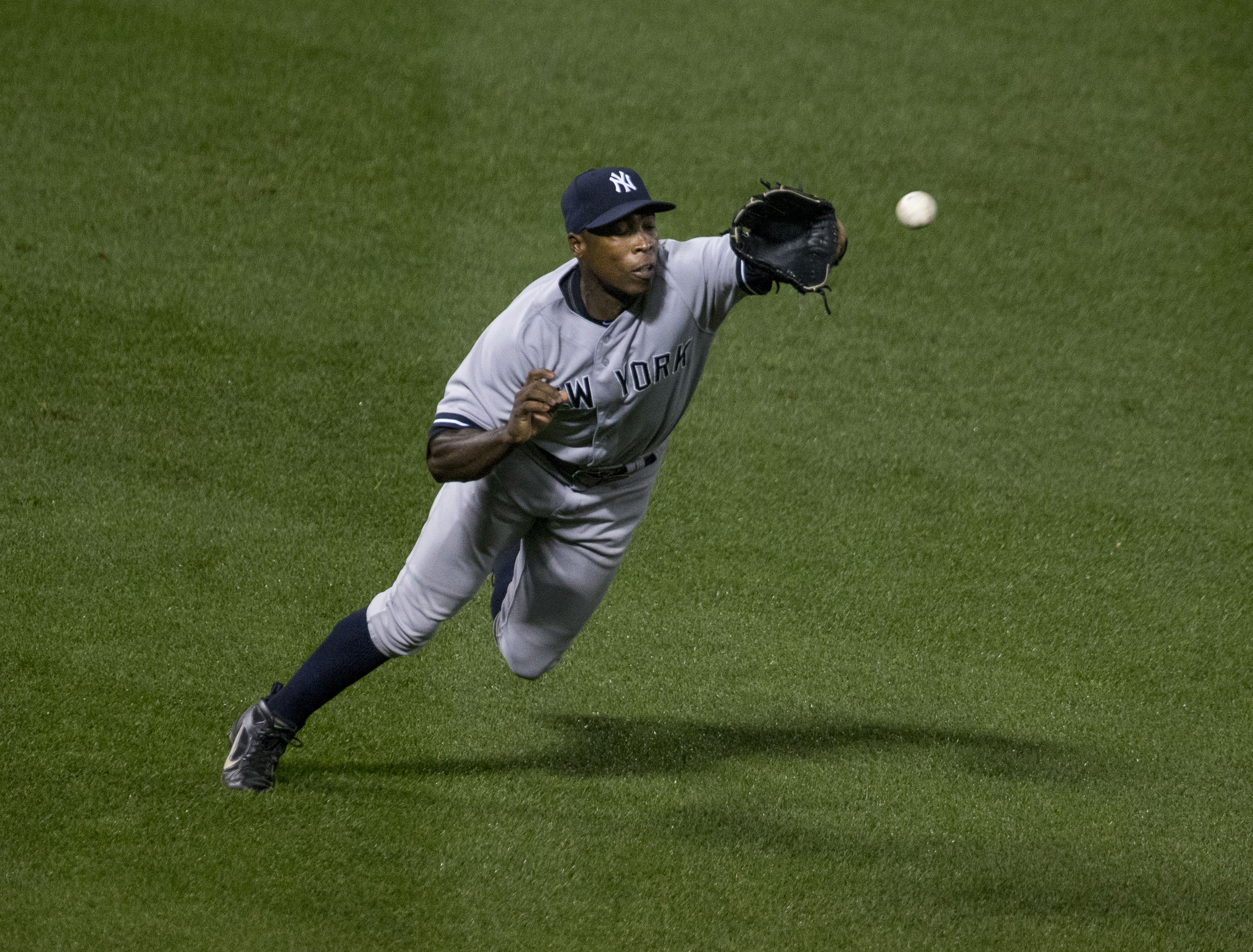
Alfonso Soriano makes a diving catch during a Yankees-Orioles game in September 2013

On July 26, 2013, the Cubs traded Soriano to the New York Yankees, who paid him $5 million prorated for 2013 and $5 million of the $18 million owed to him in 2014. The Cubs received pitcher Corey Black from the Single-A Tampa Yankees. On August 11, 2013, Soriano recorded his 2,000th career hit, a home run off of Detroit Tigers pitcher Justin Verlander.

On August 13, 2013, Soriano hit two home runs and had a career-high six RBIs. The next day, he broke his career high set the previous day by driving in seven runs. He became one of only three players in the live-ball era to drive in at least six runs in back-to-back games (the other two being Rusty Greer in 1997 and Geoff Jenkins in 2001). He also became just one of seven players to record 13 RBI in a two-game span, and fell just two RBI short of the all-time record set by former Yankee Tony Lazzeri.

From August 13 to 16, Soriano batted in 18 runs over four games, tying the Major League record for most RBI in four consecutive games. Soriano also recorded 13 hits during this stretch, becoming the only player in MLB history with 18 RBI and at least 12 hits in a four-game stretch. The other players who have recorded 18 RBI in four games are Jim Bottomley (St. Louis Cardinals, July 6–9, 1929), Lou Gehrig (New York Yankees, July 29–31, 1930), Tony Lazzeri (New York Yankees, May 21–24, 1936), Joe DiMaggio (New York Yankees, August 28—September 1, 1939), and Sammy Sosa (Chicago Cubs, August 8–11, 2002). Soriano was named the AL Player of the Week for August 12–18.

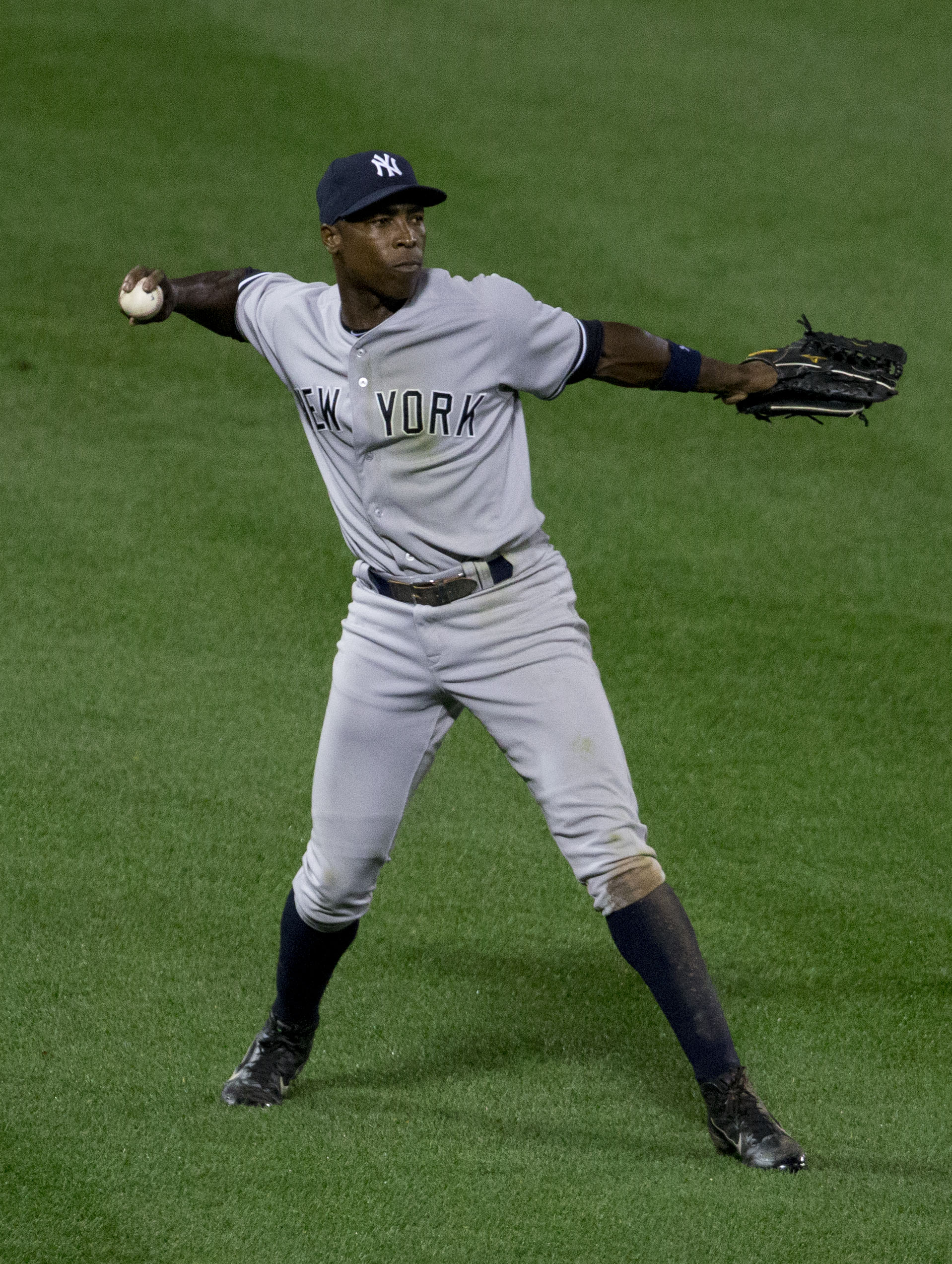
Alfonso Soriano in 2013

On August 27, Soriano hit two home runs, the second of which was the 400th of his career. For the rest of the 2013 season with the Yankees, Soriano played 58 games batting .256 with 17 home runs and 50 RBI. Overall in 2013, combined with the two teams, Soriano played 151 total games batting .255 with 34 home runs and 101 RBI.

==== 2014 ====
With the signings of Carlos Beltrán and Jacoby Ellsbury, Soriano started the 2014 season as the designated hitter and sometimes played at right field. His playing time became limited as he struggled at the plate. Soriano was designated for assignment by the Yankees on July 6, 2014. He was released on July 14. In 67 games, Soriano batted .221 with 6 home runs and 23 RBI.

=== Retirement ===
Soriano announced his retirement on November 4, 2014. He stated:

"I've lost the love and passion to play the game. Right now, my family is the most important thing. Although I consider myself in great shape, my mind is not focused on baseball."

Soriano's 412 career home runs put him in 53rd place on the all-time list at the time of his retirement.

=== Career awards and highlights ===
- 7× All-Star (2002–2008)
- 4× Silver Slugger Award (2002, 2004–2006)
- MLB All-Star Game MVP (2004)
- AL stolen base leader (2002)
- 4x 30-30 club (2002, 2003, 2005, 2006)
- 40-40 club (2006)

== Fielding ==
Soriano led all major league second basemen in errors every year from 2001 to 2005 (19 (tied), 23, 19, 23, and 21). In 2006, he was second in the major leagues of all left fielders in errors, with 11, but led all left fielders with 22 assists, 9 double plays, and a 2.29 range factor.

Games	GS	INN	TC	PO	A	E	DP	RF	FPCT
1,796	1,775	15,400.2	5,668	3,311	2,191	166	504	3.22	.971

== Personal life ==
Soriano's paternal family, the Guilleards, are of Haitian descent. His mother, Doña Andrea Soriano, is the sister of Hilario Soriano, a former catcher for the Tigres del Licey baseball team.

Soriano and his wife, Carmen Isis Eusebio, have three daughters (Alisis, Angeline, and Alisha) and three sons (Allen, Angel, and Alfonso Jr.).

== See also ==
- 30–30 club
- 40–40 club
- Haitians in the Dominican Republic
- List of Major League Baseball career home run leaders
- List of Major League Baseball career stolen bases leaders
- List of Major League Baseball annual runs scored leaders
- List of Major League Baseball annual stolen base leaders
- List of Major League Baseball single-game hits leaders
- List of Silver Slugger Award winners at second base
- List of Silver Slugger Award winners at outfield

Preceded by Manny Ramírez; Alex Rodriguez	American League Player of the Month; April, 2003; September, 2003	Succeeded by Edgar Martínez; Carlos Beltrán
Preceded by Prince Fielder	National League Player of the Month; June 2007	Succeeded by Ryan Braun
