= Don Nomura =

Japanese professional baseball agent (born 1957)

- Born: Donald Engel; May 17, 1957 (age 69); Chūō, Tokyo, Japan
- Education: St. Mary's Int'l; Chofu High School; Zama High School (graduated in 1975); California State Polytechnic University, Pomona (1975–1977)
- Occupation: Sports agent
- Employer(s): KDN Management, KDN Japan
- Known for: Enabling Hideo Nomo, Hideki Irabu and Alfonso Soriano to move from NPB to MLB; Masato Yoshii (NPB-MLB); Akinori Otsuka (NPB-MLB); Katsuhiro Maeda (NPB-MLB); Yutaka Enatsu (NPB-MLB); Jack Howell (MLB-NPB); Doug DeCinces (MLB-NPB); Ben Oglivie (MLB-NPB); Tony Barnette (MLB-NPB); Mac Suzuki (MLB-NPB); Yu Darvish (NPB-MLB); Hisashi Iwakuma (NPB-MLB); Kenta Maeda (NPB-MLB) and many others
- Parent(s): Sachiyo Nomura, born Yoshie Itō; Alvin George Engel; Katsuya Nomura (stepfather)

Don Katsuaki Nomura (団 野村, Dan Nomura; born Donald Engel, May 17, 1957) is a Japanese sports agent who primarily represents baseball players. He is best known for convincing Nippon Professional Baseball players Hideo Nomo and Alfonso Soriano to retire from the league to sign with Major League Baseball in the 1990s, as well as negotiating for Hideki Irabu to be sent to the New York Yankees like he requested instead of the San Diego Padres, which led to the NPB dissolving the reserve clause and paved the way for Japanese Baseball players playing in the MLB.

== Life before and during his baseball career ==
Nomura was born Donald Engel at St. Luke's International Hospital in Chūō, Tokyo, to a Japanese mother, Yoshie Itō and a Jewish American father, Alvin George Engel. His mother left the family when Don was six, leaving his father to care for him and his younger brother Kenneth. He attended St. Mary's International School, a private, English-speaking Catholic school in Tokyo, until he was kicked out for fighting at the age of 16. Nomura then attended Chofu High School, then transferred to Zama High School, where he played baseball and graduated in 1975. During this time, he began visiting his mother, who had changed her name to Sachiyo and married NPB catcher and manager Katsuya Nomura. After completing high school, Nomura enrolled at California State Polytechnic University in Pomona, California where he studied and played baseball from 1975–77.

In 1977, at the age of 21, the Japanese Home Ministry would no longer allow Nomura to hold a US-Japan dual citizenship, requiring him to choose one. He chose Japanese citizenship. Nomura's decision was influenced by a NPB restriction that allowed only two foreign players per team at the time. He then assumed the name Katsuaki Itō (Itou Katsuaki) until his stepfather adopted him that same year, at which time he took the name Don Katsuki Nomura. Commenting on his new Japanese name, Nomura remarked, "It helped me get into places and meet people". He began playing on a minor league team affiliated with the Yakult Swallows the next year as a utility infielder.

== Life after his baseball career ==
In 1981, he was released after playing four seasons with the team because of poor performance. The same year, Nomura's 62-year-old father, Alvin Engel, committed suicide in Hawaii via carbon monoxide poisoning. Nomura traveled to Hawaii to pick up his father's ashes and return them to Japan.

In December of the same year, Nomura moved to Los Angeles with his new wife. There he worked a series of odd jobs including a non-paying scout for the Milwaukee Brewers, travel agent, janitor, waiter, driver, liquor store clerk, tour coordinator, translator and so on. For a time, Nomura was forced to send his wife and infant daughter back to Japan while he lived in his car in Los Angeles because of his poor financial state. By 1985, he had saved enough money to rent an apartment and bring his family back to L.A. Nomura then converted $1,000 to $41,000 while playing baccarat in Las Vegas. The money helped him to buy an apartment building in L.A. for $250,000 that he later sold for $400,000.

In 1989, Nomura borrowed money to buy 50% of the Salinas Spurs, an unaffiliated Class-A baseball team in the California League. NPB teams sent their high school draftees to Nomura's Spurs for training. As a teenager, baseball player Mac Suzuki worked in the team's clubhouse until he began playing with the Spurs in 1992. That year, Suzuki became Nomura's first client when he signed him to a personal representation contract. Nomura then negotiated with the Seattle Mariners and later earned Suzuki a million-dollar signing bonus. In 1992, Nomura sold the Spurs to a group in San Bernardino. He founded the Los Angeles-based company KDN Sports, Inc. and became a full-time sports agent.

In 1994 Nomura discovered a loophole in the NPB player contract and working agreement between MLB and NPB. According to the 1967 working agreement between MLB and NPB, NPB players could not sign a contract with an MLB team until they reached free agency after 10 years of service or unless their team sold their contract to an MLB team. However, a player who "voluntarily retired" from NPB was no longer bound to their NPB team outside Japan and was free to sign overseas without violating the working agreement.

After the 1994 season Nomura assisted star NPB pitcher Hideo Nomo in testing the loophole. After failing to reach a contract agreement with the Kintetsu Buffaloes, Nomo retired from NPB and signed with the Los Angeles Dodgers in 1995.

In 1998 he represented Hideki Irabu, whose contract was sold by the Chiba Lotte Marines to the San Diego Padres. Irabu stated that he would only play for the New York Yankees, and refused to sign with the Padres. The Padres traded the rights to Irabu to the Yankees, where he finally made his MLB debut. Despite Irabu's refusal to sign with the Padres, other teams were unhappy that they didn't get the chance to bid on Irabu.

In 1998, the NPB contract loophole was tested again when Nomura advised Hiroshima Carp player Alfonso Soriano of the Dominican Republic who wished to move to MLB. Although NPB had amended the player contract to prohibit retired players from signing overseas, they had inadvertently failed to notify MLB of the change as required by the working agreement. After failing to reach a contract agreement with the Carp, Soriano declared his retirement as Nomo had three years before. This decision resulted in the Carp management suing Nomura for $100,000 in damages as well as threatening legal action against any MLB ball club that negotiated with Soriano. However, MLB eventually ruled that Soriano could be classified as a free agent. The Carp gave up pursuing legal action, and the suit with Nomura was later settled. Soriano signed with the New York Yankees for $3.1 million over four years, a vast improvement over the $40,000 a year he was offered from the Carp.

The incidents with Nomo, Irabu, and Soriano motivated NPB and MLB to abolish the working agreement and replace it with the current posting system. This led to a wave of star players leaving NPB during their prime to play in the United States, in addition to the dozens of players who moved to the US after becoming free agents.

== Personal life ==
Nomura's half brother is former NPB player and current Tohoku Rakuten Golden Eagles coach Katsunori Nomura. He attended Zama High School and afterwards played under a coach named Scott Thompson. One of his mentors, practice player at Kindai High school Osaka, Yoshio Toyoda, is another important person in Nomura's life.

== Sources ==
- Whiting, Robert (April 2004). The Meaning of Ichiro. Warner Books. ISBN 0-446-53192-8.
