= Seisen International School =

Coordinates: 35.622646°N 139.639986°E

- The school in 2021
- 12-15 Yoga 1-chome, Setagaya, Tokyo 158-0097; Tokyo, Japan

Information
- Type: International School
- Motto: Ad Finem Fidelis (Faithful Until the End)
- Established: 1962; 64 years ago
- Founder: María Asunción Lecubarri y de Arri
- School district: Setagaya, Tokyo
- Head of school: Colette Rogers
- Grades: K-12
- Enrollment: 705
- Colours: Maroon and Navy
- Mascot: Phoenix
- Affiliation: Catholic
- Website: Seisen International School Official website

Seisen International School (SIS) is an all-girls Catholic school located in Setagaya, in Tokyo, Japan. Students and faculty from over sixty countries are represented at Seisen, with English being the main language of instruction. It offers the International Baccalaureate Diploma Programme for grades 11 and 12. It is accredited by the Ministry of Education, Culture, Sports, Science and Technology (Japan), New England Association of Schools and Colleges and the Council of International Schools. It teaches Montessori kindergarten (coed, ages 2–6) and grades 1-12 (girls only, ages 6–18).

According to the Good Schools Guide International, "The school is popular and has a good reputation."

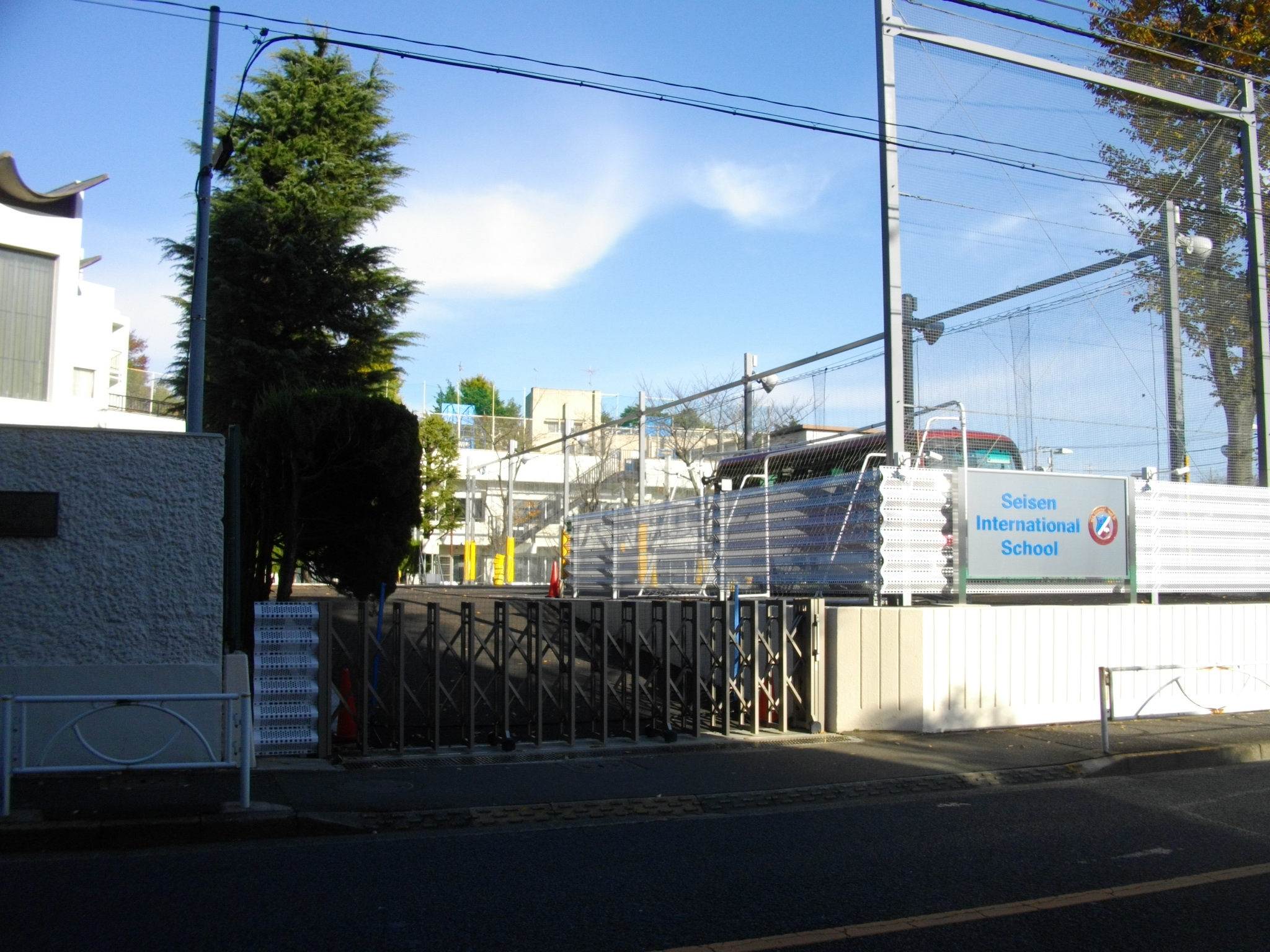
The school in 2014

According to Anne-Marie De Mejía, Seisen International School provides a specifically Christian orientation in its programmes.

== History ==
The school was founded in 1949 by Sister María Asunción Lecubarri from the Handmaids of the Sacred Heart of Jesus in response to requests from United States Air Force families seeking an education for their children. The school began as a kindergarten in 1949 with four American students, moved to Gotanda in 1962 with 70 students and added a first grade. By 1970, the school was up to grade 9 and in 1973, a year after Seisen was moved to the present location in Yoga, the school was extended to include Grade 12.

CIS International Schools Directory 2009/10, mentions that Seisen has approximately 700 students from around 60 nations.

== Campus overview ==
There are 35 general classrooms, 3 indoor playrooms, a multipurpose room and a kindergarten hall. The facilities also include three science laboratories (for biology, chemistry, and physics classes), a cafeteria, a drama room, a music room, an art room, a pottery room, a media center, two design technology classrooms equipped with 3D printers, laser cutters, woodworking and other product design equipment, and an Information Technology room. The school has an infirmary and a full-time nurse on duty. The facilities also include a convent building and a chapel. In 2013, a new futsal field was added to expand the ever-growing Seisen campus, as well as to provide further opportunities for physical exercise, including PE classes and extracurriculars.

The school's libraries together have a collection of more than 18,000 volumes and subscribe to 65 periodicals and 6 newspapers. The media center houses filmstrips, records, cassettes, maps, transparencies, and audiovisual equipment.

Sports facilities include tennis courts, three playgrounds, a kindergarten play area (with sandbox and play equipment), and a full-size gymnasium with a locker room. The swimming pool at St. Mary's International School is used for the swimming team.

== Notable alumni ==
- CL, a popular female Korean pop singer from the group 2ne1.
- Hikaru Utada, a popular Japanese pop singer, who later transferred to the American School in Japan.
- Lisa, a Japanese singer, songwriter and producer, and member of the group M-Flo.
- Maya, a member of the popular Japanese girl group XG.

== See also ==
- List of high schools in Tokyo
