= Beni discography =

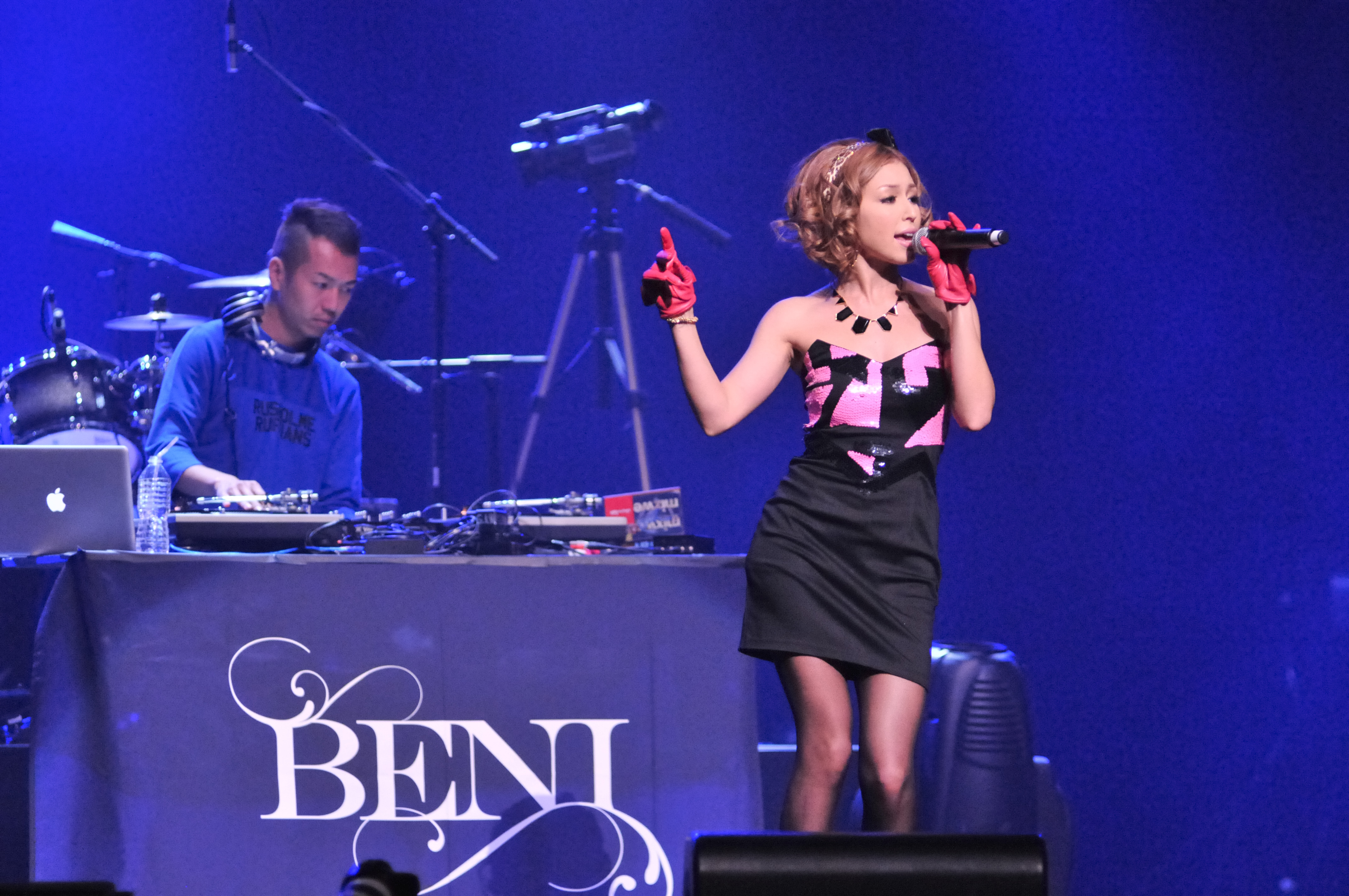
- Beni performing at Anime Expo 2010
- Studio albums: 13
- Live albums: 6
- Compilation albums: 2
- Tribute albums: 3
- Singles: 26

The discography of Japanese-American musician Beni consists of thirteen studio albums, two compilation albums, six live albums and three cover albums and twenty-six singles. Beni debuted in 2003 as a member of the Pony Canyon idol group Bishōjo Club 21 under the name Beni Arashiro, and in 2004 made her solo debut with Avex Trax.

In 2008, Beni released the most commercially successful song of her career when she collaborated with rapper Dohzi-T on his song "Mō Ichi do...". The song became a million-certified single by the Recording Industry Association of Japan. During this period, she changed her stage name to the mononym Beni, and signed with Universal Music Japan sublabel Nayutawave Records. Her first studio album with Universal, Bitter & Sweet (2009), was certified gold by the RIAJ.

In 2012, Beni released Covers, an album featuring covers of Japanese songs sung in English, such as Exile's "Ti Amo". The album became the most successful in her career, and spawned two sequels, Covers 2 (2012) and Covers 3 (2013).

== Studio albums ==
List of albums, with selected chart positions
Title	Album details	Peak positions	Sales (JPN) (Note: Sales provided by Oricon database and are rounded to the nearest thousand copies.)	Certifications
Title	Album details	JPN	Sales (JPN)	Certifications
Beni	As Beni Arashiro; Released: February 9, 2005 (JPN); Label: Avex Trax; Formats: CD, CD/DVD, digital download	14	25,000	
Girl 2 Lady	As Beni Arashiro; Released: February 22, 2006 (JPN); Label: Avex Trax; Formats: CD, CD/DVD, digital download	93	4,000	
Gem	As Beni Arashiro; Released: April 24, 2007 (JPN); Label: Avex Trax; Formats: CD, CD/DVD, digital download	125	2,000	
Bitter & Sweet	Released: September 2, 2009; Label: Nayutawave; Formats: CD, CD+DVD, digital download, streaming	5	110,000	RIAJ: Gold
Lovebox	Released: June 2, 2010; Label: Nayutawave; Formats: CD, CD+DVD, digital download, streaming	1	57,000	
Jewel	Released: December 8, 2010; Label: Nayutawave; Formats: CD, CD+DVD, digital download, streaming	11	29,000	
Fortune	Released: November 2, 2011; Label: Nayutawave; Formats: CD, CD+DVD, digital download, streaming	5	24,000	
Red	Released: July 31, 2013; Label: Nayutawave; Formats: CD, CD+DVD, digital download, streaming	7	19,000	
Undress	Released: November 25, 2015; Label: EMI; Formats: CD, CD/DVD, digital download, streaming	14	10,000	
Shiki Uta: Summer	Released: June 29, 2016; Label: EMI; Formats: CD, CD+DVD, digital download, streaming	22		
Cinematic	Released: November 28, 2018; Label: Universal Sigma; Formats: CD, CD+DVD, digital download, streaming	36	2,000	
Made in Love	As Beni Daniels; Released: September 30, 2020; Label: Independent; Formats: Digital download, streaming	—		
Dreamin'	Released: October 28, 2026; Label: USM Japan; Formats: CD, CD+Blu-ray, digital download, streaming	57		

== Compilation albums ==
List of albums, with selected chart positions
Title	Album details	Peak positions	Sales (JPN)
Title	Album details	JPN	Sales (JPN)
Chapter One: Complete Collection	As Beni Arashiro; Released: March 5, 2008 (JPN); Label: Avex Trax; Formats: CD, CD/DVD, digital download	166	1,000
Best: All Singles & Covers Hits	Released: June 11, 2014; Label: EMI Records; Formats: 2CD, 2CD/DVD, digital download	3	54,000

== Cover albums ==
List of albums, with selected chart positions
Title	Album details	Peak positions	Sales (JPN)	Certifications
Title	Album details	JPN	Sales (JPN)	Certifications
Covers	Released: March 21, 2012; Label: Nayutawave; Formats: CD, CD/DVD, digital download	2	235,000	RIAJ: Platinum
Covers: 2	Released: November 7, 2012; Label: Nayutawave; Formats: CD, CD/DVD, digital download	5	156,000	RIAJ: Platinum
Covers: 3	Released: December 18, 2013; Label: Nayutawave; Formats: CD, CD/DVD, digital download	2	65,000	RIAJ: Gold
Covers the City	Released: September 13, 2017; Label: Nayutawave; Formats: CD, CD/DVD, digital download	11	6,000	

== Live albums ==
List of albums, with selected chart positions
Title	Album details	Peak positions	Sales (JPN)
Title	Album details	JPN	Sales (JPN)
Bitter & Sweet Release Tour Final	Released: March 10, 2010; Label: Nayutawave; Formats: CD/DVD, digital download	50	6,000
Lovebox Live Tour	Released: March 16, 2011; Label: Nayutawave; Formats: CD/DVD, digital download	48	4,000
Jewel Concert Tour	Released: January 25, 2012; Label: Nayutawave; Formats: CD/DVD, digital download	42	4,000
MTV Unplugged	Released: May 23, 2012; Label: Nayutawave; Formats: CD/DVD, digital download	39	5,000
Fortune Tour	Released: December 19, 2012; Label: Nayutawave; Formats: CD/DVD, digital download	50	4,000
Beni Red Live Tour 2013: Tour Final 2013.10.06 at Zepp Diver City	Released: December 18, 2013; Label: Nayutawave; Formats: CD/DVD, digital download	34	3,000

== Singles ==
=== As a lead artist ===
List of singles, with selected chart positions
Title	Year	Peak chart positions		Sales (JPN)	Certifications	Album
Title	Year	Oricon Singles Charts	Billboard Japan Hot 100 (Note: Sources for chart positions are as follows: "Mellow Parade", "Mō Ichido", "Mō Nido to", "Kiss Kiss Kiss", "Zutto Futari de", "Sign", "Yurayura", "Heaven's Door", "2Face", "Suki Dakara", "Eien", "Ti Amo", "Satsuki Ame", "Our Sky", "Konayuki", "Mō Nido to Rebirth".)	Sales (JPN)	Certifications	Album
"Harmony" (as Beni Arashiro)	2004	26	—	14,000		Beni
"Infinite..." (as Beni Arashiro)	2004	24	—	10,000		Beni
"Here Alone" (as Beni Arashiro)	2004	14	—	35,000		Beni
"Miracle" (as Beni Arashiro)	2005	98	—	1,000		Beni
"Hikari no Kazu Dake Glamorous" (光の数だけグラマラス; "Only as Glamorous as the Number of Lights") (as Beni Arashiro)	2005	40	—	4,000		Girl 2 Lady
"Cherish" (as Beni Arashiro)	2005	96	—	1,000		Girl 2 Lady
"How Are U" (as Beni Arashiro)	2006	—	—			Gem
"Luna" (as Beni Arashiro)	2007	77	—	3,000		Gem
"Mō Nido to..." (もう二度と…; "Again")	2008	20	—	14,000	RIAJ (cellphone): Gold	Bitter & Sweet
"Kiss Kiss Kiss"	2009	40	58	5,000	RIAJ (cellphone): Gold	Bitter & Sweet
"Koi Kogarete" (恋焦がれて; "Yearning")	2009	70	— (Note: Charted at number 63 on the Hot Single Sales subchart.)	2,000		Bitter & Sweet
"Zutto Futari de" (ずっと二人で; "Us, Always")	2009	67	89	2,000	RIAJ (cellphone): Gold	Bitter & Sweet
"Kira Kira" ("Sparkling")	2009	94	—	1,000		Bitter & Sweet
"Sign" (サイン, Sain)	2010	50	47	2,000		Lovebox
"Bye Bye"	2010	57	— (Note: Charted at number 60 on the Hot Single Sales subchart.)	1,000		Lovebox
"Gimme Gimme" (ギミギミ♥, Gimigimi)	2010	20	—	5,000		Lovebox
"Yurayura" (ユラユラ; "Swaying")	2010	20	25	5,000		Lovebox
"Heaven's Door"	2010	49	40	3,000		Jewel
"2Face"	2010	68	67	2,000		Jewel
"Suki Dakara" (好きだから。; "Because I Love You.")	2011	46	41	2,000	RIAJ (download): Gold	Fortune
"Koe o Kikasete" (声を聞かせて; "Let Me Hear Your Voice")	2011	49	— (Note: Charted at number 55 on the Hot Single Sales subchart.)	1,000		Fortune
"Crazy Girl"	2011	49	—	1,000		Fortune
"Darlin'"	2011	74	— (Note: Charted at number 67 on the Adult Contemporary Airplay chart.)	1,000		Fortune
"Eien" (永遠; "Forever")	2012	75	55	1,000	RIAJ (download): Gold	Red
"Satsuki Ame" (さつきあめ; "Early Summer Rain")	2013	41	63	4,000		Red
"Our Sky"	2013	56	70	1,000		Red
"Konayuki" (粉雪; "Powder Snow")	2013	121	21	1,000		Covers: 3
"Forever" (フォエバ, Foeba)	2015	80	— (Note: Charted at number 80 on the Radio Songs sub-chart and at number 86 on the Hot Single Sales sub-chart.)	1,000		Undress
"—" denotes items that did not chart, or were released before the creation of the Billboard Japan Hot 100 in 2008.

=== As a featured artist ===
List of singles, with selected chart positions
Title	Year	Peak chart positions		Sales (JPN)	Certifications	Album
Title	Year	Oricon Singles Charts	Billboard Japan Hot 100	Sales (JPN)	Certifications	Album
"Mō Ichi do..." (もう一度…; "Again") (Dohzi-T featuring Beni)	2008	6	6	83,000	RIAJ (ringtone): Million; RIAJ (cellphone): 2× Platinum; RIAJ (physical): Gold; RIAJ (PC): Gold	12 Love Stories
"The Boy Is Mine" (Tynisha Keli featuring Beni)	2009	—	—			The Chronicles of TK

=== Promotional singles ===
List of promotional singles with selected chart positions
Title	Year	Peak chart positions	Album
Title	Year	Billboard Japan Hot 100	Album
"Flash Flash" (as Beni Arashiro)	2005	—	Girl 2 Lady
"Mellow Parade" (as Beni Arashiro)	2008	57	Chapter One
"Hitomi Tojite" (瞳とじて; "Close Your Eyes")	2010	— (Note: Charted at number 71 on the Adult Contemporary Airplay chart.)	Lovebox
"Superstar"	2009	—	Yesterday Once More: Tribute to the Carpenters
"Ti Amo"	2012	84	Covers
"Utautai no Ballad" (歌うたいのバラッド; "Singer's Ballad")	2012	— (Note: Charted at number 34 on the Adult Contemporary Airplay chart.)	Covers: 2
"Shiroi Koibito-tachi" (白い恋人達; "Lovers in White")	2012	—	Covers: 2
"I Love You"	2012	—	Covers: 2
"AM 2:00"	2013	—	Red
"Ai Uta" (愛唄; "Love Song")	2013	—	Covers: 3
"Two Hearts"	2013	—	Non-album single
"Thank You." (サンキュ., Sankyu.)	2014	—	Watashi to Dorikamu: Dreams Come True 25th Best Covers
"Mō Nido to... Rebirth"	2014	72	Best
"Fun Fun Christmas"	2014	—	Francfranc presents Fun Fun Christmas: The Gifts
"Natsu no Omoide"	2016	—	Shiki Uta: Summer
"Summer Lovers"	2016	—	Shiki Uta: Summer
"Mienai Start"	2017	—	Non-album single
"—" denotes items that did not chart, or were released before the creation of the Billboard Japan Hot 100 in 2008.

=== Other charted songs ===
List of songs with selected chart positions
Title	Year	Peak chart positions	Album
Title	Year	RIAJ Digital Track Chart (Note: The RIAJ Digital Track Chart is a depreciated chart that ran from 2009 until mid 2012 and tracked full-length cellphone downloads.) (Note: Sources for chart positions are as follows: "Dakishimete", "Last Song".)	Album
"Dakishimete" (抱きしめて; "Hold Me") (Beni featuring Dohzi-T)	2009	9	Bitter & Sweet
"Last Song"	2011	75	Fortune

== Other appearances ==
List of non-studio album or guest appearances that feature Beni
Title	Year	Album
"Harmony (Spring Remix)"	2005	Gazen Parapara!! Presents Super J-Euro Best
"Call Me, Beep Me! (Japanese Edit Ver.)"	2005	Kim Possible Soundtrack (Japanese Edition)
"Here Alone (Overhead Champion Remix)"	2005	Super Best Trance Presents Beat!
"Here Alone (live)"	2005	A-Nation '05 Best Hit Live
"Summer Days" (Dohzi-T featuring Beni Arashiro)	2007	One Mic
"Late Night" (Equip featuring Beni)	2007	For Your Love
"By My Side" (Equip featuring Beni)	2007	For Your Love
"Star in My Sky" (Makai featuring Beni)	2008	Stars
"Setogiwa no Birthday" (瀬戸際のBirthday; "Important Birthday") (Da Bubblegum Brothers featuring Beni)	2008	Da Bubblegum Brothers Show: Tariri Hongan
"Finally" (Makai featuring Beni)	2009	Legend
"L.O.T. (Love or Truth)"	2009	Tribute: Maison de M-Flo
"Heaven" (Dohzi-T featuring Beni)	2009	4 Ever
"Star in My Sky (Kaaltechs Remix)" (Makai featuring Beni)	2010	Virtual Party
"Kiss Kiss Kiss (Lady Bird Lovers Remix)"	2010	Ai no Uta Lovers Remix
"Zutto Futari de (Lady Bird Winter Remix)"	2010	Ai no Uta Winter Remix
"Mō Ichi do 2011" (Dohzi-T featuring Beni)	2011	10th Anniversary Best
"L.O.V.E" (D.I featuring Beni)	2011	Room 106
"Doko Made mo..." (どこまでも; "Wherever") (Dohzi-T featuring Beni)	2011	12 Love Stories 2
"Let Me Love You (Until You Learn to Love Yourself)" (Ne-Yo featuring Beni)	2012	R.E.D. (Japanese Limited Edition)
"Magic" (Masayuki Suzuki featuring Beni)	2013	Open Sesame
"Ue o Muite Arukō" (上を向いて歩こう; "I Look Up as I Walk") (Sérgio Mendes featuring Beni)	2013	Rendez-Vous
"When You Wish upon a Star" (Mary J. Blige featuring Beni)	2013	A Mary Christmas (Japanese Edition)
