= Chapter One: Complete Collection =

Chapter One ~complete collection~

Greatest hits album by Beni Arashiro
- Released: 2008/3/5
- Genre: J-pop
- Label: Avex Trax

Beni Arashiro chronology
GEM (2007)	Chapter One ~complete collection~ (2008)	Bitter & Sweet (2009)

Alternative Cover
- CD + DVD

Chapter One ~Complete Collection~ is a greatest hit album from Beni Arashiro under label Avex Trax. This was her first and also her last greatest hit album she released as Beni Arashiro before she switched to label Universal Music Japan and stage name BENI. The last 3 tracks are new songs which were originally going to be released as a single. However the single was cancelled and listed on this album due to Beni's label switch. Southern Star is a CM theme song for Orion Beer, BIG BANG is theme song for Mainichi Housou TV's broadcast of the Koushien Bowl theme song and Mellow Parade is a movie theme for the movie called Bra bra Ban ban which featured Beni herself. The DVD contains all her PVs and a First Live Digest.

== Track listing ==
1. Harmony
2. Infinite...
3. Here Alone
4. Miracle
5. Give me Up
6. Hikari no Kazu dake Glamorous (光の数だけグラマラス;As Glamorous as the number of Lights)
7. THE POWER
8. CALL ME, BEEP ME!
9. Cherish
10. GOAL
11. FLASH FLASH (feat. KOHEI JAPAN)
12. How Are U?
13. Luna
14. Southern Star
15. Mellow Parade
16. BIG BANG

=== DVD ===
1. Harmony PV
2. Infinite.. PV
3. Here alone PV
4. Miracle PV
5. Hikari no kazu dake GLAMEROUS (光の数だけグラマラス;As Glamerous as the number of Lights)
6. Cherish
7. How Are U?
8. Luna

■First LIVE digest 2007

1. BAD GIRL
2. 光の数だけグラマラス
3. Eternal flame
4. Gems
5. Luna
6. Infinite...
7. Here Alone
8. How Are U ?
9. Give Me Up
