= Bitter & Sweet Release Tour Final =

Bitter&Sweet Release Tour Final

Live album by BENI
- Released: March 10, 2010
- Recorded: 2009–2010
- Genres: Pop, R&B
- Label: Nayutawave Records

BENI chronology
Bitter & Sweet (2009)	Bitter&Sweet Release Tour Final (2010)	Lovebox (2010)

Bitter & Sweet Release Tour Final is the first live CD by singer Beni. The album contains a DVD with performed songs at the Akasaka Blitz hall on 15 December 2009.

== Track list: DVD ==
No.	Title	Length
1.	"Bitter & Sweet Intro"
2.	"STAY"
3.	"Stardust"
4.	"Anything Goes!!"
5.	"Koi Kogarete (恋焦がれて, Yearning for Love)"
6.	"KIRA☆KIRA☆"
7.	"Kiss Kiss Kiss"
8.	"Shinjisasete (信じさせて, Make Me Believe)"
9.	"Dakishimete feat. Dohzi-T (抱きしめて feat. 童子-T, Hold Me)"
10.	"Zutto Futari de (Piano version) (ずっと二人で, Always Together)"
11.	"SAKURAZAKA -桜坂- （Piano Version）"
12.	"nice & slow"
13.	"GO ON"
14.	"Beautiful World"
15.	"Mō Nido to... (もう二度と・・・, Never Again...)"
16.	"Sign (サイン, Sain)"
17.	"Zutto Futari de DJ HASEBE REMIX"

== Track list: CD ==
No.	Title	Length
1.	"stardust"
2.	"Anything Goes!!"
3.	"Koi Kogarete"
4.	"KIRA☆KIRA☆"
5.	"Kiss Kiss Kiss"
6.	"Dakishimete feat. Dohzi-T"
7.	"Zutto Futari de (Piano Version)"
8.	"SAKURAZAKA -桜坂- （Piano Version）"
9.	"nice & slow"
10.	"GO ON"
11.	"Mou Nido To..."
12.	"Sign"

== Charts ==
Release	Chart	Peak Position	First Week Sales	Sales Total	Chart Run
March 10, 2010	Oricon Daily Charts	36		4,494	2 weeks
March 10, 2010	Oricon Weekly Charts	50	3,277	4,494	2 weeks
March 10, 2010	Oricon Monthly Charts			4,494	2 weeks
March 10, 2010	Oricon Yearly Charts			4,494	2 weeks
