= Lovebox Live Tour =

Live album by BENI
- Released: March 16, 2011
- Recorded: 2010
- Genres: Pop, R&B
- Label: Nayutawave Records

BENI chronology
Jewel (2010)	Lovebox Live Tour (2011)	Fortune (2011)

Lovebox Live Tour is the second live CD by singer Beni. The album contains a bonus song named "ONLY ONE" and is the insert song for the movie "ランウェイ☆ビート" (Runway Beat). This release also contains a DVD that contains live footage of Beni's tour on 4 November 2010 in Zepp Tokyo hall.

== Track list: DVD ==
No.	Title	Length
1.	"Lovebox Intro"
2.	"Yura Yura (ユラユラ, Swaying)"
3.	"Stardust"
4.	"Bye Bye"
5.	"Koi Kogarete (恋焦がれて, Yearning for Love)"
6.	"Mō Nido to... (もう二度と・・・, Never Again...)"
7.	"a million jewels"
8.	"Hitomi Tojite (瞳とじて, Close Your Eyes)"
9.	"Kimi ja Nakya (君じゃなきゃ, Got to Be You)"
10.	"Sign (サイン, Sain)"
11.	"Zutto Futari de (ずっと二人で, Always Together)"
12.	"MOVE"
13.	"break the rules"
14.	"Kiss Kiss Kiss"
15.	"Gimme Gimme (ギミギミ♥, Gimme Gimme)"
16.	"Message"
17.	"KIRA☆KIRA☆"

== Track list: CD ==
No.	Title	Length
1.	"Yura Yura"
2.	"bye bye"
3.	"Koi Kogarete"
4.	"Mō Nido to..."
5.	"SIGN"
6.	"Zutto Futari de"
7.	"Kiss Kiss Kiss"
8.	"Gimme Gimme"

== Charts ==
Release	Chart	Peak Position	First Week Sales	Sales Total	Chart Run
March 10, 2010	Oricon Daily Charts	-		1,763	1 week
March 10, 2010	Oricon Weekly Charts	48	1,763	1,763	1 week
March 10, 2010	Oricon Monthly Charts			1,763	1 week
March 10, 2010	Oricon Yearly Charts			1,763	1 week
