= Jewel Concert Tour =

Live album by Beni
- Released: January 25, 2012
- Recorded: 2011
- Genres: Pop, R&B
- Label: Nayutawave Records

Beni chronology
Fortune (2011)	Jewel Concert Tour (2012)	Covers (2012)

Jewel Concert Tour is the third live CD by singer Beni. The album was released on 25 January 2012 along with her single "Eien". The DVD contains footage of the concert on 10 July 2011 in the Tokyo Dome City Hall.

== Track list: DVD ==
No.	Title	Length
1.	"Jewel Intro"
2.	"2FACE"
3.	"Toki wo Tomete (トキヲトメテ, Stop Time)"
4.	"Lovin' U"
5.	"Don't let Go"
6.	"Dakishimete (抱きしめて, Hold me)"
7.	"GO ON"
8.	"Kiss Kiss Kiss"
9.	"KIRA☆KIRA☆"
10.	"Anything Goes"
11.	"Wasurenai Ne (忘れないでね, Don't Forget)"
12.	"Kimi to Nara (君となら, If I'm With you)"
13.	"Heaven's Door"
14.	"Heart Breaker"
15.	"First Time"
16.	"See U Again"
17.	"stardust"
18.	"Yura Yura (ユラユラ, Swaying)"
19.	"Mō Nido to... (もう二度と・・・, Never Again...)"
20.	"Smile"

== Track list: CD ==
No.	Title	Length
1.	"2FACE"
2.	"Toki Wo Tomete"
3.	"Lovin' U"
4.	"Don't let Go"
5.	"Wasurenai Ne"
6.	"Kimi to Nara"
7.	"Heaven's Door"
8.	"Heartbreaker"
9.	"First Time"
10.	"See U Again"
11.	"Smile"

== Charts ==
Release	Chart	Peak Position	First Week Sales	Sales Total	Chart Run
January 25, 2012	Oricon Daily Charts	26		2,800	1 week*
January 25, 2012	Oricon Weekly Charts	42	2,800	2,800	1 week*
January 25, 2012	Oricon Monthly Charts			2,800	1 week*
January 25, 2012	Oricon Yearly Charts			2,800	1 week*
