= Lovebox (Beni album) =

Studio album by Beni
- Released: June 2, 2010
- Recorded: 2009–2010
- Genre: R&B
- Length: 58:56
- Language: Japanese
- Label: Nayutawave Records
- Producer: Akira Terabayashi (exec), 3rd Productions, Daisuke "D.I" Imai, STY for Digz, Inc., Yanagiman

Beni chronology
Bitter & Sweet Release Tour Final (2010)	Lovebox (2010)	Jewel (2010)

Alternative cover
- Limited CD+DVD cover

Singles from Lovebox
- 1. "Sign" Released: January 20, 2010; 2. "Bye Bye" Released: March 10, 2010; 3. "Yurayura/Gimme Gimme" Released: May 5, 2010

Lovebox is Beni's fifth studio album, and second original album under the mononym Beni released through Nayutawave Records. It was released on June 2, 2010. Natuyawave describes the album as "fully loaded with different feelings of love: happy love, painful love..."

== Background ==
The album was released only nine months after her debut album with Nayutawave, Bitter & Sweet. Bitter & Sweet is the most successful of Beni's career, it being certified gold by the RIAJ (her only album to receive a certification).

== Singles ==
"Sign", released January 20, 2010, was the first single from the album. "Sign" samples Yumi Matsutoya's number-one hit, "Haru yo, Koi" (春よ、来い, "Come, Spring"). The single charted at number 50 on the Oricon single chart. On the Billboard Japan Hot 100 the single peaked at number 96.

The second single released was "Bye Bye", on March 10, 2010. "Bye Bye" peaked at number 57 on the Oricon charts and is the lowest ranking single from the album.

The third single, "Yurayura/Gimme Gimme" was released May 5, 2010. "Yurayura/Gimme Gimme" saw more success than the other two singles. The single peaked at number 20 on the Oricon charts, becoming her first Top 20 single since "Mō Nido to...". "Yurayura" was also her highest-charting single on the Japan Hot 100, ranking in at #25.

== Promotion ==
Beni created a limited edition frozen yogurt for frozen yogurt chain RazzleBerry, called The Okinawan. She appeared at the Shibuya store on May the 15th for half an hour, acting as the store manager and selling the frozen yogurt to customers. The promotion was documented over three episodes on the late night TV show Future Tracks R.

One of the songs from the album, "Kimi ja Nakya," was released as a ringtone two weeks before the album's release date.

== Track listing ==
CD
No.	Title	Lyrics	Music	Producer(s)	Length
1.	"Lovebox Intro"	Daisuke "D.I" Imai	Imai		1:09
2.	"Yurayura"	Beni	Imai	Imai, Strings arranged by Ittetsu Gen	3:59
3.	"Sign" (Samples Yumi Matsutoya's "Haru yo, Koi.")	Beni, Masataka Yoshino	Beni, Yoshino, Yumi Matsutoya (sampling)	Strings arranged by Ittetsu Gen	4:25
4.	"Hitomi Tojite" (瞳とじて "Close Your Eyes")	Beni	Imai	Imai	4:14
5.	"Gimme Gimme"	Shoko Fujibayashi, Imai	Imai	Imai	3:42
6.	"Girl's Night" (featuring Jamosa)	Beni, Jamosa Lan	Imai	Imai	3:43
7.	"A Million Jewels"	Beni, Yo Taira, Lil' Showy	Lil' Showy	STY for Digz, Inc.	4:02
8.	"Kimi ja Nakya" (君じゃなきゃ "Got to Be You")	Yoko Kuzuya, Strings arranged by Ittetsu Gen	Kuzuya	Imai	4:45
9.	"Bye Bye"	Fujibayashi	Imai	Imai	3:52
10.	"Move"	Beni	Imai	Imai	3:58
11.	"Break the Rules"	Beni	Imai	Imai	3:03
12.	"He Is Mine"	Beni	Imai	Imai	3:57
13.	"My Friend" (マイ・フレンド Mai Furendo)	Beni	Beni, Yanagiman	Yanagiman	4:44
14.	"Message"	Beni	3rd Productions	3rd Productions	4:03
15.	"Zutto Futari de (Unplugged Version)" (Bonus track)	Beni, Yoshino	Beni, Yoshino	Strings arranged by Ittetsu Gen, Strings arranged by Hiroyuki Matsugashita	5:20
Total length:					58:56

DVD: Music videos
No.	Title	Director	Length
1.	"Yurayura"	Masaki Ohkita
2.	"Gimme Gimme"	Tatsuya Murakami
3.	"Bye Bye"	Takuya Tada
4.	"Sign"	Tada
5.	"Kira Kira"	Akihisa Takagi
6.	"Zutto Futari de (Unplugged Version)"	Seiji Kitahara

== Personnel ==
=== Recording personnel ===
- 3rd Productions - production (#3, #14)
- Beni - lyrics (#2–4, #6–7, #10–15), music (#13, #15)
- D.O.I. - mixing (#2, #5, #7, #9–12)
- Shoko Fujibayashi - lyrics (#5, #9)
- Shigeki "Crystal" Fujino - mastering
- Daisuke "D.I" Imai - arrangement (#1–2, #4–6, #8–12), chorus (#10), instruments (#1, #4–6, #9–11), lyrics (#5), mixing (#1), music (#1–2, #4–6, #9–12), production (#1–2, #4–6, #8–12, #15), programming (#2), recording (#1)
- Gen Ittetsu - string arrangement (#2–3, #8, #15)
- Jamosa - lyrics (#6)
- Shohei Katsuya - assistant engineer (#15)
- Kgro for Gidz, inc. - recording (#7)
- Yoko Kuzuya - lyrics, music, piano (#8)
- Lil' Showy - lyrics, instruments, music (#7)
- Hiroyuki Matsugashita - piano/piano arrangement (#15)
- Yumi Matsutoya - music (#3)
- Kaneko Mitsuyasu - recording (#4, #6, #14), mixing (#3–4, #6, #14–15)
- Tomohiro Murata - recording (#10–13)
- Manabu Ohta - recording (#2, #5, #8–9)
- Satoshi Sasamoto - recording (#15), string recording (#8)
- Shingo.S - instruments (#3, #14)
- STY for Digz, inc. - production (#7)
- Yo Taira - lyrics (#7)
- Shinsaku Takane - recording (#3)
- Kenichiro Wada - guitar (#8)
- Naoki Yamada - mixing (#8, #13)
- Yanagiman - music (#13), arrangement/production (#13), instruments (#13)
- Masataka Yoshino - lyrics (#3, #15), music (#3, #15)

=== Other personnel ===
- Seiichi Hibi - sales promotion manager
- Akira Kitajima - photography
- Susumu Machida - executive producer
- Hideki Nakano - media promotion manager
- Keiko Nakatani - hair, make-up
- Issey Nisawa - A&R
- Sakura Nishimura - digital marketing
- Shun Odagiri - artist management
- Takashi Oguni - visual producer
- Nami Sasaki - product management
- Shino Suganuma - styling
- Yasushi Suzuki - props
- Ikue Takahashi - art direction, design
- Toshiyuki Takano - A&R supervisor, head of media promotion
- Kazumasa Takase - head of product management, marketing supervisor
- Koshino Taketomi - sales promotion
- Mariko Takita - visual coordination
- Akira Terabayashi - executive producer
- Takashi Yamaguchi - digital marketing
- Masataka Yoshino - artist management, general producer
- Yasuaki Zushi - artwork coordination
