= One More Time, One More Chance =

Single by Masayoshi Yamazaki

from the album Home
- A-side: "One More Time, One More Chance"
- B-side: "Yousei to Ita Natsu"
- Released: January 22, 1997
- Studio: aLIVE Recording (Setagaya, Tokyo, Japan)
- Length: 5:25
- Label: Polydor (standard); Nayutawave (special edition)
- Songwriter: Masayoshi Yamazaki

Alternative cover
- 5 Centimeters per Second special edition cover

Music video
- One More Time, One More Chance on YouTube

"One More Time, One More Chance" (stylised as "One more time,One more chance") is a single by Japanese singer Masayoshi Yamazaki that was released on January 22, 1997, on the Polydor Japan label. It peaked on the Oricon weekly singles chart at No. 18 and charted for 24 weeks.

The song was originally used as a theme song in The Moon and a Cabbage, a 1996 film starring Yamazaki himself. It was later used as the ending theme song for the 2007 film 5 Centimeters per Second. As the song is played in a convenience store, the film's male lead, Takaki Tōno, recognizes it as a hit song since his junior high school. It was re-released on March 3 of that year under the label Nayutawave Records and reentered the chart at No. 52.

== Track listing ==
All lyrics/music/vocals by Masayoshi Yamazaki

One more time, One more chance standard edition
No.	Title	Arrangement	Length
1.	"One more time, One more chance"	Toshiyuki Mori	5:25
2.	"Yōsei to Ita Natsu (妖精といた夏)"	Kitaroh Nakamura	6:04
3.	"One more time, One more chance" (karaoke)	Mori	5:25
Total length:			16:54

One more time, One more chance (5 Centimeters per Second) special edition
No.	Title	Arrangement	Length
1.	"One more time, One more chance"	Mori	5:34
2.	"Yuki no Eki～One more time, One more chance～ (雪の駅～One more time, One more chance～) (Note: Yuki no Eki (雪の駅; lit. 'Snow Station'))" (from "5 Centimeters per Second" Soundtrack)	Tenmon	2:21
3.	"One more time, One more chance" (hikigatari version (弾き語りVer.) (Note: hikigatari version (弾き語りVer.; lit. 'acoustic version')))	Mori	5:31
Total length:			13:26

Catalog Number	PODH-1336
Barcode	4988005193230
Release Date	Jan 22, 1997
Publish Format	Commercial
Release Price	1000
Media Format	Mini CD
Classification	Vocal
Publisher	Polydor K.K.
Distributor	PolyGram K.K.

Catalog Number	UPCH-80013
Barcode	4988005464798
Release Date	Mar 03, 2007
Publish Format	Commercial
Release Price	1000
Media Format	CD
Classification	Vocal
Label	Universal Music
Distributor	UNIVERSAL MUSIC K.K.
Phonographic Copyright	NAYUTAWAVE RECORDS
Marketer	UNIVERSAL MUSIC K.K.

== Cover versions ==
- Beni Arashiro released an English version of the song in track 5 of the album Covers on March 21, 2012. The English lyrics were literally translated from the original Japanese.
- Koda Kumi covered this song in Track 5 of her album Color the Cover in 2013.
- Unchain, an alternative rock band, covered this song in track 6 of their album Love & Groove Delivery Vol. 2 in 2014.
- Akina Nakamori covered the song in her album "Belie" released in 2016 as well as an accompanying music video.
- Park Chanyeol from the K-pop group EXO made a cover of the song on September 25, 2016.
- Little Glee Monster covered the song in the album "Joyful Monster," released January 6, 2017.
- Astel Leda from the VTuber group Holostars released a cover of the song on December 7, 2020.

== Personnel ==
Main

- Masayoshi Yamazaki (山崎 将義(まさよし), Yamazaki Masayoshi) – lyrics, music, vocals
- Toshiyuki Mori – arrangement
- Kitaroh Nakamura (中村 キタロー, Nakamura Kitarō) – arrangement
- Tenmon_(composer) (天門) – arrangement

Production

- Shinichi Takizawa (瀧沢 真一, Takizawa Shinichi) – recording engineer, mixing engineer
- Naoki Iwata (岩田 直樹, Iwata Naoki) – assistant engineer
- Yōichi Aikawa (相川 洋一, Aikawa Yōichi) – mastering engineer

Studio

- aLIVE Recording Studio (Setagaya, Tokyo, Japan) – recording studio
