= 2face =

2face may refer to:

- 2face Idibia, Nigerian musician
- Two-Face, DC Comics supervillain
- "2Face" (song), a song by Beni
