= Fortune (Beni album) =

Studio album by Beni
- Released: November 2, 2011
- Recorded: 2010–2011
- Genre: Pop, R&B
- Length: 53:47
- Language: Japanese
- Label: Nayutawave Records; Universal Music Japan

Beni chronology
Lovebox Live Tour (2011)	Fortune (2011)	Jewel Concert Tour (2012)

Singles from Fortune
- 1. "Suki Dakara" Released: June 8, 2011; 2. "Koe wo Kikasete / Crazy Girl" Released: September 14, 2011; 3. "Darlin'" Released: October 12, 2011

Fortune is the fourth album released by Beni Arashiro under her new label Universal Music Japan under the mononym Beni on November 2, 2011. The CD+DVD version is a limited edition with all her single PVs with three live videos from her recorded "Jewel tour"

== Track listing ==
All lyrics are written by BENI.

CD
No.	Title	Music	Arranger(s)	Length
1.	"Fortune Intro"	Daisuke "D.I" Imai		1:11
2.	"Darlin'"	Daisuke "D.I." Imai	Daisuke "D.I" Imai	4:19
3.	"Suki Dakara" (好きだから; I Love You So)	BENI, Masataka Yoshino	Strings arranged by Gen Ittetsu	4:01
4.	"LAST SONG"	Daisuke "D.I." Imai	Daisuke "D.I" Imai	4:04
5.	"MEMORY"	BENI, Masataka Yoshino	Daisuke "D.I" Imai, Strings arranged by Gen Ittetsu	4:22
6.	"My World"	Daisuke "D.I." Imai	Daisuke "D.I" Imai	3:48
7.	"Crazy Girl"	lil' showy		3:51
8.	"One In A Million"	Daisuke "D.I." Imai	Daisuke "D.I" Imai	3:42
9.	"Koe wo Kikasete" (声を聞かせて; Let Me Hear Your Voice)	BENI, Masataka Yoshino, Hidenori	Strings arranged by Gen Ittetsu	5:09
10.	"Secret"	Daisuke "D.I." Imai	Daisuke "D.I" Imai	4:04
11.	"Yes Or No?"	lil' showy		3:43
12.	"Oh Yeah!"	lil' showy		3:31
13.	"Unmei No Hito" (運命の人; A Person Of Fate)	3rd Productions		3:56
14.	"Only One" (Bonus Track)	Daisuke "D.I." Imai	Daisuke "D.I" Imai	3:50
Total length:				53:47

DVD
No.	Title	Length
1.	"Suki Dakara" (Music video)
2.	"Koe Wo Kikasete" (Music video)
3.	"Crazy Girl" (Music video)
4.	"Darlin" (Music video)
5.	"Zutto Futari De" (Live from Jewel Concert Tour 2011)
6.	"Koi Kogarete" (Live from Jewel Concert Tour 2011)
7.	"Gimme Gimme" (Live from Jewel Concert Tour 2011)

== Charts ==
Chart	Peak position	Reported sales
Oricon Albums Daily Chart	3	
Oricon Albums Weekly Chart	5	23,000
