= Covers 2 =

Covers 2 may refer to:

- Covers 2 (Show of Hands album), 2010
- Covers 2 (Beni album), 2012
