= Count Down TV =

Japanese music television program

- Show logo as of 2020
- Also known as: CDTV
- カウントダウン・ティーヴィー
- Presented by: Hiromi Ishikawa (Abī-kun); Masami Kikuchi (Kikuchi-kun); Kaede Ito (Maple)
- Country of origin: Japan
- Original language: Japanese

Production
- Producers: Shinji Suzuki; Takayuki Ishibashi; Kō Serata; Shintarō Ōki
- Running time: 30–60 minutes (specials may be extended)
- Production company: TBS

Original release
- Network: JNN (TBS)
- Release: 7 April 1993 – present

Count Down TV (カウントダウン・ティーヴィー, Kauntodaun Tīvī) (also known as CDTV) is a Japanese late-night music television program, broadcast on TBS since 1993. The program is shown weekly, and features a Japanese music video hit chart countdown, live performances from musicians and music information. It is presented by three animated hosts.

== History ==
The show was created after the gap left by the cessation of the long-running TBS countdown show The Best Ten (1978–1989). A top 100 music countdown show called Totsuzen Baraetī Sokuhō!! Count Down 100 (突然バラエティー速報!!COUNT DOWN100, Sudden Variety Show Report!! Count Down 100) (presented by Kuniko Tamada and Masayuki Watanabe) begun airing on TBS networks from October 1992, however received low ratings in its targeted youth market (due to its early airing time, 8pm, and the at average 10pm returning home time of the target audience). The show finished airing in March 1993.

The show was rebranded, becoming Count Down TV and airing from April 1993 onwards. Some of the rebranding changes were later broadcast times, CGI hosts and imagery, along with only airing the top 40 chart rank-ins. The format has remained basically the same over the years. Some changes have been extending the broadcast from 30 minutes to 40 (and extending the charts from top 40 to top 50) and introducing album/ringtone chart countdowns.

Since April 2020, Count Down TV was split into 2 different programs: CDTV! Saturday (CDTVサタデー, CDTV satadē) in Sundays 12:58am, and CDTV! LIVE! LIVE! (CDTVライブ！ライブ！, CDTV raibu! raibu!) in Mondays 9pm; Mondays 10pm from March 30, 2020 - March 29, 2021. The same CGI hosts presented the Saturday edition while TBS announcer Ai Eto presented the Monday edition. The Saturday edition ended on March 21, 2021. The ranking segment which has been part of the Saturday (original) edition was then carried over to the Monday edition.

== Main Segments ==
The show is split up into several chart segments, based around weekly or monthly sales. Weekly singles rankings are split into last week's top 10, #30-#21, #20-#11, #10-#4, and sequential sections for singles ranking #3, #2 and #1. The top 10 albums' chart is briefly broadcast (from April 2009, non-domestic albums also feature), along with the top 10/20 ringtones. Other than these charts, between 1-3 musical guests perform in weekly segments (generally songs popular on the charts at the time), along with an older clip from the 'CDTV library' and fortune telling for the week.

The monthly segments include Shinkyoku Express (新曲EXPRESS, New Song Express) (generally shown in the first week), CDTV History/Album Library (previous #1 singles/albums from that month in history), the top 10 songs performed at karaoke for that month, the top albums/DVDs. The CDTV Award for the top single/album/ringtone/DVD that month is also announced.

Other segments include information segments for hyped music videos/film tie-up songs/dorama theme songs (potentially with sample clips from these music videos), and user submission polls for such questions as 'Which artist do you want as a lover?', 'What song do you want for your Wedding?', etc.

== CDTV Top 100 ==
Count Down TV ranks its music video countdown on the CDTV Top 100 chart. The chart is tallied by a combination of Oricon's singles chart and cable broadcast requests. Due to this, songs not officially released as singles (such as album tracks, B-sides, digital download singles, or the single before its official release) occasionally rank in, if the song has a music video that has been submitted to the station. As of December 2009, only these 13 tracks have achieved this:

- Dohzi-T feat. Beni - "Mō Ichi do..." (もう一度…) (4 weeks early rank-in at #90)
- Dreams Come True - "Shichigatsu Nanoka, Hare" (7月7日、晴れ) (album "Love Unlimited" album track)
- Exile & Kumi Koda - "Won't Be Long" (1 week early rank-in at #94)
- Glay - "Yūwaku" (誘惑) (2 weeks early rank-in at #97)
- Greeeen - "Kiseki" (キセキ) (2 weeks early rank-in at #76)
- Kiyoshi Hikawa - "Ōi Okkake Otojirō" (大井追っかけ音次郎) (1 week early rank-in at #99)
- Kiyoshi Hikawa - "Genkai Funauta" (玄海船歌) (1 week early rank-in at #92)
- Hi-Standard - "Love Is a Battlefield" (considered an album by Oricon, but a single by CDTV)
- Sharam Q - "Konna ni Anata o Aishiteiru noni" (こんなにあなたを愛しているのに) (single "Īwake"'s B-side)
- George Tokoro - "Tonkachi" (トンカチ) (considered an album by Oricon, but a single by CDTV)
- Hikaru Utada - "First Love" (1 week early rank-in at #99)
- Hikaru Utada - "Prisoner of Love" (1 week early rank-in at #84)
- Yui - "Laugh Away" (digital single)

As the charts are formulated from only Japanese domestic artists, it is rare for an overseas artist to rank on the charts (usually this is done when a collaboration single with a Japanese artist is released). The non-Japanese artists to rank on the CDTV charts (non-domestically) are:

- Naomi Campbell ("La La La Love Song" w/ Toshinobu Kubota)
- Céline Dion ("Anata ga Iru Kagiri (A World to Believe In)" (あなたがいる限り, As Long as I Have You) w/ Yuna Ito)
- Melissa Manchester ("Stand in the Light" w/ Tatsuro Yamashita)
- Park Yong-ha (originally considered an overseas artist on his first single, "Kajimaseyo" (カジマセヨ) [which did not chart])
- Maxi Priest ("Love Somebody" w/ Yūji Oda)
- Richie Sambora ("Forever" w/ Takashi Sorimachi)
- Ryu Si-won
- Brian Setzer ("Back Streets of Tokyo" w/ Tomoyasu Hotei)
- Roger Taylor ("Foreign Sand" w/ Yoshiki)
- Twelve Girls Band ("Loulan" (楼蘭) w/ Sachiko Kobayashi)
- Caron Wheeler ("Just the Two of Us" w/ Toshinobu Kubota)
- Faye Wong ("Eyes on Me", "Separate Ways")

Count Down TV also ranks albums and ringtone downloads, but uses the raw data from Oricon and Recochoku, respectively.

== Annual Song Rank No.1 ==
| Year | Song | Artist |
|---|---|---|
| 2000 | Tsunami* | Southern All Stars |
| 2001 | Can You Keep a Secret? | Hikaru Utada |
| 2002 | Wadatsumi Tree | Chitose Hajime |
| 2003 | Sekai ni Hitotsu Dake no Hana | SMAP |
| 2004 | Hitomi o Tojite | Ken Hirai |
| 2005 | Youth Amigo | Shūji to Akira |
| 2006 | Real Face | KAT-TUN |
| 2007 | Sen no Kaze ni Natte | Masafumi Akikawa |
| 2008 | Truth / Kaze no Mukō e | Arashi |
| 2009 | Believe / Kumorinochi, Kaisei | Arashi/Satoshi Ohno |
| 2010 | Beginner | AKB48** |
| 2011 | Flying Get* | AKB48** |
| 2012 | **Manatsu no Sounds Good!*** | AKB48** |
| 2013 | Sayonara Crawl | AKB48** |
| 2014 | Labrador Retriever | AKB48** |
| 2015 | Bokutachi wa Tatakawanai | AKB48** |
| 2016 | **Tsubasa wa Iranai** | AKB48** |
| 2017 | **Koi** | Gen Hoshino |
| 2018 | **Lemon** | Kenshi Yonezu |
| 2019 | **Lemon** | Kenshi Yonezu |
| 2020 | **Yoru ni Kakeru** | Yoasobi |

* These songs also won the Grand Prix of Japan Record Award.

** AKB48 keeps the record for the most No.1 of the year (7 times).

*** The bold font indicates these songs are also the No.1 in Hot 100 of the year of Billboard Japan.

== Specials ==
In addition to the main episodes, Count Down TV has aired various specials during its run including the year-end special New Year's Eve Premier Live.

== Presenters ==
Presenters Abī-kun, Kikuchi-kun and Mākī

The presenters of the show are computer-rendered animated characters. There are always three presenters: two (Abī-kun (アビー君), voiced by Hiromi Ishikawa and Kikuchi-kun (菊池君), voiced by Masami Kikuchi) have been constant, while the third changed over time. The third is generally a famous program announcer on other TBS television shows. The six third animated announcers are:

- Fumie (フミエ) (voiced by Yumi Takada)
- Demiko (デミコ) (voiced by Yumi Takada)
- Mika-chan (ミカちゃん) (voiced by Mika Horii)
- Iku-chan (イクちゃん) (voiced by Ikumi Kimura)
- Chī-chan (チーちゃん) (voiced by Chisato Kaiho)
- Mākī (マーキー) (voiced by Maki Arai)

== Theme Songs ==
Since the show's inception in June 1993, two popular music songs have been used as the show's opening and ending theme songs, changing monthly. For a complete list of these songs, see the list on the Japanese Wikipedia.

== CDTV in popular culture ==
- The TV Tokyo popular anime "Gin Tama" episode's 2009 "Start the Countdown" featured a CD Gin Tama segment, in which all of the greatest quotes from the show were listed. A guest live was even included, in the form of Hitomi Takahashi (whose song "Wo Ai Ni" was the ending theme song at the time). A Gin Tama-styled animated Takahashi even gave a brief comment before her performance. The CD Gin Tama segment was repeated again in the episode "Screw Popularity Polls."
- The Fuji TV variety show "Mecha-Mecha Iketeru!" features a segment called ICDTV (Iketeru Count Down TV), in which two songs are picked by members, and the one voted on most is chosen to be parodied.
- The Dame Dame Boys (ダメダメボーイズ) segment of the Fuji TV variety show "Akashiya Mansion Monogatari" (明石家マンション物語) featured a countdown of their most popular moments on the show called CDDD (Count Down Dame Dame).
