= 12 Love Stories =

- Cover to the standard edition of the album

Studio album by Dohzi-T
- Released: September 24, 2008
- Genre: Japanese hip hop, J-pop
- Length: 61:52
- Label: Universal Music Japan

Dohzi-T chronology
One Mic (2007)	12 Love Stories (2008)

12 Love Stories is an album released by Japanese rapper Dohzi-T. The album came in 2 versions: CD only and CD+DVD. The CD+DVD (named 12 Love Stories -Sweet Love Box-) was a limited edition containing 2 promotional videos. This was the first album from Dohzi-T to chart in the top 10 on the Oricon Chart and selling over 200,000 copies. All the songs in the album have the same theme: love. This album contains a lot of collaborations with various artists. The album had as single release "Mō Ichi do..." which was a long charting hit selling over 80,000 copies. This album is ranked as #55 on the yearly Oricon chart.

== Track listing ==
=== CD Track listing ===
1. Mō Ichido... feat. BENI (もう一度...; Once More)
2. better days feat. Miliyah Kato, Tanaka Roma
3. Yakusoku no Hi feat. Thelma Aoyama (約束の日; Day of Promise)
4. ONE LOVE feat. Shota Shimizu
5. Negai feat. YU-A/Foxxi misQ (願い; Wish)
6. AINOKACHI feat. KREVA
7. Good Night
8. In-mail feat. JUJU
9. Minori aru Jinsei o (実りある人生を; Fruitful Life)
10. Hikaru Mirai feat. Miliyah Kato (光る未来; Shiny future)
11. Ai ni Ikō (会いにいこう; I'll be seeing)
12. summer days feat. BENI<08'ver>

-Bonus Track-

1. Kimi Dake o-remix-/Hiromi Go feat.童子-T (君だけを; For you)

=== DVD Track listing ===
1. Mou Ichi do... feat BENI PV
2. Yakusoku no Hi feat. Thelma Aoyama PV
