= Suki Dakara (Beni song) =

Single by Beni

from the album Fortune
- B-side: "One In A Million"
- Released: June 8, 2011
- Recorded: 2011
- Genre: Pop, R&B
- Length: 4:04
- Label: Nayutawave Records
- Songwriter(s): BENI, Yoshino Masataka

Beni singles chronology
"2Face" (2010)	"Suki Dakara" (2011)	"Koe wo Kikasete / Crazy Girl" (2011)

"Suki Dakara" (好きだから。) is Beni's eleventh single under the label Nayutawave Records. "Suki Dakara" is a "sad love song that paints a love that you don't give up on even though it may be hard and it hurts." The song is said to be similar to her previous released songs "Mō Nido to..." and "Koi Kogarete" Both songs were later added on Beni's 7th album (4th under Nayutawave Records) "Fortune".

== Track list ==
CD
No.	Title	Lyrics	Music	Length
1.	"Suki Dakara" (好きだから。)	BENI	BENI, Yoshino Masataka	4:04
2.	"One In A Million"	BENI	Daisuki "D.I." Imai	3:46
3.	"Suki Dakara" (Instrumental)			4:03
4.	"One In A Million" (Instrumental)			3:43
Total length:				15:30

== Charts ==
Chart	Peak position
Oricon Weekly chart	46
RIAJ Digital Track Chart weekly top 100	8
