= Beni (album) =

Studio album by Beni Arashiro
- Released: February 9, 2005
- Genre: J-pop
- Label: Avex Trax

Beni Arashiro chronology
| Beni (2005) | Girl 2 Lady (2006) |

Alternative Cover
- CD + DVD

Beni is the debut album of artist Beni Arashiro, released on February 9, 2005. The album is available in two different versions, CD+DVD and CD-only. The CD+DVD version was a limited edition, and has sold out. There were a total of four singles released before the release of this album. The album charted on the #14 spot on the Oricon ranking and sold 12,776 copies in its first week.

== Track listing ==
CD
| No. | Title | Lyrics | Music | Arranger(s) | Length |
|---|---|---|---|---|---|
| 1. | "Introduction" | | Hirofumi Asamoto | Hirofumi Asamoto | 1:33 |
| 2. | "Here Alone" (Album version) | JUSME | Hirofumi Asamoto | Hirofumi Asamoto | 3:52 |
| 3. | "Harmony" | JUSME | MONK | SMURF | 5:17 |
| 4. | "Breakout" | BENI | Hirofumi Asamoto | Hirofumi Asamoto | 4:47 |
| 5. | "True Fighter" | JUSME | CMJK | CMJK | 4:23 |
| 6. | "Miracle" (Album version) | JUSME | Hirofumi Asamoto | Hirofumi Asamoto, Strings arranged by Tatsuya Murayama | 4:25 |
| 7. | "Oh, Happy Day" (Studio live version) | Edwin R. Hawkins | Edwin R. Hawkins | Hirofumi Asamoto | 3:35 |
| 8. | "Silhouette" (Album version) | Hideyuki Obata | Hirofumi Asamoto | Hirofumi Asamoto, Strings arranged by Tatsuya Murayama | 5:27 |
| 9. | "Infinite..." | JUSME | Junpei Takada | CMJK | 4:29 |
| 10. | "Gems" | Mikiko Tagata | Hirofumi Asamoto | Hirofumi Asamoto, Strings arranged by Tatsuya Murayama | 4:32 |
| 11. | "Daphne" | Hideyuki Obata | CMJK | CMJK | 5:46 |
| 12. | "Step" | Hideyuki Obata | Hirofumi Asamoto | Hirofumi Asamoto | 3:54 |
| 13. | "Always" | JUSME | Hirofumi Asamoto | Hirofumi Asamoto | 5:48 |
| 14. | "Give Me Up" (Bonus track for Regular Edition) | Michael De San Antonio, Pierre Michael Nigro (Michael Fortunati) | Mario Giuseppe Nigro | Keiichi Ueno | 3:59 |

DVD (Limited Edition)
| No. | Title | Length |
|---|---|---|
| 1. | "Harmony" (Promotion video) |
| 2. | "Infinite..." (Promotion video) |
| 3. | "Here Alone" (Promotion video) |
| 4. | "Oh, Happy Day" (Studio live version) |
| 5. | "Debut Event Special Digest" |

== Singles ==
| Date | Title | Peak position | Weeks |
|---|---|---|---|
| June 9, 2004 | "Harmony" | #26 | - |
| October 20, 2004 | "Infinite..." | #24 | - |
| November 25, 2004 | "Here Alone" | #14 | - |
| February 9, 2005 | "Miracle" | #98 | - |

== Album sales ==
| Mon | Tue | Wed | Thu | Fri | Sat | Sun | Week Rank | Sales |
|---|---|---|---|---|---|---|---|---|
| - | x | x | x | x | x | x | #14 | 12,776 |
| x | x | x | x | x | x | x | #43 | 5,405 |
| x | x | x | x | x | x | x | x | - |

Total Reported Sales: 18,181
