= Girl 2 Lady =

Studio album by Beni Arashiro
- Released: February 22, 2006
- Genre: J-Pop
- Label: Avex Trax

Beni Arashiro chronology
Beni (2005)	Girl 2 Lady (2006)	GEM (2007)

Alternative Cover
- CD + DVD

Girl 2 Lady is the second album released by Beni Arashiro from label Avex Trax. The song FLASH was a digital released and was a CM theme song for the product KOSE VISEE. The album reached the #87 spot on the Oricon charts.

== Track listing ==
CD
No.	Title	Lyrics	Music	Arranger(s)	Length
1.	"The Power"	CMJK	CMJK	CMJK	4:57
2.	"Wake Up"	JUSME, Beni	CMJK	CMJK	4:29
3.	"Heart 2 Heart"	JUSME	Hirofumi Asamoto	Hirofumi Asamoto	4:25
4.	"Cherish"	Makoto ATOZI	Koutarou Egami	CMJK	5:14
5.	"Flash feat. Kohei Japan"	Beni, CMJK	CMJK	CMJK	4:11
6.	"Hikari no Kazu dake Glamorous (光の数だけｸﾞﾗﾏﾗｽ)"	JUSME	Yukihiro Fukutomi	Yukihiro Fukutomi	4:07
7.	"Into the Sky"	Beni	Yukihiro Fukutomi	Yukihiro Fukutomi	6:27
8.	"Secret Lover"	JUSME	Hirofumi Asamoto	Hirofumi Asamoto	4:33
9.	"Taiy ō ga Tsuki wo terashite (光太陽が月を照らして)"	CMJK	CMJK	CMJK	5:11
10.	"Koi meguri (恋めぐり)"	Kenji Ueda	Hirofumi Asamoto	Hirofumi Asamoto	5:21
11.	"Flash feat. Kohei Japan" (Bonus track on CD)	CMJK	CMJK	CMJK	4:11
12.	"Come Close to Me" (Bonus track on CD)	JUSME, Beni	Yukihiro Fukutomi	Yukihiro Fukutomi	4:07
13.	"Give Me Up" (Bonus track)	Pierre Michael Nigro (Michael Fortunati), Michael De San Antonio	Mario Giuseppe Nigro	Keiichi Ueno	3:59

DVD: Music videos
No.	Title	Length
1.	"Miracle" (Promotion video)
2.	"Hikari no Kazu dake Glamorous" (Promotion video)
3.	"Cherish" (Special promotion video)
4.	"Beni TV Special" (Special video)

== Charts ==
=== Oricon Sales Chart (Japan) ===
Release	Chart	Peak position	Sales total	Chart run
22 February 2006	Oricon Daily Albums Chart	-	-	-
22 February 2006	Oricon Weekly Albums Chart	#87	-	-
22 February 2006	Oricon Monthly Albums Chart	-	-	-
22 February 2006	Oricon Yearly Albums Chart	-	-	-

== Singles ==
Date	Title	Peak position	Weeks
June 1, 2005	"Hikari no Kazu dake Glamorous"	#40	-
December 7, 2005	"Cherish"	#96	-
