= BaBe =

Japanese pop duo

- Origin: Tokyo, Japan
- Genres: Pop, J-pop
- Years active: 1987–1990
- Label: Pony Canyon
- Past members: Tomoko Kondo; Yukari Nikaido

BaBe (ベイブ; pronounced "babe") was a Japanese pop duo, composed of Tomoko Kondo and Yukari Nikaido. They debuted in February 1987 with a cover of Michael Fortunati's "Give Me Up". From February 1987 to February 1990 they had several hits including "I Don't Know", "Somebody Loves You", and "Get a Chance!".

Their highest single ranking on the Oricon charts was #4 in 1987 for Somebody Loves You. They sang "Get A Chance!" as the end theme and post-credits music video in the third Project A-ko anime and the television adaptation of Hana no Asuka-gumi!. They also sang an all-English song, "Love in the First Degree" (a cover of the Bananarama single).

They disbanded in February 1990 because of Yukari's marriage and pregnancy.

== Members ==
- Tomoko Kondo (近藤 智子, Kondō Tomoko) was born on February 17, 1968, in Tokyo, Japan.
- Yukari Nikaido (二階堂 ゆかり, Nikaidō Yukari) was born on August 29, 1967, in Tokyo, Japan.

== Discography ==
=== Albums ===
- Bravo! – June 21, 1987
- Nice! – December 5, 1987 JP #14
- Fight – June 21, 1988 JP #12 (mini album)
- Brand New – April 21, 1989 JP #26
- Contrast – February 22, 1990

=== Compilation albums ===
- Good! The Best of BaBe – January 5, 1988 JP #11
- The Best of BaBe – May 21, 1990
- BaBe Best – March 20, 2002
- BaBe Singles – August 17, 2007
- My Kore! Lite BaBe – April 21, 2010
- The Premium Best BaBe – November 21, 2012

=== Singles ===
- "Give Me Up" – February 21, 1987 JP #8
- "I Don't Know!" – May 2, 1987 JP #5
- "Somebody Loves You" – September 10, 1987 JP #4
- "Hold Me" – October 21, 1987 JP #7
- "Tonight" – January 21, 1988 JP #7
- "Get a Chance" – May 11, 1988 JP #9
- "Wake Up!" – August 31, 1988 JP #18
- "She Has a Dream" – March 1, 1989 JP #37
