= Track 5 =

Australian urban music act

Track 5 are an Australian urban music act based in Melbourne.

== History ==
Track 5 was formed in 2001 by Krishna "Krishool" Norgbedzie, Adam "Adz" Lovell, Paul "Verx" Vercoe, Matthew "Matty D" De'Ath and John "JV" Vitale. Krishool was born in Ghana and joined the Australian Boys Choir after his family moved to Australia - he also auditioned for Popstars but was unsuccessful. Adam Lovell was born in Brisbane and comes from a background in circus and theater while Paul Vercoe was born in rural Victoria and has classical training in piano and choirs. While the band originally had five members, the other two members of the band Matthew & John didn't stay around long due to personal music differences but would still pursue their passion of music by staying in the field. Matthew De'Ath composes lyrics & music for other Australian artists & bands while John Vitale pursued his love of dance by joining the Australian Ballet.

Track 5 built up their reputation through live performances around Australia. They won a Philips Five Minutes competition in 2002 and recorded a track "Not the One" which didn't chart. They signed with Depac Music in early 2004. Producers Paul Carmody and Steuart De Hoedt produced their debut single on that label "Crazy". Released in June 2004, it made the top 50 of the Australian singles charts in July 2004.

In 2005 to raise money for a trip to Berlin's PopKomm festival they put themselves on EBay, getting no takers for their self-priced starting bid.

== Members ==
- Krishna Norgbedzie A.K.A. Krishool
- Adam Lovell A.K.A. Adz
- Paul Vercoe A.K.A. Verx
- Matthew De'Ath A.K.A. Matty D
- John Vitali A.K.A. JV

== Discography ==
=== Singles ===
List of singles, with selected chart positions
Title	Year	Peak chart positions
Title	Year	AUS
"Crazy"	2004	50
