= Give Me Up =

1986 single by Michael Fortunati

Single by Michael Fortunati
- Released: 1986
- Genre: Italo disco; Eurobeat
- Label: EMI
- Songwriters: Michel Jean Machtergaele; Mario Nigro; Pierre Nigro
- Producers: Michel Jean Machtergaele; Pierre Nigro

"Give Me Up" is a song by Italian singer Michael Fortunati released as a single in 1986. A pioneering work of Eurobeat, it has since been recorded by several Japanese artists including BaBe, Beni Arashiro, Melon Kinenbi, Yōko Nagayama, Nami Tamaki and W (on their 2004 album Duo U&U). A remix was featured in the 2006 arcade game Dance Dance Revolution SuperNova, with the original being featured in test versions of the 2008 arcade game Jubeat.

== BaBe version ==
"Give Me Up"

Song by BaBe

from the album Bravo!
- Language: Japanese
- B-side: "THEY DON'T KNOW ~Kanashimi wa asa no Shizuku no yo ni~"
- Released: February 21, 1987
- Genre: Italo disco; Eurobeat
- Label: Canyon Records
- Songwriters: Michel Jean Machtergaele; Mario Nigro; Pierre Nigro
- Lyricist: Yukinojo Mori (Japanese Lyrics)

BaBe singles chronology
"Give Me Up" (1987)	"I Don't Know" (1987)

Japanese pop duo BaBe recorded a Japanese-language cover of "Give Me Up" as their debut single, released on February 21, 1987.

== Nami Tamaki version ==
"Give Me Up"

Single by Nami Tamaki
- B-side: "Ichizu na Negai"; "Kanojo"; "In My Life"
- Released: March 25, 2009
- Genre: J-pop
- Label: Universal Music Japan
- Songwriters: Michel Jean Machtergaele; Mario Nigro; Pierre Nigro

Nami Tamaki singles chronology
"Winter Ballades" (2007)	"Give Me Up" (2009)	"Friends!" (2009)

On March 25, 2009, it was covered by Nami Tamaki for her sixteenth single, and her first in 2009. It is based on the version by BaBe. The music video for the single was posted on Universal J-s YouTube page. The music video features Tamaki wearing '80s-style clothes and dancing in a brightly colored room with friends; it also cuts to shots of her wearing a large pink bow on her head and also one of her on a bicycle. Her pet dog also makes an appearance in the music video. The music video was first aired on TV on February 20.

=== Single versions ===
CD (Regular Edition)

1. "Give Me Up"
2. "イチズナネガイ (Ichizu na negai) (Wholehearted Wish)"
3. "彼女 (Kanojo) (Girlfriend)"
4. "Give Me Up" (Instrumental)

CD (Limited Edition)

1. "Give Me Up"
2. "イチズナネガイ (Ichizu na negai)"
3. "In My Life"
4. "Give Me Up" (Instrumental)

CD+DVD (Limited Edition)

CD:

1. "Give Me Up"
2. "イチズナネガイ (Ichizu na negai)"
3. "Give Me Up" (Instrumental)

DVD:

1. "Give Me Up" Music Clip
