= Michael Fortunati =

Italian singer (born 1955)

- Born: Pierre Michel Nigro; 4 September 1955 (age 70); Villa Castelli, Brindisi, Apulia, Italy
- Origin: Hem, Nord, France
- Genres: Italo disco; Eurobeat
- Occupation: Singer
- Years active: 1970s–present
- Labels: EMI; Avex Trax

Pierre Michel Nigro (born 4 September 1955), better known as Michael Fortunati, is an Italo disco/Eurobeat singer.

== Biography ==
Pierre Nigro was born in the province of Brindisi, Apulia, Italy, but grew up in Hem in the north of France, where he formed the group Carré D'As in the 1970s with his brothers. They released several albums in the 1980s. Nigro then began a solo career under the pseudonym Michael Fortunati, and met success with his first record "Give Me Up", released in the summer of 1986. It was a big hit in Belgium, France and Japan.

He is particularly well known in Japan, where the musical style Eurobeat is popular, and has released many albums and compilations in Japan alone. In 1987, Fortunati performed at the Tokyo Music Festival and won the Grand Prix award in the Disco & Dance Division. He has also appeared on several Japanese TV shows. "Give Me Up" has subsequently been covered by numerous Japanese singers such as BaBe, Yōko Nagayama, Beni Arashiro, Mi, Melon Kinenbi and Nami Tamaki.

== Discography ==
=== Albums ===
- Give Me Up (1987)
- Alleluia (1988)
- Fire (1989)
- Big Bang (1991)
- Baby Break It Up! (1995), Avex Trax
- Dreamin' (1997), Avex Trax

=== Compilation albums ===
- The World Remixes (1990)
- Remix It Up! (1995), Avex Trax
- The Greatest Hits (1992)
- The Best of Michael Fortunati (Hyper NonStop Mix) (1995), Avex Trax
- Best of 2000 (2000), Victor Entertainment
- Give Me Up – The Very Best of Michael Fortunati (2002), Toshiba EMI
- Give Me Up – The Complete Best of Michael Fortunati (2008)
- The Best of Disco Covers (2018)

=== Singles ===
- "Give Me Up" (1986)
- "Alleluia" (1987)
- "Gonna Get You" (Remix) (1987)
- "Into the Night" (1987)
- "Giochi di fortuna" (1987)
- "Energyse" / "Mia Liberta" (a.k.a. "Boku No Yume") (1987)
- "Let Me Down" (1988)
- "Danse avec moi" (1989)
- "ABC (It's Called)" (1989)
- "Baby You" (1990)
- "I'm Not a Freak" (1991)
- "Big Bang" / "Tokyo Girl" (1991)
- "Take Me On Up" / "Give Me Up" (Remix) (1992)
- "Generate" (1993)
- "Techno Cha Cha Cha" (1994)
- "Baby Break It Up!" (1995)
- "Koo Koo"/"C'est You! Oh No!"/"Hoochie Coo"/"Crazy Baby"
- "Dreamin'" (1997)
- "Give Me Up Is Still Alive" (with Laurent C) (2001)
- Japan Tour E.P. 01 (2004)
