= 2Face (song) =

Single by Beni

from the album Jewel
- Released: November 24, 2010
- Recorded: 2010
- Genre: Pop, R&B
- Length: 3:35
- Label: Nayutawave Records
- Songwriter(s): Lyrics: Beni; Music: Daisuke "D.I" Imai

Beni singles chronology
"Heaven's Door" (2010)	"2Face" (2010)	"Suki Dakara" (2011)

"2Face" is Beni's tenth single under the label Nayutawave Records. "2Face" is a "fierce song about a woman who can't be honest". The single is limited to 10,000 copies and comes with a special towel. According to Beni's blog, this song "should showcase a new Beni" In the first week of the Chaku-Uta weekly charts, the song 2FACE charted at #25. On the Chaku-Uta weekly chart Full it was ranked at #42.

== Track list ==
CD
No.	Title	Lyrics	Music	Length
1.	"2Face"	Beni	Daisuke "D.I" Imai	3:35
2.	"Heaven's Door" (DJ Hasebe Remix)	Kiyoshi Matsuo	Matsuo	4:40
3.	"Yurayura" (Jazztronik Remix)	Beni	Daisuke "D.I" Imai	5:25
4.	"2Face (Instrumental)"			3:33
