= Masayoshi Yamazaki =

Japanese singer-songwriter (born 1971)

Masayoshi Yamazaki 山崎 まさよし
- Birth name: 山崎 将義 (Yamazaki Masayoshi)
- Also known as: Masayan, Masa
- Born: December 23, 1971 (age 53); Kusatsu, Shiga, Japan
- Genres: Alternative rock, J-pop
- Years active: 1995–present
- Labels: Polydor Japan(1995–2000); Universal Music Japan(2001–present); Office Augusta (production company)

Masayoshi Yamazaki (山崎 まさよし, Yamazaki Masayoshi; born 山崎 将義 Yamazaki Masayoshi on December 23, 1971, in Kusatsu Shiga) is a Japanese singer-songwriter who plays guitar-driven blues, rock, and pop music, though he has also recorded piano ballads. Though he primarily plays the guitar, he has played the drums, piano, percussion, saxophone, and glockenspiel on some albums.

He released his second album in 1997, which contained his breakout and most famous single "One More Time, One More Chance." This song was used in Makoto Shinkai's anime film 5 Centimeters per Second.

In November of 2002, he performed the Beatles song "All My Loving" for Sir Paul McCartney while the latter was backstage after a show in Japan on the Driving World Tour.

== Discography ==
=== Singles ===
- Tsukiakari ni Terasarete (1995)
- Chuka Ryori (1996)
- Serori (1996)
- One more time, One more chance (1997)
- Adrenaline (1997)
- Furimukanai (1997)
- Mizu no Nai Suisou (1998)
- Boku ha Koko ni Iru (1998)
- Passage (1999)
- Yawarakai Tsuki (2000)
- Ashita no Kaze (2000)
- Plastic Soul (2001)
- Shinpakusu (2002)
- Zenbu Kimi datta (2003)
- Mikansei (2003)
- Boku to Furyo to Koutei de (2003)
- Bokura ha Shizuka ni Kieteiku (2004)
- Biidama Bouenkyou (2004)
- Menuetto (2005)
- 8-gatsu no Christmas (2005)
- Angel-A (2006)
- One More Time, One More Chance (5 centimeters Per Second Special Edition) (2007)
- Mayonaka no Boon Boon (2008)
- Shinkaigyo (2008)
- Heart of Winter (2008)
- Haru mo Arashi mo (2009)
- Hobo Walking (2010)
- Hanabi (2010)
- Taiyo no Yakusoku (2012)
- Aphrodite (2012)
- Hoshizora Guitar (2012)
- Altair no Namida (2013)
- Kokoro No Tegami (2014)
- Nijuuisseiki Man (20th Anniversary Version) (2015)
- Sorae (2016)
- Kimono Namae (2016)
- Hasen no Namida (2018)
- Kaisou Densha (2019)
- Kagefumi (Movie Version) (2019)

=== Studio albums ===
- Allergy no tokkoyaku (Specific for allergy) (1996)
- Home (1997)
- domino (1998)
- Sheep (2000)
- transition (2001)
- Atelier (2003)
- Address (2006)
- In My House (2009)
- Hobo's Music (2010)
- Flowers (2013)
- Life (2016)
- Quarter Note (2019)

=== EP ===
- Celery (1996)
- Stereo (1996)
- Stereo 2 (1997)
- Furimukanai/Gamushara Butterfly (1997)
- Boku Wa Kokoniiru (1998)
- Passage (1999)
- Plastic Soul (2001)
- Shinpakusuu (Toukai Area/Live) (2002)
- Shinpakusuu (Touhoku Area/Live) (2002)
- Shinpakusuu (Shinetsu Hokuriku Area/Live) (2002)
- Shinpakusuu (Shikoku Area/Live) (2002)
- Shinpakusuu (Kyuushuu Okinawa/Live) (2002)
- Shinpakusuu (Kinki Area/Live) (2002)
- Shinpakusuu (Kantou Area/Live) (2002)
- Shinpakusuu (Hokkaidou/Live) (2002)
- Shinpakusuu (Shikoku Area/Live) (2002)
- Shinpakusuu (Chuugoku Area/Live) (2002)
- Mikansei (2003)
- Bokuto Furyouto Kouteide (2003)
- Bi-Dama Scope (2004)
- Angela (2006)
- Mayonakano Boon Boon (2008)
- Heart of Winter (2008)
- Harumo Arashimo (2009)
- Hobo Walking (2009)
- Hanabi (2010)
- Taiyou No Yakusoku (2012)
- Aphrodite (2012)
- Altair No Namida (2013)
- I'm Home (2018)

=== Live albums ===
- One Knight Stands (2000)
- Transit Time (2002)
- With Strings (collaborated with Takayuki Hattori and Rush Strings, 2006)
- Concert at Suntory Hall (2011)
- Harvest ~ Live Seed Folks Special in Katsushika 2014 ~ (2015)

=== Cover albums ===
- Cover All Yo! (2007)
- Cover All Ho! (2007)

=== Compilation albums ===
- Blue Period (A-Side single collection, 2005)
- Out of the Blue (B-Side single collection, 2005)
- The Road to Yamazaki ~ the Best for beginners ~ (2013)
- Rose Period – The Best 2005–2015 (2015)

=== Live DVD ===
- Domino Round (1999)
- One Knight Stands on Films (2000)
- Concert at Suntory Hall (2011)
- One Knight Stands 2010–2011 on Films (2011)

== Filmography ==
- Shadowfall (2019), Shūichi Makabe
- Happiness (2024), Hideo Yamagishi
