= MTV Unplugged (Beni album) =

Live album by BENI
- Released: May 23, 2012
- Recorded: 2011
- Genres: Pop, R&B
- Label: Nayutawave Records

BENI chronology
COVERS (2012)	MTV Unplugged (2012)	COVERS2 (2012)

MTV Unplugged is the fourth live CD by singer Beni. The DVD contains footage of Beni's first MTV unplugged live.

== Track list: DVD ==
No.	Title	Length
1.	"Stardust"
2.	"Memory"
3.	"Dakishimete (抱きしめて, Hold me)"
4.	"Medley (Mou Nido to; もう二度と・・/ Koi Koregarete; 恋焦がれて / Sign; サイン / Zutto Futari De; ずっと二人で)"
5.	"Kiss Kiss Kiss"
6.	"Darlin'"
7.	"Sakuraza (桜坂)"
8.	"Hitomi Tojite (瞳をとじて, Close your Eyes)"
9.	"Suki Dakara (好きだから, I love you therefore)"
10.	"Kira Kira"
11.	"Unmei no Hito (運命の人, Person of Faith)"

== Track list: CD ==
No.	Title	Length
1.	"Stardust"
2.	"Memory"
3.	"Dakishimete (抱きしめて, Hold me)"
4.	"Medley (Mou Nido to;もう二度と・・/ Koi Koregarete;恋焦がれて / Sign;サイン / Zutto Futari De;ずっと二人で"
5.	"Kiss Kiss Kiss"
6.	"Darlin'"
7.	"Sakuraza (桜坂)"
8.	"Hitomi Tojite (瞳をとじて, Close your Eyes)"
9.	"Suki Dakara (好きだから, I love you therefore)"
10.	"Kira Kira"
11.	"Unmei no Hito (運命の人, Person of Faith)"

== Charts ==
Release	Chart	Peak position	First week sales	Sales total
January 25, 2012	Oricon Daily Charts	20		4,700
January 25, 2012	Oricon Weekly Charts	39	2,500	4,700
