= Covers (Beni album) =

Studio album by Beni
- Released: March 21, 2012; September 12, 2012 (Deluxe Edition)
- Recorded: 2011–2012
- Genre: Pop, R&B
- Language: English
- Label: Nayutawave Records; Universal Music Japan

Beni chronology
| Jewel Concert Tour (2012) | Covers (2012) | MTV Unplugged (2012) |

Covers is the first English-language cover album released by Beni Arashiro under her new label Universal Music Japan under the mononym Beni on March 21, 2012. This album contains cover songs from popular Japanese male singers in Japan. However, the original Japanese lyrics have been translated to English by Beni herself. The 13th song will be chosen by the fans through a request page. The song chosen by the fans is Naoto Inti Raymi's song "Ima no Kimi wo Wasurenai" Covers has been certified Gold by RIAJ for shipment of 100,000 copies. On 16 May, it was announced that Covers sold over 100,000 copies.making it Beni's highest ranked and best selling album so far. The website announced on 21 August, that a Deluxe version of "Covers" was going to be released on 12 September 2012. The new version would include a DVD with music video's and live video footage.

== Background ==
Covers is the first cover album released by BENI and first album recording in English since her debut. It is a Japanese to English cover album that includes covers of songs by Japanese male singers, translated from their original songs to this album. The song "Ti Amo" was released as digital single. In the 3rd week of the release of Covers, the album made the #3 spot on the Oricon charts while it made the #4 spot in the first week.

== Chart performance ==
The song "Ti Amo" debuted on the weekly Recochoku charts on #9. The album reached #1 in iTunes Japan and stayed #1 for 5 days. This is the first of Beni's album recorded in English but she did not plan to release the album in the US or any English speaking countries . In the first week, Covers got the weekly spot #7 on the Oricon chart. On 9 April, in the 3rd week after her release, Covers got the #2 spot on the daily oricon charts ranking. While in its first week of the release of the album, the highest daily Oricon ranking it got was #4. At the end of the 3rd chart week of Covers, the album ranked at #3. On April 18 it was announced Covers shipped already over 150,000 copies. And because of this success, the album would be released through iTunes in 51 countries. At the end of the 7th week, the album got the weekly Oricon spot #7, selling about 18,000 copies which was more than its opening week. In the 8th week of the release of the album, the album reached #1 on the daily Oricon ranking. The album became a huge success: ranking #2 on the Oricon weekly charts and selling even more copies than "Lovebox" (which ranked #1 on Oricon weekly charts).

== Track listing ==
All English translation by BENI, except noted.

CD
| No. | Title | Lyrics | Music | Arranger(s) | Length |
|---|---|---|---|---|---|
| 1. | "Ti Amo" (Exile cover) | Kiyoshi Matsuo, Seiji Motoyama (English translation) | Jin Nakamura, Kiyoshi Matsuo | Daisuke "D.I" Imai, Strings arranged by Ittetsu Gen | 5:43 |
| 2. | "La La La Love Song" (Toshinobu Kubota cover) | Toshinobu Kubota | Toshinobu Kubota | Shinichiro Murayama | 5:30 |
| 3. | "Hitomi wo Tojite (瞳をとじて, Close Your Eyes)" (Ken Hirai cover) | Ken Hirai, Sierra (English translation) | Ken Hirai | Shinichiro Murayama, Strings arranged by Daisuke Kadowaki | 5:40 |
| 4. | "Kanade (奏)" (Sukima Switch cover) | Takuya Ohashi & Shintaro Tokita, Yoko Hiji (English translation) | Takuya Ohashi & Shintaro Tokita | Shinichiro Murayama | 5:08 |
| 5. | "One More Time, One More Chance" (Masayoshi Yamazaki cover) | Masayoshi Yamazaki, Yoko Hiji (English translation) | Masayoshi Yamazaki | Shinichiro Murayama | 5:30 |
| 6. | "Robinson (ロビンソン)" (Spitz cover) | Masamune Kusano, Seiji Motoyama (English translation) | Masamune Kusano | Shinichiro Murayama | 4:14 |
| 7. | "Suddenly ~Love Story wa Totsuzen ni (Suddenly ~ラブ・ストーリーは突然に~, A Sudden Love Story)" (Kazumasa Oda cover) | Kazumasa Oda, Priscilla Coolidge | Kazumasa Oda | Shinichiro Murayama | 4:09 |
| 8. | "Mō Koi Nante Shinai (もう恋なんてしない, I'll Never Fall in Love Again)" (Noriyuki Makihara cover) | Noriyuki Makihara, Seiji Motoyama (English translation) | Noriyuki Makihara | Daisuke "D.I" Imai, Chikara "Ricky" Hazama | 4:31 |
| 9. | "Sakurazaka (桜坂)" (Masaharu Fukuyama cover) | Masaharu Fukuyama | Masaharu Fukuyama | Shinichiro Murayama, Strings arranged by Ittetsu Gen | 5:11 |
| 10. | "Koko ni Shika Sakanai Hana (ここにしか咲かない花, Flowers Only Bloom Here)" (Kobukuro cover) | Kentaro Kobuchi, Jeff Miyahara (English translation) | Kentaro Obuchi | Shinichiro Murayama | 6:11 |
| 11. | "Ima no Kimi wo Wasurenai (今のキミを忘れない, Won't Forget You In This Moment)" (Naoto Inti Raymi cover) | Naoto Inti Raymi, Seiji Motoyama (English translation) | Naoto Inti Raymi | Daisuke "D.I" Imai | 3:52 |
| 12. | "Itoshi no Erī (いとしのエリー, Dear Elie)" (Southern All Stars cover) | Keisuke Kuwata, Rumiko Varnes & Pete Hawkins (English translation) | Keisuke Kuwata | Daisuke "D.I" Imai | 4:13 |
| 13. | "True Love" (Fumiya Fujii cover) | Fumiya Fujii, Seiji Motoyama (English translation) | Fumiya Fujii | Shinichiro Murayama, Strings arranged by Ittetsu Gen | 3:50 |

DVD -Deluxe version-
| No. | Title | Length |
|---|---|---|
| 1. | "Ti Amo" (Music video) |
| 2. | "Hitomi wo Tojite" (Music video) |
| 3. | "La La La Love Song" (Live from Beni Concert Tour 2012 Fortune) |
| 4. | "Ti Amo" (Live from Beni Concert Tour 2012 Fortune) |

== Charts ==
Oricon Overall Sales Chart (Japan)

| Release | Chart | Peak position | Debut sales | Sales total | Chart run |
|---|---|---|---|---|---|
| March 21, 2012 | Oricon Daily Charts | 1 | | | |
| March 21, 2012 | Oricon Weekly Charts | 2 | 17,024 | | |
| March 21, 2012 | Oricon Monthly Charts | 6 | | | |
| March 21, 2012 | Oricon Yearly Charts | 27 | 215,682 | 224,313 | 44 weeks |

== Charts and certifications ==
=== Japan Charts ===
| Chart | Peak position |
|---|---|
| Oricon Daily Albums | 1 |
| Oricon Weekly Albums | 2 |
| Oricon Monthly Albums (Debut Month) | 13 |
| Oricon Monthly Albums (Overall) | 6 |
| Oricon Yearly Albums | |
| iTunes Album Chart (Japan) | 1 |
| Billboard Japan Top Albums | 2 |
| Billboard Japan Top Albums Yearly | |

== Oricon Charts ==
| Chart | Peak position | Reported sales |
|---|---|---|
| Oricon Daily Chart | 1 | |
| Oricon Weekly Chart | 2 | 17,000 |
| Oricon Monthly Chart (Debut Month) | 13 | 42,000 |
| Oricon Monthly Chart (Overall) | 6 | 43,000 |
| Oricon Yearly Chart | 27 | 215,000 |
| Oricon Sales Total | - | 224,000 |

=== Sales and certifications ===
| Country | Provider | Shipments | Certification | Japan | RIAJ | 250,000 | Platinum |
