= Covers: 2 =

Covers 2

Studio album by Beni
- Released: November 7, 2012
- Recorded: 2012
- Genres: Pop, R&B
- Language: English
- Labels: Nayutawave Records; Universal Music Japan

Beni chronology
MTV Unplugged (2012)	Covers 2 (2012)

Covers 2 is the second English-language cover album released by Beni Arashiro under her new label Universal Music Japan under the mononym Beni on November 7, 2012. This album handles the same concept of Covers, which featured Beni covering songs from popular Japanese male singers in Japan and translating the lyrics to English.

== Background ==
Covers 2 is the second cover album released by Beni. She recorded the album in Los Angeles, California. She performed a few of the songs at The Hotel Cafe, including "Uta Utai no Ballad", from which video footage was filmed and used in the music video of the song. "I Love You" was recorded in Los Angeles as well.

== Track listing ==
CD
No.	Title	Lyrics	Music	Length
1.	"Lovers again" (EXILE cover)	BENI, Seiji Motoyama）.	Jin Nakamura
2.	"Shiroi Koibitotachi (白い恋人達, White Lovers)" (Kuwata Keisuke cover)	Jeff Miyahara	Keisuke Kuwata
3.	"Uta Utai no Ballad (歌うたいのバラッド, Singing a Ballad song)" (Saito Kazuyoshi cover)	BENI	Kazuyoshi Saito
4.	"Pieces of A Dream" (Chemistry cover)	BENI, Geila Zilkha	Kazunori Fujimoto
5.	"Rakuen (楽園, Paradise)" (Ken Hirai cover)	BENI, Seiji Motoyama	Masahito Nakano
6.	"Cherii (チェリー, Cherry)" (Spitz cover)	BENI, Geila Zilkha	Masamune Kusano
7.	"Kurisumasu Eve (クリスマス・イブ, Christmas Eve)" (Yamashita Tatsuro cover)	Alan O'Day	Tatsuro Yamashita
8.	"Hajimari wa Itsumo Ame ( はじまりはいつも雨, The Beginning is Always Rain)" (ASKA cover)	BENI, Seiji Motoyama	Ryo Asuka
9.	"I LOVE YOU" (Ozaki Yutaka cover)	BENI, Leo Imai	Yutaka Ozaki
10.	"Chiisana Koi no Uta (小さな恋のうた, Small Love Song)" (MONGOL800 cover)	BENI, Seiji Motoyama	MONGOL800
11.	"Seppun Kiss (接吻, The Kiss)" (Original Love cover)	Seiji Motoyama	Takao Tajima
12.	"Towa Ni (永遠に, Forever)" (The Gospellers cover)	BENI, Seiji Motoyama	Takeshi Senoo
13.	"Squall" (Fukuyama Masaharu cover)	BENI, Geila Zilkha	Fukuyama Masaharu

DVD -Deluxe version-
No.	Title	Length
1.	"Lovers Again" (Music video)
2.	"Uta Utai no Ballad" (Music video)
3.	"I LOVE YOU" (Music Video)
4.	"PIECES OF A DREAM" (Music Video)

== Charts ==
Oricon Overall Sales Chart (Japan)

Release	Chart	Peak position	Debut sales	Sales total
November 7, 2012	Oricon Daily Charts	4	11,698	135,374
November 7, 2012	Oricon Weekly Charts	5	50,462	135,374
November 7, 2012	Oricon Monthly Charts	7	105,351	135,374
November 7, 2012	Oricon Yearly Charts	58	113,416	135,374
