= Jewel (Beni album) =

Studio album by Beni
- Released: December 8, 2010
- Recorded: 2010
- Genre: R&B
- Length: 50:31
- Language: Japanese
- Label: Nayutawave Records

Beni chronology
Lovebox (2010)	Jewel (2010)	Lovebox Live Tour (2011)

Alternative cover
- Limited CD+DVD cover

Singles from Jewel
- 1. "Heaven's Door" Released: August 11, 2010; 2. "2FACE" Released: November 24, 2010

Jewel is Beni's sixth studio album, and third original album under the mononym Beni released through Nayutawave Records. It was released on December 8, 2010.

== Background ==
The album was released only six months after her second album Lovebox. Lovebox managed to get the #1 weekly spot on the Oricon charts. This album however charted at the #11 spot on the Oricon Charts Weekly.

== Promotion ==
The song 2FACE was the ending theme for NTVs program HAPPY Music (ハッピーMUSIC). The song Heaven's Door was the opening theme for the national TV program CDTV. And the song Smile is the theme song for the commercial Home Mate (ホームメイト; Homu Meito).

== Track listing ==
CD
No.	Title	Lyrics	Music	Producer(s)	Length
1.	"Jewel Intro"	Beni	Daisuke "D.I" Imai	Imai	1:11
2.	"2FACE"	Beni	Imai	Imai	3:33
3.	"Toki o Tomete" (トキヲトメテ "Stop Time")	Beni	Imai	Imai	4:04
4.	"Daisuki na noni" (大好きなのに "Even Though I Love You")	Beni	Imai	Imai	4:00
5.	"Lovin'U"	Beni	Imai	Imai	4:11
6.	"Heaven's Door"	Kiyoshi Matsuo	Daisuke Kawaguchi	Kawaguchi, Strings arranged by Gen Ittetsu	4:54
7.	"See U Again"	Beni	HIRO	HIRO	4:19
8.	"First Time"	Beni	lil 'showy	lil 'showy	3:48
9.	"Heartbreaker"	Beni, Shoko Fujibayashi	Imai	Imai	3:49
10.	"Don't Let Go"	Beni	lil 'showy	lil 'showy	4:19
11.	"Smile"	Beni	Imai	Imai	4:01
12.	"Kimi to Nara" (君となら "If I'm With You")	Shoko Fujibayashi	3rd Productions	3rd Productions	4:05
13.	"Wasurenaide Ne" (忘れないでね "Don't Forget")	Beni, Yoko Hiji	Imai	Imai	4:14
Total length:					50:31

DVD
No.	Title	Length
1.	"2FACE" (Music video)
2.	"Heaven's Door" (Music video)
3.	"Lovebox Live Tour 2010" (Documentary)

== Charts ==
Chart	Peak position	Reported sales
Oricon Albums Daily Chart	7	
Oricon Albums Weekly Chart	11	26,000
