= Gem (album) =

GEM

Studio album by Beni Arashiro
- Released: 25 April 2007
- Genre: J-Pop
- Label: Avex Trax

Beni Arashiro chronology
Girl 2 Lady (2006)	GEM (2007)	Chapter One ~Complete Collection~ (2008)

GEM is the third album from Beni Arashiro on the Avex Trax label. This album has two versions: a CD-only version and a CD+DVD version. The DVD contains all of the promoting videos and a CECIL McBEE trailer. This was the last studio album Beni Arashiro released before she switched to label Universal Music Japan and her stage name to BENI.

The album charted on the #114 on the Oricon charts.

== Track listing ==
CD
No.	Title	Lyrics	Music	Arranger(s)	Length
1.	"BAD GIRL"	Beni, CMJK	CMJK	CMJK	4:05
2.	"Mermaid"	Haruka Mochizuki, Beni, AKI (rap)	Yanagiman	Yanagiman	5:14
3.	"Losin' control"	Haruka Mochizuki, Beni, Yanagiman	Shunsuke Minami	Yanagiman	3:20
4.	"Loved"	Yoko Kuzuya	Yoko Kuzuya	Yanagiman	5:26
5.	"Luna"	MC Renji, Yanagiman	Shunsuke Minami	CMJK	5:04
6.	"How Are U?"	Kenn Kato	Yanagiman	Yanagiman	4:35
7.	"Paradise"	Beni, Yanagiman	Yanagiman, Beni	Yanagiman	4:54
8.	"Mirror mirror"	CMJK	CMJK	CMJK	4:38
9.	"Sweet but Empty"	Shoko Fujibayashi	tasuku	tasuku	3:07
10.	"Koibumi (恋文, Love letter)" (Studio Live Version)	Yoko Kuzuya	Yoko Kuzuya	Yuta Nakano	4:03
11.	"No Pain, No Gain" (English Version)	Beni	Yanagiman	Yanagiman	4:21

DVD
No.	Title	Length
1.	"How Are U?" (Promotion Video)
2.	"Luna" (Promotion Video)
3.	"Koibumi" (Special Promotion Video)
4.	"CECIL McBEE" (Trailer)

== Charts ==
Release	Chart	Peak position
22 February 2006	Oricon Weekly Albums Chart	126

== Singles ==
Date	Title	Peak position
September 20, 2006	"How Are U?"	did not chart
February 28, 2007	"Luna"	77
