= Infinite (Beni Arashiro song) =

"Infinite..."

Single by Beni Arashiro

from the album Beni
- Released: October 20, 2004
- Genre: Pop
- Label: Avex Trax
- Songwriter(s): Takada Junpei, Haruka Mochizuki

Beni Arashiro singles chronology
"Harmony" (2004)	"Infinite..." (2004)	"Here Alone" (2004)

"Infinite..." is the second single by Japanese singer Beni Arashiro. It served as the outro theme for TBS's "Count Down TV" in October 2004.

== Track listing ==
1. Infinite...
2. Flower on the Earth
3. Eternal Flame (The Bangles cover)
4. Infinite... (Instrumental)
5. Flower on the Earth (Instrumental)

== Charts ==
Oricon Sales Chart (Japan)

Release	Chart	Peak Position	First Week Sales	Sales Total	Chart Run
20 October 2004	Oricon Weekly Singles Chart	#24	7,201	-	4 weeks
