= Sign (Beni song) =

Single by Beni

from the album Lovebox (Beni album)
- B-side: "Gon' Luv U" "Kira Kira (DJ Hasebe Remix)
- Released: January 20, 2010`
- Recorded: 2009
- Genre: Pop, R&B
- Length: 4:28
- Label: Nayutawave Records
- Songwriter(s): Beni, Masataka Yoshino
- Producer(s): 3rd Productions

Beni singles chronology
"Kira Kira" (2009)	"Sign" (2010)	""Bye Bye""

"Sign" (サイン, Sain) is Beni's sixth single under the label Nayutawave Records. The leading song contains a sample of the piano from Yumi Matsutoya's 1994 song "Haru yo, Koi". The first press bonus will include a BENIxMURUA collaborative interchangeable jacket and for a lucky group of fifty, they will be awarded with a BENIxMURUA collaborative T-shirt. The single charted at the weekly spot #50 and sold 1,596 copies.

== Track list ==
CD
No.	Title	Lyrics	Music	Arrangement	Length
1.	"Sign"	BENI, Yumi Matsutoya	BENI, Yumi Matsutoya	BENI, Yumi Matsutoya	4:28
2.	"Gon' Luv u"	BENI, Yumi Matsutoya	Daisuke Imai	Daisuke Imai	3:26
3.	"Kira Kira DJ Hasebe Remix"	Daisuke Imai, Huzibayashi Seiko	Daisuke Imai	DJ Hasebe	4:12
4.	"Sign (Instrumental)"	BENI, Yumi Matsutoya	BENI, Yumi Matsutoya	BENI, Yumi Matsutoya	4:28
