= Bye Bye (Beni song) =

Single by Beni

from the album Lovebox
- B-side: "Stylish"
- Released: March 10, 2010
- Recorded: 2010
- Genre: R&B
- Label: Nayutawave Records; Universal Music Japan
- Songwriter(s): Shoko Fujibayashi, Daisuke "D.I" Imai

Beni singles chronology
"Sign" (2010)	"Bye Bye" (2010)	"Yurayura/Gimme Gimme" (2010)

"Bye Bye" is Beni's seventh single under the label Nayutawave Records. The leading song is the ending theme for the program Hey! Hey! Hey! Music Champ. The single was ranked as #57 on the Oricon weekly chart and sold 1,171 copies so far.

== Track list ==
CD
No.	Title	Lyrics	Music	Length
1.	"Bye Bye"	Shoko Fujibayashi	Daisuke "D.I" Imai
2.	"Stylish"	BENI	Yoko Hiji, Daisuke "D.I" Imai
3.	"Sign DJ Hasebe Remix"	Beni, Masataka Yoshino	Beni, Yoshino, Yumi Matsutoya
4.	"Bye Bye (Instrumental)"	Fujibayashi	Imai
