= Here Alone =

Single by Beni Arashiro

from the album Beni
- Released: November 25, 2004
- Genre: Pop
- Label: Avex Trax
- Songwriters: JUSME, Hirofumi Asamoto
- Producers: Hirofumi Asamoto, CMJK, Tommie Conor

Beni Arashiro singles chronology
"Infinite..." (2004)	"Here Alone" (2004)	"Miracle" (2005)

"Here Alone" is Beni Arashiro's third single, which served as the outro theme for the TV ASAHI 45th Anniversary Special Drama, Kiyoharu Matsumoto’s "Kurokawa no Techo".

== Track listing ==
1. Here Alone
2. Song for love
3. I Saw Mommy Kissing Santa Claus
4. Here Alone(Instrumental)
5. Song for love(Instrumental)

== Charts ==
Oricon Sales Chart (Japan)

Release	Chart	Peak Position	First Week Sales	Sales Total	Chart Run
25 November 2004	Oricon Daily Singles Chart	-	-	-	
25 November 2004	Oricon Weekly Singles Chart	14	13,040 copies	35,115	-
25 November 2004	Oricon Monthly Singles Chart		-	-	
25 November 2004	Oricon Yearly Singles Chart				
