= Harmony (Beni Arashiro song) =

Single by Beni Arashiro

from the album Beni
- Released: June 9, 2004
- Genre: Pop
- Label: Avex Trax
- Songwriter(s): JUSME, MONK
- Producer(s): MONK, Hirofumi Asamoto,

Beni Arashiro singles chronology
"Harmony" (2004)	"Infinite..." (2004)

"Harmony" is Beni Arashiro's debut single, which served as the theme for TV ASAHI Friday Night's Drama "Rei-kan Bus Guide Jikenbo".

== Track listing ==
1. Harmony
2. Silhouette
3. Emotions
4. Harmony (Instrumental)
5. Silhouette (Instrumental)

== Charts ==
Oricon Sales Chart (Japan)

Release	Chart	Peak Position	First Week Sales	Sales Total	Chart Run
9 June 2004	Oricon Weekly Singles Chart	#26	6,503	10,753	5 weeks
