= Mō Ichi do... =

Single by Dohzi-T featuring Beni

from the album 12 Love Stories
- Released: June 11, 2008
- Genre: Japanese hip hop, J-pop
- Label: Universal Japan

Dohzi-T singles chronology
"One Love"" (2007)	"Mō Ichi do..." (2008)	"Ano Koro" (2009)

Beni singles chronology
"Luna" (2007)	"Mō Ichi do..." (2008)	"Mō Nido to..." (2008)

"Mō Ichi do..." (もう一度…, "Once More") is a double-A side single released by artist Dohzi-T. The main song is a collaboration song with Beni. The song sold over 2,000,000 ringtone downloads and was later released as a single. The single managed to reach the number seven spot weekly on the Oricon ranking and was a long charting hit selling over 80,000 copies. The single is ranked as #93 on the yearly Oricon chart.

== Track listing ==
1. Mō Ichi do... (feat. Beni)
2. One Love feat. Shota Shimizu ('08 ver.)
3. Mō Ichi do... (Instrumental)
4. One Love (Instrumental)
