= Eien (Beni song) =

Single by Beni
- Released: 25 January 2012
- Recorded: 2011
- Genre: Pop, R&B
- Label: Nayutawave Records
- Songwriters: Beni, 3rd Productions

Beni singles chronology
"Darlin'" (2011)	"Eien" (2012)

"Eien" (永遠) is the fourteenth single by Japanese singer Beni. It was scheduled to be released on 25 January 2012 on the Nayutawave Records label. "Eien" is a wedding song, and was scheduled to be the theme song for the NHK TV series Honjitsu wa Taian Nari which starts on 10 January 2012. The video for the lead song was recorded in Los Angeles, USA. On the recochoku weekly online charts "Eien" debuted at #7.

== Track list ==
CD
No.	Title	Lyrics	Music	Length
1.	"Eien (永遠; Eternity)"	Beni	3rd Productions
2.	"Saigo no Uso (最後の嘘; The Last Lie)"	BENI	Yoko Kuzuya
3.	"Eien (Instrumental)"
4.	"Saigo no Uso (Instrumental)"

== Charts ==
Chart	Peak position
Oricon singles daily chart	44
Oricon weekly singles	75

=== Reported sales ===
Chart	Amount
Oricon physical sales	1,000
