= Bitter & Sweet (album) =

Studio album by Beni
- Released: September 2, 2009
- Recorded: 2008–2009
- Genre: Pop, R&B
- Language: Japanese
- Label: Nayutawave Records; Universal Music Japan

Beni chronology
Chapter One: Complete Collection (2008)	Bitter & Sweet (2009)	Bitter & Sweet Release Tour Final (2010)

Alternative cover
- CD+DVD Cover

Bitter & Sweet is the first album released by Beni Arashiro under her new label Universal Music Japan and her new stage name, Beni on September 2, 2009. The CD+DVD version is a limited edition with all her single PVs and two new PVs named "The Boy Is Mine", which features Tynisha Keli, and "Superstar" which are both cover songs. The vocals for the DJ Hasebe Remix of "Kiss Kiss Kiss" were recorded from one of her live performances. The song "Dakishimete", featuring Dohzi-T, was released on 19 August as an online download on Recochoku's Chaku Uta. The song debuted on the #5 place on the Chaku-Uta charts and the #2 place on the Recochoku chart. The album debuted at the #6 place on the Oricon chart. The day after it rose to the #5 place. At the end of the first week, the album ended up on the #5 spot on the weekly chart selling about 30,000 copies making it Beni's highest ranked and best selling album to date. She went on a release club tour. The tour was named Bitter&Sweet RELEASE TOUR. The tour was so successful that new tour dates were added. Bitter & Sweet has been certified Gold by RIAJ for shipment of 100,000 copies. On 28 December, it was announced that Bitter & Sweet sold over 100,000 copies.

== Track listing ==
CD
No.	Title	Lyrics	Music	Arranger(s)	Length
1.	"Bitter & Sweet: Intro"
2.	"Kiss Kiss Kiss"	Shoko Fujibayashi, Daisuke "D.I" Imai	Imai	Imai	4:19
3.	"Zutto Futari de (ずっと二人で, Always Together)"	Beni, Masataka Yoshino	Beni, Yoshino	Imai, Strings arranged by Ittetsu Gen	4:35
4.	"Koi Kogarete (恋焦がれて, I'm in Love with You)"	Beni, Fujibayashi	Imai	Imai
5.	"Dakishimete feat. Dohzi-T (抱きしめて feat. 童子-T, Hold Me)"	Beni, Dohzi-T	3rd Productions		5:08
6.	"Anything Goes!!"	Beni	Imai	Imai	03:43
7.	"Stardust"	Fujibayashi	Imai	Imai	4:23
8.	"Kira Kira (Kira☆Kira☆)"	Fujibayashi, Imai	Imai	Imai	4:10
9.	"Go On"	Beni	Shingo. S		4:06
10.	"Shinjisasete (信じさせて, Make Me Believe)"	Beni	3rd Productions		4:38
11.	"Nice & Slow"	Beni	Imai	Imai	4:30
12.	"Stay"	Beni, Fujibayashi	Imai	Imai	4:40
13.	"Beautiful World"	Beni	Imai	Imai	4:51
14.	"Mō Nido to... (もう二度と・・・, Never Again...)"	Beni, Dohzi-T	Dohzi-T, Shingo. S		5:50
15.	"Kiss Kiss Kiss (DJ Hasebe Remix)" (Bonus track)	Fujibayashi, Imai	Imai	Imai, DJ Hasebe (remix)	5:09

DVD: Music videos
No.	Title	Length
1.	"Mō Nido to..."
2.	"Kiss Kiss Kiss"
3.	"Koi Kogarete"
4.	"Zutto Futari de"
5.	"Superstar"
6.	"The Boy is Mine feat. Tynisha Keli"

== Charts ==
Release	Chart	Peak Position	First Week Sales	Sales Total	Chart Run
September 2, 2009	Oricon Daily Charts	1	13,000	1,300,000	130 weeks
September 2, 2009	Oricon Weekly Charts	1	130,000	1,300,000	130 weeks
September 2, 2009	Oricon Monthly Charts	1	1,295,400	1,300,000	130 weeks
September 2, 2009	Oricon Yearly Charts	1	1,300,000	1,300,000	130 weeks
