= Koe o Kikasete / Crazy Girl =

"Koe wo Kikasete"

Single by Beni
- Released: September 14, 2011
- Recorded: 2011
- Genre: Pop, R&B
- Length: 5:13 (Koe wo Kikasete); 3:54 (Crazy Girl)
- Label: Nayutawave Records
- Songwriter(s): Koe o Kikasete: BENI, Masataka Yoshino; Crazy Girl:BENI, lil 'showy

Beni singles chronology
"Suki Dakara" (2011)	"Koe wo Kikasete" (2011)	"Darlin'" (2011)

"Koe wo Kikasete / Crazy Girl" (声を聞かせて) is Beni's twelfth single under the label Nayutawave Records. "Koe wo Kikasete" is an unrequited love song that describes the feeling of a woman who is asking the one she loves: "who are you thinking about?". The other A-side is named "Crazy Girl" is an upbeat song that is meant to dance to.

== Track list ==
CD
No.	Title	Lyrics	Music	Length
1.	"Koe wo Kikasete (声を聞かせて; Let Me Hear Your Voice)"	BENI	BENI, Masataka Yoshino	5:10
2.	"Crazy Girl"	BENI	lil 'showy	3:54
3.	"Koe wo Kikasete (Instrumental)"			5:04
4.	"Crazy Girl (Instrumental)"			3:49
