= Heaven's Door (song) =

Single by Beni

from the album Jewel
- B-side: "I Like It"
- Released: August 11, 2010
- Recorded: 2010
- Genre: Pop, R&B
- Label: Nayutawave Records
- Songwriter(s): Kiyoshi Matsuo, Daisuke Kawaguchi

Beni singles chronology
"Yurayura/Gimme Gimme" (2010)	"Heaven's Door" (2010)	"2Face" (2010)

"Heaven's Door" is Beni's ninth single under the label Nayutawave Records. "Heaven's Door" is a "happy feeling mid-tempo wedding track". With this single came the promotion for Beni's wedding dress line named Rouge de Beni. The first press edition includes a photobook of Rouge de Beni.

== Track list ==
CD
No.	Title	Lyrics	Music	Length
1.	"Heaven's Door"	Kiyoshi Matsuo	Daisuke Kawaguchi	4:57
2.	"I Like It"	Beni	Daisuki "D.I." Imai	3:12
3.	"Gimme Gimme (DJ Hasebe Remix)"	Shoko Fujibayashi, Daisuke "D.I" Imai	DJ Hasebe	3:58
4.	"Heaven's Door (Instrumental)"			4:55

== Charts ==
Chart	Peak position
Oricon singles daily chart	27
Oricon weekly singles	49

=== Reported sales ===
Chart	Amount
Oricon physical sales	3,000
