= Orion Breweries =

Beer brewery in Japan

Orion Breweries, Ltd.

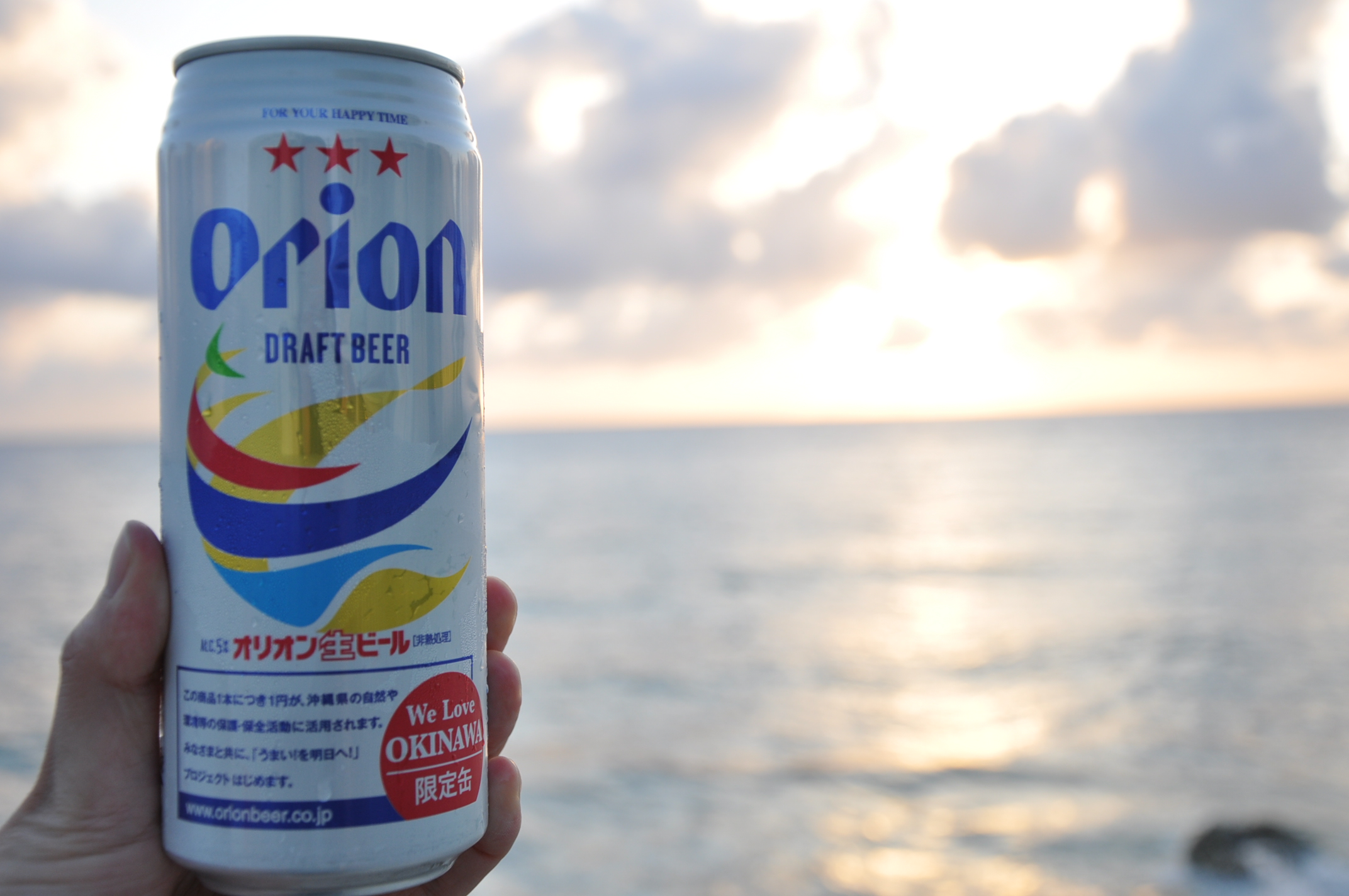
- Native name: オリオンビール株式会社
- Type: Public
- Traded as: TYO: 409A
- Industry: Beverage
- Founded: May 18, 1957; 69 years ago
- Founder: Sosei Gushiken
- Headquarters: Tomigusuku, Okinawa Prefecture 901-0225, Japan
- Area served: Japan; Asia; United States
- Key people: Hajime Murano (President and CEO)
- Products: Beer; Soft drinks
- Number of employees: 295 (as of March 2021)
- Parent: Ocean Holdings Co., Ltd.
- Website: Official website (in Japanese)

Orion Breweries, Ltd. (Japanese: オリオンビール株式会社, Hepburn: Orion Bīru Kabushiki-gaisha) is the fifth-largest beer brewery in Japan, headquartered in Tomigusuku, Okinawa Prefecture. The company commands approximately 1% of the Japanese beer market, and 60% of the Okinawan beer market.

== History ==
Founded in 1957 in Nago, Okinawa, during the US occupation of Okinawa, Orion began making beer in 1959. Orion struggled to compete with the other major Japanese breweries, but after changing from a German-style beer to an American-style beer, it gained the top share in the Okinawan market. Up until 2002, it had a market that was limited mostly to Okinawa. Since 2002, Orion partnered with Asahi Breweries to manufacture Asahi beers in Okinawa, in return for Asahi's assistance in selling Orion beer outside of Okinawa. Asahi owns 10% of Orion Breweries.

In January 2019, Nomura Holdings and The Carlyle Group entered talks to acquire Orion Breweries and help the beer brand expand in the US and Asia. On May 14, 2019, Orion entered the chūhai market with the release of the WATTA chūhai brand, using traditional Okinawan flavors. In July 2019, Keiju Hayase was appointed president and CEO of Orion Breweries.

In 2020, Orion Breweries stopped the production and distribution of its 9% ABV beer, Watta Strong, in a move to fight alcoholism, the first major brewery in Japan to make a move in this direction.

Keiju Hayase stepped down as president and CEO of Orion Breweries in June 2021 for personal reasons. Hajime Murano was appointed in his place in December 2021.

Orion Breweries became a public company in September 2025 through an initial public offering on the Tokyo Stock Exchange.

== Description ==
Orion uses water that comes from springs out of the mountain near the brewery. The brewery imports its malt from Germany, and uses German Hallertau and Czech Saaz hops. The brand is known by the US military personnel stationed in Okinawa. The company's sales outside of Japan make up 5% of its sales. In 2017, Orion Breweries recorded sales of 28.3 billion yen.

In South Korea, Orion beer is marketed under the brand name Okinawa.

Orion beer sponsors the Okinawan wrestler Menso-re Oyaji. Akihito Yagi, 8th Dan in Meibukan Goju Ryu Karate-do, which his late grandfather (Meitoku Yagi) created, and the current chairman of the International Meibukan Goju Ryu Karate Association (IMGKA), is a spokesman for Orion beer.

== Products ==
- Draft beer
- 75 Beer Premium Series Pilsner
- 75 Beer Premium Series IPA
- 75 Beer Craft Lager
- 75 Beer Weizen
Example products of Orion Breweries
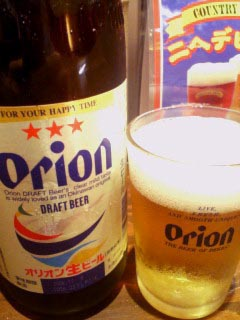
Orion Premium Draft poured into an Orion-branded cup (2006)

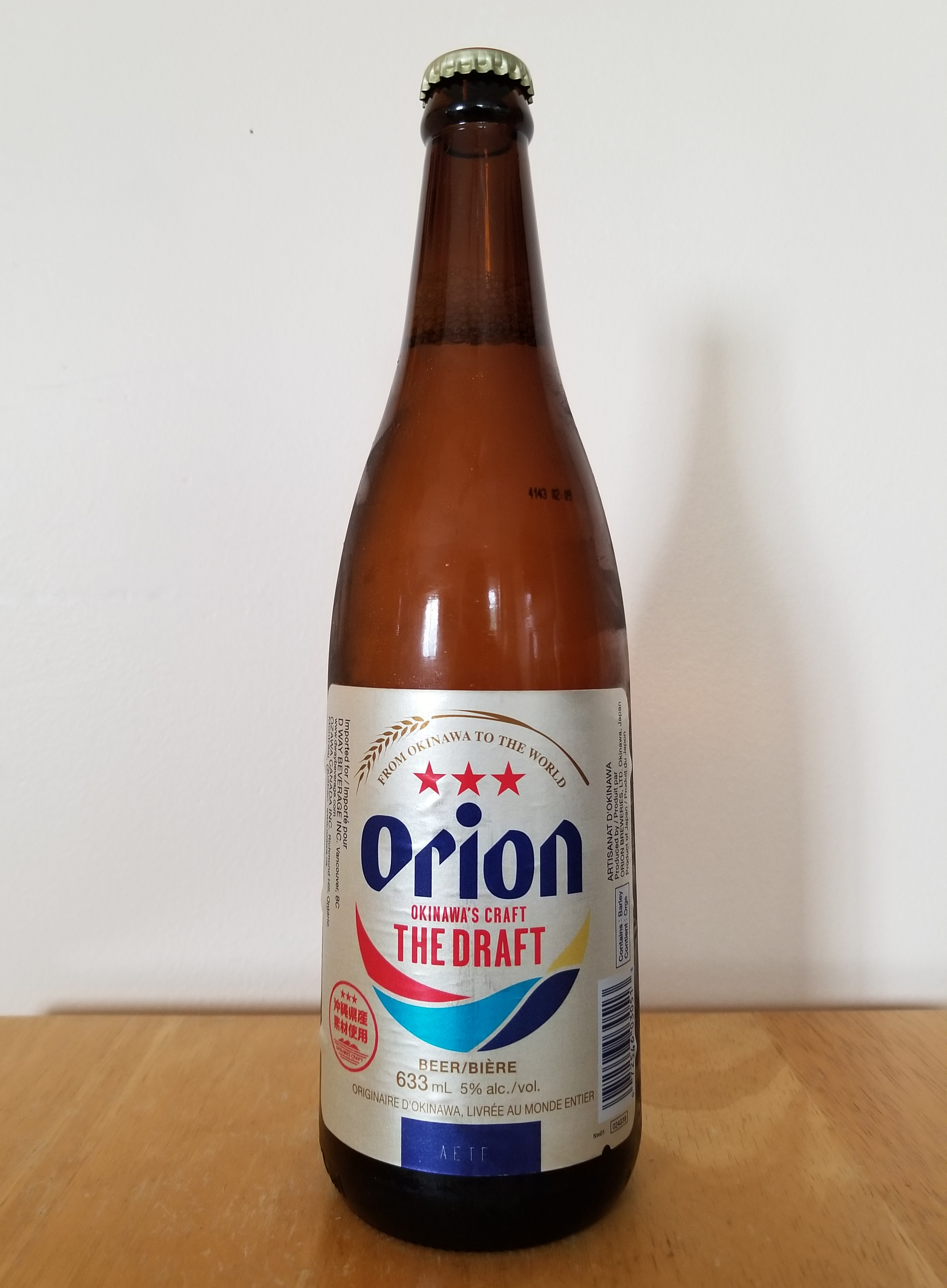
633 mL bottle of Orion Premium Draft (2025)

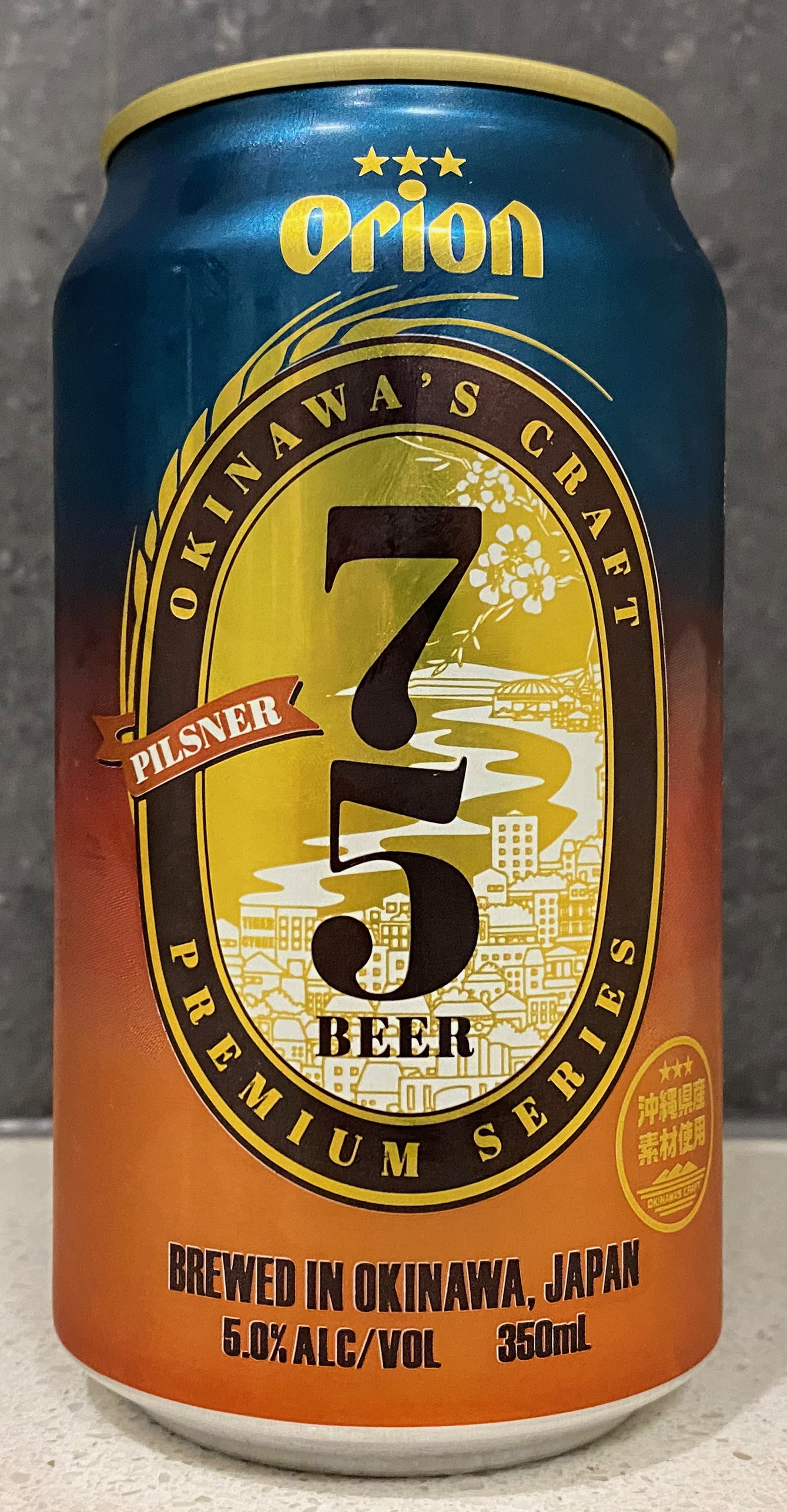
A 350 mL can of Orion's Pilsner Beer (2023)

== In popular culture ==
In one episode of Wakakozake, the main character Wakako tries out different restaurants to pair foods with drinks, and pairs goya chanpuru with Orion beer.
