= Dohzi-T =

Japanese rapper, singer and songwriter

Dohzi-T 童子-T
- Born: Mitsuru Takesue 竹末 充 May 13, 1969 (age 57)
- Origin: Japan
- Genres: J-pop, hip hop
- Occupations: Singer; songwriter; rapper
- Years active: 1989–present
- Labels: Atomic Boom (2001); Universal Music (2002–2003, 2005–present); Sony Music Records (2004–2005)
- Website: Official website (in Japanese); Universal Music profile (in Japanese)

Dohzi-T (童子-T, Dōji Tī; born Mitsuru Takesue (竹末 充, Takesue Mitsuru), May 13, 1969) is a Japanese rapper, singer and songwriter who has been active since 1989.

== Biography ==
Dohzi-T belonged to hip hop band "Zingi", formed in 1990. He debuted as a solo singer with the single "Shōnen A" (lit. "Boy A") on October 10, 2001. He associated with popular singers such as Shota Shimizu, Miliyah Kato and Hiromi Go. Since he has long career in Japan, he is called "Brother Dohzi" by other musicians. He is also known for his ability to find new singers. Dohzi-T and DJ Bass were featured in Ayumi Hamasaki's song "Nothing from Nothing", released by Nippon Columbia on September 21, 1995. However, Hamasaki soon left from the record label and became a pop singer under Avex Trax. In January 2008, he collaborated with Thelma Aoyama in a song "This Day" on her CD single "Soba ni Iru ne". In June 2008, he released his single "Mō Ichi do...", featuring Beni. It sold over two million ringtone downloads. Soon after "Mō Ichi Do..." released an album named 12 Love Stories including "Mō Ichi do..." as well as other collaboration songs with YU-A (from Foxxi misQ), Thelma Aoyama, Juju and many more. The album was ranked as No. 3 on the weekly Oricon chart making it Dohzi-T's highest ranked album.

== Discography ==
=== Albums ===
1. 2003 April 2 – Daisan no Otoko
2. 2005 February 23 – Doumu
3. 2007 August 29 – ONE MIC #33 on Oricon
4. 2008 September 24 – 12 Love Stories #3 on Oricon
5. 2009 December 16 – 4 ever
6. 2010 December 9 – Gold
7. 2011 November 30 – 12 Love Stories 2

=== Collaborations ===
1. 2008 June 11 – "Mō Ichi do..." #7 on Oricon
2. 2009 September 2 – Dakishimete feat. Dohzi-T (Beni - Bitter & Sweet) #5 on Oricon
