= Zutto Futari de =

Single by Beni

Single by Beni

from the album Bitter & Sweet
- Released: August 12, 2009
- Genre: J-Pop, R&B
- Label: Universal Japan

Beni singles chronology
| "Koi Kogarete" (2009) | "Zutto Futari de" (2009) | "Kira Kira" (2009) |

"Zutto Futari de" is the fourth single by Beni on the Universal Japan label. The leading song is a theme song for Recochoku as well as the program UtaSta while "With U" is an Orion Beer commercial song and the theme song for Go! Shiodome Jamboree Wasshoi 2009. The leading song Zutto Futari de debuted on 15 July 2009, at the #2 place on the Recochoku download. The second day the song rose to the #1 position. After three days the song went back to its #2 place. It was later announced that the official track list of the single would include a cover of "The Boy Is Mine" featuring Tynisha Keli.

== Track listing ==
1. Zutto Futari de (ずっと二人で; Always the Two of Us)
2. stardust
3. With U
4. The Boy is Mine feat. Tynisha Keli

== Charts ==
| Wed | Thu | Fri | Sat | Sun | Mon | Tue | Week rank | Sales |
|---|---|---|---|---|---|---|---|---|
| 34 | 43 | 46 | - | - | - | - | 67 | 1,251 |

Total Reported Sales:1,251
