= Yurayura/Gimme Gimme =

"Yura Yura/Gimme Gimme"

Single by Beni

from the album Lovebox
- Released: May 5, 2010
- Recorded: 2010
- Genre: R&B
- Label: Nayutawave Records; Universal Music Japan
- Songwriter(s): Beni, Shoko Fujibayashi, Daisuke "D.I" Imai

Beni singles chronology
"Bye Bye" (2010)	"Yura Yura/Gimme Gimme" (2010)	"Heaven's Door" (2010)

"Yura Yura/Gimme Gimme♥" (ユラユラ / ギミギミ♥, Swaying/Gimme Gimme) is Beni's eight single under the label Nayutawave Records. The song "Yurayura" is about the "wavering feelings you have after a break and how you want to move on", the song is supposed to be the new signature song. "Gimme Gimme" is the new Kao Biore Body Deli commercial song and is about "confessing your feelings to the one you love".

== Track list ==
CD
No.	Title	Lyrics	Music	Length
1.	"Yura Yura"	Beni	Daisuke "D.I" Imai
2.	"Gimme Gimme♥"	Shoko Fujibayashi, Imai	Imai
3.	"Bye Bye DJ Hasebe Remix"	Fujibayashi	Imai, DJ Hasebe
4.	"Yura Yura (Instrumental)"
5.	"Gimme Gimme♥ (Instrumental)"

== Charts ==
Chart	Peak position
Oricon singles daily chart	10
Oricon weekly singles	20
Billboard Japan Hot 100	25
RIAJ Digital Track Chart Top 100	18; 16*

*Chart position for "Gimme Gimme."

=== Reported sales ===
Chart	Amount
Oricon physical sales	5,200
