= Kiss Kiss Kiss (Beni song) =

Single by BENI

from the album Bitter & Sweet
- Released: April 8, 2009
- Genre: R&B
- Label: Universal Japan
- Songwriters: Fujibayashi, Imai

BENI singles chronology
"Mō Nido to..." (2008)	"Kiss Kiss Kiss" (2009)	"Koi Kogarete" (2009)

"Kiss Kiss Kiss" is the second single by the artist BENI (formerly known as Beni Arashiro) under the label Universal Japan. The song was the theme song for the Kao Biore Body Deli CM it also was the theme song for Recochoku. The song is described as a youthful love song.

The single peaked at number 40 on the Oricon charts and hit the #1 spot on the Chaku Uta Full chart for six days. The single was ranked #1 on the weekly Chaku Uta chart.

== Track listing ==
1. Kiss Kiss Kiss
2. Signal
3. Mou Nido To… DJ HASEBE REMIX
4. Kiss Kiss Kiss (Instrumental)

== Chart rankings ==
=== Oricon Charts (Japan) ===
Release	Chart	Peak position	First week sales	Sales total	Chart run
April 8, 2009	Oricon Daily Singles Chart	23			
April 8, 2009	Oricon Weekly Singles Chart	40	1,740	5,345	6 weeks
April 8, 2009	Oricon Yearly Singles Chart				

=== Various charts ===
Chart	Peak position
RIAJ Digital Track Chart Top 100	1
