= Koi Kogarete =

"恋焦がれて"

Single by Beni

from the album Bitter & Sweet
- Released: June 10, 2009
- Genre: J-Pop, R&B
- Label: Universal Japan
- Songwriter(s): Beni, Fujibayashi, Imai

Beni singles chronology
"Kiss Kiss Kiss" (2009)	"恋焦がれて" (2009)	"Zutto Futari de" (2009)

"Koi Kogarete" is the third single from Beni under the label Universal Japan. The song is described as the ultimate romantic love song for the summer. The song is a med-tempo that will make sure to those with one sided loves cry, a real signature song.

Although the single didn't chart in the weekly top 50 of the Oricon charts, it did quite well on the Recochoku chart debuting on the #3 place.

== Track listing ==
1. Koi Kogarete (恋焦がれて; Yearning for Love)
2. Cruise the World
3. Forever 21
4. 恋焦がれて（Instrumental）

== Charts ==
Daily	Weekly	Sales
42	70	1,266
