= Beni (singer) =

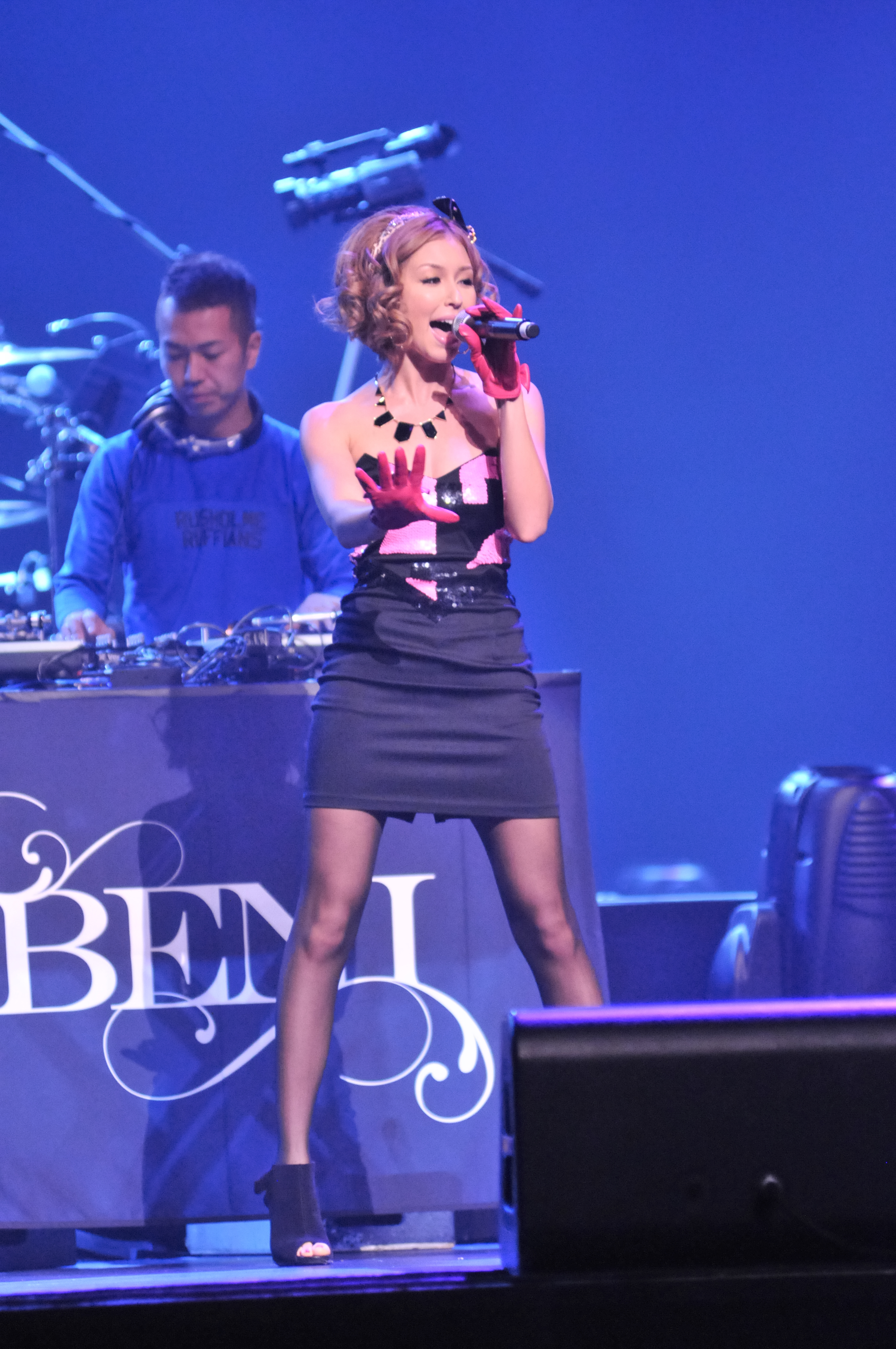
- Beni in July 2010
- Born: March 30, 1986 (age 40); Okinawa Prefecture, Japan
- Other names: Beni; Beni Arashiro
- Occupations: Singer; actress; model; TV personality
- Years active: 2004–present
- Musical career
- Genres: Pop; R&B
- Instruments: Vocals; Piano
- Labels: Avex Trax; Nayutawave; EMI; Universal Sigma; USM Japan
- Website: benibenibeni.com

Beni Arashiro (安良城 紅, Arashiro Beni; born March 30, 1986 in Okinawa Prefecture) is a Japanese R&B singer, who debuted in 2004 under the Avex Trax label. In 2008, Arashiro left Avex Trax and transferred to Nayutawave Records under Universal Music Japan where she started to perform as simply Beni (stylized as BENI).

She was initially best known for her 2004 single "Here Alone," though later singles after her move to Universal (such as "Mō Ichi do..." with Dohzi-T, "Mō Nido to..." and "Kiss Kiss Kiss") have surpassed this initial hit.

== Life and career ==
=== Start of her career ===
Born in Okinawa, she moved to San Diego, California and then Yokohama. Her mother is Japanese and her father is American of European descent. She was influenced by Namie Amuro, Alicia Keys and her father's favorite singer Janet Jackson. She graduated from Nile C. Kinnick High School in Yokosuka Naval Base, Japan. She majored in Sociology at Sophia University.

From a young age she wanted to become a singer and because of her musical parents she took up piano. Because her parents were living overseas she was traveling between Japan and America a lot which exposed her to both Japanese as well as overseas music. When she was in Japan she participated in the Kokuminteki Bishōjo Contest the largest talent contest. She made it all the way to the finals. This was quite special since she had no formal training. When her demotape was seen by Avex Trax they were so impressed by her clear voice, natural beauty, and English pronunciation that they decided to sign her to the label and prepare her for a debut. She became a member of Bishōjo Club 31. Beni was the first from the group to pursue a solo career while being active as a member of the group. Her first solo single named "Harmony" was released on June 9, 2004. The song "Harmony" was a theme song for the Japanese drama Reikan Bus Guide Jikenbo.

=== 2004–2005: Rising popularity and first album ===
Her second single named "Infinite..." showcased a different side of Beni. The song had a more R&B tune and Beni showed dance skills in the music video. The song "Infinite..." was also an intro song for the music TV program Count Down TV in October 2004.

Her third single, released November 25, was "Here Alone" from which the leading song was the ending song for the popular Japanese drama Kurokawa no Techo. Although the single wasn't a hit, the song itself was a hit. A few months after "Here Alone", an album named Beni and single named "Miracle" were released on February 9, 2005. Although the single charted low, the album was well received because of the variations in music styles and vocal range. After her album release, she won at the 19th Japan Gold Disc Awards the title "New Artist of the Year".

=== 2005–2006: Decline in sales and Girl 2 Lady ===
Because of her popularity, she got a contract with KOSE to promote KOSE's new VISE line of makeup. In the first official CM her new single song was promoted named "Hikari no Kazu dake Glamorous". The single also included a cover of Christina Milian's "Call Me, Beep Me!" which is the theme song for Disney's popular animated series, Kim Possible. The music video was not only promoted in the US, but also in 68 counties worldwide. However the single charted at the No. 40 place on the Oricon chart. She also became the face of Glico confectionery.

Nearly 6 months later, her 6th single "Cherish" was released. The leading song "Cherish" served as theme song for NTV's Ongaku Senshi MUSIC FIGHTER and POWER PLAY. The B-side song named "Goal" was used as the third ending theme song for Eyeshield 21. Two months later, on February 22, 2006 (a year after debut album Beni), her second album named Girl 2 Lady was released. The album was promoted by the 2nd KOSE VISEE CM song "FLASH" which was a digital release. The album however reached the No. 87 spot on the Oricon. Shortly after the release, she started playing in an Andrew Lloyd Webber play named The Beautiful Game in Japan. In the musical, she was the female heroine.

=== 2006–2008: Gem, first live tour and compilation album ===
Because of her participation in the musical, it took a long time for Beni to release new material. When the musical stopped touring in 2006, she began modeling as the face of Cecil McBee, one of the largest and most popular Japanese clothing lines that appeals to teenage and college girls. She was also the host of the NHK fashion program, Tokyo Kawaii TV, where Beni discusses the latest fashion trends in Japan. When she became the face of Orion Beer a new single was announced to be released on September 20. Her seventh single was named How Are U?. This single was her first single not to chart on the Oricon chart and is considered a total flop. Her eighth single named Luna was an ending theme song for the Japanese drama Warui Yatsura. This single charted at the No. 77 spot making it a small comeback from Beni. On April 25, 2007, Beni released her third studio album named Gem. The album charted at the No. 114 place on the Oricon chart.

Shortly after the album's release, she went on her first one-man live tour. After the tour, it was announced that Beni would make a movie debut in a movie called Bra Bra Ban Ban to be released nationwide in theater in March. She would also sing the theme song for the movie that would be released as a single. However, the official website removed the single and replaced it by a Greatest Hit album named Chapter One: Complete Collection. The DVD included a digest of her first live tour.

=== 2008–2011: Going from Beni Arashiro to Beni ===
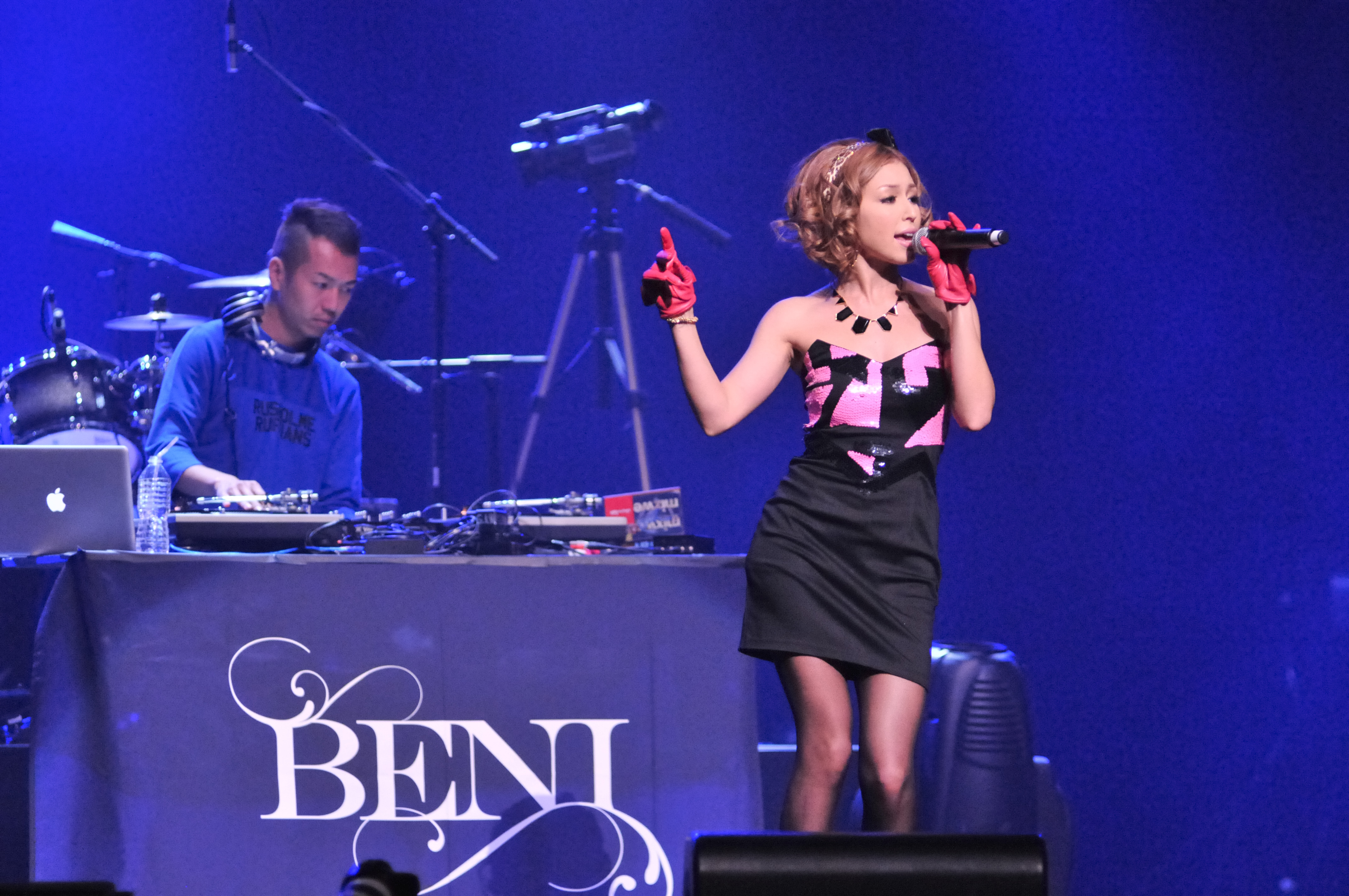
Singer Beni (also known as Beni Arashiro) performing at Anime Expo 2010

In June 2008, Japanese rapper Dohzi-T featured her in the song "Mō Ichi do...," which sold over two million ringtone downloads. In October 2008, it was announced that she left her label Avex Trax and moved to Universal Music Japan and she would write her own songs. At the same time, she changed her stage name to Beni and suspended her acting career. Her first single in Universal, "Mō Nido to...," was her answer song to "Mō Ichi do...". The digital download for the song started on November 12 and debuted at No. 1 on the Recochoku ringtone daily rankings. The official PV began to be aired on November 28 on YouTube. It ranked at No. 1 on the YouTube favourite music video ranking in Japan at the first week. The physical CD, released on December 10, 2008, was charted at No. 20 on Oricon.

Her next single, "Kiss Kiss Kiss", was released on April 8, 2009. Despite the fact that it ranked at the No. 40 spot on the Oricon ranking, the song hit the No. 1 spot for weekly full-track download sales on the RIAJ Digital Track Chart. Her single "Koi Kogarete" was released on June 10. The single features the theme song for the clothing brand Forever 21. Although the song debuted at the No. 9 place on the RIAJ Digital Track Chart, the single charted at the No. 70 place on the weekly chart of the Oricon charts. On August 12, 2009, "Zutto Futari de" was released. The single included an Orion beer commercial song named "With U". The song debuted at No. 6 on the RIAJ Digital Track Chart, but the single charted at the No. 67 place on the Oricon weekly charts.

BENI's new album named Bitter & Sweet was released on September 2, 2009. The album ranked No. 5 on the weekly Oricon chart selling about 30,000 copies in the first week, making it one of Beni's highest ranked and best sold album. Bitter & Sweet was certified Gold by RIAJ for shipment of 100,000 copies. She went on a club tour named Bitter & Sweet Release Tour. The tour was so successful that new tour dates were added. On October 9, Beni's official website announced a limited re-cut single named "KIRA☆KIRA☆" to be released on November 11.

On December 16, Beni's official website announced a new single named "Sign." With it came the collaboration with the popular brand MURUA. One week after the release of "Sign" a new single was announced. The single was named "Bye Bye" and would be the outro theme for the TV series Hey! Hey! Hey! Music Champ. Along came the album release of her Bitter & Sweet Tour named Bitter & Sweet Release Tour Final which also contains a DVD of the tour. Both were released on March 10, 2010. On April 15, Beni's official website announced a double a-side single named "Yurayura/Gimme Gimme." The song "Gimme Gimme" would serve as the new Kao Biore Body Deli commercial song. The single reached the No. 20 spot on the Oricon weekly chart which is, next to her single "Mō Nido to...", the highest Oricon single ranking Beni got since she moved the Universal label. After the successful chart of "Yurayura/Gimme Gimme" on the Oricon chart, Beni's official website announced her second studio album named Lovebox which was released on June 2, 2010. Lovebox debuted at No. 1 on the Oricon weekly charts, becoming her first album to get the No. 1 spot on the weekly charts.

On July 7, 2010, it was announced that BENI would release a new single named "Heaven's Door". With the single came the promotion for BENI's own wedding dress line named Rouge de BENI which she all designed by herself. The single was released on August 11, 2010. On October 8, BENI started her Lovebox 2010 tour accompanied with Rouge de BENI. On October 15, BENI's official website announced a limited single named 2FACE to be released on November 24. According to Beni's blog, this song should showcase a New Beni.

On November 5, Beni's official website announced a third studio album named "Jewel" to be released on December 8, 2010. On February 9, 2011, Beni's official website announced the release of her second live album Lovebox Live Tour that contains a DVD with live footage.

=== 2011–present ===
After the release of Lovebox Live Tour, Beni planned to go on tour to promote Jewel from the end of March till the end of April. However the tour got postponed due to the 2011 earthquake and tsunami in Japan and so started at the end of June. On 9 May, Beni's official website announced a new single named "Suki Dakara" which was released on June 8, 2011. Though the single wasn't physically selling strong, it did pretty well on the online downloads. On August 16, Beni's official website announced a new double A-side single named "Koe wo Kikasete / Crazy Girl" to be released on September 14. Again it charted well on the online downloads. Very quickly a new single was announced named "Darlin'" and was set to release on October 12. The song would serve as the new Kansai Collection theme song. And very quickly after that it was announced her 4th album named "Fortune" would be released on November 2.

On December 7, Beni's website announced the release of her 3rd Live album named "Jewel Concert Tour" and a new single named "Eien". Both were released on January 25, 2012. On February 6, 2012, Beni's official website announced that Beni would release her first English cover album named Covers. The album contains English covers from Japanese songs from popular Japanese male artists. The album became a huge success: ranking #2 on the Oricon weekly charts and selling even more copies then "Lovebox" (which ranked No. 1 on Oricon weekly charts) and her debut album "Bitter & Sweet". On April 18, 2012, Beni's official website announced another live album named "MTV Unplugged" to be released on 23 May. The website announced on August 21, that a Deluxe version of Covers was going to be released on September 12, 2012. The new version would include a DVD with music video's and live video footage.

On September 27, 2012, Beni's official website announced the release on a second cover album named "Covers 2". After this new album, Beni announced her first artist book named Cover Girl. Covers 2 debuted on the Oricon weekly chart at #5 selling over 50,000 copies, making it Beni's best debut sales ever.

In March 2013, Beni's official website announced a new single named "Satsuki Ame" to be released on April 24, 2013. This marks the first time that BENI written and composed the title track. On June 26, 2013, Beni release a new single named "Our Sky". Shortly after that, a new album named Red was announced. The album was released on July 31, 2013. The following year, she released a Best of collection.

In November 2015 Beni released the album Undress. In 2019, she made an appearance as a guest artist at the Japanese touring ice show Fantasy on Ice, where she performed to her non-album single "Mienai Start" in the finale amongst others.

== Discography ==
- Beni (2005)
- Girl 2 Lady (2006)
- Gem (2007)
- Bitter & Sweet (2009)
- Lovebox (2010)
- Jewel (2010)
- Fortune (2011)
- Covers (2012)
- Covers 2 (2012)
- Red (2013)
- Covers 3 (2013)
- Undress (2015)
- Shiki Uta: Summer (2016)
- Covers the City (2017)
- Cinematic (2018)
- Made In Love (2020)
- Dreamin' (2026)
