= Mō Nido to... =

"もう二度と・・・"

Single by BENI

from the album Bitter & Sweet
- Released: December 10, 2008
- Genre: J-Pop, R&B
- Label: Universal Japan
- Composers: Dohzi-T, Shingo. S
- Lyricists: Beni, Dohzi-T

BENI singles chronology
"Mō Ichi do..." (2008)	"もう二度と・・・" (2008)	"Kiss Kiss Kiss" (2009)

"Mō Nido To..." was the first single that Beni Arashiro released under her new name BENI and label Universal Japan.

The song "Mō Nido To" is an answer song to the long charting hit "Mō Ichi do...", which sold over 80,000 copies. "Mō Nido To..." debuted at the chaku-uta charts at number #1. It August it was reported to have over 800,000 downloads from Chaka-Uta. It charted weekly on the Oricon charts on number 20. To date, the single has sold 12,400 copies.

In May 2009, the clip of "Mō Nido To" is watched over a million times on YouTube.

== Track listing ==
1. "Mō Nido To (もう二度と・・・; Never Again...)"
2. "STAY"
3. "Mō Nido To"(instrumental)
4. "STAY" (Instrumental)

== Charts ==
Mon	Tue	Wed	Thu	Fri	Sat	Sun	Week Rank	Sales
16	17	16	19	26	20	19	20	6,744
31	47	38	40	44	40	50	41	2,621
-	-	37	47	-	-	49	58	3,035

Total Reported Sales: 12,400
