= Kara DioGuardi discography =

The following is the songwriting and production discography of Kara DioGuardi.

== Songs written ==
Discography
Year	Artist	Album	Song
1999	Martine McCutcheon	You Me & Us	03. "I've Got You"
1999	Martine McCutcheon	You Me & Us	06. "Rainy Days"
1999	18th Street / Moondust feat. Kara Dio	N/A - Single Release Only	"La Fiesta (Relive Your Kiss)"
2000	Ricky Martin	Sound Loaded	09. "One Night Man"
2000	Kylie Minogue	Light Years	01. "Spinning Around"
2000	Billie Piper	Walk of Life	05. "Bring It On"
2001	Kinnda	Kinnda	05. "All My Love"
2001	Kinnda	Kinnda	06. "Put These Rumours to Bed"
2001	Kinnda	Kinnda	11. "Some People"
2001	Jessica Simpson	Irresistible	02. "A Little Bit"
2001	Eden's Crush	Popstars	10. "Two Way"
2001	Bardot	Bardot	10. "Girls Do, Boy's Don't"
2001	Kylie Minogue	Fever	"Good Like That"
2001	Enrique Iglesias	Escape	01. "Escape"
2001	Enrique Iglesias	Escape	02. "Don't Turn Off The Lights"
2001	Enrique Iglesias	Escape	05. "I Will Survive"
2001	Enrique Iglesias	Escape	06. "Love 4 Fun"
2001	Enrique Iglesias	Escape	07. "Maybe"
2001	Joy Enriquez	Joy Enriquez	11. "Uh Oh"
2002	Celine Dion	A New Day Has Come	02. "Right in Front of You"
2002	Celine Dion	A New Day Has Come	11. "Sorry for Love"
2002	Kelly Osbourne	Shut Up	01. "Disconnected"
2002	Kelly Osbourne	Shut Up	03. "Contradiction"
2002	Kelly Osbourne	Shut Up	04. "Coolhead"
2002	Kelly Osbourne	Shut Up	05. "Right Here"
2002	Kelly Osbourne	Shut Up	06. "On the Run"
2002	Kelly Osbourne	Shut Up	07. "On Your Own"
2002	Kelly Osbourne	Shut Up	08. "Too Much of You"
2002	Kelly Osbourne	Shut Up	09. "Everything's Alright"
2002	Kelly Osbourne	Shut Up	10. "More Than Life Itself"
2002	Laura Pausini	From the Inside	01. "I Need Love"
2002	Laura Pausini	From the Inside	10. "I Do To Be"
2002	Marc Anthony	Mended	01. "Love Won't Get Any Better"
2002	Marc Anthony	Mended	03. "She Mends Me"
2002	Marc Anthony	Mended	04. "I've Got You"
2002	Marc Anthony	Mended	06. "I Reach for You"
2002	Marc Anthony	Mended	07. "I Swear"
2002	Marc Anthony	Mended	08. "Don't Tell Me It's Love"
2002	Marc Anthony	Mended	10. "Give Me A Reason"
2002	Marc Anthony	Mended	11. "I Wanna Be Free"
2002	Soluna	For All Time	02. "Hey Hey You You"
2002	Soluna	For All Time	11. "He Should Be You"
2002	Rouge	Rouge	02. "Não Dá Pra Resistir"
2003	Play	Replay	07. "What Is Love?"
2003	Thalía	Thalía	02. "Baby, I'm in Love"
2003	Thalía	Thalía	09. "Tu Y Yo"
2003	Thalía	Thalía	11. "Alguien Real"
2003	Hilary Duff	Metamorphosis	02. "Come Clean"
2003	Hilary Duff	Metamorphosis	04. "Little Voice"
2003	Celine Dion	One Heart	05. "One Heart"
2003	Celine Dion	One Heart	08. "Sorry for Love"
2003	Rachel Stevens	"Negotiate with Love" (single)	03. "Queen"
2003	Clay Aiken	Measure of a Man	03. "The Way"
2003	Britney Spears	In the Zone	11. "Brave New Girl"
2003	Nikki Cleary	Nikki Cleary	03. "1-2-3"
2003	Nikki Cleary	Nikki Cleary	09. "Irresistible"
2003	Enrique Iglesias	7	11. "Roamer"
2003	Delta Goodrem	Innocent Eyes	03. "Not Me, Not I"
2003	Delta Goodrem	Innocent Eyes	06. "Predictable"
2004	Anastacia	Anastacia	01. "Seasons Change"
2004	Anastacia	Anastacia	06. "I Do"
2004	Anastacia	Anastacia	07. "Welcome to My Truth"
2004	Anastacia	Anastacia	08. "Pretty Little Dum Dum"
2004	Anastacia	Anastacia	09. "Rearview"
2004	Anastacia	Anastacia	10. "Where Do I Belong"
2004	Anastacia	"Left Outside Alone" (single)	02. "Get Ready"
2004	Natasha Bedingfield	Unwritten	13. "Peace of Me"
2004	Ryan Cabrera	Take It All Away	09. She's
2004	Cherie	Cherie	01. "I'm Ready"
2004	Cherie	Cherie	05. "I Believe In You"
2004	Kelly Clarkson	Breakaway	05. "Gone"
2004	Kelly Clarkson	Breakaway	07."Where Is Your Heart"
2004	Kelly Clarkson	Breakaway	08. "Walk Away"
2004	Kelly Clarkson	Breakaway	09. "You Found Me"
2004	Kelly Clarkson	Breakaway	10. "I Hate Myself For Losing You"
2004	Kelly Clarkson	Breakaway	11. "Hear Me"
2004	Darius Danesh	Live Twice	01. "Kinda Love"
2004	Darius Danesh	Live Twice	04. "Better Man"
2004	Lara Fabian	A Wonderful Life	12. "Walk Away"
2004	Lisa Stansfield	The Moment	02. "Treat Me Like a Woman"
2004	Raven-Symoné	This Is My Time	02. "Backflip"
2004	Raven-Symoné	This Is My Time	03. "What is Love?"
2004	Hilary Duff	A Cinderella Story: Original Soundtrack	05. "Now You Know" (Originally sung by DioGuardi in the film.)
2004	Hilary Duff	Hilary Duff	01. "Fly"
2004	Hilary Duff	Hilary Duff	02. "Do You Want Me?"
2004	Hilary Duff	Hilary Duff	06. "Underneath This Smile"
2004	Hilary Duff	Hilary Duff	09. "Shine"
2004	Hilary Duff	Hilary Duff	15. "Someone's Watching Over Me"
2004	Becky Baeling	Ultra.Dance 04	02. "Take It Away"
2004	Ashlee Simpson	Autobiography	01. "Autobiography"
2004	Ashlee Simpson	Autobiography	02. "Pieces of Me"
2004	Ashlee Simpson	Autobiography	03. "Shadow"
2004	Ashlee Simpson	Autobiography	04. "La La"
2004	Ashlee Simpson	Autobiography	06. "Better Off"
2004	Ashlee Simpson	Autobiography	08. "Surrender"
2004	Ashlee Simpson	Autobiography	10. "Nothing New"
2004	Ashlee Simpson	"La La" (single)	02. "Endless Summer"
2004	Diana DeGarmo	Blue Skies	02. "Blue Skies"
2004	Diana DeGarmo	Blue Skies	04. "Then I Woke Up"
2004	Diana DeGarmo	Blue Skies	07. "The Difference in Me"
2004	Diana DeGarmo	Blue Skies	08. "Till You Want Me"
2004	Diana DeGarmo	Blue Skies	10. "Boy Like You"
2004	Diana DeGarmo	Blue Skies	11. "Dream, Dream, Dream"
2004	Gwen Stefani	Love. Angel. Music. Baby.	02. "Rich Girl" (featuring Eve)
2004	Lindsay Lohan	Speak	01. "First"
2004	Lindsay Lohan	Speak	02. "Nobody 'Til You"
2004	Lindsay Lohan	Speak	04. "Speak"
2004	Lindsay Lohan	Speak	05. "Over"
2004	Lindsay Lohan	Speak	07. "Anything but Me"
2004	Lindsay Lohan	Speak	11. "Magnet"
2004	Peter Andre	The Long Road Back	01. "What Is Love?"
2005	Natalie Imbruglia	Counting Down the Days	01. "Starting Today"
2005	Natalie Imbruglia	Counting Down the Days	09. "On the Run"
2005	Hilary Duff	Most Wanted	15. "Supergirl"
2005	Ryan Cabrera	You Stand Watching	05. "Photo"
2005	Ricky Martin	Life	02. "I Won't Desert You"
2005	Ashlee Simpson	I Am Me	01. "Boyfriend"
2005	Ashlee Simpson	I Am Me	02. "In Another Life"
2005	Ashlee Simpson	I Am Me	03. "Beautifully Broken"
2005	Ashlee Simpson	I Am Me	04. "L.O.V.E."
2005	Ashlee Simpson	I Am Me	05. "Coming Back for More"
2005	Ashlee Simpson	I Am Me	06. "Dancing Alone"
2005	Ashlee Simpson	I Am Me	07. "Burnin' Up"
2005	Ashlee Simpson	I Am Me	08. "Catch Me When I Fall"
2005	Ashlee Simpson	I Am Me	09. "I Am Me"
2005	Ashlee Simpson	I Am Me	10. "Eyes Wide Open"
2005	Ashlee Simpson	I Am Me	11. "Say Goodbye"
2005	Ricki-Lee Coulter	Ricki-Lee	02. "Sunshine"
2005	Pussycat Dolls	PCD	02. "Beep" (featuring will.i.am)
2005	Pussycat Dolls	PCD	06. "I Don't Need a Man"
2005	Pussycat Dolls	PCD	00. "Flirt"
2005	Bo Bice	The Real Thing	01. "The Real Thing"
2005	Bo Bice	The Real Thing	06. "Remember Me"
2005	Bo Bice	The Real Thing	09. "It's My Life"
2005	Santana	All That I Am	03. "I'm Feeling You" (featuring Michelle Branch and The Wreckers)
2005	Santana	All That I Am	10. "Cry Baby Cry" (featuring Joss Stone and Sean Paul)
2005	Kate DeAraugo	A Place I've Never Been	06. " If This Is Love"
2005	The Veronicas	The Secret Life of...	11. "Nobody Wins"
2005	The Veronicas	The Secret Life of...	14. "Did Ya Think" (U.S. special edition bonus track)
2005	Lindsay Lohan	A Little More Personal (Raw)	01. "Confessions of a Broken Heart (Daughter to Father)"
2005	Lindsay Lohan	A Little More Personal (Raw)	02. "Black Hole"
2005	Lindsay Lohan	A Little More Personal (Raw)	05. "My Innocence"
2005	Lindsay Lohan	A Little More Personal (Raw)	06. "A Little More Personal""
2005	Lindsay Lohan	A Little More Personal (Raw)	07. "If It's Alright"
2005	Lindsay Lohan	A Little More Personal (Raw)	08. "If You Were Me"
2005	Lindsay Lohan	A Little More Personal (Raw)	09. "Fastlane"
2005	Lindsay Lohan	A Little More Personal (Raw)	11. "Who Loves You"
2005	Lindsay Lohan	A Little More Personal (Raw)	12. "A Beautiful Life (La Bella Vita)"
2006	Pink	I'm Not Dead	15. "Heartbreaker" (bonus track)
2006	Jewel	Goodbye Alice in Wonderland	04. "Good Day"
2006	Cheyenne Kimball	The Day Has Come	02. "I Want To"
2006	Cheyenne Kimball	The Day Has Come	07. "Hello Goodbye"
2006	Jesse McCartney	Right Where You Want Me	05. "Anybody"
2006	Jesse McCartney	Right Where You Want Me	11. "Invincible"
2006	Paris Hilton	Paris	04. "I Want You"
2006	Paris Hilton	Paris	05. "Jealousy"
2006	Paris Hilton	Paris	08. "Screwed"
2006	Paris Hilton	Paris	09. "Not Leaving without You"
2006	Bethany Joy Lenz as Haley James Scott	One Tree Hill Volume II: Friends With Benefit	13. "Halo"
2006	Christina Aguilera	Back to Basics	01. "Intro (Back to Basics)"
2006	Christina Aguilera	Back to Basics	02. "Makes Me Wanna Pray"
2006	Christina Aguilera	Back to Basics	03. "Back in the Day"
2006	Christina Aguilera	Back to Basics	04. "Ain't No Other Man"
2006	Christina Aguilera	Back to Basics	05. "Understand"
2006	Christina Aguilera	Back to Basics	06. "Slow Down Baby"
2006	Christina Aguilera	Back to Basics	07. "Oh Mother"
2006	Christina Aguilera	Back to Basics	08. "F.U.S.S."
2006	Christina Aguilera	Back to Basics	09. "On Our Way"
2006	Christina Aguilera	Back to Basics	10. "Without You"
2006	Christina Aguilera	Back to Basics	11. "Still Dirrty"
2006	Christina Aguilera	Back to Basics	13. "Thank You (Dedication to Fans...)"
2006	Belinda	Utopía	04. "Bella Traición"
2006	Belinda	Utopía	06. "Alguien Más"
2006	Belinda	Utopía	09. "Noche Cool"
2006	Delta Goodrem	Innocent Eyes	11. "Predictable"
2006	Eva Avila	Somewhere Else	02. "Not So Different"
2006	Platinum Weird	Make Believe	01. "Will You Be Around"
2006	Platinum Weird	Make Believe	02. "Lonely Eyes"
2006	Platinum Weird	Make Believe	03. "Happiness"
2006	Platinum Weird	Make Believe	04. "Make Believe"
2006	Platinum Weird	Make Believe	05. "Picture Perfect"
2006	Platinum Weird	Make Believe	06. "If You Believe in Love"
2006	Platinum Weird	Make Believe	07. "Love Can Kill the Blues"
2006	Platinum Weird	Make Believe	08. "I Pray"
2006	Platinum Weird	Make Believe	09. "Piccadilly Lane"
2006	Platinum Weird	Make Believe	10. "Goodbye My Love"
2006	RBD	Celestial	01. "Tal Vez Después"
2006	RBD	Celestial	07. "Tu Dulce Voz"
2006	RBD	Nuestro Amor	02. "Me Voy"
2006	Bianca Ryan	Bianca Ryan	04. "Pray for a Better Day"
2006	Joana Zimmer	The Voice In Me	04. "If It's Too Late"
2006	Vanessa Hudgens	V	16. "Make You Mine" (Deluxe edition bonus track, released in 2008.)
2006	Nick Lachey	What's Left of Me	10. "Ghosts"
2006	Nick Lachey	What's Left of Me	13. "Alone"
2006	Taylor Hicks	Taylor Hicks	03. "Heaven Knows"
2006	Taylor Hicks	Taylor Hicks	06. "Give Me Tonight"
2007	Katharine McPhee	Katharine McPhee	01. "Love Story"
2007	Katharine McPhee	Katharine McPhee	03. "Open Toes"
2007	Katharine McPhee	Katharine McPhee	04. "Home"
2007	Katharine McPhee	Katharine McPhee	05. "Not Ur Girl"
2007	Katharine McPhee	Katharine McPhee	06. "Each Other"
2007	Katharine McPhee	Katharine McPhee	08. "Ordinary World"
2007	Katharine McPhee	Katharine McPhee	11. "Neglected"
2007	Ashley Tisdale	Headstrong	04. "Be Good to Me"
2007	Ashley Tisdale	Headstrong	00. "Hurry Up" (Unreleased)
2007	Hilary Duff	Dignity	01. "Stranger"
2007	Hilary Duff	Dignity	02. "Dignity"
2007	Hilary Duff	Dignity	03. "With Love"
2007	Hilary Duff	Dignity	04. "Danger"
2007	Hilary Duff	Dignity	06. "Never Stop"
2007	Hilary Duff	Dignity	07. "No Work, All Play"
2007	Hilary Duff	Dignity	08. "Between You and Me"
2007	Hilary Duff	Dignity	09. "Dreamer"
2007	Hilary Duff	Dignity	10. "Happy"
2007	Hilary Duff	Dignity	11. "Burned"
2007	Hilary Duff	Dignity	13. "I Wish"
2007	Hilary Duff	Dignity	14. "Play with Fire"
2007	Suzie McNeil	Broken & Beautiful	01. "Lonely (Are You Coming Home?)
2007	Suzie McNeil	Broken & Beautiful	02. "Believe"
2007	Suzie McNeil	Broken & Beautiful	10. "The One"
2007	Avril Lavigne	The Best Damn Thing	03. "Runaway"
2007	Kelly Clarkson	My December	02. "One Minute"
2007	Miley Cyrus as Hannah Montana	Hannah Montana 2: Meet Miley Cyrus	01. "We Got the Party"
2007	Puffy AmiYumi	Honeycreeper	09. "Closet Full Of Love"
2007	Faith Hill	The Hits	04. "Lost"
2007	Backstreet Boys	Unbreakable	04. "Something That I Already Know"
2007	Britney Spears	Blackout	10. "Ooh Ooh Baby"
2007	Celine Dion	Taking Chances	01. "Taking Chances"
2007	Celine Dion	Taking Chances	06. "Surprise Surprise"
2007	Leona Lewis	Spirit	15. "Forgiveness"
2007	The Cheetah Girls	TCG	03. "Human"
2007	Mýa	"My Bra" (single)	01. "My Bra"
2007	Daddy Yankee	El Cartel: The Big Boss	14. "Papi Love" (feat Nicole Scherzinger)
2007	Nicole Scherzinger	"Baby Love" (single)	01. "Baby Love" (feat will.i.am)
2007	Enrique Iglesias	Insomniac	04. "Somebody's Me"
2007	Enrique Iglesias	Insomniac	10. "Stay Here Tonight"
2007	Enrique Iglesias	Insomniac	14. "Alguien Soy You"
2008	Hannah Montana & Miley Cyrus	Hannah Montana & Miley Cyrus: Best of Both Worlds Concert	07. "We Got the Party" (with Jonas Brothers)
2008	Daniel Powter	Under the Radar	01. "Best of Me" (DioGuardi also composed the song with Powter)
2008	Camp Rock	Camp Rock (soundtrack)	01. "We Rock"
2008	Camp Rock	Camp Rock (soundtrack)	02. "Play My Music" (performed by Jonas Brothers)
2008	The Cheetah Girls	The Cheetah Girls: One World	01. "Cheetah Love"
2008	The Cheetah Girls	The Cheetah Girls: One World	07. "I'm The One"
2008	Vanessa Hudgens	Identified	12. "Gone with the Wind"
2008	Denise Rosenthal	El Blog de la Feña	10. "Bye Bye
2008	Denise Rosenthal	El Blog de la Feña	11. "Déjate Llevar"
2008	Diego Boneta	Indigo	12. "Losing Me"
2008	Demi Lovato	Don't Forget	09. "The Middle"
2008	Demi Lovato	Don't Forget	11. "Believe in Me"
2008	Pussycat Dolls	Doll Domination	07. "Who's Gonna Love You"
2008	Pussycat Dolls	Doll Domination	14. "Love The Way You Love Me
2008	Pussycat Dolls	Doll Domination	17. "Baby Love" J.R. Rotem Remix (International bonus track)
2008	Lesley Roy	Unbeautiful	06. "When I Look at You"
2008	P!nk	Funhouse	02. "Sober"
2008	Theory of a Deadman	Scars & Souvenirs	04. "Not Meant to Be"
2008	David Archuleta	David Archuleta	09. "To Be With You"
2008	Anna Vissi	Apagorevmeno	01. "Apagorevmeno (song)"
2008	Agnes Carlsson	Dance Love Pop	07. "Don't Pull Your Love Out"
2009	Kelly Clarkson	All I Ever Wanted	02. "I Do Not Hook Up"
2009	Miley Cyrus	Hannah Montana: The Movie (soundtrack)	07. "Dream"
2009	Miley Cyrus	The Time of Our Lives (EP)	01. "Kicking and Screaming" (Originally sung by Ashlee Simpson, bonus track from I Am Me.)
2009	Miley Cyrus as Hannah Montana	Hannah Montana 3	03. "Mixed Up"
2009	Miley Cyrus as Hannah Montana	Hannah Montana 3	04. "He Could Be the One"
2009	Miley Cyrus as Hannah Montana	Hannah Montana 3	07. "Supergirl"
2009	Miley Cyrus as Hannah Montana	Hannah Montana 3	10. "Don't Wanna Be Torn"
2009	Tynisha Keli	The Chronicles of Tk	05. "Lullabye"
2009	Tynisha Keli	The Chronicles of Tk	06. "Walls Up"
2009	Tynisha Keli	The Chronicles of Tk	08. "Shatter'd"
2009	Tynisha Keli	The Chronicles of Tk	10. "Lights Out"
2009	Rascal Flatts	Unstoppable	10. "Once"
2009	Kris Allen/Adam Lambert	"No Boundaries" (single)	01. "No Boundaries"
2009	Ashley Tisdale	Guilty Pleasure	08. "What If"
2009	Crosby Loggins	Time to Move	02. "Seriously"
2009	Jessie James	Jessie James	01. "Wanted"
2009	The Friday Night Boys	Off the Deep End	05. "Stuttering"
2009	Cobra Starship	Hot Mess	03. "Good Girls Go Bad" (featuring Leighton Meester)
2009	Cobra Starship	Hot Mess	06. "Hot Mess"
2009	Colbie Caillat	Breakthrough	02. "Begin Again"
2009	Colbie Caillat	Breakthrough	07. "I Never Told You"
2009	Colbie Caillat	Breakthrough	08. "Fearless"
2009	Colbie Caillat	Breakthrough	13. "What I Wanted to Say" (Deluxe edition bonus track)
2009	Carrie Underwood	Play On	03. "Mama's Song"
2009	Carrie Underwood	Play On	05. "Undo It"
2009	Adam Lambert	For Your Entertainment	04. "Strut"
2009	Allison Iraheta	Just Like You	11. "No One Else"
2009	Every Avenue	Picture Perfect	09. "I Forgive You"
2009	William Chan 陳偉霆	War-ri-or	02. "今天終於知道錯" (Originally sung by Daniel Powter, track from Under the Radar.)
2009	Halestorm	Halestorm	06. "I'm Not An Angel"
2009	Ballas Hough Band	BHB	08. "Do It for You"
2009	Pixie Lott	Turn It Up	15. "Without You" (Digital deluxe edition bonus track)
2009	Tom Jones	24 Hours	Give a Little Love
2010	Toni Braxton	Pulse	08. "Hero"
2010	The Band Perry	The Band Perry	07. "Postcard from Paris"
2010	Jo Dee Messina	Unmistakable Trilogy: Love	05. Treat Me Like a Woman Today
2010	Mêlée	The Masquerade	02. "Girls Wanna Rock"
2010	Katharine McPhee	Unbroken	02. "Had It All"
2010	Katharine McPhee	Unbroken	06. "Terrified" (with Jason Reeves)
2010	Danny Gokey	My Best Days	03. "I Still Believe"
2010	Camp Rock 2: The Final Jam	Camp Rock 2: The Final Jam (soundtrack)	01."Brand New Day" (performed by Demi Lovato)
2010	Mickie James	Strangers & Angels	05. "Strangers & Angels"
2010	Fefe Dobson	Joy	02. "Ghost"
2010	VersaEmerge	Fixed at Zero	03. "Let Down" (Deluxe edition bonus track)
2010	Darius Rucker	Charleston, SC 1966	01. "This"
2011	Sara Evans	Stronger	09. "Wildfire"
2011	Colbie Caillat	All of You	07. "Think Good Thoughts"
2011	Jason Derulo	Future History	09. "Bleed Out"
2011	Cobra Starship	Night Shades	08. "Fucked in Love"
2011	China Anne McClain	A.N.T. Farm Soundtrack	06. "My Crush"
2011	Charice	Infinity	08. "Lessons For Life"
2011	Tila Tequila	Non-album single	01. "You Can Dance"
2012	Colbie Caillat	Christmas In the Sand	03. "Christmas In the Sand"
2012	Colbie Caillat	Christmas In the Sand	07. "Everyday is Christmas"
2012	Rascal Flatts	Changed	10. "Great Big Love"
2012	Outasight	Nights Like These	01. "Now or Never"
2013	Scott Stapp	Proof of Life	08. "Jesus was a Rockstar"
2013	Chris Daughtry	Baptized	11. "Traitor"
2014	Theory of a Deadman	Savages	02. "Blow"
2014	RaeLynn	TBD	"Careless"
2015	Kelly Clarkson	Piece by Piece	01. "Heartbeat Song"
2015	Hilary Duff	Breathe In. Breathe Out.	14. "Rebel Hearts"
2015	Bea Miller	Not an Apology	09. "Dracula"
2015	Melanie Martinez	Cry Baby	06. "Pity Party"
2016	Matoma	Hakuna Matoma	01. "False Alarm" (with Becky Hill)
2016	Colbie Caillat	The Malibu Sessions	03. "Goldmine"
2016	Colbie Caillat	The Malibu Sessions	10. "In Love Again"
2016	Robbie Williams	The Heavy Entertainment Show	08. "David's Song"
2016	Olly Murs	24 HRS	04. "Unpredictable" (solo / with Louisa Johnson)
2018	Chelcee Grimes	TBA	00. "I Need a Night Out"

=== TBA ===
- Ali Lohan - Ali Lohan's forthcoming studio album
  - 00. "All the Way Around"
  - 00. "Close That Door"
- Nicole Scherzinger - Her Name Is Nicole shelved project
  - 10. "Who's Gonna Love You"

== As producer/co-producer ==
- Britney Spears ("Heaven on Earth", "Ooh Ooh Baby")
- Celine Dion ("Surprise Surprise", "One Heart")
- Cobra Starship ("Good Girls Go Bad" (featuring Leighton Meester)
- Kelly Clarkson ("Walk Away")
- Santana ("Feeling You")
- Lindsay Lohan ("Over", "First", "Confessions of a Broken Heart (Daughter to Father)")
- Hannah Montana (Miley Cyrus's role) ("We Got the Party")
- Katharine McPhee ("Love Story", "Home")
- Raven-Symoné ("Backflip", "What Is Love")
- Jessica Simpson ("A Little Bit" (Chris "The Greek" and Guido Club Mix))
- Kylie Minogue ("Good Like That")
- Backstreet Boys ("Something That I Already Know")
- Hilary Duff ("Little Voice")
- Genta Ismajli ("Planet Me")

== As performer ==
Featured artist

- Kelly Clarkson ("The Sun Will Rise") (Deluxe edition bonus track')
  - Stronger (2011)
