= Lindsay Lohan discography =

Cataloguing of published recordings by Lindsay Lohan

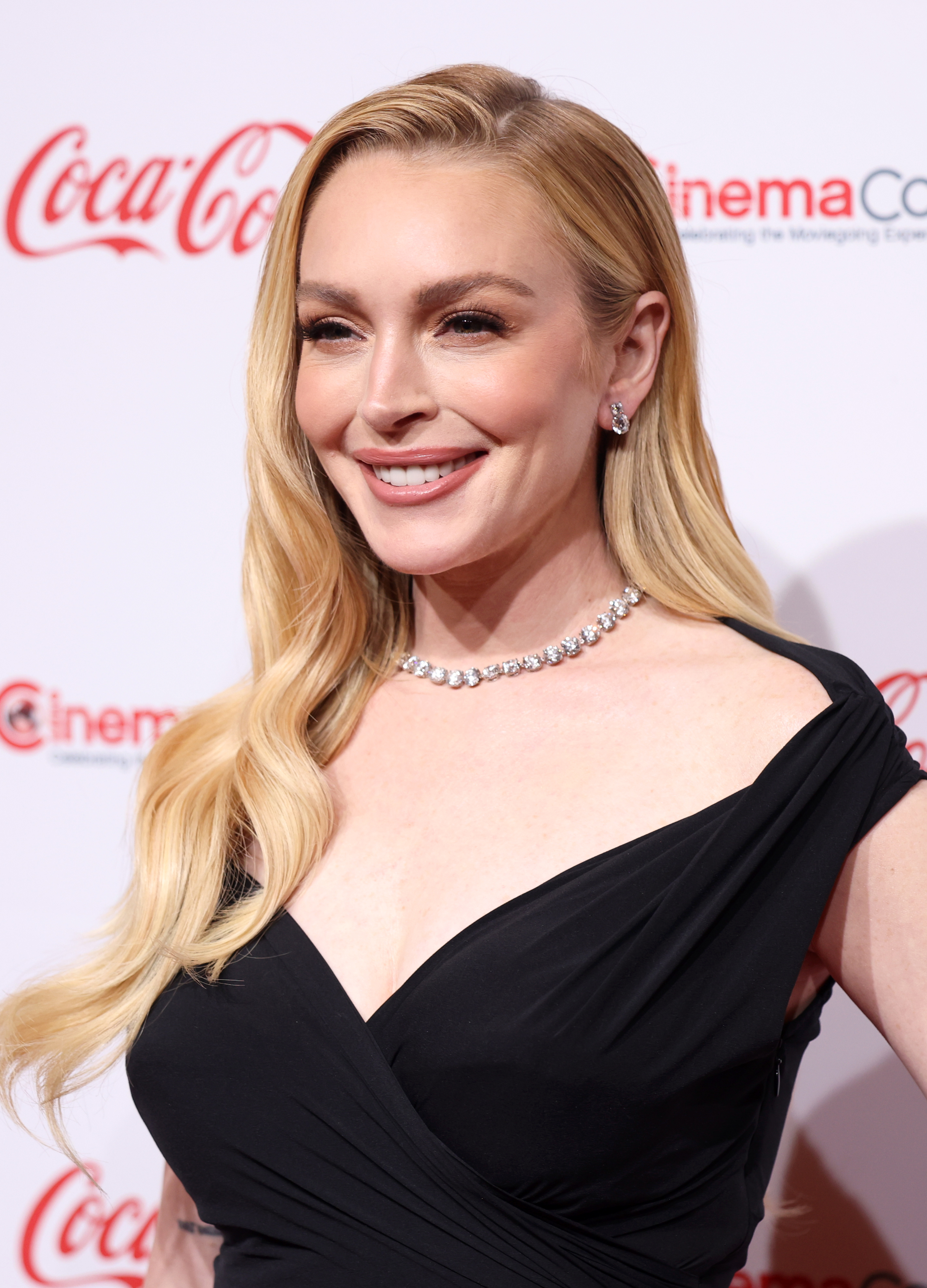
- Lohan in 2025
- Studio albums: 2
- Singles: 6

American actress and singer Lindsay Lohan has released two studio albums and six singles. While acting in the Disney films Freaky Friday (2003) and Confessions of a Teenage Drama Queen (2004), Lohan began recording songs for the soundtracks. In September 2002, Emilio Estefan, Jr. signed Lohan to a five-album contract. The deal was later scrapped and Lohan signed on to Casablanca Records in 2004, under the management of Tommy Mottola. Speak, her debut album, was released in December 2004. The record peaked at number 4 on the Billboard 200 and earned a Platinum certification. Speak spawned Lohan's first single, "Rumors", which eventually earned a Gold certification, as well as a nomination for Best Pop Video at the 2005 MTV Video Music Awards. The album went on to sell two million copies worldwide by May 2005.

Lohan's second album, A Little More Personal (Raw), was released in December 2005. The album peaked at number 20 on the Billboard 200, gaining Gold certification in early 2006. The first and only single from the album, "Confessions of a Broken Heart (Daughter to Father)", peaked at number 57 on the Billboard Hot 100, making it Lohan's first song to debut on the chart. In 2007, Lohan commenced work on a third album following a move to the Universal Motown label. A single, "Bossy", released in May 2008, was written by Ne-Yo and Stargate. The album was initially due for release in late 2008, however, Lohan announced in November 2008 that work on the album had stalled. In 2010, it was believed that she was still recording an album after the long wait. In July 2019, it was confirmed that Lohan was working on new music with Universal Republic's Casablanca Records again, and teased the track "Xanax" on social media. The single "Back to Me" was then released on April 3, 2020. In 2022, she revealed she was focused on her acting career and new music would likely only come in soundtrack form, adding, "I've done a ton of songs that are sitting, waiting. Maybe five years down the line, I'll do another album."

== Studio albums ==
List of studio albums, with selected chart positions, sales figures and certifications
Title	Details	Peak chart positions								Certifications	Sales
Title	Details	US	AUS	AUT	CAN	GER	JPN	POL	UK	Certifications	Sales
Speak	Released: December 7, 2004; Label: Casablanca, Universal; Formats: CD, digital download, LP, cassette, streaming	4	57	36	9	53	19	12	105	RIAA: Platinum; RIAJ: Platinum	US: 1,100,000
A Little More Personal (Raw)	Released: December 6, 2005; Label: Casablanca, Universal; Formats: CD, digital download, LP, cassette, streaming	20	88	—	43	—	44	—	—	RIAA: Gold	US: 305,000
"—" denotes releases that did not chart or were not released in that territory.

== Singles ==
List of singles, with selected chart positions and certifications
Title	Year	Peak chart positions										Certifications	Album
Title	Year	US	AUS	AUT	CAN	GER	IRL	NL	SWE	SWI	UK	Certifications	Album
"Rumors"	2004	— (Note: "Rumors" did not enter the Billboard Hot 100, but peaked at number 6 on the Bubbling Under Hot 100 chart.)	10	23	—	14	—	31	34	30	—	RIAA: Gold; ARIA: Gold	Speak
"Over"	2004	— (Note: "Over" did not enter the Billboard Hot 100, but peaked at number 1 on the Bubbling Under Hot 100 chart.)	27	49	—	40	19	—	—	52	27		Speak
"First"	2005	—	31	—	—	74	—	—	—	41	—		Speak
"Confessions of a Broken Heart (Daughter to Father)"	2005	57	7	74	—	—	—	—	—	—	—		A Little More Personal (Raw)
"Bossy"	2008	— (Note: "Bossy" did not enter the Billboard Hot 100, but peaked at number 1 on the Dance Club Songs chart.)	—	—	77	—	—	—	—	—	—		Non-album singles
"Back to Me"	2020	—	—	—	—	—	—	—	—	—	—		Non-album singles
"—" denotes releases that did not chart or were not released in that territory.

=== Promotional singles ===
List of promotional singles, showing year released and album name
Title	Year	Album
"Ultimate"	2003	Freaky Friday (soundtrack)
"Drama Queen (That Girl)"	2004	Confessions of a Teenage Drama Queen (soundtrack)
"Jingle Bell Rock" (featuring Ali Tomineek)	2022	Falling for Christmas (soundtrack)

== Guest appearances ==
List of guest appearances, with other performing artists, showing year released and album name
Title	Year	Other artists	Album
"What Are You Waiting For"	2004	—N/a	Confessions of a Teenage Drama Queen (soundtrack)
"Don't Move On / Living for the City / Changes"	2004	—N/a	Confessions of a Teenage Drama Queen (soundtrack)
"A Day in the Life"	2004	—N/a	Confessions of a Teenage Drama Queen (soundtrack)
"I Decide"	2004	—N/a	The Princess Diaries 2: Royal Engagement (soundtrack)
"Skits"	2005	Olivia, DJ Whoo Kid, Tony Yayo	So Seductive (G-Unit Radio Part 12)
"Frankie and Johnny"	2006	—N/a	A Prairie Home Companion (soundtrack)
"Red River Valley / In the Sweet By and By"	2006	A Prairie Home Companion cast	A Prairie Home Companion (soundtrack)
"Lohan Holiday"	2006	Ali Lohan	Lohan Holiday
"A Beautiful Life"	2007	—N/a	The Hills: The Soundtrack
"Danceophobia"	2015	Duran Duran	Paper Gods
"Baby (Acoustic)"	2025	—N/a	Freakier Friday (soundtrack)
"Baby"	2025	Julia Butters	Freakier Friday (soundtrack)
"Baby (Beach)"	2025	—N/a	Freakier Friday (soundtrack)
