= Back to Me (Lindsay Lohan song) =

Single by Lindsay Lohan
- Released: April 3, 2020
- Recorded: 2019
- Genre: Electropop; pop; dance
- Length: 2:53
- Label: Casablanca
- Songwriters: Alma Miettinen; Chiara Hunter; Mark Ralph
- Producer: Mark Ralph

Lindsay Lohan singles chronology
"Bossy" (2008)	"Back to Me" (2020)

Audio video
- "Back to Me" on YouTube

"Back to Me" is a song recorded by American singer Lindsay Lohan for her upcoming third studio album. It was written by Alma Miettinen, Chiara Hunter and its producer Mark Ralph. The song, which was Lohan's first single in twelve years, was released to digital platforms on April 3, 2020, by Casablanca Records. It received mostly positive reviews from the critics.

== Background and release ==
In June 2019, it was announced that Lohan signed a new recording contract with Casablanca Records. She was previously signed to the label, which released her albums Speak and A Little More Personal (Raw) in 2004 and 2005, respectively. It was also revealed that Lohan was working on new music with "a small team of producers and songwriters", having already completed a few songs for an upcoming project. On August 29, Lohan premiered a snippet of "Xanax", her first new song since "Bossy" (2008), on Kris Fade's Virgin Radio Dubai show. While it has yet to be officially released, Lohan posted the song on her Instagram account, alongside what Vulture described as a "homemade music video" that was later deleted. After teasing the release of new music for several more months, Lohan announced in January 2020 that she would be releasing her long-awaited third studio album at the end of February.

On March 31, Lohan released a "cryptic video" that officially announced her musical comeback. The video, which she posted on all of her social media accounts, "opens on a dark room filled with several television sets, all of which display images from throughout Lohan's career, including paparazzi shots and scenes from her "Rumors" music video — all while a distorted song softly plays in the background". The next day, she revealed that she would be releasing "Back to Me", her first new single in twelve years, on April 3. Lohan also shared a short snippet of the song and explained that it is about "rediscovering and accepting oneself, shutting out the noise and moving forward and letting the past go. Living in the now."

Alma said she wrote the track for herself originally, but felt that its "empowering message" might better suit another vocalist, and that Lohan reached out to work with her after hearing it "through a mutual friend." She considered Lohan's contributions "amazing" and that "it feels great to be a part of," and declared she was a big fan of hers, saying: "I've followed her career since I was a teenager. Who wouldn't love Lindsay Lohan?" Lohan confessed she was so scared about how her return would be received she turned her phone off on the day the teaser video was released and her label couldn't reach her. She also disclosed she was frustrated and had been wanting to put her new music out for a while and that the coronavirus pandemic did not allow her to shoot a planned music video, but they decided to go ahead with the song's release as the lyrics would resonate with people's present situation.

== Composition and lyrics ==
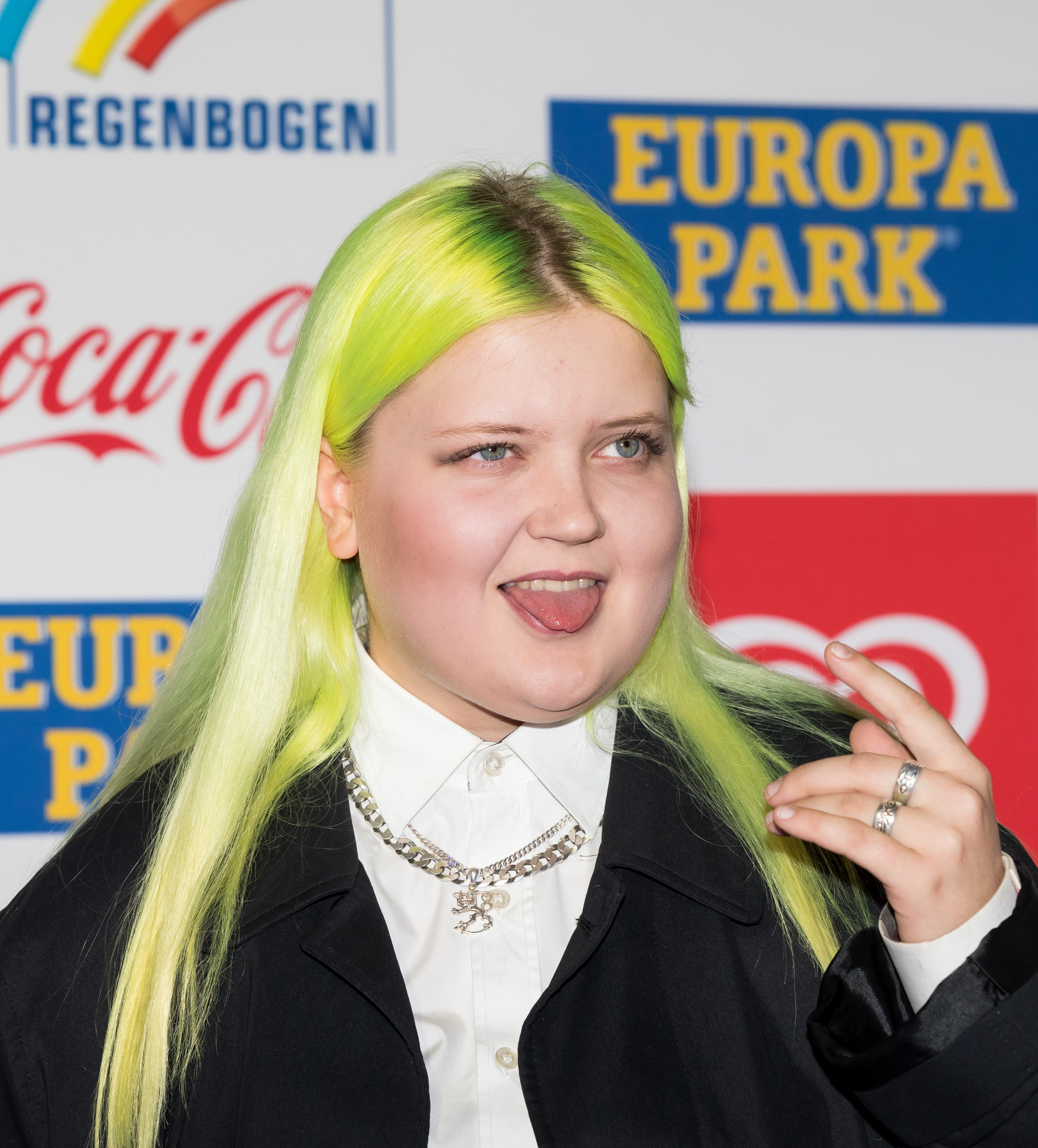
Alma initially wrote "Back to Me" for herself but felt its message best suited Lohan.

"Back to Me" is an electropop, "pulsating" pop, song in the key of A minor with a length of two minutes and fifty-three seconds. Described as having a "floating, synth-based melody" with "plinking beats circling her rallying cry of 'I'm coming back to me!'," some considered it inspired by "her life at her own branded resorts in Mykonos, Greece." Lyrically, the track explores themes of "renewal and resilience," that "spill into a clubby hook", as well as "leaving the past behind for a shot at self-discovery, and part of that journey means not running away when the going gets tough." Marissa Matozzo of Paper said the lyrics find Lohan "reclaiming her identity in the face of great challenges" and the "breezy pop song represents a recovering tabloid queen who appears to have finally found her center." Bradley Stern of MuuMuse considered it lyrically "picks up right where the same girl behind cuts" such as "Rumors", "Confessions of a Broken Heart (Daughter to Father)", "My Innocence" and "Fastlane" left off.

Lohan expressed that the song's lyrics described her feelings towards life. She noted that the inspiration behind "Back to Me" was "going through life" and having "naysayers and people that are judging us, being very critical and we take a lot of that on," continuing that, "as you grow up and learn more in life, you find more of an inner strength and you don't listen all of the negatives so you don't have to go backwards and keep harping on what people think of you, or mistakes [...] made in your life in the past." Lohan asserted that the song's message is "really about just moving forward in a positive direction and not giving in to all the judgment that we put on ourselves, that people place on us" and not allowing the negativity "to come in front of you [...] and being happy and healthy."

During an interview on Beats 1, Lohan elaborated that "Xanax" and "Back to Me" work as two different sides of her project, with the former being about her life when she was younger living in Los Angeles, and the latter is more personal and about finding herself, "my inner self, soul-searching essentially, and not worrying about the outside noises and voices," she reiterated, confessing she felt "really raw and really honest, and it was scary for me to put that out [...] to throw myself back into the lion's den essentially is nerve-wracking for me." She felt more comfortable with "Back to Me" and doesn't want "history to repeat itself" in her life. Lohan asserted her biggest fear was how people would react to the first verse of the song, as she had debated changing the "I know I drink too much" line to "I know I think too much" in a demo version, explaining "because that's not me now", but after talking with her brother who lives in Los Angeles she felt it would get more people's attention to keep the former.

== Critical reception ==
Upon release, "Back to Me" received positive reviews from music critics, most of whom complimented Lohan's return to music. Billboard called the song a "chill track with an upbeat club vibe" and highlighted its lyrics for Lohan confronting her difficult years growing up in the public eye, and how she's become stronger from the experience. The same publication ranked it as one of Lohan's most essential songs to date, with Bianca Gracie labeling it a "party-ready jam" and saying "the combination of self-aware lyricism and thumping dance production is worthy of an addition to the “Crying In The Club Anthems” Hall of Fame," while Jason Lipshutz also reviewed the track and wondered "if the actress/tabloid fixture has too much cultural baggage to successfully relaunch her music career," continuing, "But then the song's main hook hits, and all preconceived concerns melt away. "Back To Me" contains a stellar refrain that posits Lohan as a dance floor siren." Lipshutz concluded, "Lohan's best-case scenario was returning with a song with this sort of bulletproof hook, and by the end of "Back To Me," you'll be hitting the replay button and rooting for her." Paris Close at iHeart stated that "Lohan delivered a hot new club anthem [...] which sounds as therapeutic as it is triumphant." MTV's Madeline Roth compared the energy of the track to Lohan's single "Rumors," declaring her "musical career once again looks bright."

Entertainment Weekly called the song "a breezy, infectiously catchy electro-pop gem" and also noted that the song sees her singing about "reconnecting with herself in the wake of past trauma." Caitlin Gallagher of Bustle similarly remarked that the lyrics show that Lohan is "not worried about what people think about her" as "she's ready to move on from her past and accept who she has become. And not only is the track a reflection on self-acceptance, it's also a banger." Billy Nilles claimed on The MixtapE! that Lohan "delivers an absolute serve," elaborating, "With lyrics that embrace the rocky road she's walked down the last few years while celebrating a return to form and her signature smoky vocals largely intact, the chill electro-pop track is an absolute vibe." While writing about the song for Vanity Fair, Dan Adler considered that Lohan's return and "its portal back into her winding career—or into the mid-2000s more generally—is one of the more enveloping possibilities" for those looking for distraction amid the ongoing coronavirus pandemic crisis. Carolyn Droke from Uproxx described the "empowering anthem" a "buoyant return to music" that proves Lohan has a "certain knack for pop music", with its hook and "vibrant percussion" making the track "destined for dance floors everywhere."

== Track listing ==
Digital download

1. "Back to Me" – 2:53

Digital download (Dave Audé Remix)

1. "Back to Me" (Dave Audé Remix) – 3:45

Digital download (Black Caviar Remix)

1. "Back to Me" (Black Caviar Remix) – 3:24

7" vinyl

1. "Rumors" – 3:16
2. "Back To Me" – 2:53

== Release history ==
Release history for "Back to Me"
Country	Date	Version	Format	Label	Ref.
Various	April 3, 2020	Original version	Digital download; streaming	Casablanca	
Various	May 8, 2020	Dave Audé remix	Digital download; streaming	Casablanca	
Various	July 10, 2020	Black Caviar remix	Digital download; streaming	Casablanca	
United States	November 15, 2024	Original version	LP	Republic Records	
