= I Wish You Loved Me =

Single by Tynisha Keli

from the album The Chronicles of TK
- Released: September 4, 2007
- Recorded: 2007
- Genre: R&B, Pop
- Length: 4:52
- Label: Warner Bros.
- Songwriters: Rico Love, Dwayne Nesmith, Jean-Pierre Medor
- Producer: Tha Cornaboyz

Tynisha Keli singles chronology
"I Wish You Loved Me" (2007)	"Shatter'd" (2009)

I Wish You Loved Me is a song by American singer Tynisha Keli from her debut album The Chronicles of TK. The single was written by Rico Love and produced by Tha Cornaboyz. The world premiere of the single was released on September 4, 2007. It first appeared on Billboard's Bubbling Under Hot 100 Singles chart on the week of August 9, 2008 and peaked at #13. The official remix features Sammie.

== Music video ==
The video was shot in and outside a building. The scenario was mostly beauty shots, sitting with friends, and shots of the love interest. On Tynisha's official Kyte Channel she had said the video was supposed to be a viral video and not the actual video.

== Charts ==
Chart (2008)	Peak position
U.S. Billboard Bubbling Under R&B/Hip-Hop Singles	13

Chart (2009)	Peak position
Billboard Japan Hot 100	25
