= Paradise (Mya song) =

- Limited vinyl cover

Single by Mya

from the album Sugar & Spice
- A-side: "Shy Guy"
- Released: October 31, 2008
- Studio: The Shack (Negril, Jamaica)
- Genre: Riddim
- Length: 3:25
- Label: Planet 9; Manhattan
- Songwriters: Mya Harrison; Christopher T. Moore
- Producer: Chris "Riddim Fingaz" Garvey

Mýa singles chronology
"My Bra" (2007)	"Paradise" (2008)	"Fabulous Life" (2011)

"Paradise" is a song recorded by American singer Mya. A riddim-inspired tune, "Paradise" was written by Mya and songwriter Christopher T. Moore with production helmed by Chris "Riddim Fingaz" Garvey. Released October 31, 2008 on her label imprint Planet 9 with distribution via Manhattan Recordings, "Paradise" served as the lead and only single taken from the singer's fifth studio album Sugar & Spice.

Upon release, "Paradise" received underwhelming mixed reception from contemporary music critics whom perceived the single was beneath the singer's talent. Critics aside, the single performed and charted moderately well in the Asian music market territory. Preceding the single's release, an accompanying music video was shot, filmed and directed by photographer Marc Baptiste followed.

== Background ==
In search of new producers to contribute to her fifth studio album Sugar & Spice, while at a Guitar Center in Los Angeles buying equipment Mya met reggae producer Chris "Riddim Fingaz" Garvey's brother and got his phone number. Aware of his existence in reggae music and production skills, the singer reluctantly called him, collaborated, and produced "Paradise," a Riddim-inspired song. Of his contribution to Sugar & Spice Harrison commented, "Riddim Fingaz has a great presence and is a great talent. Played during a listening session, fans responded positively, and thus "Paradise" was chosen as the single.

== Composition ==
"Paradise," is a Riddim-inspired song with a common runtime of three minutes and twenty-five seconds. Written by Mya and songwriter Christopher T. Moore, "Paradise" was recorded at The Shack studio in Negril, Jamaica. On top of writing the song's lyrics, the duo handled the song's vocal production as well. In addition to her songwriting and production duties, the singer was responsible for engineering "Paradise" too. Mixing and mastering duties was provided by Mike Mo at M.A.D studios in Atlanta, Georgia and Houston, Texas.

== Release and promotion ==
Issued as the lead single, Manhattan Recordings released "Paradise" October 31, 2008 on all digital platforms. In December, a remix version – adding an island edge – of "Paradise" featuring reggae artist Sean Paul was released. Another remix was issued as well, this version was produced by American record producer Ryan Leslie and appears on Sugar & Spice:The Perfect Edition.

To promote Sugar & Spice and "Paradise," Manhattan Recordings organized and arranged an album release party at Fever, a popular night club/music venue where Mya performed for the very first time in Japan. A 40 minute stage show; it featured four costumes changes, the singer was accompanied by four dancers and performed new material from Sugar & Spice as well as her past hits from discography.

== Music video ==
Manhattan Recordings commissioned an accompanying music video for "Paradise." Directed by photographer Marc Baptiste, the music video was shot and filmed partly behind a black and white screen in New York City; during the video the singer is seen dancing closely with a male model and wearing a bikini in a transparent bathtub.

== Chart performance ==
"Paradise" charted moderately in Asian territories. During the week of November 23, 2008, "Paradise" debuted on J-Wave's Tokio Hot 100 at number 66 as a new entry. Two weeks later, the week of December 7, 2008, it peaked at number thirty-five.

== Track listing ==
Digital download/streaming

1. "Paradise" – 3:25

== Credits and personnel ==
Credits adapted from the liner notes of Sugar & Spice.

Recording

- Recorded at The Shack (Negril, Jamaica)
- Mixed and Mastered at M.A.D Studios (Atlanta, Georgia) and (Houston, Texas)

Personnel

- Mya – songwriting, vocal production
- Christopher T. Moore – songwriting, vocal production
- Chris "Riddim Fingaz" Garvey – production
- Mike Mo – mixing, mastering

== Release history ==
Region	Date	Format	Label	Ref.
Japan	October 31, 2008	Digital download	Planet 9; Manhattan Recordings	
