= The 5th Element (Tynisha Keli album) =

Studio album by Tynisha Keli
- Released: August 17, 2010
- Recorded: 2009–2010
- Genre: R&B, pop, hip-hop
- Length: 44:50
- Label: Eight72 Entertainment, Warner Japan
- Producer: Tynisha Keli (also executive), Tha Cornaboyz, Jean-Pierre "The Maven" Medor, Dominic Gordon, A-Rex

Tynisha Keli chronology
The Chronicles of TK (2009)	The 5th Element (2010)	The Underdogs (2024)

Singles from The 5th Element
- 1. "Next Time" Released: June 23, 2010; 2. "The Right Way" Released: July 27, 2010; 3. "Love Hurts" Released: August 4, 2010

The 5th Element is the second studio album by American pop/R&B singer-songwriter Tynisha Keli, which was released digitally on August 17, 2010, in Japan. The album's production was a collaborative effort between Tynisha Keli and Tha Cornaboyz.

== Background ==
In early 2010, Tynisha Keli announced that she would be departing from her longtime record label Warner Brother Records after she asked to be released, but would be recording a sophomore project. Tynisha signed with Eight72 Entertainment, an Atlanta-based independent label run by her longtime managers Tyrrell Bing and Lamar Chase.

After much success in Japan with her previous album, The Chronicles of TK, where she sold over 600,000 copies, Tynisha set out to record a new album to be released in the US, Japan and Europe.

On Tynisha's first album she worked with many big name songwriters, and producers but for her second album wanted to stick to the talented people inside Tha Cornaboyz camp. She selected Pierre Medor to vocal arrange the entire project. She also enlisted the help of songwriter Atozzio Townes, who has written for artists like Chris Brown, Keke Palmer and Ray J. She also worked with the new up-and-coming songwriting/music production team called Write Time Music Group based in Atlanta; they were responsible for writing 4 songs on the album, two out of the four songs written by WTMG were also produced by Dominic Gordon, who is a music producer in the group (Next Time, Half a Man, Heart Break and Calling My Name).

On May 24, 2024, a remastered edition of The 5th Element was digitally released worldwide through Humble Sound Records.

== Release and promotion ==
The album was completed in March 2010, and on March 16, 2010, Tynisha hosted an album-listening party at Atlanta's BMI offices.

== Singles ==
The first single for the album, "Next Time", produced by Reefa, DR and 12Keyz (C2) and written by Write Time Music Group dropped on June 23, 2010.

On June 16, 2010. during a live interview with Large FM, Tynisha herself, along with her manager Tyrrell Bing of Tha CornaBoyz, premiered her new single, Tha CornaBoyz penned and produced ballad "The Right Way", although the single was not available for purchase until July 17.

Tynisha's second Japanese single, "Love Hurts" (featuring Coma-Chi), was released on August 4, 2010 and became an instant hit when it debuted at number one on the International Master Ringtone Download Chart and Mobile Single Download Chart. A video for the single was shot in Yokohama, Japan by director Masaki Ohkita.

The 5th Element was released digitally in Japan on August 17, 2010. The Japanese physical edition and the international digital release was released on August 25. The Japanese edition of the album features collaborations by Japanese artist Coma Chi "Love Hurts", and Jay'ed "The Right Way". The US edition does not include these versions of those songs. The international digital edition entitles "Love Hurts" under its original title "Worst Enemy".

On August 25, 2010, Tynisha Keli along with rapper Jay Beretta, and her manager, Tyrrell Bing, appeared on LargeFM's online radio show to launch the album. During the show she conducted an in studio interview that was broadcast via webcam on the net. They also played four tracks from the album, which included "Heart Break", "How to Love", "Right Here Waiting", and "Live Without You".

On September 20, 2010, Tynisha performed at the Shibuya Woman Festival in Japan in support of The 5th Element. The set included "Love Hurts", "The Right Way", and "I Wish You Loved Me". On September 21, 2010 Tynisha made her very first television appearance in Japan with a performance of "Love Hurts" on the T.V show Waratte Iitomo "It's Okay to Laugh".

Tynisha Keli has gone on interviews since and revealed her label Eight72 removed the album off all digital services and stopped all pressings after she left the label, which she stated she left due to distrusting her team after they lost her trust and support. After she was notified in 2023 on her Instagram replies that the album was readily available on the digital streaming service Anghami, she filed a lawsuit stating breach of upload permission and invalidating set contracted release allowance. She alleged that the family members of her then label-owner may have broken the agreed upon details and uploaded the album online for extra revenue, because he had since been deceased after the initial contract was filed.

== Track listing ==
North American digital release
No.	Title	Writer(s)	Producer(s)	Length
1.	"Next Time"	Dominic Gordon, Shantee Tyler, Brandon Hesson, Sharif Slater, Denzil Remedios, Kibwe Luke	Reefa, iDR, 12keyz	3:26
2.	"Worst Enemy (Love Hurts)"	Tynisha Keli Soares, Tyrrell Bing, Dwayne Nesmith, Reina Tajima	Tha Cornaboyz	3:34
3.	"The Right Way"	Jean-Pierre Medor, Tyrrell Bing, Dwayne Nesmith	Tha Cornaboyz	3:41
4.	"Half a Man" (featuring Jay Beretta)	Tyrrell Bing, Darhyl Camper, Dominic Gordon, Brandon Hesson, Shantee Tyler, Jerald Johns Jr.	Darhyl "DJ" Camper	3:19
5.	"Live Without You"	Shelby Morris, Dwayne Nesmith	Tha Cornaboyz	3:33
6.	"Heart Break"	Dominic Gordon, Shantee Taylor, D. Nick	Dominic Gordon	3:12
7.	"How to Love"	Jean-Pierre Medor, Thurston Hargrove, Bianca Atterberry	Jean-Pierre Medor	3:47
8.	"Calling My Name"	Soares, Dominic Gordon, Shantee Tyler, Brandon Hesson	Dominic Gordon	2:47
9.	"Miss My Love"	Jean-Pierre Medor, Soares, Kameron Jones, Shantee Tyler, Shaunte Talbert	Jean-Pierre Medor	3:16
10.	"Dear Love"	Tyrrell Bing, Kenyate "Kashus" Robinson, Nehemiah D. Nesmith, Dwayne Nesmith	Tha Cornaboyz	4:02
11.	"Right Here Waiting"	Nastasia Griffin	Sean Hamilton, Hyuk Shin (A-Rex)	4:03
12.	"Next Time" (Remix)	Dominic Gordon, Shantee Tyler, Brandon Hesson, Sharif Slater, Denzil Remedios, Kibwe Luke	Reefa, iDR, 12keyz	3:14

Japanese edition
No.	Title	Writer(s)	Producer(s)	Length
2.	"Love Hurts" (featuring Coma-Chi)	Tynisha Keli Soares, Tyrrell Bing, Dwayne Nesmith, Reina Tajima	Tha Cornaboyz	3:34
3.	"The Right Way" (featuring Jay'ed)	Jean-Pierre Medor, Tyrrell Bing, Dwayne Nesmith	Tha Cornaboyz	3:41
13.	"Worst Enemy (Love Hurts)"	Tynisha Keli Soares, Tyrrell Bing, Dwayne Nesmith, Reina Tajima	Tha Cornaboyz	3:35

Notes

- On May 24, 2024, a remastered edition of The 5th Element was digitally released worldwide through Humble Sound Records. The remaster follows the North American digital track list, only varying in "The Right Way" featuring Jay'ed appearing in place of the solo version, and the removal of the remix for "Next Time".

== Chart performance ==
Chart (2010)	Provider	Peak position
Japanese Albums Chart	Oricon	36
