= Fabulous Life =

Single by Mya

from the album K.I.S.S. (Keep It Sexy & Simple)
- Released: January 19, 2011
- Studio: Chalice Recording Studios (Los Angeles)
- Genre: Electropop; J-pop; freestyle
- Length: 3:58
- Label: Planet 9; Manhattan
- Songwriters: Mya Harrison; Edwin Serrano; Andreas Levander
- Producers: Jeff Miyahara; Fredo

Mýa singles chronology
"Paradise" (2008)	"Fabulous Life" (2011)	"Love Is the Answer" (2011)

"Fabulous Life" is a song recorded by American singer Mya. An uptempo J-pop inspired tune, "Fabulous Life" was written by Andreas Levander, Edwin Serrano, and Mya with production helmed by Jeff Miyahara and Fredo. Released January 19, 2011 on her label imprint Planet 9 with distribution via Manhattan Recordings, "Fabulous Life" served as the lead single taken from the singer's sixth studio album K.I.S.S. (Keep It Sexy & Simple).

Upon release, "Fabulous Life" received generally favourable reception from contemporary music critics whom praised the song's '80s pop inspired production. Commercially, "Fabulous Life" performed moderately well in the Asian music market territory. Following the song's release, "Fabulous Life" was featured on the Bravo network to promote its Fashion By Bravo campaign.

== Background and composition ==
For her sixth studio album K.I.S.S. (Keep It Sexy & Simple), the singer decided to experiment with a new sound and incorporated J-pop inspired songs. In an interview conducted by AOL Music, the singer briefly discussed why she opted to experiment with the genre and commented, "This is a new fun sound for me [...] and I'm ready to have some FUN!." Described as "synthy," "happy," and "fun," "Fabulous Life" is an 80's freestyle, electropop jam written by Andreas Levander, Edwin Serrano, and Mya with a common runtime of three minutes and fifty-eight seconds. Produced by Jeff Miyahara and Fredo, "Fabulous Life" was recorded at Chalice Recording Studios in Los Angeles. In addition to production duties, Jeff Miyahara engineered the track as well. Mixing was provided by Satashi Hasai at Somewhere Studios in Tokyo, Japan.

== Release and promotion ==
Issued as the lead single, "Fabulous Life" was pre-released December 29, 2010 on RecoChoku, a digital music phone app based in Japan. Three weeks later, Manhattan Recordings released "Fabulous Life" January 19, 2011 on all digital platforms.

== Critical reception ==
Critically, "Fabulous Life" was well received. Writing for MTV, Chris Ryan dubbed "Fabulous Life" one of MTV's Buzzworthy tracks and praised the song as "an addictive piece of dance pop stuffed with melodies."

== Usage in media ==
Following the single's release, NBC Universal licensed "Fabulous Life" to promote its Fashion By Bravo campaign.

== Track listing ==
Digital download/streaming

1. "Fabulous Life" – 3:58

== Credits and personnel ==
Credits adapted from the liner notes of K.I.S.S. (Keep It Sexy & Simple).

Recording

- Recorded at Chalice Recording Studios (Los Angeles)
- Mixed at Somewhere Studios (Tokyo, Japan)

Personnel

- Andreas Levander – songwriting
- Edwin Serrano – songwriting
- Mya Harrison – songwriting
- Jeff Miyahara – production, engineering
- Fredo – production
- Satashi Hasai – mixing

== Release history ==
Region	Date	Format	Label	Ref.
Japan	January 19, 2011	Digital download	Planet 9; Manhattan Recordings	
