= Bossy (Lindsay Lohan song) =

Single by Lindsay Lohan
- Released: May 27, 2008
- Recorded: c. 2008
- Genre: Electropop; dance-pop
- Length: 4:10
- Label: Universal Motown
- Songwriters: Ne-Yo; Stargate
- Producers: Ne-Yo; Stargate

Lindsay Lohan singles chronology
"Confessions of a Broken Heart (Daughter to Father)" (2005)	"Bossy" (2008)	"Back to Me" (2020)

Audio video
- "Bossy" on YouTube

"Bossy" is a song by American singer Lindsay Lohan. The song was written and produced by Shaffer Smith, known by his stage name Ne-Yo, while additional writing and production was done by Stargate members Mikkel Storleer Eriksen and Tor Erik Hermansen. After leaking online in the beginning of May 2008, Universal Motown officially released the song to media outlets, while its digital single was released in the United States and Canada on May 27, 2008. Musically, "Bossy" is an electropop and dance-pop song. Lyrically, it is about a woman being strong enough to get what she wants when she wants it.

Critically, "Bossy" attained generally mixed reception upon release, many music critics generally praised the attitude of the song, but considered the song less catchy than Lohan's previous efforts. Commercially, "Bossy" peaked at number 77 on the Canadian Hot 100 and became Lohan's first song to reach number one on the United States' Billboard Hot Dance Club Play.

In 2019, the song was used as the title theme for Lohan's MTV reality television series, Lindsay Lohan's Beach Club.

== Background ==
"Bossy"
A 22 second sample of the song's chorus, which features Lohan singing over an electropop background with simple drums.

"Bossy" was written by Shaffer Smith, known by his stage name Ne-Yo, while additional writing and song production was done by Stargate members Mikkel Storleer Eriksen and Tor Erik Hermansen. In the beginning of May 2008, a clip of the song leaked on YouTube. As a result, Universal Motown released the full song to media outlets on May 7, 2008. In an interview with Billboard, Ne-Yo revealed that he was approached by the label to write a song for Lohan: "I gotta admit, we were like ... Lindsay Lohan?' I mean, I've written for Beyoncé, Mary J. Blige, Rihanna, Celine Dion and ... Lindsay Lohan? But I will say this; we gave her a quality record and she did a ridiculously fabulous job. I was so shocked I had to call her and apologize for what I was thinking because she did so good. I think the world is gonna be surprised." In an interview with People Magazine, he revealed the song "it's basically about a woman being strong enough to get what she wants when she wants it. In this case, 'Bossy' is a term that describes confidence and power." "Bossy" was digitally released in the United States and Canada on May 27, 2008, and it was reportedly set to appear on Lohan's third studio album.

== Critical reception ==
Upon its release, "Bossy" received mixed reviews from music critics; however, the song has received significant praise in the years following its release, with critics noting the song was released well before its time.

Initially following its release, A Billboard review said "the track spotlights the raspy-voiced singer's dominating side as she rhymes about liking things her way over simple drums", while Nick Levine of Digital Spy considered "Bossy" as an "electro-dance-pop [song] with attitude", but commented that it "isn't pop gold – the chorus lacks a bit of oomph and Lohan's vocals still aren't convincing – but it's the first Lohan tune we'd be prepared to listen to more than once. That, we suppose, is enough to constitute a small step forward". Kate Brandli of Blogcritics said "Bossy" "is not nearly as good or as catchy as Miss Lohan's previous musical attempts", while commenting that its lyrical content "is an obvious reflection on Miss Lohan's relationship with the paparazzi. As Miss Lohan sings in the lyrics, she does what she wants, she controls them, and not vice versa. Unfortunately, Miss Lohan's logic is not entirely correct—neither party has the authority to boss the other around. That is, sadly, the price of fame these days—once people want in, they want total access and exposure. With some individual's antics, like Miss Lohan and Britney Spears, it is difficult to garner sympathy for them". "Bossy" reached number 77 on the Canadian Hot 100, and became Lohan's first song from her entire career to reach number one on the United States' Billboard Hot Dance Club Play. The song also managed to peak on the Global Dance Tracks component chart.

In 2017, 9 years after the song's release, Alexis Hodoyan-Gastelum of Idolator stated that the song was released during a time when "people were expecting Lohan to continue on the alt-pop rock route", noting that the electro-pop sound of the song only became prominent following the sleeper success of the Lady Gaga single "Just Dance", which was also released in 2008, but only achieved significant success in 2009. In 2019, the song again received media coverage following its usage as the opening song on Lohan's MTV reality television series Lindsay Lohan's Beach Club. Patrick Crowley of Billboard stated that "Beach Club will chronicle Lohan’s daily life as the boss of her own beach club in Mykonos, Greece -- and fittingly, her 2008 track “Bossy” soundtracks the intro clip", while Kristie Rohwedder of 'Bustle' questioned whether "'Bossy' is going to have a moment in 2019?" and whether the show was going to "propel 'Bossy' to No. 1 over a decade after it was released?". The song's new-found interest prompted several questions on Lohan releasing new music, to which Lohan stated that "My sister [Aliana] is coming out with her record and I want to support her in that," "We've talked about writing together and maybe doing something together if we have season two, or just in general."

== Track listing ==
- Digital download
1. "Bossy" – 4:10

== Charts ==
=== Weekly charts ===
Chart (2008)	Peak position
Canada Hot 100 (Billboard)	77
Global Dance Songs (Billboard)	23
US Dance Club Songs (Billboard)	1

=== Year-end charts ===
Chart (2008)	Position
US Dance Club Songs (Billboard)	16
