= My Bra =

Promotional single by Mya

from the album Matters of Life and Dating
- Released: October 15, 2007
- Recorded: 2007
- Genre: Pop; R&B
- Length: 4:04
- Label: Universal Motown
- Songwriters: Kara DioGuardi; James Poyser
- Producer: James Poyser

Mya singles chronology
| "Ridin'" (2007) | "My Bra" (2007) | "Paradise" (2008) |

"My Bra" is a song recorded by American singer Mya. It written by songwriters Kara DioGuardi and James Poyser with production helmed by the latter and commissioned as Lifetime's Stop the Breast Cancer Life campaign first ever theme song to raise breast cancer awareness and promote Lifetime's original movie "Matters of Life and Dating".

== Background and writing ==
Mta reportedly became involved with Lifetime's annual Stop the Breast Cancer Life campaign and the Breast Cancer Awareness community after her mother was diagnosed with breast cancer in 1998. The network recruited her to record a special theme song for their 13th annual Stop the Breast Cancer Life campaign. Other celebrities involved in the campaign included Whoopi Goldberg, Reba McEntire, Fran Drescher and Daisy Fuentes. The song, "My Bra," is based around the idea that we can be supportive, uplifting presences — er, "bras" — in each other's lives. Songwriter Kara DioGuardi, whose mother died of ovarian cancer in 1997 wrote "My Bra" with composer James Poyser. Commenting on the results, Kara said, "It was an experience very close to me. I literally wrote the song in five minutes."

== Release and promotion ==
A bittersweet midtempo song with urban sensibility. Lifetime kicked off promotion and released "My Bra", Monday, October 15, 2007 as an offered download for .99 cents on iTunes along with a sneak peek of Lifetime's Original Movie "Matters of Life and Dating". iTunes cross-promoted the song and movie throughout October -- National Breast Cancer Awareness Month. In turned, Mta's Universal Motown label simultaneously promoted the song and movie as well. All proceeds from the sale of "My Bra" went towards breast cancer research.

== Critical reception ==
"My Bra" received lukewarm reception from music critics and the media. Writing for Idolator, Noah applauded Mýa for wanting "to sing a song in honor of people, like her mom, who have survived breast cancer." All in all, dissatisfied, he dismissed the song as "gloppy" and ultimately called the song, "like a really, really bad idea."

== Release history ==
Release history and formats
| Region | Date | Format | Label | Ref. |
|---|---|---|---|---|
| Various | October 15, 2007 | Digital download | Universal Motown | |
