= Shatter'd =

Single by Tynisha Keli

from the album The Chronicles of TK
- Released: March 4, 2009
- Recorded: 2008
- Genre: Pop; R&B
- Length: 4:29
- Label: Warner Bros.
- Songwriters: Sean Alexander; C.Coe; Drew Ryan Scott; Johan Alkenäs; Niclas Molinder; Joacim Persson

Tynisha Keli singles chronology
| "I Wish You Loved Me" (2007) | "Shatter'd" (2009) | "Woman" (2009) |

Shatter'd is a song recorded by American singer Tynisha Keli, released as the second single from Keli's debut studio album The Chronicles of TK (2009). The song was written by Joacim Persson, Niclas Molinder, Johan Alkenas, Drew Ryan Scott, C. Coe and Sean Alexander. After the world premiere of the single on March 4, 2009, "Shatter'd" debuted on Japan's Hot 100 Singles at #16. The song's chorus repeats the phrase "you broke it you bought it".

== Music video ==
The video was shot in Japan by director Mutou Makoto. The video consists of Tynisha singing into a microphone with light and dark lighting shining on her.

== Charts ==
| Chart (2009) | Peak position |
|---|---|
| Billboard Japan Hot 100 | 4 |
