= The Chronicles of TK =

Studio album by Tynisha Keli
- Released: April 21, 2009
- Recorded: 2006–2008
- Genre: R&B, pop, hip hop
- Length: 49:32
- Label: Warner Bros.
- Producer: Tha Cornaboyz, Rico Love, Madd Scientist, J.R. Rotem, Harvey Mason, Jr., Rob Knox, Kara DioGuardi, Twin & Aike

Tynisha Keli chronology
The Chronicles of TK (2009)	The 5th Element (2010)

Singles from The Chronicles of TK
- 1. "I Wish You Loved Me" Released: September 4, 2007; 2. "Shatter'd" Released: March 4, 2009; 3. "Woman" Released: March 25, 2009; 4. "Lights Out" Released: April 1, 2009; 5. "The Boy Is Mine" Released: August 12, 2009

Professional ratings
Review scores
Source	Rating
Amazon JP	5/5 stars
HMV	4/5 stars

The Chronicles of TK is the debut album from Tynisha Keli originally titled, "Even If It Takes Forever". The album debuted at number twelve on the Japanese Albums Chart with sales of over 10,192 copies in the first week. The album was released digitally on April 21, 2009, with a physical release following on April 28. On June 26, the album had a physical release in Europe.

== Background ==
Keli delivers her story with uplifting optimism, setting vignettes from her life, both happy and sad, to an irresistible backdrop of urban-influenced rhythmic groove and touching R&B balladry crafted by leading songwriters and producers Kara DioGuardi and J.R. Rotem, who between them have worked with such artists as Pink, Britney Spears, Rihanna, Gwen Stefani, Kelly Clarkson, Ashlee Simpson, and Ashley Tisdale.

The original recording sessions spawned contributions from Soulshock & Karlin: Carsten Schack and Kenneth Karlin ("Lonely Days"), James Poyser ("There Goes My Baby"), Mario Barrett ("The Greatest Performer"), Shaffer "Ne-Yo" Smith ("Stay or Go") and The Jam: Michael Mani & Jordan Omley ("My Everything"), but none of the tracks made it to the final cut.

== Track listing ==
Japanese digital edition
No.	Title	Writer(s)	Producer(s)	Length
1.	"Conversations with God"	Beau Dozier	Beau Dozier	4:04
2.	"I Wish You Loved Me"	Rico Love, Le'Che Martin, Chad "C-Note" Roper, Dwayne Nesmith, Jean-Pierre Medor	Rico Love, Tha Cornaboyz	4:53
3.	"Rockstar"	Makeba Riddick	Theodre "Madd Scientist" Thomas	3:37
4.	"Woman"	Jasmin Lopez, J.R. Rotem	J.R. Rotem	3:58
5.	"Lullabye"	Kara DioGuardi, Corte Ellis, J.R. Rotem	J.R. Rotem	3:04
6.	"Walls Up"	Kara DioGuardi, James Fauntleroy II, Rob Knox, Kasia Livingston, Harvey Mason, Jr., Steve Russell	Harvey Mason, Jr., Rob Knox	3:47
7.	"Misunderstood"	Tyrell Bing, Tynisha Soares Dwayne Nesmith, Jean-Pierre Medor	Tha Cornaboyz	4:07
8.	"Shatter'd"	Drew Ryan Scott, Sean Alexander	Twin & Aike	4:29
9.	"Spotless Mind"	Tynisha Soares, Tyrell Bing, Dwayne Nesmith, Jean-Pierre Medor	Tha Cornaboyz	4:01
10.	"Lights Out"	Zukhan Bay, Kara DioGuardi, Corte Ellis, Emanuel Kiriakou, J.R. Rotem	J.R. Rotem	3:31
11.	"I'm Gone"	Tyrell Bing, Dwayne Nesmith, Jean-Pierre Medor	Tha Cornaboyz	3:34

Japanese iTunes Store pre-order edition
No.	Title	Writer(s)	Producer(s)	Length
12.	"Do You Ever"	Beau Dozier	Beau Dozier	5:14

Japanese iTunes Store deluxe edition
No.	Title	Writer(s)	Length
12.	"Cry No More"	Tynisha Soares, Jordan Omley, Michael Mani	3:34
13.	"Shatter'd" (music video)

European CD edition
No.	Title	Writer(s)	Producer(s)	Length
12.	"Cry No More"	Tynisha Soares, Jordan Omley, Michael Mani		3:34
13.	"Do You Ever"	Beau Dozier	Beau Dozier	5:14

Japanese CD edition and digital special edition
No.	Title	Writer(s)	Producer(s)	Length
12.	"You & Me Against the World"	Tynisha Soares, Dwayne Nesmith	Tha Cornaboyz	3:21
13.	"It's Over"	Tynisha Soares, Derrick Baker	Bigg D	3:12

Japanese CD+DVD premium edition bonus tracks
No.	Title	Length
14.	"Shatter'd" (Freedombunch Remix Radio Edit)
15.	"Shatter'd" (Freedombunch Remix Extended)	7:50
16.	"I Wish You Loved Me" (DJ Komori Remix)	5:41
17.	"The Boy Is Mine" (featuring Beni)	4:47

Japanese CD+DVD premium edition bonus DVD
No.	Title	Length
1.	"I Wish You Loved Me" (music video)
2.	"Shatter'd" (music video)
3.	"The Boy Is Mine" (featuring Beni) (music video)
4.	"Lullaby" (live video)
5.	"Walls Up" (live video)

=== Original track listing ===
The track listing for the original intended release of the album was confirmed on Tynisha's official MySpace, when the album was originally entitled Even If It Takes Forever. Apart from the final 3 tracks being included on The Chronicles of TK, "All Aboard", "Stay" and "Defeated" were later released on The Underdogs (2024), "Like Everybody Else" and "Let It Go" were released on The Underdogs, Vol. 2 (2024), and "Cry" was released on Dark Horses (2025).

1. "All Aboard"
2. "So Beautiful"
3. "Like Everybody Else"
4. "Stay"
5. "Cry"
6. "Let It Go"
7. "Can We"
8. "Defeated"
9. "I Wish You Loved Me"
10. "Spotless Mind"
11. "Misunderstood"

== Chart performance ==
Chart (2009)	Provider	Peak position
Japanese Albums Chart	Oricon	12
