= First (Lindsay Lohan song) =

Single by Lindsay Lohan

from the album Speak and Herbie: Fully Loaded (Original Soundtrack)
- B-side: "Symptoms of You"
- Released: May 10, 2005
- Recorded: 2004
- Studio: Henson Recording Studios
- Genre: Pop rock
- Length: 3:29
- Label: Casablanca; Hollywood
- Songwriters: Kara DioGuardi; John Shanks
- Producers: John Shanks; Kara DioGuardi

Lindsay Lohan singles chronology
"Over" (2004)	"First" (2005)	"Confessions of a Broken Heart (Daughter to Father)" (2005)

Music video
- "First" on YouTube

"First" is a song recorded by American actress and singer Lindsay Lohan for her debut studio album Speak (2004). It was released as the album's third and final single on May 10, 2005. "First" was also released to help promote the Disney film Herbie: Fully Loaded, in which it appears on the soundtrack. Lohan starred in the film.

The song is about wanting to come first in her boyfriend's life. "First" failed to chart in the United States.

== Background and recording ==
"First" was written and produced by Kara DioGuardi and John Shanks, who would later produce Lohan's second album A Little More Personal (Raw). The song was recorded in 2004 at Henson Recording Studios in Hollywood. She had been recording and filming the movie back-to-back. DioGuardi and Cory Rooney, who wrote and produced Lohan's first single "Rumors", provided background vocals for the song.

"Speak", the title track from the album, was originally going to be released as the third single. Angela Robinson, director of Herbie: Fully Loaded, looked at Lohan's album to see if she could find a track that could be incorporated in the film. She enjoyed listening to "First" and approached Lohan about it being released as the next single. Even though the song is about wanting to be the first person in a boyfriend's life, in the context of the film, however, it is taken as wanting to finish first in a car race.

== Critical reception ==
Stylus Magazine called the song and the second ("Nobody 'Til You") track "promising", while criticizing the other songs on the album.

== Chart performance ==
"First" failed to chart on the US Billboard Hot 100 or the Bubbling Under Hot 100 Singles chart. The single charted at number 31 in Australia, number 41 in Switzerland, and at number 74 in Germany.

== Music video ==
The accompanying music video for "First" began shooting in May 2005, after Lohan had recently bleached her auburn hair blonde. The music video was directed by Jake Nava, who directed her previous singles "Rumors" and "Over". The music video takes place in a garage-like arena in the middle of a race. Lohan and her band sing the song from a stage right next to the track, while clips from Herbie: Fully Loaded play. Lohan also sings and dances beside Herbie, the anthropomorphic Volkswagen Beetle.

== Live performance ==
Lohan performed "First" at KIIS-FM 102.7 Wango Tango event in 2005. She also performed "Speak", the album's title track.

== Track listing and formats ==
CD single

1. "First" – 3:29
2. "Symptoms of You" – 2:55

Maxi single

1. "First" – 3:29
2. "Symptoms of You" – 2:55
3. "Rumors" (The Sharp Boys Club Gossip Vocal Remix) – 7:23
4. "First" (Instrumental) – 3:28

Japanese CD single

1. "First" – 3:29
2. "First" (Instrumental) – 3:28

== Weekly charts ==
Weekly chart performance for "First"
Chart (2005)	Peak position
Australia (ARIA)	31
Germany (GfK)	74
Switzerland (Schweizer Hitparade)	41

== Release history ==
Release dates and formats for "First"
Region	Date	Format	Label	Ref.
United States	May 10, 2005	Contemporary hit radio	Casablanca	
Japan	July 21, 2005	CD	Casablanca	
Germany	July 25, 2005	CD	Casablanca	
Australia	August 8, 2005	CD	Casablanca	
