= Tynisha Keli =

American singer

- Born: Tynisha Keli Soares; July 28, 1985 (age 41); New Bedford, Massachusetts, United States
- Genres: R&B; pop; hip hop; soul
- Occupations: Singer; songwriter; musician; dancer; model; actress
- Years active: 1999–present
- Label: Warner Bros. Records, Warner Japan, Eight72 Entertainment, Sinai Records, Humble Sound Records
- Website: http://artistecard.com/tynishakeli

Tynisha Keli Soares (born July 28, 1985), known by her stage name Tynisha Keli, is an American singer-songwriter, who has seen her greatest success in Japan.

She is best known for the single "I Wish You Loved Me" which was written by Rico Love and produced by Tha Cornaboyz. The singer's debut album, The Chronicles of TK, was released in Japan on April 21, 2009. The album peaked at number twelve on the Japanese Albums Chart, and sold 600,000 copies in Japan. The album's second single, "Shatter'd", reached number four on Billboard's Japan Hot 100. Her second album, The 5th Element was released in August 2010 in Japan. It debuted at number one on Japan's iTunes, the first single released from the album "Love Hurts" also debuted at number one. The album peaked at number thirty-six on the Japanese Albums Chart.

== Early life ==
Tynisha Keli Soares was born in New Bedford, Massachusetts, the daughter of Timothy Soares (died 1986) and Elisa Smith Soares. She is of Portuguese descent. The family were poor during her childhood. She has two brothers--Timothy and Tazmyn Michael Soares (June 23, 1989 - December 21, 2007)--and a sister, Tay'le Rudolph (born 1992). Her father was killed when she was barely a year old. She began immersing herself in music at age 8, including using it to express her frustrations. She began singing professionally at age 14. She moved to Los Angeles, where she lived for seven years before moving to Atlanta. Her brother Tazmyn was killed in Boston in December 2007; he was 18 years old.

== Music career ==
=== 1999–2002: Gyrlz Society and record deal ===
In 1999, Keli met Scott Ross (alias Scottie Gee), a former member of the platinum hip-hop group Marky Mark and the Funky Bunch, who agreed to assist her career. He coached her after school, acting as both manager and father figure. Soon he landed her a gig at the Strand Theatre in Boston, where she performed "Never Can Say Goodbye", the Jackson 5 classic, in front of an all-black audience. She moved to Los Angeles a year later and landed a spot in a pop girl group, Gyrlz Society. Gyrlz Society was an American girl group comprising four members: Amy Correa, Melissa Tessmer, Tynisha Keli, and Katy Scanlan. The group released one single, the group's only song "Respect Me", along with a Double "D" Mix, which was produced by Damon Jones in 2002 under MCA Records. Although the single's casing mentioned a self-titled Gyrlz Society album to be released "later this year" (2003), the album was cancelled and the group quickly disbanded. From the beginning she knew that being part of a group was not her desire; she wanted to try it on her own. Before she got a major record deal, she recorded with Beau Dozier a few demos to send to record labels.

=== 2003–09: Debut album The Chronicles of TK ===
Signed to Warner Bros. Records, Keli worked with Kara DioGuardi, a prominent songwriter/producer. She released the production company and started working with different producers including Bryan-Michael Cox, J.U.S.T.I.C.E. League, Tha Cornaboyz, Robin Thicke, and Rico Love. The album was recorded from 2006 to 2008, and was released in Japan in early 2009. It debuted at number 12 at Japan Oricon Albums Chart and sold over 600,000 copies to date, which was a commercial success for Keli. The first single "I Wish You Loved Me" was released on 2007 and the video was released one year later in 2008. The single debuted in Japan at number 25 in 2009. The second single "Shatter'd", released a few months later, is her first Top 10 song which peaked at number 5 in Japan.

In 2009, she covered the song "The Boy Is Mine" with singer Beni Arashiro. She had a small role in the 2009 film Fame.

She co-wrote the song "Powerless", which was featured on the debut album Exposed by R&B-Singer and Def Jam signed Kristinia DeBarge.

In late 2009, Keli announced on Twitter, that she would leave her record label Warner Bros., without giving a reason. Although Warner Brothers will not be involved in future projects, Tynisha's projects will still be distributed in Japan, by Warner Japan.

=== 2010–2012: The 5th Element and hiatus ===
In January 2010, Keli announced on Ustream that she was working on her second album The 5th Element and all vocal orders would be managed by Pierre Medor. She also stated this album would see only a European release and then she would work on her US debut both released through "Eight72 Entertainment". She has since confirmed on Twitter that the album is completed.

Keli posted in UStream that the first single from her second album will be a song titled "Next Time". The single was released on 16 June 2010 in Europe. The complete album was released on 25 August 2010. It sold 3,000 copies in its first week of release, ranking number thirty-six on Oricon's Weekly Albums Chart. The album was less successful than her previous album The Chronicles of TK.

On June 16, 2010 during a live interview with Large FM, Keli, along with her managers Lamar Chase and Tyrrell Bing of Tha CornaBoyz, premiered her second single, "The Right Way", which was written and produced by Tha CornaBoyz. She re-recorded the song with Japanese singer Jay'ed for the Japanese version of the album.

There were two "first singles" released from this album; "Next Time" in Europe, and "The Right Way" in the United States. A video for the record "Love Hurts" featuring Coma Chi was shot in Yokohama, Japan. It was released in August.

The second single "The Right Way" was released worldwide on 27 July. Her single "Love Hurts" with Japanese rapper Coma-Chi debuted at number one on both the International Master Ringtone Download Chart and Mobile Single Download Chart on her birthday in 2010, becoming her first number one single in Japan. Later, "The Right Way" was released in Japan as well and ranked number one on "Japan's Western RecoChoku Ringtone Charts". It became Keli's second number one single.

Keli signed an endorsement deal with eyewear designer K.Michael and was one of the faces of the 2010 "Forever K. Michael" Designer Eye-ware Campaign, with other artists including Nappy Roots, Cupid, Donnie Klang, and dance crew Fanny Pak. She participated with the campaign in a multi-city tour in late 2010.

The video for Keli's single "The Right Way" was shot in September 2010 in Japan. The music video premiered in January 2011.

In August 2011, Keli recorded a track with singer-songwriter Atozzio called "Reasons", which appeared on his album The Imprint. She is working with songwriter Atozzio on her third, upcoming album and who also worked with her on her second album The 5th Element.

In 2011 Keli ended her relationship with Eight72 Entertainment, ended her collaboration with The Cornaboyz, and fired her manager Tyrrell Bing.

Later, Keli was dropped from Warner Japan, so she decided to take a break from the music business to focus on her personal life. She made no releases in 2012.

=== 2013–2021: Independent career ===
In February 2013 Keli began work on a new album.

In August 2013, Keli revealed what she alleged to be the truth about her ex-manager Tyrrell Bing (CEO of Eight72). According to Keli, her management controlled her entire career, and she felt that she did not have enough voice. Even if she fired her manager in 2010, she is still in contract with "Eight72 Entertainment". She actually has no relationship with her manager. Keli will not be able to sign to another record label or release a third album until she is released from the contract. She refuses to work with her manager again for her upcoming album.

After two years without updates of her music, in April 2015, she released two new songs on YouTube called "What's Best for Me" and "Try Harder". Those songs are a foretaste from her upcoming mixtape, which is still untitled and were set to release in 2015. Later, she announced the first official single of her upcoming project is called "Inhale Exhale", set for 28 May 2015 release - her first release in 5 years.

She formerly worked with Don Destin, who produced her single "Inhale Exhale" and released the musical composition with Destin's label DDP Music Group, Team Mashn Entertainment, which are distributed by INgrooves to release her musical endeavors. Later on, it was announced that Keli was working on an album instead of a mixtape. After the release of "Inhale Exhale", Keli announced the second single "Romeo and Juliet", which was released on September 15, 2015. Keli stated in an interview with the Music Daily Show that her mixtape was scheduled for a January 2016 release. On April 14, 2016 she released a new single called "Forget It All" on iTunes and other music services. During the course her business relationship with DDP Music Group, she met her current manager, Dr. William Harrison, and is currently working on her latest project, The Chronicles of TK Pt. II. On July 5, 2017, Keli released a new song on her Facebook and reverbnation called "Sleeping Alone". In 2018, she released "I Got You Babe", and in 2021 she released "Writing's on the Wall".

=== 2024-present: Return to music ===
In April 2024, it was announced that Keli signed a record deal with Humble Sound Records, owned by musician James Artissen. She later released the mixtapes The Underdogs, The Underdogs, Vol. 2 and Dark Horses, and her third studio album The Chronicles of TK: The Phoenix under the label.

In February 2025, she revealed that she is suffering from cancer and is choosing not to do chemotherapy, due to quality of life concerns.

== Discography ==
=== Studio albums ===
| Album details | Oricon chart position | Sales |
|---|---|---|
| The Chronicles of TK: Released: April 21, 2009; Label: Warner Bros.; Format: CD, digital download, streaming | 12 | RIAJ: 600,000+ |
| The 5th Element: Released: August 17, 2010; Label: Eight72 Entertainment, Warner Bros.; Format: CD, digital download, streaming | 36 | RIAJ: 3,000+ |
| The Chronicles of TK: The Phoenix: Released: August 14, 2026; Label: Humble Sound Records; Format: Digital download, streaming | — | |

=== Mixtapes ===
Mixtape details
The Underdogs
- Released: June 7, 2024
- Label: Humble Sound Records
- Format: Digital download, streaming
The Underdogs, Vol. 2
- Released: August 9, 2024
- Label: Humble Sound Records
- Format: Digital download, streaming
Dark Horses
- Released: January 10, 2025
- Label: Humble Sound Records
- Format: Digital download, streaming

=== Singles ===
- 2005 - "Dats Wassup"
- 2007 - "I Wish You Loved Me"
- 2009
1. "Shatter'd"
2. "Woman"
3. "Lights Out"
4. "Rockstar" (promotional)
5. "You & Me Against the World" (promotional)
6. "It's Over" (promotional)
7. "Cry No More" (promotional)
8. "Do You Ever" (promotional)
9. "The Boy Is Mine" (featuring Beni)
- 2010
1. "Next Time"
2. "The Right Way"
3. "Love Hurts" (featuring Coma-Chi)
- 2015
1. "Romeo & Juliet"
2. "Inhale Exhale"
- 2016 - "Forget It All"
- 2017 - "Sleeping Alone"
- 2018 - "I Got You Babe"
- 2021 - "Writing's on the Wall"
- 2024
1. "Defeated"
2. "Can't Turn Back"
- 2026
1. "Standing on It"
2. "The Phoenix"

== Tours ==
- 2008: The Chronicles of TK Tour (Promo Tour)
- 2009: I Wish Tour (Japan)
