= Over (Lindsay Lohan song) =

2004 single by Lindsay Lohan

Single by Lindsay Lohan

from the album Speak
- B-side: "Rumors"; "To Know Your Name"
- Released: December 13, 2004
- Studio: Henson Recording (Hollywood, California)
- Genre: Pop rock
- Length: 3:36
- Label: Casablanca; Universal
- Songwriters: Kara DioGuardi; John Shanks; Lindsay Lohan
- Producers: John Shanks; Kara DioGuardi

Lindsay Lohan singles chronology
"Rumors" (2004)	"Over" (2004)	"First" (2005)

Music video
- "Over" on YouTube

"Over" is a song by American actress and singer Lindsay Lohan from her debut studio album Speak (2004). The song was written by Kara DioGuardi, John Shanks and Lohan, and produced by the former two. "Over" was released as the second single from Speak on December 13, 2004, in the United States, by Casablanca Records. Lyrically, "Over" is about how her boyfriend will not commit and that their relationship feels "on again, off again".

Critically, "Over" received positive reviews from music critics, who called the song "catchy" and praised Lohan's vocal performance. Commercially, "Over" achieved moderate success, reaching top 30 positions in Australia, Ireland and the United Kingdom. In the United States, the single peaked at number one on Billboard's Bubbling Under Hot 100 Singles chart for three weeks.

Jake Nava directed the accompanying music video for "Over", which depicts Lohan and her love interest, played by Drew Fuller, being distanced by his parents. Lohan performed "Over" in TV programs such as Good Morning America and The Ellen DeGeneres Show, in addition to online performances.

== Background and composition ==
"Over"
A 23-second sample of the song's chorus, which includes guitars and Lohan proclaiming "I can't live without you".

"Over" was written by Kara DioGuardi, John Shanks and Lohan, and produced by DioGuardi and Shanks, with Shanks playing the bass, guitar, keyboards and doing the mixing, while DioGuardi provided backing vocals. Jeff Rothschild was responsible for Lohan's vocal recording, which occurred at the Henson Recording Studios in Hollywood. He also handled the song's mixing, programming and engineering. Other engineers involved were Dave Audé and Mark Valentine. "Over" is written in the time signature of common time with a moderate tempo of 90 beats per minute. It is composed in the key of C minor with Lohan's voice spanning from C^{4} to C^{5}. According to Spence D. of IGN, "Over" begins like a song by the Cure, complete with a "mournful acoustic guitar" and a "haunting piano-tuned synth". He wrote that since the song was not penned by Robert Smith, "it quickly turns into a slow rocker in which Lohan returns to her 'can't live without you' love torn subject matter". In a 2014 interview on The Ellen DeGeneres Show, Lohan told DeGeneres the song was about her break-up with Wilmer Valderrama.

== Critical reception ==
"Over" received positive reviews from critics. While responding negatively to a majority of Speak, John Murphy of MusicOMH cited "Over" as being "actually rather good" and noted similarities between the song and the works of Michelle Branch. Nicholas Fonseca from Entertainment Weekly considered the track a "tween-slumber-party-friendly" which "is perfect for singing into your curling iron in front of the mirror".

== Chart performance ==
"Over" achieved moderate chart success around the globe. In the United States, the single reached number one on Billboard's Bubbling Under Hot 100 chart for three weeks and reached number 39 on the Mainstream Top 40 component chart. The song is Lohan's only charting single in the United Kingdom, reaching a peak of number 27 on the UK Singles Chart. In Australia, "Over" debuted at its peak of number 27 on the ARIA Charts, falling out of the chart seven weeks later. "Over" also attained the top 30 in Ireland, peaking at number 19. On the European Hot 100 Singles, "Over" managed to reach number 79.

== Music video ==
The accompanying music video for "Over" was directed by Jake Nava, who also directed the music video for Lohan's previous single "Rumors", and shot in Los Angeles. The music video was inspired by the 1999 film American Beauty.

=== Synopsis ===
In the music video, Lohan is walking home when she sees her love interest, played by Drew Fuller, looking out of a window in his house as his mother sets the table behind him. Then his father comes up to him and they begin to argue. The curtains close and Lohan continues on to her house, next door to her boyfriend's, and runs up to her bedroom. Looking out her window, she sees that he is looking back at her. As noted inside Lohan's bedroom, she is starting to experiment with rebellious adolescence. There are Teletubbies and stuffed pandas, but also posters of bands such as L7, the Dead Kennedys and CBGB. These imagery are intercut with shots of Lohan and her band playing in a garage, a pool party and also her love interest destroying his father's car in the family garage.

=== Reception ===
The music video received positive reviews from critics. IGN's Spence D. commented that "you've got a somewhat clichéd, but nonetheless hit-worthy video montage". Justin Moran, while ranking Lohan's best music videos in Paper magazine, stated,

"In the video for angry rock-pop track "Over," Lindsay stares at a neighbor boy from her bedroom window, wears too much black eye makeup, hooks up with said boy in a random trailer and cries... a lot. This video has a completely over-the-top dramatic ending with Lindsay doing donuts with the neighbor boy in a vintage car (amazing), only to be interrupted by his abusive father. Lindsay cries more, breaks through a window with her heel and shatters a lamp on the ground. Yes, Lindsay, yes. We love it when you're angry."

== Live performances ==
In order to promote the single, Lohan appeared on Sessions@AOL on December 2, 2004, where she performed "Over". Her first televised appearance was on Good Morning America, four days later, as a part of the Women Rule Concert Series, where she sang "Over" accompanied by a performance of "Rumors". While she sang "Over" with no problems, her mouth was not moving for a second during the performance of "Rumors", leading the media to accuse her of lip synching. Lohan denied that she was lip synching, claiming that there was a backing track because she had fallen ill recently. Kim Jakwerth, of Casablanca Records, supported this statement by saying, "Yes, on the first song there were background tracks, which were not on the second song." In addition to these performances, she sang the song on The Ellen DeGeneres Show on December 16. On December 14, Lohan performed "Over" and "Speak" at Yahoo's Live@Launch, where she also gave an interview.

== Track listing and formats ==
DVD single
No.	Title	Length
1.	"Over" (music video)	3:36
2.	"Over"	3:36
3.	"Rumors" (music video)	3:25
4.	"Rumors" (The Sharp Boys Vocal Mix)	7:24

European and Australian maxi single
No.	Title	Length
1.	"Over"	3:36
2.	"Over" (Full Phatt Remix)	3:39
3.	"To Know Your Name"	3:19
4.	"Over" (music video)	3:36

UK maxi single
No.	Title	Length
1.	"Over"	3:36
2.	"Rumors"	3:16
3.	"Over" (Full Phatt Remix)	3:39

== Credits and personnel ==
Credits are taken from the Speak liner notes.

Recording

- Recorded and mixed at Henson Recording Studios

Personnel

- Lindsay Lohan –songwriting, vocals
- Kara DioGuardi – songwriting, production, backing vocals
- John Shanks – songwriting, production, bass, guitar, keyboards, mixing
- Dave Audé – engineering
- Jeff Rothschild – drums, engineering, mixing, programming
- Mark Valentine – engineering

== Charts ==
Weekly chart performance for "Over"
Chart (2005)	Peak position
Australia (ARIA)	27
Austria (Ö3 Austria Top 40)	49
European Hot 100 Singles (Billboard)	76
Germany (GfK)	40
Ireland (IRMA)	19
Scotland Singles (OCC)	19
Switzerland (Schweizer Hitparade)	52
UK Singles (OCC)	27
US Bubbling Under Hot 100 (Billboard)	1
US Pop Airplay (Billboard)	39

== Release history ==
Release dates and formats for "Over"
Region	Date	Format(s)	Label	Ref.
United States	December 13, 2004	Contemporary hit radio	Casablanca	
Australia	March 28, 2005	CD single	Casablanca	
United Kingdom	April 25, 2005	CD single; DVD single	Casablanca	
Germany	May 23, 2005	CD single	Casablanca	
