= Rumors (Lindsay Lohan song) =

2004 single by Lindsay Lohan

Single by Lindsay Lohan

from the album Speak
- Released: September 27, 2004
- Studio: Poolhouse West (Encino, California); The Village (Los Angeles, California)
- Genre: Dance-pop
- Length: 3:16
- Label: Casablanca; Universal
- Songwriters: Cory Rooney; Lindsay Lohan; Taryll Jackson; T. J. Jackson
- Producer: Cory Rooney

Lindsay Lohan singles chronology
"Rumors" (2004)	"Over" (2004)

Music video
- "Rumors" on YouTube

"Rumors" is a song by American actress and singer-songwriter Lindsay Lohan from her debut studio album, Speak (2004). Originally titled "Just What It Is", the song was written and produced by Cory Rooney, while additional writing was done by Lohan, Taryll Jackson and T. J. Jackson. A dance-pop song, its lyrics allude to the constant paparazzi and media backlash regarding Lohan. "Rumors" was released as Lohan's debut single, and lead single from Speak, on September 27, 2004, by Casablanca Records.

"Rumors" received generally mixed reviews from music critics; with statements like "infectious" or "unnecessary". Commercially, the song achieved moderate success worldwide, reaching top 30 positions in Australia, Austria, Germany and Switzerland. In the United States, it peaked at No. 6 on the Billboard Bubbling Under Hot 100 Singles chart and was certified Gold by the Recording Industry Association of America (RIAA).

The accompanying music video for "Rumors" was directed by Jake Nava and depicts Lohan attending a nightclub, playing around with the paparazzi. It was nominated for Best Pop Video at the 2005 MTV Video Music Awards and reached the top position on MTV's Total Request Live. In 2014, Billboard ranked "Rumors" in its "Top 50 Forgotten Gems from the Now! series", which list songs from the series that were underrated at the time of their release.

== Background and composition ==
"Rumors"
A 20-second sample of the song's chorus features Lohan singing that she is "tired of rumors starting" and "sick of being followed", addressing the media and paparazzi.

"Rumors" was originally titled "Just What It Is". The song was written by Cory Rooney, Lindsay Lohan, Taryll Jackson and T. J. Jackson. It was also produced by Rooney, who provided keyboards and background vocals. Peter Wade Keusch assisted the production, and was responsible along with Chris Avedon for Lohan's vocal recording, which occurred at Poolhouse West and The Village in Los Angeles. Audio mixing was done by Keusch at Sony Music Studios in New York City. Christopher J. Warner provided the guitar present in the song's composition. "Rumors" is in the style of R&B. Lyrically, the song was written as a response to the paparazzi and media's backlash, both which are addressed in the chorus lines, where Lohan sings, "I'm tired of rumors starting/ I'm sick of being followed/ I'm tired of people lying/ Saying what they want about me/ Why can't they back up off me?/ Why can't they let me live?/ I'm going to do it my way/ Take this for just what it is." Spence D. of IGN noted that Lohan's vocals are "driven by snarls, breathy croons, and emotionally restrained angst", while John Murphy of musicOMH considered it "a feisty dance anthem with intelligent lyrics attacking the paparazzi and press in general".

== Critical reception ==
"Rumors" received generally mixed reviews from music critics, however, it has become one of Lohan's most recognized songs and has now been labeled as "cult pop treasure"^{^[]}. Charles Merwin of Stylus Magazine thought that "Rumors" was not a good choice for a single, stating, "in fact, for a girl, that has been tagged as America’s next sweetheart by some media outlets, it might be the worst choice of subject matter for the opening statement from a girl that automatically has more to prove to audiences because of her stature as an actress. Unfortunately, 'Rumors' is about as good as it gets." Erik Missio of ChartAttack thought that the song "presented potential for a semi-palatable debut effort", but further added that it is a "crap of a spectacularly unspectacular level." Entertainment Weekly contributor Nicholas Fonseca, however, considered "Rumors" a guilty pleasure, while Stephen Thomas Erlewine of AllMusic selected the song a Track Pick in the review of Speak. IGN's Spence D. described it as "pervasively infectious, the kind of track that will no doubt keep the dance floors sweaty and steamy for a few months to come." John Murphy of musicOMH praised "Rumors" as a departure from Speak's soft rock genre.

== Chart performance ==
"Rumors" achieved moderate commercial success worldwide. In the United States, the single peaked at number six on Billboard's Bubbling Under Hot 100 Singles chart and reached number 23 on the Mainstream Top 40 component chart. However, it was certified Gold by the Recording Industry Association of America (RIAA) in February 2005. In Australia, "Rumors" debuted at number 19 on the ARIA charts, peaking at number 10 six weeks later, while being certified Gold by the Australian Recording Industry Association (ARIA). The single also attained top 30 positions in Austria and Switzerland, and reached the top 40 in the Netherlands and Sweden. In Germany, "Rumors" debuted and peaked at number 14.

== Music video ==
Casablanca Records commissioned a music video to be directed by British director Jake Nava, who previously worked in the same year with Britney Spears on her music video for "My Prerogative", between September 11 and the early hours of September 13, 2004. The music video for "Rumors" premiered on October 14, 2004, and October 20, 2004, through Disney Channel and MTV.

=== Synopsis ===
In the beginning of the video, Lohan is followed by paparazzi as she is entering her car. It is revealed that this is a Lohan-look-alike and that the real Lohan is entering another car to go to a club. The car comes to a stop, and she then steps into an elevator and sings the first verse of the song, while she is filmed by a CCTV camera in the elevator. The next sequence shows her running through a hallway, dressed up, before getting into the club. There, she dances in the crowd, where she takes a picture of one of the paparazzi herself to get back at him. In the next sequence, she is walking slowly through the club where she finds the man who seems to be her boyfriend. She takes a seat next to her lover and they begin kissing and touching each other, all the while being constantly filmed by cameras in the club. While Lohan sings the second chorus, she is trapped in a cage in the middle of the club and the whole crowd is watching her. After this, Lohan is shown dancing in the club with her friends. At the end of the music video, Lohan and her friends enter the top of a high-rise and perform a dance routine while helicopters are circling around them. Finally, Lohan gets into a helicopter and escapes. In the end, she throws her camera away with all the pictures taken of her.

=== Reception ===
The music video for "Rumors" received very positive reviews from critics and viewers which eventually led to the video reaching the top position on the countdown of Total Request Live on the week of October 27, 2004, and was nominated on the category Best Pop Video during the 2005 MTV Video Music Awards.

== Live performances ==
Lohan performed "Rumors" on Good Morning America in December 2004. According to a MTV News staff report, "Lohan missed the cue to mouth along, forcing cameras to cut away when her mouth remained closed as she was heard singing, thanks to a backing track." A representative for Lohan, however, revealed that Lohan actually sang it live, and noted that Lohan only used a background track "to help make the song sound like it does on her album." On December 31, 2004, Lohan performed "Rumors" at MTV's Iced Out New Year's Eve 2005.

== Legacy ==
Despite having only achieved moderate commercial success, "Rumors" has since become Lohan's most recognized song of her career and has received significant attention in the years following its release. In 2020, Billboard ranked the song as Lohan's best song of her career, noting that the defiant lyric, “I'm gonna do it my way / Take this for just what it is,” would "ultimately turn into Lohan’s mantra for years to come". "Rumors" was also used during the opening of the 2020 Balmain Spring Fashion Show, in which Paper magazine noted that the song was finally getting recognition. In January 2021, the song received significant social media attention after being used on the season 13 premiere of RuPaul's Drag Race in a Lip Sync for Your Life between contestants Gottmik and Utica Queen, resulting in Lohan's name becoming a trending topic on Twitter.

== Track listing and formats ==
- CD single
1. "Rumors" – 3:16
2. "Rumors" (Full Phatt Remix) – 3:25
- CD maxi-single
1. "Rumors" – 3:16
2. "Rumors" (Full Phatt Remix) – 3:25
3. "Rumors" (Full Phatt Club Mix) – 3:49
4. "Rumors" (video) – 3:25
- Digital EP
1. "Rumors" – 3:16
2. "Rumors" (Full Phatt Remix) – 3:25
3. "Rumors" (Full Phatt Club Mix) – 3:50

== Credits and personnel ==
Credits are taken from Speak liner notes.

Recording

- Recorded at Poolhouse West and The Village at Los Angeles, California.
- Mixed at Sony Music Studios in New York City, New York.

Personnel

- Songwriting: Cory Rooney, Lindsay Lohan, Taryll Jackson, T. J. Jackson
- Production: Cory Rooney, Peter Wade Keusch
- Recording: Peter Wade Keusch, Chris Avedon
- Mixing: Peter Wade Keusch
- Keyboards: Cory Rooney
- Guitar: Christopher J. Warner
- Background vocals: Lindsay Lohan, Cory Rooney

== Charts ==
=== Weekly charts ===
Weekly chart performance for "Rumors"
Chart (2004–2005)	Peak position
Australia (ARIA)	10
Austria (Ö3 Austria Top 40)	23
Belgium (Ultratip Bubbling Under Flanders)	4
Belgium (Ultratip Bubbling Under Wallonia)	8
Canada CHR/Pop Top 30 (Radio & Records)	21
Ecuador (Notimex)	3
Germany (GfK)	14
Netherlands (Dutch Top 40 Tipparade)	5
Netherlands (Single Top 100)	31
Sweden (Sverigetopplistan)	34
Switzerland (Schweizer Hitparade)	30
US Bubbling Under Hot 100 (Billboard)	6
US Pop Airplay (Billboard)	23
US CHR/Pop Top 50 (Radio & Records)	24

=== Year-end charts ===
Year-end chart performance for "Rumors"
Chart (2005)	Position
Australia (ARIA)	65
Germany (Media Control GfK)	94

== Certifications and sales ==
Certifications and sales for "Rumors"
Region	Certification	Certified units/sales
Australia (ARIA)	Gold	35,000^{^}
United States (RIAA)	Gold	500,000^{*}
^{*} Sales figures based on certification alone.^{^} Shipments figures based on certification alone.

== Release history ==
Release dates and formats for "Rumors"
Region	Date	Format	Label	Ref.
United States	September 27, 2004	Contemporary hit radio	Casablanca	
Japan	January 26, 2005	CD	Casablanca	
Germany	February 21, 2005	CD	Casablanca	
Germany	April 18, 2005	CD	Casablanca	
