= A Little More Personal (Raw) =

A Little More Personal (RAW)

Studio album by Lindsay Lohan
- Released: November 30, 2005
- Recorded: 2004–2005
- Studio: Rocket Carousel (Los Angeles); The Beach House (Long Island); Ruby Red (Atlanta); Zi Music West (Los Angeles); Loho (New York City); Ocean Way (Los Angeles); Skip Saylor (Los Angeles); Sony Music (New York City); NRG Recording
- Genre: Pop rock
- Length: 43:21
- Label: Casablanca
- Producer: Greg Wells; Kara DioGuardi; Butch Walker; Ben Moody

Lindsay Lohan chronology
Speak (2004)	A Little More Personal (RAW) (2005)

Singles from A Little More Personal
- 1. "Confessions of a Broken Heart (Daughter to Father)" Released: October 18, 2005

A Little More Personal (Raw) (stylized A Little More Personal (RAW)) is the second studio album by American actress and singer Lindsay Lohan, released on November 30, 2005, by Casablanca Records. The album features darker material than Lohan's debut studio album, Speak (2004). Recording sessions took place in several locations, including at Lohan's trailer during the principal photography of Herbie: Fully Loaded, where she recorded her vocals for the album's lead single, "Confessions of a Broken Heart (Daughter to Father)".

The album received mixed reviews from music critics, who praised Lohan's ambition and vocals, despite considering it a weak album. A Little More Personal (Raw) charted mildly compared to Speak, debuting (and also peaking) at number 20 on the US Billboard 200, with first-week sales of 82,000 copies. However, it was certified Gold by the Recording Industry Association of America (RIAA) for shipments of over 500,000 copies. It was also certified Gold in Taiwan. Lohan promoted the album with a few television appearances, including at MTV's Total Request Live, The Ellen DeGeneres Show and the 33rd Annual American Music Awards. Lohan included her songwriting on seven out of the album's twelve songs and was the album's executive producer.

== Background and recording ==
During the shoot of the music video for her single "First", Lohan revealed in an interview with MTV that she was preparing her sophomore studio album. "When you get into the studio, everything just comes out," she said. "All your creative juices are there. I don't [want to] leave. I'll still be in there until all hours, and it's nice to be able to do that." Lohan began writing lyrics for the album in June 2005, after the last single from her previous album had been released. "I've been writing a lot, almost every night," she said. "There's been a lot going on [in my life lately], and I think people can find that escape in hobbies that they do. I don't do yoga or anything, but some people use that. Everyone has their own thing, and I use writing." The pop rock album features a darker theme compared to Lohan's previous album.

"Confessions of a Broken Heart (Daughter to Father)", the lead single and opening track of the album, was written by Lohan primarily as a letter to her father, Michael, who was incarcerated in June 2005 after surviving a car crash for which he was charged with driving under the influence of alcohol. Additional writing and song production were handled by Butch Walker, Greg Wells, and Kara DioGuardi. DioGuardi revealed: "If you solo the vocals you'll hear race cars, because we brought the studio to [Lindsay's] trailer on Herbie: Fully Loaded. I'm not kidding! She had no time to do the record, so she would be on her lunch break, and I'd be like, 'Throw that thing down your throat and get over here, 'cause we got to finish these vocals!' So I sat for 14 hours on the set and would grab her for, like, 10 minutes at a time. The poor girl. That's the reality of young Hollywood. When they're hot, they're worked to death. It was 18/20-hour days. ... And I swear: 'Vroom! Vroom!' You can hear it in the back." "My Innocence" is also about Lohan's father. Lohan covered two songs for the album: "I Want You to Want Me" by Cheap Trick and "Edge of Seventeen" by Stevie Nicks.

== Critical reception ==
Professional ratings
Aggregate scores
Source	Rating
Metacritic	50/100
Review scores
Source	Rating
AllMusic	3/5 stars
Entertainment Weekly	B−
Los Angeles Times	1.5/4 stars
The New York Times	(average)
PopMatters	3/10 stars
Rolling Stone	2/5 stars
Slant Magazine	2.5/5 stars

A Little More Personal (Raw) received mostly mixed reviews from music critics. According to the review aggregator Metacritic, the album holds a score of 50 out of 100 based on nine reviews. Stephen Thomas Erlewine of AllMusic gave the album three stars out of five, saying: "Lindsay Lohan clearly spells out her ambition in the title to her second album, A Little More Personal (Raw)—she's going to shed the glitzy trappings of her debut, Speak, and dig down deep in her heart, letting feelings flood onto the page." Erlewine also stated that even though the album "is far from being totally successful, it is an intriguing mash-up of heart and commerce. And it does suggest one thing that Speak never did: Lindsay Lohan may have an artistic vision as a recording artist, which is indeed a huge step forward." Entertainment Weekly's Leah Greenblatt said, "Like so many pop records today, Personal has more than its share of filler, and like all teenagers, Lohan contradicts herself. [...] Perhaps Personal's vulnerability is calculated, and its rawness a misnomer, or maybe she's really opening up. We'll probably never know. Lindsay may no longer be on the edge of 17, but being 19, troubled, and ridiculously famous can cut pretty deep, so props to her for letting us see her bleed—just a little."

Brian Hiatt of Rolling Stone said Lohan "makes a fatal mistake on her second album: She tries to, like, express herself", while a Los Angeles Times critic also gave the album a negative review, claiming that "for most of the album, [Lohan] sounds like any other self-absorbed teen, yearning to be Alanis, Gwen, and even Stevie Nicks." Whitney Strub of PopMatters was strongly critical of the album, scoring it three out of 10 stars, writing: "What can one expect from an album that promises to get more personal... while combining blandness, banality, and vapidity". Sal Cinquemani of Slant Magazine considered A Little More Personal (Raw) "more consistent than its predecessor, and it's not a bad listen by any means, but for all the so-called weighty subject matter, there's not much meat on these bones". Keith Caulfield of Billboard considered the "rockin' title track and the excellent thump-thump of 'Who Loves You'" as standouts, assessing that "there is an enjoyable album here."

== Commercial performance ==
A Little More Personal (Raw) debuted at number 20 on the US Billboard 200 with first week sales of 82,000. The album is certified Gold in the United States by the RIAA for 500,000 copies in shipment. As of May 2008, A Little More Personal (Raw) has sold over 305,000 copies in the United States. In Taiwan, the album also received a Gold certification.

== Promotion ==
Following the album's release, A Little More Personal (Raw) reportedly was certified Gold in Taiwan, and that Lohan was going on tour with the album in the country. "I just found this out today – my album went Gold there. It was a great feeling because it was very unexpected", Lohan revealed. "I would love to (tour Taiwan). I haven't toured at all at this point, but I would really love to do that. It's a great feeling to know that people in other places and other countries are aware of my music and what I do". For unknown reasons the tour didn't happen. However, as a thank you to the fans in Taiwan, both her albums were released there as deluxe editions, with Speak being released with a bonus VCD and A Little More Personal (Raw) being released with a bonus calendar and a promotional poster. Lohan promoted the album in a few television appearances, including at MTV's TRL on November 11, where she performed "Confessions of a Broken Heart (Daughter to Father)" and her cover of "I Want You to Want Me", and on the day of the album's release, The Tonight Show with Jay Leno on November 24, the Late Night with Conan O'Brien on December 7, and at The Ellen DeGeneres Show on December 14. Lohan also performed "Confessions of a Broken Heart (Daughter to Father)" and her cover of "Edge of Seventeen" at the 33rd Annual American Music Awards on November 22. Lohan was scheduled to appear on Live with Regis and Kelly the day of the album's release but pulled out five minutes after the show started as the New York Post reported her having food poisoning, before appearing on MTV's TRL later that day.

=== Singles ===
"Confessions of a Broken Heart (Daughter to Father)" was previewed before the album's release at AOL Music's First Listen on September 30, 2005. It was made available for purchase as a digital download and was sent to contemporary hit radio on October 18, 2005. An accompanying music video for the song, directed by Lohan herself, references her father Michael's drunkenness and alleged domestic abuse, and was released on October 25, 2005. As a response to the music video, Lohan's father wrote a letter to the New York Daily News, saying, "while I always considered and expressed how truly blessed Lindsay, as well as my other children, are, I never realized how blessed I am to have a daughter as amazing as Lindsay. Hold onto my shirt honey, soon enough you'll be able to hold on to me!" "Confessions of a Broken Heart (Daughter to Father)" achieved moderate chart success worldwide, reaching number seven in Australia on the week of its debut on chart. It spent 13 weeks on the chart, peaking at number 45 on the last. In Austria, it reached number 74 on the week of March 24, 2006, dropping the chart in the following. In the United States, it peaked at number 14 on the Digital Songs chart on the week of December 3, 2005, while reaching number 57 on Billboard Hot 100 on the week of December 24, 2005. It was Lohan's first and only entry, to date, on the Billboard Hot 100.

== Track listing ==
No.	Title	Writer(s)	Producer(s)	Length
1.	"Confessions of a Broken Heart (Daughter to Father)"	Lindsay Lohan; Kara DioGuardi; Greg Wells	DioGuardi; Wells	3:41
2.	"Black Hole"	DioGuardi; Wells; Louise Goffin	DioGuardi; Wells	4:02
3.	"I Live for the Day"	Desmond Child; Andreas Carlsson; Ethan Mentzer; Ben Romans	DioGuardi; Wells	3:10
4.	"I Want You to Want Me"	Rick Nielsen	DioGuardi; Butch Walker	3:09
5.	"My Innocence"	Lohan; DioGuardi; Wells	DioGuardi; Wells	4:18
6.	"A Little More Personal"	Lohan; DioGuardi; Walker	DioGuardi; Walker	2:59
7.	"If It's Alright"	Lohan; DioGuardi; Walker	DioGuardi; Walker	4:06
8.	"If You Were Me"	Lohan; DioGuardi; Wells	DioGuardi; Wells	2:54
9.	"Fastlane"	Lohan; DioGuardi; Ben Moody; Mitch Allan	Moody	3:24
10.	"Edge of Seventeen"	Stevie Nicks	Moody	4:22
11.	"Who Loves You"	DioGuardi; Wells	DioGuardi; Wells	3:50
12.	"A Beautiful Life (La Bella Vita)"	Lohan; DioGuardi; Michelle Lewis; Charlton Pettus	DioGuardi; Wells	3:26
Total length:				43:21

== Personnel ==
Credits adapted from the album's liner notes.

- Lindsay Lohan – primary artist, vocals, concept, executive producer
- Ashley Arrison – backing vocals
- Claire Aude – engineer
- A. Brien – bass
- Jeb Brien – contributor
- Sandy Brummels – art direction
- David Campbell – string arrangements
- Dan Certa – engineer
- Daniel Chase – programming
- Mark Colbert – drums
- Kara DioGuardi – backing vocals, arranger, producer, executive producer
- Darren Dodd – drums
- Stephen Finfer – production liaison
- Louise Goffin – piano
- Michael Herring – guitar
- Michael Lattonzi – vocal engineer
- Christian Frederick Sr. Martin – contributor
- Steve McMillan – engineer, vocal engineer
- Vlado Meller – mastering
- Ben Moody – arranger, programming, producer
- Tim Myers – bass
- Marty O'Brien – bass
- Joanne Oriti – contributor
- Al Smith – contributor
- Chris Steffen – engineer
- Butch Walker – bass, guitar, keyboards, arranger, producer
- Greg Wells – arranger, producer
- Joe Zook – engineer

== Charts and certifications ==
=== Charts ===
Chart (2005–2006)	Peak position
Australian Albums (ARIA)	88
Canadian Albums (Nielsen SoundScan)	43
Japanese Albums (Oricon)	44
Taiwanese Albums (Five Music)	1
US Billboard 200	20

=== Certifications ===
Region	Certification	Certified units/sales
United States (RIAA)	Gold	500,000^{^}
^{^} Shipments figures based on certification alone.

== Release history ==
Release dates and formats for A Little More Personal (Raw)
Region	Date	Format	Label	Ref.
Japan	November 30, 2005	CD	Casablanca	
Canada	December 6, 2005	CD	Casablanca	
United States	December 6, 2005	CD	Casablanca	
Germany	January 10, 2006	CD	Casablanca	
