= Speak (Lindsay Lohan album) =

Studio album by Lindsay Lohan
- Released: December 7, 2004
- Genres: Pop rock; dance-pop; arena rock; soft rock
- Length: 37:54
- Label: Casablanca
- Producers: John Shanks; Kara DioGuardi; Andreas Carlsson; Kristian Lundin; Kalle Engstrom; David Eriksen; Cory Rooney

Lindsay Lohan chronology
Speak (2004)	A Little More Personal (Raw) (2005)

Singles from Speak
- 1. "Rumors" Released: September 27, 2004; 2. "Over" Released: December 13, 2004; 3. "First" Released: May 10, 2005

Speak is the debut studio album by American actress and singer Lindsay Lohan, released on December 7, 2004, by Casablanca Records.

Speak was the first high-seller from Casablanca in several years, selling one million copies in the United States. Speak received mixed reviews from music critics, with the most sympathetic critics commenting that Lohan "isn't a bad singer, but not an extraordinary singer either." In the United States, Speak peaked at number four on the Billboard 200 and was certified platinum by the Recording Industry Association of America (RIAA). In Germany, Speak debuted at number 53 and took four weeks to complete its chart run.

The first two singles from Speak, "Rumors" and "Over", failed to crack the Billboard Hot 100 chart. However, they both did well internationally in countries such as Australia, Ireland and the United Kingdom. "Rumors" peaked at number six on the Bubbling Under Hot 100 chart and also did well in Australia and Germany, where it reached number 14. The accompanying music video for "Rumors" was nominated for "Best Pop Video" at the 2005 MTV Video Music Awards. Both songs received heavy airplay on MTV's Total Request Live. The third and final single, "First", was released to promote the 2005 film Herbie: Fully Loaded. "First" earned small success in Australia and Germany. Lohan promoted the album by performing the singles in a number of live appearances.

== Background ==
Lohan planned on releasing an album in the summer of 2001, according to her official website, llrocks.com. No album was released in 2001, but Lohan had begun recording demo tracks with Emilio Estefan Jr. He and his wife, Gloria, signed Lohan a five-album production deal in September 2002. "I am extremely excited to be working with Emilio. I am surrounded by a group of very talented people whom have made me feel like part of their family", Lohan said to the press. Also in September, Lohan landed the role as the daughter in Disney's 2003 remake of Freaky Friday, which required her to learn how to play the guitar and to sing. Lohan recorded a song for the soundtrack, "Ultimate", which was released to Radio Disney to help promote the film. It peaked at number 18 on Radio Disney's Top 30. Lohan announced that the song was separate from her singing career, since many teen idols such as Hilary Duff and Raven-Symoné were expanding their careers from acting to singing.

In 2003, Lohan recorded four songs including a Radio Disney hit, "Drama Queen (That Girl)", that were released for the soundtrack to the 2004 film Confessions of a Teenage Drama Queen. Lohan began writing the tracks on her album in April 2004. "I write a lot of lyrics and I'm involved in the producing process, because it's like, if I'm singing it, I want it to be something that I can relate to", Lohan said. "I'm just trying to feel it out and see where it goes. I'm playing guitar and I also love to dance, so [the music will be] somewhere along the lines of hip-hop and rock." She had begun working with Diane Warren and Randy Jackson, who were going to help write and produce her album. Warren wrote the song "I Decide" for Lohan, which was originally going to be on her album. When Lohan decided not to collaborate with Warren and Jackson, "I Decide" was instead released on the soundtrack to the 2004 film The Princess Diaries 2: Royal Engagement and on Radio Disney.

By 2004, Lohan's deal with Emilio Estefan Jr. had been cancelled and Lohan began looking for producers for her album. When asked by MTV about what label she would be working with, Lohan said, "I met with Jive, Universal and I spoke to someone at Bad Boy the other day, which would be kind of cool, but we'll see what happens." In the summer, Lohan revealed that she had signed a deal with Casablanca Records, whose parent company is Universal Music Group. Kara DioGuardi and John Shanks both wrote and produced ten of the tracks, six with Lohan. Cory Rooney produced her first single, "Rumors," with Taryll and T. J. Jackson, sons of Tito Jackson.

== Recording ==
Production on the album and the film were halted on October 21, 2004, when Lohan was rushed to Cedars-Sinai Medical Center, reportedly for exhaustion and a high fever of 103 degrees. Lohan ended up having a kidney infection and was also in the middle of a family crisis when her father Michael was arrested earlier that year. After staying in the hospital for six days, Lohan was released and returned to set to finish filming the film and recording her album. "I was over-scheduling myself", Lohan said in her appearance on The Ellen DeGeneres Show, "It's important to say no." Her album's original release date was in November, but was pushed back to December 7 to let Lohan finish recording her album after her hospital stay.

According to Rodney Jerkins, Lohan recorded a track written by him titled "Extraordinary." The song, which is a rock song, never made it to the final cut of the album. "We're just waiting to get into the studio and cut it. I know her schedule is crazy hectic as well as mine. So we're going to find that day where we can get it and cut it, probably out here in L.A. or whatever. It should be fun, because she's got this whole thing about, you know, this little bad-girl image that everyone's trying to put on her, you know what I mean? Basically, the record that we did is basically saying, you know, 'I'm not ordinary. Bottom line, I'm different.'"

== Composition ==
Speak features different styles of music such as pop rock, dance-pop, arena rock and soft rock ballads. "I wanted to have a mixture like that because I love those kinds of club tracks that you can listen to before you go out at night with all your friends. And I also wanted stuff that was a little bit more rock that you could get into if you were like angry or depressed or sad or that. I wanted to be able to touch upon all those feelings and I wanted to speak about all different things, too, which is why I titled the album Speak", Lohan said in an interview with IGN. The lead single, "Rumors", has been called a "bass-heavy, angry club anthem" by Rolling Stone.

In the opening tracks on the album, Lohan sings about her relationship with her boyfriend, possibly Valderrama. The Madonna-esque title track is about communicating with her boyfriend, while "Magnet" states that she keeps coming back for more from him. IGN said that "Over", the second single, "begins like a Cure track, complete with mournful acoustic guitar and haunting piano-tuned synth."

== Critical reception ==
Professional ratings
Review scores
Source	Rating
AllMusic	2/5 stars
Entertainment Weekly	C
Rolling Stone	2/5 stars
Slant Magazine	2/5 stars
Stylus Magazine	D+

Speak received mixed reviews from music critics. CD Universe said "'Speak' proves that Lohan has the mettle and talent necessary to compete with other young pop superstars." Stephen Thomas Erlewine of Allmusic was very critical of the album, saying it "was recorded quickly and rushed into the stores" such that "the whole thing is a slick, ugly nadir of 2000s pop culture." He called her music "a blend of old-fashioned, Britney-styled dance-pop and the anthemic, arena rock sound pioneered by fellow tween stars Hilary Duff and Ashlee Simpson. [However,] Lohan stands apart from the pack with her party-ready attitude and her husky voice."

IGN gave the album a mixed review, stating, "As with her contemporaries—Britney, Christina, Ashlee, Avril, Hilary—it remains to be seen if she will transcend the generic pop princess model and grow into a mature, insightful artist. For now, Speak offers up sugar coated, prefab pop that is easily digested, but just as easily forgotten." Entertainment Weekly also gave the album a C, stating "The Mean Girls star's debut album has some guilty pleasures: "Rumors" dramatically slams the very stalkerazzi who made her a household name, while the tween-slumber-party-friendly "Over" is perfect for singing into your curling iron in front of the mirror. But somewhere, Avril Lavigne — whose influence is clearly at work here — is rolling her eyes." People music critic Chuck Arnold gave the album a "promising" review, stating that the album is a "competent collection of teen pop."

== Commercial performance ==
Speak debuted at number four on the US Billboard 200 chart with first-week sales of over 261,000 copies, marking Lohan's highest weekly sales. It was certified Platinum by the RIAA and has sold over 1.1 million copies in the United States. To date, the album has sold 2.5 million copies worldwide.

== Promotion ==
To promote Speak, Lohan performed several times in the United States. She appeared on Sessions@AOL on December 2, where she performed "Rumors", "Over", and "Speak". Her first televised appearance was on Good Morning America on December 6, as a part of the Women Rule Concert Series. While she sang "Over" with no problems, her mouth did not move for a second during the performance of "Rumors". Lohan denied that she was lip syncing, claiming that there was a backing track because she had recently fallen ill and that the song had to be enhanced from an electro-pop song to an acoustic version. Kim Jakwerth of Casablanca Records supported this statement, saying: "She did not lip-synch. Lindsay sang 100 percent live. Her band played 100 percent live. The background singers were 100 percent live. Yes, on the first song there were background tracks, which were not on the second song." To further promote the album, Lohan also made appearances on TEENick on December 3, MTV's TRL on the day of the album's release, Live with Regis and Kelly on December 9, the Z100 Jingle Ball on December 10, and The Tonight Show with Jay Leno on December 13.

On December 14, Lohan performed "Over" and "Speak" at Yahoo's Live@Launch, where she also gave an interview. Her second televised appearance was on The Ellen DeGeneres Show on December 16, where she performed "Over". Her third and final televised appearance to promote the album was on December 31, where she performed "Rumors" on MTV's Iced Out New Year's Eve 2005. On May 14, 2005, Lohan performed at KIIS-FM's Wango Tango. She performed "First" and "Speak", sharing the bill with other performers such as Kelly Clarkson, The Black Eyed Peas, and Gwen Stefani. In between songs, Lohan mentioned that this was a rare live performance. In an interview, she mentioned the possibility of touring in Japan: "I start shooting my next movie Lady Luck which will come out 2005 as well probably just a little bit later. Then hopefully more singles to come. I'll be recording another album by then. Maybe touring in Japan and everywhere. That'll be nice." She also expressed an interest in touring Taiwan: "I would love to [tour Taiwan]. I haven't toured at all at this point, but I would really love to do that. It's a great feeling to know that people in other places and other countries are aware of my music and what I do", Lohan told reporters.

=== Singles ===
"Speak"
A sample of "Speak", which was originally intended to be the album's third single.

"Rumors" was released as the album's lead single on September 21, 2004. It peaked at number six on Billboard's Bubbling Under Hot 100 Singles chart. Its accompanying music video received heavy airplay on MTV's TRL. "Rumors" was certified Gold by the Recording Industry Association of America (RIAA) due to strong digital downloads. The song was nominated for "Best Pop Video" at the 2005 MTV Video Music Awards. "Over" was released as the second single on December 14, 2004. It spent three weeks at number one on the Bubbling Under Hot 100 Singles chart, but was less successful than "Rumors". "Over" was the only single released in the United Kingdom. Its music video was also played substantially on TRL before having to be retired. Both songs received substantial radio airplay.

The album's title track, "Speak", was planned to be released as the third single. Lohan promoted the song by playing it at Sessions@AOL, and Francis Lawrence was slated to direct the music video. Instead, "First" was released on May 10, 2005. It was also the first single released from the Herbie: Fully Loaded soundtrack. "First" became a hit in Latin America and parts of Europe, but was unsuccessful on US charts.

== Track listing ==
Credits adapted from the album's liner notes

No.	Title	Writer(s)	Producer(s)	Length
1.	"First"	John Shanks; Kara DioGuardi	Shanks; DioGuardi	3:29
2.	"Nobody 'Til You"	Shanks; DioGuardi	Shanks; DioGuardi	3:37
3.	"Symptoms of You"	Lindsay Lohan; Andreas Carlsson; Savan Kotecha; Lisa Greene	Shanks; DioGuardi; Carlsson	2:55
4.	"Speak"	Shanks; Lohan; DioGuardi	Shanks; DioGuardi	3:46
5.	"Over"	Shanks; Lohan; DioGuardi	Shanks; DioGuardi	3:36
6.	"Something I Never Had"	Shanks; Shelly Peiken	Shanks; DioGuardi	3:38
7.	"Anything but Me"	Shanks; Lohan; DioGuardi	Shanks; DioGuardi	3:16
8.	"Disconnected"	Kristian Lundin; Carl Falk; Didrik Thott; Sebastian Thott; Kotecha; Carl Bjorsell; Jake Schulze	Shanks; DioGuardi; Lundin; Kalle Engstrom	3:34
9.	"To Know Your Name"	David Eriksen; Tom Nichols	Eriksen	3:19
10.	"Very Last Moment in Time"	Troy Verges; Steve Robson; Hillary Lindsey	Shanks; DioGuardi	3:28
11.	"Rumors" (bonus track)	Lohan; Cory Rooney; Taryll Jackson; TJ Jackson	Rooney; Peter Wade Keusch^{[a]}	3:16
Total length:				37:54

International edition, digital reissue and 2020 vinyl release
No.	Title	Writer(s)	Producer(s)	Length
11.	"Magnet"	DioGuardi; Jimmy Harry	Shanks; DioGuardi; Harry	3:14
12.	"Rumors" (bonus track)	Lohan; Rooney; Jackson; Jackson	Rooney; Keusch^{[a]}	3:16
Total length:				41:08

UK bonus track
No.	Title	Length
13.	"Rumors" (Full Phatt Remix)	3:25

Japanese bonus tracks
No.	Title	Length
13.	"Rumors" (Sharp Boys Remix Radio Edit)	3:44
14.	"Over" (Full Phatt Remix)	3:39

Notes

- ^{^a} signifies a co-producer

== Personnel ==
- Dave Audé – engineer
- Chris Avedon – engineer
- Lauren Bialek – production coordination
- Charlie Bisharat – violin, concertmaster
- Sandy Brummels – creative director
- Denyse Buffam – viola
- David Campbell – string arrangements
- Roberto Cani – violin
- Andreas Carlson – guitar, backing vocals, producer, engineer
- Vinnie Colaiuta – drums
- Larry Corbett – cello
- Mario Diaz de Leon – violin
- Kara DioGuardi – backing vocals, producer
- Peter Wade Keusch – mixing, co-producer, engineer
- Kalle Engstrom – bass, keyboards, programming, producer, engineer
- David Eriksen – drums, backing vocals, producer, engineer, keyboard programming
- Charlie Falk – guitar
- Lars Fox – engineer
- Armen Garabedian – violin
- Berj Garabedian – violin
- Lior Goldenberg – mixing
- Alan Grunfeld – violin
- Jimmy Harry – producer
- George Holz – photography
- Ted Jensen – mastering
- Suzie Katayama – cello
- Peter Kent – violin
- Jason Lader – keyboard programming
- Lindsay Lohan – lead vocals
- Kristian Lundin – keyboards, programming, producer, engineer
- Darrin McCann – viola
- Tommy Mottola – executive producer
- Jamie Muhoberac – keyboards
- Pablo Munguia – engineer
- Anna Nordell – backing vocals
- Börge Petersen Överlei – guitar
- Shelly Peiken – backing vocals
- Herb Powers – mastering
- Bill Richards – product manager
- Matthew Rolston – photography
- Cory Rooney – keyboards, backing vocals, producer
- Jeff Rothschild – drums, programming, engineer, mixing
- John Shanks – guitar, drums, bass, keyboards, producer, mixing
- Martin Sjolie – engineer, assistant producer
- Harry "Slick" Sommerdahl – bass, drums, keyboards, engineer
- Joe Spix – hand lettering
- Sarah Thornblade – violin
- Mark Valentine – engineer
- Dave Way – mixing
- Christopher J. Wormer – guitar

== Charts ==
=== Weekly charts ===
Chart (2004–05)	Peak position
Australian Albums (ARIA)	57
Austrian Albums (Ö3 Austria)	36
Canadian Albums (Billboard)	9
German Albums (Offizielle Top 100)	53
Japanese Albums (Oricon)	19
Taiwanese Albums (Five Music)	1
US Billboard 200	4

=== Year-end charts ===
Chart (2005)	Position
US Billboard 200	62

== Certifications ==
Region	Certification	Certified units/sales
United States (RIAA)	Platinum	1,000,000^{^}
^{^} Shipments figures based on certification alone.

== Release history ==
Release dates and formats for Speak
Region	Date	Format	Label	Ref.
Canada	December 7, 2004	CD	Casablanca	
United States	December 7, 2004	CD	Casablanca	
Japan	January 26, 2005	CD	Casablanca	
Germany	March 25, 2005	CD	Casablanca	
United Kingdom	April 4, 2005	CD	Casablanca	
