= Confessions of a Broken Heart (Daughter to Father) =

2005 single by Lindsay Lohan

Single by Lindsay Lohan

from the album A Little More Personal (Raw)
- B-side: "My Innocence"
- Released: October 18, 2005
- Recorded: 2004
- Genre: Pop rock
- Length: 3:41
- Label: Casablanca
- Songwriters: Lindsay Lohan; Kara DioGuardi; Greg Wells
- Producers: Greg Wells; Kara DioGuardi

Lindsay Lohan singles chronology
"First" (2005)	"Confessions of a Broken Heart (Daughter to Father)" (2005)	"Bossy" (2008)

Music video
- "Confessions of a Broken Heart (Daughter to Father)" on YouTube

"Confessions of a Broken Heart (Daughter to Father)" is a song by American actress and singer Lindsay Lohan from her second studio album A Little More Personal (Raw) (2005). The song was written by Lohan as a letter to her father Michael, who survived a car crash for which he was charged with driving under the influence. Additional writing and production was done by Kara DioGuardi and Greg Wells, while Lohan recorded her vocals on her trailer during the filming of Herbie: Fully Loaded in late 2004. "Confessions of a Broken Heart (Daughter to Father)" was first previewed at AOL Music's First Listen on September 30, 2005, and was sent to radio in the United States on October 18, 2005, by Casablanca Records as the lead single from A Little More Personal (Raw).

"Confessions of a Broken Heart (Daughter to Father)" received mixed reviews from music critics, who praised Lohan's conviction on the song, but considering it a cliché "I-hate-you-Daddy" lament. The single achieved mild commercial success, peaking at number seven in Australia, number 74 in Austria and at number 57 on the US Billboard Hot 100. The accompanying music video, directed by Lohan herself, portrays Lohan and her actual sister Aliana, listening to her parents arguing and fighting in the living room of their home. "Confessions of a Broken Heart (Daughter to Father)" was performed by Lohan at the 33rd Annual American Music Awards.

== Background and release ==
"Confessions of a Broken Heart (Daughter to Father)"
A 22 second sample of the song's chorus, which features Lohan asking if her father ever loved her.

"Confessions of a Broken Heart (Daughter to Father)" was written by Lohan as a letter to her father, who was incarcerated in June 2005 after surviving a car crash for which he was charged with a DUI. Additional writing and song production was done by Greg Wells and Kara DioGuardi, who revealed, "If you solo the vocals you'll hear race cars, because we brought the studio to [Lindsay's] trailer on Herbie: Fully Loaded. I'm not kidding! She had no time to do the record, so she would be on her lunch break, and I'd be like, 'Throw that thing down your throat and get over here, 'cause we got to finish these vocals!' So I sat for 14 hours on the set and would grab her for, like, 10 minutes at a time. The poor girl. That's the reality of young Hollywood. When they're hot, they're worked to death. It was 18/20-hour days. ... And I swear: 'Vroom! Vroom!' You can hear it in the back." "Confessions of a Broken Heart (Daughter to Father)" was first previewed at AOL Music's First Listen on September 30, 2005.

== Composition ==
According to the digital music sheet published at Musicnotes.com, the song is composed in the key of G♯ minor and is set in time signature of common time with a tempo of 120 beats per minute, while Lohan's vocal range spans from F♯_{3} to D♯_{5}. When asked about the lyrical content of the song, Lohan revealed, "A lot of people go through family issues, abuse and that kind of thing. I think it's important to show that other people go through it. [...] I hope [my father] see what I say in the song is, 'I love you,' so many times, that I need him and the crazy things in my life. I hope he sees the positive side of the video rather than the negative. The video is kind of offensive, but it is very raw. He's my father. I need someone to walk me down the aisle when I get married." The single's B-side, "My Innocence", features a similar message to Lohan's father.

== Critical reception ==
Lindsay Lohan clearly spells out her ambition in the title to her second album, A Little More Personal (Raw)—she's going to shed the glitzy trappings of her debut Speak, and dig down deep in her heart, letting feelings flood onto the page. And, for better and worse, that's exactly what she does, nowhere more explicitly than the opening track (and lead single), "Confessions of a Broken Heart (Daughter to Father)," where she rails against her absentee father, whose transgressions and addictions have been gleefully chronicled by tabloids. It's a bracing minor-key assault that's honest to a fault, particularly since it's not especially artful, yet it sets the tone for the rest of the album with its somber, self-conscious confession.

— Stephen Thomas Erlewine of AllMusic commenting about the album and song in question.

"Confessions of a Broken Heart (Daughter to Father)" received mixed reviews from critics. Brian Hiatt of Rolling Stone noted that "the album de-emphasizes the (very) guilty pop pleasures of her 2004 debut in favor of leaden I-hate-you-Daddy laments such as 'Confessions of a Broken Heart' and 'My Innocence'". Entertainment Weekly writer Leah Greenblatt commented that "it's hard to imagine a more explicit snapshot of the highly publicized family problems that have plagued the star than 'Confessions of a Broken Heart (Daughter to Father)'". PopMatters's Whitney Strub said "Confessions of a Broken Heart (Daughter to Father)" "immediately commences with a line about 'wait[ing] for the postman to bring me a letter', which suggests songwriters dipping into the well of cliché without worrying about freshness", while commenting that "the world might not need another version of Britney Spears' 'E-Mail My Heart', but good lord, that song came out in 1999. Perhaps a text-message might arrive faster than snail-mail in late 2005, should Lohan's song-persona deign to enter the 21st century".

== Chart performance ==
"Confessions of a Broken Heart (Daughter to Father)" achieved mild chart success around the globe, including reaching number seven in Australia on the week of its debut on chart. The single spent 13 weeks on the chart, peaking at number 45 on the last. In Austria, the single reached number 74 on the week of March 24, 2006. In the United States, the single peaked at number 14 on Billboard's Digital Songs chart on the week of December 3, 2005, while reaching number 57 on Billboard Hot 100 on the week of December 24, 2005, becoming her first and only single, to date, to chart on the Billboard Hot 100.

== Music video ==
Two screenshots of the music video, showing Lohan and her sister Aliana in the latter's bedroom, listening to their parents argue in the living room.

The music video for "Confessions of a Broken Heart (Daughter to Father)" was directed by Lohan in Chelsea, Manhattan, on September 28 and 29, 2005. It references her father's alcoholism and alleged domestic abuse. Tommy Mottola, head of Casablanca Records, encouraged Lohan to take the role of director: "'No one knows this song better than you, no one knows this situation better than you.' It's a lot to take on, but I told her she's ready, and we'll give her all the support she needs." Lohan said that the video's storefront setting was chosen because, in her words, "my life is on display". Lohan also wanted to break a mirror during the bathroom scenes, but settled on cracking it. Assistant director Jeb Bryan said to Lohan: "This is real glass, Lindsay. We weren't prepared for you to break these things. [...] Do you want this slow motion? Regular frame will make it more violent." She responded, "I don't want it to be too pretty". The music video first aired on MTV's Making the Video, and was later released to the iTunes Store on October 25, 2005.

=== Synopsis ===
In the music video, Lohan hides in the bathroom and prays the rosary as her parents, Michael and Dina (played by Drake Andrew and Victoria Hay, respectively), argue and fight in the living room. Her sister, Aliana (who plays herself), goes to her bedroom after coming home from ballet class, breaks into tears, and also prays the rosary. The three rooms are shown behind a department store window, outside of which a crowd of observers forms. At the end of the video, Lohan stands behind the glass as photographs of memories fly up onto it, which she then shatters to break out.

=== Reception ===
When reviewing the video, VH1 stated that "'Daddy issues' is an understatement when it comes to this melodramatic—and we admit, effective—clip." As a response to the music video, Lohan's father wrote a letter to the New York Daily News, saying: "While I always considered and expressed how truly blessed Lindsay, as well as my other children are, I never realized how blessed I am to have a daughter as amazing as Lindsay. Hold onto my shirt honey, soon enough you'll be able to hold on to me!"

== Track listing and formats ==
- CD single
1. "Confessions of a Broken Heart (Daughter to Father)" – 3:41
2. "Confessions of a Broken Heart (Daughter to Father)" (Dave Audé Remix) – 4:45
3. "My Innocence" – 4:19
4. "Confessions of a Broken Heart (Daughter to Father)" (music video) – 4:01
- Digital download
1. "Confessions of a Broken Heart (Daughter to Father)" – 3:41
2. "Confessions of a Broken Heart (Daughter to Father)" (Dave Audé Remix) – 4:45
3. "My Innocence" – 4:19

== Charts ==
=== Weekly charts ===
Weekly chart performance for "Confessions of a Broken Heart (Daughter to Father)"
Chart (2005–2006)	Peak position
Australia (ARIA)	7
Austria (Ö3 Austria Top 40)	74
South Korea (Gaon Chart)	37
US Billboard Hot 100	57
US Digital Songs (Billboard)	14
US Pop 100 (Billboard)	42

== Release history ==
Release dates and formats for "Confessions of a Broken Heart (Daughter to Father)"
Region	Date	Format	Label	Ref.
United States	October 18, 2005	Contemporary hit radio	Casablanca	
Australia	January 16, 2006	CD	Casablanca	
United Kingdom	February 28, 2006	CD	Casablanca	
Germany	March 10, 2006	CD	Casablanca	
