= Lindsay Lohan on screen and stage =

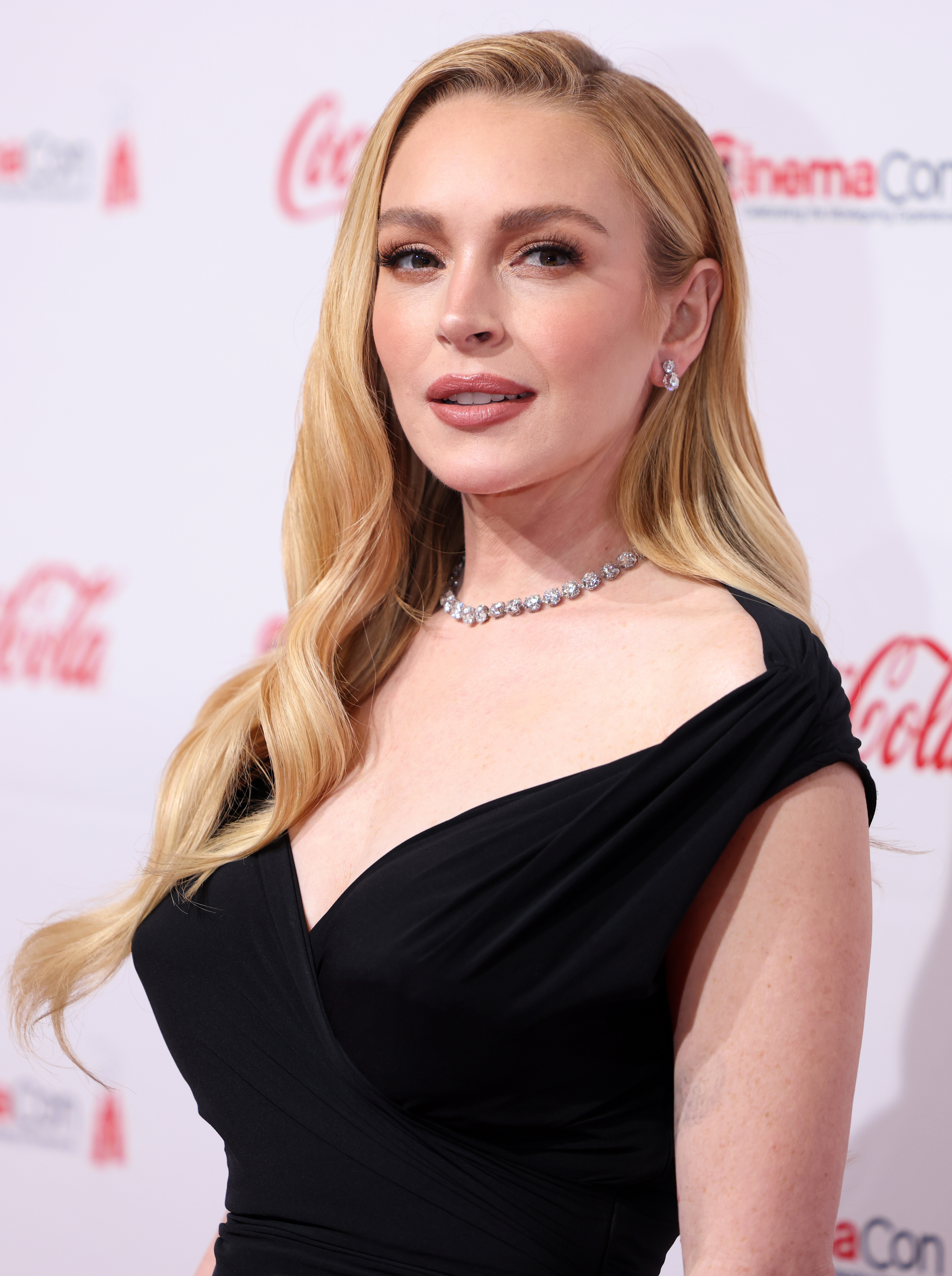
Lohan in 2025

American actress and singer Lindsay Lohan began her career as a child actress in the 1990s and has since appeared in numerous film and television projects among other productions. Lohan made her motion picture debut in Disney's commercially and critically successful remake of The Parent Trap (1998). She continued her acting career by appearing in a number of Disney films, including Freaky Friday (2003), which remains her highest-grossing film, Confessions of a Teenage Drama Queen (2004) and Herbie: Fully Loaded (2005). Her first non-Disney film, Mean Girls (2004), became a massive success by grossing over $129 million worldwide and later became a cult classic. Lohan also did smaller, more mature roles in which she received positive reviews on her acting including A Prairie Home Companion (2006), Bobby (2006) and Chapter 27 (2007). Between 2006 and 2007, Lohan continued her career with leading roles in films like Just My Luck (2006), Georgia Rule (2007) and I Know Who Killed Me (2007). Lohan's career faced many interruptions from legal and personal troubles during the mid to late 2000s, with her acting work becoming more sporadic in the following decade. She then starred in Labor Pains (2009), Machete (2010), Liz & Dick (2012) and The Canyons (2013). She made her stage debut in the London West End production of Speed-the-Plow (2014). In 2022, Lohan signed a multi-picture deal with Netflix to star in her first major productions in over a decade, the romantic comedies Falling for Christmas (2022), Irish Wish (2024), and Our Little Secret (2024). In 2025, Lohan made her return to Disney by reprising her role as Anna Coleman in the legacy sequel Freakier Friday. She is set to star in the upcoming limited series Count My Lies set for release in 2027.

== Film ==
Lindsay Lohan film appearances
Year	Title	Role	Notes	Ref.
1998	The Parent Trap	Hallie Parker / Annie James	Film debut; lead role	
2003	Freaky Friday	Anna Coleman / Tess Coleman	Lead role	
2004	Confessions of a Teenage Drama Queen	Mary Elizabeth "Lola" Cep	Lead role	
2004	Mean Girls	Cady Heron	Lead role	
2005	Herbie: Fully Loaded	Margaret "Maggie" Peyton	Lead role	
2005	My Scene Goes Hollywood: The Movie	Herself	Voice role; guest star	
2006	A Prairie Home Companion	Lola Johnson	Ensemble cast	
2006	Just My Luck	Ashley Albright	Lead role	
2006	Bobby	Diane Howser	Ensemble cast	
2006	Friendly Fire	The Girlfriend	Guest star	
2006	The Holiday	Herself	Uncredited cameo	
2007	Chapter 27	Jude Hanson	Supporting role	
2007	Georgia Rule	Rachel Wilcox	Lead role	
2007	I Know Who Killed Me	Aubrey Fleming / Dakota Moss	Lead role	
2009	Labor Pains	Thea Clayhill	Lead role	
2010	Machete	April Booth	Supporting role	
2011	Lindsay Lohan	Herself	Short film; lead role	
2012	First Point	Herself	Short film; lead role	
2013	Inappropriate Comedy	Herself	Cameo	
2013	Scary Movie 5	Herself	Cameo	
2013	The Canyons	Tara	Lead role; also co-producer	
2015	Till Human Voices Wake Us	Lana	Short film; guest star	
2019	Among the Shadows	Patricia Sherman	Supporting role	
2022	Falling for Christmas	Sierra Belmont / Sara	Lead role; also exec. producer	
2024	Mean Girls	Mathletes Moderator	Cameo	
2024	Irish Wish	Madeline "Maddie" Kelly	Lead role; also exec. producer	
2024	Our Little Secret	Avery Becker	Lead role; also exec. producer	
2025	Freakier Friday	Anna Coleman / Harper Coleman	Lead role; also exec. producer	
2027	Return to You †	Kim	Lead role; also producer	

Key
†	Denotes films that have not yet been released

== Television ==
Lindsay Lohan television appearances
Year	Title	Role	Network	Notes	Ref.
1992	Late Night with David Letterman	Trick-or-treater	NBC	Uncredited; episode dated October 29	
1993	Guiding Light	Chrissie	CBS	Episode dated May 24	
1994	Live with Regis and Kathie Lee	Herself	WABC-TV	Episode from 1994	
1994–1995	Sesame Street	Kid	PBS	2 episodes	
1996–1997	Another World	Alexandra "Alli" Fowler	NBC	Recurring role	
2000	Life-Size	Casey Stuart	ABC	Television film; lead role	
2000	Bette	Rose	CBS	Episode: "Pilot"	
2002	Get a Clue	Alexandra "Lexy" Gold	Disney Channel	Television film; lead role	
2003	Punk'd	Herself	MTV	Episode dated December 14	
2004	MTV Diary	Herself	MTV	Television documentary	
2004, 2005, 2006, 2012	Saturday Night Live	Herself; Various characters	NBC	5 episodes (Host of 4 episodes)	
2004	2004 MTV Movie Awards	Herself	MTV	Host	
2004	King of the Hill	Jenny Medina	Fox	Voice role; episode: "Talking Shop"	
2004	That '70s Show	Danielle	Fox	Guest star; episode: "Mother's Little Helper"	
2006	Rock Legends: Platinum Weird	Herself	VH1	Television mockumentary	
2006	2006 World Music Awards	Herself	Channel 4	Host	
2008	Ugly Betty	Kimmie Keegan	ABC	Recurring role; 4 episodes	
2009	Project Runway	Herself	Bravo	Guest judge; episode: "Welcome to Los Angeles!"	
2010	Teenage Paparazzo	Herself	HBO	Television documentary	
2010	Lindsay Lohan's Indian Journey	Herself	BBC Three	Television documentary	
2010	Double Exposure	Herself	Bravo	Episode: "I'm Gonna Smash the Ringflash!"	
2011	Love, Marilyn	Herself	HBO	Television documentary	
2012	Glee	Herself	Fox	Guest star; episode: "Nationals"	
2012	Liz & Dick	Elizabeth Taylor	Lifetime	Television film; lead role	
2013	Million Dollar Decorators	Herself	Bravo	Episode: "The Finishing Touch"	
2013	Anger Management	Herself	FX	Guest star; episode: "Charlie Gets Lindsay Lohan in Trouble"	
2013	Chelsea Lately	Herself	E!	Guest host; episode dated August 5	
2013	Oprah's Next Chapter	Herself	OWN	Episode: "Lindsay's Next Chapter"	
2013	Late Night with Jimmy Fallon	Stephanie Sullivan	NBC	Episode dated September 26	
2013	Eastbound & Down	Adult Shayna Powers	HBO	Uncredited cameo; episode: "Chapter 29"	
2014	Lindsay	Herself	OWN	Lead role; 8 episodes; also producer	
2014	Billy on the Street	Herself	Fuse	Episode: "Billy Destroys a Car"	
2014	2 Broke Girls	Claire Guinness	CBS	Guest star; episode: "And the Wedding Cake Cake Cake"	
2015	Jimmy Kimmel Live!	Sorta Guillermo	ABC	Episode dated February 3	
2017	Friday Night Feast	Herself	Channel 4	Episode: "Lindsay Lohan, Venison and Spear Fishing"	
2018	Sick Note	Katerina West	Sky One	Recurring role; 7 episodes	
2019	Lindsay Lohan's Beach Club	Herself	MTV	Lead role; 12 episodes; also producer	
2019	The Masked Singer Australia	Herself	Network 10	Panelist; 10 episodes	
2020	Haircut Night in America	Herself	CBS	Television special	
2020	Celebrity Watch Party	Herself	Fox	2 episodes	
2021	Devil May Care	Ziva	Syfy	Voice role; episode: "The Date"	
2022	Lovestruck High	Herself	Prime Video	Voice role; narrator; 8 episodes	
2025	The Simpsons	Maggie Simpson	Fox	Voice role; episode: "Parahormonal Activity"	
2027	Count My Lies †	Violet Lockhart	Hulu	Lead role; also exec. producer	

Key
†	Denotes television productions that have not yet been released

== Stage ==
Lindsay Lohan stage work
Year	Title	Role	Playwright	Venue	Notes	Ref.
2014	Speed-the-Plow	Karen	David Mamet	Playhouse Theatre	September 24 − November 30	

== Music videos ==
Lindsay Lohan in music videos
Year	Title	Performer	Director	Ref.
2003	"What I Like About You"	Lillix	Scott Marshall	
2004	"Drama Queen (That Girl)"	Herself	Declan Whitebloom	
2004	"Rumors"	Herself	Jake Nava	
2005	"Over"	Herself	Jake Nava	
2005	"First"	Herself	Jake Nava	
2005	"Confessions of a Broken Heart (Daughter to Father)"	Herself	Lindsay Lohan	
2008	"Everyone Nose"	N.E.R.D.	Diane Martel	
2011	"Let the Games Begin"	MIGGS	Justin Purser	
2012	"Blue"	R.E.M.	James Franco	
2013	"Applause" (V magazine version)	Lady Gaga	Cycy Sanders	
2013	"City of Angels"	Thirty Seconds to Mars	Jared Leto	
2023	"You Only Love Me"	Rita Ora	Charlie Sarsfield	

== Web ==
Lindsay Lohan web appearances
Year	Title	Publisher	Notes	Ref.
2009	Lindsay Lohan's eHarmony Profile	Funny or Die	Sketch	
2009	Lindsay's Private Party	Muse (88 Phases)	Short	
2010	Lindsay Lohan by Ellen von Unwerth	GQ Deutschland (Condé Nast)	Short	
2010	Cut & Sew	Marc Ecko	Campaign	
2010	Cameo Stars	Facebook	Cameos	
2010	Lindsay Lohan by Ellen von Unwerth	Vogue Italia (Condé Nast)	Short	
2010	Judd Apatow's All-Star Video Part 2	Funny or Die	Sketch	
2011	Life Is Not a Fairytale	Tyler Shields	Short	
2014	Operation Bobbi Bear	Life Ball	Charity auction	
2014	Love Advent	Love (Condé Nast)	Web series	
2015	Lindsay Lohan by Ellen von Unwerth	No Tofu	Short	
2020	The Parent Trap Reunion	Katie Couric Media	Virtual event	
2020	Mean Girls Reunion	Katie Couric Media	Virtual event	
2022	Life in Looks	Vogue (Condé Nast)	Web series	
2022	The Lohdown	Studio71	Podcast series	
2025	To The Nines	Vanity Fair (Condé Nast)	Web series	
2026	In The Bag	Vogue Arabia (Condé Nast)	Web series	

== Commercials ==
Lindsay Lohan in commercials
Year	Company/Brand	Promoting	Ref.
1990s	Duncan Hines	Food products	
1990s	Jell-O	Food products	
1990s	Pizza Hut	Food products	
1990s	Wendy's	Food products	
1990s	Gap	Clothing	
1990s	Pay Day	Board game	
1996	Allstate	Fire safety PSA	
2001	Walt Disney World	100 Years of Magic	
2004	MTV	MTV Movie Awards	
2005	NBA	Basketball league	
2006	Proactiv	Skin care products	
2009	Fornarina	Clothing	
2011	Beezid	Online retailer	
2015	Esurance	Insurance (Super Bowl XLIX)	
2018	Lawyer.com	Legal services	
2020	Discover	Credit card (Super Bowl LIV)	
2022	Planet Fitness	Fitness center (Super Bowl LVI)	
2022	Allbirds	Footwear	
2022	Pepsi	Soft drink beverage	
2023	Peter Thomas Roth	Skin care products	
2023	MCM x Crocs	Footwear	
2023	Walmart	Black Friday	
2024	Pure Leaf	Iced tea beverage	
2024	Nexxus	Hair care products	
2024	Netflix	Streaming service	
2025	Old Navy	Clothing	
2025	Schwarzkopf	Hair care products	
2025	Verizon	Telecom services	
2025	Dunkin'	Coffee beverage	
2025	Amazon	Amazon Alexa	
2025	Google	Google Shopping	
2026	Health-Ade Kombucha	Fermented tea beverage	
2026	Chime	Mobile banking	
2026	Reese's Oreo	Chocolate candy	
2026	Marshalls	Holiday retail	

== Other media ==
Lindsay Lohan in other media
Year	Title	Role	Type	Ref.
2000	Abbie, Girl Spy	Abbie Walker	Audiobook	
2014	Lindsay Lohan's Price of Fame	Herself	Video game	

== See also ==
- Lindsay Lohan discography
- List of awards and nominations received by Lindsay Lohan
