= Personal life of Lindsay Lohan =

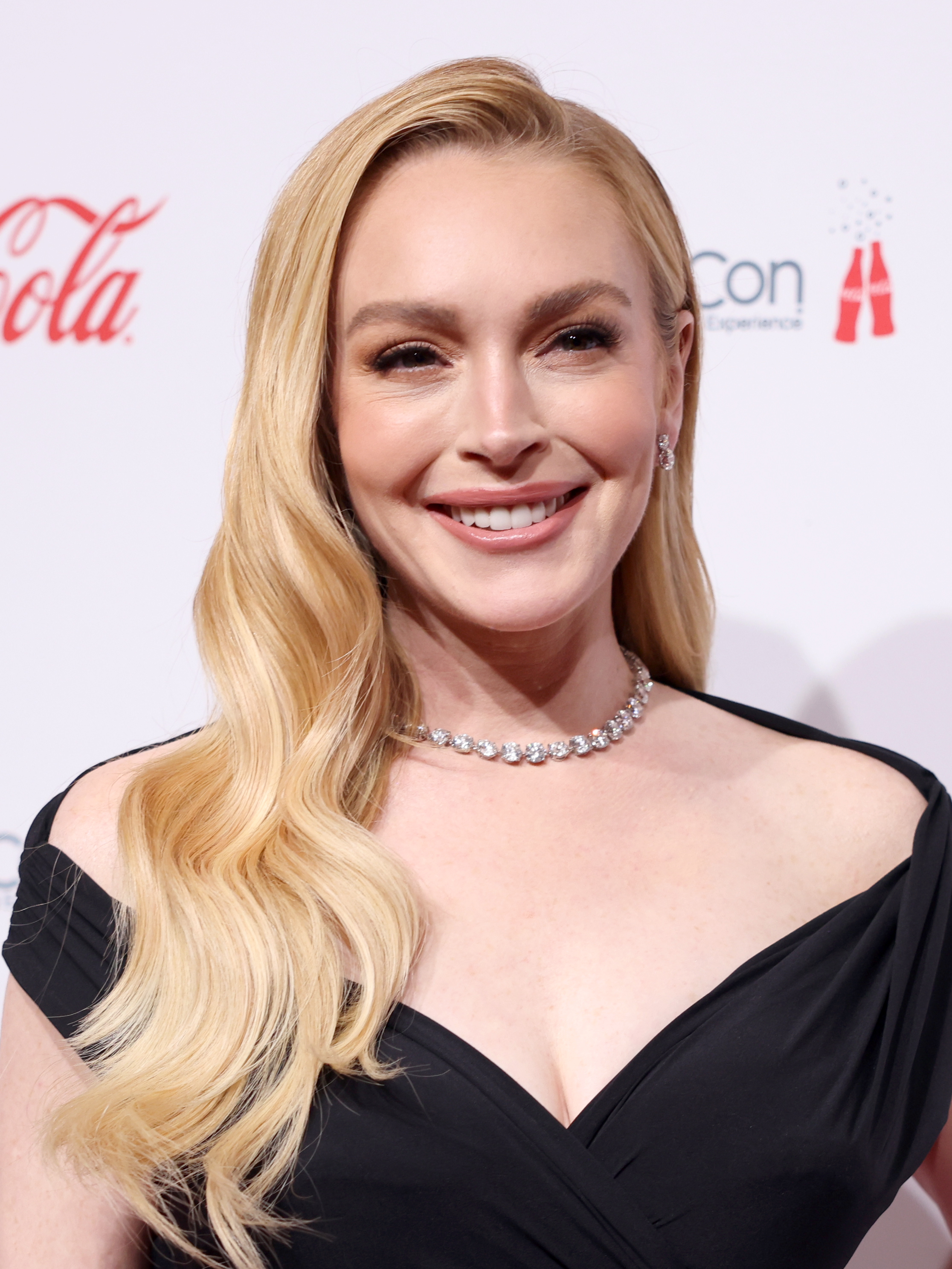
Lohan in 2025

American actress and singer Lindsay Lohan has led a high-profile life since her youth as a child model and actress. Following commercial success and critical recognition, Lohan secured her status as a teen idol and received extensive media attention. Starting in 2007, Lohan's life became plagued by legal issues and battles with addiction which led to career setbacks and near bankruptcy. Her legal problems continued until 2015, the first time she had been probation-free in over eight years. Alongside her legal problems and addiction issues, including her multiple court-mandated rehabilitation stints, her turbulent family life and personal relationships have also been highly publicized and documented.

== Early life ==
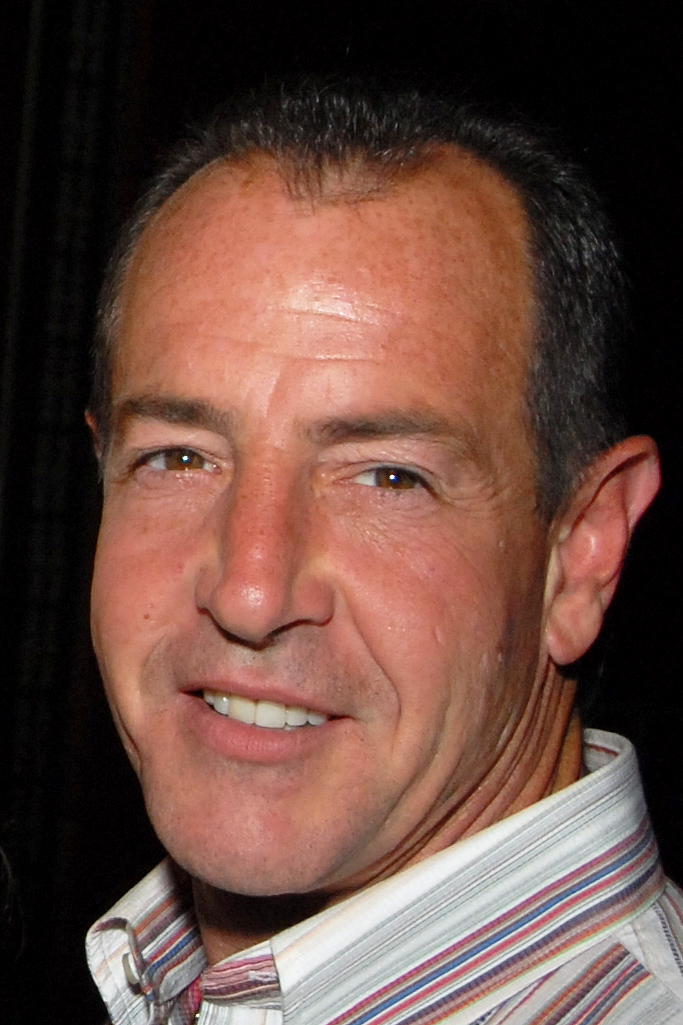
Michael Lohan

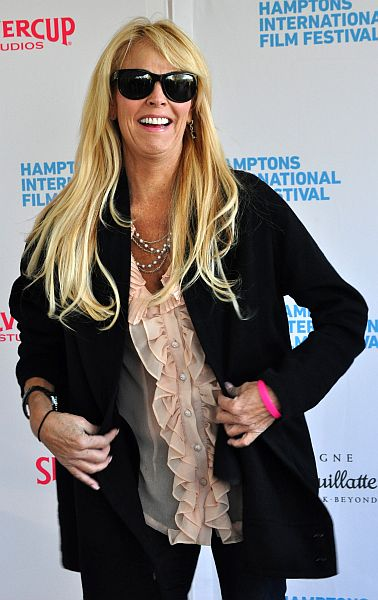
Dina Lohan

=== Family and childhood ===
Lohan's father, Michael, served jail time in a stock fraud case when Lohan was four years old, and has been arrested almost a dozen times. Lohan spoke about her turbulent childhood in 2007, the same year her parents finalized their divorce: "I feel like a second parent in the sense that I helped raise my family... I was put between my mother and father a lot." Despite the conflicts, Lohan spoke very fondly of her family. However, in 2007, 2008, and 2009 she admitted that she had cut off contact with her father, describing his behavior as unpredictable and hard to deal with.

After a fight with her mother, Dina, in 2012, Lohan had called her father in a frantic episode, insisting that her mother was on cocaine like "a crazy person", according to her. Her father evidently recorded the call and released it to the tabloids. The tape subsequently went viral and gained mass media attention. While filming the 2013 film, The Canyons, Lohan filmed a scene with co-star James Deen which depicted the actress being assaulted by Deen. It ended with Lohan sobbing on the ground. When later complimented on her acting in the scene she responded that, "I've got a lot of experience with that from my dad". By 2023, Lohan was on good terms with both of her parents as the family gathered in July, which reportedly marked the first time they were all together in at least seven years.

=== Teenage years ===
Lohan said that her first problems arose when she moved to California by herself at 17. In her interview with Oprah Winfrey in 2013, Lohan spoke of her lack of financial guidance and how her early legal problems left her unfazed as she was so deep into her tendencies as an addict. In the same interview, Lohan admitted it took a period of time before she could admit to herself that she had a problem.

Upon moving to Los Angeles, Lohan briefly lived with fellow Disney star Raven-Symoné, though Symoné said Lohan had been at the apartment very little, claiming she had only been there three times. Following Mean Girls, Lohan spent several years living out of hotels in Los Angeles, of which two years were spent at the Chateau Marmont. In late 2007, after settling down in a more permanent residence, she explained that she "didn't want to be alone" but that "it wasn't a way of life ... not very consistent." She had a series of car accidents that were widely reported, in August 2004, October 2005 and November 2006, when she suffered minor injuries because a paparazzi who were following her for a photograph hit her car. During her time working in Los Angeles, Lohan had suffered from bulimia nervosa.

== Personal interests ==
Lohan has mentioned her interest in writing an autobiography several times, stating in 2018 that she planned to release one in the near-future.

Lohan is fluent in French and able to understand Russian. She says she is studying Italian, Arabic, and Turkish.

=== Religion ===
Lohan was raised Catholic. In April 2016, Lohan was studying Islam and considered converting. Lohan was spotted publicly with a headscarf and holding a Quran, resulting in media coverage questioning her faith, although Lohan's family has denied that she has changed religions. Following an incident in an airport in February 2017 when Lohan was asked to take off her headscarf while going through security, she publicly claimed to have been "racially profiled". Moreover, she wrote "Salam Aleikum", a religious salutation among Muslims, in her Instagram biography.

In January 2019, Lohan said in an interview that she meditates three times a day.

== Residence ==
Lohan grew up on Long Island and moved to Los Angeles on her own at age 15. She briefly returned to New York in 2014 after checking out of rehab, and also lived in London after she signed on to do a stage play in the West End, Speed-the-Plow, and to escape the intense public attention she had been receiving while in the United States. She mentioned at the time: "I can go for a run here [London] on my own. … I do every morning, early, and I think how my friends in New York would still be up partying at that time. I needed to grow up, and London is a better place for me to do that than anywhere else", then she added, "I haven't heard myself mentioned on TV since I have been here. That has been really weird for me, and great".

After about a year in London, Lohan visited Dubai and decided to settle there, citing its privacy and calmer pace of life. She had also spent time in Mykonos, Greece, where she operated a beach club and filmed the reality television series Lindsay Lohan's Beach Club. Explaining her decision to live in Dubai, she said: "There's a certain calmness that I find there... There's no paparazzi, no cameras. That's a big deal for me."

== Social and political views ==
In October 2016 and January 2017, Lohan went to Turkey to visit the Syrian refugee camps, and to meet the Turkish President Recep Tayyip Erdoğan, and a Syrian refugee girl, Bana al-Abed.

In October 2017, Lohan received scrutiny for defending Harvey Weinstein, with whom she worked on several films, on Instagram and saying that his wife Georgina Chapman should stay with him. Weinstein had been accused of sexual harassment, sexual assault and rape. Lohan later clarified stating, "I am saddened to hear about the allegations against my former colleague Harvey Weinstein. As someone who has lived their life in the public eye, I feel that allegations should always be made to the authorities and not played out in the media."

In September 2018, Lohan garnered controversy and scrutiny after she livestreamed herself attempting to lead away a homeless woman's children on Instagram Live after they refused her help. In the video, she accuses the woman of child trafficking and dubs the family "Syrian refugee[s]" although no further clarification was provided on the incident.

=== Political interests ===
During the 2008 US presidential campaign, Lohan offered her services to Barack Obama's Democratic election effort, but was declined. In a blog post, Lohan criticized the media and then Republican vice presidential candidate Sarah Palin for not focusing on policy, and denounced Palin's positions on homosexuality, birth control and abortion. Lohan had previously expressed an interest in going to Iraq, during the Iraq War in 2006, on a USO tour with Hillary Clinton. In the 2012 presidential election, Lohan initially supported Republican candidate Mitt Romney, something that prompted ABC News to call her a "political turncoat". Less than two weeks later, she tweeted words supportive of Obama.

Following her criticism of several of the pressing matters involving Brexit, Lohan had gained support for her political views due to her unexpected attentiveness and passionate beliefs about the matter.

== Relationships ==
=== Friendships ===
Since the 2000s, Lohan has had a series of love-hate friendships with a few celebrities, dubbed by the media as her "frenemies", the most notable example being her relationship with socialite and reality television personality Paris Hilton. The duo repeatedly snubbed one another in the media but would eventually make amends until 2013, when Hilton's younger brother Barron accused Lohan of having club owner Ray LeMoine beat him up during the Art Basel festival in Miami, with Hilton quickly responding in his defense on social media. LeMoine would later clarify and state Lohan had been unconnected to the episode, and no charges were ever filed against him. Upon being asked about the incident on the 2014 docuseries Lindsay, Lohan distanced herself from the situation saying she "did not have any part in it." As of 2022, the two had reconciled and Hilton dismissed the feud as "very immature". Early in her teenage career, Lohan had a high-profile feud with fellow Disney star Hilary Duff, after both seemingly dated Aaron Carter around the same time. They were often brought up in each other's interviews, and Lohan parodied the feud while hosting a 2004 episode of Saturday Night Live. By early 2007, the conflict was over as the two were hanging out together and Lohan supported Duff's album release.

In 2013, her Confessions of a Teenage Drama Queen co-star Megan Fox mentioned Lohan when she commented on Marilyn Monroe, saying: "She [Monroe] wasn't powerful at the time. She was sort of like Lindsay. She was an actress who wasn't reliable, who almost wasn't insurable... She had all the potential in the world, and it was squandered". Fox later explained her comments: "I attempted to draw parallels between Lindsay and Marilyn in order to illustrate my point that while Marilyn may be an icon now, sadly she was not respected and taken seriously while she was still living", then she added, "I intended for this to be a factual comparison of two women with similar experiences in Hollywood. Unfortunately it turned into me offering up what is really much more of an uneducated opinion. It was most definitely not my intention to criticize or degrade Lindsay."

=== Romantic relationships ===
Lohan began dating actor Wilmer Valderrama in 2004. She also guest-starred in an episode of That '70s Show, where Valderrama was a regular. After their break up, Lohan wrote her song, "Over", about the experience. In 2006, she briefly dated Hard Rock Cafe heir Harry Morton, before dating model and son of Irish footballer George Best, Calum Best, whom she dated until 2007. The following year, Lohan began a relationship with DJ Samantha Ronson in 2008. She co-hosted club events with Ronson and accompanied her when she was DJing. In April 2009, following her break up with Ronson, Lohan appeared in a dating video spoof on the comedy website Funny or Die. It was viewed 2.7 million times in the first week and received favorable comments from the media. In 2016, it was revealed Lohan was engaged to London-based Russian business heir Egor Tarabasov after they had started dating in the previous year. The engagement was called off shortly after they were photographed in a physical altercation on a beach in Mykonos, and a video surfaced of Lohan accusing him of abuse in their London apartment in July 2016.

In 2021, Lohan announced her engagement to financier Bader Shammas after three years of dating, and they were wed in 2022. Bader Shammas is a Kuwaiti citizen and a member of the Shammas family, one of the twelve Kuwaiti Christian families. On July 2, 2022, a representative confirmed Lohan and Shammas were married after she called him her "husband" on her Instagram birthday post. In 2023 she gave birth to their son; Stephen Curry and Ayesha Curry are his godparents.

=== Sexuality ===
Speaking about her sexual orientation, Lohan said that she was not a lesbian. When asked if she was bisexual in 2008, she responded "Maybe. Yeah," adding, "I don't want to classify myself." However, in a 2013 interview, she said, "I know I'm straight. I have made out with girls before, and I had a relationship with a girl. But I think I needed to experience that and I think I was looking for something different."

== Substance use ==
By the age of 21, Lohan had become a prominent fixture of the Los Angeles late-night scene, where alcohol and other drugs were often present and on hand for her. By 2007, her lifestyle had "caught up" with her, she once noted, as she started to receive more attention for her late-night persona than for her film work, and faced the beginning of what would be a long series of run-ins with the law. She described herself as an "addict" in her 2014 interview with Oprah Winfrey, stating that alcohol was a gateway drug to other things for her. She also admitted to using cocaine "10 to 15 times", explaining that it "allowed [her] to drink more".

Her January 2007 admittance into a rehab center marked the first of six court-ordered rehab stints in a span of six years; she had spent over 250 days in rehabilitation by 2014. In January 2007, Lohan admitted herself to the Wonderland Center rehabilitation facility for a 30-day stay. In May, she entered the Promises Treatment Center rehabilitation facility where she stayed for 45 days. In July, she entered the Cirque Lodge Treatment Center in Sundance, Utah for a third stint at rehabilitation in the year, staying for three months until her discharge in October. In August 2010, Lohan entered an inpatient rehabilitation facility, from where she was released after only 23 days, and in October, she entered the Betty Ford Center, a drug and alcohol treatment center, where she remained on court order for three months until early January 2011. Between May and July 2013, Lohan spent 90 days in rehabilitation at the Cliffside Malibu treatment facility.

== Legal issues ==
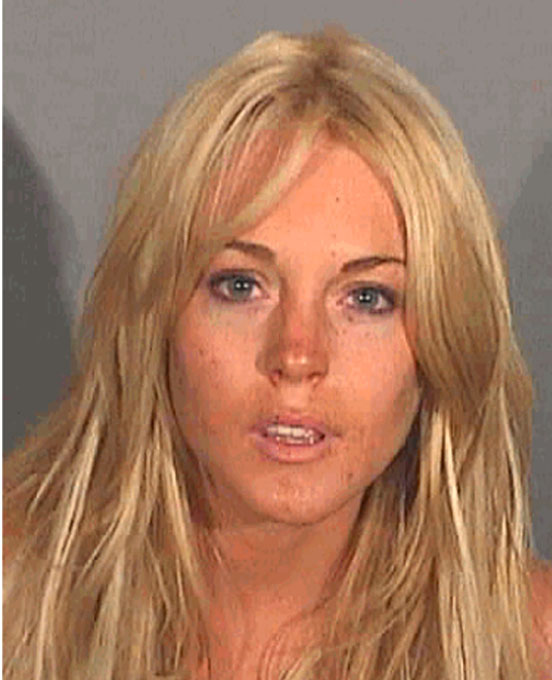
Lohan's July 2007 mugshot

In May 2007, Lohan was arrested on a charge of driving under the influence of alcohol (DUI). In July, less than two weeks out of rehab, Lohan was arrested a second time on charges of possession of cocaine, driving under the influence and driving with a suspended license. In August, Lohan pleaded guilty to misdemeanor cocaine use and driving under the influence and was sentenced to an alcohol education program, community service, one day in jail, and was given three years probation. Lohan released a statement in which she said "it is clear to me that my life has become completely unmanageable because I am addicted to alcohol and drugs." In November, Lohan served 84 minutes in jail. A sheriff spokesman cited overcrowding and the nonviolent nature of the crime as reasons for the reduced sentence.

In October 2009, Lohan's DUI probation was extended by an additional year, following several instances in which she failed to attend the court-ordered substance abuse treatment classes. In May 2010, Lohan traveled to the Cannes Film Festival to promote the biographical drama Inferno. She was set to star as the lead, adult-film performer Linda Lovelace, but was later replaced while in court-mandated rehab. Because she was in Cannes, Lohan missed a mandatory DUI progress hearing. A bench warrant was issued for her arrest which was rescinded after she posted bail. A judge determined that Lohan had violated the terms of her probation by missing several mandatory classes and meetings. She was sentenced to 90 days in jail, followed by 90 days of inpatient rehab treatment. However, Lohan served only 14 days of the jail sentence, due to overcrowding. Lohan served those 14 days in solitary confinement, purportedly to provide for her safety. Lohan later said that she had subconsciously wanted to go to jail amidst her struggles with addiction, in hopes of finding a place "to just sit" and "be at peace".

In September 2010, Lohan's probation was revoked following a failed drug test. She spent part of the day in jail before being released on bail. In February 2011, Lohan was charged with the theft of a necklace reported stolen from a jewelry store the month before. She was sentenced to community service and 120 days in jail for misdemeanor theft and probation violation, to which she pleaded no contest. Due to jail overcrowding, Lohan served the sentence under house confinement, wearing a tracking ankle monitor for 35 days. In November, Lohan was found to have violated the terms of her probation by failing to perform the required community service. She was sentenced to additional community service and 30 days in jail, of which she served less than 5 hours due to overcrowding.

On her way to the Liz & Dick set in June 2012, Lohan was in a car accident, where she sustained minor injuries and which caused a delay in production. In March 2013, Lohan pleaded no contest to misdemeanor charges of reckless driving and providing false information to a police officer that stemmed from the June 2012 car accident. She was sentenced to community service, psychotherapy and lockdown rehabilitation. Her probation was also extended until May 2015, when a judge ended it after she completed the community service.

In March 2023, Lohan and other celebrities were charged by the SEC for violating investor-protection laws by promoting a cryptocurrency on social media without properly disclosing that they were compensated for doing so. A representative stated Lohan was unaware of disclosure obligations and agreed to pay a fine to resolve the matter.

=== Bling Ring ===
In 2009, Lohan's home was burglarized by the Bling Ring, a group of fashion-motivated burglars whose ringleader considered Lohan to be their ultimate conquest. Video surveillance of the burglary recorded at Lohan's home played a large role in breaking the case. Even though by August 2009 Rachel Lee had moved into her father's place in Las Vegas, she felt compelled to return to California for yet another burglary, the target being Lohan, who was apparently Lee's "ultimate fashion icon" and "biggest conquest". On the 23rd, Lee, Nick Prugo, and Diana Tamayo allegedly stole around $130,000 worth of clothes and jewelry from Lohan's home in Hollywood Hills. According to Prugo, Tamayo and Lee were "freaking out" over Lohan's things. By that time, they were well-publicized criminals at large, and Prugo was especially worried about the burglary, knowing that if they were captured by surveillance cameras stealing from the star's home, the footage would be widely seen. Lohan was briefly incarcerated in a cell next to Alexis Neiers, a member of the Bling Ring.

The case was covered in the 2013 biopic The Bling Ring by Sofia Coppola. Archive footage in the film featured Lohan during the trials. Lohan referenced the burglars in the pilot of her own series, Lindsay (2014).
