= 6126 =

6126 may refer to:

- 6126 (clothing line), an American brand
- Nokia 6126, a 2006 mobile telephone
- ZD6126, a vascular-targeting agent and a prodrug of N-acetylcolchinol
- a year in the 7th millennium
