= Miggs =

Miggs may refer to:

- Miss Miggs, character in Barnaby Rudge
- Miggs (band)
- Miggs Cuaderno
