= Ulta Beauty =

American beauty store chain

Ulta Beauty, Inc.
- Formerly: Ulta Salon, Cosmetics & Fragrance Inc. (1990–2017)
- Type: Public
- Traded as: Nasdaq: ULTA; S&P 500 component
- Founded: 1990; 36 years ago (as Ulta Salon, Cosmetics & Fragrance, Inc.)
- Founders: Terry Hanson; Dick George
- Headquarters: Bolingbrook, Illinois, U.S.
- Number of locations: 1,591 (2026)
- Key people: Kecia Steelman (CEO)
- Revenue: ▲US$12.4 billion (2025)
- Operating income: ▼US$1.53 billion (2025)
- Net income: ▼US$1.15 billion (2025)
- Total assets: ▲US$7.0 billion (2025)
- Total equity: ▲US$2.80 billion (2025)
- Number of employees: 66,800 (2026)
- Subsidiaries: Space NK
- Website: ulta.com
- Footnotes; Financials as of February 1, 2025.

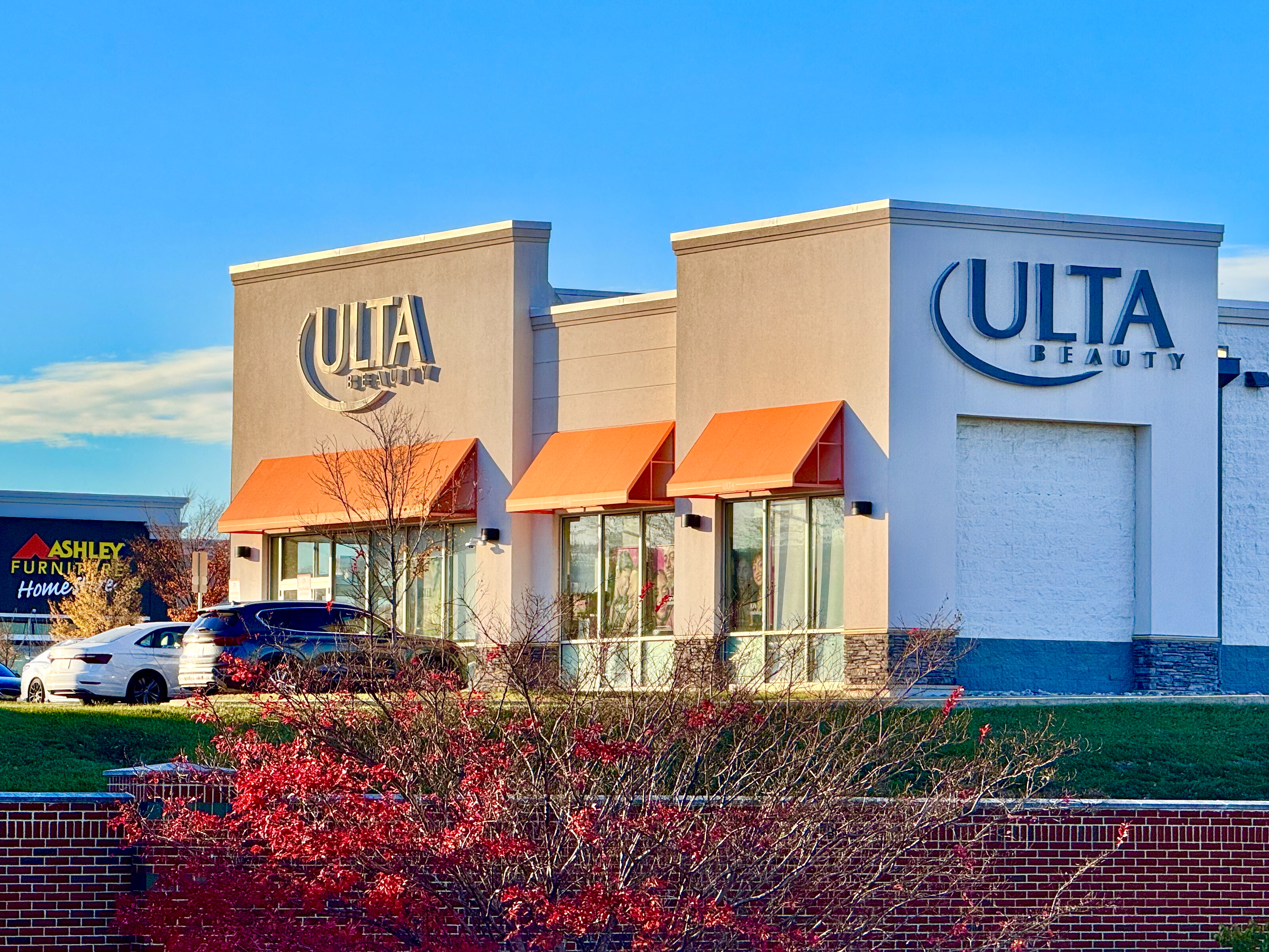
Ulta Beauty, Forestville, Maryland

Ulta Beauty Logo

Ulta Beauty, Inc., formerly known as Ulta Salon, Cosmetics & Fragrance Inc. and before 2000 as Ulta3, is an American chain of cosmetic stores headquartered in Bolingbrook, Illinois. Ulta Beauty carries both high- and low-end cosmetics, fragrances, nail products, bath and body products, beauty tools and haircare products. Nearly every Ulta Beauty store features a full-service salon.

== History ==
Ulta was founded by Richard E. George, the former president of Osco Drug, Inc., and Terry Hanson. George left Osco in 1989 to develop a business plan for a retailer that would offer beauty products at different price levels. Other Osco executives joined George and Hanson in the business and raised $11.5 million in venture capital. Founded in 1990, the company was initially called Ulta3 to suggest a third option for consumers to purchase beauty products, beyond a drugstore or department store.

Upon its launch, the brand opened five brick and mortar locations in the suburbs of Chicago. The name Ulta3 came from the idea to sell multiple types of beauty products in the same store. The first of the locations opened at High Point Centre in Lombard, Illinois in early October 1990. The name was changed from Ulta3 to Ulta at the end of 1999.

On October 25, 2007, the company became publicly traded on the NASDAQ. In 2008, Ulta opened a second distribution center in Phoenix, Arizona. In 2020, before the COVID-19 pandemic there were 44,000 employees. By 2021, Ulta employed approximately 37,000 people. In 2024, company employment rose to 58,000 employees.

=== Corporate governance ===
George left Ulta in 1995, and Hanson became the company's chief executive officer (CEO). In December 1999, Lyn Kirby became the president and CEO and Charles "Rick" Weber became senior executive vice president, chief operating officer (COO) and Chief Financial Officer (CFO).

In 2010, Carl "Chuck" Rubin was appointed as chief operating officer, president, and as a member of the board of directors. In July 2013, Mary Dillon was appointed as CEO and a member of the board of directors. Dillon was previously the chief of U.S. Cellular and a senior executive at McDonald's and PepsiCo.

In January 2025, Dave Kimbell announced his retirement as CEO of Ulta Beauty effective immediately. Dave Kimbell was succeeded as CEO by Kecia Steelman, who was previously the company’s chief operating officer. The same month, Amiee Bayer-Thomas was named chief retail officer.

In June 2025, Chris Lialios was appointed as chief financial officer (CFO). Also in June 2025, Lauren Brindley was named chief merchandising and digital officer.

== Locations ==
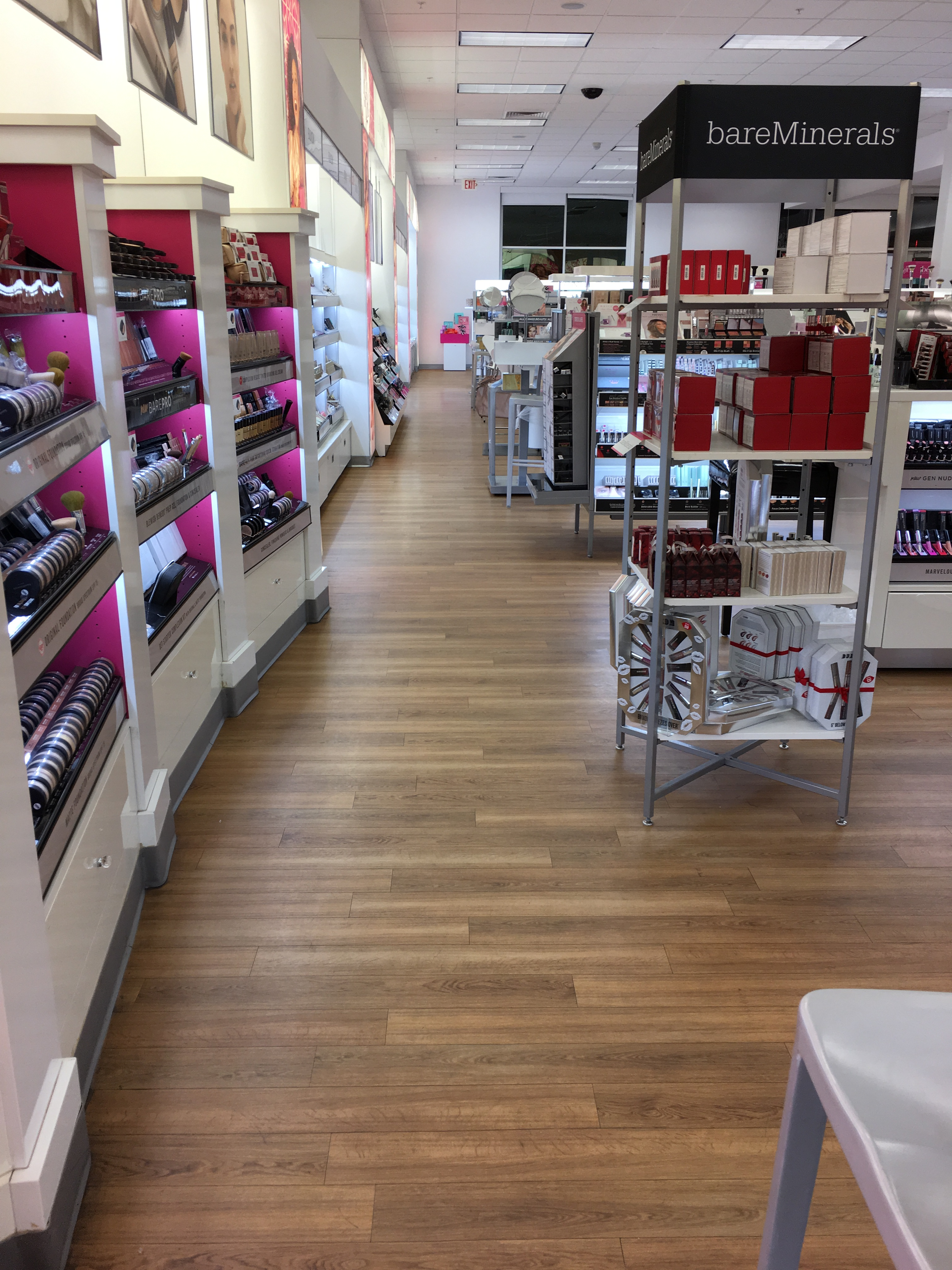
The inside of an Ulta store in Dublin, California, 2016

As of January 31, 2026, Ulta Beauty operated 1,591 stores worldwide, including 1,505 Ulta Beauty stores in the United States and 86 Space NK stores in the United Kingdom and Ireland. The company also expanded internationally through a joint venture in Mexico with Grupo Axo and a franchise partnership in the Middle East with Alshaya Group.

In 2025, Ulta Beauty launched their first store outside the United States, in The Avenues Mall, Kuwait. The company also announced their expansion into the Mexican market through a joint venture with the retail group Axo. This decision was part of the company's long-term growth strategy, following an evaluation that identified Mexico's beauty market as a sector with significant growth potential. The initial phase of this expansion included plans to open stores in Mexico City and Guadalajara, and aimed to introduce the brand to key urban centers.

== Operations ==
Ulta Beauty offers both high-end and drugstore cosmetics, skincare, and fragrances, in addition to its own brands of beauty products and fragrances. They sell brands such as MAC Cosmetics, Kylie Cosmetics, and ColourPop Cosmetics. Ulta Beauty sales were $713.8 million for the first quarter ending in May 2014. At the end of the second quarter ending in August 2014, Ulta Beauty reported that total sales increased by 22.2% and comparable store sales increased 9.8%. In 2019, Ulta had stores in 48 states. A majority of Ulta Beauty stores are located in the East Coast region and in California. The same year, Ulta joined the 15 Percent Pledge, which dedicated more store shelf space to Black-owned businesses. In 2020, Ulta Beauty announced a partnership with Credo Beauty to introduce a Credo-curated clean beauty collection in 100 Ulta stores and on Ulta.com.

In 2022, Ulta collaborated with Allure, bringing a collection of 25,000 products to Allure’s online and brick-and-mortar stores. The collaboration ran from July to September 2022 and included brands such as Fenty Beauty, Drybar, Olaplex, Tula, The Ordinary, Peter Thomas Roth, CosRX, NYX, Morphe, and Beekman 1802 selected by Ulta's merchandising team. In January 2024, Ulta Beauty began construction to move from their original distribution center in Romeoville, IL 888 to their new Bolingbrook, IL 871 building. It began operations in August 2024.

=== Target partnership ===
In August 2021, the retail chain Target started selling Ulta's products. By 2025, there were 600 Target locations selling Ulta products, 200 short of their mutual goal. Following the failure to meet projected goals, Ulta Beauty and Target Corporation formally announced that they were ending their partnership in August 2025. The two companies mutually agreed to not renew their agreement for the coming year, meaning the Ulta Beauty at Target experience would end in August 2026. Ulta Beauty products were still available in Target stores and online until the end of the agreement.
