= Credo Beauty =

American natural, organic and clean beauty retailer and spa

- Industry: Retail
- Products: Cosmetics
- Website: https://credobeauty.com/

Credo Beauty is an American specialty beauty retailer focused on products marketed as clean beauty. The company sells cosmetics, skin care, hair care, body care and fragrance products online and through physical retail stores. Credo has been covered for its role in the clean beauty retail market, its ingredient standards, and its policies on product packaging and single-use items.

== History ==
Credo Beauty was founded in 2014 by Annie Jackson and Shashi Batra, both former Sephora executives. The company opened its first store in San Francisco in 2015 and later expanded into e-commerce and additional retail locations in the United States.

In 2022, Credo acquired Follain, a Boston-based clean beauty retailer and product line. Vogue Business later described Follain as Credo's first acquisition.

== Retail model ==
Credo operates as a specialty retailer, carrying third-party beauty brands across categories including skin care, makeup, hair care, body care and fragrance. Fashionista described the company as a North American clean beauty retailer with more than 120 partner brands.The retailer has also partnered with larger beauty retailers; Vogue Business reported that Credo had entered a deal to roll out selected collections at Ulta Beauty.

== Clean beauty standards ==
Credo uses its own product standards to determine which products may be sold by the retailer. Its standards include restrictions on ingredients and requirements related to ingredient disclosure, sourcing, packaging and marketing claims.

The term "clean beauty" does not have a single regulated or agreed-upon definition, and beauty retailers have developed different standards for the products they classify as clean. Allure noted that retailers including Credo have created their own ingredient lists and standards in response to the lack of a common definition.

== Sustainability initiatives ==
Credo has adopted policies related to packaging and single-use beauty products. Vogue Business reported that the retailer moved to eliminate single-use plastic items, including certain sample packets, wipes and sheet masks, as part of a broader effort to reduce waste in beauty retail. The company has also published sustainable packaging guidelines for brands sold through its platform.

== See also ==
- Cosmetics
- Cosmeceutical
- Sustainability
- Greenwashing
- Beauty store
