= Mary Dillon (businesswoman) =

American businesswoman (born 1962)

- Born: 1962 (age 63–64); Chicago, Illinois
- Education: University of Illinois at Chicago
- Occupation: Businesswoman
- Board member of: Starbucks; Ulta Beauty

Mary Dillon (born 1962) is an American businesswoman and the former CEO of Foot Locker.

== Early life and education ==
Dillon was born and raised in Chicago, Illinois, the fourth of six siblings. Her father worked as a steelworker, while her mother was a housewife. Dillon studied college at the University of Illinois and worked various jobs, such as a waitress, a house cleaner, and a bank teller, to acquire money for her tuition. She earned her bachelor's degree in marketing in 1983.

== Career ==
Dillon was the CEO of Ulta Beauty, a beauty retail company, from July 2013 until June 2021, when she became chair. In May 2019, Dillon announced plans for Ulta to expand its business internationally, beginning with store openings in Canada.

Dillion was the CEO of Foot Locker from August 2022 until 2025 when she left the company.

Dillon was global chief marketing officer and executive vice president of McDonald's from 2005 to 2010. She was CEO and president of U.S. Cellular from 2010 to 2013.

Dillon is a member of The Business Council. She is a non-executive director of Starbucks.

Dillon was named one of Fortune's most powerful women in 2016. In 2016, she became a trustee of the Save the Children Federation. In October 2018, she was awarded the Sandra Taub Humanitarian Award for philanthropic leadership. In June 2019, Dillon was named one of the world's best CEOs by Barron's. She was named on Fortune's list of Most Powerful Women in 2023.
