= Kecia Steelman =

American business executive, president and CEO of Ulta Beauty

Kecia L. Steelman
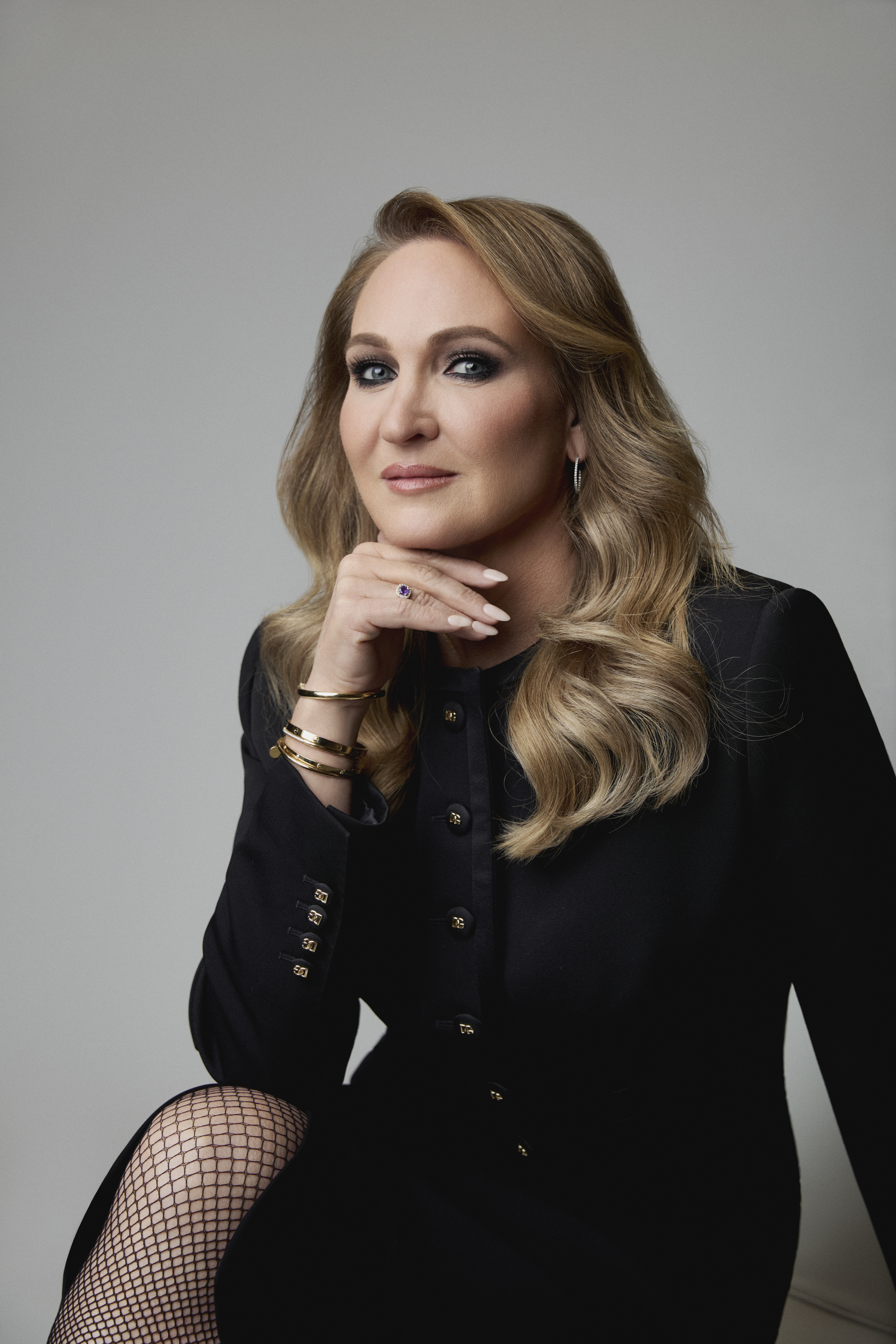
- Born: 1971 (age 54–55); Mediapolis, Iowa, United States
- Citizenship: American
- Occupation: Business executive
- Years active: 1993–present
- Employer: Ulta Beauty
- Title: President and Chief Executive Officer
- Board member of: Pinterest, Ulta Beauty, Breast Cancer Research Foundation, Adler Planetarium, Bay Clubs
- Spouse: Gray Steelman
- Children: 5
- Website: www.ulta.com

Kecia L. Steelman is an American business executive who has served as president and chief executive officer of Ulta Beauty since January 2025.

She previously held senior roles at Target Corporation, Home Depot and Family Dollar before joining Ulta Beauty in 2014, where she advanced through store operations leadership to chief operating officer (2021) and president and COO (2023).

== Early life ==
Steelman grew up in Mediapolis, Iowa. She obtained a bachelor’s degree in business management from Kennedy Western University.

== Career ==
Steelman began her career at Target Corporation in 1993, serving in retail operations and merchandising roles through 2005. She then joined The Home Depot as vice president and general manager for Expo Design Center, Home Depot Design Center and YardBIRDs, and later as director of new store innovations (2005–2009). From 2009 to 2014, she worked at Family Dollar in store development and operations leadership, becoming group vice president in 2011.

Steelman joined Ulta Beauty in July 2014 as senior vice president of store operations and was named chief store operations officer in September 2015. She became chief operating officer in June 2021 and president and COO in September 2023, overseeing corporate strategy, store and services operations, supply chain and international expansion efforts.

On 6 January 2025, Ulta Beauty announced that Steelman would succeed Dave Kimbell as president and CEO and join the company’s board of directors. As CEO, she has overseen Ulta Beauty’s international expansion, including the July 2025 acquisition of UK retailer Space NK. In August 2025, the company raised its annual sales and profit forecast after topping quarterly sales estimates, citing steady beauty demand and the UK expansion.

== Board service and other activities ==
Steelman serves on the board of directors of Pinterest, Ulta Beauty, the Breast Cancer Research Foundation, Bay Clubs - a KKR Portfolio Company, Retail Industry Leaders Association (RILA) and the Adler Planetarium and chaired its board (2023–2025). She is also a member of The Economic Club of Chicago.

== Recognition ==
- In September 2024, Steelman was recognized by WWD X FN X Beauty Inc. on their Women in Power List.
- In May 2025, Steelman was honored at the 47th annual Outstanding Mother Awards in New York City.
- In June 2025, Mass Market Retail (MMR) named Steelman as a 'Woman of Influence' for 2025.
- In October 2025, Steelman was included in Forbes' 50 Over 50 List.
- In October 2025, Steelman was named one of Fortune's 100 Most Powerful Women in Business.
- In November 2025, Steelman was recognized as a Top Leader in The Glossy 50 List.
- In February 2026, Steelman was named the recipient of CEW's Retail Leadership Award.
- In February 2026, Steelman was recognized as one of the TIME Women of the Year for 2026.
- In May 2026, Steelman was included on Fortune's 2026 Most Powerful Women List.

== Personal life ==
Kecia is married to her husband, Gray Steelman. Together, they have five children and three grandchildren.

== See also ==
- Ulta Beauty
- List of women CEOs of Fortune 500 companies
