= No Tofu =

Fashion magazine

NO TOFU Fall 2014 Cover

No Tofu is a luxury independent American print magazine on fashion, film, music, art, and culture. No Tofu is published in the US as a large-format, glossy quarterly.

== History ==
No Tofu started in 2007 as an online publication. At the time, No Tofu published reviews of independent films, as well as features on topics in music and film. The magazine launched a print edition in the spring of 2011.

In spring 2014, No Tofu relaunched as a large format quarterly with an issue with Shirley Manson of the band Garbage on the cover No Tofu features renowned and iconic personalities across the film, fashion, music and art spectra.

It has published features and interviews with Sarah Paulson, Lindsay Lohan, Rose McGowan, Michelle Monaghan, Mena Suvari, Pamela Anderson, Shirley Manson, Helene Yorke, Sharon van Etten, Joshua Oppenheimer, Gang Gang Dance, Cut Copy, Warpaint, Deerhoof, Yacht, ADULT., Perfect Pussy filmmakers Ira Sachs, Matt McCormick, Lee Krieger as well as artists Asger Carlsen, Patti Jordan and more.
