= Beezid =

- Type: Private
- Industry: E-Commerce
- Founded: June 6, 2008
- Founder: Max Bohbot
- Defunct: October 11, 2016
- Headquarters: Montreal, Quebec, Canada
- Area served: United States, Canada
- Products: Online Bidding Fee Auction with "Buy It Now" option & Store
- Number of employees: 50

Beezid was a Canadian online retailer and penny auction website located in Montreal, Quebec.

== History ==
Beezid CEO Max Bohbot had previously worked on developing other E-commerce websites, and decided on the bidding fee auction model after observing its success in the European market. Following nearly a year and a half of development, Beezid launched in October 2009. The company's name is a play on the word "bid," using a form of slang similar to izzle-speak.

On September 30, 2016 Beezid auction site was placed on standby. Beezid confirmed the site is no longer functional on October 11, 2016 on their Facebook page.

== Auctions ==
Beezid's auctions require the purchase of bids to participate. Members purchase bids in "Bid Packs," with the cost per bid ranging from $0.00125 - $0.90. Bid packs can be purchased in sizes ranging from 30 to 16,000,000 bids at a cost of $27 to $20,000.

Auctions open with several hours on the timer; each bid placed raises the auction price by a penny, and, in the final seconds, additionally resets the timer to a low value, to allow other members to bid. Placing a bid uses up a bid from the pool that a user had purchased, meaning that the cost of placing a bid is relative to the per bid price of the bid pack that you purchased. When the timer reaches 0, the auction closes and the last member to place a bid wins the item. Since there can only be one winner for each auction, participants can end up losing money while bidding without winning an item.

In October 2012, Beezid added a "Buy It Now" function to their auctions where, should a participant not win an auction, they can choose to pay the retail price for the item and have the bids that they used in the auction returned.

== Store ==
In November 2013, the Beezid Store opened as a retail extension of the penny auction site, offering the same merchandise found in their auctions that could be purchased directly rather than having to be won in a bidding fee auction. The Beezid Store additionally allowed the members to sell their auction wins from Beezid directly. Upon winning an item, a user could choose to sell the item instead of claiming it, and other website visitors could then purchase the items in the store.

== Critical reception ==
Beezid had drawn criticism of its business model for requiring the purchase of bids to participate, and for not disclosing the cost of bidding in their advertisements. Only one person could win any given auction, while the website profited from the bids spent by all the losing participants. Even the winner paid the cost in bids needed to win an item over and above the closing auction price.
