= Lindsay Lohan's Beach Club =

American reality television series

- Genre: Reality
- Presented by: Lindsay Lohan
- Starring: Lindsay Lohan; Panos Spentzos; Aristotle Polites; Billy Estevez; Brent Marks; Gabi Andrews; Jonitta Wallace; Jules Wilson; May Yassine; Mike Mulderrig; Sara Tariq; Alex Moffitt; Kailah Casillas; Kyle Marvé
- Opening theme: "Bossy" by Lindsay Lohan
- Country of origin: United States
- Original language: English
- No. of seasons: 1
- No. of episodes: 12

Production
- Executive producers: Gil Goldschein; Julie Pizzi; Farnaz Farjam; Andrea Metz; Lindsay Lohan; Benjamin Hurvitz; Jessica Zalkind; Lily Neumeyer
- Cinematography: "Ninja" Jason Williams
- Production company: Bunim/Murray Productions

Original release
- Network: MTV
- Release: January 8 – March 25, 2019

Lindsay Lohan's Beach Club is an American reality television series that aired from January 8 to March 25, 2019 on MTV, starring American actress and businesswoman, Lindsay Lohan. The series follows Lohan as she expands her business empire and manages her beach club in Mykonos, Greece, alongside her partner, Panos Spentzos. The show focuses on the lives of the staff at the club, who were flown from America for the summer, and competing to remain ambassadors for the Lohan brand.

The series received mixed reception, with most criticism focusing on Lohan's lack of screen time, which had been a deliberate decision by Lohan, as she disclosed during the promotional press tour for the series. In June 2019, it was reported that the show would not be returning for a second season.

== Background ==
In October 2016, Lohan opened her first nightclub, in collaboration with her business partner Dennis Papageorgiou, named Lohan Nightclub, in Athens, Greece. In May 2018, she launched Lohan Beach House Mykonos on the Greek island of Mykonos followed by her second beach club, Lohan Beach House Rhodes, on Ialysos Beach, Rhodes, In July 2018, it was revealed that Lohan and MTV were producing a "Vanderpump Rules-style" reality series set at Lohan Beach House Mykonos. Later that month, MTV released a first look at the series.

The diurnal club, located at the Kalo Livadi beach, was curated by Lohan after previously licensing her name to the Lohan brand, stating: "There's a business side to my life now, but I'm not in America, so no one knows about it, which is nice for me." "I really wanted to make it a family-style beach. A place where people can go with their kids and feel safe," she elaborated on the venture. She also recalled a highly publicized domestic abuse incident she suffered on a Mykonos beach as the catalyst for her decision to take over the space: "The last thing I was going to do was keep that memory [and] not make something better of it; so that's why I decided to take over the beach."

During an interview with The Times in August 2018, Lohan's partner in the Beach House business, Panagiotis Spentzos, stated her name was responsible for the brand's success in Europe and the Middle East. In early September 2018, a clip of Lohan dancing during production of the show recorded by a bystander and shared online went viral under the hashtag #DoTheLilo, inspiring replica dances, memes and fan art. Lohan explained she agreed to participate in the show because, unlike with her previous Lindsay docuseries, she would now be directing, "I'm the boss."

== Development and promotion ==
In December 2018, MTV announced that Lindsay Lohan's Beach Club would premiere in the United States on January 8, 2019, and roll out globally across Viacom's international network of MTV channels in nearly 180 countries. A trailer was released along with the show's premise which would allow viewers "to see a new side of Lohan as she calls the shots with her handpicked team of young and ambitious VIP hosts who will have to do whatever it takes to secure Lohan's name as the definition of vacation luxury."

A sneak peek of the series, titled "Lindsay Lohan: Welcome to the Beach Club, aired on January 1, 2019, on MTV, introducing the cast—who were flown in to work at the club from America for a summer, While talking about the show, Lohan said: "We were all very clear that it wasn't going to be a Lindsay Lohan follow-her-every-second kind of show. It was going to be me running a business. It's different because I'm writing the script, in a sense," continuing, "I have nothing to hide. What's left in saying that I've gone to a club? Now I own them." The cast attended a premiere party in New York City on January 7. A special titled "Growing Up Lohan" documenting Lohan's career and past MTV appearances, hosted by her siblings Aliana and Dakota, premiered on MTV on January 7, 2019. After the premiere episode, the network aired an after-show with Lohan and hosted by her Mean Girls co-star Jonathan Bennett.

Nina L. Diaz, MTV's president of programming and development, explained the show came about after a talent executive read that Lohan was opening the beach club in Mykonos and immediately brought it to MTV executives, "MTV called to find out if she'd consider and the response came back so positive. [...] That call happened in May and we were shooting by summer." Diaz stated that Lohan was heavily involved in the creative process of developing the series, "Twenty-four-seven, she wanted to know what was happening with them — if there was a conflict or issues — she wanted to be kept abreast and she would come down to the house to talk about something." Lohan, the beach club staff and production team, Bunim/Murray, were all living in villas next to each other during the filming throughout the summer of 2018.

=== Future ===
As of June 2019, Lohan had decided to sell the property to cash in on her investment and the beach club in Mykonos was closed. MTV had reportedly been "trying to make something work" for a second season, but Lohan was not interested at the time. Cast member Mike Mulderrig would later reveal in an interview that the series had a five season deal, and filming for the second season was set to start in the summer of 2019. However, those plans were scrapped after Lohan's decision to sell the club. The beach club was relocated to Alimos for the 2019 summer season under the name Lohan Seaside, closer to Lohan Nightclub in Athens so they could alternate seasonally, as a message on its official website informed. In a statement to Newsday, Lohan said: "The show was moving into a new direction. Perhaps not enough drama in my life for [a] reality-TV formula (as that's not where I am in my life). As for the club, we are simply moving the focus to a brand-new and exciting location in Athens, and also a new location and partnership to be announced in Mykonos."

Lohan Seaside was later featured on the twelfth season of The Real Housewives of Atlanta, with Panos Spentzos making an appearance. In April 2020, when Lohan was asked about the status of the series and her clubs, she replied: "When we did that show it was really good to tie in with the opening of the beach, we still have two [clubs] in Athens and we've been discussing what's gonna go on in Mykonos... now is not really the time to talk about it [due to COVID-19]. But we'll see, I still do have my Lohan clubs, and I still do want to open more [...] so there's all that in discussion." The Lohan Beach House Mykonos reopened for the 2020 summer season on July 1, 2020, according to its official website and social media activity, while respecting COVID-19 prevention measures.

== Cast ==
- Lindsay Lohan
- Panos Spentzos

=== Ambassadors ===
- Aristotle Polites
- Billy Estevez
- Brent Marks
- Gabi Andrews
- Jonitta Wallace
- Jules Wilson
- May Yassine
- Mike Mulderrig
- Sara Tariq
- Alex Moffitt
- Kailah Casillas
- Kyle Marvé

=== Cast duration ===
Ambassadors	Episodes											
Ambassadors	1	2	3	4	5	6	7	8	9	10	11	12
Alex												
Aristotle												
Billy												
Brent												
Gabi												
Jonitta												
Jules												
Kailah												
Kyle												
May												
Mike												
Sara												

Table Key
= Ambassador arrives
= Ambassador is featured in this episode
= Ambassador is fired
= Ambassador is re-hired
= Ambassador is selected to officially join the Lohan brand

== Episodes ==
No.	Title	Original release date	U.S. viewers (millions)
1	"Paradise Boss"	January 8, 2019	0.53
Lindsay and Panos welcome the prospective VIP hosts to Lohan Beach House, but as they get to work, Lindsay has apprehensions about some of their intentions.
2	"What Are Your Intentions?"	January 15, 2019	0.47
Lindsay wants to know what the hosts' intentions are in working for her, Aristotle goes above and beyond for a VIP client, and Brent finds himself in hot water.
3	"Lohan Rules"	January 22, 2019	0.44
The VIP hosts welcome Alesso to Lohan Beach House, Brent tries to win Sara back, and the arrival of a new ambassador shakes up the house.
4	"Lindsay Steps In"	January 29, 2019	0.51
Lindsay and Panos must intervene when a night out for the VIP hosts ends with an altercation, and Alex's sexual frustration could lead to trouble back home.
5	"Lindsay's Choice"	February 4, 2019	0.43
Lindsay makes a decision about Jonitta and Gabi's altercation, an argument erupts over an ambassador's cleaning habits, and the arrival of two new VIP hosts causes friction.
6	"Crossing Lindsay"	February 11, 2019	0.39
Alex takes time off to visit his family, and when the VIP hosts are tasked with going out to promote the beach club, Lindsay is furious when she finds them partying instead.
7	"Lindsay Flips the Script"	February 18, 2019	0.42
Anxiety spreads as everyone worries about their own positions with the brand after Lindsay sends shockwaves through the house by sending one of the hosts home.
8	"Do the LiLo"	February 25, 2019	0.34
Lindsay's frustrations with one of the hosts reaches a breaking point during a surprise visit, and Mike's insecurities surface as he plans the beach house's Pride celebration.
9	"Love, Loss, and Lohan"	March 4, 2019	0.31
Mike turns to Lindsay's longtime friend Nico Tortorella to discuss sexual fluidity, and the VIP hosts use a full moon ceremony to express their growing animosity toward Brent.
10	"I Would Rather Be Anywhere But Here Right Now"	March 11, 2019	0.33
Lindsay tries to boost morale by sending everyone out on a yacht for the day, Brent has a meltdown after Sara gets close to Billy, and Panos drops a bomb on the VIP hosts.
11	"Mike Takes it Too Far"	March 18, 2019	0.42
A night out threatens Billy's future with Sara, and Mike crosses the line when he tries to accommodate Lohan Beach House guests Nathan and Sophie from Geordie Shore.
12	"Lindsay's Final Four"	March 25, 2019	0.41
Mike faces the consequences for getting naked on the beach, Brent's gesture of goodwill leads to a fight with Kyle, and Lindsay winnows down the remaining hosts.

=== Specials ===
Title	Original release date
"Lindsay Lohan: Welcome to the Beach Club"	January 1, 2019
MTV gives viewers an intro to the cast and the series premise: "Lohan's handpicked team of young and hungry VIP Hosts will assist and do whatever it takes."
"Growing Up Lohan"	January 7, 2019
Lindsay Lohan's sister Aliana and brother Dakota look back at her most memorable TV appearances through the years, including award shows, music videos and her many visits to Total Request Live.
"After the Show"	January 8, 2019
Lindsay sits down with Jonathan Bennett to discuss her first reaction to the VIP hosts, play a game of Fact or Fiction and Hired or Fired, and answer questions from fans. Panos Spentzos and Lohan's brother Michael also appear.
"After the Show"	February 25, 2019
In front of a live studio audience of super fans, hosts Nessa Diab and Jenni "JWoww" Farley sit down with the cast of Lindsay Lohan's Beach Club to break down the drama of the most recent episode.

== Reception ==
=== Ratings ===
Lindsay Lohan's Beach Club's premiere ranked as one of the top five new cable shows of the 2018–19 season among young adults and was considered "another win for MTV" by Billboard. According to Nielsen, the launch delivered triple digit growth across MTV's key demos. MTV also saw substantial increases for the series viewership with delayed viewing.

Viewership and ratings per episode of Lindsay Lohan's Beach Club
No.	Title	Air date	Rating (18–49)	Viewers (millions)	DVR viewers (millions)	Total viewers (millions)
1	"Paradise Boss"	January 8, 2019	0.3	0.53	0.47	1.00
2	"What Are Your Intentions?"	January 15, 2019	0.3	0.47	0.43	0.90
3	"Lohan Rules"	January 22, 2019	0.2	0.44	0.40	0.84
4	"Lindsay Steps In"	January 29, 2019	0.3	0.51	0.45	0.95
5	"Lindsay's Choice"	February 4, 2019	0.3	0.43	—N/a	—N/a
6	"Crossing Lindsay"	February 11, 2019	0.2	0.39	0.50	0.90
7	"Lindsay Flips the Script"	February 18, 2019	0.2	0.42	0.44	0.86
8	"Do the LiLo"	February 25, 2019	0.2	0.34	0.42	0.76
9	"Love, Loss, and Lohan"	March 4, 2019	0.2	0.31	0.45	0.76
10	"I Would Rather Be Anywhere But Here Right Now"	March 11, 2019	0.2	0.33	0.43	0.76
11	"Mike Takes it Too Far"	March 18, 2019	0.2	0.42	0.44	0.86
12	"Lindsay's Final Four"	March 25, 2019	0.2	0.41	0.37	0.78

=== Critical response ===
On the review aggregator website Rotten Tomatoes, the series has an approval rating of 27% based on 15 reviews, with an average rating of 4.5/10. The website's critical consensus reads, "Lindsay Lohan's Beach Club lacks the trashy joie de vivre of similar reality shows largely due to the titular character's lack of screen time". Metacritic, which uses a weighted average, assigned a score of 45 out of 100 based on 6 critics, indicating "mixed or average reviews". Daniel D'Addario of Variety stated that the "new MTV reality series Lindsay Lohan’s Beach Club is an accidental success" as the focus on the lives of the staff "falls flat" but, "as a psychological portrait of the paparazzi magnet-turned-aspiring hospitality magnate Lohan, it’s juicily riveting." Writing for The Hollywood Reporter, Robyn Bahr claimed the series is "visually ugly, with the fuzzy camera unable to capture the lusciousness of the seaside or the tranquility of Mediterranean architecture". However, she acknowledged "Lohan, at least, comes off as emotionally intelligent with her staff, her deep, flinty voice and confident HBIC aura a welcome break from the participants' acrid attention-seeking".

Willa Paskin of Slate considered the series "halfhearted" stating that Lohan tried to star in a reality TV show "without touching the thing with a 10-foot pole," she continued, "Lohan is the series' title character, but she is not the protagonist. [...] The most interesting thing about Beach House is the extent to which Lohan's tabloid past is treated as though it were actually a reality show, the equivalent of Lisa Vanderpump's Real Housewives." Verne Gay from Newsday also described it as "the Real Housewives meets Temptation Island" with an "unexpected, and welcome, twist — Lohan is more or less the mature presence." The Daily Beast's Amy Zimmerman commented it's "great on paper, but in practice, the show faces a number of insurmountable obstacles that make it almost unwatchable," echoing most critics displeasure with the lack of focus on Lohan, "First and foremost: This Lindsay Lohan show is barely about Lindsay Lohan. [...] Without its supposed star, all that remains is a reality TV show that barely bothers to have a premise." Decider's Lea Palmieri said: "Watching [Lohan] in a position of authority, while it's the others that hustle and grovel around her, feels triumphant," concluding, "Many will write off Lindsay Lohan's Beach Club as trashy reality show, and others will wisely accept and appreciate it for that fact."

=== Accolades ===
Year	Award	Category	Result
2019	MTV Movie & TV Awards	Best Meme-able Moment	Nominated
2019	MTV Millennial Awards Brazil	Best Comeback	Nominated
2019	National Film & TV Awards	Best Reality TV Show	Nominated
