= Miggs (band) =

American pop/rock band

MIGGS is an American pop/rock band formed in 2001 in San Francisco, California, United States, by Don Miggs (vocals/guitar). Michael Lombardo (bass/vocals) joined in 2005, Walker Adams (drums/vocals) joined in 2011 and John Luzzi (guitar/vocals) joined in 2012. Over the course of a decade, the band has released five albums and toured extensively with Maroon 5, Stone Temple Pilots and Velvet Revolver's Scott Weiland, LIVE's Ed Kowalczyk, Plain White T's, Green River Ordinance, Parachute, Candlebox, and KT Tunstall.

== History ==
Don Miggs teamed up with drummer Jason Gianni and bass guitarist Mark Baker in San Francisco, California in 2001. After playing with many guitarists, the band independently released the album Anyway in 2003 which was recorded for less than $2,000 over the course of 50 hours. Michael Muller, who works and performs on the Late Show with David Letterman, played all lead guitar parts on the album. The band sold over 10,000 copies of Anyway and spent the next three years playing throughout California. At this time, MIGGS started to develop a fan base playing at local Borders and Barnes & Noble bookstores two to four times a week.

Gavin MacKillop (Goo Goo Dolls, Toad the Wet Sprocket, Sugarcult) teamed up with Miggs to produce Insomnia in 2005. The band embarked on their first national tour, opening for Cake (band), Aerosmith, Kid Rock and Lifehouse.

After a brief hiatus, Don Miggs released the solo acoustic EP, "Late Nights And Early Mornings".

2006 saw a reformed MIGGS with Don Miggs' childhood friend and original bassist Michael Lombardo joining the band. In 2008, the band released Unraveled, a collection of unreleased and alternate versions of songs from Miggs' previous three albums. They achieved chart success with the singles "Perfect" produced and mixed by JC Convertino, "I Believe," which reached No. 66 and No. 82 on Billboard's Hot AC chart. "I Believe" landed No. 7 on the Hot AC Media Base Chart and the band played on the national morning show Good Morning America.

2010 saw the release of MIGGS first album of new music in five years with Wide Awake. Wide Awake was produced by Ken Lewis and included the single "Girls & Boys," which hit the Billboard's Adult Album Alternative Chart at No. 42 and No. 89 on the Billboard's Hot AC chart. The music video for "Girls and Boys" was directed by Justin Purser. The next single off "Wide Awake" was "Let The Games Begin", which was also directed by Justin Purser and starred Lindsay Lohan. In the video, Lohan plays herself, partaking in celebrity activities by day and posing as an anonymous graffiti artist who paints the city walls of Los Angeles at night. The video landed the band major media attention from MTV Networks, Access Hollywood and many others.

In late 2011, MIGGS worked with the record producer Phil Ramone to record their fifth album, 15th & Hope. The album was released on September 11, 2012 on Elm City Music/EMI and entered the Billboard 200 at 163 and Heatseekers chart at number 7.

In June 2015, MIGGS released a rock single "Ordinary" that garnered attention of radio stations across the country with plays on Sirius XM station Octane and iHeart Radio's SIXX Pick, as well as hitting number 40 on the Billboard Mainstream Rock Songs chart. The long awaited self-titles album, Miggs, was released in 2020.

During the Covid-19 pandemic the original members of the band worked on new music during quarantine. The result was the early 2021 released single " Harder Than It Has To Be".

The band is currently on hiatus as all members work on other projects and ventures.

== Band members ==
- Don Miggs - Vocals/Guitar - 2001–present
- John Luzzi - Guitar/Vocals - 2012–present
- Michael Lombardo - Bass/Vocals - 2006–present
- Walker Adams - Drums/Vocals - 2011–present

== Previous members ==
- Michael Muller - guitar (2001–2002)
- Micah Beverly - guitar (2002–2004)
- John Carta - guitar (2004–2005)
- Sep Velizadeh - guitar (2006)
- Monroe Grisman - guitar (2007)
- Jason Gianni - drums (2001–2006)
- Brian Totten - drums (2007–2009)
- Ryan Scarborough - drums (2009–2010)
- Mark Baker - bass (2001–2005)

== Discography ==
=== Studio albums ===
Year	Album details
2002	Anyway: Label: SelfishMEmusic
2005	Insomnia: Label: 33rd Street Records
2008	Unraveled: Label: Rock Ridge Music
2010	Wide Awake: Label: Rock Ridge Music
2012	15th & Hope: Label: Elm City Music/EMI
2020	Miggs: Label: Miggs/EMI

=== Extended plays ===
Year	Album details
2016	MIGGS - EP: Label: Elm City
2007	Late Nights & Early Mornings - EP: Label: SelfishMEmusic
