= 6126 (clothing line) =

American clothing line

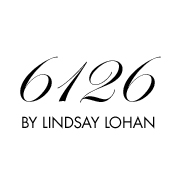
- Type: Subsidiary
- Industry: Fashion
- Founded: 2008
- Founder: Lindsay Lohan; Kristi Kaylor
- Defunct: 2011
- Headquarters: New York City, United States

6126 was a clothing line created by American actress and singer Lindsay Lohan, in collaboration with Kristi Kaylor. The line started with leggings before expanding to a full clothing collection. The name of the line represents the June 1, 1926 birthdate of American actress and model Marilyn Monroe, whom Lohan has said she admires and has been influenced by. The line is now defunct.

In January 2010, Kaylor revealed the line earned sales of US$3 million each year just for the leggings collection alone since its inception in July 2008.

== History ==
The line originated in July 2008 with leggings. Each type of legging was part of a legging brand within the collection. Leggings brands included Fame, Lust, Star, and others. Co-founder Kristi Kaylor said Lohan was involved in the process of designing, choosing the fabrics, trims, and buttons for the leggings: "She approves everything, down to invitations for events."

6126 donated all the sales from its Fame leggings collection to the Save the Children Fund to benefit the victims of the 2010 Haiti earthquake.

The line expanded from leggings to a full clothing collection in May 2010, with ready-to-wear including dresses, leather jackets, blazers, coats, mini [skirts] and pencil skirts, blouses, and corsets. The fashion press reported in April 2010 that the line would include a collection of handbags, shoes, and cosmetics for its Spring 2011 edition.

== Retail ==
6126 was sold in the better contemporary market segment in top stores such as Barneys, Neiman Marcus, Bloomingdale's, Nordstrom, Henri Bendel, Macy's, Saks Fifth Avenue, and Dash. The leggings collection was released on July 10, 2008 at Fred Segal and for online order on the website Intuition.

== Lawsuit ==
Photographer Scott Nathan sued Universal Music Group when he discovered that a photograph he shot of Lohan was used as the cover for her 2008 single "Bossy" without his permission. He also sued and prevailed over 6126's parent company after being promised a 1% interest in the clothing line for photographing Lohan in the leggings. The two settled, but Nathan then claimed 6126 or Lohan hadn't paid him according to the settlement.
