= Lindsay Lohan's Indian Journey =

2010 British documentary film

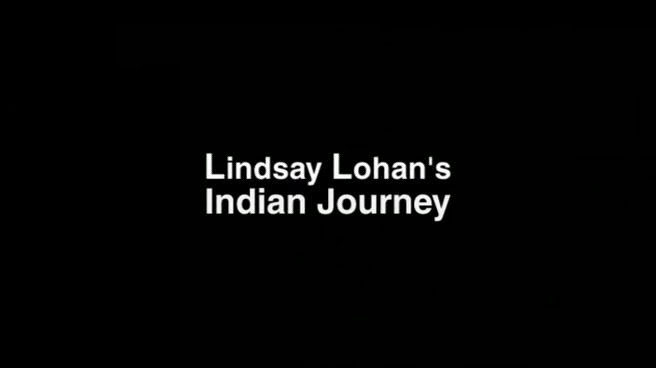
- Title card
- Directed by: Maninderpal Sahota
- Starring: Lindsay Lohan
- Narrated by: Lindsay Lohan
- Countries of origin: India; United Kingdom
- Original language: English

Production
- Producer: Maninderpal Sahota
- Cinematography: Petra Graf
- Editor: Jane Greenwood
- Running time: 57 minutes
- Production company: Blakeway Productions

Original release
- Network: BBC Three
- Release: 1 April 2010

Lindsay Lohan's Indian Journey is a 2010 British documentary film directed and produced by Maninderpal Sahota. It is presented and narrated by American actress Lindsay Lohan. In the hour long documentary, Lohan talks to victims of human trafficking in Delhi, Kolkata and a village in West Bengal. She also talks to a former trafficker, parents of trafficked children and visits the Sanlaap women's and children's shelter in Kolkata. The documentary was filmed in India over a period of a week in December 2009. Lohan became involved in the project after meeting Sahota at a social event and expressing an interest in participating.

Lindsay Lohan's Indian Journey received extensive negative media coverage since its inception. The BBC were heavily criticized for hiring Lohan despite her then recent widely publicized drunk-driving conviction and "party lifestyle". BBC said they chose Lohan to attract an audience that might otherwise not watch. Indian non-governmental organization, Bachpan Bachao Andolan, criticized Lohan for a Twitter post where she appeared to take credit for one of their raids, something BBC said was a misinterpretation. The media coverage did not translate to high ratings. In its original broadcast on BBC Three on 1 April 2010, it was viewed by 224,000 households, a 0.9% share of the audience. Critics complimented the documentary for being well researched and compelling, but found Lohan's presence to be odd and distracting.

== Synopsis ==
In Lindsay Lohan's Indian Journey, Lohan meets and interviews victims of human trafficking in Delhi, Kolkata and a village in West Bengal. They talk about the exploitation and abuse they have experienced, describing sexual slavery, physical abuse and difficulties in bringing their traffickers to justice. She also talks to a former trafficker and parents of trafficked children. One trafficked boy says that he can not go back home because his mother is ill. A mother who trafficked her daughter describes how her family did not have enough food, and how even though they never received the promised payments for her daughter's work, at least she was fed.

Lohan visits the Sanlaap centre, a women's and children's shelter in Kolkata. The centre offers dance therapy as part of their treatment and a group of girls perform a dance they have rehearsed. She talks to girls who had been held at a brothel and they describe being raped and drugged. The director of the Sanlaap centre describes how Lohan taking an interest in trafficking might inspire other young people to get involved in counteracting exploitation. Bharti Ali, director of the Non-governmental organization Centre for Child Rights, criticizes the government for not prioritizing child protection. Returning home, Lohan and the film crew are chased by paparazzi photographers at the airport. Two months later, Lohan is in London, England talking to Kate Redman, from Save the Children UK, who describes how one of the issues with government intervention is that only sex and drug trafficking is illegal. She also advocates raising awareness of the issues with trafficking.

== Production ==
Finding a celebrity who genuinely cares about the issue really helps pull in a crowd that wouldn't otherwise switch on. But you have to be careful. If you get a rent-a-celeb, this audience can spot it a mile off. I've turned down more celebrity-led documentaries than I've put on the channel.

— Danny Cohen on why Lohan was chosen to present the documentary.

Lohan spent a week in December 2009 in India filming Lindsay Lohan's Indian Journey with a BBC crew consisting of four people. Lohan became involved in the documentary after meeting Sahota at a social event and expressing her interest in doing it. Sahota stated that he was under the impression that Lohan chose to participate in the documentary "as a result of working in an adult world since she was ten, she feels childhood is precious, and when you lose one you can never replace those years". He also stated that the people they met in rural India were not previously familiar with Lohan.

On the second day of filming the documentary, Lohan posted a message on her Twitter account stating: "Over 40 children saved so far... Within one day's work". Indian non-governmental organization, Bachpan Bachao Andolan, said she had not been part of the raid mentioned and threatened legal action over the post. BBC said Lohan was "misinterpreted" and that "she was merely referring to a raid that happened connected to child trafficking". A few days later Lohan posted again on Twitter praising the work of Bachpan Bachao Andolan. She was originally scheduled to be present for the raid, but due to rescheduling arrived in the country too late. Lohan had also been scheduled to interview a representative for UNICEF for the documentary, but failed to show up. The BBC failed to ensure that Lohan had a proper work visa, which might lead to her being added to an immigration blacklist in India. Of her experience working on the film, Lohan said: "[t]he strength of the young boys and girls I met has been truly humbling" and "I hope my presence in India will bring awareness to the really important issues raised in making this film".

== Reception ==
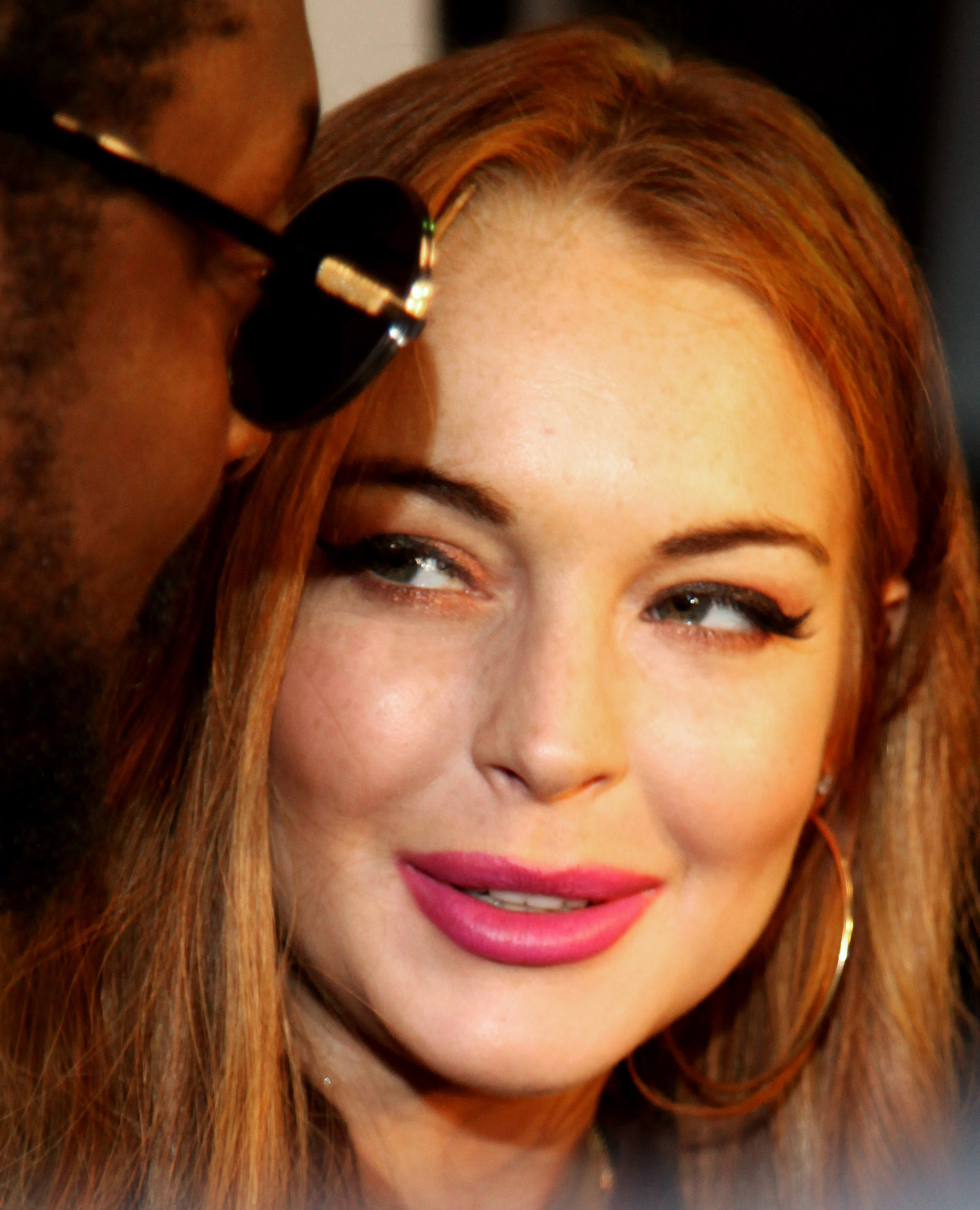
The BBC were highly criticized for hiring the actress to present the documentary

According to John Plunkett of The Guardian: "Few BBC3 programmes have generated quite so much media attention in such a short space of time. But the controversy generated by Lindsay Lohan's Indian Journey ... was not quite matched by its ratings". In its original broadcast on BBC Three on Thursday, 1 April 2010, the documentary was viewed by 224,000 households. It had a 0.9% share of the audience between 9pm and 10pm.

Critics complimented Lindsay Lohan's Indian Journey for being well researched and compelling, but they also found Lohan's presence to be odd. In her Lost in Showbiz column in The Guardian, Marina Hyde repeatedly criticized the documentary, in particular the choice to include Lohan, since its inception. She mentions Lohan's then recent conviction for "drink-driving and drug possession", describing her as a "trainwreck star" with a "[career] ... in foreclosure" and goes on to question if BBC was doing "image-laundering services" and whether the decision to hire Lohan was "symptomatic of a wider cultural malaise". Salon.com's Mary Elizabeth Williams likewise criticized BBC3's decision to have Lohan, whom she called a "disaster-prone starlet", front the programme, though she also said that "an effort that raises awareness of a global epidemic – even one that employs a crazy hot chick – is still an effort."

Amelia Gentleman of The Guardian described Lohan as "better known for what is euphemistically termed a party lifestyle" and said that while her participation did bring publicity to the project, the attention was uniformly negative and about her person, not the issues. Of the documentary she said that "the material is potent and persuasive", but that Lohan was a "constant, distracting presence". Sam Wollaston of The Guardian wrote a satirical, mocking letter ostensibly from the point of view of Lohan: "Some of these kids are sent to work when they're so young. Which I can relate to because I started out working as a child model aged three, and got into movies when I was 11. I can, like, so totally understand where these people are coming from".

Andrew Billen of The Times described the documentary as "a crash-course sentimental education" and "a rush job". He said that rather than highlight the crime of trafficking, "the spotlight was effectively turned on Lohan and under it she wilted". In a review in The Times, Caitlin Moran wrote that the juxtaposition of Lohan with the human suffering of trafficking made for "an odd, disconcerting programme". Alice-Azania Jarvis of The Independent found the documentary "very well put-together, very thoroughly researched, and very compelling" and she said that the inclusion of Lohan was "definitely not a terrible choice. Just a very, very odd one."
