= Peter Thomas Roth =

Hungarian-American businessman (born 1957)

- Roth with his mother (2023)
- Born: August 29, 1957 (age 69); New York City
- Occupation: Businessman
- Spouse: Noreen Anne Donovan (married-1996-2015)
- Parent(s): Carole Roth (née Szántó) and József Roth

Peter Thomas Roth (born August 29, 1957) is a Hungarian-American businessman.

== Life and career ==
Roth was born August 29, 1957, in New York City to Joska and Carole Roth. His mother is a Holocaust survivor. The Jewish Roth family operated spas in Békéscsaba and Mezőkövesd in the 19th and 20th centuries.

Roth founded a skincare brand in 1993, inspired by Hungarian hot springs.

== Personal life ==
Roth married interior designer Noreen Anne Donovan at the Plaza Hotel in 1996. They have two children, Ryan and Brendan.
