= Lindsay Lohan =

American actress and singer (born 1986)

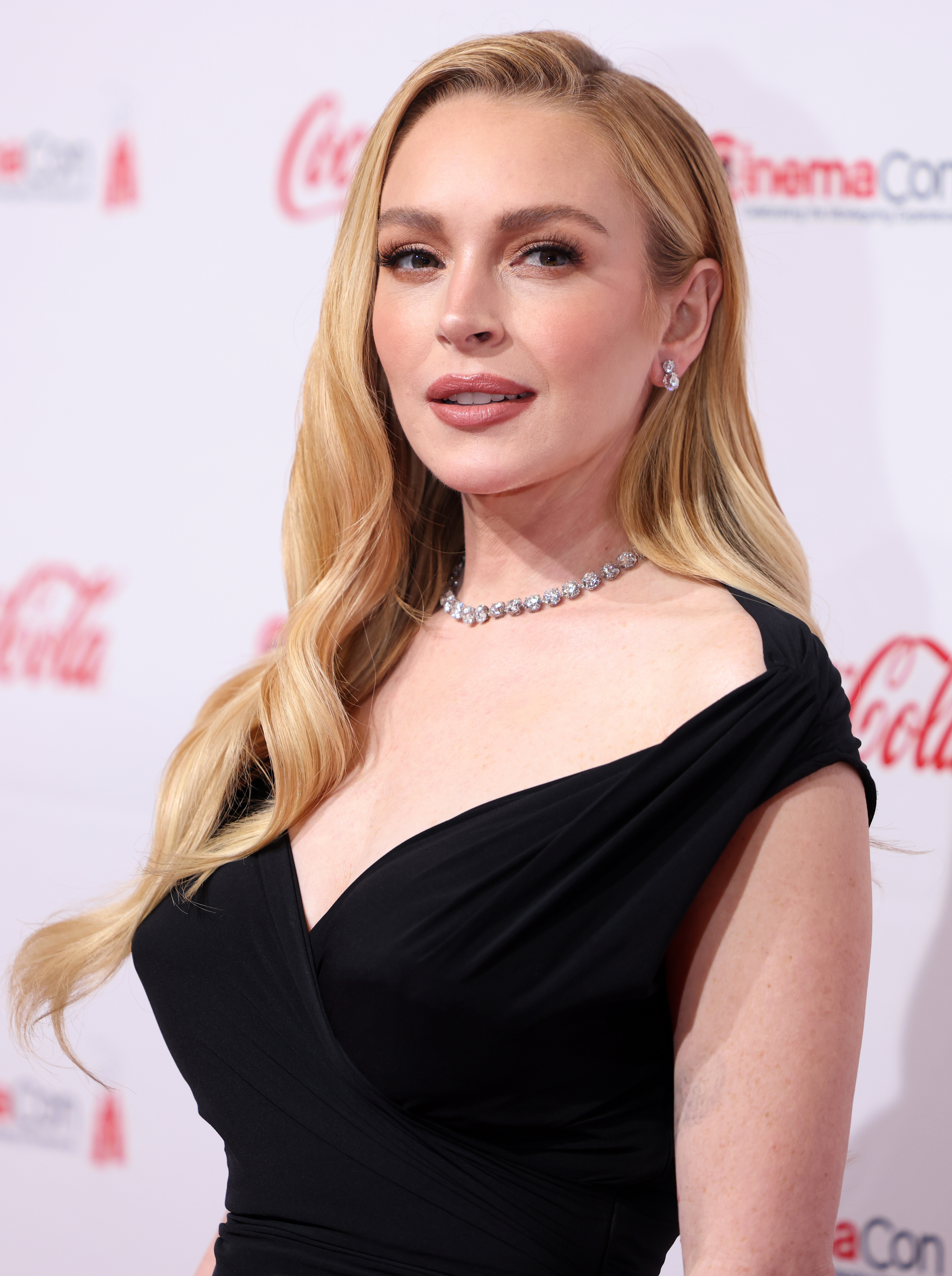
- Lohan in 2025
- Born: Lindsay Dee Lohan; July 2, 1986 (age 40); New York City, U.S.
- Occupations: Actress; singer; songwriter
- Years active: 1989–present
- Works: Performances; discography
- Spouse: Bader Shammas (m. 2022)
- Children: 1
- Parents: Michael Lohan; Dina Lohan
- Relatives: Aliana Lohan (sister)
- Awards: Full list
- Musical career
- Genres: Pop; pop rock
- Instrument: Vocals
- Labels: Casablanca; Universal Motown; Republic
- Website: lindsaylohan.com

Lindsay Dee Lohan (/ˈloʊ.ən/ LOH-ən; (Note: Commonly pronounced by others as /ˈloʊhæn/ LOH-han) born July 2, 1986) is an American actress, singer, and producer. She was signed to Ford Models at the age of three, and gained early recognition as a child actress on the soap operas Guiding Light (1993) and Another World (1996–1997). Her breakthrough role came with the dual role of reunited identical twins in the Walt Disney comedy The Parent Trap (1998); its success led to subsequent roles in Life-Size (2000), Get a Clue (2002), Freaky Friday (2003) and Confessions of a Teenage Drama Queen (2004). Her portrayal of Cady Heron in the teen comedy Mean Girls (2004) affirmed her status as a teen idol and established her as a prominent leading lady; The New Yorker later ranked it as the eleventh-best film performance of the 21st century.

Lohan signed with Casablanca Records and released two studio albums, the platinum-certified Speak (2004) and gold-certified A Little More Personal (Raw) (2005). She also starred in the comedies Herbie: Fully Loaded (2005) and Just My Luck (2006). To show her range, Lohan began choosing roles in independent films such as A Prairie Home Companion and Bobby (both 2006) and Chapter 27 (2007). Her behavior during the filming of the 2006 dramedy Georgia Rule marked the beginning of personal struggles that plagued her life and career for nearly a decade, making her a fixture in the tabloid press due to legal issues and rehabilitation stints. In an attempt to return to acting, she appeared in Machete (2010), Liz & Dick (2012) and The Canyons (2013).

Guided by Oprah Winfrey, Lohan was the subject of the docu-series Lindsay (2014). She made her stage debut in the London West End production of Speed-the-Plow (2014), and appeared in the comedy series Sick Note (2018). Lohan starred in the Netflix romantic comedies Falling for Christmas (2022), Irish Wish (2024) and Our Little Secret (2024), which she followed with Freakier Friday (2025).

Lohan's accolades include three MTV Movie & TV Awards, in addition to nominations for three Critics' Choice Movie Awards, a Saturn Award, and a Screen Actors Guild Award. Outside entertainment, Lohan launched a clothing line in 2008, and several clubs in Greece between 2016 and 2018. She appeared on Forbes' annual Celebrity 100 list from 2004 to 2005. People has named her among the most beautiful women in the world four times, most recently in 2024. In 2007, Maxim ranked her number one on their annual ranking of the world's most desirable women. Lohan is married and has one son.

== Early life ==
Lindsay Dee Lohan was born on July 2, 1986, in the Bronx, one of the five boroughs of New York City, and grew up in Merrick and Cold Spring Harbor on Long Island, New York. She is the eldest child of Dina (née Sullivan) and Michael Lohan. Her father, a former Wall Street trader, has been in trouble with the law on several occasions. Her mother is a former singer and dancer. Lohan has three younger siblings, all of whom have been models or actors: Michael Jr., who appeared with her in The Parent Trap in 1998, Aliana, known as "Ali", and Dakota "Cody" Lohan. The siblings are of Irish and Italian heritage, and were raised Catholic. Their maternal antecedents were "well known Irish Catholic stalwarts", and their great-grandfather, John L. Sullivan, was a co-founder of the Pro-life Party on Long Island. She began home-schooling in grade 11. Lohan's parents married in 1985, separated when she was three, and later reunited. They separated again in 2005 and finalized their divorce in 2007.

== Career ==
=== Early career and breakthrough (1989–2002) ===
Lohan began her career as a child model with Ford Models at the age of three. She modeled for Calvin Klein Kids and Abercrombie, and appeared in over 60 television commercials for brands like Pizza Hut and Wendy's, as well as a Jell-O spot with Bill Cosby. One her first roles was playing Chrissie in a 1993 episode of the television soap opera Guiding Light. By the age of 10, when Lohan played Alexandra "Alli" Fowler in the soap opera Another World, Soap Opera Magazine said she was already considered a show-business veteran.

Lohan remained in her role on Another World for a year, before leaving to star in Disney's 1998 family comedy The Parent Trap, a remake of the 1961 movie. She played the dual roles of twins, separated in infancy, who try to reunite their long-divorced parents, played by Dennis Quaid and Natasha Richardson. The film earned $92 million worldwide and received largely positive reviews. Lohan received unanimous acclaim for her debut performance. Critic Kenneth Turan called Lohan "the soul of this film as much as Hayley Mills was of the original", going on to say that "she is more adept than her predecessor at creating two distinct personalities." The film won Lohan a Young Artist Award for best performance in a feature film as well as a three-film contract with Disney. At the age of 14, Lohan played Bette Midler's daughter in the pilot episode of the short-lived series Bette, but she resigned her role when the production moved from New York to Los Angeles. Lohan starred in two made-for-TV movies: Life-Size alongside Tyra Banks in 2000, and Get a Clue in 2002. Emilio Estefan and his wife, Gloria Estefan, signed Lohan to a five-album production deal in September 2002.

=== Rise to prominence (2003–2005) ===
In 2003, Lohan starred alongside Jamie Lee Curtis in the remake of Disney's family comedy Freaky Friday, playing a mother and daughter who switch bodies and have to take on each other's roles. At Lohan's initiative, her character was rewritten and changed from a Goth style to be more mainstream. Her performance was met with significant praise. Critic Roger Ebert wrote that Lohan "has that Jodie Foster sort of seriousness and intent focus beneath her teenage persona." Freaky Friday earned Lohan the award for Breakthrough Performance at the 2004 MTV Movie Awards and, as of 2015, it remained her most commercially successful film, earning $160 million worldwide as well as an 87 percent approval rating on Rotten Tomatoes. Her role required her to learn how to play the guitar and to sing. She recorded a song for the film, "Ultimate", which was released to Radio Disney to help promote the film.

In 2004, Lohan had lead roles in two major motion pictures. The first film, Disney's teen comedy Confessions of a Teenage Drama Queen, earned a domestic box office total of $29 million, with Brandon Gray of Box Office Mojo commenting that it was "well above expectations as it was strictly for young girls." But the film was not met with critical acclaim. Robert K. Elder of the Chicago Tribune wrote that "though still a promising star, Lohan will have to do a little penance before she's forgiven for Confessions." Her second lead role that year, in the teen comedy Mean Girls, marked Lohan's first movie independent of Disney. The film was a critical and commercial success, grossing $129 million worldwide and, according to Brandon Gray, "cementing her status as the new teen movie queen." Mick LaSalle from the San Francisco Chronicle wrote that "Lohan is sensitive and appealing, a solid locus for audience sympathy." David Rooney from Variety said that "Lohan displays plenty of charm, verve and deft comic timing." Lohan received four awards at the 2004 Teen Choice Awards for Freaky Friday and Mean Girls, including Breakout Movie Star. Mean Girls also earned her two awards at the 2005 MTV Movie Awards. In 2021, The New Yorker critic Richard Brody placed Lohan's performance in Mean Girls at number eleven in his list of "The Best Movie Performances of the Century So Far".

With Mean Girls, Lohan's public profile was raised significantly. Vanity Fair described how she became a household name. Paparazzi began following her, and her love life and partying became frequent targets of gossip sites and the tabloid media, later becoming the basis of her debut single "Rumors". Following the film, which was scripted by former Saturday Night Live writer-actress Tina Fey and featured several Saturday Night Live performers, Lohan hosted the show three times between 2004 and 2006. In 2004, when Lohan was 17, she became the youngest host of the MTV Movie Awards.

Lohan's debut album, Speak, was released in the United States on December 7, 2004. The album was the first high-seller from Casablanca Records in several years, selling 1 million units in the United States. The album received mostly negative reviews, with critics commenting that Lohan "isn't a bad singer, but not an extraordinary singer either." In the United States, the album peaked at number four on the Billboard 200, selling 261,762 copies in its first week. In Germany the album debuted at number 53 and took four weeks to complete its chart run. The first two singles from Speak, "Rumors" and "Over", were both successes, with "Over" topping the Bubbling Under Hot 100 Singles, where it stayed for three weeks. The song also did well internationally in countries such as Australia, Ireland, and the United Kingdom. "Rumors" peaked at number six on the Bubbling Under Hot 100 chart and also did well in Australia and Germany, where it reached number 14. The music video for "Rumors" was nominated for Best Pop Video at the 2005 MTV Video Music Awards. Both songs received heavy airplay on MTV's Total Request Live.

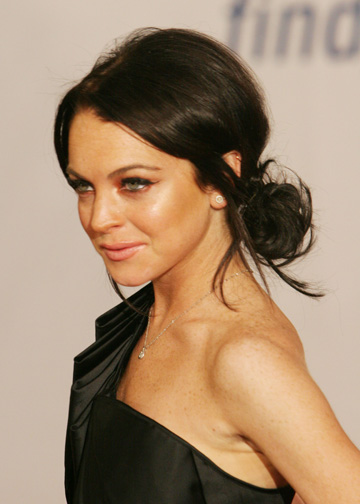
Lohan attending a fashion show in 2006

Lohan returned to Disney in 2005, starring in the comedy Herbie: Fully Loaded, the fifth film in the series with the anthropomorphic Volkswagen Beetle Herbie; she played a college graduate who finds Herbie, the living car, at a junk yard. The film earned $144 million worldwide, but it received mixed reviews. Stephen Holden of The New York Times called Lohan "a genuine star who ... seems completely at home on the screen", while James Berardinelli wrote that "as bright a starlet as she may be, Lohan ends up playing second fiddle to the car." In 2005, Lohan became the first person to have a My Scene celebrity doll released by Mattel. She also voiced herself in the animated direct-to-DVD film My Scene Goes Hollywood: The Movie, based on the series of dolls.

Lohan's second album, A Little More Personal (Raw), was released in December 2005. It peaked at number 20 on the Billboard 200 chart, and was eventually certified Gold. Lohan co-wrote most of the songs on the album, which received a mixed critical response. Slant Magazine called it "contrived ... for all the so-called weighty subject matter, there's not much meat on these bones." Lohan herself directed the music video for the album's only single, "Confessions of a Broken Heart (Daughter to Father)", which features her sister Aliana. The video is a dramatization of the pain Lohan said her family suffered at the hands of her father. It was her first song to chart on the Billboard Hot 100, peaking at number 57.

=== Career setbacks and limited work (2006–2013) ===
Lohan's next widely released film, the romantic comedy Just My Luck, opened in May 2006 and, according to Variety, earned her more than $7 million. The opening weekend box office takings of $5.7 million "broke lead actress Lindsay Lohan's winning streak" according to Brandon Gray. The film received poor reviews and earned Lohan her first Golden Raspberry nomination for Worst Actress. Following Just My Luck, Lohan focused on smaller roles in more mature, independent movies. Robert Altman's ensemble comedy A Prairie Home Companion, based on humorist Garrison Keillor's works, in which Lohan co-stars with Meryl Streep and Lily Tomlin, had a limited release in June 2006. Peter Travers wrote for Rolling Stone that "Lohan rises to the occasion, delivering a rock-the-house version of 'Frankie and Johnny.'" Co-star Streep said of Lohan's acting: "She's in command of the art form" and "completely, visibly living in front of the camera." The Emilio Estevez ensemble drama Bobby, about the hours leading up to the Robert F. Kennedy assassination, was released in theaters in November 2006. Lohan, who appeared as the character Diane, received favorable comments for her performance, particularly a scene alongside Sharon Stone. As part of the Bobby ensemble cast, Lohan was nominated for a Screen Actors Guild Award.

Lohan at the New York City premiere of Georgia Rule in May 2007

Lohan's next appearance was in Chapter 27 as a John Lennon fan who befriends Mark David Chapman, played by Jared Leto, on the day he murders Lennon. Filming finished in early 2006, but the film was not released until March 2008 due to difficulties in finding a distributor. In May 2007, the drama Georgia Rule was released. In the film, Lohan portrays an out-of-control teenager whose mother (Felicity Huffman) brings her to the house of her own estranged mother (Jane Fonda). Owen Gleiberman of Entertainment Weekly wrote that "Lohan hits a true note of spiteful princess narcissism." During filming in 2006, Lohan was hospitalized, her representative saying "she was overheated and dehydrated." In a letter that was made public, studio executive James G. Robinson called Lohan "irresponsible and unprofessional." He mentioned "various late arrivals and absences from the set" and said that "we are well aware that your ongoing all night heavy partying is the real reason for your so-called 'exhaustion.'" In 2007, Lohan was cast in the film Poor Things, however she would ultimately lose the role when she later entered rehab.

In January 2007, production on the film I Know Who Killed Me was put on hold when Lohan underwent appendix surgery. While Lohan was in rehab, she continued shooting the film, returning to the facility at night. Shortly thereafter, Lohan withdrew from a film adaptation of Oscar Wilde's A Woman of No Importance, her publicist stating that Lohan needed to "focus on getting better." Lohan was replaced in The Edge of Love in April 2007, shortly before filming was to begin, with the director citing "insurance reasons" and Lohan later explaining that she "was going through a really bad time then." Lohan withdrew from a scheduled appearance on The Tonight Show with Jay Leno in which she had been due to promote I Know Who Killed Me, a psychological horror-thriller in which she starred as a stripper with a dual personality. The film premiered in July 2007 to what Entertainment Weekly called "an abysmal $3.5 million." It earned Lohan dual Golden Raspberry awards for Worst Actress, with Lohan coming first and second, tying with herself. Hollywood executives and industry insiders commented that it would be difficult for Lohan to find employment until she could prove that she was sober and reliable, citing possible issues with securing insurance.

In May 2008, Lohan's single "Bossy" was released onto digital outlets, and reached number one on the US Billboard Hot Dance Club Play chart. That month, she made her first screen appearance since I Know Who Killed Me, on ABC's television series Ugly Betty. She guest starred in four episodes as Kimmie Keegan, an old schoolmate of the protagonist Betty Suarez. In the comedy Labor Pains, Lohan plays a woman who pretends to be pregnant. During the shoot, Lohan's manager worked with the paparazzi to encourage the media to show her work, as opposed to partying. It was originally planned for a theatrical release, but instead appeared as a TV movie on the ABC Family cable channel in July 2009, another "setback for the star" according to Variety. The premiere received 2.1 million viewers, "better-than-average" for the channel according to E! Online. Alessandra Stanley of The New York Times wrote that "this is not a triumphant return of a prodigal child star. ... [Labor Pains] never shakes free of the heavy baggage Ms. Lohan brings to the role." Lohan was a guest judge on US TV style contest Project Runway sixth-season premiere episode, which aired in August 2009.

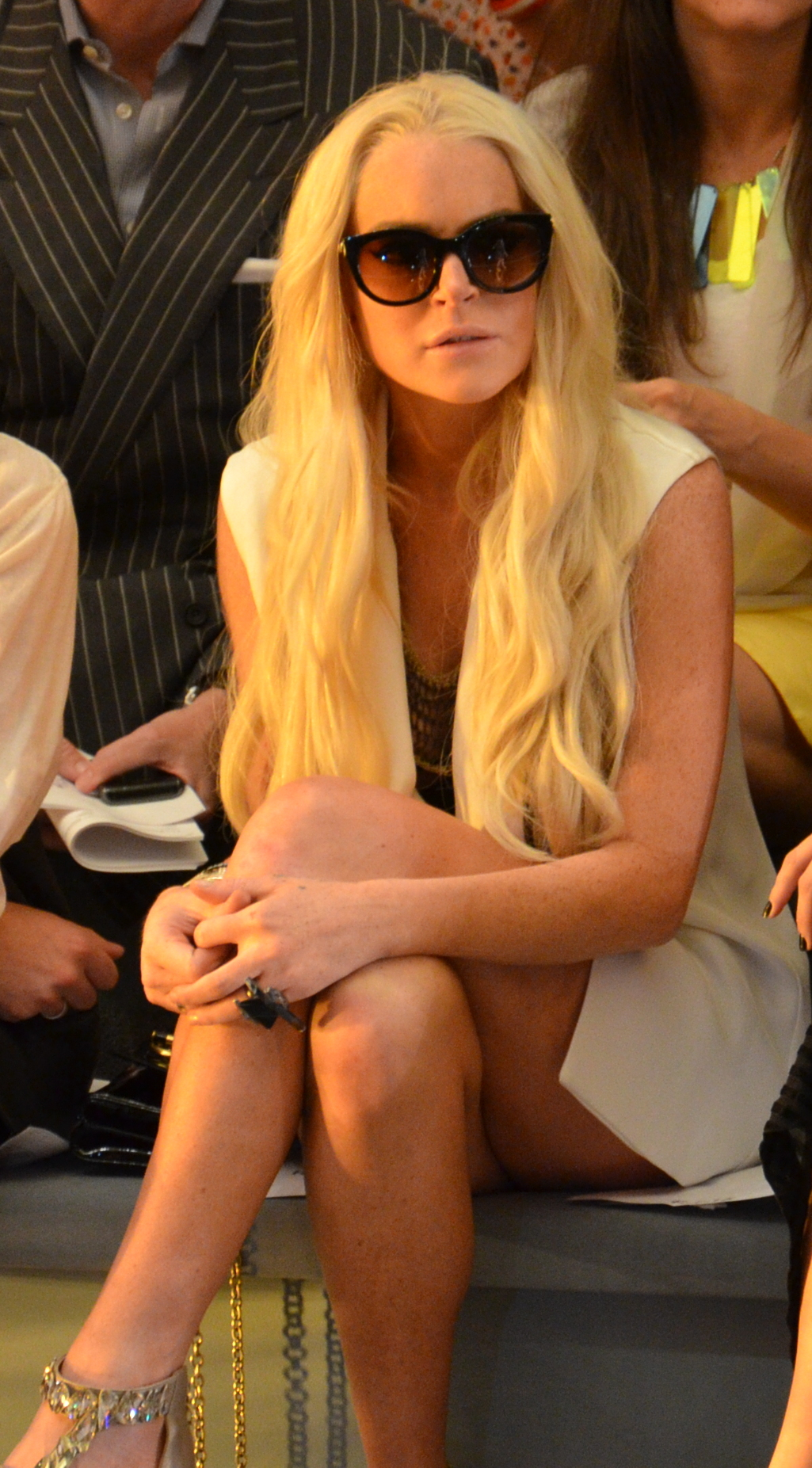
Lohan in 2011

Lohan narrated and presented the British television documentary Lindsay Lohan's Indian Journey, about human trafficking in India. It was filmed during a week in India in December 2009, and transmitted on BBC Three in April 2010. The BBC was criticized for having hired Lohan, and while reviewers called the documentary compelling, they also found Lohan's presence to be odd and distracting. Lohan said: "I hope my presence in India will bring awareness to the really important issues raised in making this film." In April 2010, Lohan was let go from the film The Other Side where she had been set to star, with the director saying she was "not bankable."

In June 2010, Lohan was the subject of a fashion shoot in the photographer docu-series Double Exposure on Bravo. Robert Rodriguez's action exploitation film Machete opened in September 2010. In the film, Lohan's character takes drugs, is naked in much of her appearance, and later dons a nun's habit while toting a machine gun. Its critical reviews were mixed. The Washington Post described her character as "a campier, trampier version of herself – or at least her tabloid image." Premiere.com said she was "terrible" while Variety called it "her best work in some time." Because of her rehabilitation and legal engagements, Lohan did not participate in promotion of the movie. Lohan filmed a sketch where she is dressed as Marilyn Monroe for Inappropriate Comedy in 2010. The film had issues finding a distributor and was not released until 2013, when it was met with poor box office and critical reception. Lohan appeared on the October 2010 cover of Vanity Fair. She told the magazine: "I want my career back" and "I know that I'm a damn good actress."

Lohan had not appeared on Saturday Night Live since 2006 until she hosted the show for the fourth time in March 2012. Her appearance received mixed to negative reviews. Critics appreciated the self-deprecating references to her personal troubles, but also commented that she largely played a supporting role. The episode had the second highest ratings of the season with 7.4 million viewers. In May 2012, Lohan appeared briefly, as a celebrity judge, on the television series Glee, in the episode "Nationals". Lohan stars as a surfer in the art film First Point by artist Richard Phillips. It debuted at Art Basel in June 2012 and features a score by Thomas Bangalter from Daft Punk. Comments from critics on Lohan's work were mixed.

Lohan starred as Elizabeth Taylor in the biographical made-for-TV movie Liz & Dick, which premiered on the Lifetime cable channel in November 2012. Reviews of Lohan's performance were largely, but not unanimously, negative. The Hollywood Reporter said she was "woeful" while Variety called her "adequate." Entertainment Weekly described the premiere ratings of 3.5 millions as "a little soft." During the production, paramedics were called to Lohan's hotel room, treating her for exhaustion and dehydration. In April 2013, the horror comedy Scary Movie 5 was released, where Lohan appears as herself alongside Charlie Sheen in the opening sketch. While the movie itself was panned by critics, a few reviewers found Lohan's and Sheen's to be one of the better scenes. Lohan also guest-starred as herself in an April 2013 episode of Sheen's comedy series Anger Management.

In August 2013, The Canyons was released, an independent erotic thriller directed by Paul Schrader and written by Bret Easton Ellis. It was made on a low budget, most of which was gathered through online fund raiser Kickstarter. Lohan received $100 a day and a share of the profits, and she was also credited as a co-producer. The New York Times Magazine described Lohan as difficult to work with, and the shoot as fraught with conflict between Lohan and Schrader. Lohan and her co-star, adult-film actor James Deen, portray an actress and a producer in a volatile relationship. Reviews for the film were generally poor, but several critics praised Lohan's performance. The New Yorker said she was "overwrought and unfocused" while Variety called her "very affecting" and Salon described her as "almost incandescent." The same month Lohan filled in for Chelsea Handler as host of the cable talk show Chelsea Lately. She received mostly positive reviews for her appearance and the show garnered its best ratings of the year.

=== Focus on television and career expansion (2014–2020) ===
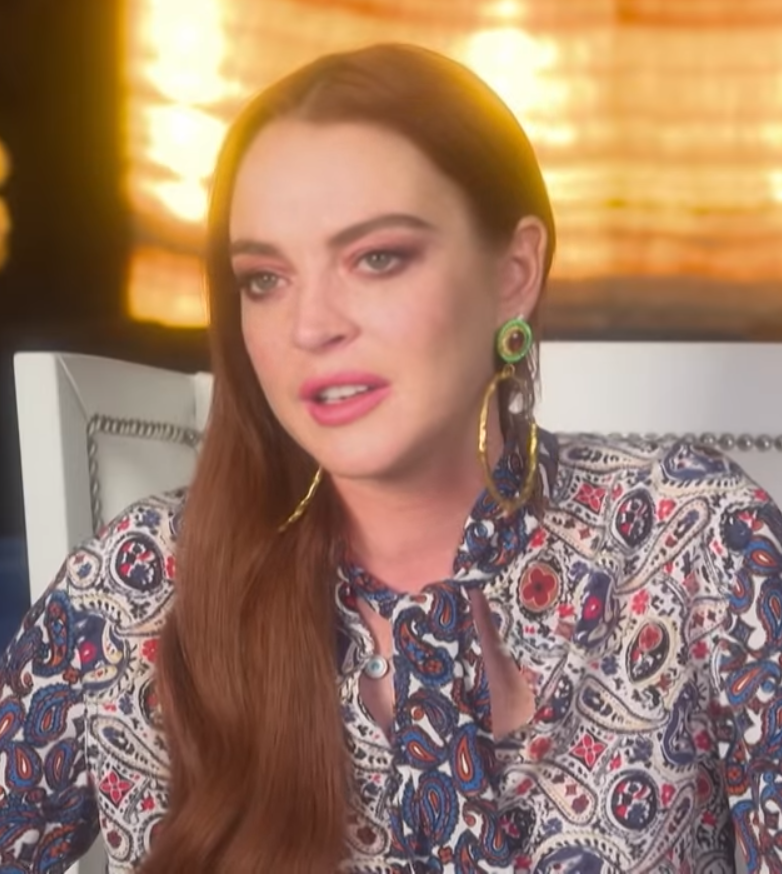
Lohan in 2019

The 8-part docu-series Lindsay aired in March and April 2014 on Oprah Winfrey's OWN cable network. The series followed Lohan's life and work as she moved to New York City after leaving rehab. In the final episode, Lohan said that she had had a miscarriage which had interrupted filming of the series. The premiere had 693,000 viewers, described as "so-so" by The Hollywood Reporter. The ratings then slipped and the finale only had 406,000 viewers. New York Daily News called the series "surprisingly routine", Variety described it as boring, while Liz Smith said it was "compelling" and "usually painful to watch." In December 2013, Lohan introduced Miley Cyrus before her set at Dick Clark's New Year's Rockin' Eve. In April 2014, Lohan guest-starred in an episode of the CBS sitcom 2 Broke Girls. Around this time, Lohan had also announced and begun promoting a film she was set to star in titled Inconceivable, which was never produced for unknown reasons.

Lohan made her stage debut in October 2014, starring in the London West End production of David Mamet's Speed-the-Plow, a satire about the movie business. She portrayed Karen, the secretary of a Hollywood executive, in a role originally played by Madonna. Reviews of Lohan's performance were mixed, with the Associated Press describing critical reception overall as "lukewarm." The Stage said she was "out of her league" while The Times wrote that she "can act a bit" and The Guardian said she "holds the stage with ease."

In 2015, English band Duran Duran announced that Lohan was featured on the song "Danceophobia" from their fourteenth studio album, Paper Gods. That year, she filmed an independent supernatural thriller, Among the Shadows, in Belgium. The project saw a series of delays with its release and was eventually listed for sale at the European Film Market at the Berlin International Film Festival in February 2018. It was released on March 5, 2019, by Momentum Pictures. In July 2018, the second season of Sick Note —in which Lohan had a recurring role— premiered on Sky One. Lohan signed on to star in an MTV reality series, Lindsay Lohan's Beach Club (2019) focusing on her business ventures in Greece, which aired on MTV for one season. In July 2019, it was announced that Lohan would be one of the panelists on the Australian edition of Masked Singer. The reality singing competition series premiered in September 2019, and concluded in October that year. On July 7, 2020, it was revealed that Lohan would be unable to return to the judging panel for the second season, as she could not travel from Dubai to Melbourne due to the COVID-19 pandemic and the implementation of travel restrictions.

In June 2019, Lohan re-signed with Casablanca Records, a subsidiary of Republic Records, to release new music. On April 1, 2020, Lohan announced she would be releasing "Back to Me", her first single in twelve years. The song was released on April 3 and received positive reviews from critics.

=== Return to film and resurgence (2021–present) ===
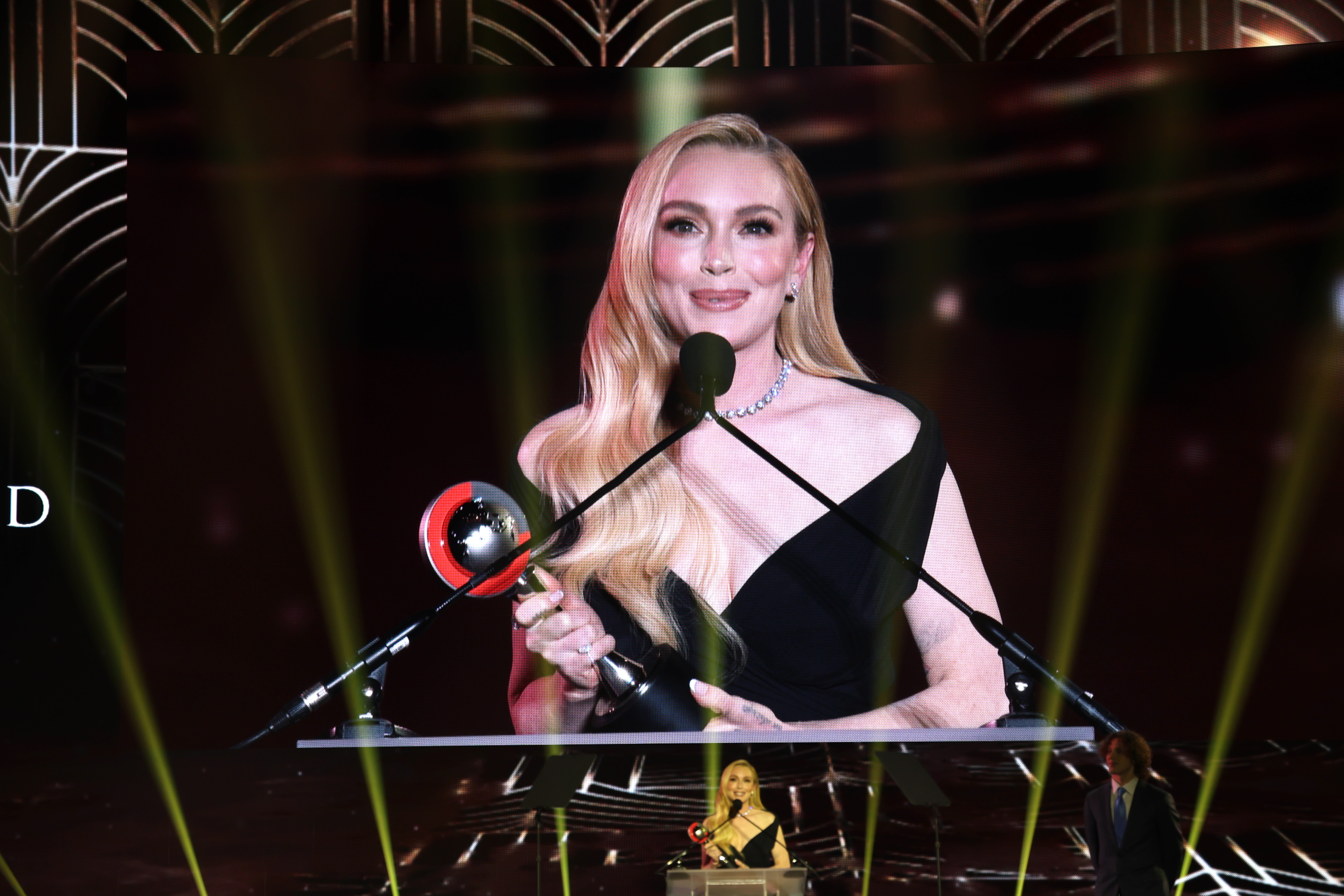
Lohan receiving the vanguard award in CinemaCon, 2025

In May 2021, Netflix announced that Lohan would return to acting by starring in a Christmas romantic comedy in which she would play a hotel heiress suffering from amnesia after a skiing accident. Falling for Christmas was released on November 10, 2022, marking her first role in a major production in over a decade. Lohan performed original songs for the film's soundtrack, as well as "Jingle Bell Rock", which was released as a promotional single. Falling for Christmas was the most-watched holiday movie released in 2022 in the United States. Lohan's performance in the film received generally positive reviews. In 2022, she also served as the narrator for Amazon Prime Video's reality dating show Lovestruck High.

In March 2022, Netflix revealed that Lohan had signed a deal to star in two more films for the streaming service. In September 2022, it was announced Lohan was set to star as a book editor in the romantic comedy Irish Wish, which was released in March 2024. Owen Gleiberman of Variety said that "Lohan hasn't lost her ability to light up a scene; she has a seasoned radiance." Stephanie Zacharek of Time agreed, and believed that "there's something both appealing and touching about this performance". The second film under the deal, Our Little Secret, began production in January 2024, and was released on November 27, 2024.

Lohan reunited with Jamie Lee Curtis for Freakier Friday (2025), in which she reprised her role as Anna Coleman. Her fifth feature-film with Walt Disney Pictures, it also marked her first wide theatrical release since Machete (2010), and her second highest-grossing film, with a global revenue of $153 million to date. She is set to star in and produce Hulu's drama series Count My Lies, her first starring role in a series, set to debut in 2027.

== Other ventures ==
=== Fashion ===
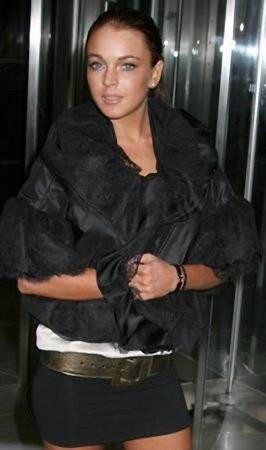
Lohan attending a Calvin Klein show afterparty in 2007

Lohan has been the face of Jill Stuart, Miu Miu, and the 2008 Visa Swap British fashion campaign. She was also the face of Italian clothing company Fornarina for its Spring–Summer 2009 campaign. Lohan has a fascination with Marilyn Monroe dating to when she saw Niagara during The Parent Trap shoot. In the 2008 Spring Fashion edition of New York magazine, Lohan re-created Monroe's final photo shoot, known as The Last Sitting, including nudity, and called the shoot "an honor".

In 2008, Lohan launched a clothing line, 6126, whose name represents Monroe's birthdate (June 1, 1926). The line started with leggings before expanding to a full collection, covering 280 pieces as of April 2010. In January 2009, Lohan appeared as a guest judge on Project Runway. In September 2009, she became an artistic adviser for the French fashion house Emanuel Ungaro. A collection by designer Estrella Archs with Lohan as adviser was presented in October, receiving a "disastrous" reception, according to Entertainment Weekly and New York. Lohan left the company in March 2010. She appeared in the January–February 2012 issue of Playboy magazine, in a shoot inspired by a nude pictorial of Marilyn Monroe from the magazine's first issue. Editor Hugh Hefner said Lohan's issue was "breaking sales records".

In 2020, Lohan designed and released a jewelry line in collaboration with UK-based boutique brand Lily Baker. In 2022, she launched a limited-edition sneaker collection in collaboration with activewear brand Allbirds. In 2023, Lohan designed a line of ocean-themed nursery accessories in collaboration with Nestig.

=== Hospitality ===
In 2018, she opened a beach resort on the Greek island Mykonos and later her second resort in Ialisos Beach, Rhodes.

=== Digital ===
In 2014, the free-to-play video game app Lindsay Lohan's The Price of Fame was released for the iOS and Android operating systems. In 2017, Lohan launched a lifestyle site, Preemium, which subscribers could access for $2.99 a month.

In 2021, Red Arrow's Studio71 revealed it had signed Lohan to host and launch a new podcast. It was then announced the podcast would be titled The Lohdown with Lindsay Lohan. It premiered in April 2022 and ran until September of that year.

== Personal life ==
Lohan's personal life has received much media attention since her teenage years, particularly after a series of legal problems and arrests, which continued until 2013. The year 2015 marked the first time she had been probation-free in over eight years. She had a turbulent childhood that she spoke about in 2007, the year her parents finalized their divorce: "I feel like a second parent in the sense that I helped raise my family ... I was put between my mother and father a lot". Despite the conflicts, Lohan spoke very fondly of her family but in the late 2000s, she said she had cut off contact with her father, calling his behavior unpredictable and hard to deal with. In 2023, Lohan stated that she maintained a good relationship with both of her parents. The family reunited in April, reportedly for the first time in at least seven years.

Lohan has had many high-profile relationships, including with actor Wilmer Valderrama in 2004, Hard Rock Cafe heir Harry Morton in 2006, DJ Samantha Ronson in 2008, and London-based Russian business heir Egor Tarabasov in 2016. On November 28, 2021, Lohan announced her engagement to financier Bader Shammas after three years of dating. Bader Shammas is a Kuwaiti citizen and a member of the Shammas family, one of the twelve Kuwaiti Christian families. On July 2, 2022, a representative confirmed Lohan and Shammas were married after she called him her "husband" on her Instagram birthday post. Lohan later revealed they had wed on April 3, 2022. In July 2023, she gave birth to their son in Dubai, where she has resided since 2014.

== Filmography ==
After beginning her acting career as a child actor in the early 1990s, Lohan, at age eleven, made her film debut in Disney's hugely successful remake of The Parent Trap (1998). Freaky Friday (2003) remains her highest-grossing film, while Mean Girls (2004), both a critical and commercial success, became a cult classic. Though her career was often interrupted by legal and personal troubles during the late 2000s and early 2010s, she has appeared in over 30 films and has multiple other acting credits as of 2026.

== Discography ==
- Speak (2004)
- A Little More Personal (Raw) (2005)

== See also ==
- List of awards and nominations received by Lindsay Lohan
- List of artists who reached number one on the U.S. Dance Club Songs chart

== Cited works ==
- Apodaca, Rose (March 2008). "Lindsay's Super Comeback". Harper's Bazaar. Archived from the original on February 10, 2008.
- Bachrach, Judy (May 1, 2007). "Coming of Age". Allure.(subscription required)
- Binelli, Mark (August 19, 2004). "Confessions of a Teenage Drama Queen". Rolling Stone. Archived from the original on May 21, 2006.
- Finn, Natalie (February 1, 2007). "Lindsay, Focusing on Recovery, Loses Importance". E! Online. Archived from the original on May 25, 2012.
- Halbfinger, David M. (July 25, 2007). "Lohan's Arrest Spells Trouble for 2 Movies". The New York Times. Archived from the original on November 6, 2014.
- Kaylin, Lucy (October 2008). "You Don't Mess With the Lohan". Marie Claire. Archived from the original on July 22, 2012.
- Peretz, Evgenia (February 1, 2006). "Confessions of a Teenage Movie Queen". Vanity Fair.(subscription required)

Media offices
Preceded by Seann William Scott and Justin Timberlake	MTV Movie Awards host 2004	Succeeded by Jimmy Fallon
Preceded by James Denton and Carmen Electra	World Music Awards host 2006	Succeeded by Roger Moore
Acting roles
Preceded by Hayley Mills	Twin daughters actress from The Parent Trap; 1998	Most recent
Preceded by Gaby Hoffmann	Daughter actress from Freaky Friday; 2003	Succeeded by Cozi Zuehlsdorff
First actress	Cady Heron actress from Mean Girls; 2004	Succeeded by Angourie Rice
Preceded by Cozi Zuehlsdorff	Daughter actress from Freakier Friday; 2025	Most recent
