= Lindsay (TV series) =

- Genre: Docuseries
- Directed by: Amy Rice
- Starring: Lindsay Lohan
- Country of origin: United States
- Original language: English
- No. of seasons: 1
- No. of episodes: 8

Production
- Executive producers: Craig Piligian; Johnny Gould; Nicholas Caprio
- Camera setup: Multiple
- Running time: 42 minutes
- Production company: Pilgrim Films and Television

Original release
- Network: Oprah Winfrey Network
- Release: March 9 – April 20, 2014

Lindsay is an American docuseries that documents actress Lindsay Lohan's rehabilitation recovery and work following a public period of struggles in her personal life and career. The series premiered on March 9, 2014, on the Oprah Winfrey Network, and concluded on April 20, 2014. Premiere ratings were described as "modest" and then dropped, while critical reception was mixed.

== Background and production ==
In July 2013, an Oprah Winfrey Network spokesperson confirmed that Oprah Winfrey had reached a deal to do a one-on-one interview with Lohan for Oprah's Next Chapter, to be followed by an eight-episode series. The interview was Lohan's first interview post-rehab. Filming of Lindsay began in August 2013 in New York City. Network promotion described the series as an "honest, no-holds-barred account" of Lohan's life. It was directed by Amy Rice, who previously co-directed the 2009 HBO documentary By the People: The Election of Barack Obama.

== Reception ==
The premiere had 693,000 viewers, described as "so-so" by The Hollywood Reporter and "modest" by Entertainment Weekly. It had the highest ratings of OWN's 2014 unscripted premieres, and with young women 18–34, ratings were up 231% from the previous year. In comparison, the 2013 interview with Lohan on Oprah's Next Chapter drew 892,000 viewers. By the second episode, ratings had dropped by 24% to 527,000 viewers, and with OWN's target demographic of women 25–54 years old, ratings dropped by 36%. The penultimate episode had 468,000 viewers and the two-hour finale ratings were down to 406,000.

David Hinckley of New York Daily News said the first episode was "surprisingly routine" adding "it's unlikely she could do anything in front of Oprah's cameras that would slam into or clear the bar she has set in the past." Brian Lowry of Variety described the first episode as boring, and said that OWN and Lohan were "using each other" adding that "'Lindsay' says far more about OWN than it does about Lohan." Liz Smith found the series "compelling" and "usually painful to watch", and she also said that "[Lohan], clearly, had no part in the editing." Daniel D'Addario of Salon called the series "an unmitigated disaster" and "a strange clash of dueling brands" and criticized the way the network handled the disclosure of Lohan's miscarriage.

== Episodes ==
No.	Title	Original release date	U.S. viewers (millions)
1	"Part One"	March 9, 2014	0.69
Lohan moves to New York after her sixth stay in rehab to work on rebuilding her career while staying sober.
2	"Part Two"	March 16, 2014	0.53
Lohan struggles to move into her apartment, is forced to deal with her mother's recent DUI and has a heated encounter with her father Michael Lohan.
3	"Part Three"	March 23, 2014	0.59
Oprah Winfrey travels to Lohan's mother's Long Island home after Lohan refuses to let cameras film and her assistant threatens to quit.
4	"Part Four"	March 30, 2014	N/A
After visiting with Winfrey, Lohan does a skit with Jimmy Fallon in an attempt to rebuild her career, and she finds herself in charge of her own sobriety when her coach returns to Los Angeles.
5	"Part Five"	April 6, 2014	0.39
The rest of Lohan's belongings arrive at her apartment, and her life coach questions her sobriety.
6	"Part Six"	April 13, 2014	0.47
Lohan deals with the public scrutiny after affiliating herself with a Halloween party. Later, tardiness gets her into trouble at a photo shoot. Dina Lohan needs Lohan to sit down for an interview regarding her mother's autobiography.
7	"Part Seven"	April 20, 2014	0.39
Lohan introduces Miley Cyrus at the Jingle Ball, and later begins working on her latest role.
8	"Part Eight"	April 20, 2014	0.43
Lohan continues to work on her business ventures in New York. She reveals she had a miscarriage which interrupted filming of the series.
