= 1993 in American television =

In American television in 1993, notable events included television series debuts, finales, cancellations, and channel initiations, closures and rebrandings, as well as information about controversies and disputes.

== Events ==
Date	Event
January 3	ABC and CBS simultaneously broadcast their own movies based on Amy Fisher's life, with Fisher played by Drew Barrymore (for ABC) and Alyssa Milano (for CBS); NBC had broadcast its own version of the Fisher saga six days earlier (December 28, 1992).
January 8	ABC affiliate KOUS-TV (now Fox affiliate KHMT) in Billings, Montana, which had suffered reception problems for most of its history, signs off the air (it will return to the air as KHMT in August 1995). Later that day, KSVI signs-on the air, taking KOUS-TV's intellectual unit and ABC affiliation with it.
January 11	Monday Night Raw airs its first episode, live from the Grand Ballroom at the Manhattan Center in New York City, on the USA Network. In the main event, The Undertaker defeats Damien Demento.
January 14	David Letterman announces during a press conference that he will be moving his late-night program from NBC to CBS come August 1993.
January 15	The series finale of Santa Barbara airs on NBC. In it, Sophia and C.C. Capwell move towards a reconciliation, Kelly finds love with Connor McCabe, and at Warren and B.J.'s wedding, unbalanced Andie Klein aims a gun at the crowd; however, she is quickly disarmed and carried away by Connor. This is then followed by a roll-call list of the cast and crew. The final shot consists of executive producer Paul Rauch standing in front of the camera, smashing a cigar under his shoe, and walking away.
January 16	On NBC's Saturday Night Live, Madonna parodies Marilyn Monroe's "Happy Birthday Mr. President, as “Happy Inauguration Mr. President”. On the same episode, she imitates Sinéad O'Connor's actions from earlier in the season.
January 19	Fox expands its regular prime-time schedule to seven days a week; the network celebrates by premiering two dramas on this Tuesday: Class of '96 and Key West.
January 20	Warner Bros. Television Distribution launches the Prime Time Entertainment Network.
January 31	The Super Bowl, broadcast by NBC, has a solo halftime performer for the first time—Michael Jackson, who performed a medley of his most successful songs.
February 6	Dana Carvey makes his final appearance as a cast member on NBC's Saturday Night Live. By the end of the season on May 15, Chris Rock and Robert Smigel would also make their final appearances on SNL as cast members.
February 10	Oprah Winfrey interviews Michael Jackson during a live primetime special on ABC, hosted at Jackson's Neverland Ranch (Jackson's first TV interview since 1979 with Sylvia Chase for 20/20).
February 10	Fox gets a full-time home in Grand Junction, Colorado when KFQX signs-on the air.
February 24	Michael Jackson receives a Grammy Legend Award at the 35th Annual Grammy Awards, presented by his younger sister, Janet. The ceremony is broadcast by CBS.
February 26	The Days of Our Lives nighttime special Night Sins is broadcast by NBC.
March 2	Indiana Jones and the Last Crusade makes its network television premiere on CBS.
March 4	ESPN holds the first ever ESPY Awards. The highlight is Jim Valvano's speech while accepting the inaugural Arthur Ashe Courage and Humanitarian Award. He announced the creation of The V Foundation for Cancer Research, an organization dedicated to finding a cure for cancer. Less than two months after his famous ESPY speech, Valvano died following a nearly yearlong battle with metastatic cancer.
March 13	Harrison Ford appears as Indiana Jones in the bookend scenes for an episode of The Young Indiana Jones Chronicles on ABC.
March 28	Through a brokered deal with ESPN, ABC begins the first of a two-year deal with the National Hockey League to televise six regional Sunday afternoon broadcasts (including the first three Sundays of the playoffs). This marked the first time that regular season National Hockey League games were broadcast on American network television since 1974–75 (when NBC was the NHL's American broadcast television partner).
April 4	The ninth annual WrestleMania event is broadcast on pay-per-view. This was the first WrestleMania event to be held outdoors as it took place at Caesars Palace in Paradise, Nevada. This was also the first World Wrestling Federation event to feature Jim Ross as a commentator. The main event saw Hulk Hogan defeating Yokozuna, who had won the belt moments prior, to win the WWF Championship (Hogan actually wrestled earlier in the night, teaming up with Brutus Beefcake in a loss to Money Inc. via DQ and failed to win the WWF Tag Team Championship).
April 18	The Disney Channel celebrates its 10th anniversary.
April 25	Lorne Michaels chooses Conan O'Brien, who was a writer for The Simpsons at the time and a former writer for Michaels at Saturday Night Live, to fill David Letterman's old seat directly after The Tonight Show on NBC.
May 5	Senior As the World Turns cast member Don Hastings hosts a memorial tribute to Douglas Marland. Marland, who died during March after an abdominal surgery procedure, had been the series' chief writer since 1985 and was responsible for several story lines on the CBS soap opera.
May 5	The series finale of Quantum Leap is broadcast on NBC. Two title cards were tacked on to the end of the last episode; one read that Al's first wife Beth never remarried, so they were still married in the present day and had four daughters. The last title cards said "Sam Becket [sic] never returned home." The finale was met by viewers with mixed feelings.
May 8	The intended hour long series finale of A Different World is broadcast on NBC, who would go on to air four additional episodes through July 9, 1993. Three remaining episodes would make their debuts in syndication. In the finale, Dwayne, Whitley, and their unborn child prepare to move to Japan, where Dwayne is offered a job.
May 13	The fourth-season finale of the Fox cartoon-sitcom The Simpsons features guest appearances from Johnny Carson, Hugh Hefner, Bette Midler, Luke Perry, Elizabeth Taylor, Red Hot Chili Peppers, and Barry White.
May 13	Knots Landing airs a two-hour series finale on CBS.
May 14	Jaimee Foxworth (Judy) and Telma Hopkins (Rachel) make their final regular appearances on the ABC sitcom Family Matters; though Hopkins later makes return guest appearances on the series as Rachel while Foxworth's character Judy disappears without explanation.
May 19	The gang at West Beverly graduate from high school in the Season 3 finale of Beverly Hills, 90210 on Fox.
May 20	NBC airs the fourth season finale of Seinfeld, expanded to 60 minutes. The episode concludes a season-long story sequence involving a pilot show written by Jerry and George, with the pilot finally coming to fruition only to be refused by NBC executives. Immediately afterwards, 80.4 million people tune to NBC to watch the series finale of Cheers.
May 23	One month after federal agents make an infamous raid on David Koresh's Waco, Texas, compound, NBC broadcasts a hastily produced television movie based on the incident, In the Line of Duty: Ambush in Waco; Tim Daly plays Koresh for the movie.
May 28	Major League Baseball's owners overwhelmingly approve a six-year joint venture with ABC and NBC. The venture, eventually dubbed "The Baseball Network", displaces CBS as MLB's primary network television package holder.
June 1	Connie Chung begins co-anchoring CBS Evening News with Dan Rather.
June 13	The World Wrestling Federation holds the inaugural King of the Ring event on pay-per-view. Hulk Hogan would lose the WWF Championship against Yokozuna in what would be Hogan's final appearance on the WWF's television programming until 2002.
June 16	While appearing as a guest on Yo! MTV Raps, Tupac Shakur confesses to physically assaulting film directors Albert Hughes and Allen Hughes in retaliation for his firing from the film Menace II Society.
June 18	Dian Parkinson makes her final appearance as one of "Barker's Beauties" on The Price Is Right, ending her 18-year tenure on the CBS game show.
June 25	David Letterman broadcasts his last late-night talk show with NBC.
June 26	The final episode of Soul Train with Don Cornelius as host airs in first-run syndication.
July 2	Don Drysdale makes what turns out to be his final broadcast for the Los Angeles Dodgers. He provided play-by-play on the first six innings for a game between the Dodgers and Montreal Expos on KTLA 5, before handing it off to Vin Scully. Drysdale later died of a heart attack in his hotel's room, in Montreal, in the early hours of the following night.
July 13	The Major League Baseball All-Star Game airs on CBS for the fourth consecutive year. Played in Baltimore, this is to date, the final time that CBS would broadcast Major League Baseball's All-Star Game.
August 3	Gayle Gardner becomes the first woman to do televised play-by-play of a baseball game when she called the action of a game between the Colorado Rockies and the Cincinnati Reds.
August 18	At Clash of the Champions XXIV on TBS, the professional wrestler known as the Shockmaster botches his debut appearance in World Championship Wrestling by tripping and falling face first to the ground after crashing through a wall on Ric Flair's interview segment "A Flair for the Gold".
August 28	Mighty Morphin Power Rangers, the first Power Rangers entry, debuted on Fox Kids. It would soon become a 1990s pop culture phenomenon along with a large line of toys, action figures, and other merchandise. The show adapts stock footage from the Japanese TV series Kyōryū Sentai Zyuranger (1992–1993), which is the 16th installment of Toei's Super Sentai franchise.
August 30	Late Show with David Letterman premieres on CBS, with actor Bill Murray and musical guest Billy Joel.
August 30	PBS introduces new branding for their children's programs featuring "The P-Pals".
September 3	Sally Jessy Raphael Show airs for the last time on WABC-TV and KCAL-TV in the New York and Los Angeles areas respectively. The following Tuesday, The Les Brown Show takes over the WABC spot. Sally would move to WNBC and KNBC in said areas.
September 10	The pilot episode of The X-Files airs on Fox. As the pilot, it would set up the mythology storyline for the series. The episode earns a Nielsen rating of 7.9 and is viewed by 7.4 million households and 12.0 million viewers. The episode itself is generally well received by fans and critics alike, which leads to a growing cult following for the series before it hits the mainstream.
September 12	Raymond Burr dies of liver cancer at his ranch home in California at the age of 76. (The last Perry Mason movie, Perry Mason: The Case of the Killer Kiss, airs on NBC on November 29, carrying a dedication to Burr with an in memoriam tribute at the end of the movie.)
September 13	Late Night with Conan O'Brien premieres on NBC, as O'Brien replaces David Letterman as host.
September 13	Xuxa debuts her English program in syndication, becoming the first Brazilian person to host a TV show in US.
September 15	S. Epatha Merkerson and Jill Hennessy make their first appearances on NBC's Law & Order as Lieutenant Anita Van Buren and Assistant District Attorney Claire Kincaid respectively. This is the first time women played any of Law & Order's six major characters: both roles will continue to be occupied by women, with Merkerson remaining in the role of Van Buren, through the show's cancellation at the end of its 20th season.
September 16	Marc Wilmore, Reggie McFadden, Jay Leggett, Carol Rosenthal and Anne-Marie Johnson join the cast of the Fox series In Living Color for its final season. None of the Wayans family are involved at all during the season.
September 16	The pilot episode of Frasier airs on NBC. It introduces the primary characters and settings, and distances itself from its parent series Cheers. The episode also sets up a number of recurring gags for the series, such as Martin's Lazyboy recliner and the unseen character of Maris Crane, Niles' wife. For his performance in this episode, Kelsey Grammer would win the Primetime Emmy Award for Outstanding Lead Actor in a Comedy Series.
September 18	On Beakman's World on CBS, Liza (played by Eliza Schneider) makes her debut as the new assistant/co-host. Lasting 39 episodes, Liza would be the longest tenured assistant on the show.
September 19	The 45th Primetime Emmy Awards ceremony is broadcast on ABC.
September 21	The pilot episode for NYPD Blue is broadcast on ABC. The series includes more nudity and raw language than is common on broadcast television at the time. This results in at least 30 of the network's affiliates—mostly in smaller markets—not running the series when it debuts, with the show airing in many of those markets on a Fox affiliate or independent station live or delayed.
September 24	Raven-Symoné, Nell Carter and Saundra Quarterman join the cast of the series Hangin' with Mr. Cooper on ABC.
September 24	The pilot episode for Boy Meets World is broadcast on ABC as part of the network's popular TGIF comedy block following Family Matters and before Step by Step. It would face competition from hour-long shows The Adventures of Brisco County, Jr. (Fox) and a special episode of Blossom (NBC), as well as half-hour comedy Family Album (CBS) in the same 8:30 p.m. timeslot. It would debut to 16.5 million viewers, ranking it as the fifth highest-viewed show of the night, and tied with another ABC series Matlock as the 48th ranked broadcast of the week.
October 4	Britney Spears, Justin Timberlake, Christina Aguilera, and Ryan Gosling join the cast of the Disney Channel series The New Mickey Mouse Club.
October 23	CBS's four-year broadcast relationship with Major League Baseball ends with Toronto Blue Jays outfielder Joe Carter's walk-off home run to win the World Series against the Philadelphia Phillies. (Bob Seger's song "The Famous Final Scene" plays during the broadcast's closing credits.)
October 25	The Rocky Horror Picture Show makes its TV debut on Fox; the movie is inter-cut with a live cast performance.
October 27	Paramount Pictures and Chris-Craft Industries announce the formation of the United Paramount Network.
October 29	The first Got Milk? commercial is broadcast on TV. Directed by Michael Bay, a guy obsessed by the history of the duel hears a voice on the radio asking a $10,000 question, "Who shot Alexander Hamilton in that famous duel?", while making and eating a peanut butter sandwich. The question was transferred to the telephone, answers the correct answer "Aaron Burr", but the person on the telephone can't hear it clearly with his mouth full of peanut butter sandwich before time ends, and he only has a few drops of milk left.
October 30	Michael J. Nelson makes his debut as host of Mystery Science Theater 3000 on Comedy Central. Nelson replaced Joel Hodgson, who departed from the series the week prior.
November 2	Warner Bros. Entertainment announces the formation of The WB Television Network, which will premiere in January 1995.
November 9	On CNN, Larry King moderates a debate between Ross Perot and Al Gore on the North American Free Trade Agreement that was watched in 11.174 million households – the largest audience ever for a program on an ad-supported cable network until the October 23, 2006 New York Giants-Dallas Cowboys game on ESPN's Monday Night Football.
November 12	The UFC puts on their first ever pay-per-view event in Denver.
November 21	Bill Bixby dies of prostate cancer at the age of 59 (six days after his final directing job on NBC's Blossom).
November 22	TV Food Network (later, just Food Network) makes its debut with two initial shows featuring David Rosengarten, Donna Hanover, and Robin Leach. The following day, TV Food Network would begin live broadcasting. One if its first shows is How to Boil Water, which is first hosted by Emeril Lagasse.
November 25	Home Alone makes its network television premiere on NBC.
November 26	Cartoon Network, TBS, and TNT all broadcast 14 hours of animated programs as part of "The Great International Toon-In". Interstitials during the event introduced the Cartoon Network's new motion capture animated character Moxy, which would be the star of Cartoon Network's first original animated program, The Moxy Show.
December 18	CBS (which had been a broadcaster of National Football League games for 38 years) loses their rights to telecast National Football Conference games to Fox. Fox wins the rights to NFC games by offering a then-record $1.58 billion to the NFL over four years, significantly more than the $290 million per year CBS was willing to pay.

== Programs ==
=== Debuts ===
Date	Show	Network
January 1	Dr. Quinn, Medicine Woman	CBS
January 3	Star Trek: Deep Space Nine	Syndication
January 6	Space Rangers	CBS
January 8	Hotel Room	HBO
January 11	The Untouchables	Syndication
January 11	WWF Monday Night Raw	USA Network
January 18	Scattergories	NBC
January 19	Class of '96	Fox
January 19	Key West	Fox
January 20	Time Trax	PTEN
January 27	Kung Fu: The Legend Continues	PTEN
January 31	Homicide: Life on the Street	NBC
February 8	Day One	ABC
February 28	Bonkers	Syndication
March 5	Getting By	ABC
March 5	Where I Live	ABC
March 8	Beavis and Butt-Head	MTV
March 10	How'd They Do That?	CBS
March 10	Sirens	ABC
March 22	Family Secrets	NBC
March 22	Real Stories of the Highway Patrol	Syndication
March 23	TriBeCa	Fox
March 29	10 Seconds	The Nashville Network
March 31	Home Free	ABC
April 2	Good Advice	CBS
April 6	ECW Hardcore TV	Syndication
April 10	A League of Their Own	CBS
April 16	Dudley	CBS
May 22	Saved by the Bell: The College Years	NBC
May 24	Equal Time	CNBC
June 6	South Beach	NBC
June 7	Rumor Has It	VH1
June 7	Trivial Pursuit	The Family Channel
June 11	Cutters	CBS
June 14	John and Leeza from Hollywood	NBC
June 14	Caesar's Challenge	NBC
June 23	Family Dog	CBS
June 25	Johnny Bago	CBS
June 26	Front Page	Fox
July 5	Theodore Tugboat	PBS
July 10	Brains & Brawn	NBC
July 11	Danger Theatre	Fox
July 11	Weinerville	Nickelodeon
July 25	Politically Incorrect	Comedy Central
July 28	Street Match	ABC
August 1	Fallen Angels	Showtime
August 9	Big Wave Dave's	CBS
August 18	Now with Tom Brokaw and Katie Couric	NBC
August 20	The Building	CBS
August 22	Living Single	Fox
August 25	The Trouble with Larry	CBS
August 25	Tall Hopes	CBS
August 26	Angel Falls	CBS
August 27	The Adventures of Brisco County, Jr.	Fox
August 28	Mighty Morphin Power Rangers	Fox Kids
August 30	Late Show with David Letterman	CBS
August 30	Missing Persons	ABC
September 2	The John Larroquette Show	NBC
September 5	2 Stupid Dogs	TBS
September 5	Daddy Dearest	Fox
September 5	NFL Matchup	ESPN
September 6	NFL Prime Monday	ESPN
September 6	Adventures of Sonic the Hedgehog	Syndication
September 6	American Journal	Syndication
September 6	The Les Brown Show	Syndication
September 7	The Chevy Chase Show	Fox
September 8	Thea	ABC
September 10	The X-Files	Fox
September 10	Bill Nye the Science Guy	PBS/Syndication
September 11	Running the Halls	TNBC
September 11	Entertainers with Byron Allen	Syndication
September 11	Legends of the Hidden Temple	Nickelodeon
September 11	Droopy, Master Detective	Fox Kids
September 11	SWAT Kats: The Radical Squadron	Cartoon Network
September 11	Saved by the Bell: The New Class	TNBC
September 12	Baby Races	TNBC
September 12	Lois & Clark: The New Adventures of Superman	ABC
September 12	Townsend Television	Fox
September 12	seaQuest DSV	NBC
September 13	Late Night with Conan O'Brien	NBC
September 13	Animaniacs	Fox Kids
September 13	The Bertice Berry Show	Syndication
September 13	Ricki Lake	Syndication
September 13	Xuxa	Syndication
September 14	Bakersfield P.D.	Fox
September 14	Madeline	The Family Channel
September 14	Phenom	ABC
September 15	Moon Over Miami	ABC
September 16	The Sinbad Show	Fox
September 16	Frasier	NBC
September 16	Cobra	Syndication
September 18	Biker Mice from Mars	Syndication
September 18	Exosquad	Syndication
September 18	Martha Stewart Living	Syndication
September 18	CityKids	ABC
September 18	Cro	ABC
September 18	Sonic the Hedgehog	ABC
September 18	Tales from the Cryptkeeper	ABC
September 18	Café Americain	NBC
September 18	The Mommies	NBC
September 18	Rocko's Modern Life	Nickelodeon
September 18	All-New Dennis the Menace	CBS
September 18	Cadillacs and Dinosaurs	CBS
September 18	Marsupilami	CBS
September 18	The New Adventures of Speed Racer	First-run syndication
September 20	Dave's World	CBS
September 21	NYPD Blue	ABC
September 23	Eye to Eye with Connie Chung	CBS
September 24	Boy Meets World	ABC
September 25	Harts of the West	CBS
September 25	Walker, Texas Ranger	CBS
September 28	Acapulco H.E.A.T.	Syndication
September 29	Grace Under Fire	ABC
September 29	Joe's Life	ABC
October 1	Against the Grain	NBC
October 3	Late Edition with Wolf Blitzer	CNN
October 25	The Jon Stewart Show	MTV
October 27	South of Sunset	CBS
October 29	Diagnosis: Murder	CBS
October 30	The Paula Poundstone Show	ABC
November 3	The Nanny	CBS
November 5	George	ABC
November 23	How to Boil Water	Food Network
November 28	The Adventures of Pete & Pete	Nickelodeon
December 2	Second Chances	CBS
December 5	The Moxy Pirate Show	Cartoon Network
December 17	Off Beat Cinema	WKBW-TV
December 17	Scientific American Frontiers	PBS
December 17	The State	MTV

=== Returning this year ===
Show	Last aired	Previous network	New title	New network	Returning
Scrabble	1990	NBC	Same	Same	January 18
Brains & Brawn	1958	NBC	Same	Same	July 10
The Atom Ant/Secret Squirrel Show	1968	NBC	Super Secret Secret Squirrel	TBS/Cartoon Network	September 5
Captain Planet and the Planeteers	1992	TBS	The New Adventures of Captain Planet	TBS/Cartoon Network	September 12

=== Ending this year ===
Date	Show	Debut
January 4	WWF Prime Time Wrestling	1985
January 8	Hotel Room	1993
January 15	Santa Barbara	1984
January 16	The Powers That Be	1992
January 17	The Ben Stiller Show	1992
February 13	Double Dare (returned in 2000)	1986
February 26	Camp Wilder	1992
March 24	Doogie Howser, M.D.	1989
March 31	Homicide: Life on the Street (returned in 1994)	1993
April 17	Raven	1992
April 26	Homefront	1991
April 27	Reasonable Doubts	1991
April 30	The Jackie Thomas Show	1992
May 5	Quantum Leap	1989
May 12	The Wonder Years	1988
May 13	Knots Landing	1979
May 14	The Golden Palace	1992
May 17	Major Dad	1989
May 20	Cheers	1982
May 22	Saved by the Bell	1989
May 23	Life Goes On	1989
May 23	The Pirates of Dark Water	1991
May 23	Shaky Ground	1992
May 24	Designing Women	1986
May 25	Class of '96	1993
May 29	Street Justice	1991
June 1	FBI: The Untold Stories	1991
June 6	The Torkelsons	1991
June 11	Scrabble	1984
June 11	Shining Time Station	1989
June 13	Parker Lewis Can't Lose	1990
June 18	Harry and the Hendersons	1991
June 25	Late Night with David Letterman	1982
July 6	Room for Two	1992
July 7	Sirens (returned in 1994)	1993
July 9	A Different World	1987
August 6	Perfect Strangers	1986
August 6	Brooklyn Bridge	1991
August 25	Delta	1992
September 3	Studs	1991
October 1	The Chevy Chase Show	1993
October 10	American Heroes & Legends	1992
October 23	Major League Baseball on CBS	1990
October 27	South of Sunset	1993
October 30	Angel Falls	1993
November 6	The Addams Family	1992
November 20	Where I Live	1993
December 1	Moon Over Miami	1993
December 3	Adventures of Sonic the Hedgehog	1993
December 4	Tom & Jerry Kids	1990
December 4	Wild West C.O.W.-Boys of Moo Mesa	1992
December 4	Droopy: Master Detective	1993
December 11	Marsupilami	1993
December 11	The New Adventures of Speed Racer	1993
December 15	Joe's Life	1993
December 24	Against the Grain	1993
December 26	Townsend Television	
December 27	Bob	1992
December 31	The Joan Rivers Show	1989

=== Entering syndication this year ===
Show	Seasons	In Production	Notes	Source
1st & Ten	6	No		
Adventures in Wonderland	1	Yes		
Coach	5	Yes		
Cops	5	Yes		
Empty Nest	5	Yes		
Family Matters	4	Yes		
Garfield and Friends	5	Yes		
Major Dad	4	No	Cable syndication on USA Network.	
Parker Lewis Can't Lose	3	No	Cable syndication on USA Network.	
Rescue 911	4	Yes		
Wings	4	Yes	Cable syndication on USA Network.	

=== Network changes ===
Show	Moved from	Moved to
Captain Planet and the Planeteers	TBS	TBS/Cartoon Network
Secret Squirrel	NBC	TBS/Cartoon Network
Beakman's World	first-run syndication	CBS
Getting By	ABC	NBC
Silk Stalkings	CBS	USA Network

=== Made-for-TV movies and miniseries ===
Premiere date	Title	Channel
February 22	Babylon 5	PTEN
March 1	Bloodlines: Murder in the Family	NBC
April 4	Diana: Her True Story	NBC
April 18–20	The Fire Next Time	CBS
May 3–4	Murder in the Heartland	ABC
May 9–10	The Tommyknockers	ABC
May 23	Torch Song	NBC
May 24	Triumph Over Disaster: The Hurricane Andrew Story	NBC
May 26	Without Warning: Terror in the Towers	NBC
September 12	seaQuest DSV	NBC
September 12	Sherlock Holmes Returns	CBS
September 20	Danielle Steel's Star	NBC
October 17–19	Danielle Steel's Message from Nam	NBC
November 8	Victim of Love: The Shannon Mohr Story	NBC
December	Out There	Comedy Central
December 6	Gypsy: A Musical Fable	CBS
December 23	A Cool Like That Christmas	Fox

== Networks and services ==
=== Launches ===
Network	Type	Launch date	Notes	Source
Daystar Television Network	Cable television	Unknown		
National Empowerment Television	Cable television	Unknown		
Prime Time Entertainment Network	Cable and satellite	January 20		
Z Music Television	Cable television	March 1		
Cable Health Club	Cable television	August 31		
ESPN2	Cable television	October 1		
NewSport	Cable and satellite	October 1		
America's Collectibles Network	Cable television	October 15		
La Cadena Deportiva Prime Ticket	Cable television	November 1		
TV Food Network	Cable television	November 23		
Network One	Cable television	December 1		

=== Conversions and rebrandings ===
Old network name	New network name	Type	Conversion Date	Notes	Source
ACIS-VISN	Faith & Values Channel	Cable and satellite	Unknown		

=== Closures ===
Network	Type	Closure date	Notes	Source
CNN Checkout Channel	Satellite television	March 31		
SportsChannel America	Cable and satellite	October 1		

== Television stations ==
=== Station launches ===
Date	City of License/Market	Station	Channel	Affiliation	Notes/Ref.
January	Jellico/Knoxville, Tennessee	WPMC	54	HSN	
January 8	Billings, Montana	KSVI	6	ABC	
February 14	Jasper, Indiana	W27BG	27	Independent	
February 19	Grand Island, Nebraska	KTVG	17	Fox	
March 12	Buffalo, New York	WNGS-TV	67	Independent	
March 19	Lake Havasu City, Arizona	K27EC	27	Cornerstone TV	
April 26	Newton, New Jersey	WMBC-TV	63	FamilyNet/Main Street TV	
May 21	Palm Beach, Florida	WFGC	61	CTN	
June 7	Providence, Rhode Island	W23AS	23	Independent	
June 15	Wailuku, Hawaii	KWHM	21	Independent	
September 3	Buffalo, New York	W56DS	56	The Box	
September 15	Dallas-Fort Worth, Texas	KMPX	29	Daystar	
November 3	Houston, Texas	KNWS-TV	51	Independent	
November 10	Boise, Idaho	K66EV	66	unknown	
November 17	Bend, Oregon	K39DU	39	Fox	Translator of KPDX/Portland, Oregon
November 19	Boise, Idaho	K49GX	49	Independent	
December 9	Watertown, New York	W66CH	66	America One	
Unknown date	Detroit, Michigan	W44AR	44	Independent	
Unknown date	Eugene, Oregon	K53EA	53	The Box	
Unknown date	New York City	W23BA	23	Independent	
Unknown date	Quincy, Illinois (Hannibal, Missouri/Keokuk, Iowa)	CGEM	(cable-only)	Fox	

=== Station closures ===
Date	City of license/Market	Station	Channel	Affiliation	Sign-on date	Notes
April 5	Albuquerque, New Mexico	KGSW-TV	14	Fox	April 26, 1981	
September 19	Wenatchee, Washington	KCWT	27	TBN	June 29, 1984	

== Births ==
Date	Name	Notability
January 4	Aaryn Doyle	Canadian voice actress (The Save-Ums!) and singer
January 5	Franz Drameh	English actor (Legends of Tomorrow)
January 7	Darby Allin	Pro wrestler (AEW)
January 9	Ashley Argota	Actress (True Jackson, VP, Bucket & Skinner's Epic Adventures, Lab Rats, The Fosters)
January 12	Zayn Malik	Singer (One Direction)
January 13	Tyler Barnhardt	Actor
January 14	Matthew Timmons	Actor (The Suite Life on Deck)
January 15	Tyler Alexander Mann	Voice actor (Carl on Phineas and Ferb)
January 18	Morgan York	Actress (Hannah Montana)
January 19	Dani Thorne	Actress
January 27	Jon Kent Ethridge	Actor (Out of Jimmy's Head)
February 3	Brandon Micheal Hall	Actor
February 6	Tinashe	Actress (Out of Jimmy's Head, Two and a Half Men) and singer
February 7	David Dorfman	Actor
February 12	Jennifer Stone	Actress (Wizards of Waverly Place, Deadtime Stories)
February 12	Taylor Dearden	Actress
February 13	Alex Sawyer	British actor (House of Anubis)
February 14	Shane Harper	Actor (Good Luck Charlie, Awkward)
February 14	Alberto Rosende	Actor (Shadowhunters)
February 17	Philip Wiegratz	German actor
February 19	Victoria Justice	Actress (Zoey 101, Victorious, Eye Candy) and singer
February 23	Christina Kirkman	Actress (All That)
February 26	Taylor Dooley	Actress
March 4	Jenna Boyd	Actress
March 4	Bobbi Kristina Brown	Actress (The Houstons: On Our Own) (d. 2015)
March 4	Abigail Mavity	Actress (Zeke and Luther)
March 21	Suraj Sharma	Actor
March 23	Spencer Lord	Actor
March 29	Joe Adler	Actor
April 4	Daniela Bobadilla	Actress
April 10	Sofia Carson	Actress (Descendants) and singer
April 14	Ellington Ratliff	Actor and drummer (R5)
April 14	Graham Phillips	Actor (The Good Wife)
April 14	Vivien Cardone	Actress (Everwood)
April 15	Madeleine Martin	Actress (JoJo's Circus, Californication, Adventure Time)
April 16	Chance the Rapper	American hip hop
April 18	Nathan Sykes	British singer (The Wanted)
April 19	Sebastian de Souza	English actor (Skins, Recovery Road)
April 23	Brooke Palsson	Actress (Between)
May 6	Naomi Scott	English actress
May 10	Halston Sage	Actress (How to Rock, Crisis)
May 10	Spencer Fox	Voice actor (Kim Possible)
May 11	Annabelle Attanasio	Actress
May 11	Olivia Liang	Actress (Kung Fu)
May 13	Debby Ryan	Actress (Barney & Friends, The Suite Life on Deck, Jessie, The Mysteries of Laura, Insatiable) and singer
May 13	Cyn	Singer
May 14	Miranda Cosgrove	Actress (Drake & Josh, iCarly, Crowded) and singer
May 24	Bobby Lockwood	English actor (House of Anubis)
May 24	Oliver Davis	Actor (ER, Rodney)
May 29	Maika Monroe	Actress
June 6	Jesse Carere	Actor (Between, Finding Carter)
June 7	Amanda Leighton	Actress (The Fosters, The Powerpuff Girls, Trolls: The Beat Goes On!, Amphibia)
June 7	Jordan Fry	Actor
June 9	Danielle Chuchran	Actress
June 14	Ryan McCartan	Actor (Liv and Maddie)
June 26	Ariana Grande	Actress and singer (Victorious, Sam & Cat, Scream Queens)
June 29	Lorenzo James Henrie	Actor (Fear the Walking Dead)
July 1	Raini Rodriguez	Actress (Austin & Ally)
July 7	Capital Steez	American rapper (d. 2012)
July 10	Carlon Jeffery	Actor (A.N.T. Farm)
July 20	Alycia Debnam-Carey	Australian actress (The 100, Fear the Walking Dead)
July 23	Lili Simmons	Actress (Banshee, Hawaii Five-0, The Purge)
July 26	Taylor Momsen	Actress and singer (Gossip Girl)
July 26	Elizabeth Gillies	Actress (Victorious, Dynasty) and singer
July 26	Chrysti Ane	Brazilian actress (Power Rangers Ninja Steel)
July 28	Sammy Guevara	Pro wrestler
July 28	Cher Lloyd	English singer
July 28	La'Porsha Renae	Singer (American Idol)
August 1	Leon Thomas III	Actor (The Backyardigans, Victorious, Insecure)
August 2	Cassidy Gifford	Actress
August 2	Joivan Wade	English actor (Youngers, Doom Patrol)
August 7	Francesca Eastwood	Actress (Mrs. Eastwood & Company) and daughter of Clint Eastwood
August 8	Stella Baker	Actress
August 9	Rydel Lynch	Actress and singer (R5)
August 11	Alyson Stoner	Actress (Mike's Super Short Show, The Suite Life of Zack & Cody), voice actress (Lilo & Stitch: The Series, Phineas and Ferb, Young Justice, The Legend of Korra, Milo Murphy's Law) and singer
August 11	Luke Erceg	Australian actor (Mortified)
August 12	Imani Hakim	Actress (Everybody Hates Chris)
August 13	Johnny Gaudreau	Ice hockey player (d. 2024)
August 14	Cassi Thomson	Actress (Big Love, Switched at Birth)
August 16	Cameron Monaghan	Actor (Malcolm in the Middle, Shameless, Gotham)
August 18	Maia Mitchell	Australian actress (Mortified, The Fosters, Good Trouble)
August 20	MK Nobilette	Singer (American Idol)
August 26	Keke Palmer	Actress (True Jackson, VP, Winx Club, Scream Queens, Star, Berlin Station, Scream) and singer
August 29	Liam Payne	Singer (One Direction) (d. 2024)
August 29	Lucas Cruikshank	Actor (Fred: The Show, Marvin Marvin)
September 5	Gage Golightly	Actress (The Troop, Ringer, Teen Wolf, Red Oaks)
September 7	Taylor Gray	Actor (Bucket & Skinner's Epic Adventures, Star Wars Rebels)
September 9	Lexis King	Pro wrestler and son of Brian Pillman
September 9	Charlie Stewart	Actor (Life with Bonnie, The Suite Life of Zack & Cody)
September 12	Kelsea Ballerini	Singer (Greatest Hits, The Voice, CMT Music Awards)
September 13	Niall Horan	Singer (One Direction)
September 13	Aisha Dee	Australian actress (The Saddle Club, I Hate My Teenage Daughter, Chasing Life, The Bold Type)
September 18	Patrick Schwarzenegger	Actor and son of Arnold Schwarzenegger
September 21	Aliocha Schneider	French-Canadian actor
September 22	Carlos Knight	Actor (Supah Ninjas)
September 24	Sonya Deville	Pro wrestler and contestant on Tough Enough
September 24	Ben Platt	Actor
September 25	Zach Tyler Eisen	Voice actor (Little Bill, The Backyardigans, Avatar: The Last Airbender)
October 2	Elizabeth McLaughlin	Actress (First Day, Betrayal, Hand of God)
October 2	Tara Lynne Barr	Actress (Aquarius)
October 8	Angus T. Jones	Actor (Two and a Half Men)
October 8	Molly Quinn	Actress (Winx Club, Castle)
October 9	Autumn Chiklis	Actress
October 9	Scotty McCreery	Singer (American Idol)
October 11	Brandon Flynn	Actor (13 Reasons Why)
October 14	Charlie Kirk	Political commentator (Fox News, Real America's Voice) (d. 2025)
October 19	Hunter King	Actress (The Young and the Restless)
October 23	Taylor Spreitler	Actress (Days of Our Lives, Melissa & Joey)
October 25	Zeno Robinson	Actor (The Owl House, Craig of the Creek, Ben 10)
October 27	Troy Gentile	Actor (The Goldbergs)
October 29	India Eisley	Actress (The Secret Life of the American Teenager)
November 1	Dillon Lane	Actor (Bucket & Skinner's Epic Adventures)
November 6	Jak Knight	Actor, comedian and writer (Big Mouth, Bust Down) (d. 2022)
November 14	Matthew Levy	Actor (Sons of Tucson)
November 16	Pete Davidson	Actor (Wild 'n Out, Guy Code, Failosophy, Saturday Night Live)
November 22	Nathan McLeod	Canadian actor (Life with Boys)
November 24	Zoe Levin	Actress
November 27	Aubrey Peeples	Actress (Nashville) and singer
November 28	Bryshere Y. Gray	Actor (Empire) and rapper
November 29	David Lambert	Actor (Aaron Stone, The Fosters)
December 8	AnnaSophia Robb	Actress (The Carrie Diaries, Mercy Street)
December 11	Nesta Cooper	Actress
December 17	Kiersey Clemons	Actress
December 21	Jinger Vuolo	Actress (19 Kids and Counting, Counting On) and television personality
December 22	Aliana Lohan	Actress (The Parent Trap, Living Lohan) and daughter of Michael Lohan and Dina Lohan
December 22	Meghan Trainor	American singer
December 23	Caleb Foote	Actor (The Kids Are Alright)
December 27	Olivia Cooke	Actress (Bates Motel)

== Deaths ==
Date	Name	Age	Notability
January 27	André the Giant	46	Wrestler (WrestleMania)
March 6	Douglas Marland	58	Writer (As the World Turns)
March 17	Helen Hayes	92	Actress (The Snoop Sisters)
March 31	Brandon Lee	28	Actor
April 1	Jerry Hausner	83	Actor (Jerry the agent on I Love Lucy, voice of Waldo in Mr. Magoo cartoons)
April 3	Pinky Lee	85	Comedian (The Gumby Show)
June 11	Ray Sharkey	40	Actor (Wiseguy)
June 22	Pat Nixon	81	First Lady of the United States and spouse of President Richard Nixon
June 30	George McFarland	64	Actor (Our Gang)
July 2	Fred Gwynne	66	Actor (Herman on The Munsters, Muldoon on Car 54, Where Are You?)
August 4	Bernard Barrow	65	Actor (Johnny Ryan on Ryan's Hope, Inspector Roy Palmer on Serpico, Leighton Siddley on Rachel, Rachel)
August 16	Tom Fuccello	56	Actor (Dave Culver on Dallas)
September 4	Hervé Villechaize	50	Actor (Tattoo on Fantasy Island)
September 12	Raymond Burr	76	Actor (Perry Mason, Ironside)
October 12	Leon Ames	91	Actor (Mister Ed)
October 25	Vincent Price	82	Actor (The Hilarious House of Frightenstein, Hollywood Squares, Batman)
October 31	River Phoenix	23	Actor (Seven Brides for Seven Brothers)
November 21	Bill Bixby	59	Actor (My Favorite Martian, The Courtship of Eddie's Father, The Incredible Hulk), director, producer
November 28	Garry Moore	78	Game show host and Television personality (I've Got a Secret)
December 16	Moses Gunn	64	Actor (Good Times)
December 22	Don DeFore	80	Actor (Erskin "Thorny" Thornberry on The Adventures of Ozzie and Harriet, George "Mr. B." Baxter on Hazel)

== See also ==
- 1993 in the United States
- List of American films of 1993
