= Michael Lohan =

American television personality

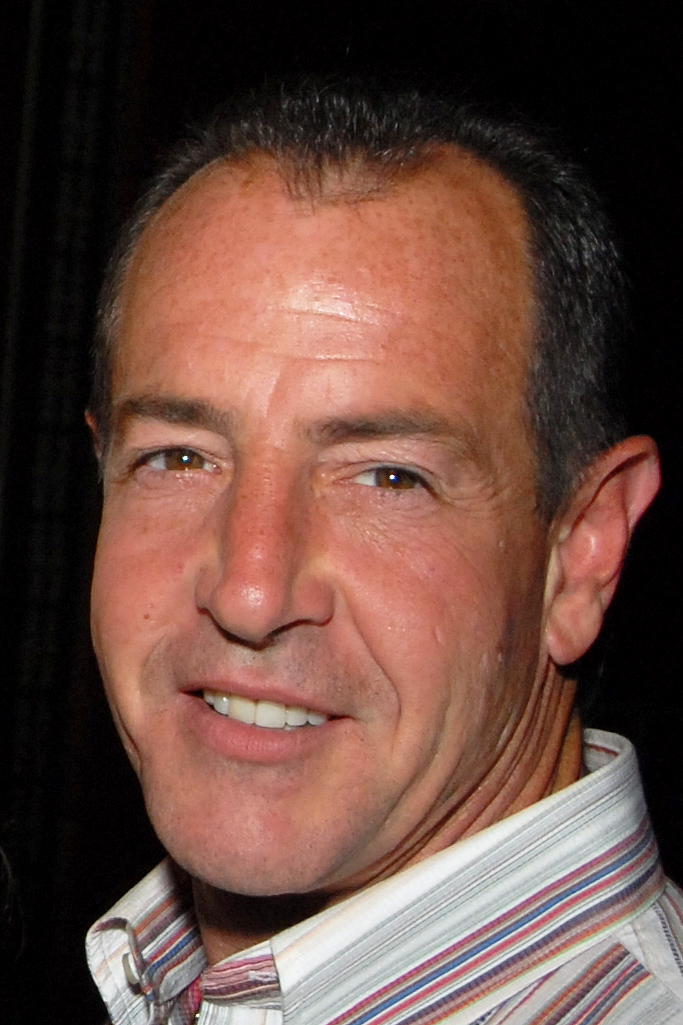
- Lohan at the wrap party for the pilot of Wanna Be Me in 2008
- Born: Michael John Lohan; April 25, 1960 (age 66); Syosset, New York, U.S.
- Occupation: Television personality
- Years active: 2008–present
- Spouses: Dina Sullivan (m. 1985; div. 2007) Kate Major (m. 2014; sep. 2015)
- Children: 7, including Lindsay and Aliana Lohan

Michael John Lohan (LOH-han; born April 25, 1960) is an American television personality, best known as the father of actress Lindsay Lohan.

== Early life ==
Michael Lohan is the oldest of four children born to Marilyn (née Desiderio; 1942–2020) and Richard Lohan (1937–2008). He has Irish and Italian ancestry.

== Career ==
At age 20, Lohan became a clerk on the floor of the commodity exchange.

As of 2021, Lohan co-hosts a weekly radio show covering topics of addiction recovery on KPRC 950 AM in Houston, Texas.

== Personal life ==
Lohan married Dina, a former singer and dancer, on November 2, 1985. Dina and Michael Lohan have four children: daughters Lindsay (born July 2, 1986) and Aliana (born December 22, 1993), and sons Michael Jr. (born 1987) and Dakota "Cody" (born June 16, 1996). The parents separated when their daughter Lindsay was three, and later reunited. Dina filed for divorce on January 18, 2005. In August 2007, the former couple announced a final divorce settlement had been reached, with the divorce scheduled to be finalized three months later. Dina was granted custody of their two youngest children, Ali and Cody.

On June 30, 2008, Lohan submitted a DNA sample for a paternity test after a Montana massage therapist, Kristi Kaufmann Horn, stated she was intimately involved with Michael in 1995 while he was separated from Dina, and fathered her daughter, Ashley Horn (b. 1995). The paternity results were revealed as positive during his appearance on Trisha where Lohan reunited with Kaufmann while meeting Horn for the first time.

Lohan and former tabloid reporter Kate Major became engaged over Easter weekend in 2010. They later broke up, but their continued relationship, which was marked by conflict, was depicted in the fifth season of the VH1 reality television series Celebrity Rehab with Dr. Drew. The season documented Lohan's rehabilitation for alcoholism, a struggle he stated began in 1982. Lohan stated that although he had not used cocaine in six years at the time—a "culture" to which he said he succumbed while working on Wall Street—"Drinking always led to coke. Always." He also discussed how he was affected by the verbal abuse and alcoholism of his father, who had recently died of stomach cancer.

It was revealed on Celebrity Rehab that Lohan had been diagnosed with left main cardiac disease. Although Lohan had previously experienced a blockage in his right coronary artery, the blockage in his left main coronary artery placed him at high risk for a cardiac event and required him to avoid stress and anger.

In 2011, Lohan lived in West Hollywood, California. As of February 2014, Lohan lived in Boca Raton, Florida, with Kate Major, whom he later married in October 2014. They have two sons: Landon (born January 2013) and Logan (born December 2014). Prior to moving to Boca Raton, Lohan lived in Fort Lauderdale and at the Tahitian Inn in Tampa.

Lohan and his wife lost custody of both their children in November 2015. In December 2015, Kate filed for legal separation from Lohan.

In June 2022, Lohan moved to the Houston, Texas, area.

== Legal issues ==
In 1990, Lohan was investigated for insider trading and convicted of criminal contempt of court. He was incarcerated for three years in Nassau County, and was released in 1993 on five years' probation. During this time, his daughter Lindsay had started modeling for the Ford Models agency and was starring in commercials.

In 1997, Lohan was arrested when he violated his probation after flying to Napa, California to visit Lindsay, who had been hospitalized for an asthma attack that occurred during the filming of The Parent Trap. He subsequently served a year in prison.

After Lindsay became a movie star, tensions arose in the family. This conflict came to a head on May 23, 2004 when he and Dina's youngest brother, Matt Sullivan, got into a fistfight outside Lohan’s Long Island home during a first communion party for their son Dakota. Lohan was charged with attempted assault and, while awaiting sentencing, was involved in a car accident that led to his being charged with driving under the influence of alcohol and aggravated unlicensed operation of a motor vehicle. While in prison, he took up singing and songwriting, as well as correspondence courses for Teen Challenge, a faith-based sobriety program. Michael and Dina Lohan separated again later that year. Lohan was later arrested on June 29 after allegedly leaving a Long Island hotel where he had rented several suites without paying his $3,800 bill, and faced assault charges in Manhattan for allegedly swearing at a sanitation worker and punching the worker in the face after the worker's truck blocked his car. On January 19, 2005, Dina's spokesperson confirmed that she had filed for divorce.

Lohan was released from prison in March 2007 after serving a two-and-a-half-year sentence in the Collins Correctional Facility. He subsequently took up residence in a Teen Challenge center in West Babylon, New York, and underwent training to become a minister, though to be ordained requires his parole to end.

He subsequently worked as an actor and counselor with the Long Island Teen Challenge rehabilitation program. He has also been involved in various television proposals, including the Michael Lohan Reality Project, a 2007 series produced by Frozen Pictures, which followed his life, work and efforts to reconnect with his daughter and family.

On October 25, 2011, Lohan was arrested in a suspected domestic violence incident in Tampa, Florida, involving his on-again, off-again girlfriend, Kate Major. Lohan was released from custody on $5,000 bail and ordered to have no further contact with Major. On October 27, 2011, he was again in police custody after contacting Major by phone. After being subsequently released from a Tampa hospital October 28, 2011, and taken to Falkenburg Road Jail, Lohan was denied bail the next day.

In April 2021, Lohan was arrested in Palm Beach County for illegal patient brokering stemming from illegal kickbacks he was alleged to have received by steering people towards specific treatment centers he was affiliated with. He was later convicted and in June 2022 sentenced to four years of probation. In March 2025, Lohan was arrested for violating this probation.

In February 2025, Lohan was arrested for felony assault after alleging flipping his estranged wife, Kate Major, out of a chair during a confrontation.

== Filmography ==
=== Film ===
Year	Title	Character
2008	Horrorween	Chindows Exec
2008	The Deed To Hell	Interviewed Celebrity
2011	Wanna Be Me!	Angel Lohan

=== Television ===
All television appearances are of self.

Year	Title	Episode
2009	The Real Housewives of Atlanta	1 episode
2010	Hannity	July 8, 2010
2010	Larry King Live	July 20, 2010
2010	The Gossip Queens	1.22
2011	Celebrity Rehab with Dr. Drew	10 episodes
2011	The Early Show	January 3, 2011
2011	ABC News Nightline	February 17, 2011
2012	Sergio's Blog	Celebrity Boxing 36: Michelle 'Bombshell' Mcgee
2012	Dr. Drew's Lifechangers	Michael Lohan Part 2
2012	Judge Alex	November 2, 2012
2012	Celebridate	Michael Lohan
2013	The Test	The Lohans Revealed
2012/2013	Trisha	Liars Exposed! Are You Cheating and Stealing from Me?/Michael Lohan; Trisha Exclusive: Is Lindsay Lohan My Sister?
2014	Lindsay	Part Two
2016	Family Therapy with Dr. Jenn	10 episodes
