= Living Lohan =

- Living Lohan opening title
- Genre: Reality
- Developed by: Mary-Ellis Bunim; Jonathan Murray
- Starring: Dina Lohan; Aliana Lohan; Dakota "Cody" Lohan; Ann "Nana" Sullivan; Michael Lohan Jr.; Alexis Armonas; Jeremy Greene
- Country of origin: United States
- Original language: English
- No. of seasons: 1
- No. of episodes: 9

Production
- Executive producers: Andrew Jameson; Jeff Jenkins; Laura Korkoian; Phil Maloof; Jonathan Murray; Gavin Maloof; Dina Lohan
- Production locations: North Merrick, NY; Long Island, NY; Las Vegas, NV
- Camera setup: Single camera
- Running time: 22 minutes
- Production companies: Maloof Television; Bunim/Murray Productions

Original release
- Network: E!
- Release: May 26 – July 27, 2008

Living Lohan is an American reality television series that debuted on E!. It premiered on May 26, 2008 and ended on July 27, 2008, with a total of 9 episodes over the course of one season.

== Synopsis ==
The program documents the daily lives of Lindsay Lohan's family, with most of the focus on her mother and manager Dina and younger sister Aliana's attempt to break into show business. Also appearing are brother Dakota "Cody" Lohan, grandmother Ann "Nana" Sullivan, who is Dina's mother and a former radio actress, and Jeremy Greene, a music producer helping Aliana with her debut album. Lindsay did not participate in the series.

According to Dina, the series did not air a second season because producers "wanted us to do these crazy things, like my son cheating on his girlfriend, me faking a pregnancy. I was like, 'No, no, no! They had ideas that weren't conducive to our ideas."

== Critical reception ==
Gillian Flynn of Entertainment Weekly graded the show F and commented, "The irritation turned to repulsion around the first minute ... Dina snipes about the paparazzi's invasion of privacy, but thanks to her, there's not much left to invade."

Troy Patterson of Slate magazine said, "The show is crisply edited and tangily ironic without pushing its points too hard .... Living Lohan is not just a symptom of cultural decay but an active agent of it, commodifying the very youth and soul of Ali Lohan—younger sister of poor little Lindsay ... Living Lohan is one big exploitative mess."

Mark A. Perigard of the Boston Herald graded the show D and said, "Living Lohan scrapes the bottom of the stupidity barrel."

Brian Lowry of Variety said, "It's a tedious exercise, joining E!'s Keeping Up with the Kardashians in the realm of mother-daughter bonding experiences, with limited appeal beyond, perhaps appropriately, those pesky tabloids for which the featured "talent" profess disdain... The show at times provides unintended comedy, representing E!'s best hope of transforming Living Lohan into a guilty pleasure, if not for the reasons Dina (who doubles as a producer) would doubtless like... the most salient aspect of the series is that it's profoundly boring, wringing out sprinkles of drama as best it can."

While on Live with Regis and Kelly, Anderson Cooper bashed the show during the opening segment of the chat show. Kelly Ripa proceeds to show Cooper what the show is about. Video of Cooper's comments was placed in the "Top 20 Best Clips of the Year" by The Soup when he stated "I cannot believe I'm wasting a minute of my life watching these horrific people."

== Episodes ==
No.	Title	Original release date
1	"Mommy Will Fix It"	May 26, 2008
Dina reads the tabloids about her daughters Lindsay and Ali; Ali and her new music producer, Jeremy Greene, talk about how to approach her new album; Dina reads an article that said there is a sex tape of Lindsay on the internet; Jeremy causes controversy over an interview; it is announced that Ali will record her new album at The Palms Casino in Las Vegas, which is owned by Gavin and Phil Maloof, executive producers of Living Lohan.
2	"Burning Down the House"	June 1, 2008
Dina and Ali accuse Jeremy of being less than truthful during an interview; Dina makes a guest appearance at the anniversary party of Boulevard Magazine, in which she was featured in October 2006. Beginning with this episode, the series moved to its normal Sunday night timeslot.
3	"Mean Girls"	June 8, 2008
After Ali gets harassed at school, Dina takes her to an IMPACT meeting; Dina coaches Ali on how to handle reporters in preparation for her Access Hollywood interview.
4	"Like Mother, Like Daughter"	June 15, 2008
Ali wants a puppy to take care of on her own while they own 3 dogs and are dog sitting Lindsay's 2 dogs. She demands for another, so Dina tells that she can't have one, but at end she, gets what she wants; Michael Jr. comes home from college with his girlfriend, and when she wants to leave early, it leads to an argument.
5	"Grandma Won't Budge"	June 22, 2008
As the family begins to move to Las Vegas, so Ali can jump-start her recording career, Nana begins to tell why she doesn't want to move. Michael Jr. fixes his issues with Nina.
6	"Moving to Las Vegas!"	June 29, 2008
The Lohan family moves to Las Vegas so Ali can begin recording her new album. Ali has trouble on her first day of recording. Cody and Dina spend some one-on-one time together.
7	"The Billionaire Babysitters"	July 13, 2008
Ali comes to a decision that she doesn't want to collaborate with Jeremy on her new album.
8	"Show Girls"	July 20, 2008
Dina meets choreographer, Jonnis and performs at The Palms; Ali completes her album and the family returns home.
9	"Acting Up"	July 27, 2008
While Cody and Nina battle it out for Michael's affection, Ali is faced with the challenging task of auditioning for the producers of a Hollywood film.

== Home releases ==
The show was released on DVD in Australia by Shock Records on March 28, 2009.

== "All the Way Around" ==
"All the Way Around"

Single by Aliana Lohan
- Released: July 14, 2008
- Recorded: 2008
- Genre: Pop, R&B
- Length: 3:43
- Label: Interscope Records
- Songwriter: Kara DioGuardi
- Producer: Emanuel "Eman" Kiriakou

Aliana Lohan singles chronology
"Christmas Magic" / "Rockin' Around the Christmas Tree" (2006)	"All the Way Around" (2008)

"All the Way Around" is a single performed by American pop recording artist Aliana Lohan. The song was showing during the "Show Girls" episode, even though snippets of the song were played throughout the run of the series. It was released digitally on July 14, 2008. "All the Way Around" reached #75 on the Hot Digital Songs chart.

=== Background ===
The single, which was recorded in Las Vegas and Los Angeles, was produced by Emanuel "Eman" Kiriakou and written by Kara DioGuardi. This was the first single to be released through upstart Maloof Music and distributed through Interscope Records.

=== Charts ===
Chart (2011)	Peak position
US Billboard Bubbling Under Hot 100 Singles	11

=== Release history ===
Country	Date	Format	Label
United States	July 14, 2008	CD single, digital download	Maloof Music / Interscope Records
Worldwide	July 14, 2008	CD single, digital download	Interscope Records
