= History of WWE Raw =

History of the WWE professional wrestling television show Raw

The history of WWE Raw began as WWF's Monday Night Raw on January 11, 1993. Over the next two decades, Raw would become the promotion's flagship show, achieving numerous milestones along the way.

== Premiere and early years (1993–1999) ==
The first Raw logo used in The New Generation Era between January 11, 1993 to March 3, 1997

The program first aired on January 11, 1993, on the USA Network as a replacement for Prime Time Wrestling, which aired on the network for eight years. The original Raw was sixty minutes in length and broke new ground in televised professional wrestling. Traditionally, wrestling shows were pre-taped on sound stages with small audiences or at large arena shows. The Raw formula was considerably different from the pre-taped weekend shows that aired at the time such as Superstars and Wrestling Challenge. Instead of matches taped weeks in advance with studio voice overs and taped discussion, Raw was a show shot and aired to a live audience, with angles and matches playing out as they happened.

Vince McMahon, Randy Savage and Rob Bartlett were the original hosts of the show, as well as serving as traditional commentators. Bartlett, a comedian who previously had nothing to do with the wrestling industry, would be replaced by Bobby Heenan in April 1993. Heenan left the WWF in December 1993 to join WCW, and left McMahon and Savage to host the show alone, before Savage too would leave the WWF for WCW in October 1994, leaving McMahon with several different co-hosts each week including Shawn Michaels and Jim Cornette. Jerry Lawler would become McMahon's permanent co-host on April 10, 1995. In 1997, Jim Ross would take over for Vince McMahon as RAW's play-by-play commentator. Ross and Lawler worked as a regular team until 2008, when Michael Cole was moved to this role after being drafted to Raw. On December 29, 2014 Booker T replaced Lawler on commentary for Raw following Lawler's hospitalization for diverticulitis. On June 8, 2015, Byron Saxton would be replace Booker T as a permanent co-host for Raw following Booker T's filming Tough Enough, along with Michael Cole and John "Bradshaw" Layfield, who joined Raw as a color analyst on April 1, 2013, making Raw announce team consist of Cole, Layfield and Saxton. Corey Graves would later replace JBL.

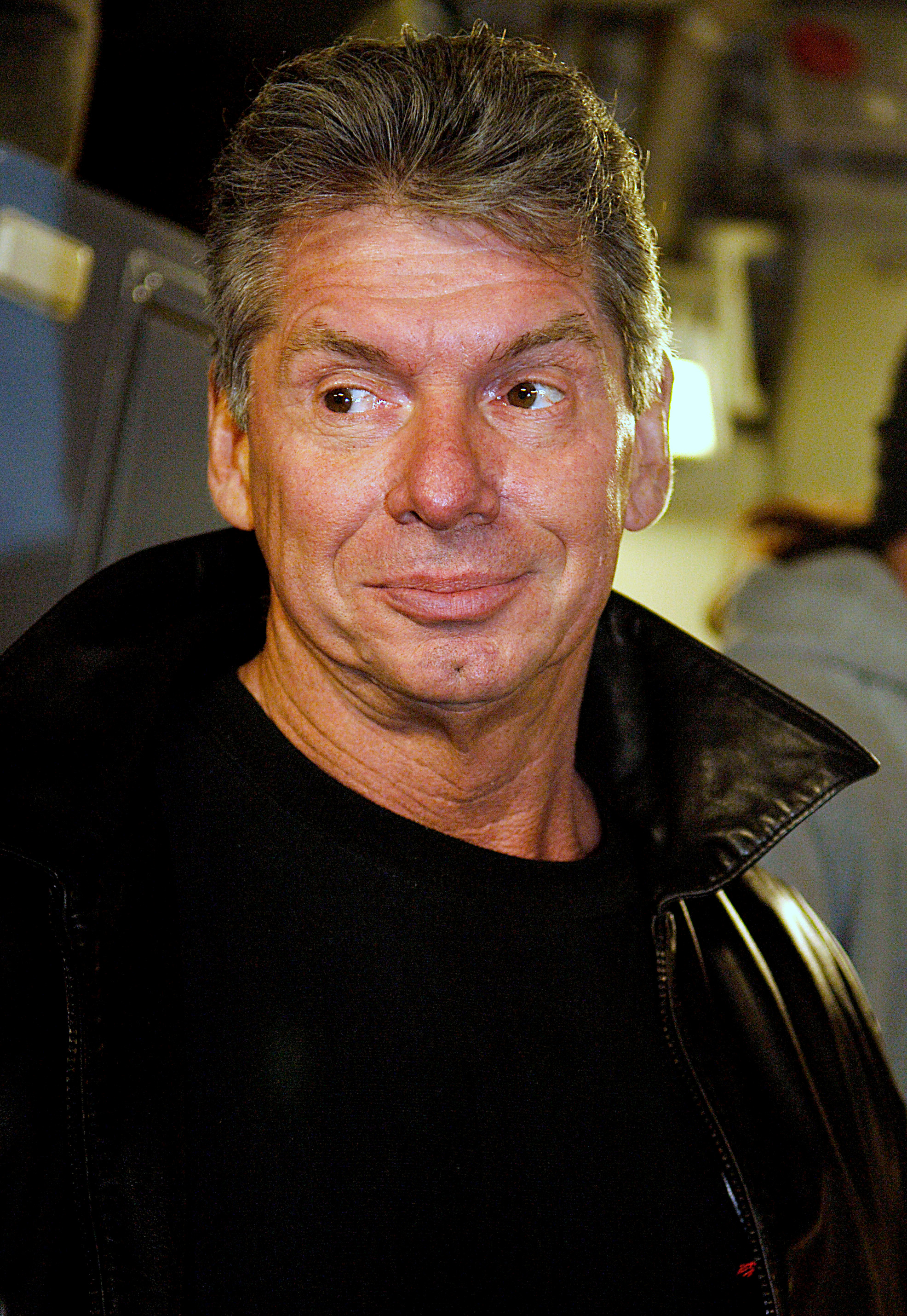
Vince McMahon, the owner and chairman of WWF (now WWE) and creator of Raw, also served as an announcer until 1997

Raw originated from the Grand Ballroom at the Manhattan Center, a small New York City theater, and aired live each week. The combination of an intimate venue and live action proved to be a successful improvement. However, the weekly live schedule proved to be a financial drain on the WWF. From spring 1993 until spring 1997, Raw would tape several weeks worth of episodes after a live episode had aired. The WWF taped several weeks worth of Raw from the Mid-Hudson Civic Center in Poughkeepsie, New York in April 1993, and again in June and October (from 1984 to 1986, the Civic Center was the home of another WWF television show, Championship Wrestling). The first episode produced outside of New York was taped in Bushkill, Pennsylvania in November 1993 and Raw left the Manhattan Center permanently as the show would be taken on the road and hosted in smaller venues throughout the United States.

Raw, uniquely in its day, featured some competitive matches between upper level talent such as The Undertaker, Bret Hart, Rick Martel, Mr. Perfect, Lex Luger, "The Million Dollar Man" Ted DiBiase, Irwin R. Schyster, Razor Ramon, Shawn Michaels, Doink the Clown, Yokozuna, Marty Jannetty and The 1–2–3 Kid in its early years. Up until that point, unless it was part of an ongoing feud or a title match, most matches on nationally televised WWF programs were primarily "squash" matches (which were featured on Raw early on as well). Only Saturday Night's Main Event and The Main Event generally featured the type of competitive matches Raw had, though unlike Raw, those two programs were run infrequently. Huge storyline-developing matches were regularly featured, such as Ric Flair vs. Mr. Perfect in January 1993; this would be Flair's last appearance in the company for almost 9 years. Also, The 1–2–3 Kid's upset victory over Razor Ramon in May 1993 would result in The Kid becoming an upper roster mainstay for years to come.

=== The Monday Night War and Raw Is War (1995–1999) ===
"RAW is WAR" logo used from March 10, 1997 to October 1, 2001

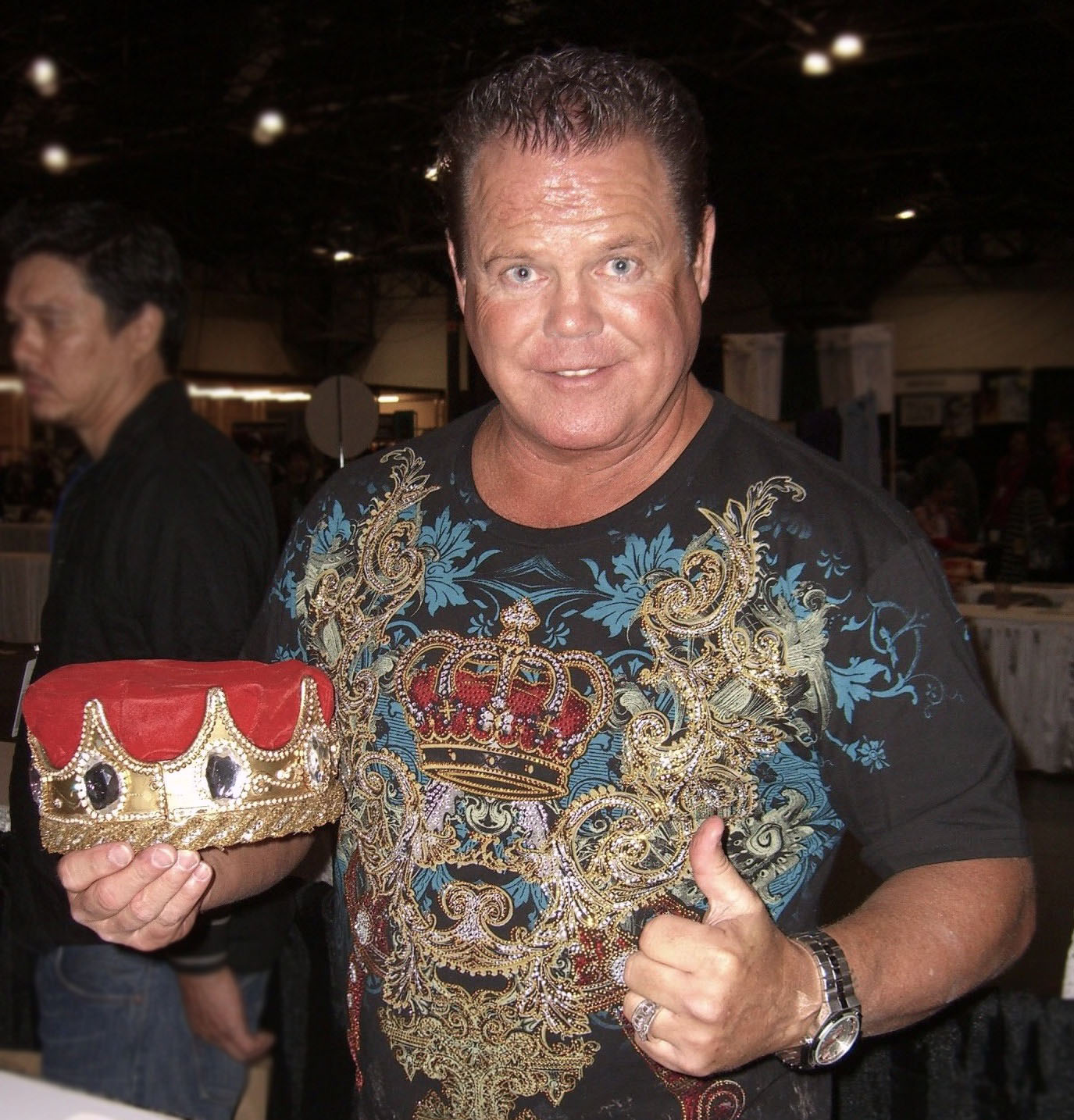
Jerry Lawler, who was the longtime color commentator of Raw since April 10, 1995 until December 29, 2014, left Raw to join the SmackDown broadcast team on January 15, 2015, during its move to Thursday nights on Syfy

On September 4, 1995, the WWF's chief competitor World Championship Wrestling (WCW) began airing its new wrestling show, Monday Nitro, live each week on TNT. Raw and Nitro went head-to-head for the first time on September 11, 1995. Nitro was transmitted live on television, and due to Raw still being pre-recorded on certain weeks, Nitro play-by-play voice Eric Bischoff, who also was WCW's vice president at the time, would frequently give away the results of WWF's pre-taped Raw shows on the live WCW show. Some fans also looked at Raw taping results on the steadily growing Internet; this caused the ratings of the taped Raw episodes to decrease.

At the start of the ratings war in 1995 through to mid-1996, Raw and Nitro exchanged victories over each other in a closely contested rivalry. Beginning in mid-1996, however, thanks primarily to the nWo angle, Nitro started a ratings win-streak that lasted for 84 consecutive weeks, ending on April 13, 1998. Nitro also moved to two hours from May 27, 1996, while Raw stayed at one hour up to the January 27, 1997 episode.

Controversy erupted on the November 4, 1996 episode of Raw when Brian Pillman, engaged in a feud with Stone Cold Steve Austin, pulled a gun on Austin during a home-invasion segment. Pillman was also heard shouting the word "fucking" during the segment, which, due to the live nature of that week's Raw, went uncensored. Executives at USA Network were not pleased with the episode, and forced the WWF and Pillman to apologize for the incident. Pillman was sent to a mental hospital a few days after the incident. The November 4, 1996 episode is also the first appearance of The Rock, as Rocky Maivia.

The poor rating (2.2) for the January 20, 1997 episode of Raw, the night after the Royal Rumble, caused the WWF and USA Network to increase Raw to two hours and prevent TNT's Nitro from having an unopposed hour. The WWF also decided to run Raw as a live show more often to combat Nitro, with the normal schedule being one live Raw followed by a taped episode.

On February 3, 1997, Raw went to a two-hour format, to compete with the extra hour on Nitro, as an edgier, more hostile attitude was starting to come in full stream in the WWF. In an attempt to break the momentum of what had turned into ratings domination by Nitro, Extreme Championship Wrestling (ECW) was brought in as Jerry Lawler challenged ECW on February 17, 1997. In an episode where Raw returned to the Manhattan Center, the challenge was answered with Taz, Mikey Whipwreck, Sabu, Tommy Dreamer, D-Von Dudley, and The Sandman and "ECW representative" Paul Heyman appearing and performing ECW-style matches for the WWF audience.

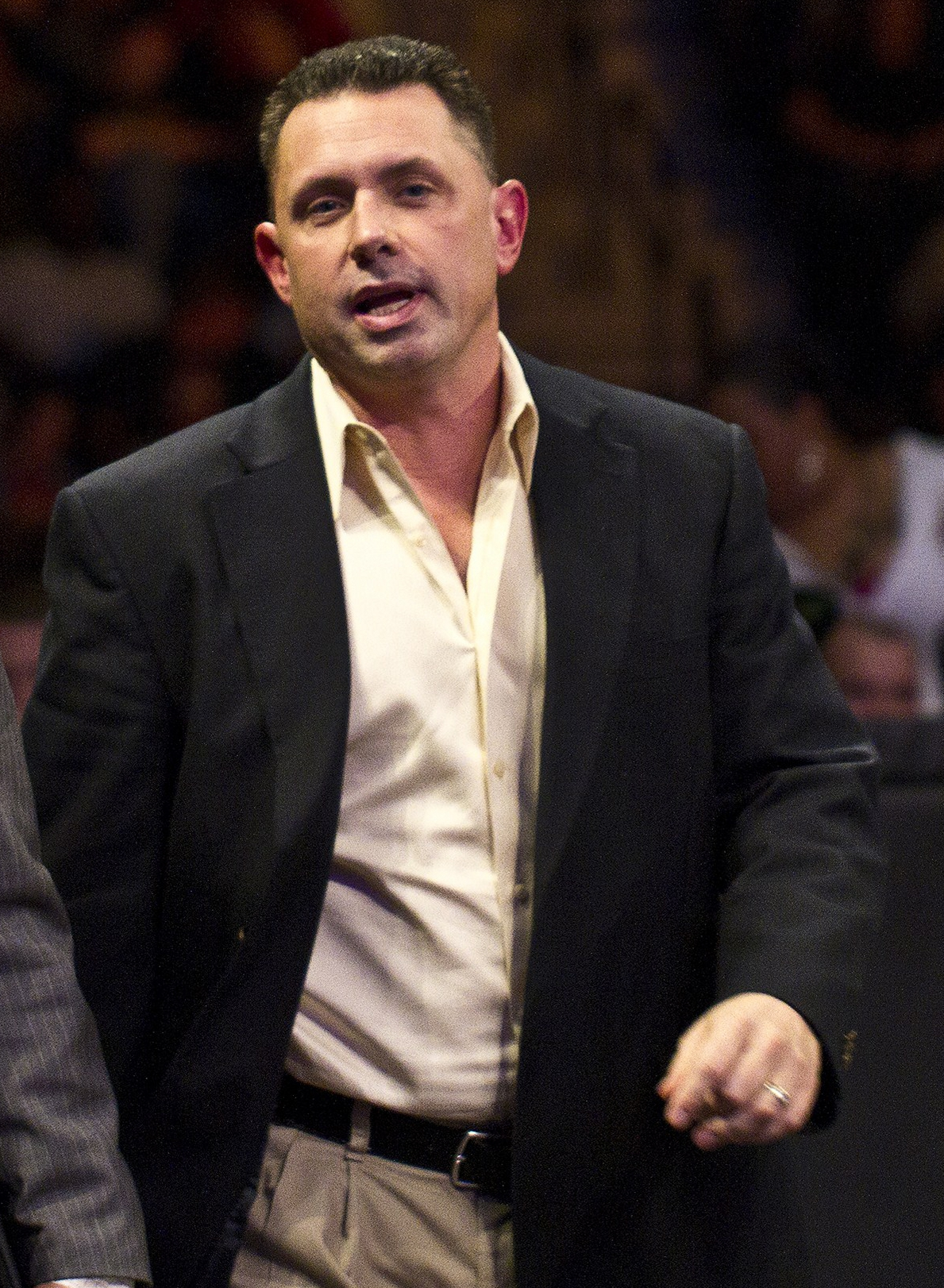
Michael Cole, the lead announcer of Raw since November 1997 until July 1998, during Raw Is War aired in the first hour, in December 1998 until April 1999, from June 30, 2008, until September 23, 2019, and since August 2023

On March 3, 1997, a house show from Berlin, Germany, which was filmed with few cameras and poor lighting and featured an array of cold matches with no storyline builds to them, aired as that week's episode of Raw. The show—notable for featuring the initial awarding of the WWF European Championship to The British Bulldog—was very poorly received by fans (earning only a 1.9 rating, one of the lowest the show has ever recorded) and WWF executives, alike (the same taping had matches that featured on the March 8 episode of Shotgun Saturday Night and March 9 episode of Superstars). The following week, Raw was completely revamped with a new set, new theme music (originally "The Beautiful People" by Marilyn Manson, later a WWF-created song), and was renamed Raw Is War. The second hour would also be rebranded as WWF War Zone and treated as a separate program for ratings purposes. The March 17, 1997 episode featured a heated Bret Hart/Vince McMahon altercation where Hart shoved McMahon to the mat and engaged in a profanity-laden tirade, much of which went uncensored. The WWF then produced its first Raw event in South Africa, although this was pre-taped in Johannesburg while at the same time aired live in Muncie, Indiana, United States, together on the April 14, 1997 episode.

Throughout 1997, further controversial elements emerged with Raw Is War and WWF programming. Notable angles included Bret Hart and his Hart Foundation declaring war on the United States lifestyle, Paul Bearer delivering an intense promo on June 30 claiming that The Undertaker's brother Kane was still alive after surviving a house fire twenty years prior and claiming that The Undertaker had started it, gang warfare between the Nation of Domination, The Disciples of Apocalypse and Los Boricuas erupting in the summer, Stone Cold Steve Austin's building feud with WWF executives, and primarily Vince McMahon (who was now known as the legit owner of the WWF), and the emergence of D-Generation X (DX) as an anti-establishment group. On November 17, Vince McMahon was interviewed by Jim Ross about the infamous Montreal Screwjob at the Survivor Series and said to the world that "Bret Hart screwed Bret Hart" and claimed that Hart was a tragic figure on that night, thus starting the Mr. McMahon gimmick. Hart had then left for WCW immediately following the Survivor Series event. Plans which were made by USA Network head Kay Koplovitz to cancel Raw after its contract with the network expired in May 1998 were prevented after media mogul Barry Diller, who was also a mentor of WWF-affiliated NBC Universal executive Bonnie Hammer, bought the network and ousted Koplovitz.

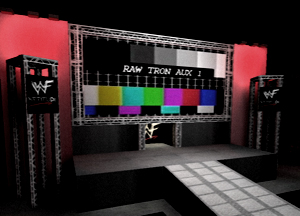
A CGI representation of the Raw Is War entrance and TitanTron as it appeared during 1999

After WrestleMania XIV in March 1998, which featured Mike Tyson as a ring enforcer, and Shawn Michaels' final match up until 2002, the WWF regained the lead in the Monday Night War with its new "WWF Attitude" brand, led in particular by rising stars Stone Cold Steve Austin, The Rock, Triple H, Mankind and an established star The Undertaker. The classic feud between the villainous WWF Chairman Mr. McMahon and fan favorite Stone Cold Steve Austin caught the interest of fans. The April 13, 1998 episode of Raw Is War, which was headlined by a match between Austin and McMahon, marked the first time that WCW had lost the head-to-head Monday night ratings battle in the 84 weeks since June 1996.

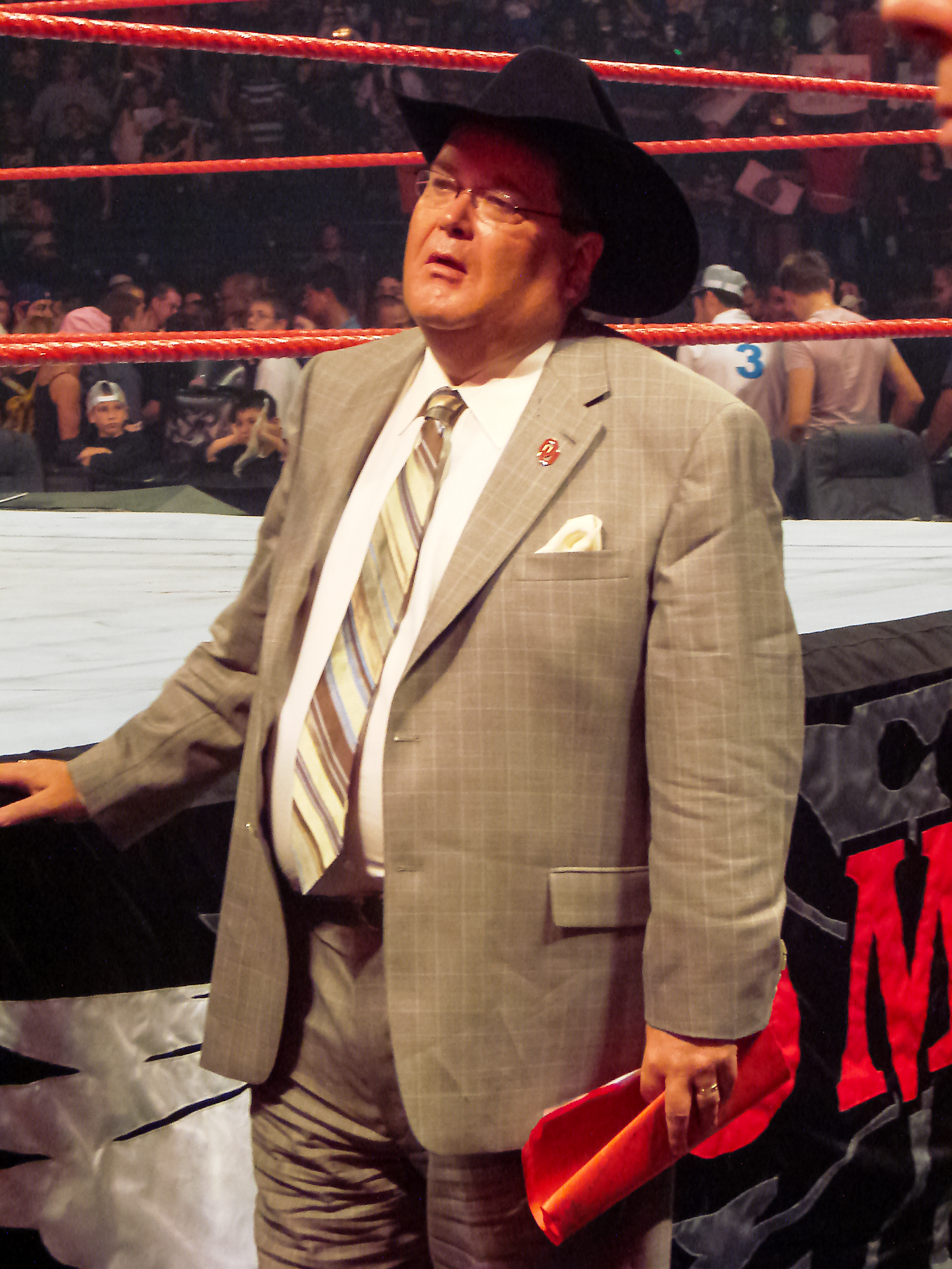
Jim Ross, the longtime lead announcer since July 11, 1994 until July 25, 1994, November 1997 until November 1998, April 1999 until October 10, 2005, and May 8, 2006, until June 23, 2008; he also appeared as the part-time color commentator along with Kevin Kelly, Vince McMahon and Michael Cole

On Raw Is War, fans were immersed in the feud between Mr. McMahon and Stone Cold Steve Austin, while superstars like Triple H, Mankind and The Rock were gradually elevated to main event status in the WWF. Other superstars such as Kane, Val Venis, The New Age Outlaws and Edge were coming through the ranks and exposing the WWF as territory where new talent could ascend, as opposed to WCW. Matters were so heated between the two programs that, when both shows were in the Hampton Roads area on the same night (Raw Is War in Hampton, Virginia, Nitro in Norfolk, Virginia), DX was sent to film a "war" segment at the Norfolk Scope where they berated WCW and interviewed fans on camera who stated that they received their Nitro tickets for free (presumably in an attempt by WCW to pack the arena to capacity due to low ticket sales).

On January 4, 1999, Mick Foley, who had wrestled for WCW during the early 1990s as Cactus Jack, won the WWF Championship as Mankind on Raw Is War. On orders from Bischoff, Nitro announcer Tony Schiavone gave away this previously taped result on a live Nitro and then sarcastically added, "That's gonna put some butts in the seats", consequently resulting in over 600,000 viewers switching channels to Raw Is War to see the underdog capture the WWF Championship. This was also the night that Nitro aired a WCW World Heavyweight Championship match in which Kevin Nash lay down for Hollywood Hogan after Hogan poked him in the chest.

At the WWF's Over the Edge pay-per-view on May 23, 1999, Owen Hart died after an in-ring stunt gone wrong. The following night on Raw (which was named Raw Is Owen), the entire episode was dedicated to the memory of Hart with various WWF personalities delivering out-of-character comments on the accident. While the episode was the second highest rated episode of Raw up to that point, it was regarded by several critics, including Hart's brother, Bret, as being in bad taste.

Starting with the August 23, 1999 episode, every Raw was generally live, which remains the format today. A few exceptions still exist, most notably during the Christmas and holiday season when WWE will tape two weeks worth of shows so their superstars can be home for the holiday season. Raw will also often air on tape delay whenever the company is touring overseas, such as its biannual airing of Raw from the United Kingdom (which is shown live in that country). Until the end of its first run on USA Network in 2000, Raw would also often be pre-empted by the annual Westminster Kennel Club Dog Show, which after WWE's return to USA in 2005 would air on CNBC on Monday nights.

On September 27, 1999, Mick Foley helped Raw Is War achieve some of its highest ratings ever with a segment featuring himself (as Mankind) and The Rock. In a send-up of the television series This Is Your Life, Mankind presented people from The Rock's past, such as a home economics teacher, gym teacher and old high school girlfriend, all of whom were hilariously rejected by The Rock. The This is Your Life segment remains one of the highest rated segments in Raw viewership history, with an 8.4 rating.

== TNN / Spike TV years (2000–2005) ==
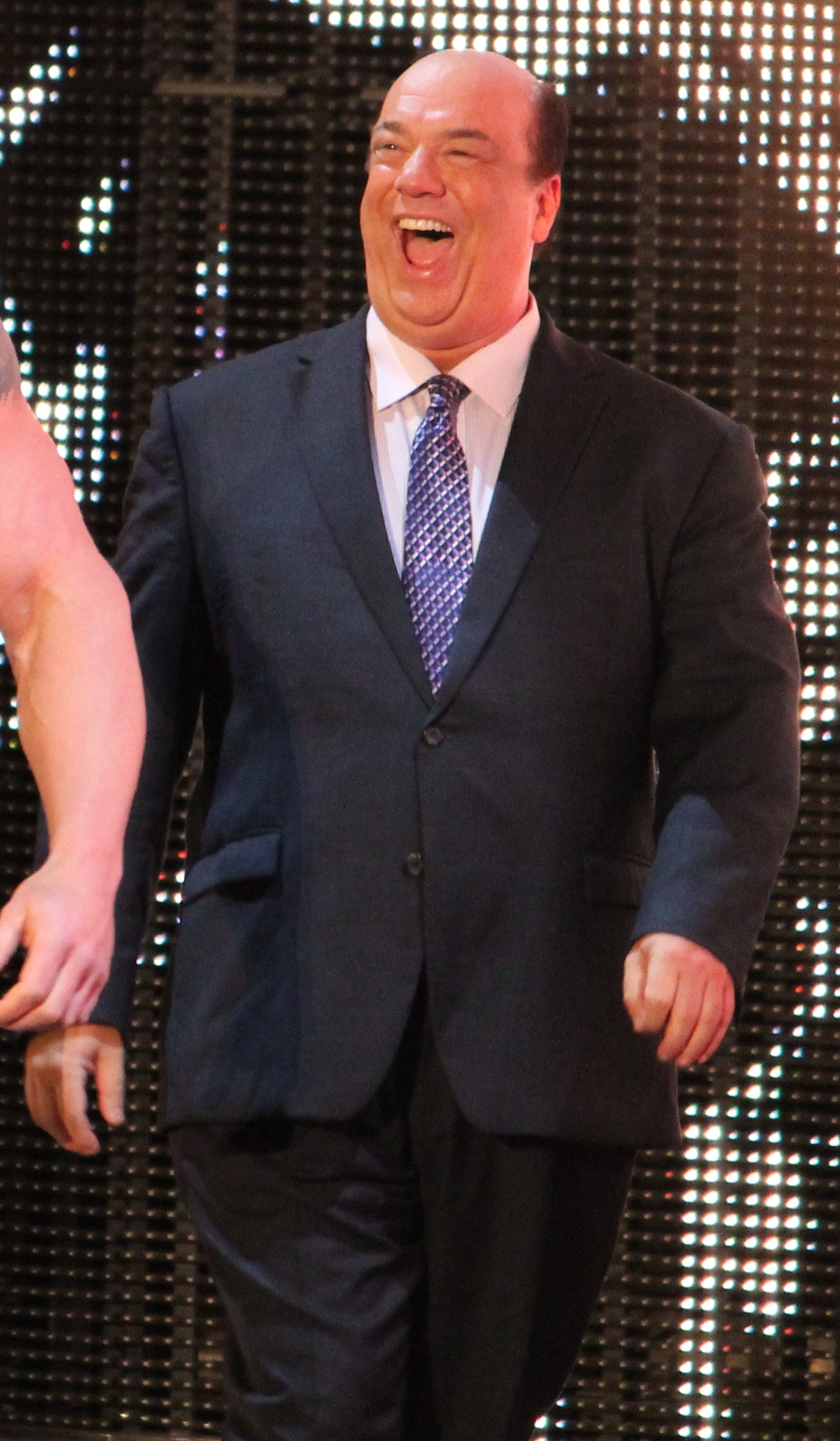
Paul Heyman who joined the broadcast team on Raw Is War on March 5, 2001, until July 9, 2001, replacing Jerry "The King" Lawler after the closing of ECW; he also made a return as a commentator on July 30, 2001, until November 12, 2001

=== WCW Invasion (2000–2002) ===
In June 2000, Viacom, the parent company of UPN, which aired WWF SmackDown!, won the rights of all WWF programming (including Raw Is War) for $12.6 million after the World Wrestling Federation Entertainment, Inc. (WWFE) sued USA Network over the right of first refusal contractual dispute ruled in Delaware court. Raw Is War premiered on TNN (which later became Spike TV) on September 25, 2000. The new television contract with Viacom, TNN/Spike TV's parent company, and the subsequent purchase of competitor WCW led to many changes in WWF's programming content.

Just before the final night of the Monday Night Wars, Jim Ross was joined in commentary by the owner of ECW, Paul Heyman, who replacing Jerry "The King" Lawler on March 5, 2001, until July 9, 2001. Heyman made a return on Raw Is War as a commentator on July 30, 2001, until November 12, 2001.

WCW's sharp decline in revenue and ratings led to AOL Time Warner selling selected assets such as the WCW name, tape library, and contracts to the WWF in March 2001. The final episode of Nitro aired on March 26, 2001. The show began with Vince McMahon making a short statement about his recent purchase of WCW and ended with a simulcast with Raw on TNN and Nitro on TNT including an appearance by Vince's son Shane. The younger McMahon interrupted his father's gloating over the WCW purchase to explain that Shane was the one who actually owned WCW, setting up what became the WWF's "Invasion" storyline. Following the purchase of WCW and the September 11 attacks, the program was retitled as Raw on October 1, 2001, permanently retiring the Raw Is War moniker in the wake of the upcoming United States invasion of Afghanistan.

=== Brand extension (2002–2005) ===
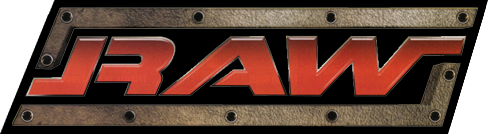
The Raw logo used from April 1, 2002 to October 2, 2006.

In the spring of 2002, the WWF underwent a process they called the "brand extension". The WWF divided itself into two de facto wrestling promotions with separate rosters, storylines and authority figures. Raw and SmackDown! would host each division, give its name to the division and essentially compete against each other. The split came about as a result of the WWF purchasing their two biggest competitors, WCW and ECW, and the WWF having an abundance of talent on the roster. The brand extension was publicly announced by Linda McMahon during a telecast of Raw on March 18, 2002, and became official the next week. Shortly thereafter, the WWF was legally required to change the name of the company to World Wrestling Entertainment (WWE). Wrestlers became show-exclusive, wrestling for their specific show only.

== Return to USA Network (2005–2024) ==
=== Brand extension continues (2005–2011) ===
On March 10, 2005, Viacom and WWE decided not to go on with the agreement with Spike TV, effectively ending Raw and other WWE programs's tenure on the network when their deal expired in September 2005. On April 4, 2005, WWE announced a three-year deal with NBCUniversal to bring Raw back to its former home, the USA Network, with two yearly specials on NBC and a Spanish Raw on Telemundo. On the same week as Raw's return to the USA Network, Spike TV scheduled Ultimate Fighting Championship (UFC)'s live Ultimate Fight Night in Raw's old timeslot in an attempt to go head-to-head with Raw.

On June 26, 2005, Jonathan Coachman revealed that he would be the new color commentator for Raw, a position he held until April 24, 2006, when he left to become the Raw General Manager on June 11, 2007. Coachman also did the play-by-play over the next three weeks before Joey Styles revealed that he would be the new lead announcer for Raw on the following week after the firing of Jim Ross by Linda and Vince McMahon on October 10, 2005. The show's first night back on October 3, 2005, on the USA Network was billed as the "WWE Homecoming", a three-hour special that featured the return of former WWF/E Champions such as Hulk Hogan, Stone Cold Steve Austin, Shawn Michaels, Mick Foley, Triple H and Vince McMahon, along with cameos from legends such as Roddy Piper, Jimmy Hart, Jimmy Snuka, Harley Race and Ted DiBiase. Also, it featured a 30-minute Iron Man match between Shawn Michaels and Kurt Angle. USA also showed Raw Exposed, an hour of the best moments of Raw during its previous run on USA. WWE announced that Raw received its highest ratings in three years. On-camera, the show began to be referred to as Monday Night Raw again.

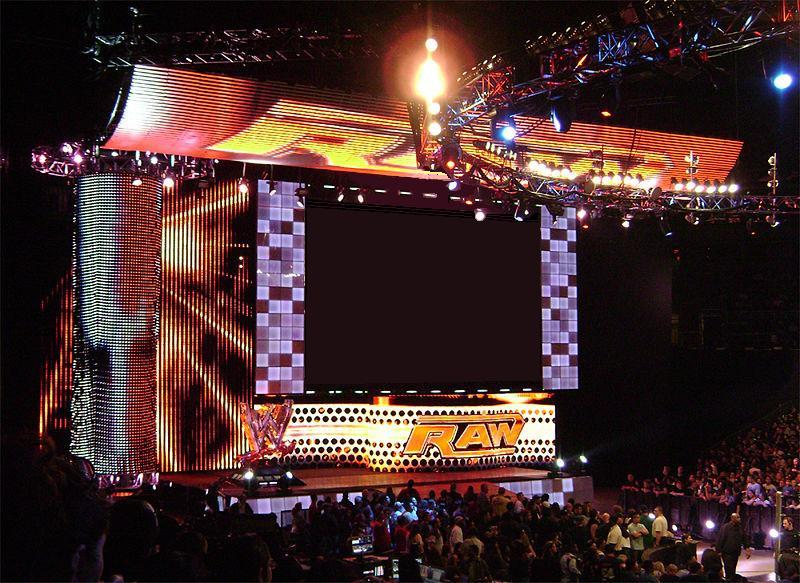
Raw's first version of the universal WWE HD set used from January 21, 2008, until July 16, 2012

During the September 25, 2006 episode of Raw in Oklahoma City, Oklahoma, the opening of Raw suffered a blackout. Spotlights were the only lights running in the house, thus the opening match (between Lita and Candice Michelle) was contested in the dark. Power in the presentation was later restored. Another similar moment happened back on May 26, 1996, in Florence, South Carolina for WWF In Your House 8: Beware of Dog, when a major thunderstorm hit the Florence Civic Center causing major chaos for the pay-per-view. That Tuesday, Beware of Dog returned to North Charleston, South Carolina to finish out three matches that were not shown because of the lost power feed. That October 9, 2006 episode of Raw held a three-hour season premiere called the "Raw Family Reunion", where the Raw brand debuted a new logo and theme song, Papa Roach's "...To Be Loved". The episode also featured talent from the SmackDown! and ECW brands. Later that month, on October 23, Raw aired its 700th episode.

On June 25, 2007, Raw was scheduled in Corpus Christi, Texas to be a three-hour special memorial show for the storyline death of the Mr. McMahon character. Two weeks earlier, the show had broadcast an angle in which Mr. McMahon was presumably murdered by a bomb planted within his limousine. The "Mr. McMahon tribute" was cancelled on the day it was due to air after the real life death of Chris Benoit and his family. The show was hastily canceled, the audience was denied entrance to the arena and that night's episode instead became a three-hour tribute to Benoit, airing highlights from the WWE DVD Hard Knocks: The Chris Benoit Story and a selection of Benoit's most famous matches. Several wrestlers paid tribute in the form of real interviews about him and Vince McMahon broke character to address the viewers about what had happened. However, when the facts of Benoit's death came to light, WWE pulled this episode from international markets which aired Raw on a tape delay basis. Several channels announced the episode was being withheld for legal reasons. A substitute Raw, hosted by Todd Grisham from WWE Studios, was created featuring recaps of John Cena's WWE Championship victories, mainly the ones that had occurred over the past year. The episode started with a message from Vince McMahon, similar to the one which originally aired on the June 26 episode of ECW. Some countries that received WWE programming up to three weeks late had all Chris Benoit matches edited out.

On December 10, 2007, Raw celebrated its 15th anniversary in a three-hour special on the USA Network. The Raw 15th Anniversary DVD was also released which featured some of the most memorable moments in Raw history, hosted by Todd Grisham.

From 2010 to 2011, the heel stable The Nexus feuded with John Cena and the WWE Raw roster. On September 19, 2011, Triple H fired The Miz and R-Truth.

=== End of brand extension (2011–2012) ===
From July 2010 to July 2012 there was the Anonymous Raw General Manager after firing the previous general manager, Bret Hart, who ran Raw intermittently. In August 2011, the brand extension was suspended with superstars from SmackDown appearing on Raw as well (and vice versa), and the show was named Raw SuperShow. It was revealed the Anonymous Raw General Manager was Hornswoggle on July 9, 2012.

=== Move to a three-hour format (2012–2016) ===
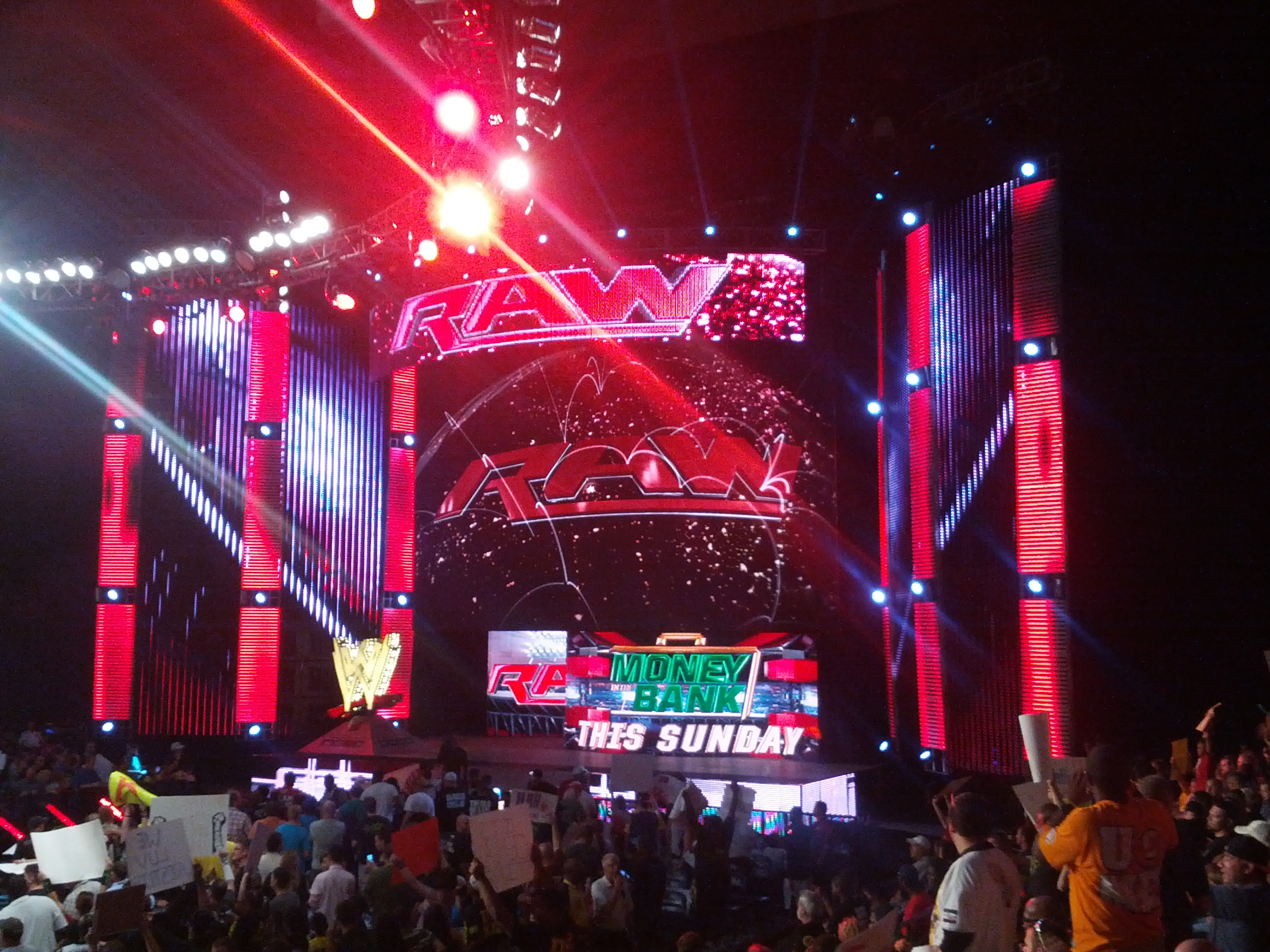
WWE Raw stage set used July 30, 2012-July 18, 2016. The scratch WWE logo podium shown here was replaced with the WWE Network logo on the Raw after SummerSlam 2014. A bigger version was used on the Raw 1000 episode on July 23, 2012

On July 23, 2012, Raw aired its 1,000th episode, which also began its permanent three-hour format and saw the removal of the "Supershow" part from the show's name, with exclusive live chat by Charlie Sheen via Skype. On January 14, 2013, Raw celebrated its 20th year on the air. On April 1, 2013, John "Bradshaw" Layfield joined the broadcast team alongside Michael Cole and Jerry "The King" Lawler. Layfield began sitting in as a commentator on September 16, 2012 at Night of Champions, replacing Lawler, who was recovering from a heart attack he suffered during Raw in Montreal, Canada the previous Monday. Layfield also appeared on Raw as a commentator for one night on December 9 and 23, 2013, and January 6, 2014, while Lawler was absent and sick during the day. He also sat in on September 17, 2012, and October 8, 2012, and October 28, 2012, at Hell in a Cell pay-per-view alongside Cole and Jim Ross, following Lawler's recovering from a heart attack once again. He made a return as a commentator on Raw's 20th Anniversary special episode on January 14, 2013, alongside Ross and Lawler, following Ross sat in for Cole, who allowed him to call the main event between John Cena and Dolph Ziggler inside steel cage. In the same time, the Raw episode filmed in New Jersey directly following WrestleMania 29 was noted as having various memorable moments involving chants from the event's vocal crowd, one of the most recognised is Fandango's theme song. The post-WrestleMania Raw has typically featured highly vocal crowds throughout history, regardless of location. On January 26, 2015, the post-Rumble Raw in Hartford was postponed due to a major winter storm and travel bans across Connecticut that were occurring at the time, and that night's episode instead became an exclusive interview inside the WWE World Headquarters in Stamford, Connecticut, the weather reports from John Layfield, and the clips from the night before, albeit with commercial breaks, courtesy of the WWE Network. Michael Cole, Byron Saxton and Renee Young interviewed several wrestlers, including Daniel Bryan, Seth Rollins, Brock Lesnar, Paul Heyman, and Roman Reigns to talk about last night's Royal Rumble in Philadelphia.

Jerry Lawler was going to join the broadcast team in 2012 on SmackDown until he had a heart attack. Lawler became ill with diverticulitis on January 1, 2015, leading to the WWE pay-per-view events kickoff analyst Booker T taking his announcing duties. When Lawler recovered from diverticulitis, WWE moved him to the SmackDown broadcasting team after the broadcast on January 9, 2015, with his first air date as January 15, 2015. Booker T also joined the broadcast team on Raw as the alternate color commentator on September 26, 2011, until October 3, 2011, and October 2, 2011, at Hell in a Cell pay-per-view, along with Michael Cole and Jim Ross, April 25, 2011 Raw episode alongside Josh Mathews, Cole and Lawler, and he also joined with Cole and Lawler to provide commentary on June 20, 2011, November 21, 2011, and March 26, 2012. On June 1, 2015, Booker T left Raw as a commentator to film Tough Enough, leaving the color-commentator position vacant. However, NXT color commentator and WWE pay-per-view events kickoff analyst Byron Saxton replaced him afterwards on June 8, 2015. Saxton appeared as guest announcer on Raw for two weeks after WrestleMania 31, alongside Jerry Lawler because Cole, Layfield, and Booker T were assaulted by Brock Lesnar in the opening segment. Cole, Lawler, and Layfield would continue to provide commentary during WWE pay-per-view events until December 13, 2015 (TLC), before Saxton took over for Lawler at the announce table on the next pay-per-view events (Royal Rumble, Fastlane and others) in 2016. For the 52 episodes of Raw in 2014, it was noted that only 18 episodes (34.6%) featured the show ending with a main event match with a decisive finish. At one point around WrestleMania, there were 10 occasions over 11 weeks where Raw ended with either a talking segment or a main event that ended in a disqualification or non-finish.

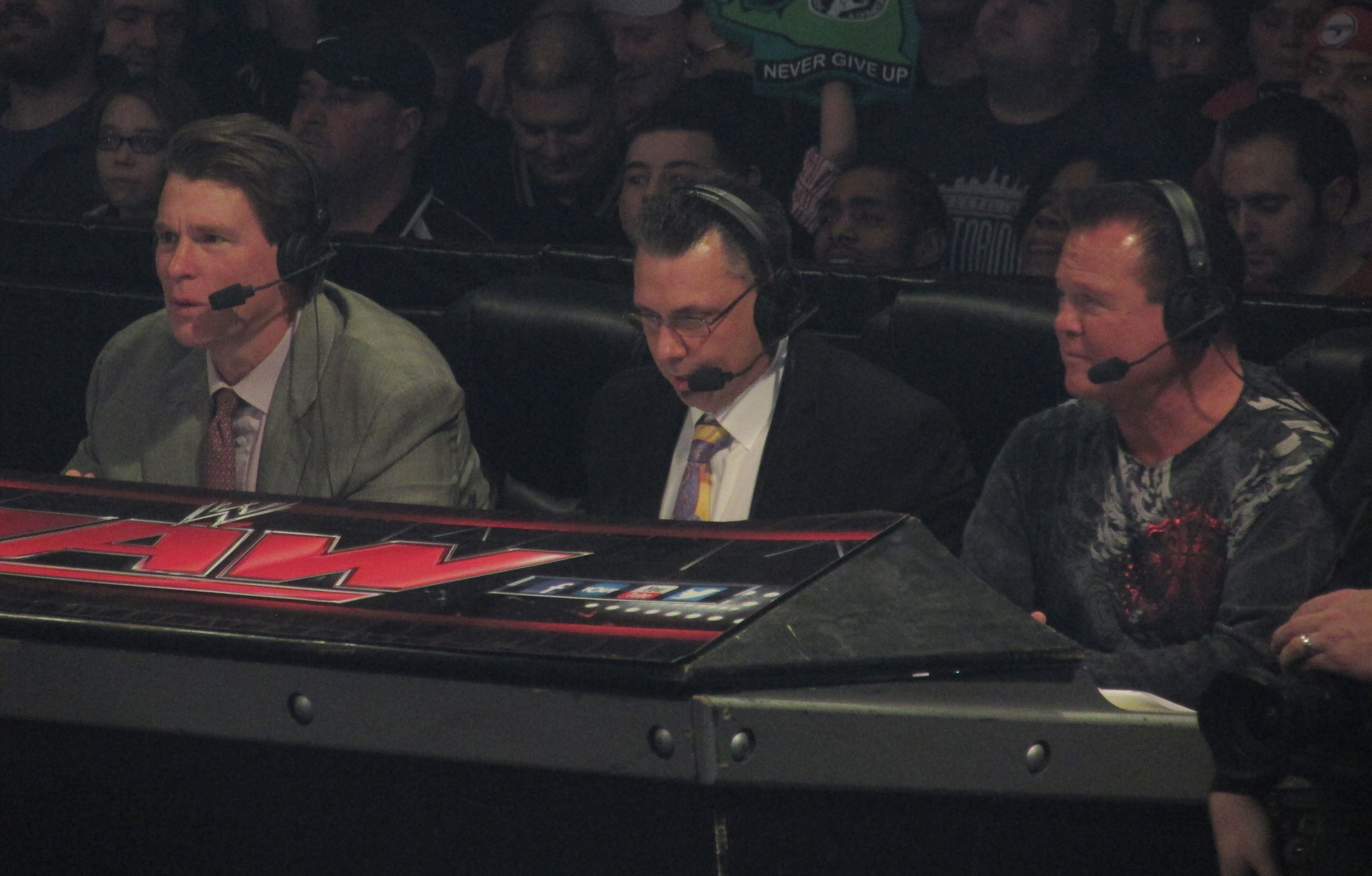
Raw began once again using a full-time three man team with Michael Cole, Jerry Lawler, and John "Bradshaw" Layfield, with their fourth appearance as April 1, 2013, until December 29, 2014; they also provide commentary on Raw on December 17, 2012, January 14 (except main event) and 28, 2013, and in all pay-per-view events since November 18, 2012 at Survivor Series, until December 13, 2015, at TLC

Raw was awarded the 2014 Wrestling Observer Newsletter award for Worst Television Show, while its commentators John Layfield, Jerry Lawler and Michael Cole came in the top three in that order for the Worst Television Announcer award. Jon Mezzera and Wade Keller of Pro Wrestling Torch said respectively in 2015 that the Raw commentators "don't pay attention to the product. They are too busy making jokes and talking about other segments on the show and bickering with each other to actually pay attention and call what is happening in a match" and "It's not the announcers, though, it's the direction they're given. That falls on Vince McMahon".

After the February 23, 2015 episode of Raw saw the Divas division being showcased by a tag team match which lasted around half a minute, a Twitter hashtag called #GiveDivasAChance trended worldwide for around 1.5 days, with Diva AJ Lee and both Stephanie and Vince McMahon commenting on the hashtag and the status of the Divas division.

Charlotte along with Sasha Banks and Becky Lynch made their official debut on the July 13, 2015, episode of Raw after Stephanie McMahon called for a "revolution" in the Divas division. While Charlotte and Lynch allied with Paige, who was feuding with Team Bella (The Bella Twins and Alicia Fox), Banks allied with Tamina and Naomi, leading to a brawl between the three teams. In her pay–per–view debut, on July 19 at Battleground, Charlotte defeated Sasha Banks and Brie Bella in a triple threat match, with all members of the respective teams at ringside. The following night on Raw, Charlotte defeated Brie in a singles match.

On July 19, 2015, The Undertaker returned at Battleground by interfering during the main event match between Brock Lesnar and Seth Rollins. On the July 20, 2015 episode of Raw, Undertaker explained his actions at Battleground. Later on in the night, Paul Heyman was talking about Battleground and about what happened at WrestleMania XXX, where Lesnar defeated Undertaker to end The Undertaker's undefeated streak at WrestleMania, the Undertaker came out and started a brawl with Lesnar, which saw the WWE roster separating them both. On the 24th-season premiere, a historic match was made by Triple H as the main event would be Sting versus Big Show. Seth Rollins and John Cena got involved in the match, which Sting won via disqualification. Sting teamed up with Cena against Seth Rollins and Big Show and won by submitting Rollins.

Immediately after losing to Brock Lesnar at Hell in a Cell in October 2015, The Undertaker was given a standing ovation from the crowd. He decided to pay back their respects by doing his signature pose, but as he did so The Wyatt Family appeared and attacked him before carrying his unconscious body backstage. The following night on Raw, Bray Wyatt explained that he wanted to claim The Undertaker's soul and obtain its powers. Kane then appeared and attempted to attack the Wyatts, but he would be ambushed and attacked by the other Wyatt Family members before being carried backstage. On the November 9, 2015 episode of Raw from Manchester, United Kingdom, The Undertaker and Kane reunited as The Brothers of Destruction, reemerged and attacked The Wyatt Family. On the November 12, 2015 episode of SmackDown from Manchester, United Kingdom, Wyatt challenged The Undertaker and Kane to a tag team match against two members of The Wyatt Family of his choosing at Survivor Series, which they accepted later that night. Shane McMahon returned to WWE for the first time in almost seven years on the February 22, 2016 episode of Raw by interrupting his sister, Stephanie McMahon, receiving the "Vincent J. McMahon Legacy of Excellence" Award from their father, Vince McMahon, to announce that he wanted control of Raw since under Stephanie McMahon the company has had problems. By making a deal with his father, Shane would wrestle The Undertaker at WrestleMania 32 in a Hell in a Cell match; if Shane McMahon won, he would gain control of Raw. Also, if Shane won, Wrestlemania 32 would be The Undertaker's last Wrestlemania. However, if Shane lost, Vince would get all of the items out of Shane's lock box. Although Shane McMahon lost to the Undertaker at Wrestlemania 32, he was general manager for a while. The February 29, 2016 episode of Raw, which was broadcast live from Bridgestone Arena in Nashville, Tennessee, marked the first time the show aired on a Leap Day in its 23-year history. That night's episode featured Stephanie McMahon's speech after accepting the "Vincent J. McMahon Legacy of Excellence" Award from Mr. McMahon from the week after Fastlane, and the main event between Dean Ambrose and Alberto Del Rio (with The League of Nations' King Barrett, Sheamus and Rusev), which ended in a disqualification win for Ambrose, while Del Rio, Barrett, Sheamus, Rusev and Triple H attacked him. Triple H would wrestle Ambrose for the WWE World Heavyweight Championship at Roadblock, where Triple H won by pinfall and retained the title. On the March 14, 2016 episode of Raw from Pittsburgh, Pennsylvania, Roman Reigns came back and had a brawl with Triple H after a win against Dolph Ziggler, in which Reigns hit Triple H with a LED monitor on his head, which required Triple H to need stitches. The referees (including Rod Zapata and Darrick Moore, except the injured Dan Engler), the securities, Mark Henry, Jack Swagger and The Usos had to stop Reigns' attack. The Undertaker also came back and chokeslammed Shane McMahon in front of his father, Vince.

=== Second brand split (2016–present) ===
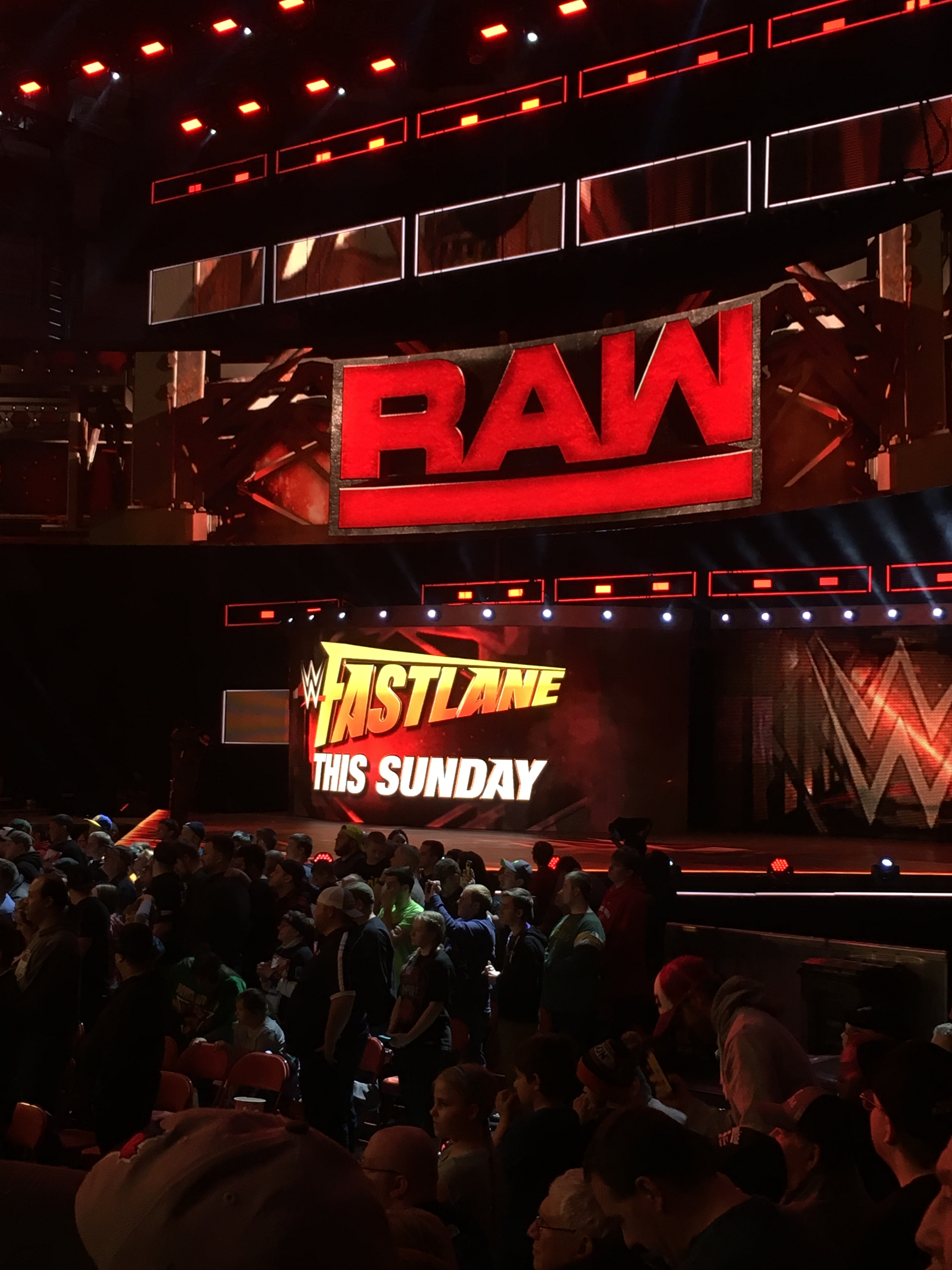
WWE Raw stage set used from August 21, 2016, until September 23, 2019; a similar set would be used until March 9, 2020.

On May 25, WWE reintroduced the brand split, with distinctive rosters for both Raw and SmackDown. On the July 11, 2016 episode of Raw, Vince McMahon named Stephanie McMahon the Commissioner of Raw. The following week, Mick Foley was introduced as Raw's new general manager. Color commentator Corey Graves replaced JBL immediately following the 2016 WWE draft. As part of the "New Era", Raw received a new logo and a new set with red ring ropes, a brand new stage, used at SummerSlam. Furthermore, the broadcast table was moved to the entrance ramp similar to how it was in 2002–2005. On October 3, Raw made history once again by having their women face off in the main event for the first time since December 6, 2004, as Sasha Banks defeated Charlotte by submission to regain the WWE Raw Women's Championship, and on October 30 had the first Women's Main Event Hell in a Cell match. In October 2016, Bill Goldberg returned to Raw after 12 years, and Raw got a big boost in ratings. On October 17, Goldberg returned to Raw to answer Brock Lesnar's challenge which he accepted at Survivor Series. Raw made history once again by having their women face off in the main event for the first time ever in a Falls count anywhere match as Sasha Banks defeated Charlotte by submission to regain the WWE Raw Women's Championship.

On January 22, 2018, WWE celebrated the Raw 25 Years, with a simulcast show at the Barclay's Center in Brooklyn and the home of the first Monday Night Raw, the Manhattan Center. The following week, Raw updated its graphics and theme songs. On the February 19 episode of Raw, six days before Elimination Chamber, seven participants of the men's Elimination Chamber match, Braun Strowman, Elias, Finn Bálor, John Cena, Roman Reigns, Seth Rollins and The Miz, were involved in a Gauntlet match that began with Reigns and Rollins. Strowman won the Gauntlet match by pinning The Miz in what was the longest match in WWE history, lasting nearly two hours.

From June 24, 2019, WWE implemented an order from Vince McMahon that there would be no wrestling during commercial breaks to Raw and SmackDown. An exception was during split screen viewing of both the match and commercials. This led to matches having breaks and restarts, and best of three falls matches with relatively quick falls. This measure was discontinued after the March 9, 2020 episode of Raw as a result of the COVID-19 pandemic, with all future episodes of the program being recorded at the WWE Performance Center beginning with the following week's episode.

== Move to Netflix (2025–present) ==
In September 2023, USA Network announced that SmackDown would return to the network in October 2024 after the expiration of its contract with Fox; it was concurrently reported that the rights to Raw and NXT were on the market with heavy interest among linear networks and digital properties.

On January 23, 2024, TKO Group announced that Netflix would acquire the rights to Raw beginning in January 2025, in what was reported to be a 10-year deal worth $500 million per-year (roughly double the value of WWE's current agreement with NBCUniversal). The agreement will initially cover the United States, Canada, the United Kingdom, and Latin America, with other territories to be added in the future. The agreement also gives Netflix rights to all WWE programming outside of the United States (replacing WWE Network), including weekly shows, archive content, and live events. While USA Network's contract for Raw was to expire in October 2024, WWE reached a short-term extension of its agreement with NBCUniversal to keep Raw on the network through the end of the year. From October 7 through December 30, Raw was shortened from three to two hours; wrestling reporter Dave Meltzer stated that this was a request made by USA Network.

On January 4, 2025, WWE chief content officer Triple H says that length of the show on Netflix will be flexible and for the first time it will not have a stand running time due to the advantage of the streaming platform over set runtimes on cable, with Levesque stating the average runtime would be around 2.5 hours.

== Broadcast history ==
=== United States ===
Channel	Timeslot	Years
USA	Monday 9–10 p.m. ET	January 11, 1993 – February 3, 1997
USA	Monday 9–11 p.m. ET	February 10, 1997 – September 18, 2000
TNN/Spike TV	Monday 9–11 p.m. ET	September 25, 2000 – September 26, 2005
USA	Monday 9–11 p.m. ET	October 3, 2005 – July 16, 2012
USA	Monday 8–11 p.m. ET	July 23, 2012 – September 30, 2024
USA	Monday 8–10 p.m. ET	October 7, 2024 – December 30, 2024
Netflix	Monday 8–10:30 p.m. ET (Note: In cases where Raw takes place outside North America, it may air live earlier in the day. Select episodes may also end before, or after, 10:30 p.m. for creative reasons.)	January 6, 2025 – present

Syfy in the United States started airing a 2-hour replay of Raw on May 20, 2016. On June 26, 2018, WWE and USA Network announced a five-year contract extension for Raw. The new agreement for the live, weekly three-hour block commenced in October 2019. Clips from some WWE shows have also been shown on Fox Sports.com.

=== Online streaming (catch up) ===
On September 24, 2012, Hulu signed a multi-year deal with WWE to stream all of the company's TV shows and some of its web series which includes Raw. Episodes of Raw are available for viewing the following day as a condensed 90-minute version is available, not the full version as shown the previous night on USA Network.

As of December 9, 2016, all episodes of Raw are available on demand on the WWE Network. Recent episodes are available for on-demand viewing 30 days after their original air date.

After WrestleMania 32 in 2016, WWE began with airing the newest episodes of Raw and SmackDown on YouTube for countries that do not air WWE programming on traditional TV for free in less than 24 hours after the original broadcast (The links are blocked in countries where the shows are traditionally available). The 90-minute Hulu version gets put on YouTube for international audiences.

As of January 6, 2025, Raw is exclusively streaming on Netflix in most countries. Some of the archived episodes of Raw are branded Raw Vault.

=== Canada ===
From 1995 to 2006, Raw was shown on The Sports Network (TSN) until it moved to rival sports broadcaster The Score (now renamed Sportsnet 360) after it was announced that TSN would be carrying Monday Night Football for the 2006 season. This meant that Canadian viewers would have to watch via tape-delay, as The Score did not broadcast Raw live at that time. Around that time, The Score aired Countdown to Raw until May 2013 when Raw is shown live to match the United States airtime. It was also shown on CKVR-TV in Barrie and CKMI-TV in Quebec until 2009.

During its run on TSN, which aired live, Raw occasionally had been censored live for extremely violent scenes, or when female wrestlers or characters were assaulted by male wrestlers (particularly one segment that featured the 3-Minute Warning assaulting Kitana Baker). These actions are supposed to be in order to meet Canadian broadcast standards, with repeat broadcasts often more heavily edited. This move had disappointed many wrestling fans over the years, and is unusual since the violence of wrestling scenes are not significantly different from other television programs aired on regular Canadian networks.

Due to Rogers holding the rights to the National Hockey League broadcasts, Raw also aired on its OLN channel (now Bravo).

All archived broadcasts of Raw were available on the WWE Network until its closure in December 2024. Since January 1, 2025, WWE’s Canadian broadcast rights are held by Netflix. Select archived episodes are available for streaming on Netflix under the title Raw Vault, with live broadcasts beginning on January 6.

=== Latin America ===
Raw has aired live on Fox Sports in Mexico and across Central and South America. It also airs on La Red in Chile, Unitel in Bolivia, Canal Uno in Colombia, Teleamazonas in Ecuador, Andina de Televisión in Peru, Repretel: Canal 11 in Costa Rica, Canal VTV in El Salvador, Canal 5 in Honduras, RPC Canal 4 in Panama and Imagen Televisión in Mexico.

After October 6, 2014, Raw has been airing live throughout Latin America on Fox Sports. Currently, Raw is broadcast live on ESPN 4 for Central America and on Fox Sports 2 in South America, in Mexico it is broadcast on Fox Sports, in Argentina on Fox Sports 3, in Chile on Fox Sports 1 and in Brazil on Fox Sports 2 and ESPN Extra, (also available on Star+ for Central and South America).

In January 2025 Netflix acquired the rights to Raw in Latin America. It is now the broadcaster of the programme in Brazil, Chile, Colombia, Ecuador, Mexico, Peru.

=== South Africa ===
Previously the rights to broadcast Raw, along with other WWE shows, were held by free-to-air broadcaster e.tv. Raw would play on Sundays in the evening, with a 7-day delay, edited to one hour and was the most watched program on the channel. However, in 2017 e.tv decided not to renew its broadcasting deal with WWE. The rights were later resold to SuperSport (the initial broadcasters of WWE programming).

In 2019 SuperSport, along with its parent company MultiChoice, signed a deal to broadcast the 24-hour WWE channel as a pop-up channel for five months on their DStv platform. It is now a permanent channel on DStv under the channel number 128

=== Europe ===
In Germany, Austria and Switzerland, Raw airs live and is on-demand on the Website of Bild, only for Bild+ Subscribers and with German commentary on ProSieben MAXX every Wednesday at 10pm.

In Czech Republic, Raw previously aired on Nova Sport but is now on Netflix.

In Finland, Raw airs on MTV3 Max as well as Smackdown and ECW which later changed to NXT (2007–2010). MTV Sub resumed broadcasting WWE's Smackdown and RAW in 2021 to 2022. Raw now airs on Netflix.

In France and Belgium, Raw airs on AB1 every Wednesday with French commentary.

In Italy, Raw airs live on Discovery Plus and with the Italian commentary 7 days after on DMAX.

In Lithuania, Raw airs on BTV.

In Poland, Raw airs on Extreme Sports Channel. Raw now airs on Netflix.

In Portugal, Raw airs live on Sport TV with Portuguese commentary. Raw now airs on Netflix.

In Romania, Raw airs on Telekom Sport.

In Russia, there is currently no broadcaster of the programme. Raw previously aired on Match! Fighter with Russian commentary until 2022, when WWE ceased broadcasting their programs and Premium Live Events in Russia in response to the Russian invasion of Ukraine.

In Serbia, Raw airs on Prva Srpska Televizija. It airs on OBN in Bosnia and Herzegovina and on RTL 2 in Croatia.

In Spain, Raw aired on Mega every Saturday at 1pm with Spanish commentary.

In the United Kingdom and Ireland, Raw was shown live on TNT Sports in the United Kingdom and Ireland, in a deal which began January 2020. Since 2025 it is live on Netflix.

=== Asia and Pacific ===
In Iran, Raw aired on FM1.

In India, Raw airs exclusively on Netflix. Previously the program aired on Sony Sports network, Ten Sports since 2002 and on Star Sports from 1996 to 2001.

In Israel, Raw airs on Sport 1 and Sport 1 HD but is now on Netflix.

In Indonesia, Raw airs on Mola TV On-Demand.

In Indonesia, Raw streams live on Blast TV (formerly TapGO) with a live and encore telecast on TAP Sports & Blast Sports on the same day.

In Singapore, Raw airs live on Starhub's Hub Sports 2.

In Malaysia, Raw airs on Astro's Sport Plus.

In Australia, Raw had aired on Fox8 since 2003, usually on a 27-hour tape delay, but has started airing live as of February 4, 2014. It is also aired on Thursday nights on 9Go! as a one-hour version.

In Japan, Raw airs on Abema.

In New Zealand, Raw airs live on Sky 5 and Friday nights on Sky Open as a one-hour version.

In China Raw airs on various local networks. Raw airs on ViuTVsix in Hong Kong.

In Taiwan, Raw airs on Videoland Television Network in both English and Thai.

In Pakistan, Raw airs on Ten Sports.

In South Korea, Raw airs on IB Sports.

In Turkey, Raw began airing on S Sport and S Sport Plus in 2017, continuing until 2023. Raw now airs on Netflix.
