= Aliana Lohan =

American television personality and singer (born 1993)

- Born: Aliana Taylor Lohan; December 22, 1993 (age 32); Cold Spring Harbor, New York, U.S.
- Other name: Ali Lohan
- Occupations: Singer; television personality; actress; model
- Years active: 1998–present
- Parents: Michael Lohan (father); Dina Lohan (mother)
- Relatives: Lindsay Lohan (sister)
- Modeling information
- Agency: NEXT
- Musical career
- Labels: YMC (2006–2007); Interscope

Aliana Taylor "Ali" Lohan (LOH-han; born December 22, 1993) is an American singer, actress, model and television personality. She is the younger sister of actress and singer Lindsay Lohan.

== Early life ==
Lohan was born in Cold Spring Harbor, New York, on Long Island, to Donata "Dina" (née Sullivan) and Michael Lohan; the family later moved to Merrick. She is the younger sister of actress Lindsay Lohan and Michael Lohan Jr., and the older sister of Dakota "Cody" Lohan. She has three younger paternal half-siblings.

By the age of 22, she converted to Buddhism after being raised Catholic. As of 2020, she is a Christian music artist.

== Career ==
In 2005, she appeared in her sister Lindsay Lohan's music video for the song "Confessions of a Broken Heart (Daughter to Father)". Lohan's musical career began when she released a Christmas album, Lohan Holiday, in late 2006 under YMC Records (re-released in 2012 as Christmas with Ali Lohan). A single ("All The Way Around") was released on July 9, 2008 (in connection with the reality television series Living Lohan), which reached #75 on Hot Digital Songs.

As an actress, Lohan has largely appeared in uncredited roles in her sister's films, with her 2008 role of Traci Walker in a film adaptation of the R. L. Stine horror/fantasy novel Mostly Ghostly and her 2022 role of Bianca in the Netflix movie Falling for Christmas being her only credited roles.

Lohan began modeling at age three, working through the Ford Model agency and appearing in print campaigns for magazines such as Teen Vogue and Vogue Bambini. She appeared on the cover of CosmoGirl with sister Lindsay in November 2006. In 2011, she signed a multi-year modeling contract with NEXT models, later appearing on the cover of Fault magazine. In 2013, she signed with the modeling agency Wilhelmina.

On November 15, 2018, Billboard revealed that Lohan had released another single, "Long Way Down", and was working on an EP.

== Filmography ==
Film
Year	Title	Role	Notes
1998	The Parent Trap	Child at Airport	Uncredited role
2000	Life-Size	Girl at Football Stands	Uncredited role
2007	I Know Who Killed Me	Young Aubrey Fleming	Uncredited role
2008	Mostly Ghostly	Traci Walker	Direct-to-video
2022	Falling for Christmas	Bianca	

Television
Year	Title	Role	Notes
2005	E! True Hollywood Story: Lindsay Lohan	Herself	TV series documentary
2008	Living Lohan	Herself	Main role
2011	Keeping Up with the Kardashians	Herself	Episode: "Kim's Fairytale Wedding: A Kardashian Event - Part 2"
2014	Lindsay	Herself	Episode: "Part One"
2019	Lindsay Lohan's Beach Club	Herself	Episode: "Growing Up Lohan"

== Discography ==
=== Studio albums ===
Title	Details
Lohan Holiday	Released: October 31, 2006; Label: YMC; Formats: CD, digital download

=== Singles ===
List of singles, with selected chart positions
Title	Year	Peak chart positions		Album
Title	Year	US	SVK	Album
"All the Way Around"	2008	—^{[A]}	22	Non-album singles
"Long Way Down"	2018	—	—	Non-album singles
"Without You"	2022	—	—	Non-album singles
"—" denotes releases that did not chart or were not released in that territory.

=== Music videos ===
List of music videos, showing director(s)
Title	Year	Director	Notes
"Confessions of a Broken Heart"	2005	Lindsay Lohan	Lindsay Lohan's music video; guest appearance
"Christmas Magic"	2006	David Blood	
"All the Way Around"	2008	Jonathan Murray	

== Notes ==
Notes

- A: "All the Way Around" did not enter the Billboard Hot 100 but peaked at number 11 on the Bubbling Under Hot 100 Singles.
