= Dina Lohan =

American television personality (born 1962)

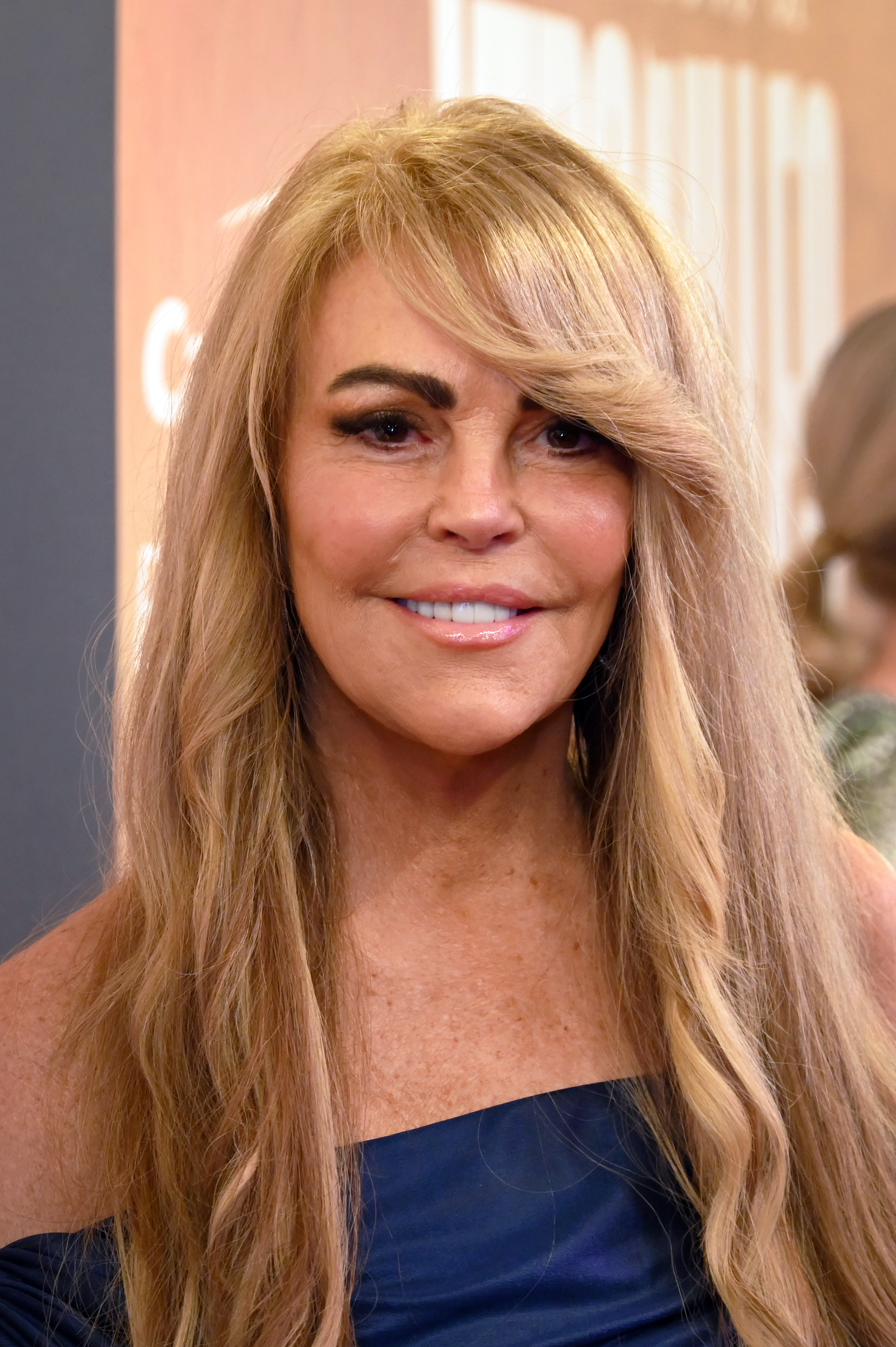
- Lohan in 2025
- Born: Donata Melina Nicolette Sullivan; September 15, 1962 (age 64); New York City, U.S.
- Occupations: manager; television personality
- Years active: 1998–present
- Known for: Living Lohan
- Spouse: Michael Lohan (m. 1985; div. 2007)
- Children: 4, including Lindsay and Ali Lohan

Donata Melina Nicolette "Dina" Lohan (/ˈdiːnə ˈloʊ.ən/ DEE-nə LOH-ən; née Sullivan; born September 15, 1962) is an American television personality who rose to fame as the mother and manager of actress Lindsay Lohan. She is also the mother of Michael Jr., Aliana and Dakota Lohan.

== Early life ==
Lohan was born and raised in New York City, to John L. and Ann Sullivan. She has two brothers, Matt and Paul. She is of Italian (from her mother) and Irish descent, and was raised Catholic. Lohan is a former singer and dancer.

== Career ==
She previously worked as a singer and a dancer. Lohan and her younger daughter Ali starred in the reality show Living Lohan, which debuted on May 26, 2008 on the cable television network E!. Lohan is also one of the executive producers of the series. In 2019, Dina was a cast member on season 2 of Celebrity Big Brother.

== Personal life ==
In 1985, she married Michael Lohan. The couple briefly separated in 1988, and later reunited. Dina filed for divorce in 2005, and the couple reached a divorce settlement in August 2007, with the divorce scheduled to be finalized three months later. She was granted custody of their two youngest children, Ali and Cody. He had worked as a Wall Street trader and businessman who inherited his father's pasta business and has been in trouble with the law on several occasions. The Lohans have four children: Lindsay (b. 1986), Michael Jr. (b. 1987), Aliana (b. 1993), and Dakota "Cody" Lohan (b. 1996).

Lohan was arrested for speeding and driving under the influence in Nassau County, Long Island on September 12, 2013, and agreed to a plea deal which included admitting guilt. She was sentenced to 100 hours community service, had her drivers license revoked for one year, and was fined $3,000.

Lohan was arrested for driving under the influence and leaving the scene of an accident in Nassau County on January 11, 2020. CNN reported Lohan also faced "four other charges: operating an unregistered vehicle, operating an uninspected vehicle, driving without a license, and aggravated unlicensed operation of a vehicle in the 3rd degree, the online court records state." On December 3, 2021, she pleaded guilty to leaving the scene of an accident without reporting and to felony DWI and was sentenced to 18 days in jail, loss of her license for 18 months, and five years’ probation during which she must participate in a DWI program and have an ignition interlock on her vehicle to make sure she is not drinking before driving.

== Filmography ==
Title	Year	Role	Notes
1998	The Parent Trap	Woman at airport	Uncredited cameo
2008	Living Lohan	Herself	9 episodes; Also as executive producer (2 episodes)
2010	The Real Housewives of New York City	Herself	Episode: "Fall in Manhattan"
2011	Keeping Up with the Kardashians	Herself	Episode: "Kim's Fairytale Wedding: A Kardashian Event - Part 2"
2014	Lindsay	Herself	4 episodes
2015	The Millionaire Matchmaker	Herself	Episode: "Dina Lohan & Peter Marc Jacobson"
2016	Family Therapy with Dr. Jenn	Herself	Episode: "Family Therapy Begins"
2019	Celebrity Big Brother	Herself / Houseguest	13 episodes
