= Final Distance =

Single by Hikaru Utada

from the album Deep River
- Released: July 25, 2001
- Recorded: 2001
- Genre: Pop
- Length: 5:40
- Label: EMI Music Japan
- Songwriter: Hikaru Utada
- Producers: Akira Miyake; Hikaru Utada; Teruzane Utada

Hikaru Utada singles chronology
"Can You Keep a Secret?" (2001)	"Final Distance" (2001)	"Traveling" (2001)

Music video
- "Final Distance" on YouTube

"Final Distance" is a song recorded by Japanese-American singer Hikaru Utada. It was released on July 25, 2001 as the first single for their fourth studio album Deep River (2002). Utada wrote the song, and produced and composed it with long-time collaborators Akira Miyake, Utada's father Teruzane Utada. "Final Distance" is a re-recorded and re-arranged version of the song "Distance", originally released on Utada's 2001 album of the same name. The song was dedicated to Rena Yamashita, a six-year-old victim of the Ikeda school massacre who had written an essay about being inspired by Utada. Utada had stated that the meaning of the word "final" for the song "Final Distance" is "most important" rather than "last".

Musically, "Final Distance" incorporates more instrumentation than the previous version, including violins, an acoustic piano and synthesizers. The song strips the original pop music from "Distance" and is a pop ballad song. Despite the original version being written in 2000, Utada reflected on the emotions of sorrow, pain, anger and celebration of life while recording the single version.

"Final Distance" received positive reception from most music critics, who praised the re-arrangement and favored this version, although some critics felt the song was inferior to Utada's past ballad tracks. Critics have cited the track as one of Utada's career highlights. Commercially, "Final Distance" stalled at number two on the Oricon Singles Chart, making it their first single in two years to have missed the top spot. The song was also their lowest selling physical single at the time, a record that was surpassed by the 2004 single "Dareka no Negai ga Kanau Koro".

An accompanying music video was shot by Utada's then-husband Kazuaki Kiriya, featuring two versions of Utada inside a Utopian-inspired city with a circus and a gothic-like orchestra. Utada performed the song on an MTV Unplugged appearance in 2002 as well as on the Utada United 2006 concert tour.

== Background ==
During Utada's four-year career since their 1998 debut with the single "Automatic", they had become a prominent Japanese singer and producer and had experienced strong sales across Japan. Their first two singles since their debut; "Automatic" and "Movin' On Without You" sold over one million units in Japan, with the first selling over two million. The parent album First Love eventually became the highest selling Japanese album of all time, exceeding sales of more than 8.7 million units in Japan and was certified octuple platinum by the Recording Industry Association of Japan (RIAJ) for shipments of eight million units; eventually selling 9.91 million copies worldwide. By the end of the year, Utada was ranked number five on a Japanese radio station Tokio Hot 100 Airplay's Top 100 Artists of the 20th Century by the station and its listeners.

After having a two-year break from the public, Utada's second studio album Distance (2001) became another success, selling over four million units in Japan. The album was backed by the singles "Addicted to You", "Wait & See (Risk)", "For You" / "Time Limit" and "Can You Keep a Secret?", with nearly all the singles achieving over one million sales in Japan. On that album, Utada recorded "Distance", which contained the same lyrical content as "Final Distance", the arrangement was handled by Utada and Japanese composer Kei Kawano.

== Conception and composition ==
"Final Distance" was written, co-composed and co-produced by Utada. The song was co-composed and co-produced by their father Teruzane Utada and long-time collaborator Akira Miyake. Utada recorded the track at Studio Terra and Bunkamura Studio in Tokyo, Japan. "Final Distance" features several instrument pieces including strings arranged by Saito Neko and played by Great Eida, acoustic piano by Kawano Kei, synthesizers by Tsunemi Kazuhide and other instrument arrangement by Utada. Both "Final Distance" and "Distance" feature the same lyrics but arrangement for the latter track was handled by Kawano Kei. Utada had begun work on their third studio album Deep River in 2001, but the album was delayed to allow for a benign ovarian tumor to be surgically removed. Following recovery, Utada managed to re-record and finish the track in time to include it on the album.

The conception of re-recording "Final Distance" originated from the Ikeda school massacre that took place in June 2001. Osaka school janitor Mamoru Takuma, armed with a kitchen knife, stabbed and killed a total of eight children, with fifteen others being injured. One of the murdered schoolgirls, six-year old Rena Yamashita, had written an essay about Utada, talking about how she wanted to become an actress and how Utada inspired her. Yamashita had won an essay competition with her essay about Utada. Utada was in the studio while being told by their father about this. While recording the track, they reflected on the emotions of sorrow, pain, anger and celebration and felt that they had "found a new meaning" that they would "hold on to the end". They called the re-recorded version "the most beautiful thing I have ever made" and "wish[ed] Rena-chan had heard it too". Utada stated that the meaning of the word "final" for the song "Final Distance" is "most important" rather than "last."

Musically, "Final Distance" is a departure from the "bright and warm" pop version of "Distance". "Final Distance" is composed as a low-tempo pop ballad incorporating string assembles and pianos through the entire song. Utada's vocals are layered and sound more "anxious" than the original version. A reviewer from OngakuDB.com commented that it has a "hauntingly solemn atmosphere" and called it "fresh". The single also features a trance remix, a "funny" dance-pop remix, and two instrumentals of both "Distance" and "Final Distance".

== Reception ==
=== Critical response ===
"Final Distance" received acclaim from most music critics. David Jeffries of AllMusic selected the song as an album and career standout track for Utada. A reviewer from CDJournal had reviewed the original version "Distance" and said the song was a "positive" pop tune, commending the song's production. Another reviewer from CDJournal discussed Utada's first greatest hits compilation Utada Hikaru Single Collection Vol. 1 and commended the track. The reviewer said the song was "beautiful" and "delicate", and felt the production "penetrated" well.

Yonemoto Hiromi from Yeah! J-Pop praised the song's "transformation" into a pop ballad. Despite Himori calling it one of "[Utada's] masterpieces", he did find Utada's new ballad-focused music to be "inferior" to their previous music, citing the 1999 single "First Love" as an example. A reviewer from OngakuDB.com commented that they were "impressed" with the track, commending the "haunting atmosphere" and ballad influence. The reviewer also called it "tremendous".

=== Commercial response ===
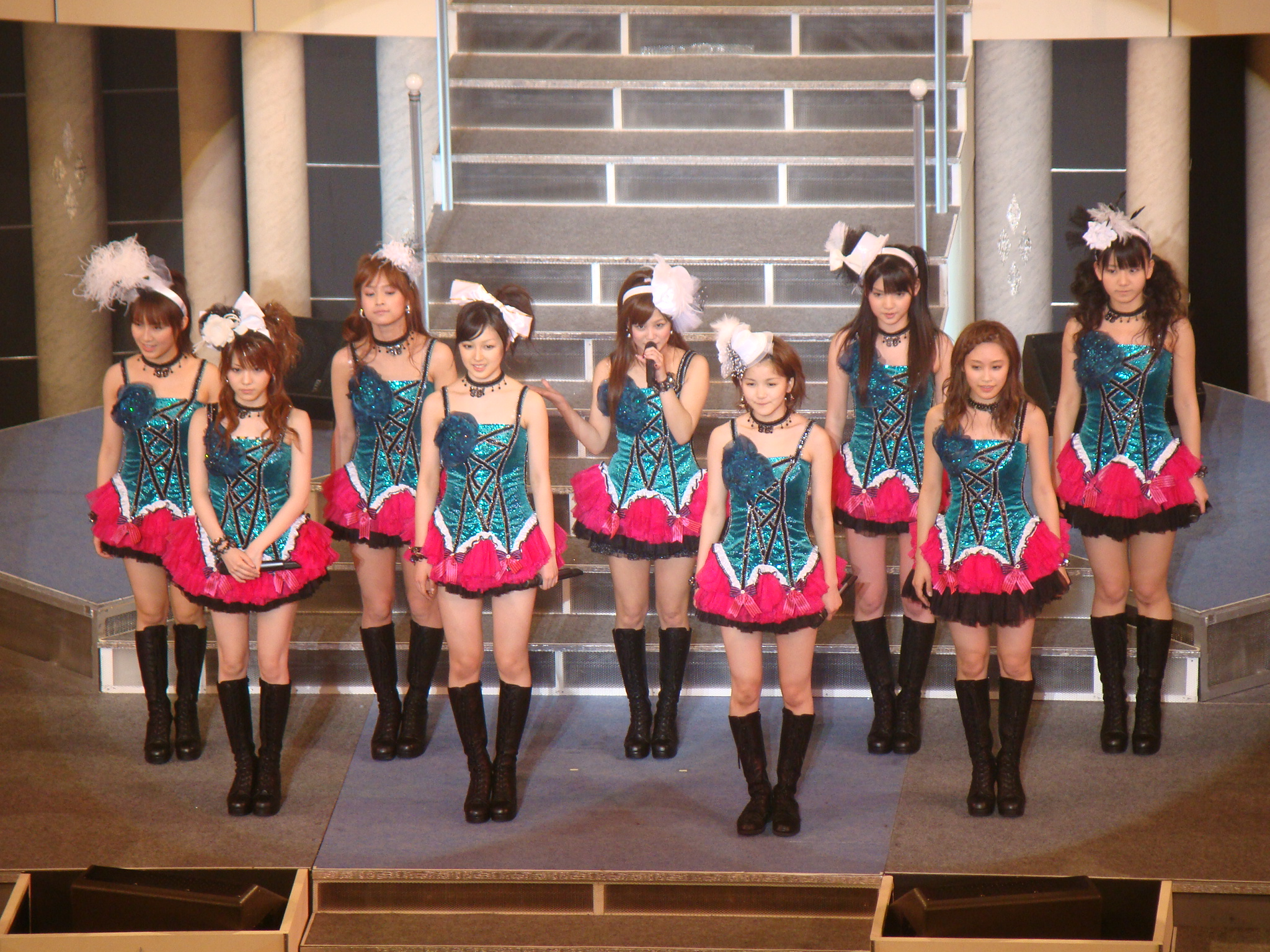
Japanese group Morning Musume occupied the first week at number one, until being replaced Japanese bands Arashi and B'z.

"Final Distance" debuted at number two on the Oricon Singles Chart. The song was blocked from the number one position which was held by "The Peace!" by Japanese idol girl group Morning Musume. "Final Distance" stayed at number two for four consecutive weeks, while the number one spot was occupied by two songs: "Jidai" by Japanese band Arashi for the second week and "Gold" by B'z for the third and fourth week respectively. The song fell to number six in its fifth week and number ten in its sixth week. In total, the song spent twelve weeks inside the top forty and fell to number forty-nine in final thirteenth week.

"Final Distance" was certified platinum by the Recording Industry Association of Japan (RIAJ) in September 2001 and sold shipments of over 500,000 units in Japan. "Final Distance" became Utada's lowest selling single in physical sales until this was surpassed by the 2004 single "Dareka no Negai ga Kanau Koro]" which only sold over 300,000 units with a double platinum certification. (Note: The RIAJ threshold had changed in July 2003, with original platinum certifications being 400,000 units.) (Note: Despite "Dareka no Negai ga Kanau Koro" selling over 350,000 physical units, the single sold over 500,000 digital units and over 100,000 ringtone units in Japan, tallying up to over 950,000 units sold in Japan.) Both were later surpassed by the 2005 single "Passion" which became Utada's lowest performing single based on both digital and physical sales, only selling 100,000 physical and digital units respectively.

"Final Distance" became Utada's first single since "First Love" to miss the top spot on the Oricon chart. It was the only single from Deep River to miss the top spot, with the following singles "Traveling", "Sakura Drops", "Letters" and "Hikari" peaking at number one.

== Music video ==
The music video for "Final Distance" was directed by Utada's then-husband Kazuaki Kiriya and was his first directional debut for Utada's singles.

Beginning with a time-lapse of a dark, rocky ocean, the video features two Utadas in two different settings; a gold circus-like room with various performers on a stage and Utada in a light colored outfit, and a dark gothic room with a string ensemble, dancers, and Utada sitting down in a school uniform. There are also assorted inset cuts, such as of small children dressed as angels, a white bird, and an elderly man dressed in dark clothing. Through the song, both Utadas are singing the track while dancing and walking around. At the 4-minute mark, both Utadas are shown in front of a yellow-lit backdrop, separated by a glass pane and facing one another. As they sing, they put their hands against the glass, trying to touch each other. The ending shows both Utadas side by side on a rock in the ocean, with a city in the distance. As shooting stars fall from the sky, both Utadas merge and the scene zooms out in time lapse, similar to the opening scene, and zooms out to show a space-like island surrounded by humanoid statues and mechanical structures hovering around.

== Cover versions and live performance ==
In November 2014, Universal Music Japan announced a tribute album for Utada's musical works, with covers of songs including "Final Distance" to be performed by a variety of musicians. At the time of the announcement, however, no specific artists were mentioned and this left public speculation. It was later announced that Japanese-American singer Ai had recorded "Final Distance" for the project, titled Utada Hikaru no Uta, a tribute album celebrating 15 years since Utada's debut.

A duet version that mixes Utada's vocals recorded in 2001 and Ai's vocals recorded in 2014 was released in Ai's collaboration collection album, The Feat. Best, released on November 2, 2016. This version has a new arrangement, closer to the original song. The duet was released as a preceding download from the album on December 3, 2014.

The covered version received favorable reviews from most music critics. Bradley Stern from MuuMuse was particularly positive about the collaboration, stating "For the most part, the featured musicians on Utada Hikaru no Uta stay faithful to the original records while adding her own unique flare to the production [...] like [Ai]‘s soulfully somber take on “Final Distance,”." The song was performed on MTV Unplugged, along with the single "First Love". Utada has played the song only on one concert tour, this being the Utada United 2006 tour.

== Personnel ==
Credits adapted from the CD single's liner notes.

=== Song credits ===
- Hikaru Utada – songwriting, composition, vocal production, production
- Teruzane Utada – composition, vocal production, production
- Akira Miyake – composition, vocal production, production
- Saito Neko – string arrangement
- Kawano Kei – keyboards, synthesizer, programming, production (track 4)
- Tsumeni Kazuhide – synthesizer
- Yokan – horn (track 4)
- Great Eida Strings – strings
- Recorded by Ugajin Masaaki and Watanabe Syuichi (track 4) at Studio Terra, Tokyo, Japan and Studio Bunkamura, Tokyo, Japan
- Mixed by Goh Hotada at Bunkamura, Tokyo, Japan

=== Cover credits ===
- Kiriya Kazuaki – photographer
- Aoki Katsunori – art direction
- bff – design
- Maeda Eiko – styling
- Kanehara Yakayasu – hair and makeup
- Kimura Masatomo – design production and distribution

== Track listing ==
All tracks are written by Hikaru Utada.

"Final Distance" track listing
No.	Title	Arranger	Length
1.	"Final Distance"	Kei Kawano, Hikaru Utada; Neko Saito (strings arrangement)	5:40
2.	"Distance" (PLANITb Remix)	Russell McNamara	6:15
3.	"Distance" (M-Flo Remix)	Shin Kono (strings arrangement)	5:56
4.	"Distance"	Kei Kawano, Hikaru Utada	5:42
5.	"Distance" (original karaoke)		5:41
6.	"Final Distance" (instrumental)		5:37

== Charts ==
=== Weekly charts ===
Chart (2001)	Peak position
Japan Singles (Oricon)	2

=== Monthly charts ===
Chart (2001)	Peak position
Japan Singles (Oricon)	3

=== Year-end charts ===
Chart (2001)	Position
Japan Singles (Oricon)	24
Taiwan (Yearly Singles Top 100)	44

== Certifications ==
Certifications for "Final Distance"
Region	Certification	Certified units/sales
Japan (RIAJ) Physical sales	Platinum	582,120
