= Utada Hikaru Single Collection Vol. 1 =

Greatest hits album by Hikaru Utada
- Released: March 31, 2004
- Recorded: 1998–2002
- Genre: J-pop; R&B; dance; electronica
- Length: 75:12
- Label: Eastworld; Toshiba-EMI
- Producer: Hikaru Utada; Darkchild; Jimmy Jam & Terry Lewis; Akira Miyake; Sking U

Hikaru Utada chronology
| Deep River (2002) | Utada Hikaru Single Collection Vol. 1 (2004) | Exodus (2004) |

Singles from Utada Hikaru Single Collection Vol.1
- 1. "Colors" Released: January 29, 2003

Utada Hikaru Single Collection Vol. 1 is the first compilation album by Hikaru Utada, released on March 31, 2004. It features all A-sides of their hit singles to that date, including 11 number-one hits and all 15 tracks reached the top 5. The album version was remastered by Ted Jensen. The album was released on iTunes in April 2004.

It sold over 1.4 million copies in its debut week, and became the number one selling album of the year in Japan (Their fourth consecutive time accomplishing this particular milestone, a record in Japan's music history.). This is Utada's longest charting release on any Oricon chart, with a 2-year trajectory and still growing. Utada Hikaru Single Collection Vol. 1 is the 35th highest selling album in Japan of all time. The album is Japan's 21st highest-ranked in debut sales. The album was the 19th best selling album worldwide in 2004.

== Track listing ==
All tracks are written by Hikaru Utada.

| No. | Title | Length |
|---|---|---|
| 1. | "Time Will Tell" (from First Love) | 5:30 |
| 2. | "Automatic" (from First Love) | 5:28 |
| 3. | "Movin' on Without You" (from First Love) | 4:38 |
| 4. | "First Love" (from First Love) | 4:18 |
| 5. | "Addicted to You (Up-In-Heaven Mix)" (from Distance) | 5:19 |
| 6. | "Wait & See (Risk) (Wait & See: リスク, Weito ando Shī: Risuku)" (from Distance) | 4:49 |
| 7. | "For You" (from Distance) | 5:22 |
| 8. | "Time Limit (タイム・リミット, Taimu Rimitto)" (from Distance) | 4:55 |
| 9. | "Can You Keep a Secret?" (from Distance) | 5:08 |
| 10. | "Final Distance" (from Deep River) | 5:40 |
| 11. | "Traveling" (from Deep River) | 5:13 |
| 12. | "Hikari (光)" (from Deep River) | 5:02 |
| 13. | "Sakura Drops (Sakuraドロップス, Sakura Doroppusu)" (from Deep River) | 4:59 |
| 14. | "Letters" (from Deep River) | 4:48 |
| 15. | "Colors" (new single; further included in Ultra Blue) | 3:59 |

== Charts ==
=== Weekly charts ===
| Chart (2004) | Peak position |
|---|---|
| Japanese Hot Albums (Billboard) | 19 |
| Japanese Albums (Oricon) | 1 |
| Japanese Digital Albums (Oricon) | 12 |

=== Monthly charts ===
| Chart (2004) | Peak position |
|---|---|
| Japanese Albums (Oricon) | 1 |

=== Year-end charts ===
| Chart (2004) | Peak position |
|---|---|
| Japanese Albums (Oricon) | 1 |
| Worldwide Albums (IFPI) | 19 |

| Chart (2016) | Position |
|---|---|
| Japan Hot Albums (Billboard) | 69 |

| Chart (2017) | Position |
|---|---|
| Japan Hot Albums (Billboard) | 99 |
| Japan Top Download Albums (Billboard) | 42 |

| Chart (2018) | Position |
|---|---|
| Japan Top Download Albums (Billboard) | 53 |

| Chart (2019) | Position |
|---|---|
| Japan Top Download Albums (Billboard) | 97 |

| Chart (2020) | Position |
|---|---|
| Japan Top Download Albums (Billboard) | 77 |

=== All-time charts ===
| Chart | Peak position |
|---|---|
| Japanese Albums (Oricon) | 35 |

== Sales and certifications ==
| Region | Certification | Certified units/sales |
|---|---|---|
| Japan (RIAJ) CD | 3× Million | 2,622,332 |
| Japan (RIAJ) Digital | Gold | 100,000^{*} |
| South Korea | — | 4,607 |
| Taiwan | — | 150,000 |
^{*} Sales figures based on certification alone.
