= Movin' On Without You =

Single by Hikaru Utada

from the album First Love
- B-side: "B&C"
- Released: February 17, 1999
- Recorded: October 1998
- Genre: R&B; pop; dance-pop; disco
- Length: 4:38
- Label: EMI Music Japan
- Songwriter: Hikaru Utada
- Producer: Hikaru Utada

Hikaru Utada singles chronology
"Automatic" (1998)	"Movin' On Without You" (1999)	"First Love" (1999)

Music video
- "Movin' On Without You" on YouTube

"Movin' On Without You" is a song written and recorded by Japanese–American singer and producer Hikaru Utada. It serves as the second single from their second studio album First Love (1999), and is the first song that Utada wrote and composed by themselves. "Movin' On Without You" was incepted while Utada was attending high school in Tokyo, Japan, during 1997. Utada, who received a recording contract by Toshiba-EMI, also wrote an English-language version of the song, which remains unreleased.

Musically, the song utilizes dance-oriented music from the mid-1990s, and also incorporates R&B music from the parent album as well as house music. Lyrically, the song talks about an independent woman who can thrive outside of a relationship. The song received favorable reception from music critics, who praised its musical arrangement and Utada's vocals and songwriting. Some have dubbed the song a "J-Pop classic" and view it as a memorable song in the Japanese music landscape. An accompanying music video was shot for the single, which featured Utada dancing to the song on a chair in a computer lab.

Commercially, the song was successful in Japan. Both released as an 8 cm and normal compact disc, the song peaked at number five and number one on the Oricon Singles Chart, with the latter format becoming Utada's first number-one single in Japan. To date, the song is their fifth-best selling physical single, with over 1.22 million units sold in the country. Utada has performed "Movin' On Without You" live on several occasions, including their Utada United 2006 tour.

== Background ==
Born and raised in Manhattan, New York City, Hikaru Utada had started singing at a very young age; they were a member of U3, a musical act with their mother Keiko Fuji and father Teruzane. U^{3} released their debut album Star in 1993, with the hope to debut in America; the album failed to gain any recognition or chart positions. Utada's mother was a Japanese enka singer and actress, who released several albums with some topping the Oricon charts during the 1960s and 1970s period, while their father was a Japanese record producer who had contributed to some of Fuji's work. In 1996, the group was rebranded as Cubic U, an R&B project that focused primarily on Hikaru, resulting in the English language album Precious in 1998 with record label Toshiba EMI.

Utada had moved to Tokyo in 1997 to attend Seisen International School and later American School in Japan. During this time, Utada had signed solely with Toshiba EMI and started recording their singles and eventually their then-forthcoming album First Love. Utada, who was fluent in English, was asked if they could write Japanese songs by their record company, Toshiba EMI rather than English language lyrics. This led to the recording sessions for their debut Japanese album, First Love (1999). During the process of creating the tracks and album, Utada desired to become a singer-songwriter rather than a Japanese idol, and occasionally practiced producing and composing their own music. Utada released their first A-side single "Automatic/Time will tell" in 1998, which peaked at number two on the Oricon chart and sold over two million units, becoming their best selling single to date.

== Composition ==
"Movin' On Without You" was written, composed and produced by Utada for their debut album First Love. It was the only track on the album not to have been co-produced by Teruzane Utada or Akira Miyake, who co-produced and co-composed several other songs on the album. The song was programmed, arranged, engineered and organized by Shinichiro Murayama, who also played keyboard and the synthesizer on the track, while the intro and chorus guitar notes are played and written by Yoshiaki Kusaka. The song's recording demos and programming took place in Tokyo, Japan, with Utada recording all from them with assistance from Motoyama Seiji and Ugajin Masaaki.

Musically, "Movin' On Without You" is a disco and house track that was influenced by early 1990s Western dance music, and lasts a total of four minutes and forty-one seconds. The song also incorporates dance-oriented R&B rhythms that were present on Utada's previous single and the parent album, and showcases more of their "fresh" and "comfortable" vocal abilities. CDJournal felt that the song fit as one of the introduction tracks to make the album more "mellow".

== Reception ==
"Movin' On Without You" received critical acclaim from most contemporary music critics who reviewed the track. David Jeffries from AllMusic, who wrote the extended biography of the singer, highlighted the song (viewed as [Untranslated song]) as one of Utada's career and parent album standouts. A reviewer from the online publication CDJournal was positive towards the song, calling it a "speedy dance beat" and praised their lyrical content and vocal delivery for being quite "persuasive" and challenging for a fifteen-year-old. At the 14th Japan Gold Disc Awards, they awarded the song along with "Addicted to You" and "Automatic" their own special Songs of the Year awards.

Commercially, the song proved to be another mammoth success for Utada. The 12cm edition of the single debuted atop the Oricon Singles Chart with 372,170 copies sold in its first week, making it Utada's first chart-topper. The 8cm edition debuted at number five with 101,360 copies sold in its first week. This charted lower than the 8cm version of their previous single "Automatic," which debuted at number four in its first week. The 12cm disc was ranked as the 16th best-selling single of 1999 in Japan, while the 8cm disc was ranked as the 59th. Oricon tabulated the 8cm and 12cm versions separately, but when combined, "Movin' On Without You" was the eighth best-selling single of that fiscal year.

In April 1999, the song was certified million by the Recording Industry Association of Japan (RIAJ) for shipments of a million units in Japan, which became their second consecutive million selling single there. To date, "Movin' On Without You" has sold over 1.22 million units in Japan, which became their second best selling single of all time, just behind their debut single and was listed as one of the best selling singles in Japan. Following the success of their million selling singles, this effort was followed by "Addicted to You", "Wait & See (Risk)", "For You", "Time Limit", "Can You Keep a Secret?" from Distance, "Travelling" from Deep River and "Colors" from Ultra Blue. (Note: According to Oricon, the songs "For You", "Time Limit", "Travelling" and "Colors" did not sell over one million units in Japan but was certified Million by Recording Industry Association of Japan (RIAJ))

== Promotion ==
An accompanying music video was shot for the single, which featured Utada on a chair in a computer lab seeing images including flowers, waves and other digitally enhanced images. It also intercuts to them dancing to the song in a laboratory. The video was later included in the Utada Hikaru Single Clip Collection Vol. 1 (1999) music clip collection.

"Movin' On Without You" has been a constant feature of Utada's live concert set lists. They performed the song during the Luv Live concerts in April 1999, as well as their Bohemian Summer 2000 concert tour and at the Utada Hikaru Unplugged event on August 10, 2001. The song was a part of their Hikaru no 5 residency concerts at the Nippon Budokan in February 2004, their Japan-wide tour Utada United 2006, the overseas tour Utada: In the Flesh 2010 and the December 2010 Wild Life concert series.

== Other versions ==
=== Ayumi Hamasaki version ===
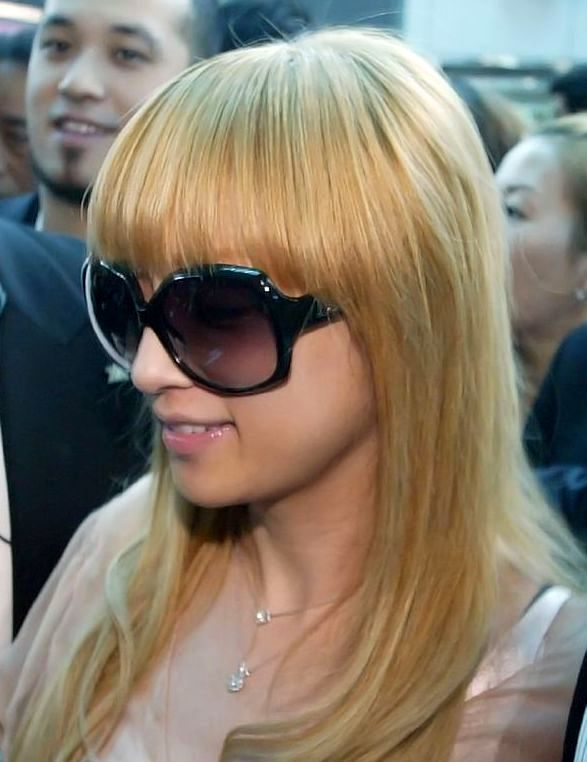
Japanese recording artist Ayumi Hamasaki (pictured) covered the song "Movin' On Without You" for the tribute album Utada Hikaru no Uta.

In November 2014, Universal Music Japan announced a tribute album to Utada's musical works, with their songs covered by a variety of musicians. During the time of the announcement, however, no specific artists were mentioned and this caused public speculation. It was then announced through AramaJapan.com that the artists had been unveiled for the project, now titled Utada Hikaru no Uta, and that the final list included singer-songwriter Ayumi Hamasaki. When the track list was announced, it was revealed that Hamasaki had covered "Movin' On Without You".

Hamasaki's version was produced by Moroccan producer RedOne and his team, who had previously collaborated with Hamasaki on her track "XOXO" from her 2014 album Colours. The song's composition departs from the disco and house music style of Utada's version in favor of a more modern electronic dance music "twist". Lucas Villa of AXS commented that Hamasaki is "no stranger to the dance floor and easily finds her footing among the beats. The queens of J-Pop collide on this sleek remake." Eventually, the song was released as a promotional single from the compilation album on December 9, 2014, by Universal Japan.

The cover version received favorable reception from most music critics. Bradley Stern from MuuMuse was particularly positive towards the collaboration, stating "Happily, the result sounds exactly like something you might expect to hear on one of Ayu's Ayu-mi-x Euro-dance compilations. It's surging, non-stop nostalgic throwback — for both artists involved, really." Because Hamasaki's version was released only as a digital download, it was ineligible to chart on the Oricon Singles Chart, but charted on the Japan Billboard charts. The song peaked at number thirty-six on the Japan Hot 100 chart.

=== Commercials and other versions ===
During the release of the single, it had a tie-in as the Japanese advertising jingle for the Nissan Terrano, which became Utada's first commercial singles for the advert. A demo version of the single was featured on Utada's 15th anniversary album First Love; "Automatic" still remains unreleased.

== Track listing ==
8cm version
No.	Title	Arranger	Length
1.	"Movin' On Without You"	Shin'ichiro Murayama	4:38
2.	"B&C"	Akira Nishihira, Taka & Speedy (rhythm track arrangement)	4:20
3.	"Movin' On Without You" (Original Karaoke)		4:41

12 cm version
No.	Title	Length
1.	"Movin' On Without You"	4:38
2.	"B&C"	4:20
3.	"Movin' On Without You" (Tribal Mix)	4:46

== Charts ==
=== 12cm version ===
Chart (1999)	Peak position
Japan Weekly Singles (Oricon)	1
Japan Monthly Singles (Oricon)	2
Japan Yearly Singles (Oricon)	16

=== 8cm version ===
Chart (1999)	Peak position
Japan Weekly Singles (Oricon)	5
Japan Monthly Singles (Oricon)	9
Japan Yearly Singles (Oricon)	59

== Certifications and sales ==
Region	Certification	Certified units/sales
Japan (RIAJ)	Million	1,226,580
