= Hikaru Utada albums discography =

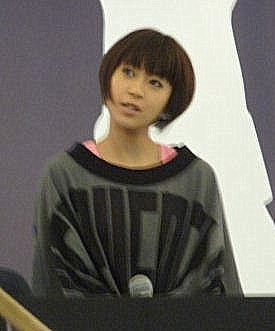
- Utada at Sephora in New York City (2009)
- Studio albums: 11
- Extended plays: 1
- Live albums: 2
- Compilation albums: 5
- Video albums: 11

The album discography of Japanese-American singer Hikaru Utada consists of eleven studio albums, one extended play, two live albums, five compilation albums, and eleven video albums. Utada began as a musician in the early 1990s as a member of U^{3}, a family unit made up of them, their mother Junko Utada, also known as 1970s enka singer Keiko Fuji, and their father, musical producer Teruzane Utada. U^{3} released their debut album Star in 1993, with the hope to debut in America. In 1996, the group was rebranded as Cubic U, an R&B project focusing on Hikaru Utada, resulting in the English language album Precious in 1998 with record label Toshiba EMI.

Utada continued releasing music with Toshiba EMI, debuting as a Japanese-language musician in December 1998 with the single "Automatic" / "Time Will Tell", and releasing their debut album First Love in 1999. The album was a phenomenal success, becoming the most sold album of all time in Japan. Their second album Distance was released on March 28, 2001, on the same day as singer Ayumi Hamasaki's compilation album A Best. Both sold over three million copies in their first week, becoming the respective highest and second highest selling albums in Japan in a single week.

Before the release of their third album Deep River (2002), Utada signed with American record label Island Def Jam and music corporation Universal to release English language globally. This resulted in their global debut album Exodus (2004), under the mononym Utada. Utada returned to the Japanese market with their albums Ultra Blue (2006) and Heart Station (2008). Their song "Flavor of Life" (2007), the theme song for the drama Hana Yori Dango Returns, sold over eight million downloads, and became the second most downloaded song globally of 2007 after Avril Lavigne's "Girlfriend".

Utada released their second global English album This Is the One in 2009. After a compilation album featuring an extended play of new material, Utada Hikaru Single Collection Vol. 2 (2010), Utada went on an extended hiatus for personal reasons, however they briefly returned to release the song "Sakura Nagashi" for the animated film Evangelion: 3.0 You Can (Not) Redo (2012). They made their official return in 2016 with the album Fantôme, again to commercial and critical success.

== Albums ==
=== Studio albums ===
List of studio albums, with selected chart positions
Title	Album details	Peak positions					Sales (Note: Sales provided by Oricon database and are rounded to the nearest thousand copies. All sales figures are for physical copies, unless otherwise noted.)	Certifications
Title	Album details	JPN	JPN Hot	KOR Intl. (Note: References for Gaon: Single Collection Vol. 2. References for Gaon Overseas: First Love, Distance, Deep River, Single Collection Vol. 1, Ultra Blue, Single Collection Vol. 2, Heart Station.)	US	US World	Sales	Certifications
Precious (as Cubic U)	Released: January 28, 1998 (JPN, US); Label: Free Bass, Toshiba EMI; Formats: CD, download	2	—	—	—	—	JPN: 702,060	RIAJ: 3× Platinum (Note: Received a 2× Platinum certification for 800,000 copies, however the 2× Platinum threshold was redefined as 500,000 copies in 2003.)
First Love	Released: March 10, 1999 (JPN); Label: Toshiba EMI, Eastworld; Formats: CD, DVD, cassette, LP, download	1	80	62	—	—	WW: 9,910,000; JPN: 7,672,120; KOR: 4,244	RIAJ: 8× Million
Distance	Released: March 28, 2001 (JPN); Label: Toshiba EMI, Eastworld; Formats: CD, cassette, LP, download	1	—	70	—	—	WW: 5,490,000; JPN: 4,472,353	RIAJ: 4× Million
Deep River	Released: June 19, 2002 (JPN); Label: Toshiba EMI, Eastworld; Formats: CD, cassette, LP, download	1	—	67	—	—	JPN: 3,604,588	RIAJ: 3× Million
Exodus (as Utada)	Released: September 8, 2004 (JPN); Label: Island Def Jam; Formats: CD, cassette, download	1	—	—	160	—	JPN: 1,074,393; US: 55,000	RIAJ: Million
Ultra Blue	Released: June 14, 2006 (JPN); Label: Toshiba-EMI, Eastworld; Formats: CD, download	1	—	97	—	—	JPN: 909,113	RIAJ: Million
Heart Station	Released: March 19, 2008 (JPN); Label: EMI Music Japan, Eastworld; Formats: CD, download	1	—	89	—	—	JPN: 1,011,373; KOR: 4,132	RIAJ: Million
This Is the One (as Utada)	Released: March 14, 2009 (JPN); Label: Island; Formats: CD, download	3	—	—	69	—	JPN: 242,657; US: 16,000	RIAJ: Platinum
Fantôme	Released: September 28, 2016 (JPN); Label: Virgin; Formats: SHM-CD, download	1	1	47	—	1	WW: 1,000,000; JPN: 702,347; JPN: 100,000 (dig.); US: 3,500	RIAJ: 3× Platinum (phy.); Gold (dig.)
Hatsukoi	Released: June 27, 2018 (JPN); Label: Epic; Formats: CD, download, LP	1	1	4	—	3	JPN: 381,520; JPN: 100,000 (dig.)	RIAJ: Platinum (phy.); Gold (dig.)
Bad Mode	Released: January 19, 2022 (JPN); Label: Epic; Formats: CD, download, CD/DVD	1	1	—	—	—	JPN: 168,000; JPN: 35,000 (dig.)	RIAJ: Gold (phy.)
"—" denotes an item that did not chart or was not released in that territory.

=== Compilation albums ===
List of compilation albums, with selected chart positions
Title	Album details	Peak positions			Sales	Certifications
Title	Album details	JPN	KOR	KOR Intl.	Sales	Certifications
Utada Hikaru Single Collection Vol. 1	Released: March 31, 2004; Label: Toshiba EMI, Eastworld; Formats: CD, digital download	1	—	28	JPN: 2,621,000	RIAJ: 3× Million (phy.); Gold (dig.)
Utada Hikaru Single Collection Vol. 2	Released: November 24, 2010; Label: EMI Music Japan, Eastworld; Formats: 2CD, 2CD/DVD, digital download	1	12	1	JPN: 444,100	RIAJ: 2× Platinum
Utada the Best (as Utada)	Released: November 24, 2010; Label: Universal; Formats: CD, digital download	12	—	—	JPN: 22,000	
Utada Hikaru Single Collection Vol. 1+2 HD	Released: December 9, 2014; Label: Virgin; Formats: USB	—	—	—	JPN: 5,000	
Science Fiction	Released: April 10, 2024; Label: Epic, USM Japan; Formats: CD, digital download, streaming	1	—	—	JPN: 330,244; JPN: 39,633 (dig.)	RIAJ: Platinum (phy.)
"—" denotes items which were released before the creation of the G-Music or Gaon Charts, or items that did not chart.

=== Live albums ===
List of live albums, with selected chart positions
Title	Album details	Peak positions
Title	Album details	JPN
Hikaru Utada Live Sessions from Air Studios	Released: June 6, 2022; Label: Epic; Formats: Digital download, streaming	— (Note: Hikaru Utada Live Sessions from Air Studios did not enter Oricon Album chart, but peaked at number 3 on Oricon Digital Album chart.)
Hikaru Utada Science Fiction Tour 2024	Released: December 11, 2024; Label: Epic; Formats: 2 CD, Digital download, streaming	—
"—" denotes items that were ineligible to chart because no physical edition was released.

=== Other albums ===
List of other albums, with selected chart positions
Title	Album details	Peak positions	Sales
Title	Album details	JPN	Sales
Star (among U^{3})	Released: September 17, 1993 (JPN); Label: Century Records; Formats: CD, digital download	33 (Note: Charted in 1999.)	JPN: 55,000

== Extended plays ==
List of extended plays, with selected chart positions
Title	Extended play details	Peak positions					Sales	Certifications
Title	Extended play details	JPN	JPN Hot	FRA	SCO	US World	Sales	Certifications
One Last Kiss	Released: March 9, 2021; Label: Epic; Formats: CD, digital download, streaming, vinyl	2	1	112	58	12	JPN: 178,284; JPN: 42,000 (dig.)	RIAJ: Gold (phy.)

== Video albums ==
=== Music video albums ===
List of media, with selected chart positions
Title	Album details	Peak positions
Title	Album details	JPN DVD
Utada Hikaru Single Clip Collection Vol. 1	Released: December 12, 1999; Label: Toshiba-EMI; Formats: VHS, DVD, VCD	1
Utada Hikaru Single Clip Collection Vol. 2	Released: September 27, 2001; Label: Toshiba-EMI; Formats: DVD, VHS, VCD	1
Utada Hikaru Single Clip Collection Vol. 3+	Released: September 30, 2002; Label: Toshiba-EMI; Formats: DVD, VCD	3
Utada Hikaru Single Clip Collection Vol. 4	Released: September 27, 2006; Label: EMI Music Japan; Formats: DVD	2

=== Live concert video albums ===
List of media, with selected chart positions
Title	Album details	Peak positions			Certifications
Title	Album details	JPN DVD	JPN Blu-ray	TWN (Note: Positions were taken from 2005 week 37 for Single Collection Vol. 1, 2006 week 24 for Ultra Blue, 2008 week 13 for Heart Station, 2008 week 21 for "Prisoner of Love", 2009 week 12 and 2009 week 13 for This Is the One, 2010 week 50 for Single Collection Vol. 2, 2011 week 23 for Wild Life, 2014 week 50 for First Love.)	Certifications
Bohemian Summer 2000	Released: December 19, 2000; Label: Toshiba EMI; Formats: DVD, VHS, VCD, Blu-ray	1	10	—	
Utada Hikaru Unplugged	Released: November 11, 2001; Label: Toshiba EMI; Formats: DVD, VHS, Blu-ray	1	14	—	
UH Live Streaming 20-dai wa Ikeike! (20代はイケイケ!, Nijū-dai wa Ikeike!; "Your 20s Are Funky!")	Released: March 29, 2003; Label: Toshiba EMI; Formats: DVD	3	—	—	RIAJ: Gold
Utada Hikaru in Budokan 2004: Hikaru no 5 (ヒカルの5; "Hikaru's 5")	Released: July 28, 2004; Label: Toshiba EMI; Formats: DVD, Blu-ray	1	12	—	RIAJ: Gold
Utada United 2006	Released: December 20, 2006; Label: EMI Music Japan; Formats: DVD, Blu-ray	14	6	—	
Wild Life: Live at the Yokohama Arena 2010	Released: April 6, 2011; Label: EMI Music Japan; Formats: DVD, Blu-ray	9	2	4	
Utada: In the Flesh 2010	Released: December 8, 2013; Label: Universal; Formats: Digital download, Blu-ray	—	—	—	
Hikaru Utada Laughter in the Dark Tour 2018	Released: June 26, 2019; Label: Epic Records; Formats: DVD, Blu-ray, digital download, streaming	—	2	—	
Hikaru Utada Science Fiction Tour 2024	Released: December 11, 2024; Label: Epic; Formats: Blu-ray	—	2	—	
Luv Live	Released: January 8, 2025; Label: USM Japan; Formats: Blu-ray	—	8	—	
Hikaru Utada Live Sessions from Air Studios	Released: January 8, 2025; Label: Epic; Formats: Blu-ray	—	19	—	
"—" denotes items which were released before the creation of the G-Music Chart, or were not released physically.
