= Sakura Drops =

- "Sakura Drops" / "Letters" cover.

Single by Hikaru Utada

from the album Deep River
- Released: May 9, 2002
- Recorded: 2002
- Genre: R&B, J-pop
- Length: 4:59
- Label: Toshiba EMI
- Songwriter: Hikaru Utada
- Producers: Kei Kawano, Akira Miyake, Teruzane Utada

Hikaru Utada singles chronology
"Hikari" (2002)	"Sakura Drops" and "Letters" (2002)	"Colors" (2003)

Music video
- "Sakura Drops" on YouTube

"Sakura Drops" (Japanese: SAKURAドロップス, Hepburn: Sakura Doroppusu; "Cherry Blossom Drops") is a song recorded by Japanese-American musician Hikaru Utada for their fourth studio album Deep River (2002). It was released as a double A-side single with the song "Letters" on May 9, 2002.

== Background and development ==
Since they debuted as a musician in 1998, Utada had worked as the primary or sole songwriter for their music. Beginning with their second album Distance (2001), Utada began to co-arrange songs, such as "Wait & See (Risk)", "Distance" and "Kettobase!" The bonus track on Distance, "Hayatochi-Remix", was arranged entirely by Utada. In March 2002, Hikaru Utada released "Hikari", the theme song for the game Kingdom Hearts. "Sakura Drops" was first announced as the theme song for the drama First Love in mid-February.

== Promotion and release ==
The song was used as the theme song for the TBS drama First Love, starring Atsuro Watabe and Kyoko Fukada. This was Utada's third composition to be used as a drama theme song, after "First Love" was used for Majo no Jōken (1999), and "Can You Keep a Secret?" for Hero (2001). The drama first aired in Japan on April 17, 2002.

On May 13, 2002, Utada performed the song live at Hey! Hey! Hey! Music Champ, a week before they performed the single's second A-side "Letters".

Utada performed the song during their Hikaru no 5 Budokan residency show in 2004, at their Utada United 2006 Japanese tour, during their international tour Utada: In the Flesh 2010, and at their two date concert series Wild Life in December 2010.

The song was noticed for its digital success in the burgeoning ringtone market in Japan, with 29% of the revenue they had received from the song coming from ringtones.

== Music video ==
A music video was released for the song, directed by their then husband Kazuaki Kiriya, who had directed all of their music videos since "Final Distance" (2001). The video clip was a mix of strongly colored CGI imagery of a fantasy forest and animals, as well as scenes of Utada standing in this forest. The imagery seen in the video was inspired by the works of Edo period artist Itō Jakuchū.

== Usage and covers ==
For the Disney on Ice production Let's Party! which debuted in 2009, an English language version of the song was used as a part of the set. After becoming aware of Disney's usage of the song in 2012, Utada was surprised, but honored that Disney had chosen to use their song.

In 2007, the band Kinmokusei covered "Sakura Drops" for their cherry blossom-themed album Sakura, and similarly in 2008 by Sotte Bosse for Blooming E.P.. In 2014, "Sakura Drops" was recorded by Yōsui Inoue for Utada Hikaru no Uta, a tribute album celebrating 15 years since Utada's debut. It was released as a preceding download from the album on December 3, 2014, and was commercially successful enough to reach number 68 on the Billboard Japan Hot 100 chart and number 11 on the Japanese Adult Contemporary Airplay chart. In Spring 2015, Inoue's cover recharted on the Adult Contemporary Airplay at number 41.

== Critical reception ==
Critical reception to the song was positive. Hayashi of Ongaku DB noted that the song was simultaneously elaborate and simple, praising the balance of this sound with a humble melody and Utada's passionate vocals, feeling that this mix was "natural, but at the same time miraculous". Akiyoshi Sekine of CDData praised the song's "simple but deep world view", while noting its "oriental taste" and "graceful sense of the season". Kanako Hanakawa of Backstage Pass felt that the cherry blossom imagery worked especially well because of Utada's vocal qualities.

CDJournal reviewers called the song "simple and fresh", and were surprised at how much more dark their style was in "Sakura Drops", considering how dark much of their music was already. They praised their vocal style and song arrangement, noting the "gleaming sound effects" and "tough melody" as highlights. Masamichi Yoshihiro of Yeah!! J-Pop! called the song a "classic pop tune", and noted the "J-Pop-style approach" of "Sakura Drops", also shared with their previous single "Hikari", which was stronger than anything seen before in their music, as opposed to their earlier R&B/club styled songs. He likened the song to those of Yumi Matsutoya, feeling its "straightforward emotional expression" and "pop arrangement" left the biggest impression. He felt that Utada's signature lyrics and vocals made the song stand out over other pop-genre songs.

== Track listings ==
All tracks are written by Hikaru Utada.

"Sakura Drops" / "Letters" single
No.	Title	Arranger	Length
1.	"Sakura Drops"	Utada, Kei Kawano	5:01
2.	"Letters"	Kawano, Utada	4:48
3.	"Sakura Drops" (Original Karaoke)	Utada, Kei Kawano	5:01
4.	"Letters" (Original Karaoke)	Kawano, Utada	4:48
Total length:			9:59

All tracks are written by Hikaru Utada.

Sonic Sprout Mix promo vinyl record
No.	Title	Arranger	Length
1.	"Sakura Drops" (Sonic Sprout Mix)	Yuzuru Tomita for Mintmania	5:01
2.	"Sakura Drops" (Sonic Sprout Mix) (Instrumental)	Yuzuru Tomita for Mintmania	5:01
Total length:			10:02

== Personnel ==
Personnel details were sourced from Deep River's liner notes booklet.

- Hironori Akiyama – electric guitar
- Yuichiro Larry Honda – guitar sample
- Goh Hotoda – recording
- Kanno – guitar sample
- Tsunemi Kawahide – synthesizer programming
- Kei Kawano – acoustic piano, arrangement, keyboards, programming
- Atsushi Matsui – recording
- Akira Miyake – production
- Masaaki Ugajin – recording
- Hikaru Utada – arrangement, producer, writing, vocals
- Teruzane "Sking" Utada – production

== Charts ==
Chart (2002)	Peak position
Japan Oricon weekly singles: "Sakura Drops" / "Letters"	1
Chart (2012)	Peak position
Japan Billboard Japan Hot 100	74
Chart (2014)	Peak position
Japan Billboard Adult Contemporary Airplay	23
Chart (2015)	Peak position
Japan Billboard Japan Hot 100	79
Japan Billboard Adult Contemporary Airplay	21

== Sales and certifications ==
Chart	Amount
Oricon physical sales: "Sakura Drops" / "Letters"	687,000
RIAJ physical certification: "Sakura Drops" / "Letters"	2× Platinum (800,000)
RIAJ cellphone download certification	Gold (100,000)

== Release history ==
Region	Date	Format	Distributing label	Catalog code
Japan	May 9, 2002	CD single	Toshiba EMI	TOCT-4381
Taiwan	May 9, 2002	CD single	Gold Typhoon	55088529
Japan	April 1, 2004	Digital download	Toshiba EMI	
South Korea	September 30, 2005	Digital download	Universal Music Korea	
