= Traveling (song) =

- CD and digital cover

Single by Hikaru Utada

from the album Deep River
- Released: November 28, 2001
- Recorded: 2001
- Studio: Bunkamura Studio, Shibuya, Tokyo
- Genre: Dance-pop
- Length: 5:17
- Label: Toshiba EMI
- Songwriter: Hikaru Utada
- Producers: Hikaru Utada; Teruzane Utada; Akira Miyake

Hikaru Utada singles chronology
"Final Distance" (2001)	"Traveling" (2001)	"Hikari" (2002)

Music video
- "Traveling" on YouTube

"Traveling" (stylized in lowercase) is a song recorded by Japanese-American singer Hikaru Utada. It was released on November 28, 2001, as the second single from their fourth studio album, Deep River (2002). The track was written and composed by Utada, and production was handled by Utada, their father Teruzane Utada, and long-time collaborator Akira Miyake. Musically, "Traveling" is a dance-pop song, influenced by house music. Lyrically, it discusses human activities and dreams.

"Traveling" received positive reviews from most music critics. Many selected it as one of Utada's best singles, and complimented its production and dance-oriented composition. It was also successful in Japan, peaking at number one on the Oricon Singles Chart and Tokyo Broadcasting System's (TBS) Count Down TV singles chart. It was certified in two categories by the Recording Industry Association of Japan (RIAJ), and was the second best selling single of the year 2002. A music video was filmed for "Traveling" in 2001, featuring Utada as a hostess travelling on a spacecraft with passengers. Utada has performed the song on several of their tours, including Utada in Bokuhan (2004), Utada United 2006, and Laughter in the Dark (2018).

== Background and release ==
"Traveling" was written and composed by Utada, and production was handled by Utada, their father Teruzane Utada, and long-time collaborator Akira Miyake. This was Utada's first original single to have been handled by Utada, their father, and Miyake since their single releases from the album First Love (1999); they had primarily worked with American producers, such as Rodney Jerkins, Jimmy Jam & Terry Lewis for their second studio album Distance (2001). The song included live instrumentation by Saito Mitsutaka, who played the bass guitar, and Tsunemi Kazuhide, who played synthesizers. The song was arranged by Utada and Kawano Kei, and was recorded and mixed by Ugajin Masaaki and Matsui Atushi in 2001 at Bunkamura Studio, Shibuya, Tokyo. It was released as the second single from Utada's fourth studio and third Japanese language album, Deep River (2002). Since then, the song has been remastered and re-released twice; the first on March 31, 2004, for Utada's first greatest hits album Utada Hikaru Single Collection Vol. 1 (2004), and the second time on December 9, 2014.

It was released as a CD single in both Japan and China. Both formats included the original track, two remixes by PlanitB and Bahiatronic, plus the instrumental version. The artwork for the CD singles were photographed by Utada's husband at the time, Kazuaki Kiriya. It has a close-up shot of Utada in front of a multi-colored background. A promotional 12" vinyl was released by Toshiba-EMI in December 2001, and included both the remixed tracks. The vinyl's artwork was a screenshot taken by Kiriya. Toshiba-EMI released "Traveling" as a DVD single on January 30, 2002, which included the "behind the scenes" video and the music video.

== Composition ==
Musically, "Traveling" is a dance-pop song, influenced by house music. Lyrically, it discusses human activities and dreams. Kano, editor in chief for Rockin'On Japan magazine noted elements of house music in the song's composition. Kano felt that although the song themes are about dreams and nightmares, he believed it should "be taken seriously" as he felt it intertwined with reality. CD Journal staff members wrote that the song had a "speedy dance beat".

== Critical response ==
"Traveling" received very positive reviews from music critics. AllMusic's David Jeffries selected the song as one of Utada's best singles. Fellow Japanese recording artist Kyary Pamyu Pamyu contributed to The Guardian's music playlist columns, and highlighted "Traveling" as one of Utada's best songs; she further stated in a detailed review: "People living outside Japan will also enjoy her creativity. It's pop and yet a little bit dark and scary. I like the chemistry." In another positive review, a critic from CD Journal complimented the dance composition, and felt the lyrical content was the best feature of the track.

=== Accolades ===
At the 16th Japan Gold Disc Awards, Utada won the Song of the Year award for "Traveling"; they had also won another similar award that year for their single "Can You Keep a Secret?". Similarly, Utada also received the Silver Award recognition at the 2003 Japanese Society for Rights of Authors, Composers and Publishers Awards (JASRAC). In December 2015, in honor of Utada's comeback into the music business, Japanese website Goo.ne.jp hosted a poll for fans to rank their favourite songs by Utada out of 25 positions; the poll was held in only twenty-four hours, and thousands submitted their votes. As a result, "Traveling" was ranked at number seven with 71 votes in total.

== Commercial performance ==
Commercially, "Traveling" was a success in Japan. It debuted at number one on the Oricon Singles Chart, with 277,100 units sold in its first week, becoming Utada's seventh number one single. It stayed at number one for two consecutive weeks, and spent a total of 20 weeks on that chart. It also debuted at number one on Tokyo Broadcasting System's (TBS) Count Down TV chart during the chart week of December 8, 2001, and stayed on that chart for 20 weeks. By the end of 2002, the single was ranked at number two on Oricon's Annual 2002 chart, just behind Ayumi Hamasaki's extended play H; it sold 856,140 units by the end of the year. This made it the second highest selling single by a female artist, just behind Hamasaki's entry, but was the highest selling single that did not include any other B-side or A-side tracks. (Note: Although Ayumi Hamasaki's single H charted on the Oricon Singles Chart, it is registered as an extended play as it features three original tracks, its instrumental versions, and was not titled by one of those three songs. This entitles it as an EP, making "Traveling" by Utada the best selling original single. However, the Oricon Style database ranked H the best selling single as it was the only entry on the Oricon Singles Chart to reach over one million sales.) "Traveling" was ranked at number 26 and number 39 on TBS' Annual Chart for 2001 and 2002, respectively. The single was certified million by the Recording Industry Association of Japan (RIAJ) for physical shipments of one million units.

In 2009, "Traveling" entered the Billboard Adult Alternative Radio Songs chart at number 81 during the chart week of April 6. It re-entered the chart during the chart week of May 6, 2015, peaking at number 75. It was certified gold by RIAJ for cellphone downloads of 100,000 units. According to the Oricon Style database, it is Utada's sixth-highest selling single.

The DVD single was a success on the Oricon DVD Chart, peaking at number one. The Oricon Style database ranks the DVD single as Utada's second best selling DVD, just behind the live release of her Bohemian Summer 2000 Concert tour. As of May 2016, it is the 51st best selling DVD in Japan, selling over 820,000 units.

== Music video ==
An accompanying music video was directed by Kazuaki Kiriya. It opens with the camera traveling through a tunnel full of lights, and includes the song's title and Utada's name. For the first part of the song, Utada sings into a microphone while walking inside the head of a spacecraft. The spacecraft exits the station, and flies over a futuristic cityscape. The first verse has Utada as a hostess on the spacecraft, helping and serving the passengers in a dancing manner; the passengers are wearing theatrical clothing and headpieces that cover their faces. During the pre-chorus, Utada sings in front of a forest-like backdrop, whilst a stop-motion animation of her walks through the woods, observing disfigured creatures. The chorus has Utada and the passengers marching across a bridge, while continuous intercut scenes of Utada outside a party are seen.

During the second verse, the spacecraft travels past the Moon, whilst Utada cleans up the mess the passengers left on their tables. By the second pre-chorus, several passengers play ping pong, as Utada exercises. The second chorus has Utada dancing inside a party, whilst intercut scenes of different stop motion animations are seen. In the bridge section, it has a close-up of Utada in front of a forest-like backdrop again, and also has Utada sitting on a swing. The final chorus has the spacecraft falling onto the ground, and creates a vast field of flowers, trees, and grass. The final scene has the camera zooming out of the spacecraft next to a tree, riddled with vines and flowers. The music video and the behind the scenes video were included on her DVD compilation Single Clip Collection Vol. 3 (2002).

The video was praised by critics and was recognized at several award ceremonies. Japanese recording artist Kyary Pamyu Pamyu wrote for The Guardian, and said that the video "is a strong interpretation of the music." She also praised the video's creativity. At the 17th Japan Gold Disc Awards, "Traveling" won the Music Video of the Year trophy.

== Live performances and promotion ==
The single has been performed on several of Utada's concert tours. Its first performance was in 2004, during their Bokuhan concert tour. It appeared on the live DVD, which was released on July 28, 2004. It was included on Utada's debut English concert tour named Utada United, which was later included on the live DVD, released on December 20, 2006. The song was performed during Utada's two date concert series Wild Life in December 2010. Since the track's release, it has appeared on three compilation releases: Utada Hikaru Single Collection Vol. 1 (2004), its 2014 remastered version, and a special bundle of the compilation and the vol. 2 collection on a USB drive.

== Track listings and formats ==
- CD single
1. "Traveling" – 5:17
2. "Traveling" (PlanitB Remix) – 10:35
3. "Traveling" (Bahiatronic Remix) – 6:42
4. "Traveling" (Instrumental) – 5:17
- 12-inch vinyl
1. "Traveling" (PlanitB Remix) – 10:35
2. "Traveling" (Bahiatronic Remix) – 6:42
- DVD single
1. "Traveling" (Behind the scenes video)
2. "Traveling" (Music video)
- Japanese digital EP
1. "Traveling" – 5:17
2. "Traveling" (PlanitB Remix) – 10:35
3. "Traveling" (Bahiatronic Remix) – 6:42
4. "Traveling" (Instrumental) – 5:17

== Charts ==
=== Weekly charts ===
Original version
Chart (2001–2002)	Peak position
Japan Singles (Oricon)	1
Japan Count Down TV Chart (TBS)	1

Chart (2015)	Peak position
Japan Adult Alternative Radio Songs (Billboard)	75

2024 re-recording
Chart (2024)	Peak position
Japan (Japan Hot 100)	27

=== Year-end charts ===
2001 year-end chart performance for "Traveling"
Chart (2001)	Position
Japan Count Down TV Chart (TBS)	26

2002 year-end chart performance for "Traveling"
Chart (2002)	Position
Japan Singles (Oricon)	2
Japan Count Down TV Chart (TBS)	39

== DVD charts ==
=== Charts ===
Chart (2001–2002)	Peak position
Japan Daily Chart (Oricon)	1
Japan Weekly Chart (Oricon)	1

=== All-time chart ===
Chart	Peak position
Japan (Oricon)	51

== Certifications ==
Region	Certification	Certified units/sales
Japan (RIAJ) Physical single	Million	1,000,000^{^}
Japan (RIAJ) Full-length ringtone	Gold	100,000^{*}
Japan DVD	—	820,000
Streaming
Japan (RIAJ)	Gold	50,000,000^{†}
^{*} Sales figures based on certification alone.^{^} Shipments figures based on certification alone.^{†} Streaming-only figures based on certification alone.

== Release history ==
Region	Date	Format	Label
Japan	November 28, 2001	CD single; digital download	Toshiba-EMI
China	November 28, 2001	CD single	Meika Music
Australia	December 9, 2014	"Traveling"; Remastered digital download (Note: Neither the EP for "Traveling" or the parent album Deep River were released in these regions below; taken from her remastered album Utada Hikaru Single Collection Vol. 1 (2003).)	Virgin Music
New Zealand	December 9, 2014	"Traveling"; Remastered digital download	Virgin Music
United Kingdom	December 9, 2014	"Traveling"; Remastered digital download	Virgin Music
Germany	December 9, 2014	"Traveling"; Remastered digital download	Virgin Music
Ireland	December 9, 2014	"Traveling"; Remastered digital download	Virgin Music
France	December 9, 2014	"Traveling"; Remastered digital download	Virgin Music
Spain	December 9, 2014	"Traveling"; Remastered digital download	Virgin Music
Taiwan	December 9, 2014	"Traveling"; Remastered digital download	Virgin Music
United States	December 9, 2014	"Traveling"; Remastered digital download	Virgin Music
Canada	December 9, 2014	"Traveling"; Remastered digital download	Virgin Music
