= Deep River (Hikaru Utada album) =

Studio album by Hikaru Utada
- Released: June 19, 2002
- Recorded: 2001–2002
- Studio: Studio Terra; Bunkamura Studio
- Genre: J-pop; R&B; alt-rock; techno; ethereal pop
- Length: 54:54
- Label: Eastworld; Toshiba EMI
- Producer: Hikaru Utada; Akira Miyake; Teruzane Sking

Hikaru Utada chronology
Distance (2001)	Deep River (2002)	Utada Hikaru Single Collection Vol. 1 (2004)

Singles from Deep River
- 1. "Final Distance" Released: July 25, 2001; 2. "Traveling" Released: November 28, 2001; 3. "Hikari" Released: March 20, 2002; 4. "Sakura Drops / Letters" Released: May 9, 2002

Deep River is the fourth studio album by Japanese-American singer Hikaru Utada. It was released via Toshiba EMI on June 19, 2002. The title of the album, as well as its title track, was inspired by the novel Deep River by Shusaku Endo. Utada wrote and co-produced the majority of the record, and unlike their previous album Distance (2001), they worked primarily with Japanese collaborator Akira Miyake and Teruzane Utada. Musically, Deep River is widely noted by fans and critics as the transition state from Utada's earlier style, R&B, to ethereal pop.

Music critics praised Deep River's production and Utada's experimental approach to their sound, and the album and its content received numerous awards and accolades. Commercially, the album attained meteoric success. In Japan, it debuted at number one on the Oricon Albums Chart and was certified triple million by the Recording Industry Association of Japan (RIAJ) for selling over three million copies. The album is listed as the eighth highest-selling album in Japanese music history.

To promote the album, Utada released four singles: "Final Distance," "Traveling," "Hikari" and "Sakura Drops / Letters." All four of them performed well in Japan, with the second single "Traveling" becoming the album's most commercially successful track. The album's third single "Hikari" and its English-language version "Simple & Clean" served as the theme song for Square's action role-playing video game Kingdom Hearts (2002), and is their most well-known single internationally. Along with the four singles, the song "Play Ball" was released as a radio single, and the album's title track received a music video. Utada also went on promotional tours throughout Japan, and a video collection titled Utada Hikaru Single Clip Collection Vol. 3 was released, which included all of the album's music videos.

== Background and content ==
On March 28, 2001, Utada released Distance, their third studio album. It serves as the follow-up to their highly successful major-label debut First Love (1999). Distance was a critical and commercial success in Japan, with the highest first-week sales of all time at the time (before Adele's 25), and eventually becoming the fourth best-selling album in the country. It also spawned a series of million-selling singles in Japan, with the Jimmy Jam & Terry Lewis produced "Addicted to You" becoming the most successful of the bunch.

After finishing the record's promotional tour, Utada attended Columbia University, taking a leave of absence in January 2001. In February 2002, they announced that they had signed an exclusive contract with the record label Island Def Jam in New York. During that time, Utada began working on a new album. The record's production was temporarily halted when they were diagnosed with a benign ovarian tumour, which was successfully removed; they resumed work after recovering from surgery. Utada wrote and co-produced the majority of Deep River, but unlike Distance, they worked primarily with Japanese producers Akira Miyake and Teruzane. The album was produced in about a year, the shortest period of development for an album in their career. In an interview at the time, Utada said, "Maybe it was because I felt that I had to make it in a hurry now. I thought it could only be done by me now. I know I'm changing rapidly, so...."

Akira Miyake, who had been involved in the creation of Utada's music since their debut, attributed their increased pace of songwriting to "their budding professionalism." Utada also said that the album is full of their own "color" as they were fully involved in the arrangements. Utada stated that "being unique is what I'm aiming for," but that they didn't want to go so far as to be "unrecognized by everyone." In a previous interview with Jun Kano, Kano had said, "Rock isn't about not needing anyone to understand," and when Radiohead released their album Amnesiac, Kano had said, "Up until then, we'd made music that was easy to understand, and we valued our desire to connect with everyone's ears and tastes." He felt a sense of empathy and relief when he heard these things. He also felt a sense of trust in his listeners, which allowed him to relax a little in his subsequent productions.

== Composition ==
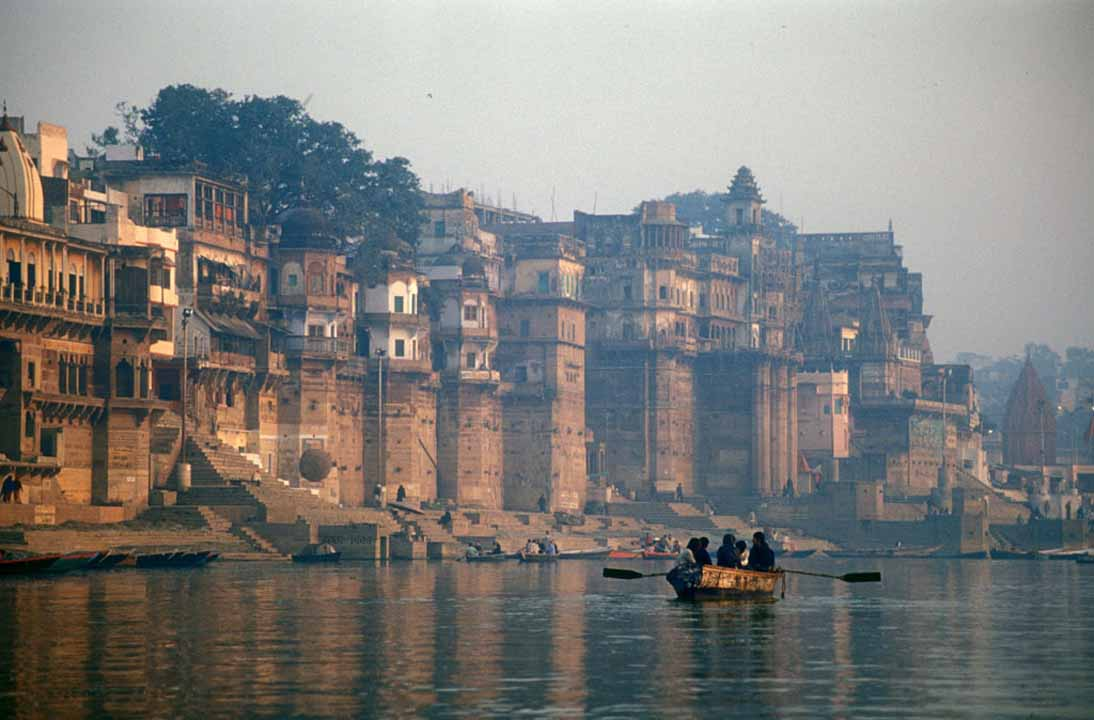
The Ganges River (Varanasi), one of the themes of Deep River

The musical composition of Deep River is an evident departure from the templated Americanized R&B sound of Utada's blockbuster album Distance, and is considered the transition from Utada's earlier style to ethereal pop music.

The album opener "Sakura Drops" is a mid-tempo ballad inspired by the oriental flavor of "cherry blossoms" and the gentle feeling of the season, and the arrangement by Utada is particularly noteworthy, blending psychedelic tones naturally with an exotic, sweeping melody. Utada also noted that the "two-step, half-finished" beat is a fine example of the intense emotional ups and downs of the song. The song "Traveling," which Utada says was intended to be "light and easy to understand" and "a cheerful song with a groove," is one of the most unique songs on the album, with its sophisticated house beat and caricature-like lyrics that also quote a famous passage from The Tale of the Heike. The lyrics are known for being difficult to understand, and Yosui Inoue finds "the destructive impulse, nihilism, and momentary moments behind the humor" in the lyrics.

"Shiawase ni Narou" features a western approach to R&B music in its light tempo, with a simple and unrefined piano, and also quotes the melody of Beethoven's "Für Elise" in the latter half of the song. It has also been pointed out that this is "a quotation as a foreshadowing of tragedy" since the background of the composition of "Für Elise" was "a love affair with an aristocratic lady that could not be fulfilled." The album's title track, "Deep River", uses a sitar in both the intro and outro; the song was inspired by Shusaku Endo's Deep River, which is about the Ganges River and indigenous beliefs in India. "Letters" features Latin-style rhythms and a melody that spirals upward. It is a "hard-edged romantic" song with a "fierceness" according to Utada, and it brings together Char, Yuji Toriyama, and Hisashi (from the rock band Glay), who Utada describes as "hard-edged guitarists with a manly spirit." "Play Ball" is sung smoothly, comparing the emotions that oscillate between boldness and delicacy to playing baseball. It also features a slightly backward rhythm that emphasizes the third and fourth beats.

"Tokyo Nights" depicts a wanderer in search of a place where he can quench his thirst in the bustling nightless city of Tokyo, with arpeggios of oboe and harpsichord that seem to herald the arrival of night. "A.S.A.P." contains the sampling of bells that continues from the intro and the beat, which is hastened by heavy, thick strings, creating a suspicious cloudiness. "Uso Mitai na I Love You" is a hard rock number with the same melody used in part in "Simple & Clean," the English adaptation of the song "Hikari."

"Final Distance" is the song that inspired the creation of the album Deep River; Utada stated that the meaning of the word "final" for the song "Final Distance" is "most important" rather than "last." "Bridge - Interlude" is a string-driven, one-minute instrumental. "Hikari," which Utada named after themselves as the title, features a deep acoustic guitar sound and a sparkling melody that differ from the style of their previous songs. Utada said that when they wrote the lyrics for this song that they dared to use styles and phrases that are not usually used in lyrics, and that they also used the first person, "boku" and "watashi," which they had not used before, to give character to the main character of the lyrics.

== Title and artwork ==
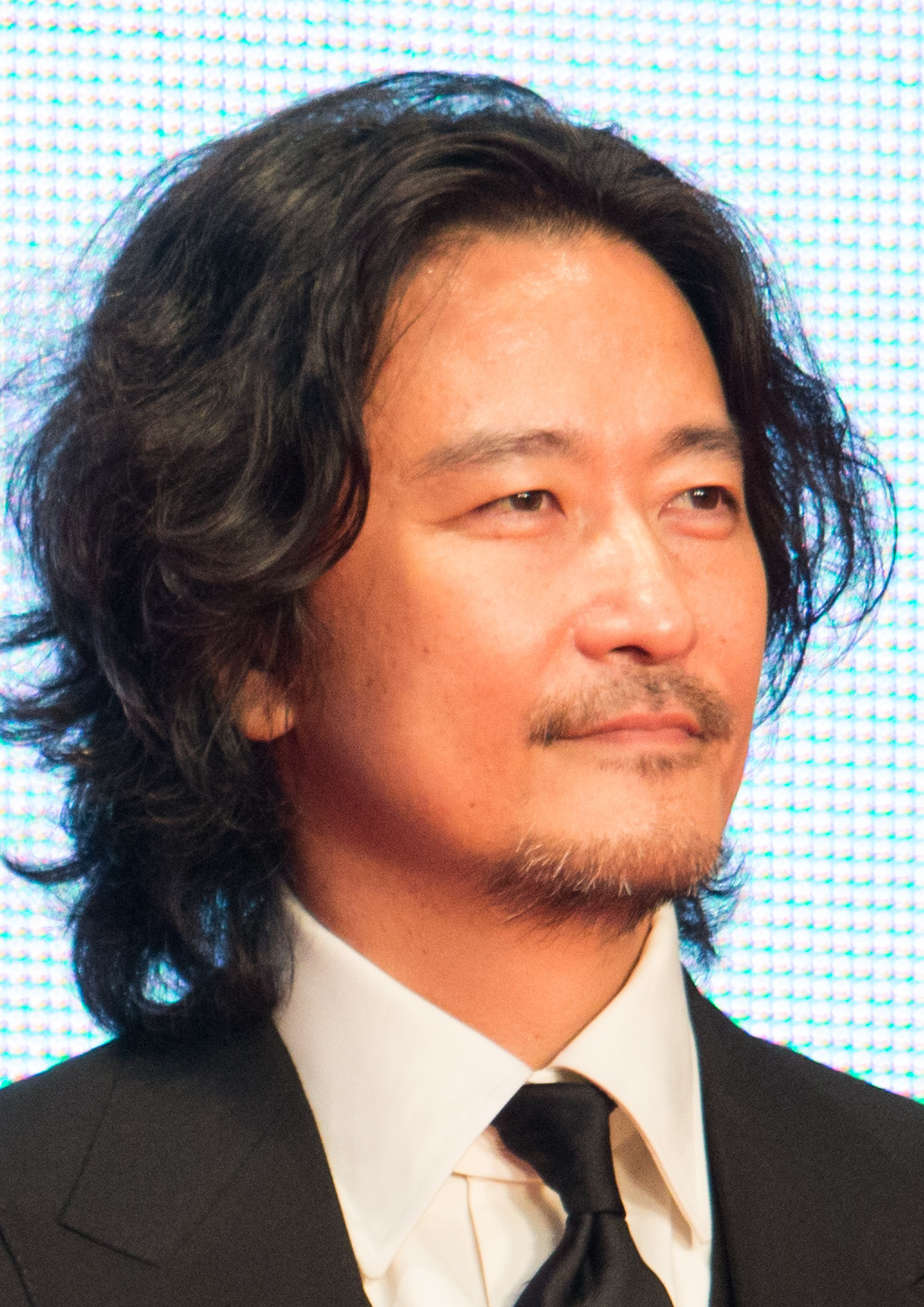
The visuals for Deep River were created by Kiriya Kazuaki.

The title of the album, as well as the song "Deep River," was inspired by the novel Deep River by Shusaku Endo. In May 2000, Utada revealed on their official website that they liked Endo's The Sea and Poison and that they were in the process of reading Deep River again. The artwork for the album jacket and booklet was done by Kazuaki Kiriya, who also worked on the visuals of Utada's previous album Distance. The entire album's artwork is grayscale, and the booklet is infamous for including a photo of Utada's foot.

In June 2002, a large exhibition of Utada's photographs taken by Daido Moriyama was held. The photographs were taken in the streets of Shinjuku. All of the photographs were in black and white and show Utada standing alone in a deserted urban alleyway. Utada and Moriyama have never seen each other since then, and Moriyama recalled their encounter as a "holy once-in-a-lifetime" experience in a 2018 magazine interview. Moriyama said that his impression of Utada at the time was that they were "a very smart girl, very honest and of good character," and that he had photographed Utada's mother, Keiko Fuji, once before, which was one of the reasons he agreed to do the shoot. He also said that it was cute when Utada told him during the shoot, "Please take beautiful pictures of me, like my mother." Moriyama added, "When I moved closer to get a close-up of Utada, she really looked like Keiko Fuji in the viewfinder. When I took the camera off, I saw Hikaru Utada, who still looked like a little girl. It was a strange feeling. I remember that feeling."

== Promotion ==
=== Singles and other songs ===
On July 25, 2001, Toshiba EMI released the album's lead single, "Final Distance." The physical version of the single contained both the original recording "Distance" and various remixes of the songs. The song received positive reviews from critics and peaked at number two on the Oricon Singles Chart. After shipping over 400,000 units, the Recording Industry Association of Japan (RIAJ) certified it platinum. The album's second single, "Traveling," was released on November 28, 2001, along with an additional DVD that included the music video and behind-the-scenes footage. Critics praised the song's danceable sound and production style. It became the album's first chart-topper on the Oricon Singles Chart, and it was certified million by the RIAJ after shipping more than one million copies nationwide.

On March 20, 2002, "Hikari" was released as the album's third single. The song served as the theme song for Square's action role-playing video game Kingdom Hearts (2002), as well as its English version "Simple & Clean" in international markets. It received positive reviews from critics and debuted at the top of the Oricon Singles Chart. The single was certified double platinum by the RIAJ after selling over 500,000 copies in Japan. "Sakura Drops" and "Letters" were released as a double A-side single on May 9, 2002. Both songs received positive feedback and debuted at the top of the Oricon Singles Chart, earning the album's final double platinum certification from the RIAJ. The RIAJ certified "Sakura Drops" gold for exceeding 100,000 digital downloads. The song "Play Ball" was released as a radio single prior to the release of the album for promotion.

To promote the album, the video collection Utada Hikaru Single Clip Collection Vol. 3 was released on home video, which included all of the music videos from the Deep River era as well as behind-the-scenes footage for each one. Toshiba EMI distributed it throughout Japan on September 30, 2002.

== Release and reception ==
Professional ratings
Review scores
Source	Rating
CDJournal	(positive)
MTVChinese.com	5/5 stars
Akadot	9/10 stars
Sputnikmusic	4.5/5 stars

Toshiba EMI released Deep River on June 19, 2002. In Japan, it was initially available on CD, picture disc, and double vinyl, each with twelve tracks. EMI Music went on to release the album in several Asian countries, including China, Indonesia, Malaysia, the Philippines, South Korea, Taiwan, and Thailand. Deep River was re-released worldwide on January 23, 2019, through digital and streaming services, with a double vinyl edition re-issued in Japan by Universal Music Japan on March 10, 2022.

Afternoon Black Tea from MTVChinese.com awarded the album a perfect score of five out of five stars, stating in the review: "The album is rich in style and rhythm, and before the release of the album, Utada said to the public that 'this is their best work', which is true, and this is indeed their most amazing work since their debut." The Japanese music publication CDJournal gave the album a good review. They praised the album's sound and overall arrangement quality, while also mentioning Utada's "sincere" songwriting and storytelling.

Isaac Lew from Akadot awarded the album nine stars out of ten; he described the album as a “journey through Utada’s Deep River of life”, with tracks like "Sakura Drops" singled out for their hooks and emotional impact. A retrospective review from Sputnikmusic member WashboardSuds gave the album a 4.5/5 “superb” rating, highlighting Utada's unique voice and ability to stand out in a crowded J-pop scene.

From 2002 to 2003, the album and several singles received numerous awards. At the 2002 Japan Gold Disc Awards, Deep River won Rock & Pop Album of the Year, "Travelling" won Music Video of the Year, and "Travelling," "Hikari," and "Sakura Drops" won Songs of the Year. The Japanese Society for Rights of Authors, Composers and Publishers (JASRAC Awards) honoured the album's single "Hikari" with the Foreign Silver Award, while "Travelling" received the Silver Award. In 2002, Utada, the album, and "Travelling" were nominated for Best Female Artist, Album of the Year, and Video of the Year at the MTV Video Music Awards Japan. A year later, "Sakura Drops" was named the Best Female Video. The Television Drama Academy Awards went on to accolade "Sakura Drops" with the best Drama Song Award.

== Commercial performance ==
Deep River achieved great commercial success nationwide. It debuted at number one on the Oricon Albums Chart with 2,350,170 copies sold in its first week, making it the country's fifth-fastest-selling album. It stayed at number one for a second consecutive week with 550,250 copies sold. Overall, Deep River charted for a total of 57 weeks. Deep River was the best-selling album in Japan of 2002, having sold 3,526,780 units by the end of the year. The Recording Industry Association of Japan (RIAJ) certified the album triple million for selling more than three million copies, with Oricon claiming sales of over 3.604 million in Japan. The International Federation of the Phonographic Industry (IFPI) named Deep River the 18th best-selling record in 2002, and it is currently the eighth best-selling album in Japan, and is Utada's third best-selling studio album after Distance and First Love.

== Track listing ==
All tracks are written by Hikaru Utada.

No.	Title	Length
1.	"Sakura Drops (SAKURAドロップス, Sakura Doroppusu)"	4:58
2.	"Traveling"	5:14
3.	"Shiawase ni Narō (幸せになろう; Let's Be Happy)"	4:46
4.	"Deep River"	4:37
5.	"Letters"	4:48
6.	"Play Ball (プレイ・ボール, Purei Bōru)"	4:14
7.	"Tokyo Nights (東京NIGHTS)"	4:43
8.	"A.S.A.P."	4:56
9.	"Uso Mitai na I Love You (嘘みたいな I Love You; The Dubious I Love You)"	4:49
10.	"Final Distance"	5:38
11.	"Bridge (Interlude)"	1:09
12.	"Hikari (光; Light)"	5:02
Total length:		54:54

No.	Title	Length
13.	"Simple & Clean" (2018 remastered bonus track)	5:02
Total length:		59:56

== Personnel ==
Personnel details were sourced from the Deep River liner notes booklet.

Musicians

- Hikaru Utada – lead vocals, backing vocals, arrangement (all tracks)
- Kawano Kei – arrangement (track 1), additional arrangement (track 8), keyboards, cembalo (track 7), guitar sample (track 2), drums (track 9)
- Saito Neko – string arrangement (track 10), violin (track 11)
- Akira Hironori – acoustic guitar (tracks 4–5, 12), electric guitar (tracks 1–6), electric sitar (track 4)
- Honda Larry Yuchiro – arrangement, string arrangement, keyboards (track 8), acoustic guitar (track 5), electric guitar, electric bass (track 9), guitar sample (track 1)
- Kon Tsuyoshi – acoustic guitar (track 4)
- Char – acoustic guitar (track 5)
- Toriyama Yuji – acoustic guitar (track 5)
- HISASHI – acoustic guitar (track 5)
- Utada Sking Teruzane – acoustic guitar (track 5)
- Kanzo – guitar sample (track 1)
- Saito Mitsutaka – electric bass (track 2)
- Great Eida Strings – strings (tracks 7, 10)
- Abe Masahi Cello Octet – strings (track 8)
- Ishibashi Masakazu – oboe (track 7)

Technical and production

- Hikaru Utada – songwriting (all tracks), executive production, programing
- Utada Sking Teruzane – executive production
- Miyake Akira – executive production
- Tad Jensen – mastering
- Ugajin Masaaki – recording
- Matsui Atsushi – recording
- Goh Hotoda – recording, mixing
- Kawano Kei – programming (all tracks)
- Honda Larry Yuchiro – programming (track 8)
- Tsunemi Kazuhide – synthesizer programming (all tracks)

Visuals

- Kiriya Kazuaki – art direction, photography
- Cho Kenji – art direction, design
- Mayama Yuki – styling
- Inagaki Ryoji – hair, make-up

== Charts ==
=== Weekly chart ===
Chart (2002)	Peak position
Japanese Albums (Oricon)	1
Singaporean Albums (RIAS)	3

=== Monthly charts ===
Chart (2002)	Peak position
Japanese Albums (Oricon)	1

=== Yearly chart ===
Chart (2002)	Position
Japanese Albums (Oricon)	1
Worldwide Albums (IFPI)	18

=== Decade-end charts ===
Chart (2000–2009)	Position
Japanese Albums (Oricon)	3

=== All-time chart ===
Chart	Position
Japanese Albums (Oricon)	8

== Certification and sales ==
Region	Certification	Certified units/sales
Japan (RIAJ)	3× Million	3,604,588
Taiwan	—	150,000

== Release history ==
Region	Date	Format(s)	Label	Ref.
Japan	June 19, 2002	CD; picture disc; vinyl	Toshiba EMI	
China	2002	CD	Toshiba EMI	
Indonesia	2002	CD	Toshiba EMI	
Philippines	2002	CD	Toshiba EMI	
South Korea	2002	CD	Toshiba EMI	
Taiwan	2002	CD	Toshiba EMI	
Thailand	2002	CD	Toshiba EMI	
Various	January 23, 2019	Digital download	EMI Music	
Japan	March 10, 2022	Vinyl	Universal Music Japan	

== See also ==
- List of fastest-selling albums
- List of best-selling albums in Japan
- List of Oricon number-one albums of 2002
