= Time limit (disambiguation) =

A time limit is a narrow field of time by which an objective or task must be accomplished.

Time limit may also refer to:

- Time Limit (film), a 1957 drama film
- "Time Limit" (song), a 2000 R&B single by Hikaru Utada

== See also ==
- Bandlimiting
