= Utada United 2006 =

2006 concert tour by Hikaru Utada

- Tour by Hikaru Utada
- Associated album: Ultra Blue
- Start date: July 1, 2006
- End date: September 10, 2006
- No. of shows: 22

Hikaru Utada concert chronology
- Utada Hikaru in Budokan 2004 (2004); Utada United 2006 (2006); Utada: In the Flesh 2010 (2010)

Utada United 2006 was a Japanese concert tour by Japanese-American singer-songwriter Hikaru Utada. It was Utada's second concert tour of Japan following their Bohemian Summer 2000 tour. A live DVD of the tour was released on December 20, 2006.

== Overview ==
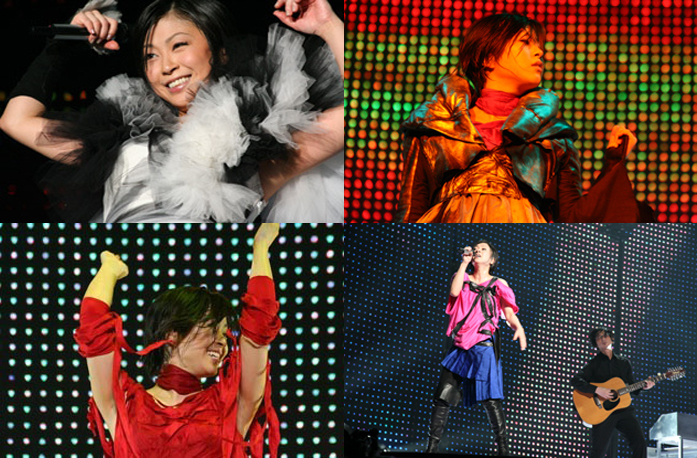
The four outfits worn on the tour

During the filmed concert, Utada wore four different outfits. The first outfit worn was a long, tattered, black and white outfit with pieces of cloth that hung a little above their ankles. Near the shoulders, this dress seemed to puff out, or become feather-like. They sang their first seven songs in this outfit. Then they wore a leather-like coat, that resembled a ballroom gown from the waist down. Utada sang their Exodus songs in this dress. When looked at closely, you can see that underneath it was the next outfit, which was a red dress. It had strips near the shoulders, and allowed them to move more; a feature which was helpful in performances like "Can You Keep a Secret?" and "Wait & See ~Risk~". They sang the next eight songs in this particular outfit. The last outfit, which was very light compared to the rest, had a small blue skirt and a light pink top. In this outfit, they sang their last two songs, "Automatic" and "Hikari".

In some of early performances, they substituted the pink top with a black blouse. Underneath all of the outfits was a black sleeve-less leotard and black knee high boots with wedge heels.

The concerts at the Saitama Super Arena attracted about 18,000 spectators each.

== Set list ==
Main set

1. Opening (Exodus opening track)
2. Passion
3. This Is Love
4. Traveling
5. Movin' On Without You
6. Sakura Drops
7. Final Distance
8. First Love
9. Untitled (Video interlude)
10. Devil Inside
11. Kremlin Dusk
12. You Make Me Want to Be a Man
13. Be My Last
14. Dareka no Negai ga Kanau Koro
15. Colors
16. Can You Keep a Secret?
17. Addicted to You
18. Wait & See (Risk)
19. Letters
20. Keep Tryin'
21. Automatic
22. Hikari

== Tour dates ==
List of concerts
Date	City	Country	Venue
July 1, 2006	Sendai	Japan	Sekisui Heim Super Arena
July 2, 2006	Sendai	Japan	Sekisui Heim Super Arena
July 8, 2006	Shizuoka	Japan	Ecopa Arena
July 9, 2006	Shizuoka	Japan	Ecopa Arena
July 15, 2006	Fukuoka	Japan	Marine Messe Fukuoka
July 16, 2006	Fukuoka	Japan	Marine Messe Fukuoka
July 25, 2006	Osaka	Japan	Osaka-jō Hall
July 26, 2006	Osaka	Japan	Osaka-jō Hall
August 4, 2006	Niigata	Japan	Toki Messe
August 5, 2006	Niigata	Japan	Toki Messe
August 8, 2006	Nagoya	Japan	Nippon Gaishi Hall
August 9, 2006	Nagoya	Japan	Nippon Gaishi Hall
August 17, 2006	Saitama	Japan	Saitama Super Arena
August 18, 2006	Saitama	Japan	Saitama Super Arena
August 24, 2006	Sapporo	Japan	Makomanai Ice Arena
August 25, 2006	Sapporo	Japan	Makomanai Ice Arena
August 29, 2006	Ehime	Japan	Ehime Prefecture Budokan
August 29, 2006	Ehime	Japan	Ehime Prefecture Budokan
September 2, 2006	Hiroshima	Japan	Hiroshima Prefectural Sports Center
September 3, 2006	Hiroshima	Japan	Hiroshima Prefectural Sports Center
September 9, 2006	Tokyo	Japan	Yoyogi National Gymnasium
September 10, 2006	Tokyo	Japan	Yoyogi National Gymnasium
