= Kazuaki Kiriya =

Japanese filmmaker

Kazuaki Kiriya (紀里谷 和明)
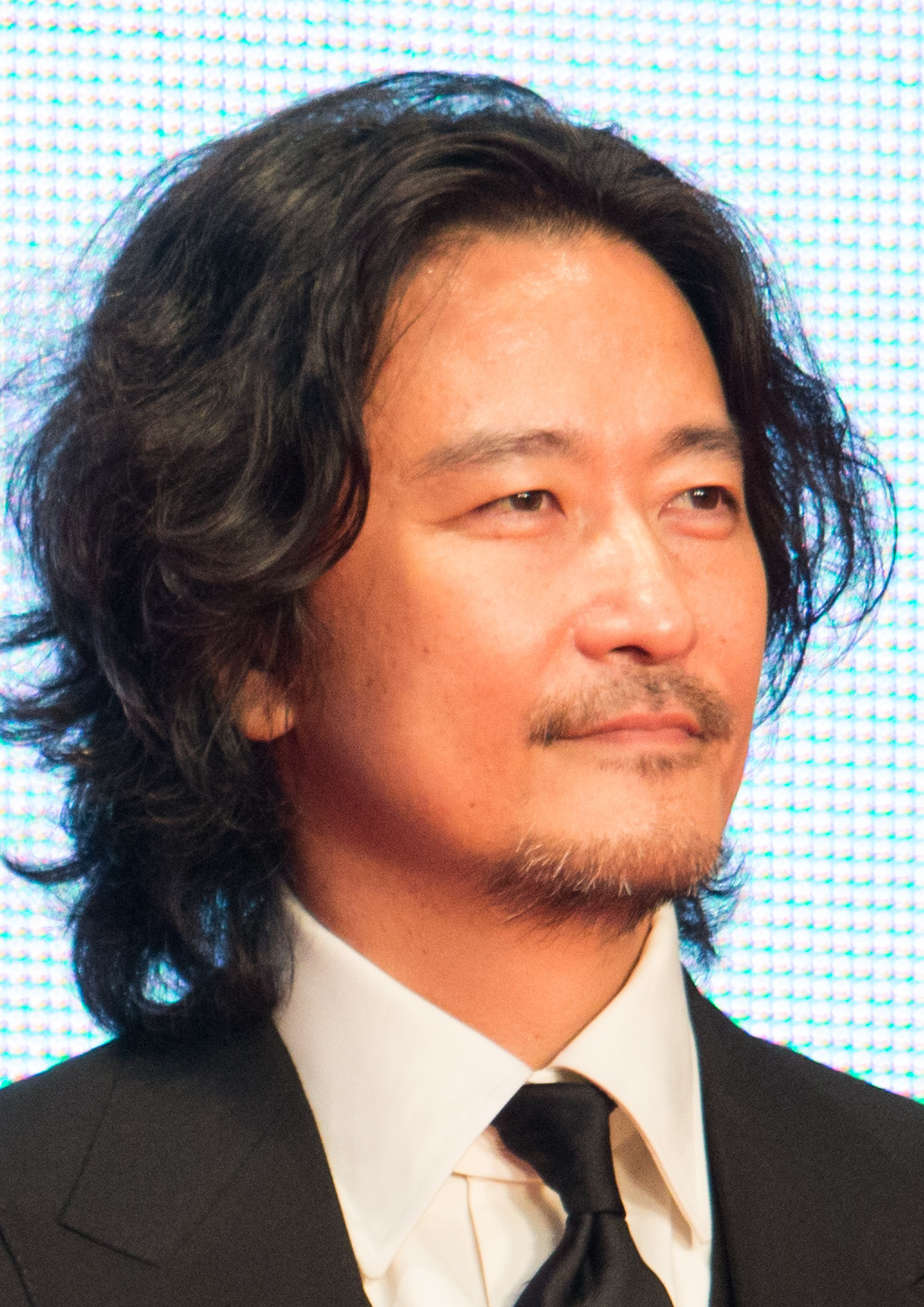
- Born: Kazuhiro Iwashita (岩下 和裕); April 20, 1968 (age 58); Asagiri, Kumamoto, Japan
- Occupations: Film director, music video director, photographer
- Spouse: Hikaru Utada (m. 2002; div. 2007)

Kazuaki Kiriya (紀里谷 和明, Kiriya Kazuaki; born April 20, 1968) is a Japanese photographer and director of films and music videos. His birth name is Kazuhiro Iwashita (岩下 和裕, Iwashita Kazuhiro). He is represented by Paradigm Agency.

== Early life and career ==
In 1983, in his second year of junior high school, he moved to the United States. He attended Northfield Mount Hermon School and the Cambridge School in Weston, Massachusetts and then the School of Constructed Environments at Parsons The New School for Design in New York. At first, as a student, he aimed to enter the business world, but through the experience of seeing others' pleasure when he communicated through drawing at times when his English failed him, he came to be more oriented toward the world of art. Beginning in 1994, he became involved in designing album covers, photography, and directing music videos for many recording artists including Hikaru Utada, SMAP, The Back Horn, Mr. Children, Misia, Southern All Stars, Glay, and Ayumi Hamasaki.

Kiriya made his feature film debut in 2004, writing and directing the ambitious live action film adaptation of Casshan. The film was among the first to be shot on a digital backlot. In 2009, he wrote and directed his second film, Goemon (a fantasy epic based on the life of Ishikawa Goemon), in which he also appeared in a cameo as Akechi Mitsuhide. In 2015, Kiriya directed his first English-language film, Last Knights, a reimagining of the legend of the forty-seven ronin.

== Personal life ==
Kiriya is a vegetarian. He was wed to Japanese-American pop artist Hikaru Utada from September 6, 2002, until they divorced on March 2, 2007.

== Filmography ==
=== Films ===
Year	Title	Director	Writer	Producer	DoP	Editor	Actor
2004	Casshern	Yes	Yes	No	Yes	Yes	No
2009	Goemon	Yes	Yes	Yes	Yes	Yes	Yes
2015	Last Knights	Yes	No	Yes	No	No	No
2023	From the End of the World	Yes	Yes	No	No	No	No

=== Music videos ===
Year	Artist	Song
2000	The Back Horn	"Fūsen" (風船; "Balloon")
2001	The Back Horn	"Sora, Hoshi, Umi no Yoru" (空、星、海の夜; "Night of Sky, Stars and Sea")
2001	The Back Horn	"Hitorigoto" (ひとり言; "Soliloquy")
2001	Shunsuke Nakamura	"Yuki ga Tokeru Mae ni..." (雪がとける前に･･･; "Before the Snow Melts...")
2001	Hikaru Utada	"Final Distance"
2001	Hikaru Utada	"Traveling"
2002	Hikaru Utada	"Hikari"
2002	Hikaru Utada	"Sakura Drops"
2002	Hikaru Utada	"Deep River"
2004	Hikaru Utada	"Dareka no Negai ga Kanau Koro"
2005	Hikaru Utada	"You Make Me Want to Be a Man"
2005	Hikaru Utada	"Be My Last"
2005	Hikaru Utada	"Passion"
2006	Hikaru Utada	"Keep Tryin'"
2006	Glay	"Koi" (恋; "Love")

== Sources ==
- Goemon movie official website
- 紀里谷和明 (Kazuaki Kiriya) at IMDb
- 紀里谷和明 (Kazuaki Kiriya) at the Japanese Movie Database (in Japanese)
