= For You (Hikaru Utada song) =

2000 single by Hikaru Utada

Single by Hikaru Utada

from the album Distance
- A-side: "Time Limit"
- Released: June 30, 2000
- Genre: Pop; R&B
- Length: 5:22
- Label: Toshiba EMI
- Songwriter: Hikaru Utada
- Producers: Kei Kawano; Akira Miyake; Teruzane Utada

Hikaru Utada singles chronology
"Wait & See (Risk)" (2000)	"For You" / "Time Limit" (2000)	"Can You Keep a Secret?" (2001)

Music video
- "For You" on YouTube

"For You" is a song written and recorded by Japanese-American musician Hikaru Utada for their third studio album Distance (2001). It was released as a double A-side single with the song "Time Limit" on June 30, 2000.

== Background and development ==
In 1999, Utada released their debut album First Love, which became the most commercially successful album of all time in Japan. After this success, they released two follow-up singles, "Addicted to You" (1999) and "Wait & See (Risk)" (2000), which were both produced by American production team Jimmy Jam and Terry Lewis. "For You" was a continuation of Utada's collaboration with arranger Kei Kawano, who had previously worked with Utada on First Love (including the single "First Love") and the coupling tracks on the single "Wait & See (Risk)". The song was recorded at Toshiba EMI's Studio Terra in Tokyo.

The "For You" / "Time Limit" single was released right before Bohemian Summer 2000, Utada's first wide-scale tour of Japan, and on the same day as the DVD single release of their previous single, "Wait & See (Risk)".

== Promotion and release ==
A music video was created for the song, featuring footage from their secret live performance at the Shibuya On Air East on June 26, 2000, just before the start of the Bohemian Summer 2000 tour.

The song was first unveiled on June 19, 2000, when a 60-second preview of "For You" was previewed on Japan FM Network radio stations, a week after "Time Limit" was previewed. To promote the single, Utada appeared in magazines released in June and July, such as Pati Pati, What's In?, Pia, Tokyo Walker and Popteen. On June 23, 2000, Utada performed the song live at Music Station, and on the June 29 episode of Utaban performed both "For You" and "Time Limit".

== Critical reception ==
Sato of OngakuDB.com felt that "For You" explored solitude similar to Osamu Dazai's 1948 novel No Longer Human, however expressed this in the "direct words of a 17 year old" instead of "spitting out the words of an adult". CDJournal reviewers felt that the song "[did not] have an instantly gripping sound and doesn't feel like something flat out, but her Japanese-style taste moves the bottom line with her heavy kicks and expert harmonies." The reviewers further remarked that the song had Utada's signature vocal sound and a high level of perfection.

The "For You" / "Time Limit" single was successful enough to win a Song of the Year award at the 15th Japan Gold Disc Awards.

== Covers ==
In 2014, Japanese singer Miliyah Kato recorded a cover of "For You" for Utada Hikaru no Uta, a tribute album celebrating 15 years since Utada's debut. The cover sampled the original recording of the song by Utada, and also incorporated "Give Me a Reason" from Utada's debut album First Love.

== Track listing ==
"For You" / "Time Limit" single
No.	Title	Writer(s)	Producer(s)	Length
1.	"For You"	Hikaru Utada	Kei Kawano	5:22
2.	"Time Limit"	Utada, Takuro Kubo	Rodney Jerkins, Utada	4:55
3.	"For You" (Original Karaoke)	Utada	Kawano	5:22
4.	"Time Limit" (Original Karaoke)	Utada, Kubo	Jerkins, Utada	4:55
Total length:				20:34

== Personnel ==
Personnel details were sourced from "For You/Time Limit"'s liner notes booklet.

- Goh Hotoda – mixing
- Takahiro Iida – synthesizer programming
- Kei Kawano – arrangement, all keyboards, electric guitar, programming
- Akira Miyake – production
- Hidenobu Okita – talking modulator
- Masaaki Ugajin – recording, tape scratch
- Hikaru Utada – all vocals, writing
- Teruzane "Sking" Utada – production

== Charts ==
Chart (2000)	Peak position
Japan Oricon weekly singles: "For You/Time Limit"	1

== Sales and certifications ==
Chart	Amount
Oricon physical sales: "For You/Time Limit"	889,000
RIAJ physical certification: "For You/Time Limit"	3× Platinum (1,200,000)

== Release history ==
Region	Date	Format	Distributing label	Catalog code
Japan	June 30, 2000	CD single	Toshiba EMI	TOCT-4230
Japan	April 1, 2004	Digital download	Toshiba EMI	
South Korea	September 30, 2005	Digital download	Universal Music Korea	
