= Time Limit (song) =

Single by Hikaru Utada

from the album Distance
- A-side: "For You"
- Released: June 30, 2000
- Genre: Pop; R&B
- Length: 4:55
- Label: Toshiba EMI
- Songwriters: Hikaru Utada; Takuro Kubo
- Producer: Rodney Jerkins

Hikaru Utada singles chronology
"Wait & See (Risk)" (2000)	"For You" / "Time Limit" (2000)	"Can You Keep a Secret?" (2001)

Music video
- "Time Limit" on YouTube

"Time Limit" (Japanese: タイム・リミット, Hepburn: Taimu Rimitto) is a song recorded by Japanese-American musician Hikaru Utada for their third studio album Distance (2001). It was released as a double A-side single with the song "For You" on June 30, 2000.

== Background and development ==
In Spring 1999, Utada released their debut album First Love, which became the most commercially successful album of all time in Japan. After this success, they released two follow-up singles, "Addicted to You" (1999) and "Wait & See (Risk)" (2000), which were both produced by American production team Jimmy Jam and Terry Lewis. For "Time Limit", Utada enlisted the help of American producer Rodney Jerkins, and recorded the song at Darkchild Studios in New Jersey.

The song was co-composed with Takuro of the band Glay, the first time Utada had shared the role of songwriter since their 1998 pre-debut album Precious as Cubic U. For Utada's second album Distance (2001), they worked together with Takuro again on the song "Drama".

The "For You" / "Time Limit" single was released right before Bohemian Summer 2000, their first wide-scale tour of Japan, and on the same day as the DVD single release of their previous single, "Wait & See (Risk)".

== Promotion and release ==
The song was first unveiled on June 12, 2000, when a 60-second preview of "Time Limit" was previewed on Japan FM Network radio stations, a week before "For You" was previewed. To promote the single, Utada appeared in magazines released in June and July, such as Pati Pati, What's In?, Pia, Tokyo Walker and Popteen.

Utada performed "Time Limit" live on Hey! Hey! Hey! Music Champ on June 26, 2000. This show was one of the highest-rated episodes of the program, taking in a 22.1% share of viewers for the time slot, however was beaten by Utada's previous appearances on the show in 1999 and later in 2001. On the June 29 episode of Utaban, Utada performed both "For You" and "Time Limit".

== Music video ==
A music video was created for the song, featuring footage of a live performance by Utada on their Bohemian Summer 2000 tour. The footage was taken from the July 1, 2000 concert at the Yoyogi National Gymnasium, Tokyo.

== Critical reception ==
Sato of OngakuDB.com noted the song's layered chorus work, and felt that to fully appreciate this, the song was better suited to listening at home on CD, rather than hearing it on television. CDJournal reviewers felt that Utada's "tightly structured" vocals made it into a "superior pop" song.

The "For You" / "Time Limit" single was successful enough to win a Song of the Year award at the 15th Japan Gold Disc Awards.

== Track listings ==
"For You" / "Time Limit" single
No.	Title	Writer(s)	Arranger	Length
1.	"For You"	Hikaru Utada	Kei Kawano	5:22
2.	"Time Limit"	Utada, Takuro Kubo	Rodney Jerkins, Utada	4:55
3.	"For You" (Original Karaoke)	Utada	Kawano	5:22
4.	"Time Limit" (Original Karaoke)	Utada, Kubo	Jerkins, Utada	4:55
Total length:				20:34

Time Limit promo vinyl record
No.	Title	Length
1.	"Time Limit"	4:55
2.	"Time Limit" (instrumental)	4:55
3.	"Time Limit" (a cappella)	4:55
Total length:		14:45

== Personnel ==
Personnel details were sourced from "For You/Time Limit"'s liner notes booklet.

- Paul Foley – Pro-Tools editing
- Rodney Jerkins – arrangement, production, rap, recording
- Takuro Kubo – writing
- Harvey Mason, Jr. – pro-tools editing, recording
- Dexter Simmons – mixing
- Hikaru Utada – all vocals, arrangement, writing

== Charts ==
Chart (2000)	Peak position
Japan Oricon weekly singles: "For You/Time Limit"	1

== Sales and certifications ==
Chart	Amount
Oricon physical sales: "For You/Time Limit"	889,000
RIAJ physical certification: "For You/Time Limit"	3× Platinum (1,200,000)

== Release history ==
Region	Date	Format	Distributing label	Catalogue codes
Japan	June 30, 2000	CD single	Toshiba EMI	TOCT-4230
Japan	April 1, 2004	Digital download	Toshiba EMI	
South Korea	September 30, 2005	Digital download	Universal Music Korea	
