= Distance (Hikaru Utada album) =

Studio album by Hikaru Utada
- Released: March 28, 2001
- Recorded: 1999–2001
- Studios: Flyte Tyme Studios (Edina); Studio Terra (Tokyo); The Hit Factory (New York City); Toshiba EMI Studio (Tokyo); Bunkamura Studios (Tokyo); Studio Groove (Osaka); Darkchild Studios (Pleasantville)
- Genres: J-pop; R&B; alt-rock; techno
- Length: 64:26
- Labels: Eastworld; Toshiba-EMI
- Producers: Hikaru Utada; Darkchild; Jimmy Jam and Terry Lewis; Akira Miyake; Teruzane Utada

Hikaru Utada chronology
First Love (1999)	Distance (2001)	Deep River (2002)

Singles from Distance
- 1. "Addicted to You" Released: November 10, 1999; 2. "Wait & See (Risk)" Released: April 19, 2000; 3. "For You / Time Limit" Released: June 30, 2000; 4. "Can You Keep a Secret?" Released: February 16, 2001

Distance is the third studio album by Japanese-American singer Hikaru Utada. Toshiba EMI released it on March 28, 2001, making it their second release with the label. Utada wrote and co-produced the majority of the album, alongside previous collaborators Akira Miyake and Teruzane Utada, as well as new collaborations with American producers Rodney Jerkins and Jimmy Jam & Terry Lewis. Distance, like its predecessor First Love (1999), is influenced by pop music and R&B, with additional hip-hop, rock, reggae, and techno influences from Western music.

Music critics praised the overall sound and production quality of Distance, earning Utada numerous awards and recognitions as a result of its critical success. Distance was released on the same day as Ayumi Hamasaki's greatest hits album A Best (2001), a coincidence which Avex Trax had organised. This resulted in extensive coverage in both Japanese and Western music media. Despite its marketing and competition, Distance was a huge commercial success. It ascended to number one on the Oricon Albums Chart with the highest-ever first-week sales in music history until Adele's 25 14 years later, and eventually became the fourth best-selling album of all time in Japan.

To promote the album, Utada released four singles: "Addicted to You," "Wait & See (Risk)," "For You / Time Limit" and "Can You Keep a Secret?." All four releases were successful in the Japanese market, selling over a million copies and becoming best-sellers. They promoted the album by performing two shows in Japan: Bohemian Summer 2000 and a special Unplugged event, both of which resulted in live releases. Furthermore, a video collection titled Utada Hikaru Single Clip Collection Vol. 2 was released, which included all of the album's music videos.

== Background and recording ==
First Love, Utada's major-label debut studio album, was released in March 1999 via Toshiba EMI. First Love, which they co-wrote and produced with Teruzane Utada and Akira Miyake, was a commercial success throughout the year, becoming the best-selling album in Japanese music history. With a string of successful singles, Utada quickly rose to prominence in Japan, where they were ranked fifth on the Tokyo Hot 100's Top 100 Artists of the 20th Century, as voted on by stations and listeners. During the summer of 1999, their final summer vacation as a high school student, they performed a video concert called Luv Live Remix: Hello From New York, a charity concert called Soukenbicha Natural Breeze Concert '99 with TLC and Monica, made their first TV commercial appearance, and recorded a new song that was called “Addicted To You.”

Distance contains songs recorded between 1999 and 2001. During their last summer vacation as a high school student in 1999, Utada flew to Minneapolis and produced "Addicted To You" with Jimmy Jam & Terry Lewis, the production team that has worked with artists such as TLC and Janet Jackson. In both the United States and Japan, the producer's influence is often more prominent than that of the artist, but in Minneapolis, Utada said that the production with them was on an equal footing, and that it was a "ball of ideas." The follow-up, “Wait & See (Risk),” was also produced by Jimmy Jam & Terry Lewis, but this time Utada was unable to make it to Minneapolis due to schoolwork; however, Utada even made an arrangement track for the song in the demo tape stage, which was retained in the actual arrangement, and Utada's name was added to the arranger's credits for the first time. Before their first national tour in 2000, they produced “Time Limit” with top producer Rodney Jerkins, one of the R&B scene's leading producers at the time. "For You,” for which the melody was created before their debut, was also completed around this time. In addition, several of the recorded songs were created during the same tour. Utada said that live performances are not R&B but rock, and those songs were also arranged with a rock flavor. The rest of the album's songs were written and recorded in November of the same year, after their university exams were over, and were recorded over the New Years when their university was on winter vacation. When asked why they were not appearing on Kōhaku Uta Gassen at the time, Utada replied: "Because I want to make an album."

On January 26, 2001, Utada announced on their official website that recording for the album Distance had been completed. Akira Miyake, who has been Utada's producer since their debut, wrote a "Post-Recording Notes" on Utada's official website on February 2, 2001, saying:

We wrote the songs, wrote the lyrics, made demos, made arrangement demos, and then redid them over and over again, through trial and error, singing in the studio, and doing the chorus dozens of times (in some places it's layered about 40 times. It wasn't done by machine). I honestly thought it would be hard because Hikaru was doing it herself, but it was a year and eight months of coldly working and giving deadlines. But Hikaru always struggled, but she always lived up to our expectations by demonstrating her magician-like nature."

== Composition ==
Musically, Distance expands on their previous studio album's R&B-influenced sound while also incorporating jazz, pop music, hip-hop, and rock elements. According to Ian Martin, writing for AllMusic, the tracks produced by Jerkins, Jam, and Lewis had a "rich production" as opposed to the "cheap, tinny" sound of Japanese pop at the time. "Wait & See (Risk)" is a genuine US-style R&B number with a sprinkling of funk and soul flavors. "Can You Keep a Secret?" was billed as a J-pop song with "sophisticated" songwriting and production standards. The album's title track is a pop song that features twinkling beats, topped with a 90s-like piano melody and filled with breathy background vocals. "Sunglasses" is a medium-slow number that features an ensemble that intersects with a falsetto. "Drama" is a song that was written in collaboration with Takuro from Glay; it features brazenly strummed distortion guitars.

"Eternally" is a power ballad that sings about "love" and "eternity" head-on. "Addicted to You" is an authentic R&B produced song that incorporates the "chiki-chiki" sound throughout. "For You" is an R&B pop ballad. "Kettobase!" is a high-speed pop rock song with a punchy guitar rock sound that combines hard and sharp elements. "Parody" is a reggae-style song with phrases reminiscent of Sting's "Englishman in New York." "Time Limit" is medium tempo R&B track. "Kotoba ni Naranai Kimochi" is an R&B number with a funky bass line.

== Concept ==
The album title was chosen because it was something Utada felt when interacting with others . Utada said they realized that their songs were about various types of " distance," such as "relationships between people, ways of interacting, ways of relating, and emotional distance." They also said that the word "distance" was a perfect fit, given that they had visited and been involved in the production of the album in a variety of places, from Tokyo to Osaka, Atlantic City, Minneapolis, New York, Miami, London, and Hong Kong. Utada also said the following about the title in an interview :

Distance. Distance and time are very similar... or rather, isn't distance a unit that is closely related to time? And in a sense it includes time, so I really feel that distance is something that exists in a world that exists within time... So, when I think about each song on this album, I feel that the lyrics are the result of thinking about things like time or distance. So, I think that these past two years have been two years in which I've thought about all kinds of distances and time.

Utada says that the title track "Distance" brings together and connects all the themes of the lyrics of the other songs on the album. Utada believes that no matter how close you are to someone, even if they are your parents or lovers, no matter how much you understand each other, no matter how much you trust each other and how close you get to each other, "in the end, you can't become one," "distance will always be created," and that "it's something that can't be helped." In "Distance," Utada said they wanted to portray the idea that "you really need to acknowledge that distance and cherish it."

== Promotion ==
On November 10, 1999, Toshiba EMI released the album's lead single, "Addicted to You". Two versions of the song were on the single: the "Up-In-Heaven Mix" and the "Underwater Mix," though only the "Up-In-Heaven Mix" received radio airplay and its own music video. The song received high marks for its production quality and sound, with praise towards its producers Jimmy Jam & Terry Lewis. Commercially, it reached number one on the Oricon Singles Chart and was certified quadruple platinum by the Recording Industry Association of Japan (RIAJ) for shipments of over 1.6 million. (Note: Initially received a 4× Platinum certification for 1,600,000 copies shipped, however the 4× Platinum threshold was retired in 2003.) It is Utada's second best-selling physical single behind "Automatic/Time Will Tell," which sold a combined 2.06 million copies. The album's second single, "Wait & See (Risk)", was released on April 19, 2000, with a physical edition that included a few B-side tracks and remixes. Critics also praised the single's sound and production value. It reached number one on the Oricon Singles Chart and was the album's second single to receive a quadruple RIAJ certification.

On June 30, 2000, the songs "For You" and "Time Limit" were packaged together and released as double A-side single. Both tracks had music videos, with Utada performing the song live. It received positive reviews from critics and debuted at number one on the Oricon Singles Chart. The single was certified triple platinum by the RIAJ after shipping over 1.2 million units in Japan. (Note: Initially received a 3× Platinum certification for 1,200,000 copies shipped, however the 3× Platinum threshold was retired in 2003.) The fourth and final single from the album, "Can You Keep a Secret?" debuted on February 16, 2001. "Can You Keep a Secret?" served as the theme song to the 2001 dorama Hero, in which Utada appeared as an actor. The song received positive reviews from publications and debuted at number one on the Oricon Singles Chart, earning them a final triple platinum certification from the RIAJ. It also received platinum and gold certifications for exceeding 250,000 digital downloads and 50 million streams, respectively.

The song "Distance" was originally planned to be a single without any alterations, but it was instead released in a rearranged ballad form called "Final Distance" in memory of a fan who died in the June 2001 Ikeda school massacre; this new version would appear in their next album, Deep River. Utada performed two shows in Japan to promote the album. The first was the Bohemian Summer 2000 show, which was released live on December 9, 2000, several months before Distance. A special event called Utada Hikaru Unplugged began in 2001, followed by a live release on November 28, 2001. This footage was taken from the unplugged live performance that aired on MTV Japan on August 12, 2001, in front of an audience of about 120 people at Tennoz Studio. Furthermore, a video collection titled Utada Hikaru Single Clip Collection Vol. 2 was released on September 27, 2001, which included all of the album's music videos as well as behind-the-scenes footage for each video.

== Critical reception ==
Professional ratings
Review scores
Source	Rating
AllMusic	4/5 stars
Hot Express	(favorable)
Rockin'On Japan	(favorable)

Ian Wade of AllMusic rated the album four stars. He praised the record's production and songwriting, writing, "Distance stands as one of Hikaru's most consistent and inventive albums, and comes across as a far more convincing example of R&B by a Japanese artist than their later attempts to crack the U.S. market." Music writer Tetsuo Hiraga of Hot Express praised Distance as “a work that expresses the dramatic ‘growth’ from First Love with the whole body,” and also pointed out the expansion of their musicality compared to their previous work. In his review of this album in Rockin'On Japan, Jun Shikano said, “Hikaru Utada's music is soulful and reflects the heart. It is both universal and primal."

From 1999 to 2002, the album and several singles won Japan Gold Disc Awards. Distance won Best Rock & Pop Album in 2002, and each of its four singles was named Song of the Year. The Japanese Society for Rights of Authors, Composers and Publishers (JASRAC Awards) honoured the album's single "Can You Keep a Secret?" with the Silver Award. The song also won the International Viewer's Award at the MTV Video Music Awards in 2002, as well as the Drama Song Award at the 2001 Television Drama Academy Awards.

== Release and commercial performance ==
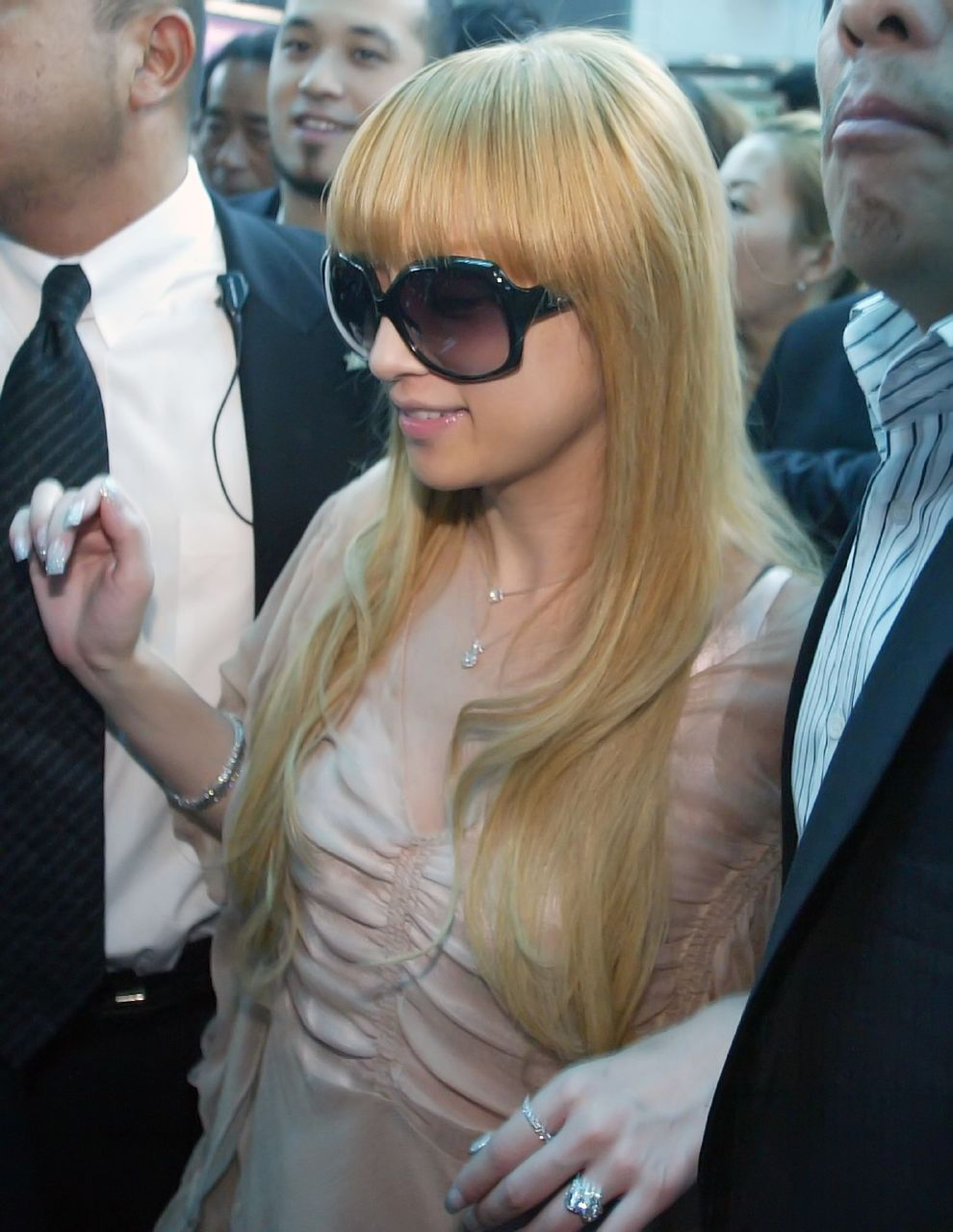
Distance was released alongside A Best by Japanese singer Ayumi Hamasaki (pictured), which generated huge significance in Japanese and Western music media.

Toshiba EMI released Distance on March 28, 2001, marking their second release with the label. In Japan, it was initially available on CD, double vinyl, and cassette, each with thirteen tracks. EMI Music later released the album in several Asian countries, including China, Indonesia, Malaysia, the Philippines, South Korea, Taiwan, and Thailand. Distance was re-released worldwide on January 23, 2019, via digital and streaming services, with a double vinyl edition re-issued in Japan by Universal Music on March 10, 2022.

Toshiba EMI had scheduled the album's release date for March 28. At the same time, Japanese record label Avex Trax planned to release A Best, the greatest hits album by Japanese singer Ayumi Hamasaki. Avex's strategy was to compete with Utada's album, as both Hamasaki and Utada were at the peak of their popularity at the time. The announcement of both album release dates sparked widespread controversy in Japanese and Western media, with claims that the two singers were "rivals" in professional as well as personal circumstances. Both singers claimed it was a label-sponsored campaign, with Hamasaki expressing her displeasure over a lack of material and creative control of A Best.

Both albums received extensive promotion prior to their release on March 28, but both were extremely successful in terms of first-week sales. In Japan, Distance ascended to number one on the Oricon Albums Chart, while A Best debuted at number two. Distance sold 3,002,720 copies in its first week and became the fastest-selling album in music history, a record it held until 2015, when Adele's third album 25 sold 3.4 million copies in its first week in the United States. It topped the charts for two nonconsecutive weeks while being dethroned by A Best in the second week. Distance had sold 4,404,290 units by the end of 2001, making it the best-selling album of the year, with A Best coming in second. Utada also topped the annual singles chart that year with “Can You Keep A Secret?” and dominated the singles and albums charts for the year.

The Recording Industry Association of Japan (RIAJ) certified the album quadruple million for selling more than four million copies, and Oricon reports that it sold more than 4.472 million in Japan. Oricon named it the best-selling Japanese album of the 2000s, and the International Federation of the Phonographic Industry (IFPI) ranked it as the tenth best-selling record of 2001. The album is currently the fourth best-selling album in Japan, trailing only Glay's greatest hits album Review and B'z's The Best's "Pleasure" and Utada's studio album First Love, the best-selling record in Japanese history.

== Track listing ==
All tracks are written by Hikaru Utada, except where noted.

No.	Title	Arranger	Length
1.	"Wait & See (Risk)"	Jimmy Jam and Terry Lewis; Hikaru Utada	4:48
2.	"Can You Keep a Secret?"	Akira Nishihira; Yuichiro Honda	5:08
3.	"Distance"	Kei Kawano; Hikaru Utada	5:30
4.	"Sunglass (サングラス, Sunglasses)"	Shin'ichiro Murayama	4:46
5.	"Drama (ドラマ, Drama)" (lyrics written by Utada; music composed by Utada and Takuro Kubo)	Yu'ichiro Honda	4:36
6.	"Eternally"	Shin'ichiro Murayama; Kei Kawano (strings arrangement)	4:45
7.	"Addicted to You (Up-in-Heaven Mix)"	Jam and Lewis; Jeff Taylor (mix)	5:19
8.	"For You"	Kei Kawano	5:22
9.	"Kettobase! (蹴っ飛ばせ!, Kick It!)"	Akira Nishihira; Hikaru Utada	4:31
10.	"Parody"	Kei Kawano	5:25
11.	"Time Limit (タイム・リミット, Taimu Rimitto)" (lyrics written by Utada; music composed by Utada and Takuro)	Rodney Jerkins	4:55
12.	"Kotoba ni Naranai Kimochi (言葉にならない気持ち, Indescribable Feelings)"	Shin'ichiro Murayama	5:03
13.	"Hayatochi-Remix (早とちリミックス, Jumping to Conclusions-Remix)" (bonus track)	Hikaru Utada	4:10
Total length:			64:26

Remaster Bonus track
No.	Title	Arranger	Length
14.	"Hayatochiri (はやとちり, Jumping to Conclusions)"	Hikaru Utada	4:17
Total length:			68:43

== Personnel ==
Personnel details were sourced from the Distance liner notes booklet.

- Miyake Akira – producer
- Nishihira Akira – arranger, keyboards, programming
- David Barry – guitar
- John Blackwell – drums
- Darnell Davis – keyboards
- Paul Foley – editing
- Steve Hodge – engineer, mixing
- Goh Hotoda – engineer, shaker, mixing
- Jimmy Jam – arranger, producer, musician
- Ted Jensen – mastering
- Rodney Jerkins – arranger, programming, producer, engineer, rap
- Terry Lewis – arranger, producer, musician
- Harvey Mason, Jr. – engineer, editing
- Michael McCoy – assistant engineer
- Alexander Richbourg – producer, drum programming
- Philippe Saisse – keyboards
- Dexter Simmons – mixing
- Xavier Smith – drum programming, assistant engineer
- Mike Tocci – assistant engineer
- Sanada Yoshiaki – executive producer
- Honda Yuichiro – guitar, arranger, keyboards, programming, pre-production arranger
- Toriyama Yuji – guitar

== Charts ==
=== Weekly chart ===
Chart (2001)	Peak position
Japanese Albums (Oricon)	1

=== Monthly charts ===
Chart (2001)	Peak position
Japanese Albums (Oricon)	1

=== Yearly chart ===
Chart (2001)	Position
Japanese Albums (Oricon)	1
Worldwide Albums (IFPI)	10

=== Decade-end charts ===
Chart (2000–2009)	Position
Japanese Albums (Oricon)	1

=== All-time chart ===
Chart	Position
Japanese Albums (Oricon)	4

== Certification and sales ==
Region	Certification	Certified units/sales
Japan (RIAJ)	4× Million	4,472,353
Singapore	—	10,000
Taiwan	—	250,000
Summaries
Asia	—	5,000,000

== Release history ==
Region	Date	Format(s)	Label	Ref.
Japan	March 28, 2001	CD; Cassette tape; vinyl	Eastworld	
China	2001	CD	Eastworld	
Indonesia	2001	CD	Eastworld	
Philippines	2001	CD	Eastworld	
South Korea	2001	CD	Eastworld	
Taiwan	2001	CD	Eastworld	
Thailand	2001	CD	Eastworld	
Various	January 23, 2019	Digital download	EMI Music	
Japan	March 10, 2022	Vinyl	Universal Music Japan	

== See also ==
- List of fastest-selling albums
- List of best-selling albums in Japan
- List of Oricon number-one albums of 2001
