= Wait & See (Risk) =

Single by Hikaru Utada

from the album Distance
- B-side: "Hayatochiri"; "Fly Me to the Moon (In Other Words)"
- Released: April 19, 2000
- Recorded: January 2000
- Studio: Flyte Tyme Studios, Minneapolis, Minnesota
- Genre: R&B; dance-pop; rock
- Length: 4:49
- Label: Toshiba EMI
- Songwriter: Hikaru Utada
- Producer: Jimmy Jam & Terry Lewis

Hikaru Utada singles chronology
"Addicted to You" (1999)	"Wait & See (Risk)" (2000)	"For You" (2000)

Music video
- "Wait & See (Risk)" on YouTube

"Wait & See (Risk)" (stylized as Wait & See ~リスク~) is a song recorded by Japanese–American singer Hikaru Utada for their third studio album, Distance (2001). It was released on April 19, 2000 as the second single from the album in Japan. It was written and composed by Utada, whilst production and arrangement was handled by Utada and American duo Jimmy Jam & Terry Lewis. The single also included the two B-side tracks, "Hayatochiri" and "Fly Me to the Moon (In Other Words)", with the former song appearing on the parent album. Musically, "Wait & See (Risk)" is an R&B song, influenced by dance-pop and rock.

Upon its release, the track garnered positive reviews from music critics. Many critics highlighted the track as one of Utada's best singles, and commended the production and composition. It was also successful in Japan, peaking at number one on both the Oricon Singles Chart and Tokyo Broadcasting System's (TBS) Count Down TV singles chart. It was certified Million by the Recording Industry Association of Japan (RIAJ) for physical shipments of one million units, and is amongst the best selling singles in Japan. An accompanying music video was shot by Wataru Takeishi; it features Utada driving through Shibuya, Tokyo on a futuristic hover cycle, with intercut scenes of them dancing. It was performed on some of their concert tours, including the Bohemian Summer (2000) and Utada United tours (2006).

== Background and composition ==
"Wait & See (Risk)" was written and composed by Utada, whilst production and arrangement was handled by Utada and American duo Jimmy Jam & Terry Lewis. It was the second time Utada worked with Jam and Lewis, and not with Teruzane Utada and Miyake Akira. The song included live instrumentation by Xavier Smith (drum machine) and Dave Barry (bass and acoustic guitar), whilst Jam and Lewis incorporated synthesizers and keyboards. The song was recorded and mixed by Steve Hodge, Indoh Mitsuhiro, and Ugajin Masaaki in 2000 at Flyte Tyme Studios, Minneapolis, Minnesota, and mixed at Flyte Tyme, Edina, Minnesota. It premiered on April 19, 2000 as the second single from Utada's third studio and second Japanese language album, Distance (2001) in Japan. Since then, the song has been remastered and re-released twice; the first on April 1, 2004, and the second time on December 9, 2014 for Utada's first greatest hits album Utada Hikaru Single Collection Vol. 1 (2003).

The single also included the two B-side tracks; "Hayatochiri" and "Fly Me to the Moon (In Other Words)". The original version of "Hayatochiri" appears on the single, whilst a remixed version by Utada appeared on Distance. "Fly Me to the Moon (In Other Words)" is a cover version that was originally written and performed by Bart Howard and Kaye Ballard in 1954; a second cover version sung by Utada appeared eight years later on the single "Kiss & Cry"/"Beautiful World". The maxi CD of the single contains all three new recordings, plus a remix by Baton Girl and instrumental version of "Wait & See (Risk)". The cover artwork of the single featured four images of Utada in front of a brown backdrop, two of which are transparent. The DVD single was released on June 30, 2000, which included new artwork of Utada in the speed bike, and the music video and the behind the scenes video. Musically, "Wait & See" is an R&B song, influenced by rock and dance-pop. Kano, editor in chief for Rockin'On Japan magazine noted elements of R&B music through the song's composition. When a staff editor from CD Journal reviewed Utada's first greatest hits album, Utada Hikaru Single Collection Vol. 1 (2004), he labeled the composition as "urban" and "speedy".

== Critical reception ==
Upon its release, "Wait & See (Risk)" received positive reviews from most music critics. Nagasawa Tomonori from Barks.com selected the song as one of the album's best tracks. Editor-in-chief for Rockin'On Japan magazine Kano commended the "excellent" composition of the song, and the "innovative" production by Jam and Lewis. AllMusic's Ian Martin praised Jam and Lewis' involvement, saying that "providing a stark contrast to the cheap, tinny sound that characterized much Japanese pop of the previous decade, with "Wait & See" and "Addicted to You" both featuring the production talents of Jimmy Jam & Terry Lewis." A staff reviewer from Yahoo! GeoCities was positive in their review, whom highlighted the single as one of the best tracks on the album.

A staff review from CD Journal discussed Utada's compilation Utada Hikaru Single Collection Vol. 1, and said although the vocal delivery "floats" and is "basic", it molded into one of Utada's "masterpieces". At the 15th Japan Gold Disc Awards, Utada won the Song of the Year award for "Wait & See (Risk)"; they had also won two same awards that year for their singles "For You" and "Time Limit". In December 2015, in honor of Utada's comeback into the music business, Japanese website Goo.ne.jp hosted a poll for fans to rank their favourite songs by Utada out of 25 positions; the poll was held in only twenty-four hours, and thousands submitted their votes. As a result, "Wait & See (Risk)" was ranked at number 10 with 40 votes in total.

== Commercial response ==
Commercially, "Wait & See (Risk)" was a success in Japan. It became their third single to debut at number one on the Oricon Singles Chart, with 804,570 units sold in its first week. Its first week sales made it the 13th highest on Oricon Database, their second single behind "Addicted to You" with 1.067 million first week units, and the only female artist to occupy the top twenty with three entries. It stayed at number one for a sole week, and spent a total of 21 weeks on that chart. By the end of 2000, the single was ranked at number three on Oricon's Annual 2000 chart; it sold 1,662,060 units by the end of the year. This became Utada's highest entry in that annual chart, the highest selling female recording artist based on single sales, and made "Wait & See (Risk)" the highest selling single of 2000 by a female recording artist. The single was certified quadruple platinum by the Recording Industry Association of Japan (RIAJ) for physical shipments of 1.6 million units.

The single debuted at number one on Tokyo Broadcasting System's (TBS) Count Down TV chart during the chart week of April 29, 2000, their fifth consecutive single to do so. The single stayed in the chart for 20 weeks, and was ranked at number four on their 2000 Annual Chart. The B-side track, "Fly Me to the Moon (In Other Words)", debuted at number 22 during the chart week of May 20, 2000. It slipped to number 87 the following week, and was present for two weeks. According to the Oricon Style database, the single is Utada's second highest selling single, and is currently ranked by Music TV Program as the fiftieth best selling single in Japanese music history, their third highest entry behind "Addicted to You" and "Automatic/Time Will Tell". (Note: According to Oricon Style, "Wait & See (Risk)" is her second best selling single behind "Addicted to You". However, Utada's debut A-side singles "Automatic" and "Time Will Tell" sold 1,290,700 12cm CD units, and an additional 772,080 8cm CD units, which makes it Utada's highest selling single as a collective release. Both formats were listed on their best sellers list.)

== Music video ==
An accompanying music video was directed by Wataru Takeishi. The video opens with Utada entering a warehouse, and lifts a tarp off a hover cycle. As the camera pans away from the bike, Utada sits down and starts the bike. The first verse opens with Utada singing to the camera in a warehouse, whilst intercut scenes have their driving throughout Shibuya. As the verse progresses, two more clones of Utada appear and sing behind the original Utada. As the chorus starts, the hover cycle starts grinding against the road as they ride through small streets and corners. During the second verse, Utada stops through a city centre as shots of the clones appear on city billboards. They take off their goggles and stare at the moon while close-ups of the clones' faces are seen singing to the track.

The second chorus has the clones singing in different parts of the warehouse, with scenes of Utada driving through the subways in Shibuya. By the bridge section, the clones disappear and the original Utada is singing in the warehouse. They are then shown driving through tunnels at night, eventually stopping at the warehouse they had started from. They turn off the bike during the final scene of the video, put the tarp back on, and walk outside of the warehouse. The music video and the "behind the scenes" video was included on their Single Clip Collection Vol. 2 (2000).

== Live performances and promotion ==
The single has been performed on majority of Utada's concert tours. Its first performance was during their Bohemian Summer Tour in 2000, which was included on the live release on December 9, 2000. It was then included on Utada's exclusive MTV Unplugged concert, serving as the opening number. It was included on the live DVD, released on November 28, 2001. They later performed it in 2004, during their Budokan concert tour. It appeared on the live DVD, which was released on July 28, 2004. It was included on Utada's debut English concert tour named Utada United, which was later included on the live DVD, released on December 20, 2006. Since the track's release, it has appeared on three compilation releases: Utada Hikaru Single Collection Vol. 1 (2003), its 2014 remastered version, and a special bundle of the compilation and the vol. 2 collection on a USB.

== Track listings and formats ==
- CD single
1. "Wait & See (Risk)" – 4:49
2. "Hayatochiri (はやとちり)" – 4:15
3. "Fly Me to the Moon (In Other Words)" – 3:23
4. "Wait & See (Risk)" (Baton Girl Remix) – 4:50
5. "Wait & See (Risk)" (Instrumental) – 4:49
- DVD single
1. "Wait & See (Risk)" (Music video)
2. "Wait & See (Risk)" (Behind the scenes video)

== Credits and personnel ==
Details adapted from the liner notes of the single's CD release.

Recording

- Recorded at Flyte Tyme Studios, Minneapolis, Minnesota, and mixed at Flyte Tyme, Edina, Minnesota.

Personnel

- Hikaru Utada – songwriting, production, composition
- Jimmy Jam and Terry Lewis – arrangement, instruments, production, composition
- Teruzane Utada – arrangement, production, composition
- Akira Miyake – arrangement, production, composition
- Steve Hodge – guitar, recording
- Xavier Smith – drums
- Indoh Mitsuhiro – recording
- Ugajin Masaaki – recording

== Charts ==
=== Weekly charts ===
Chart (2000)	Peak position
Japan Singles (Oricon)	1
Japan Count Down TV Chart (TBS)	1

=== Monthly charts ===
Chart (2000)	Peak position
Japan Singles (Oricon)	2

=== Year-end charts ===
Chart (2000)	Peak position
Japan Singles (Oricon)	3
Japan Count Down TV Chart (TBS)	4

=== Decade-end charts ===
Chart (2000–2009)	Position
Japan Singles (Oricon)	5

=== All-time chart ===
Chart	Position
Japan Singles (Oricon)	50

== Certifications ==
Region	Certification	Certified units/sales
Japan (RIAJ) Physical single	4× Platinum	1,662,060
