= Addicted to You (Hikaru Utada song) =

Single by Hikaru Utada

from the album Distance
- Released: November 10, 1999
- Recorded: 1999
- Genre: R&B
- Label: EMI Music Japan
- Songwriter: Hikaru Utada
- Producer: Jimmy Jam & Terry Lewis

Hikaru Utada singles chronology
"First Love" (1999)	"Addicted to You" (1999)	"Wait & See (Risk)" (2000)

Music video
- "Addicted To You (Up-In-Heaven Mix)" on YouTube

"Addicted to You" is a song by Japanese-American recording artist Hikaru Utada from their third studio album Distance (2001). It was released as the album's lead single on November 10, 1999, by EMI Music Japan. "Addicted to You" was written by Utada and produced by Jimmy Jam & Terry Lewis, marking Utada's first collaboration with American producers and composers. The single artwork was shot by American photographer Richard Avedon and features two black-and-white figures of Utada. Musically, "Addicted to You" is an R&B song.

"Addicted to You" received positive reviews from music critics, who described it as "nostalgic" and highlighted it as a standout from the parent album. It was commercially successful in Japan, with a peak position of number one on the Oricon Singles Chart and a Million certification by the Recording Industry Association of Japan (RIAJ). The single remains the fourth highest selling single in first week sales, and the thirty-ninth best selling single in Japan. A music video was shot in Hong Kong, and featured Utada inside a club. Utada has performed the song on several of their concert tours, beginning with the Bohemian Summer 2000 tour.

== Background and release ==
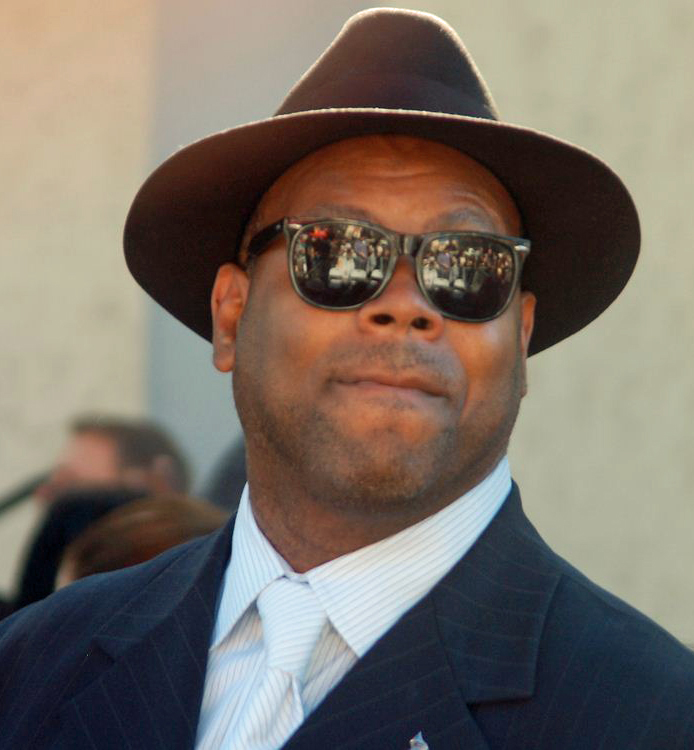
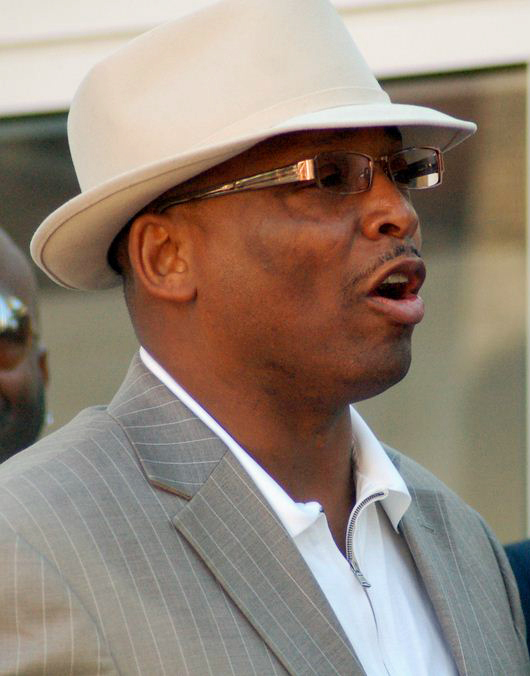
Jimmy Jam & Terry Lewis produced several tracks for Utada's album Distance

"Addicted to You" is an R&B song that was written by Utada and produced by Jimmy Jam & Terry Lewis; the song was Utada's first collaboration with American producers and composers. The song was recorded in mid-1999 at Flyte Tyme Studios, Minneapolis, Minnesota and mixed at Flyte Tyme, Edina, Minnesota. Darnell Davis played the keyboard and Alex Richbourg played the drums. There are two versions of the track: the Up-in-Heaven mix and the Underwater mix. EMI did not originally select "Addicted to You" as the lead single as they feared it would not make an impact in Japan. The song was then re-composed in order to appeal more to the Japanese audience.

"Addicted to You" was released on November 10, 1999, in CD format by EMI, as the lead single for the singer's third studio album Distance (2001). The cover sleeve features two shots of Utada, one being a close-up of Utada's face and the second being a long shot of them, and was photographed by American artist Richard Avedon in his only collaboration with Utada before his death in 2004. The CD featured the instrumental and radio edits of both versions.

== Critical reception ==
"Addicted to You" received positive reviews from music critics. Editor-in-chief for Rockin'On Japan magazine Kano said that the song was "exceptional" and commended their collaboration with Jam and Lewis. Yonemoto Hiromi from Yeah!! J-Pop! was positive in his review, feeling that the composition sounded "nostalgic"-like. A staff review from CDJournal discussed Utada's first greatest hits compilation Utada Hikaru Single Collection Vol. 1 and commended Utada's "fine" vocal delivery and composition. Ian Martin from Allmusic also commended Jam and Lewis' collaboration, saying that "providing stark contrast to the cheap, tinny sound that characterized much Japanese pop of the previous decade, with "Wait & See" and "Addicted to You" both featuring the production talents of Jimmy Jam & Terry Lewis." Miko Amaranthine from Yahoo! Music listed the song at number four on his Top Ten Hikaru Utada songs, stating ""Addicted to you" is one of my favorites for a slightly greedy purpose [...] When I listen to this song, I am reminded how much I love my marriage and am thankful I do not have to play the "dating game."" At the 15th Annual Japan Gold Disc Awards, "Addicted to You" and Utada's previous singles "Automatic" and "Movin' on Without You" received the award for "Song of the Year."

== Commercial response ==
"Addicted to You" debuted at number one on the Japanese Oricon Singles Chart, Utada's second chart-topper since "Movin' on Without You," and stayed in the chart for fifteen weeks. Initial shipments to stores totaled 1.3 million copies, with an additional order for 400,000 copies placed with Toshiba EMI on the day of release. "Addicted to You" debuted at number one with sales of 1,067,510 copies, making it the second fastest-selling single in Japan behind Mr. Children's "Namonaki Uta," but both positions were replaced by AKB48's "Everyday, Katyusha" and "Flying Get" in 2011. "Addicted to You" stayed at number one on its second week, logging sales of 222,580 copies. The song was certified Million by the RIAJ for shipments of one million units, selling 1.7 million units in total. "Addicted to You" is the 39th best-selling single in Japanese music history and Utada's second best-selling single behind "Automatic/Time Will Tell." According to Oricon, the song was Utada's fourth million-selling single. (Note: These singles are also her million-selling certified singles: "Automatic/Time Will Tell certification" (PDF). Oricon. Archived from the original (PDF) on January 22, 2014.; "Moving on Without You certification" (PDF). Oricon. Archived from the original (PDF) on January 17, 2014.; "Wait & See (Risk) certification" (PDF). Oricon. Archived from the original (PDF) on December 29, 2013.; "For You/Time Limit certification" (PDF). Oricon. Archived from the original (PDF) on January 22, 2014.; "Can You Keep a Secret? certification" (PDF). Oricon. Archived from the original (PDF) on January 17, 2014.; "Traveling certification" (PDF). Oricon. Archived from the original (PDF) on January 16, 2014.; "Colors certification". Oricon.) (Note: According to Oricon, the songs "For You," "Time Limit," "Travelling" and "Colors" did not sell over one million units in Japan but was certified Million by the Recording Industry Association of Japan (RIAJ))

"Addicted to You" reached number one on the Japanese Count Down TV Chart for two weeks, and remained on the chart for thirteen weeks. This was their fourth consecutive number one on the chart, following "Automatic/Time Will Tell," "Movin' on Without You," and "First Love." In the Annual 1999 Count Down TV chart, "Addicted to You" was placed at number five.

== Promotion and other appearances ==
Wataru Takeishi directed the accompanying music video, which was filmed in Hong Kong and featured Utada inside a nightclub. The music video was included on Utada's Single Clip Collection Vol. 1 (1999). "Addicted to You" has been included in four of Utada's live Japanese concert tours: Bohemian Summer 2000, Utada Unplugged, Utada in Budokan 2004-2005, and Utada United 2006. The live versions were then released on a live DVD for each tour.

== Track listing ==
CD single

1. "Addicted to You" (Up-in-Heaven mix) – 5:19
2. "Addicted to You" (Underwater mix) – 6:17
3. "Addicted to You" (Up-in-Heaven mix) (Instrumental) – 4:08
4. "Addicted to You" (Underwater mix) (Instrumental) – 5:21

== Personnel ==
- Hikaru Utada – songwriting, composition
- Jerry Jam and Terry Lewis – arrangement, instruments, production, composition
- Teruzane Utada – arrangement, production, composition
- Akira Miyake – arrangement, production, composition
- Steve Hodge – guitar, recording
- Alex Richbourg – drums
- Darnell Davis – keyboards
- Indoh Mitsuhiro – recording
- Ugajin Masaaki – recording
- Richard Avedon – recording

Credits adapted from the promotional CD single.

== Charts and certifications ==
=== Weekly charts ===
Chart (1999)	Peak position
Japan Singles (Oricon)	1
Japan Count Down TV Chart (TBS)	1

=== Monthly charts ===
Chart (1999)	Peak position
Japan Singles (Oricon)	1

=== Year-end charts ===
Chart (1999)	Peak position
Japan Singles (Oricon)	6
Japan Count Down TV Chart (TBS)	5

2008 year-end charts for Addicted to You
Chart (2000)	Position
Japan Singles (Oricon)	48

=== Decade-end charts ===
Chart (1990–1999)	Position
Japan Singles (Oricon)	27

=== All-time chart ===
Chart	Peak position
Japan Singles (Oricon)	39

== Certifications ==
Region	Certification	Certified units/sales
Japan (RIAJ) Physical	Million	1,784,000
