= Can You Keep a Secret? (song) =

2001 single by Hikaru Utada

Single by Hikaru Utada

from the album Distance
- B-side: "Kettobase!"
- Released: February 16, 2001
- Recorded: 2000
- Studio: The Hit Factory; Bunkamura Studio
- Genre: J-pop; dance-pop
- Length: 5:08
- Label: EMI Music Japan
- Songwriter: Hikaru Utada
- Producer: Hikaru Utada

Hikaru Utada singles chronology
"For You" (2000)	"Can You Keep a Secret?" (2001)	"Final Distance" (2001)

Music video
- "Can You Keep a Secret?" on YouTube

"Can You Keep a Secret?" is the seventh single by Japanese-American recording artist Hikaru Utada. It was released on February 16, 2001, by Toshiba EMI and serves as the last single from their third studio album Distance (2001). The song was written and composed entirely by Utada. It was the ending theme song for the dorama called Hero (2001), in which Utada had their acting debut, appearing in a cameo as a waitress, and starring Takuya Kimura.

Musically, "Can You Keep A Secret?" is an upbeat R&B and dance-pop song that takes on the cross fusion of pop and R&B which was popular in the United States around the time of its release. Lyrically, the song talks about a woman expressing her love and asking her partner if they can keep it a secret. The song was warmly received by music critics, praising its production and Utada's vocals and songwriting; some of them going as far to describe it as a highlight in their discography.

Commercially, "Can You Keep A Secret" was a massive success at home. The song ascended to number one on the Oricon Singles Chart and became Japan's best-performing single of 2001. In all, it sold over 1.48 million units nationwide and was ultimately Utada's last single to sell over a million copies. A music video was made for the song, which features a robot called Pino. Some of the filming took place on Utada's birthday. The song has since been played live on several occasions, including in the 2006 concert tour Utada United 2006.

== Commercial performance ==
"Can You Keep a Secret?" debuted at number one on the Oricon chart, selling 783,620 in its first week, and was their third single to be number one for two consecutive weeks. 1.31 million copies were shipped to stores in a single day. The single stayed in the charts for eleven weeks. "Can You Keep a Secret?" has sold 1,485,000 to date and became the number one single of 2001 in Japan. In the World Charts, "Can You Keep a Secret?" reached number 37 for single airplay and number 9 for sales. The single sold 1,484,940 units as of May 2006.

== Music video and live performances ==
The music video for this song includes a robot whom Utada appears to be in a relationship with. In the end, it has been revealed that Utada, too, is a robot during the relationship. It also shows Hikaru singing in a futuristic room full of pink lights. The robot used in the video was the robot "Pino" created by Hisashi Taniguchi. Utada performed "Can You Keep a Secret?" on their 2010 tour, Utada: In the Flesh 2010.

== Track listing ==
All tracks are written by Hikaru Utada.

No.	Title	Arranger	Length
1.	"Can You Keep a Secret?"	Akira Nishihira	5:08
2.	"Kettobase! (蹴っ飛ばせ!)"	Akira Nishihira, Hikaru Utada	4:31
3.	"Can You Keep a Secret?" (Original Karaoke)		5:08

== Charts ==
=== Weekly charts ===
Chart (2001)	Peak position
Japan Singles (Oricon)	1

=== Year-end charts ===
Chart (2001)	Position
Japan Singles (Oricon)	1
Taiwan (Yearly Singles Top 100)	14

== Certifications ==
Certifications for "Can You Keep a Secret"
Region	Certification	Certified units/sales
Japan (RIAJ) Physical sales	Million	1,484,940
Japan (RIAJ) Digital single	Platinum	250,000^{*}
Streaming
Japan (RIAJ)	Platinum	100,000,000^{†}
^{*} Sales figures based on certification alone.^{†} Streaming-only figures based on certification alone.
