= Teruzane Utada =

Teruzane Utada 宇多田照實
- Born: July 21, 1948 (age 77); Tokuji, Japan (now Yamaguchi, Japan)
- Occupations: Singer, songwriter, producer, composer, arranger
- Instruments: Guitar, drums
- Spouse: Keiko Fuji (m. 1982; div. 2007)

Teruzane Utada (宇多田 照實, Utada Teruzane; born July 21, 1948) is a Japanese record producer and record executive.

He married Junko Utada (née Keiko Fuji) and oversaw her career. They were married to and divorced each other seven times. Their only child is the singer Hikaru Utada, one of Japan's most successful pop music singers of all time.

Teruzane Utada was born in Tokuji, Utada also uses the names Sking U, Utada Sking Teruzane, and Utada Skingg Teruzane.

== Musical works ==
=== Only lyrics ===
==== For Joe Hisaishi ====
- 1986: THE WINTER REQUIEM (album: CURVED MUSIC)
- 1986: A RAINBOW IN CURVED MUSIC (album: CURVED MUSIC)
- 1989: MEET ME TONIGHT (album: PRETENDER)
- 1989: TRUE SOMEBODY (album: PRETENDER)
- 1989: WONDER CITY (album: PRETENDER)
- 1989: ALL DAY PRETENDER (album: PRETENDER)

Composer: Joe Hisaishi

==== For J-WALK (now named "THE JAYWALK") ====
- 1987: YOU MAKE ME FEEL SO ALIVE (album: Owari no nai natsu)
- 1987: BELIEVE ME (album: Owari no nai natsu)

Composer: Izumi Tsunehiro

=== Only composer ===
==== For U3 ====
- 1993: STAR (album: STAR)
- 1993: Ikirukoto o oshiete kureta (album: STAR)

Co-writer by SKING U & RA U.

==== For Keiko Fuji ====
- 1994: Sake ni you hodo (single: Sake ni you hodo)
- 1997: Otome (single: Otome)
- 1997: Daite... (single: Otome)

Co-writer by SKING U & RA U

=== Singer ===
==== U3 ====
- 1993: Umareta toki kara I Love You (album: STAR)
- 1993: New York Serenade (album: STAR)

Co-writer by SKING U & RA U

==== Keiko Fuji with Cubic U ====
- 1996: Tsumetai tsuki 〜 nakanaide 〜 (single: Tsumetai tsuki 〜 nakanaide 〜)
- 1996: Golden Era (single: Tsumetai tsuki 〜 nakanaide 〜)

Co-writer by SKING U & RA U
