= Hikaru Utada singles discography =

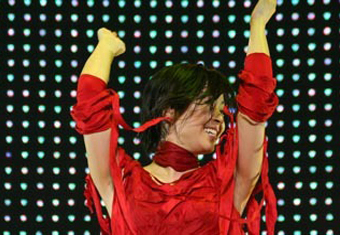
- Utada in 2006
- Singles: 54
- Promotional singles: 23
- Collaboration singles: 11

The singles discography of Japanese and American singer Hikaru Utada consists of fifty-four singles, twenty-three promotional singles and eleven collaboration singles. Utada began as a musician in the early 1990s as a member of U^{3}, a family unit made up of Utada, their mother Junko Utada, also known as 1970s enka singer Keiko Fuji, and their father, musical producer Teruzane Utada. U^{3} released their debut album Star in 1993, with the hope to debut in America. In 1996, the group was rebranded as Cubic U, an R&B project focusing on Hikaru Utada, resulting in the English language album Precious in 1998 with record label Toshiba EMI.

== As lead artist ==
=== 1990s ===
List of 1990s singles, with selected chart positions
Title	Year	Peak chart positions								Sales (Note: Sales are for physical single sales, unless otherwise noted.)	Certifications	Album
Title	Year	JPN	JPN Cmb.	JPN Hot (Note: Sources for chart positions are as follows: "Stay Gold", "Heart Station", "Fight the Blues", "Prisoner of Love", "Eternally", "Come Back to Me", "Beautiful World (Planitb Acoustica Mix)", "Hymne à l'amour (Ai no Anthem)", "Goodbye Happiness", "Can't Wait 'Til Christmas", "Show Me Love (Not a Dream)", "Sakura Nagashi", "Chikai" & "Face My Fears", "One Last Kiss", "Pink Blood", "Kimi ni Muchū", "Bad Mode", "Gold (Mata au Hi Made)", "Naniiro Demonai Hana", "Mine or Yours", "Jane Doe", "Pappaparadise")	HK	SGP Reg.	TWN	TWN Bill.	WW	Sales	Certifications	Album
"Time Will Tell"	1998	2	—	—	—	—	—	—	—	JPN: 2,063,000 (plus 250,000 (dig.) for "Automatic")		First Love
"Automatic"	1998	2	—	73 (Note: Charted in 2014)	—	—	3	—	—	JPN: 2,063,000 (plus 250,000 (dig.) for "Automatic")	RIAJ: Million (phy.) (Note: Initially received a 4× Platinum certification for 1,600,000 copies shipped, however the 4× Platinum threshold was retired in 2003.); Platinum (dig.); Platinum (str.)	First Love
"Movin' On Without You"	1999	1	—	— (Note: Charted at number 63 on the Streaming Songs chart in 2017.)	—	—	—	—	—	JPN: 1,227,000	RIAJ: Million (phy.) (Note: Received a 3× Platinum certification for 1,200,000 copies, however the 3× Platinum threshold was redefined as 750,000 copies in 2003.)	First Love
"First Love"	1999	2	11	5 (Note: Charted in 2022)	2	17	1	1	147	JPN: 804,000 (plus 500,000 (dig.))	RIAJ: 3× Platinum (phy.) (Note: Received a 2× Platinum certification for 800,000 copies, however the 2× Platinum threshold was redefined as 800,000 copies in 2003.); 2× Platinum (dig.); 3× Platinum (str.)	First Love
"Addicted to You"	1999	1	—	— (Note: Charted at number 58 on the Streaming Songs chart in 2017.)	—	—	—	—	—	JPN: 1,784,000	RIAJ: Million (phy.)	Distance
"—" denotes a recording that did not chart.

=== 2000s ===
List of 2000s singles, with selected chart positions
Title	Year	Peak chart positions				Sales (Note: Sales are for physical single sales, unless otherwise noted.)	Certifications	Album
Title	Year	JPN	JPN Hot	US Dance Club	US World	Sales	Certifications	Album
"Wait & See (Risk)"	2000	1 (Note: Also charted at number 1 on the DVD chart.)	— (Note: Charted at number 39 on the Streaming Songs chart in 2017.)	—	—	JPN: 1,662,000	RIAJ: Million (phy.)	Distance
"For You"	2000	1	— (Note: Charted at number 85 on the Streaming Songs chart in 2017.)	—	—	JPN: 889,000	RIAJ: Million (phy.)	Distance
"Time Limit"	2000	1	—	—	—	JPN: 889,000	RIAJ: Million (phy.)	Distance
"Can You Keep a Secret?"	2001	1	— (Note: Charted at number 18 on the Streaming Songs chart in 2017.)	—	—	JPN: 1,485,000 (plus 250,000 (dig.))	RIAJ: Million (phy.); Platinum (dig.); Platinum (str.)	Distance
"Final Distance"	2001	2	— (Note: Charted at number 65 on the Streaming Songs chart in 2017.)	—	—	JPN: 582,000	RIAJ: Platinum (phy.)	Deep River
"Traveling"	2001	1	27	—	—	JPN: 856,000 (plus 100,000 (dig.))	RIAJ: Million (phy.); Gold (rt.); Gold (str.)	Deep River
"Hikari"	2002	1	5 (Note: Charted in 2017. Though Hikari's Ray of Hope Mix was promoted as a separate release, Billboard Japan combined the remix with the original single version for charting purposes.)	—	3 (Note: Charted in 2019 as "Simple And Clean")	JPN: 598,000 (plus 100,000 (dig.))	RIAJ: 3× Platinum (phy.); Gold (rt.)	Deep River
"Sakura Drops"	2002	1	74 (Note: Charted in 2012.)	—	—	JPN: 687,000 (plus 100,000 (dig.))	RIAJ: 3× Platinum (phy.); Gold (rt.)	Deep River
"Letters"	2002	1	—	—	—	JPN: 687,000 (plus 100,000 (dig.))		Deep River
"Colors"	2003	1	— (Note: Charted at number 77 on the Adult Alternative Airplay chart in 2011, and at number 26 on the Streaming Songs chart in 2017.)	—	—	JPN: 894,000 (plus 100,000 (dig.))	RIAJ: Million (phy.); Gold (DVD); Gold (rt.)	Single Collection Vol. 1 / Ultra Blue
"Dareka no Negai ga Kanau Koro"	2004	1 (Note: Also charted at number 10 on the DVD chart.)	— (Note: Charted at number 46 on the Streaming Songs chart in 2017.)	—	—	JPN: 365,000 (plus 250,000 (dig.))	RIAJ: 2× Platinum (phy.); 2× Platinum (str.); Platinum (dig.)	Our Last Day: Casshern / Ultra Blue
"Easy Breezy" (as Utada)	2004	15 (Note: Charted on the DVD chart.)	—	—	—	JPN: 18,000	RIAJ: 2× Platinum (rt.)	Exodus
"Devil Inside" (as Utada)	2004	—	—	1	—			Exodus
"Exodus '04" (as Utada)	2005	—	—	24	—			Exodus
"Be My Last"	2005	1	— (Note: Charted at number 98 on the Streaming Songs chart in 2017.)	—	—	JPN: 151,000 (plus 100,000 (dig.))	RIAJ: 2× Platinum (phy.); 2× Platinum (rt.); Gold (PC)	Ultra Blue
"You Make Me Want to Be a Man" (as Utada)	2005	—	—	—	—			Exodus (UK Edition)
"Passion" / "Sanctuary"	2005	4	—	—	7	JPN: 112,000 (plus 200,000 (dig.))	RIAJ: Gold (phy.); Gold (rt.)	Ultra Blue
"Keep Tryin'"	2006	2	— (Note: Charted at number 73 on the Streaming Songs chart in 2017.)	—	—	JPN: 135,000 (plus 200,000 (dig.))	RIAJ: Platinum (phy.); 3× Platinum (rt.); Gold (PC)	Ultra Blue
"This Is Love" (Note: Despite receiving a digital only release, "This Is Love" was described as a single by Utada's official website.)	2006	—	—	—	—	JPN: 350,000	RIAJ: 2× Platinum (rt.); RIAJ: Gold (PC)	Ultra Blue
"Boku wa Kuma"	2006	4	—	—	—	JPN: 147,000 (plus 100,000 (dig.))	RIAJ: Gold (phy.); Gold (rt.)	Heart Station
"Flavor of Life"	2007	1	— (Note: Charted at number 5 on the Streaming Songs chart in 2017.)	—	—	JPN: 671,000 (plus 2,100,000 (dig.))	RIAJ: 3× Platinum (phy.); Platinum (str.); 2× Million (rt.) (Note: Standard version); Million (rt.) (Note: Ballad version); Platinum (PC); Gold (PC)	Heart Station
"Kiss & Cry"	2007	2	—	—	—	JPN: 245,000 (plus 200,000 (dig.) for "Kiss & Cry" and 1,000,000 for "Beautiful World")	RIAJ: 2× Platinum (rt.); Gold (PC)	Heart Station
"Beautiful World"	2007	2	80 (Note: Charted in 2021.)	—	—	JPN: 245,000 (plus 200,000 (dig.) for "Kiss & Cry" and 1,000,000 for "Beautiful World")	RIAJ: Platinum (phy.); Million (dig.); 2× Platinum (rt.); Platinum (str.)	Heart Station
"Stay Gold"	2008	3	1	—	—	JPN: 81,000 (plus 100,000 (dig.) for "Stay Gold" and 350,000 for "Heart Station")	RIAJ: 2× Platinum (rt.)	Heart Station
"Heart Station"	2008	3	2	—	—	JPN: 81,000 (plus 100,000 (dig.) for "Stay Gold" and 350,000 for "Heart Station")	RIAJ: Gold (phy.); Platinum (dig.); Gold (PC)	Heart Station
"Prisoner of Love"	2008	2	2	—	—	JPN: 84,000 (plus 1,100,000 (dig.))	RIAJ: Gold (phy.); Million (rt.); Gold (PC); Gold (str.)	Heart Station
"Come Back to Me" (as Utada)	2009	—	3	5	—	JPN: 100,000	RIAJ: Gold (str.)	This Is the One
"Dirty Desire" (as Utada)	2009	—	—	16	—			This Is the One
"—" denotes a recording that did not chart.

=== 2010s ===
List of 2010s singles, with selected chart positions
Title	Year	Peak chart positions					Sales (Note: Sales are for physical single sales, unless otherwise noted.)	Certifications	Album
Title	Year	JPN	JPN Cmb.	JPN Hot	US	US World	Sales	Certifications	Album
"Hymne à l'amour (Ai no Anthem)" (Note: "Hymne à l'amour (Ai no Anthem)" and "Goodbye Happiness" were songs that received a digitally exclusively release, described as singles by Utada's official website.)	2010	—	—	7	—	—			Single Collection Vol. 2
"Goodbye Happiness"	2010	—	—	1	—	—	JPN: 200,000	RIAJ: Gold (str.); Gold (PC)	Single Collection Vol. 2
"Sakura Nagashi"	2012	4 (Note: Charted on the DVD chart.)	—	2	—	10	JPN: 33,000 (plus 500,000 (dig.))	RIAJ: 2× Platinum (dig.)	Fantôme
"Hanataba o Kimi ni"	2016	—	—	2	—	—		RIAJ: 3× Platinum (dig.); Platinum (str.)	Fantôme
"Manatsu no Tōriame"	2016	—	—	5	—	—	JPN: 250,000	RIAJ: Platinum (dig.)	Fantôme
"Michi"	2016	—	—	5	—	—	JPN: 250,000	RIAJ: Platinum (dig.); Platinum (str.)	Fantôme
"Ōzora de Dakishimete"	2017	—	—	3	—	21	JPN: 100,000	RIAJ: Gold (dig.)	Hatsukoi
"Forevermore"	2017	—	—	6	—	20	JPN: 100,000	RIAJ: Gold (dig.)	Hatsukoi
"Anata"	2017	—	—	2	—	12	JPN: 285,000	RIAJ: Platinum (dig.); Platinum (str.)	Hatsukoi
"Play a Love Song"	2018	—	—	4	—	—	JPN: 114,000	RIAJ: Gold (dig.)	Hatsukoi
"Hatsukoi"	2018	—	—	2	—	—	JPN: 250,000	RIAJ: Platinum (dig.); Gold (str.)	Hatsukoi
"Chikai / Don't Think Twice"	2018	6	3	41	—	3	JPN: 31,000 (plus 46,000 (dig.) for "Chikai" and 41,000 for "Face My Fears")		Hatsukoi
"Face My Fears" (with Skrillex)	2019	6	3	3	98	1	JPN: 31,000 (plus 46,000 (dig.) for "Chikai" and 41,000 for "Face My Fears")		Bad Mode
"—" denotes a recording that did not chart.

=== 2020s ===
List of 2020s singles, with selected chart positions
Title	Year	Peak chart positions								Sales (Note: Sales are for digital single sales, unless otherwise noted.)	Certifications	Album
Title	Year	JPN	JPN Cmb.	JPN Hot	HK	KOR	TWN Bill.	US World	WW	Sales	Certifications	Album
"Time"	2020	—	4	7	—	—	—	16	—	JPN: 105,000	RIAJ: Gold (dig.); Gold (str.)	Bad Mode
"Dare ni mo Iwa Nai"	2020	—	20	28	—	—	—	21	—	JPN: 20,000		Bad Mode
"One Last Kiss"	2021	—	1	1	—	—	—	11	40	JPN: 250,000	RIAJ: Platinum (dig.); 2× Platinum (str.)	One Last Kiss / Bad Mode
"Pink Blood"	2021	—	24	16	—	—	—	20	—	JPN: 22,000		Bad Mode
"Kimi ni Muchū"	2021	—	6	2	—	—	—	14	55	JPN: 128,000	RIAJ: Gold (dig.); Platinum (str.)	Bad Mode
"First Love (2022 Mix)"	2022	6	27	—	23	—	—	—	—	JPN: 6,991 (phy.)	RIAJ: Gold (str.)	Science Fiction
"Hatsukoi (2022 Remastering)"	2022	6	27	—	—	—	—	—	—	JPN: 6,991 (phy.)		Science Fiction
"Gold (Mata au Hi Made)"	2023	—	35	10	—	—	—	—	—	JPN: 32,000		Science Fiction
"Naniiro de mo Nai Hana"	2024	—	20	4	—	—	—	—	—	JPN: 24,334		Science Fiction
"Somewhere Near Marseilles" (Sci-Fi Edit)	2024	—	—	— (Note: "Somewhere Near Marseilles" (Sci-Fi Edit) did not enter the Billboard Japan Hot 100 chart but peaked at number 93 on the component Download Songs chart.)	—	—	—	—				Science Fiction
"Mine or Yours"	2025	15	—	13	—	—	—	—	—	JPN: 5,852		Non-album single
"Electricity"	2025	31	—	— (Note: "Electricity" did not enter the Billboard Japan Hot 100 chart, but peaked at number 74 on the Billboard Japan Top Download Songs chart.)	—	—	—	—	—			Science Fiction
"Jane Doe" (with Kenshi Yonezu)	2025	2	1	2	5	16	3	4	32		RIAJ: Platinum (phy.); Gold (dig.); 2× Platinum (str.)	Non-album singles
"Pappaparadise"	2026	8	20	7	—	—	—	—	—	JPN: 7,497		Non-album singles
"—" denotes a recording that did not chart.

== As featured artist ==
List of singles, with selected chart positions
Title	Year	Peak chart positions		Sales	Album
Title	Year	JPN	JPN Hot (Note: Sources for chart positions are as follows: "Anata ga Matteru", "The Sun & Moon in Tokyo", and "Home")	Sales	Album
"Rainy Day" (among Cubic U)	1995	—	—		Non-album singles
"New Life" (among Cubic U)	1995	—	—		Non-album singles
"Tsumetai Tsuki (Nakanaide)" (冷たい月 ～泣かないで～; "Cold Moon: Don't Cry") (Keiko Fuji with Cubic U)	1996	—	—		Non-album singles
"Thank U" (among U^{3})	1999	39	—	JPN: 14,000	Star
"Golden Era" (Keiko Fuji with Cubic U)	1999	—	—		Non-album single
"Kodomotachi no Uta ga Kikoeru" (子供たちの歌が聞こえる; "I Can Hear the Children's Song") (among U^{3})	2002	—	—		Star
"Do You" (Ne-Yo featuring Utada)	2007	—	—		Ne-Yo: The Collection
"Anata ga Matteru" (The Back Horn featuring Hikaru Utada)	2017	21	40	JPN: 4,000	Non-album single
"Lonely One" (Nariaki Obukuro featuring Hikaru Utada)	2018	—	—		Bunriha no Natsu
"The Sun & Moon in Tokyo" (Ringo Sheena featuring Hikaru Utada)	2019	—	43		Apple of Universal Gravity
"Stay with Me" (Sam Smith featuring Hikaru Utada)	2024	—	—		In the Lonely Hour: 10 Year Anniversary Edition
"Home" (Charlie Puth featuring Hikaru Utada)	2026	— (Note: "Home" did not enter the Oricon Singles Chart, but peaked at number 17 on the Oricon Digital Singles Chart.)	16		Whatever's Clever!
"—" denotes a recording that did not chart.

== Promotional singles ==
List of promotional singles, with selected chart positions and certifications
Title	Year	Peak chart positions				Certifications	Album
Title	Year	JPN	JPN Cmb.	JPN Hot	JPN Adult	Certifications	Album
"I'll Be Stronger" (as Cubic U)	1997	—	—	—	—		Non-album single
"Close to You" (as Cubic U)	1998	—	—	—	—		Precious
"Fly Me to the Moon" (Note: Originally released as a commercial vinyl record of remixes in 2000, a new recording of the song was released digitally on June 27, 2007, to promote the film Evangelion: 1.0 You Are (Not) Alone.)	2000	16	—	—	—	RIAJ: Gold (rt.)	"Wait & See (Risk)" (single) / Evangelion: 1.0 You Are (Not) Alone Original Soundtrack
"Parody"	2001	—	—	—	—		Distance
"Distance"	2001	—	—	—	—	RIAJ: Gold (phy.)	Distance
"Play Ball" (プレイボール, Pureibōru)	2002	—	—	—	—		Deep River
"Deep River"	2002	—	—	—	—		Deep River
"Tokyo Nights" (東京NIGHTS, Tōkyō Naitsu)	2002	—	—	—	—		Deep River
"Fight the Blues"	2008	—	—	1	—		Heart Station
"Eternally (Drama Mix)"	2008	—	—	36	—	RIAJ: Gold (rt.); Gold (PC)	Non-album single
"Merry Christmas Mr. Lawrence - FYI" (as Utada)	2009	—	—	—	54		This Is the One
"Beautiful World (Planitb Acoustica Mix)"	2009	—	—	8	2	RIAJ: Platinum (dig.)	Single Collection Vol. 2
"Arashi no Megami" (嵐の女神; "Storm Goddess")	2010	—	—	—	—		Single Collection Vol. 2
"Can't Wait 'Til Christmas"	2010	—	—	2	3	RIAJ: Gold (rt.); Gold (PC)	Single Collection Vol. 2
"Show Me Love (Not a Dream)"	2010	—	—	37	—		Single Collection Vol. 2
"Nijikan Dake no Vacance" (featuring Ringo Sheena)	2016	—	—	23	—	RIAJ: Gold (phy.); Gold (dig.)	Fantôme
"Bōkyaku" (忘却; "Forgotten") (with KOHH)	2017	—	—	—	—		Fantôme
"Marunouchi Sadistic" (Hikaru Utada & Nariaki Obukuro)	2018	—	—	44	—		Adam to Eve no Ringo
"Too Proud (L1 Remix)" (featuring XZT, Suboi EK)	2018	—	—	65	—		Hatsukoi
"Shōnen Jidai" (少年時代; "Boyhood")	2019	—	—	— (Note: Charted at 75 on the Download Songs chart.)	—		Inoue Yosui Tribute
"Beautiful World (Da Capo Ver.)"	2021	—	32	40	—		One Last Kiss
"Find Love"	2021	—	—	— (Note: "Find Love" did not enter the Billboard Japan Hot 100 Chart, but peaked at number 73 on the Billboard Japan Top Download Songs Chart.)	—		Bad Mode
"Bad Mode"	2022	—	40	23	—		Bad Mode
"—" denotes a recording that did not chart.

== Other appearances ==
List of non-studio album or guest appearances that feature Hikaru Utada
Title	Year	Album
"Blow My Whistle" (Hikaru Utada & Foxy Brown)	2001	Rush Hour 2 Soundtrack
"Promise "I Do" (Maki Ohguro featuring Hikaru Utada)	2001	O
"I Won't Last a Day Without You" (Ringo Sheena with Hikaru Utada)	2002	Utaite Myōri: Sono Ichi
"Kaze ga Fuiteru" (風が吹いてる; "The Wind Is Blowing") (Kuzu featuring Hikaru Utada)	2003	Kuzu Album
"Colors (Orchestra Version)"	2003	Beautiful Drivin' Classic: Wish
"I Love You" (Note: Originally performed during their Bohemian Summer 2000 tour. The audio is a remastered version from the performance featured on the DVD.)	2004	Blue: A Tribute to Yutaka Ozaki
"By Your Side" (Timbaland - Kiley Dean - Utada)	2004	Unity: The Official Athens 2004 Olympic Games Album
"London City" (Devlin featuring Hikaru Utada)	2010	Bud, Sweat and Beers
"Sanctuary" (French Montana featuring Hikaru Utada)	2010	Mac & Cheese 3
"Sanctuary Part II" (French Montana featuring Hikaru Utada)	2016	Wave Gods
"Final Distance (13 Years Distance Mix)" (Ai and Hikaru Utada)	2016	The Feat. Best
