= Hikaru Utada Laughter in the Dark Tour 2018 =

2018 concert tour by Hikaru Utada

- Tour by Hikaru Utada
- Promotional poster
- Associated album: Hatsukoi
- Start date: November 6, 2018
- End date: December 9, 2018
- No. of shows: 13
- Website: hikaruutadatour2018.jp

Hikaru Utada concert chronology
- Wild Life (2010); Hikaru Utada Laughter in the Dark Tour 2018 (2018); Science Fiction (2024)

Hikaru Utada Laughter in the Dark Tour 2018 was Japanese-American singer-songwriter Hikaru Utada's fourth Japanese tour. The 13-date sold-out tour began in Yokohama and ended in Chiba. It was Utada's first concert in Japan in 8 years since Wild Life, and first concert tour in the country in 12 years since Utada United 2006. Initially, the concert tour was scheduled with 12 regular dates in arenas, but one extra concert, sponsored by Suntory, was later scheduled for November 17.

== Recordings and release ==
The tour was officially broadcast on the Japanese TV channels BS Sky Perfect!, in January 2019, and on M-ON, in March 2019, along with a documentary showing the behind the scenes of the tour and production process.

Two songs were recorded with 6K 180 degrees cameras for PlayStation VR, Hikari and Chikai. They were both released worldwide on PlayStation VR on January 18, 2019, the same day the single Face My Fears was released.

An official release of the full tour concert with backstage documentary was released in 3 disc set in Blu-ray and DVD formats on June 26, 2019, including an extra disc with music videos of Anata, Forevermore and Hatsukoi, along M-ON documentaries of behind the scenes. The concert is currently available on iTunes for digital download, Netflix for streaming and Sky Perfect TV for Pay per view.

== Set list ==
1. "Anata"
2. "Michi"
3. "Traveling"
4. "Colors"
5. "Prisoner of Love"
6. "Kiss & Cry" (with samples of "Can You Keep a Secret?")
7. "Sakura Drops"
8. "Hikari"
9. "Tomodachi"
10. "Too Proud"
11. "Chikai"
12. "Manatsu no Tooriame"
13. "Hanataba o Kimi ni"
14. "Forevermore"
15. "First Love"
16. "Hatsukoi"
17. "Play a Love Song"
18. "Ore no Kanojo"
19. "Automatic"
20. "Goodbye Happiness"

== Shows ==
Tour dates for Hikaru Utada Laughter in the Dark Tour 2018.

List of concerts
Date	City	Country	Venue	Attendance
November 6, 2018	Yokohama	Japan	Yokohama Arena	140,000
November 7, 2018	Yokohama	Japan	Yokohama Arena	140,000
November 14, 2018	Fukuoka	Japan	Marine Messe Fukuoka	140,000
November 15, 2018	Fukuoka	Japan	Marine Messe Fukuoka	140,000
November 17, 2018	Hoki	Japan	Torigin Culture Hall	140,000
November 22, 2018	Nagoya	Japan	Nippon Gaishi Hall	140,000
November 23, 2018	Nagoya	Japan	Nippon Gaishi Hall	140,000
November 28, 2018	Osaka	Japan	Osaka-jō Hall	140,000
November 29, 2018	Osaka	Japan	Osaka-jō Hall	140,000
December 4, 2018	Saitama	Japan	Saitama Super Arena	140,000
December 5, 2018	Saitama	Japan	Saitama Super Arena	140,000
December 8, 2018	Chiba	Japan	Makuhari Messe	140,000
December 9, 2018	Chiba	Japan	Makuhari Messe	140,000
Total				140,000
