= 40Dai-Wa-Iroiro =

Hikaru Utada birthday event

40代はいろいろ -Live from Metropolis Studios-

Single album by Hikaru Utada
- Released: February 17, 2023
- Venue: Metropolis Studios
- Length: 7:35
- Label: Sony Music Labels

40Dai-Wa-Iroiro (40代ーはー色々; 40s Are Various) was a live stream event celebrating the fortieth birthday of Japanese American singer-songwriter Hikaru Utada at Metropolis Studios in London, England on January 19, 2023.

A month later, on February 17, Utada released archival footage of the live stream event online, as well as the single, 40代はいろいろ -Live from Metropolis Studios-, featuring its live renditions of "First Love" and "Kimi ni Muchū" (君に夢中; "Crazy About You").

== Event ==
Every tenth birthday of theirs, Utada has hosted a special event. In 2003, for their twentieth birthday, they hosted "20dai wa Ikeike!" ("20代はイケイケ!"; "Your 20s Are Funky!"), which was Japan's largest live streaming event ever at the time. Later, in their thirties, they hosted "30dai wa Hodohodo" ("30代はほどほど"; "Your 30s Are Moderate"), which was a virtual reality event. As such, it was announced in 2022 that a special event would happen for their fortieth in 2023.

The live stream event began on January 19, 2023, taking place at Metropolis Studios in London, England; its production was aided by Sony's 360 Reality Audio technology. The live stream event opened with a DJ set from DJ Yanatake featuring some of Utada's most popular songs such as "Simple and Clean," "Automatic," and "Heart Station," among many others, after which Utada answered questions from their fans. Actors Yuriko Yoshitaka and Takeru Satoh then made surprise appearances. To conclude the event afterward, Utada performed their songs, "First Love" and "Kimi ni Muchū," and covered "Me Porto Bonito" by Bad Bunny. (Utada's live version of "Kimi ni Muchū" featured new lyrics in not just Japanese but also English and Italian.) Around 80,000 people viewed the live stream event.

Later, DJ Yanatake's opening mix was also uploaded to YouTube on February 3, and new photos of Utada, taken by Mibe Masahiro, were shown on Utada's website. On February 17, a director's cut of the live stream event was uploaded to YouTube, and a single with the live versions of "First Love" and "Kimi ni Muchū" was released on streaming platforms. Additionally, on March 23, a video with behind-the-scenes footage, and an interview with sound engineer Steve Fitzmaurice, was uploaded to YouTube, and starting on March 31, Sony stores across Japan hosted three-dimensional listening events for the single.

== Single ==
All tracks are written by Hikaru Utada.

40代はいろいろ -Live from Metropolis Studios-
No.	Title	Length
1.	"First Love - Live 2023"	3:58
2.	"Rule (君の夢中) - Live 2023"	3:36
Total length:		7:35
