= Innocent Love (TV series) =

Japanese television series

- Written by: Taeko Asano
- Starring: Maki Horikita; Yūjin Kitagawa; Yuu Kashii; Seiji Fukushi; Hiroki Narimiya; Yuki Uchida; Takashi Naitō; Kōsuke Toyohara; Mitsuru Hirata
- Opening theme: Eternally -Drama Mix- by Hikaru Utada
- Composer: Yugo Kanno
- Country of origin: Japan
- Original language: Japanese
- No. of seasons: 1
- No. of episodes: 10

Production
- Producer: Toshiyuki Nakano
- Running time: 54 minutes
- Production company: Fuji Television

Original release
- Network: FNS (Fuji TV)
- Release: 20 October – 22 December 2008

Innocent Love (イノセント・ラヴ) is a Japanese television drama series that aired on Fuji TV from 20 October to 22 December 2008. Maki Horikita played the lead role as Kanon Akiyama. The screenwriter is Taeko Asano, who wrote the screenplay for Last Friends. The first episode received the viewership rating of 16.9% in Kantō region.

== Cast ==
- Maki Horikita as Kanon Akiyama
- Yūjin Kitagawa as Junya Nagasaki
- Yuu Kashii as Mizuki Sakurai
- Seiji Fukushi as Yōji Akiyama
- Hiroki Narimiya as Subaru Segawa
- Yuki Uchida as Kiyoka Tōno
- Takashi Naitō as a priest
- Kōsuke Toyohara as Jirō Ikeda
- Mitsuru Hirata as Seitarō Akiyama

Preceded by Taiyo to Umi no Kyoshitsu; 21 July 2008 - 22 September 2008	Fuji TV Getsuku Drama; Mondays 21:00 - 21:54 (JST)	Succeeded by Voice: Inochi Naki Mono no Koe (12 January 2009 - 23 March 2009)
