= Laughter in the Dark =

Laughter in the Dark may refer to:

- Laughter in the Dark (novel), a 1936 novel by Vladimir Nabokov
- Laughter in the Dark (film), a 1969 film based on the novel
- Hikaru Utada Laughter in the Dark Tour 2018, a 2018 concert tour by singer Hikaru Utada
