= First Love (2022 TV series) =

Japanese television series

- Promotional poster
- Genre: Romance
- Inspired by: "First Love", "Hatsukoi" by Hikaru Utada
- Screenplay by: Yuri Kanchiku
- Directed by: Yuri Kanchiku
- Starring: Hikari Mitsushima; Takeru Satoh
- Country of origin: Japan
- Original language: Japanese
- No. of episodes: 9

Production
- Production companies: C&I Entertainment

Original release
- Network: Netflix
- Release: November 24, 2022

First Love (Japanese: First Love 初恋, Hepburn: First Love Hatsukoi) is a Japanese television series starring Hikari Mitsushima and Takeru Satoh, released by Netflix on 24 November 2022. The series and its Japanese title were inspired by two Hikaru Utada songs, "First Love" and "Hatsukoi".

== Plot ==
The plot revolves around a man and a woman who met in the late 1990s as teenagers and grew up together in the early 2000s. After 15 years, they meet again and try to rekindle their first love through memories. Yae wanted to be a flight attendant but suffered an accident. Harumichi served as a pilot in the JASDF but his life took a different path.

== Cast ==
- Hikari Mitsushima as Yae Noguchi
  - Rikako Yagi as young Yae
- Takeru Satoh as Harumichi Namiki
  - Taisei Kido as young Harumichi
- Kaho as Tsunemi Arikawa
- Minami as Yū Namiki
  - Itsuki Nagasawa as young Yū
- Akiyoshi Nakao as Bonji Kawano
  - Jiei Wakabayashi as young Bonji
- Towa Araki as Tsuzuru Kosaka
- Aoi Yamada as Uta Komori
- Gaku Hamada as Ōtaro

== Episodes ==
No.	Title	Original release date
1	"When the Lilacs Bloom"; Transliteration: "Rira no Hana Sakukoro" (Japanese: リラの花咲く頃)	November 24, 2022
Yae Noguchi is a single mother working as the only female taxi driver in her company, Keisei Transportation. This catches the attention of her co-worker Outaro, who made several attempts to ask her out on a date, but is unsuccessful. Her teenage son Tsuzuru is an aspiring musician who lives with his father, as the two are divorced and only visits Yae once a week. Harumichi Namiki is a security guard of the Northern Lights Building, who has a troubling relationship with his fiancée, Tsunemi. While hanging out with his sister Yu (who is deaf), and her daughter Airu, Yu notices that Harumichi's passcode for his smartphone is "1209", implying to mean December 9th - Yae's birthday, to which Harumuchi denies as he and Yae have not seen each other in years. Later as he rides a taxi, he sees Yae driving by, but she does not notice him. In a flashback to the late 1990s, Yae and Harumichi are schoolmates in high school, with the former being quite popular and the latter secretly having a liking to her. The two would bump into each other on several occasions, one being Harumichi renting an adult film at a video store where Yae works. After rejecting another boy who asks her out, Yae asks Harumichi what his favorite food is, which he replies is Napolitan. Upon learning from his family that Yae's question is code for her confessing she likes him, Harumichi rushes to meet her in the snowy blizzard on December 9th, hugs her and asks the same question, and the two confess each other's feelings.
2	"Your Voice"; Transliteration: "Kimi no Koe" (Japanese: きみの声)	November 24, 2022
Harumichi uses a two-way radio to intercept signals from various taxi drivers, hoping one of them is Yae's, and constantly listens on a daily basis. One night he finally receives Yae's signal. Taking Tsuzuru's advice, Yae accepts Outaro's invitation to a date, unaware that Harumichi came by at Keisei Transportation to see her. The date doesn't turn out well. Outaro asks why Yae took the job as a taxi driver and comments that she may have been influenced by something and mentions the movie Titanic, which Yae quickly denies having seen the film herself. Harumichi comes home to Tsunemi, who is watching the movie, which springs up memories of him and Yae when the film came out in Japan. While on patrol, Harumichi encounters Tsuzuru, who waits outside for a girl named Uta. Uta dances at the Northern Lights Building and posts videos on Instagram. Harumichi advises him to come back Saturday, where Uta would likely appear. When the day comes, Tsuzuru and Uta meet and the two connect. On his weekly visit to Yae (which is also the day Uta will return to dance), Tsuzuru tells of his encounter with his mother, who encourages him to go see her. When Yae goes to pick up her son, she encounters Harumichi and greets him, but does not recognize him, to the latter's surprise, and he sheds a tear when they left.
3	"Napolitan"; Transliteration: "Naporitan" (Japanese: ナポリタン)	November 24, 2022
Tsuzuru visits Uta at the bar where she works and presents his music to her peers, which they enjoy. A frantic Tsuzuru later seeks Harumichi for advice, the latter commenting the former is showing signs of 'first love'. When Harumichi then asks how Yae is doing, Tsuzuru explains his relationship with his parents. Yae picks up Uta and drives her to the airport where she plans to audition for a dance company in Tel Aviv, Israel. Later, when Yae texts her son that she's at the public laundromat, Harumichi rushes there to find her sleeping on a bench. Yae wakes up and the two return to her apartment where he repairs her broken washing machine. They then have dinner where Yae asks Harumichi his favorite food, though the original context of the question has since been lost. In 2001, Yae moves to Tokyo to attend college while Harumichi joins the Japan Air Self-Defense Force to be a fighter pilot and trains in Hōfu Air Field in Yamaguchi Prefecture. Despite this, the two maintain contact with each other. Eight months later, Harumichi visits Yae and the two eat out at an Italian restaurant when two of Yae's college friends, Nanako and Machida, come in. The two make fun of and criticize Harumichi for being part of the Self-Defense Force. Later, Machida belittles Harumichi's relationship with Yae and reveals her going to Canada as a foreign exchange student. Angry that Yae did not tell him herself, he leaves. When Harumichi calls Yae to apologize, she is struck by a vehicle and is knocked unconscious. The accident causes her to suffer from retrograde amnesia, thus losing her memory of her ever being with Harumichi.
4	"Space Oddity"	November 24, 2022
Yae and Harumichi make constant contact with each other and she invites him to a restaurant that serves Napolitan, which he accepts. Later, Harumichi jogs at a local park where he sees a poster of Mars being the closest it has been to be observable from Earth. Yae is also at the park, about to see Mars from the observatory, when she and Harumichi bump into one another. After looking at Mars and gazing in the night sky, Yae turns down Harumichi's offer for a taxi ride and walks to a nearby vending machine. Harumichi follows her and buys her a drink when Tsunemi arrives. One year after Yae's accident, she returns to her childhood home in Hokkaido to help regain some of her lost memories. But even with scrapbooks of her high school years and a visit from her best friend Nonko, she in unable to remember, much to her dismay. Yae's mother receives a letter from Harumichi meant for Yae, who returned to the Self-Defense Force, but chooses to hide it from her daughter. When Yae returns home, she discusses with her mother with much enthusiasm about the doctor assigned to her progress, Yukihito Kosaka (later to be Tsuzuru's father). Harumichi graduates from training as a pilot and visits Yae's home in Hokkaido, where her mother returns all of Harumichi's letters to him and explains that Yae is engaged with Yukihito and is pregnant. Heartbroken, Harumichi burns the letters he has written for her.
5	"Talk In Sign Language"	November 24, 2022
Tsunemi arrives and Harumichi introduces her to Yae, after the which the latter hurriedly leaves. The next day, Tsunemi sets up a date where she and Harumichi visit her parents, forcing Harumichi to cancel his pre-planned date with Yae. Uta returns from Israel and gives a performance at an event where Tsuzuru comes to watch. The two then share a drink together and Tsuzuru opens up on how he wishes his father could appreciate his music, but instead pushes him to pursue a medical career. Uta gives him words of encouragement. Later as Tsuzuru talks more about his musical aspirations, Uta suddenly goes to hang out with another man, causing Tsuzuru to tearfully run away. Uta posts photos of her with the other man on her Instagram, which further upsets Tsuzuru. Yae takes in a man who asks her to drive to the Northern Lights Building and upon arrival, hurriedly enters the building, leaving his smartphone behind. Yae follows and as she climbs the stairs, the man runs down attempting to escape with stolen documents and shoves her away. Harumichi catches her and breaks her fall, but is unconscious, while the thief is caught by authorities. Yu and Airu visit Harumichi at the hospital where they meet Yae. Yae instinctively communicates with Yu in sign language much to her own amazement. In the mid-2000s, Harumichi switches careers from being a fighter pilot to piloting cargo planes. Yu marries Bonji, a childhood friend of her and Harumichi's. At the reception, Harumichi apologizes to Yu for not being able to help her when she nearly drowned at the rapids as children, causing her deafness. Back in high school, Harumichi answers in the Future Career Questionnaire that he wishes to join the Japan Air Self-Defense Force because Yae finds jet planes cool. She visits Harumichi's family and communicates with Yu in sign language, to everyone's surprise.
6	"The Sixth Sense"	November 24, 2022
Harumichi returns to work and uses his condition to slack off while ordering his co-worker around. The latter then asks about Yae and why Harumichi didn't tell her the truth of their relationship, to which Harumichi shuts it down. Yae volunteers to be Harumichi's personal driver until he fully recovers, and drives him to Tsunemi's home. Harumichi asks for a flashlight and magnet, which Yae provides, and recalls the time Yae carried them back in high school when they went out on a picnic before changing their plan to see Yae's father instead, who frequently flies abroad. This inspires Yae to secretly tell Harumichi her dream of being a flight attendant. After their meeting, Yae reveals her father left her and her mother for another woman and had a child. On Yae's last day of being Harumichi's personal driver, he invites her to the top of Mount Tengu where they ask each other about their high school lives. Yae confesses she doesn't remember much but feels she lost something important in her life. The two then share a kiss. In 2007, Yae raises Tsuzuru at Yukihito's home, but is stressed over her husband and family's high-life style, and little regard of her. Yae also finds evidence of Yukihito having an affair.
7	"The Order of Dreams"; Transliteration: "Yume no ato Saki" (Japanese: 夢のあとさき)	November 24, 2022
Yae is lost in thought after sharing a kiss with Harumichi. Tsunemi rushes her wedding plans with Harumichi as she suspects of losing him to Yae. After her shift ended late evening, Harumichi picks up Yae at Keisei Transportation and they talk and walk outside together until dawn. Tsuzuru remains upset over losing Uta and deletes all of his music works. Back in 2007, Harumichi is deployed to Iraq as part of the country's Japanese Iraq Reconstruction and Support Group. Yae divorces Yukihito after not only her mother is not invited to her husband's hospital party, but is deemed as an outcast. Two years later, Yae works two jobs to help raise Tsuzuru, but at the cost of not spending enough time with him as well as her health. After getting fired from her factory job over taking a sick leave for her son, Yae is forced to accept Yukihito's offer of taking full custody of Tsuzuru. Yae then leaves Hokkaido and at the airport, Harumichi, who just returned from Iraq, sees her. Harumichi rushes to her, but is too late as she leaves to help a lost child. A year passes and Harumichi is assigned to Tsunemi Arikawa as his therapist after years of serving the JASDF and going to abroad to nations of conflict. Harumichi asks her of a way to restore lost memories and Tsunemi suggests the use of involuntary memory and the five senses (sight, smell, touch, taste, and hearing) to remember.
8	"The Proust Effect On A Certain Afternoon"; Transliteration: "Aru Gogo no Purūsuto Kōka" (Japanese: 或る午後のプルースト効果)	November 24, 2022
Back in 2010, Harumichi finishes his required therapy sessions with Tsunemi, after which he asks her out on date, which is the start of them becoming a couple. A year passes and Harumichi prepares to leave for Hokkaido when the 2011 Tōhoku earthquake and tsunami happened. Harumichi goes back to Tsunemi to find her safe, they embrace, and he commits to a serious relationship with her. He then returns to the JASDF to partake in the relief efforts. Yae bids farewell to her mother before moving to Sapporo to work as a taxi driver. Another year passes and Harumichi and Tsunemi also move to Sapporo. During their road trip together, their vehicle breaks down and has to be towed and serviced by Bonji, who asks about the couple's relationship. Bonji suspects Harumichi still has feelings for Yae, which he denies. Tsunemi meets Yu, who tells her about Harumichi's first love. While visiting the Namiki residence, Tsunemi looks over Harumichi's high school photos and connects him to Yae. Outaro makes one final attempt to ask Yae out, which she declines. Yae provides him words of encouragement, and in return, he advises her of expressing her true feelings. Tsuzuru visits Harumichi and, deducing what has happened between him and Uta, converses with him on their love lives. Harumichi then breaks up with Tsunemi. Yae asks Harumichi out on a date and he accepts, but when the day comes, Harumichi calls her saying he is leaving Japan to be a commercial pilot overseas. Yae confesses her feelings to him and the two end their conversation. While packing his belongings, Harumichi gives Tsuzuru a CD player as a parting gift. While visiting Yae, she and Tsuzuru listen to the CD player containing Hikaru Utada's "First Love" - the song Yae and Harumichi listened to in high school when they shared their first kiss. Yae cries as she finally remembers Harumichi. The fifth sense of hearing seems to be the trigger for this remembrance.
9	"Hatsukoi" (Japanese: 初恋)	November 24, 2022
In 1997, Yae leaves by train for Kitami for a practice high school entrance exam and passes. While looking at her novel at home, she notices a train ticket bookmarked between the pages. Yae traces back the ticket to Appaushi station and waits for the person who gave her the ticket to thank him. When no one came, she writes "thank you" on the chalkboard before returning home. With her memories restored, in 2019 Yae returns to Hokkaido to dig up a time capsule from 2001 that she and Harumichi buried with the plan to excavate in 2011. Yae looks at all the items that remind her of Harumichi, among them the bookmarked train ticket, and a letter encased in a cigarette packet. In the packet Yae discovers an updated letter that Harumichi inserted in the meantime. While studying, Tsuzuru could not get his mind off Uta, which inspires him to compose a new musical piece. When Yae returns to work, she finds Uta playing Mahjong among the other taxi drivers. Later, Uta tells Yae she is going back to Tel Aviv to be part of a world tour with the dance company. After Tsuzuru completes the musical piece, he and Yae drive to the airport during which Yae hands over Uta's gift to Tsuzuru - a pair of shades. Tsuzuru makes it to the airport and confesses his feelings to Uta and giving her his latest composition. Uta cries and gives him a kiss, then informs him she broke off with the other man after he cheated on her. Yae decides to leave Japan to follow Harumichi and asks for paid time-off at Keisei Transportation. When her employer denies her request, her peers rally to her defense and her time off is granted. However, the COVID-19 pandemic happened, thus hindering her chance to do so. Three years later, Tsuzuru is a successful music artist. Uta returns to Japan and reunites with him and informs him she's found Harumichi at Húsavík, Iceland. As Yae departs Japan for Iceland, she reads the letter inside the cigarette packet, revealing that Harumichi was a juvenile delinquent who frequently got into fights defending Yu from harassment due to her deafness, and was on the same train as her going to Kitami for the practice exam, and was the one who bookmarked her novel with his train ticket. Seeing her in the train and during the practice exams and believing they are fated together, Harumichi studies hard and successfully enters the same school as Yae. In Iceland, Yae reunites with Harumichi and the two kiss. Sometime later, Harumichi and Yae now work together living their dreams as a pilot and a flight attendant, respectively.

== Reception ==
Phil Harrison from The Guardian wrote that "it’s tasteful, idealised and at times, a little antiseptic: romance as designed by Marie Kondo". James Hadfield from The Japan Times described First Love as "luscious and spectacularly silly". Jonathon Wilson of Ready Steady Cut praised the acting, commenting that “the actors really sell all the ups and downs,” but also said that “its well-worn plot beats are strung out over a runtime much too spacious for them to fill.”

== Awards and nominations ==
Name of the award ceremony, year presented, category, nominee(s) of the award, and the result of the nomination
Award ceremony	Year	Category	Nominee / Work	Result	Ref.
Asia Contents Awards & Global OTT Awards	2023	Best Director	Yuri Kanchiku	Nominated	
Asia Contents Awards & Global OTT Awards	2023	Best Lead Actor	Takeru Satoh	Nominated	
Asia Contents Awards & Global OTT Awards	2023	Best Newcomer Actress	Yagi Rikako	Nominated	
