= Pappaparadise =

2026 single by Hikaru Utada

- Digital cover

Single by Hikaru Utada
- Language: Japanese; English
- A-side: "Pappaparadise" (featuring Hiroto Kōmoto)
- Released: May 6, 2026
- Length: 3:51
- Label: Epic Japan
- Songwriter: Hikaru Utada
- Producers: Henry Bowers-Broadbent; Hikaru Utada

Hikaru Utada singles chronology
"Home" (2026)	"Pappaparadise" (2026)

Alternative cover
- 7-inch vinyl cover

Music video
- "Pappaparadise" on YouTube "Pappaparadise feat. Hiroto Kohmoto" on YouTube

"Pappaparadise" (Japanese: パッパパラダイス; stylized in all uppercase) is a song recorded by Japanese-American singer-songwriter Hikaru Utada. Released as a digital single on May 6, 2026, via Epic Records Japan, "Pappaparadise" serves as the 14th ending theme song for the children's anime series Chibi Maruko-chan.

== Background and release ==
In March 2026, Hikaru Utada's staff shared the artist's new song "Pappaparadise" would serve as the new ending theme song for the children's anime series Chibi Maruko-chan. A TV edit of the song was later released on Utada's YouTube channel on March 29. On April 6, "Pappaparadise" served as a commercial tie-in song for the Coca-Cola Company's green tea brand Ayataka. The song was later aired on a radio program, Hikaru Utada's Très Bien Bohemian Special 2026, hosted by Utada.

The full version of "Pappapradise" was released as a digital single on May 6, 2026. A 7-inch vinyl of "Pappaparadise" is scheduled for release on June 24, 2026, coinciding with the remastered release of their two English studio albums, Exodus (2004) and This Is the One (2009).

== Promotion ==
A pre-add campaign was launched by Epic Japan from April 6, 2026, through May 5, 2026. Participants that pre-ordered or pre-added "Pappaparadise" were entered into a lottery, with 100 winners receiving an eraser.

== Music video ==
A music video for "Pappaparadise" premiered on Utada's YouTube channel on May 6. The video was directed by Tomokazu Yamada, who also directed the music video for Utada's "Mine or Yours". Cast members for the video include Min Tanaka, Tokio Emoto, Kiyohiko Shibukawa, and Junko Asano.

The video depicts Utada working a shift as a taxi driver as they convey and interact with various passengers.

== Track listing ==
- 7" Vinyl
1. "Pappaparadise" (featuring Hiroto Kōmoto) – 3:51
2. "Pappaparadise" – 3:51
- Digital download and streaming
1. "Pappaparadise" (featuring Hiroto Kōmoto) – 3:51
2. "Pappaparadise" – 3:51
3. "Pappaparadise" (instrumental) – 3:47

== Personnel ==
Studios

- Produced and recorded at RAK Studios, London
- Mixed at Pierce Rooms, Hammersmith
- Mastered at Sterling Sound, Edgewater, New Jersey

Personnel

- Hikaru Utada – lead vocals, songwriting, production, keyboard, horn arrangement, programming
- Henry Bowers-Broadbent – production, guitar, keyboard, horn arrangement, programming
- Ben Castle – alto saxophone
- Seye Adelekan – bass
- Isaac Kizito – drums, percussions
- Hinako Omori – organ, piano
- Graeme Blevins – tenor saxophone
- Alistair White – trombone
- Chris Storr – trumpet
- Tom Walsh – trumpet
- Steve Fitzmaurice – recording engineer, mixing
- Darren Heelis – recording engineer
- Tommy Bosustow – assistant recording engineer
- Filipe Melo – assistant recording engineer
- Randy Merrill – mastering

== Charts ==
=== Weekly charts ===
Weekly chart performance for "Pappaparadise"
Chart (2026)	Peak position
Japan (Oricon)	8
Japan Combined Singles (Oricon)	20
Japan Anime Singles (Oricon)	3
Japan Hot 100 (Billboard)	7
Japan Hot Animation (Billboard Japan)	2

Chart performance for "Pappaparadise" (featuring Hiroto Kōmoto)
Chart (2026)	Peak position
Japan Digital Singles (Oricon)	9
Japan Hot 100 (Billboard)	34

=== Monthly charts ===
Monthly chart performance for "Pappaparadise"
Chart (2026)	Position
Japan (Oricon)	29
Japan Anime Singles (Oricon)	9

== Release history ==
Release history and formats for "Pappaparadise"
Region	Date	Format(s)	Version	Label	Ref.
Various	May 6, 2026	Digital download; streaming	Original	Epic Japan	
Various	June 24, 2026	Digital download; streaming	Digital	Epic Japan	
Japan	June 24, 2026	7-inch single	Limited	Epic Japan	
