= Chikai (Hikaru Utada song) =

"Chikai / Don't Think Twice"

Single by Hikaru Utada

from the album Hatsukoi
- Language: Japanese
- Released: June 27, 2018
- Recorded: 2017
- Genre: J-pop; R&B; soul
- Length: 4:33
- Label: Epic; Sony Music Japan
- Songwriter: Hikaru Utada
- Producer: Hikaru Utada

Hikaru Utada singles chronology
"Hatsukoi" (2018)	"Chikai / Don't Think Twice" (2018)	"Face My Fears" (2019)

"Chikai" (誓い; lit. "Vow") is a song by Japanese-American singer-songwriter Hikaru Utada. Along with its English-language counterpart "Don't Think Twice", it serves as the ending theme song to the Square Enix video game, Kingdom Hearts III. "Chikai" first appeared on Utada's tenth studio album, Hatsukoi, and was also included on the setlist of their Laughter in the Dark Tour.

The song and the English version "Don't Think Twice" were released as a B-side of the single "Face My Fears" as a CD single on January 18, 2019, making it their first release on the format in eleven years since their 2008 single "Prisoner of Love". It is also their first release with original English songs since "This Is the One" in 2009.

== Promotion ==
On September 17, Utada performed "Chikai" live for the first time at Music Station Super FES 2018.

== Commercial performance ==
The song reached No. 8 in the Oricon download chart in the release week, despite the song not being released as a single officially to the date. In Billboard Japan, it peaked at No. 51 in Japan Hot 100 and No. 10 in the Download Songs chart. Internationally, it's the best-selling Utada single to the date. In the iTunes store, it peaked No. 39 in the North American, No. 3 in Chile, No. 7 in Colombia and charted in up to 10 countries.

== Charts ==
=== Weekly charts ===
Chart (2018)	Peak position
Billboard Japan Hot 100	51
Billboard Japan Download Songs	10
Oricon Digital Download Songs	8
US Billboard World Digital Song Sales	3

=== Sales and certifications ===
Chart	Amount
RIAJ digital downloads	20,343 (none)
