= Hatsukoi (Hikaru Utada album) =

Studio album by Hikaru Utada
- Released: June 27, 2018
- Recorded: 2017–2018
- Genres: J-pop; soul; R&B
- Length: 53:33
- Labels: Epic; Sony Music Japan
- Producer: Hikaru Utada

Hikaru Utada chronology
Fantôme (2016)	Hatsukoi (2018)	One Last Kiss (2021)

Singles from Hatsukoi
- 1. "Ōzora de Dakishimete" Released: July 10, 2017; 2. "Forevermore" Released: July 28, 2017; 3. "Anata" Released: December 8, 2017; 4. "Play a Love Song" Released: April 25, 2018; 5. "Hatsukoi" Released: May 30, 2018; 6. "Chikai" Released: June 27, 2018; 7. "Too Proud" Released: November 6, 2018

Hatsukoi (初恋, Hatsukoi; lit. "First Love") is the tenth studio album and seventh Japanese language album by Japanese-American recording artist Hikaru Utada. It was released on June 27, 2018, as their first album under Sony Music Japan sublabel Epic Records Japan. The release coincided with the commemoration of their 20th Anniversary as an artist in Japan. A national tour was announced to support the album in November 2018. The five previously released songs were confirmed in the album track list, for a total of twelve songs, including the title track "Hatsukoi" and the Kingdom Hearts III theme song "Chikai".

Hatsukoi debuted at the top spot of the Oricon Weekly Albums Chart with 203,787 copies sold on its first week or release. This was their overall tenth number-one album in the chart, but became their lowest first-week album sales since Utada Hikaru Single Collection Vol. 2 (2010). The album also debuted at the top spot of the Oricon Weekly Digital Albums Chart with 38,185 downloads, making it the highest first-week download record in the chart's history at the time.

A 2 LP vinyl version was released on November 7, 2018, at the request of their fans. The album was their first vinyl release in 16 years since Deep River. It has a different mastering by Chris Bellman of Bernie Grundman Mastering Hollywood and a limited serial number.

== Commercial performance ==
The album debuted at #1 in 6 different digital stores in Japan. Internationally, the album reached the peak in 7 different countries in the iTunes store, such as Finland, Taiwan, Hong Kong, Singapore, Macau and New Zealand. The album peaked at #4 in the United States, #5 in Canada, Mexico and Australia, #2 in Spain and Brazil, #9 in France and #11 in the United Kingdom. The album charted in top 10 in 22 different countries and charted for a total of 32 countries. In Japan, the album debuted at #1 in Oricon daily chart, selling more than 79,000 copies in the first day alone. It maintained the #1 spot on the second day selling more than 50,000 copies. According to Billboard Weekly, the album sold 204,000 copies in the first week physically and 38,000 digitally. Hatsukoi was the second best selling album by Sony Music globally in the second quarter of 2018.

== Promotion ==
Although the album did not receive any live performances prior to its release, it was set to spawn up to five singles prior to its release; of which all five reached the top 10 on the Billboard Japan Hot 100.

Two performances were performed on Japanese TV: On June 30, 2018, they performed "Play a Love Song", "Anata" and "Hatsukoi" at NHK's SONGS. On July 14, they performed "Hatsukoi" at TBS's Ongaku no Hi 2018. A TV documentary produced by NHK showing Utada's recording and producing process of the album was aired on June 16. In September 17, they performed "Chikai" live on Music Station Super FES 2018.

=== Singles ===
On July 10, 2017, the album's first single "Ōzora de Dakishimete" was released as a digital download. The song was used as a tie-in for Suntory Water campaign starring Utada, starting on June 10. The album's second single "Forevermore" was released as a digital download on July 28, along with its music video. The song was used as a tie-in for the TBS dorama Gomen, Aishiteru, their first single used in a drama of a commercial TV station since "Eternally - Drama Mix-" in 2008.

On December 8, 2017, the album's third single "Anata" was released as a digital download along with its corresponding promotional music video. The song was used as a tie-in for the movie Destiny: The Tale of Kamakura, and has been featured in a Sony campaign to promote a wireless headphone line, in which Utada personally made an appearance in.

On April 25, 2018, the album's fourth single, "Play a Love Song", was released as a digital download. It was being used as a tie-in for Tennensui Suntory Water. Shortly afterwards, the album's fifth single and title track "Hatsukoi" was released on May 30. The song has been used in the dorama Hana Nochi Hare ~Hanadan Next Season~ as an image song. It is the second song Utada delivers to the Hana Yori Dango drama series, after "Flavor of Life" in 2007.

"Chikai", along with its English-language counterpart "Don't Think Twice", served as the theme song to the Square Enix video game Kingdom Hearts III. The song and the English version "Don't Think Twice" was released as a B-side of the single "Face My Fears" as a CD single on January 18, 2019.

"Too Proud" was announced as a single on November 6, 2018. A remix of the song, called Too Proud (L1 Remix), was released as the A-side featuring Asian rappers XZT, Suboi and EK, each one singing their verses in their first language. It coincides with the first date of Hikaru Utada Laughter in the Dark Tour 2018.

=== Other songs ===
"Good Night" was featured on the soundtrack to the film Penguin Highway.

"Pakuchii no Uta" was used to promote a coriander-flavored cappuccino in Japan, for Tasty Japan, from BuzzFeed Japan.

"Shittosarerubeki Jinsei" was featured on the soundtrack to the film Parallel World Love Story.

== Track listing ==
All songs are written, composed and arranged by Hikaru Utada, except "Too Proud" (composed by Utada & Ellis Jevon and arranged by Utada & Nariaki Obukuro) and "Phakchi no Uta" (composed by Utada & Nariaki Obukuro). Strings arrangement by Simon Hale in songs 2, 3, 4, 5, 7, 10, 11 and 12.

No.	Title	Length
1.	"Play a Love Song"	4:12
2.	"Anata (あなた; You)"	4:37
3.	"Hatsukoi (初恋; First Love)"	4:41
4.	"Chikai (誓い; Oath)"	4:33
5.	"Forevermore"	4:54
6.	"Too Proud" (featuring Jevon)	4:41
7.	"Good Night"	4:22
8.	"Phakchi no Uta (パクチーの唄, Pakuchī no uta; Coriander Song)"	3:43
9.	"Nokoriga (残り香; Remaining Scent)"	3:38
10.	"Ōzora de Dakishimete (大空で抱きしめて; Embrace Me Under the Big Sky)"	4:34
11.	"Yūnagi (夕凪; Evening Calm)"	4:44
12.	"Shittosarerubeki Jinsei (嫉妬されるべき人生; A Life to Be Envied)"	4:46
Total length:		53:33

== Personnel ==
Credits adapted from the album's liner notes.

=== Vocals ===
- Hikaru Utada – lead vocals (all tracks)
- Jevon Ellis – featured vocals (track 6)
- Lawrence Johnson – choir director (track 1)
- Tarna Johnson, Charmain Elliot, Robyn Bailey-Reid, Patricia Scott, Carol Riley, Neresa Maye, Priscilla Danso, Jessica Mae Obioha – choir (track 1)

=== Instrumentation ===
- Hikaru Utada – brass arrangement (tracks 2, 8), strings arrangement (tracks 2–5, 7, 10–12)
- Chris Dave – percussion (tracks 1–2, 8, 12), additional drums (track 1), drums (tracks 2, 4–5, 8, 10–12)
- Jodi Milliner – synth bass, additional pads (track 1), electric bass (tracks 2, 5, 7–8, 10–12), Moog bass, Poly Moog (track 10)
- Ben Parker – electric guitar (tracks 2, 5, 7–8, 10–12), acoustic guitar (tracks 3, 7, 10), guitar atmosphere (track 4)
- Reuben James – acoustic piano (tracks 2, 8)
- Simon Clarke – alto saxophone (tracks 2, 8)
- David Liddell – trombone (tracks 2, 8)
- Ryan Quigley – trumpet (tracks 2, 8)
- Tim Sanders – tenor saxophone (tracks 2, 8)
- Simon Hale – string arrangement (tracks 2–5, 7, 10–12), conductor (tracks 2–7, 10–12), acoustic piano (track 4), Wurlitzer (tracks 5, 10), rhodes piano (track 5)
- Everton Nelson – strings leader (tracks 2–3, 7, 11–12)
- Vincent Taurelle – acoustic piano (tracks 3, 11)
- Joby Burgess – timpani (tracks 3, 11)
- Perry Montague-Mason – strings leader (tracks 4–5, 10)
- Sylvester Earl Harvin – drums (track 7)
- Phil Peskett – acoustic piano (track 12)
- Darren Heelis – juno bass (track 9)

=== Production ===
- Hikaru Utada – executive producer, production, songwriting (all tracks)
- Jevon Ellis – songwriting (track 6)
- Obukuro Nariaki – songwriting (track 8)
- Utada Sking Teruzane – executive producer
- Miyake Akira – executive producer

=== Technical ===
- Hikaru Utada – programming (tracks 1–2, 4–12)
- Jevon Ellis – recording (track 6)
- Steve Fitzmaurice – recording (tracks 1–8, 10–12), mixing (all tracks), additional drum programming (tracks 1–2, 4–5, 7–8, 10–11), additional engineering (track 9)
- Komori Masahito – vocal recording (all tracks), guitar recording (track 3)
- Bob Ludwig – mastering (all tracks)
- Darren Heelis – additional engineering (all tracks), additional drum programming (tracks 1–2, 4–12), recording (track 7), additional recording (tracks 6,12)
- Obukuro Nariaki – programming (track 6)

=== Artwork ===
- Machiguchi Hikari – art direction
- Takay – photography
- Ogawa Kyohei – styling
- Inagaki Ryoji – hair, make-up

== Charts ==
=== Weekly charts ===
Chart (2018)	Peak position
French Digital Albums (SNEP)	49
Japanese Albums (Oricon)	1
Japanese Digital Albums (Oricon)	1
Japanese Hot Albums (Billboard)	1
South Korean International Albums (Circle)	4
US World Albums (Billboard)	3
US Top Album Sales (Billboard)	77
US Top Current Albums (Billboard)	66

=== Monthly charts ===
Chart (2018)	Peak position
Japanese Albums (Oricon)	2

=== Year-end charts ===
Chart (2018)	Position
Japanese Albums (Oricon)	5
Japanese Digital Albums (Oricon)	3
Japanese Hot Albums (Billboard)	3
Japan Digital Albums (Billboard)	3
Chart (2019)	Position
Japan Hot Albums (Billboard)	76

== Sales and certifications ==
Region	Certification	Certified units/sales
Japan (RIAJ) CD	Platinum	375,505
Japan (RIAJ) Digital	Gold	100,000^{*}
^{*} Sales figures based on certification alone.
