= Time (Hikaru Utada song) =

2020 single by Hikaru Utada

Single by Hikaru Utada

from the album Bad Mode
- Language: Japanese, English
- Released: May 8, 2020
- Recorded: 2019
- Genre: J-pop; R&B
- Length: 4:57
- Label: Epic; Sony Music Japan
- Songwriter: Hikaru Utada
- Producers: Hikaru Utada, Nariaki Obukuro

Hikaru Utada singles chronology
"Face My Fears" (2019)	"Time" (2020)	"Darenimo Iwanai" (2020)

Music video
- "Time" on YouTube

"Time" is a song by Japanese-American singer-songwriter Hikaru Utada, released on May 8, 2020, by Epic Records Japan. It served as the theme song for the NTV drama Bishoku Tantei Akechi Goro. The song was certified Gold by RIAJ for selling more than 100,000 digital downloads, and receiving more than 50 million streams in Japan.

== Charts ==
=== Weekly charts ===
Chart (2020)	Peak position
Billboard Japan Hot 100	7
Billboard Download Songs	1
US Billboard World Digital Song Sales	16
Oricon Digital Download Songs	1
