= Forevermore (Hikaru Utada song) =

Single by Hikaru Utada

from the album Hatsukoi
- Released: July 28, 2017
- Recorded: 2017
- Genre: J-pop; R&B; jazz
- Length: 4:55
- Label: Epic; Sony Music Japan
- Songwriter: Hikaru Utada
- Producer: Hikaru Utada

Hikaru Utada singles chronology
"Ōzora de Dakishimete" (2017)	"Forevermore" (2017)	"Anata" (2017)

Music video
- "Forevermore" on YouTube

"Forevermore" is a song by Japanese-American singer-songwriter Hikaru Utada. It was released on July 28, 2017, by Epic Records, as the second single from their tenth studio album, Hatsukoi. The song was used as a tie-in for the TBS dorama Gomen, Aishiteru, their first single used in a drama of a commercial TV station since "Eternally (Drama Mix)" (2008). It features American drummer Chris Dave.

== Music video ==
A music video for the song was shot in London, directed by Jamie-James Medina. It features Utada dancing contemporary choreography from Fukiko Takase. The video debuted on Sony Music Japan's YouTube channel on July 28, restricted to Japan and Japanese TV stations, and was set to be made available for streaming worldwide on August 10. However, on August 8, it was announced that the full video would be released worldwide as a purchasable download via iTunes on August 16, while a shortened version was uploaded on YouTube a few days earlier, indicating that there would be no wide release of the full video for streaming. “Forevermore (Music Video Documentary Digest)”, showing the process of the video production, was uploaded onto their VEVO channel later for international audience.

== Commercial reception ==
"Forevermore" opened to strong digital sales. Although being on sale for only four days, it came in at #2 on Billboard Japan's download counts, which resulted in a #8 entry on the Hot 100, while it debuted at #55 on the Radio Songs chart. In its second week, it became the #1 download single of the week, while moving to #6 on the Hot 100, although the biggest boost came from increasing video views and airplay, as it moved to #9 on the Radio Songs chart. However, the next week, it dropped 14 places to #20, but recovered to position 16 the week after. "Forevermore" then continued its chart run mostly in the lowest regions of the top 30, until it rose to #19 in its eighth week, dated September 25. The next two weeks, it dropped significantly, first to #32 and then to #65, on the issue dated October 9, its last appearance on the Hot 100 chart. On that same date, Billboard Japan began to publish its full Download Songs chart, on which "Forevermore" made an appearance at #20.

== Track listing ==
All lyrics are written by Hikaru Utada; all music is composed by Hikaru Utada.

Digital version
No.	Title	Length
1.	"Forevermore"	4:55

== Charts ==
=== Weekly charts ===
Chart (2017)	Peak position
Billboard Japan Hot 100	6
Billboard Japan Radio Songs	9
US Billboard World Digital Song Sales	20

=== Certifications ===
Chart	Amount
RIAJ digital downloads	100,000 (Gold)

== Release history ==
Region	Date	Format
Worldwide	July 28, 2017	Digital download
