= Ōzora de Dakishimete =

Single by Hikaru Utada

from the album Hatsukoi
- Language: Japanese
- English title: "Embrace Me Under the Big Sky"
- Released: July 10, 2017
- Recorded: 2017
- Genre: J-pop; R&B
- Length: 4:37
- Label: Epic; Sony Music Japan
- Songwriter: Hikaru Utada
- Producer: Hikaru Utada

Hikaru Utada singles chronology
"Michi" (2016)	"Ōzora de Dakishimete" (2017)	"Forevermore" (2017)

"Ōzora de Dakishimete" (大空で抱きしめて; lit. "Embrace Me Under the Big Sky") is a song by Japanese-American singer-songwriter Hikaru Utada. It is their first single under the label Epic Records Japan, from their tenth studio album, Hatsukoi. The song is being used as a tie-in for Suntory Water campaign starring Utada, starting on June 10, and was released as a digital download on July 10.

== Commercial performance ==
The song debuted at #1 in the Japanese iTunes Store and those of six other countries. In Japan, it achieved #1 position across eight different musical download services. On the issue dated July 24, "Ōzora de Dakishimete" debuted at #3 on the Billboard Japan Hot 100, while coming in at #5 on the Radio Songs chart and #1 in digital downloads. In its second week, the song fell 16 places to #19 on the Hot 100, while improving one position to #4 on the Radio Songs chart. In its third week, it fell to #37 on the Hot 100, while also dropping 13 places to #17 on the Radio Songs chart. After four weeks, the song fell off the Hot 100 and Radio Songs chart.

== Track listing ==
All lyrics are written by Hikaru Utada; all music is composed by Hikaru Utada.

Digital version
No.	Title	Length
1.	"Ōzora de Dakishimete (大空で抱きしめて)"	4:37

== Release history ==
Region	Date	Format
Worldwide	July 10, 2017	Digital download

== Charts ==
=== Weekly charts ===
Chart	Peak position
Billboard Japan Hot 100	3
Billboard Japan Radio Songs	4
US Billboard World Digital Song Sales	21

=== Certifications ===
Chart	Amount
RIAJ digital downloads	100,000 (Gold)
