= Hikaru Utada =

Japanese-American singer (born 1983)

Hikaru Utada 宇多田ヒカル
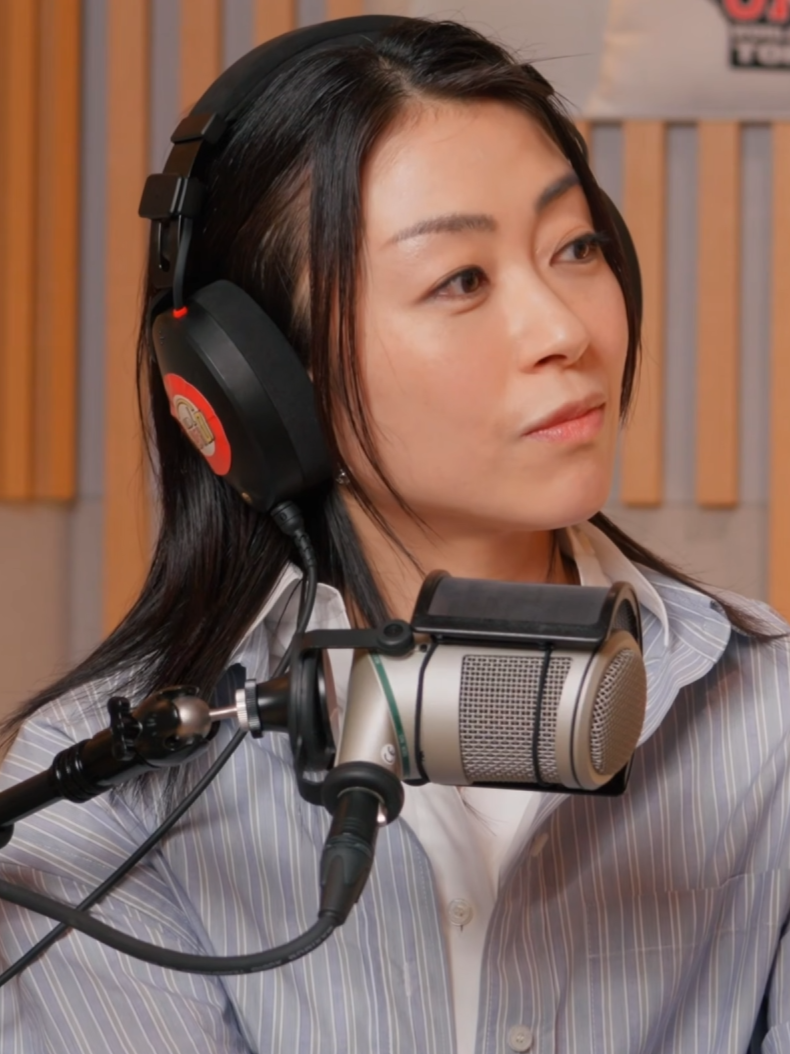
- Utada in 2026

Background information
- Also known as: Utada; Hikki; Cubic U
- Born: Hikaru Utada (宇多田光); January 19, 1983 (age 43); New York City, U.S.
- Origin: Tokyo, Japan
- Genres: J-pop; R&B; dance-pop; alt pop; pop rock
- Occupations: Singer; songwriter; record producer
- Works: Albums; singles
- Years active: 1996–present
- Labels: Eastworld; Virgin; Island; Mercury; Epic
- Spouse: Kazuaki Kiriya (m. 2002; div. 2007)
- Awards: Full list
- Website: utadahikaru.jp

Hikaru Utada (宇多田ヒカル, Utada Hikaru; born January 19, 1983), also known mononymously as Utada, is a Japanese-American singer, songwriter, and record producer. They (Note: Utada uses they/them and she/her pronouns while using English. This article uses they/them for consistency.) are considered to be one of the most influential and best-selling musical artists in Japan. They are perhaps best known by international audiences for writing and performing four theme-songs to Square Enix and Disney's Kingdom Hearts video game series: "Simple and Clean", "Sanctuary", "Don't Think Twice", and "Face My Fears" (with Skrillex).

Utada was born in New York City to Japanese parents, record producer Teruzane Utada and enka singer Keiko Fuji. They began to write songs at an early age and often traveled to Tokyo as a result of their father's job. Adopting the stage name Cubic U, they signed with Toshiba-EMI to release their English-language debut album, Precious (1998). Released the following year, their second album and Japanese-language debut, First Love (1999) is considered one of the reason for the popularization of American R&B and dance-pop in Japanese music; it was a commercial success, becoming Japan's best-selling album of all time. Its singles "Automatic", "Time Will Tell", and "Movin' On Without You" were commercially successful, while the album sold two million units in its first week in Japan, topped the Oricon chart for six non-consecutive weeks, and sold six million more units throughout the rest of 1999.

Utada's third album Distance was released in early 2001 and spawned their biggest singles—"Addicted to You", "Wait & See (Risk)" and "Can You Keep a Secret?" — each of which received multi-platinum certifications in Japan and other countries; it broke several sales records after three million copies were sold in its first week, instantly becoming Japan's fastest-selling album. Their fourth album, Deep River (2002)—backed by chart-topping singles such as "Traveling", "Hikari" and "Sakura Drops"—incorporated elements of pop folk, and became one of Japan's top-selling records of all time. Their subsequent albums, Exodus (2004), Ultra Blue (2006) and Heart Station (2008), also sold millions of copies. After a prolonged hiatus, Utada released the acoustic-driven albums Fantôme (2016) and Hatsukoi (2018), which reached number one on the Oricon albums chart. They topped the charts again with 2022's Bad Mode, their first Japanese/English album.

By the end of the 2000s, Utada was deemed "the most influential artist of the decade" in the Japanese music landscape by The Japan Times. They are one of Japan's top-selling recording artists of all time with over 40 million records sold. Twelve of their singles have reached number one on the Oricon Singles Chart, while ten albums have become chart-toppers. Six of their full-length releases are among Japan's highest-selling albums, including First Love, Distance and Deep River, which are among the top ten best-selling records of Japan's music history. In 2021, Utada became one of the first Japanese public figures to come out as non-binary.

== Biography ==
=== Early life and beginnings ===
Hikaru Utada was born on January 19, 1983 in New York City to Japanese parents. Their mother Keiko Fuji was an enka singer, while their father Teruzane Utada is a record producer. They grew up in the Upper East Side, New York and moved to Tokyo, Japan at age 11 due to their parents' work. At the age of 10, Utada began to write music and lyrics. Utada attended Columbia University in New York City starting in 2001, but dropped out after less than a year.

Utada made recordings with their mother, releasing songs under a band named "U3." In 1996 they started a solo project under the name Cubic U. The first Cubic U single, "I'll Be Stronger", was released as a limited pressing in Japan in 1996. The next year, Utada released "Close to You", a cover of The Carpenters. It was later included on Cubic U's debut album, Precious.

=== 1998–2003: Japanese debut, First Love, Distance, and Deep River ===
Utada moved to Tokyo in the summer of 1998 and attended Seisen International School, and later the American School in Japan, while continuing to record on a contract with Toshiba-EMI. Early success came from Japanese FM radio. They were at the forefront of a new wave of singer-songwriters in Japan, branching out from the previously dominant idol singers. Leading up to the release of their debut album First Love they released two successful million-selling singles: "Movin' On Without You" and "Automatic/Time Will Tell". The latter sold over two million copies. Backed by these singles, First Love went on to sell over 8 million units in Japan alone (with an additional 9,91 million overseas, bringing it to a sum of at least 18 million units), becoming the highest selling album in Japan's recent history. The album yielded the single "First Love", which peaked at the number 2 spot. By the end of the year, Utada was ranked 5th on Japanese radio station Tokio Hot 100 Airplay's Top 100 Artists of the 20th Century by the station and its listeners.

After a two-year break, Utada released the follow-up album Distance, garnering first-week sales of 3 million units. On the strength of its singles — "Addicted to You", "Wait & See (Risk)", "For You", "Time Limit", and "Can You Keep a Secret?" — Distance became the best-selling album of the year, with 4.47 million copies sold in Japan alone. Additionally, "Addicted to You" became their best-selling single, moving a million copies in its first week; the highest first week sales for a female solo artist. "Wait & See: Risk" and "Can You Keep a Secret?" also were later ranked at number 6 and number 10 respectively on Oricon's list of 10 best-selling singles from January 1, 1999, to April 24, 2006.

A manga biography titled Utada Hikaru: The Pure Soul, illustrated by Ari Obana, was published by Sōmasha on July 1, 2001. "Final Distance", a track written for and dedicated to Rena Yamashita, was released on July 25. It peaked at number two on the Oricon charts. On July 31, "Blow My Whistle" was released as a part of the soundtrack for Rush Hour 2. The song was a collaboration with American rapper Foxy Brown, and was written by Utada alongside producers Pharrell Williams and Chad Hugo. It peaked at number 11 on the Billboard 200 and number 1 on the Top Soundtracks.

Leading up to their third album, Deep River, Utada released "Traveling", "Hikari", and "Sakura Drops/Letters" between November 2001 and May 2002. Deep River, released in June 2002, sold 2.35 million copies in its first week. Oricon reported that sales eventually surpassed 3.6 million, making Utada the only singer or group in Japanese music history to have three consecutive albums surpass the three-million mark, by RIAJ standards. It was their third consecutive album to reach number 1 on Oricon's Yearly Albums chart and became the eighth best selling album of all time in Japan. In 2003, Utada's promotional schedule became more active due to an agreement with Island Records to release a debut album in the United States. "Colors" was their only single release for 2003.

=== 2004–2005: Foray into international market, and Exodus ===
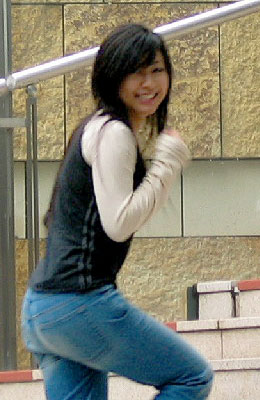
Utada in 2004

Utada's first singles compilation album Utada Hikaru Single Collection Vol. 1 was released on March 31, 2004. It became the best-selling album of 2004 in Japan, making them the only solo or group artist to reach number one four times on the yearly charts. It was the first compilation album to reach number 1 in six years on the yearly charts, and the first compilation album to reach number 1 in twenty-six years by a female artist. Despite its success, the album received little promotion and no new material; moreover, it charted longer on the Oricon Albums chart than any other Utada release to date (over two years). The album sold 2.58 million units in Japan, making it the 34th best-selling album ever in the country. A month later, on April 21, they released a lone Japanese single for 2004, "Dareka no Negai ga Kanau Koro", which topped the singles chart for two consecutive weeks and sold 365,000 units by the year's end. It was also the main theme song for Casshern, directed by their husband at the time, Kazuaki Kiriya.

In mid-2004, Utada moved back to New York, and began work on a recording contract with Island Def Jam Music Group. On October 5, 2004, they released a North American English-language debut album, Exodus, under the newly announced stage name "Utada". It was released on September 9 in Japan, with a special booklet and housed in a cardboard slipcase. In an MTV interview, they expressed skepticism about this American success: "I don't think it's the music that I'm concerned about. It's obviously that I look really different and there really aren't any completely Asian people [who are popular singers in the U.S.] right now." They also remarked on the album not being one that pandered to fans, but wanting to make it anyway. Exodus became their fourth consecutive release to debut at number 1 and boasted 500,000 copies in its first-week sales in Japan. American sales were not quite as successful: it reached number 160 in the US Billboard 200 chart; and peaked at number 5 in the Heatseekers chart. "Easy Breezy" was released as the lead single in early August 2004, followed up by "Devil Inside" six weeks later. Utada appeared on the cover of Interview magazine's June 2005 issue.

"Exodus '04" was released at the end of June 2005 and featured remixes from the Scumfrog, Richard Vission, JJ Flores and Peter Bailey. In the UK, Mercury added another two remixes for "You Make Me Want to Be a Man" in the original album, titled "You Make Me Want to Be a Man (Bloodshy & Avant Mix)" and "You Make Me Want to Be a Man (Junior Jack Mix)". By the end of the year, Utada was voted "Number 1 Favorite Artist of 2004" by Oricon's annual readers poll. The fourth single from Exodus, "You Make Me Want to Be a Man", was released in October 2005 in the UK. "Devil Inside" became a club hit in the U.S. and topped the Billboard Hot Dance/Club Airplay charts. Both the Exodus album and the "You Make Me Want to Be a Man" single were released in the UK, with different artwork from the US and Japanese versions.

=== 2005–2008: Return to Japan, Ultra Blue, and Heart Station ===
A year after the release of Exodus, Utada moved back to Tokyo and returned to the Japanese music scene. Leading up the release of a fourth album, Ultra Blue, they released a string of successful hit singles: "Colors" (number 1), "Dareka no Negai ga Kanau Koro" (number 1), "Be My Last" (number 1), "Passion" (number 4), and "Keep Tryin'" (number 2). The digital single "This Is Love" was released to promote the album, netting 1,000,000 downloads. Ultra Blue sold 500,317 copies in the first week, lower than that of the previous album, although it still topped the Oricon Daily, Weekly, and Monthly charts. Ultra Blue was Utada's fifth consecutive chart-topping Japanese album (excluding the English-language Exodus) to sell in excess of 500,000 copies in the first week. On July 13, Toshiba EMI published a report stating that Ultra Blue had sold over one million copies worldwide and four million digital ringtones already making it one of EMI's 10 best-selling albums of the past year. The album, which did not contain much pop music, was met with mixed reception, although the album was certified Million by RIAJ. Additionally, it was the highest-selling original studio album by a Japanese female artist in 2006. Ultra Blue later became available on the iTunes Japan online music store, charting at number 4 on the 2006 yearly download rankings. Two weeks after the release of Ultra Blue, Utada went on a nationwide tour titled Utada United 2006, from June 30 through September 12. This was their second concert tour after the Bohemian Summer 2000 tour.

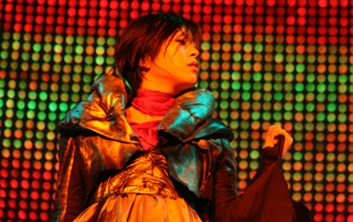
Utada performing during their Utada United 2006 tour

The singles that were released prior to Utada's fifth studio album, Heart Station, were able to reach the Top Five position on the chart, including the number 1 hit "Flavor of Life", which would become the best selling digital single in Japan with over 7,500,000 copies downloaded. Around the same time, they visited New York to talk with producers and executives at Island/Def Jam about recording a second English album. Later in the year a digital track by American R&B artist Ne-Yo, titled "Do You" from his 2007 album Because of You, featured Utada and was released in Japan on November 21 (the song was later featured on Ne-Yo's "best of" album, Ne-Yo: The Collection, released on September 2, 2009, in Japan and November 2009 in the US).

On June 30, 2007, the British EMI Group, which had held a 55% stake in Toshiba EMI since before Utada's debut in Japan, purchased the remaining 45% stake from the Japanese Toshiba Corporation, therefore making Toshiba EMI a wholly owned subsidiary of the London-based record label. Toshiba EMI then changed its name to EMI Music Japan to reflect Toshiba's divestiture from the business. Utada's first single under the label, "Beautiful World"/"Kiss & Cry" was released as a double A-side single on August 29, 2007, and also reached number 1 on the Oricon Daily Chart. Beautiful World was used as the theme song for Evangelion 1.0: You Are (Not) Alone, the 2007 film reboot of the anime, Neon Genesis Evangelion, while Kiss & Cry was used in a series of commercials for Nissin Foods' Freedom Project advertising campaign starting April 20, 2007, and was previously released as a digital download on May 31, 2007. The year 2007 ended with the single "Flavor of Life" becoming the best seller of 2007 and with Utada again voted "Number 1 Favorite Artist of 2007" by Oricon's annual readers poll, after a two-year absence from the top spot. They sold 12 million digital ringtones and songs in 2007, with "Flavor of Life" accounting for 7.5 million, the second-highest of any song worldwide that year. The single was featured as the main song in the second season of TV drama Hana yori Dango Returns.

Utada's fifth studio album, Heart Station, was released on March 19, 2008, becoming their fifth consecutive number-one Japanese studio album. Although it had collected the lowest first week sales for their career, with 480,081 copies sold, the sales of this album reached a million on the Oricon charts in January 2009, making it their first Japanese album to do so since the 2004 compilation album. It was given a certification of one million for shipments by the RIAJ. Heart Station became the best-selling digital-format album on the iTunes 2008 yearly album charts in Japan, and was also the highest-selling original studio album by a solo female artist on the Oricon Yearly Chart. The song "Prisoner of Love" was used as the theme-song for the television drama Last Friends. Although "Prisoner of Love" was not initially released as a single alone, it reached number 1 in iTunes and the Chako-Uta charts after it was released as a single for the drama. It reached number 2 at the Oricon Weekly charts. It marked the fourth successful drama tie-in for Utada, following 1999's Majo no Jōken and First Love, 2001's Hero and Can You Keep a Secret and 2007's Hana Yori Dango and Flavor of Life. On October 20, 2008, the song "Eternally" from Utada's 2001 album Distance was used as the theme for the drama Innocent Love. The song was later released as a digital single. By the end of the year, Utada was also voted the "Number 1 Favorite Artist of 2008" by Oricon's annual readers poll for the second consecutive year, and third time overall.

=== 2009–2010: Return to the US, and This Is the One ===
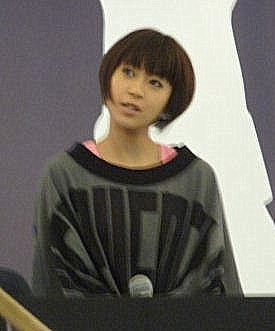
Utada in 2009

On December 16, 2008, information leaked onto the internet that Utada's next English-language single, titled "Come Back to Me", would be scheduled for airplay release through U.S. Rhythmic/Crossover and Mainstream formats on February 9 and 10, 2009 respectively via Island Records. Their second English album, titled This Is the One, was released on March 14, 2009, in Japan and on May 12, 2009, in the United States. This Is the One debuted at number 1 in Japan on March 13, 2009, the day it was released in Japan, but became their first album not to top the weekly chart since Precious. On March 30, 2009, Utada appeared on New York City radio station Z-100, the largest pop radio program in the U.S., and granted a live on-air interview on the station's Elvis Duran Morning Show, a breakthrough that would lead to a promotional schedule through the album's international physical release on May 12. They also sang the theme song for the second Evangelion film, Evangelion: 2.0 You Can (Not) Advance. The single was released on June 27, 2009, and is a remix of a previous single, "Beautiful World". The single is titled "Beautiful World -PLANiTb Acoustica Mix-".

On November 30, 2009, at Studio Coast, Tokyo, Utada sung a duet of Let It Snow with pop singer Mika. On December 21, 2009, Utada's Dirty Desire remixes were released only on Amazon, Zune Marketplace, and the U.S. iTunes Store, in support of This Is the One and an upcoming tour. The tour, Utada: In the Flesh 2010, was their first concert tour outside Japan and included eight cities in the US and two dates in London, UK. The tickets for the second London performance went on public sale November 13, and reportedly sold out in just five hours.

=== 2010–2015: Second return to Japan, Single Collection Vol. 2, Wild Life, and hiatus ===
In a personal blog post on August 9, 2010, Utada announced a long hiatus, writing "I don't know if it will be 2 years or 5 years." After having been focused on music from age 15 to 27, they expressed a need to have a broader range of experiences, and grow as a person. However, they also wrote that before the hiatus began, some new music would be released. Soon after the post, a compilation album was announced: Utada Hikaru Single Collection Vol. 2, with a release date of November 24, 2010. This album would include all of Utada's Japanese singles, from "Dareka no Negai ga Kanau Koro" to "Prisoner of Love", on disc one, as well as an extra EP featuring five new tracks. Later it was announced a DVD containing the promotional video for Goodbye Happiness would be included in all first-press edition pre-orders.

On September 27, 2010, Utada revealed a single, entitled "Hymne à l'amour (Ai no Anthem)", which became a commercial tie-in for Pepsi NEX. The song features both Japanese and French lyrics, written and translated by Utada. They performed a concert series titled Wild Life at Yokohama Arena to promote the album, their first Japanese concert since 2006's Utada United. On October 3, 2010, Utada's official EMI website was updated with the album artwork and final track list for Utada Hikaru Single Collection Vol. 2. First-press editions included a three-fold paper slip case, along with a Kuma good luck charm, and a lottery slip for fans to have a chance at winning one of 1000 tickets to Wild Life. In late October, it was revealed online at Tower Records Japan and several other websites that an English-language best-of album titled Utada the Best would become available in Japan on the same day as Utada Hikaru Single Collection Vol. 2, November 24. Utada reacted to the news, stating: "I understand that if it doesn't sell, I'm the one who will take the hit, but to be honest, I don't want my fans putting down money for something that my heart isn't in." and "The release of Utada the Best is entirely against my will. I wish that my fans won't have to buy it. There's no new material in it."

Later, Utada announced a single, "Goodbye Happiness", with its accompanying PV appearing publicly on November 9, 2010. The song was also chosen as the Recochoku Chaku-Uta TV commercial theme song. They also appeared on a track entitled "London City" with English rapper Devlin on his first studio album, Bud, Sweat and Beers, which was also released on November 1. On November 8, 2010, EMI Japan announced on its Web site that the company had made a global recording deal with Utada, also stating that all of their future work regardless of language would be released under one name: Hikaru Utada. This signaled the retirement of their Western stage name, Utada. First-week sales for Utada Hikaru Single Collection Vol. 2 were 231,000 units according to Oricon. The release marked Utada's seventh consecutive number 1 album (5 original and two best-ofs) since their debut, surpassing KinKi Kids' previous record of six. On April 10, 2011, they won the award for "Best Conceptual Video" in the Space Shower Music Video Awards for the promotional video for "Goodbye Happiness", which was also their directorial debut. The two-concert Wild Life tour took place on December 8 and 9, 2010 at Yokohama Arena. The opening concert was broadcast in 64 cinemas in Japan while it was simultaneously broadcast on Ustream, a live video streaming website. The two channels set up for the concert on Ustream were accessed a total of 925,000 times, with 345,000 unique viewers, which was a global record on Ustream.tv for the highest number of simultaneous accesses of any video, with the previous highest being only 100,000.

Japanese TV station NHK premiered a documentary about Utada on January 15, 2011, entitled Utada Hikaru: Ima no Watashi (宇多田ヒカル 〜今のわたし〜; "What I Am"), a documentary featuring studio performances ("Show Me Love (Not a Dream)" and "Goodbye Happiness") as well as a few clips from the Wild Life performances. It also featured a post–Wild Life interview with J-Wave host Chris Peppler, in which Utada expressed a desire to travel and do volunteer work overseas. They said they would also continue writing music during the hiatus. The documentary was broadcast internationally, in Europe on February 2, 2011, and in the US on February 12, 2011, on the NHK channel (TV Japan in America, and JSTV in Europe). A DVD and Blu-ray release of Wild Life were confirmed and initially set for release on April 6, 2011. However, on March 24, 2011, Utada tweeted that both the DVD/Blu-ray of the Wild Life tour had been postponed, due to the earthquake and resulting tsunami in Japan damaging the pressing factories. The DVD was released on April 20, 2011, with the Blu-ray following. On December 7, 2011, Recochoku updated their yearly download and awards chart, with their Utada Hikaru Single Collection Vol. 1 listed as the second-most-downloaded album of 2011.

On November 16, 2012, Utada's YouTube account uploaded a video entitled "桜流し" ("Sakura Nagashi", meaning "Flowing Cherry Blossoms"). The single was co-written with Paul Carter and was digitally released on November 17, 2012. A DVD single was released a month later. "Sakura Nagashi" is the theme song from the animation movie Evangelion: 3.0 You Can (Not) Redo. In September 2012, the British EMI group was broken up and sold to various companies. On April 1, 2013, Utada's record company, EMI Music Japan, was absorbed into Universal Music Japan, became defunct as a company and was renamed to EMI Records Japan. Therefore, all of their further releases before switching to Sony Music Entertainment Japan would be through Universal Music Japan. On December 9, 2013, to celebrate the 15th anniversary of First Love, EMI Records released Utada: In the Flesh 2010 tour footage on iTunes and announced a re-release of First Love, including a special limited edition that contained the original album remastered, instrumentals from the original tracks, unreleased tracks and live footage from Utada's first live show, Luv Live. On December 8, 2014, Universal Music Japan released a tribute album entitled Utada Hikaru no Uta. The album features cover versions of Utada's back catalogue of songs by different popular artists such as AI, Ayumi Hamasaki, Peabo Bryson, Ringo Sheena, and more. On December 26, 2014, Universal Music Japan revealed through media outlet Weekly Bunshun that Utada only had one album left before the contract with the label ends, and that a return to the music industry was under discussion.

=== 2015–2016: Parenthood and Fantôme ===
In 2015, Utada revealed the birth of a son on their blog, and mentioned work on an album primarily written during pregnancy. They asked for patience leading up to the release during the transition into parenthood. In January 2016, it was reported that Utada would release a song in the spring. "Hanataba o Kimi ni" ("Bouquet for You") was the theme for the television show Toto Neechan (とと姉ちゃん)), which aired on April 4, 2016. In February 2016, "Manatsu no Tōriame" was aired on April 4, 2016, to be the theme to a late-night TV station's news show, News Zero. That same day, Utada's website announced the official song's release, as digital singles, on April 15. Utada's website was also updated with the announcement of a project titled "New-Turn", in which fans were encouraged to purchase their music and to use the hashtag "#おかえりHIKKI" ("Welcome Back Hikki") on Twitter. The aim was to use proceeds from the music purchased to plant more cherry blossom trees in the tsunami-damaged areas of Japan after the 2011 Tōhoku earthquake. The website was also confirmed their return to artistic activities.

On August 8, 2016, the album's title, track list and cover were released. The album's title was announced as Fantôme (French: 'ghost'), containing eight new songs, as well as the previous three singles, for a track listing totaling eleven tracks. Following its release on September 28, Fantôme was commercially and critically successful. It debuted atop the Oricon Albums Chart and stayed there for four consecutive weeks, the most of any Utada studio album since First Love. It was awarded Album of the Year at the Japan Record Awards and received positive reviews from media outlets. At the end of the year, it was ranked the third-best-selling physical record of the year by Oricon, as well as the best-selling digital album, according to Billboard Japan.

=== 2017–2019: Label transfer to Sony Music, Hatsukoi and tour ===
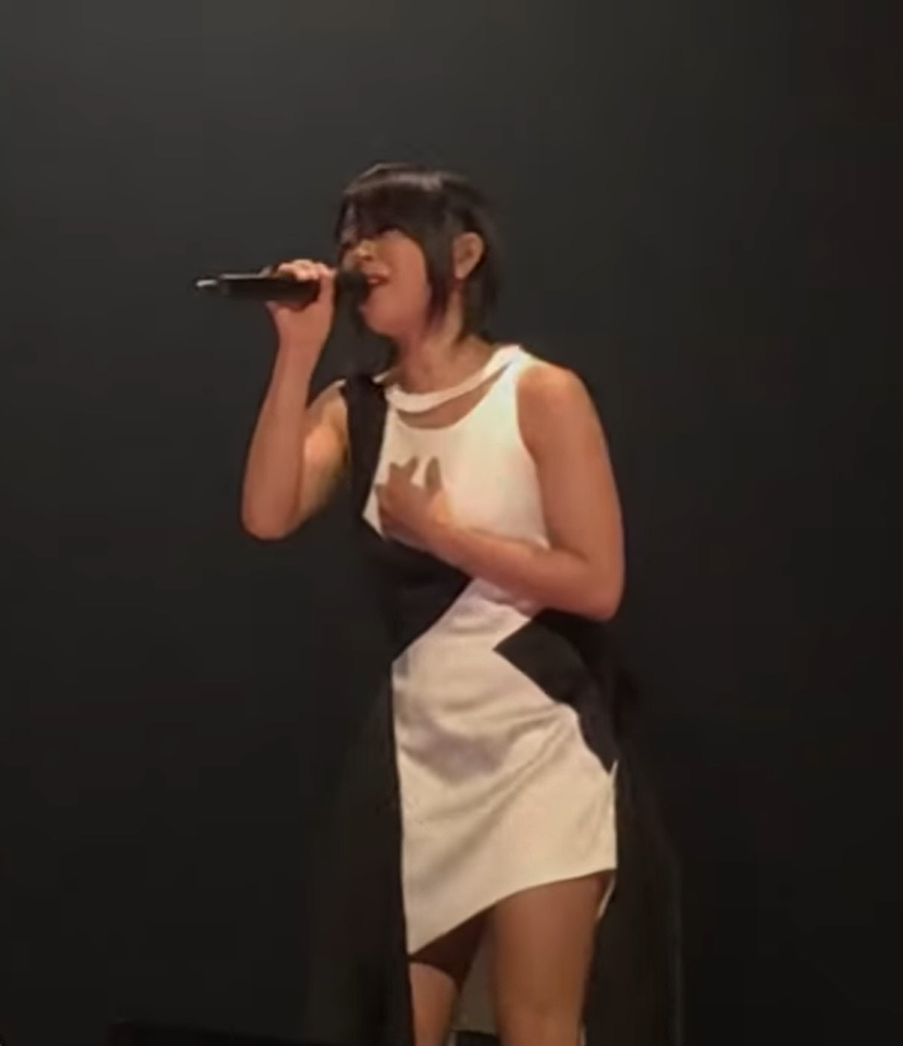
Utada performing during their Laughter in the Dark Tour in 2018

On February 9, 2017, it was announced that Utada would switch labels to Sony Music Japan sub-label Epic Records once the contract with Universal expired in March. The label announced that new material would be released later in 2017. The first digital single under the label, called "Ōzora de Dakishimete", was released digitally worldwide on July 10, 2017. The second one, called "Forevermore", was released on July 28. A third digital single, "Anata", was released on December 8. On December 8, they announced that their Japanese discography, from debut single Automatic to their sixth album Fantôme, would be available on all streaming services but Spotify, where it would become available a month later on January 8, 2018.

Utada co-produced Nariaki Obukuro's major label debut album, Bunriha no Natsu. The first single off the album, "Lonely One", has Utada credited as a featured artist and was released on January 17, 2018. On February 10, 2018, it was announced that Utada would provide the theme song "Chikai"/"Don't Think Twice" for the video game Kingdom Hearts III. A third studio collaboration with Obukuro was announced to be released in Ringo Sheena's tribute album, Adam to Eve no Ringo.

On April 17, 2018, the song "Hatsukoi", was unveiled in the drama Hana Nochi Hare: Hanadan Next Season. It was the second song Utada had collaborated on for the Hana Yori Dango drama series, after "Flavor of Life" in 2007. The single was released on May 30. "Play a Love Song", the theme song for Suntory Water SWITCH&SPARKLE, was released on April 25. On June 27, Utada's seventh Japanese album Hatsukoi was released, their first under Epic. A domestic concert tour, called Hikaru Utada Laughter in the Dark Tour 2018 was held from November 6 until December 9, for a total of 12 dates at 6 different venues. The album debuted at number one on the Oricon physical and digital weekly charts, with total sales of over 242,000.

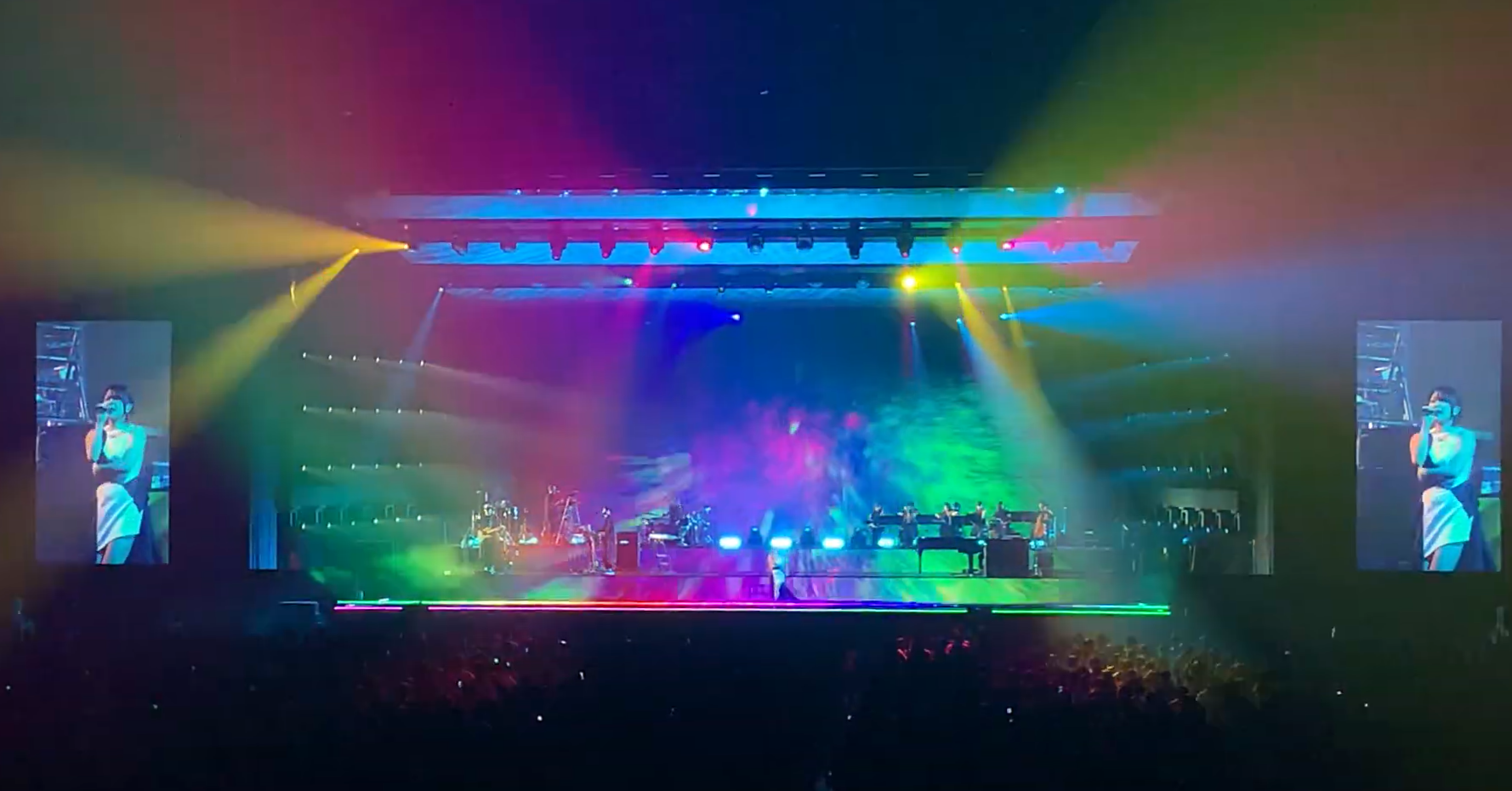
The stage for the Laughter in the Dark tour (2018)

On September 28, it was reported that Utada would release a single titled "Face My Fears" as the theme song for Kingdom Hearts III. They co-produced the song with American musicians Skrillex and Poo Bear. "Face My Fears" was released as a CD single on January 18, 2019, making it their first release on the format in eleven years since their 2008 single "Prisoner of Love". It was also their first release with original English songs since This Is the One in 2009. The song became their first US Billboard Hot 100 at number 98, and it peaked at number 9 in Hot Dance/Electronic Songs chart.

On June 26, 2019, Utada's Laughter in the Dark tour film was released worldwide on Netflix, with English subtitles translated by the singer. On November 1, 2019, an Utada collaboration with singer-songwriter Ringo Sheena was released, called "Roman to Soroban LDN ver." ("The Sun and the Moon"). It was featured in Sheena's best-of album Apple of Universal Gravity. An alternative version of the song, called "Roman to Soroban TYO ver.", was available on November 25. On November 27, 2019, Utada released "Shonen Jidai". It appears as track number 5 on the Inoue Yosue Tribute album.

=== 2020–2022: Bad Mode ===
On May 8, 2020, Utada released "Time", the theme song for the NTV drama Bishoku Tantei Akechi Goro. The single "Darenimo Iwanai" was released on May 29 as the tie-in track for Suntory, Utada starring in the commercial. In the second episode of the Instagram live series Jitaku Kakuri-chu no Hikaru Paisen ni Kike!, Utada confirmed that work was underway for their next album, including English versions of the Japanese songs. On December 3, 2020, it was announced that Takeru Sato and Hikari Mitsushima will star in a Netflix show based on Utada's songs "First Love" and "Hatsukoi". The streaming show, titled First Love, was released in November 2022. On December 25, 2020, Utada's official website announced a new single titled "One Last Kiss" as the theme song for the film Evangelion: 3.0+1.0 Thrice Upon a Time. The song was later postponed to March 8, 2021 due to the COVID-19 pandemic.

Utada sang the theme "Pink Blood" for the 2021 anime To Your Eternity. They released the single "Kimi ni Muchū" for TBS drama series Saiai that November. Bad Mode, Utada's eleventh studio album, was released on January 19, 2022. Their first bilingual album, Bad Mode includes collaborations with a variety of producers, including Skrillex and Poo Bear, A. G. Cook, and Sam Shepherd. The album reached number one on Japan's Oricon and Billboard charts. On April 16, 2022, Utada performed at Coachella Valley Music and Arts Festival's main stage, their first time in a music festival in the United States. Their setlist included the tracks "Simple and Clean", "Automatic", "First Love" and a new song, called "T". A studio version of "T", featuring rapper Warren Hue, was released as part of the 88rising EP Head in the Clouds Forever. On June 9, 2022, the concert Hikaru Utada Live Sessions from Air Studios was released on Netflix.

=== 2023–present: 25th anniversary, Science Fiction ===
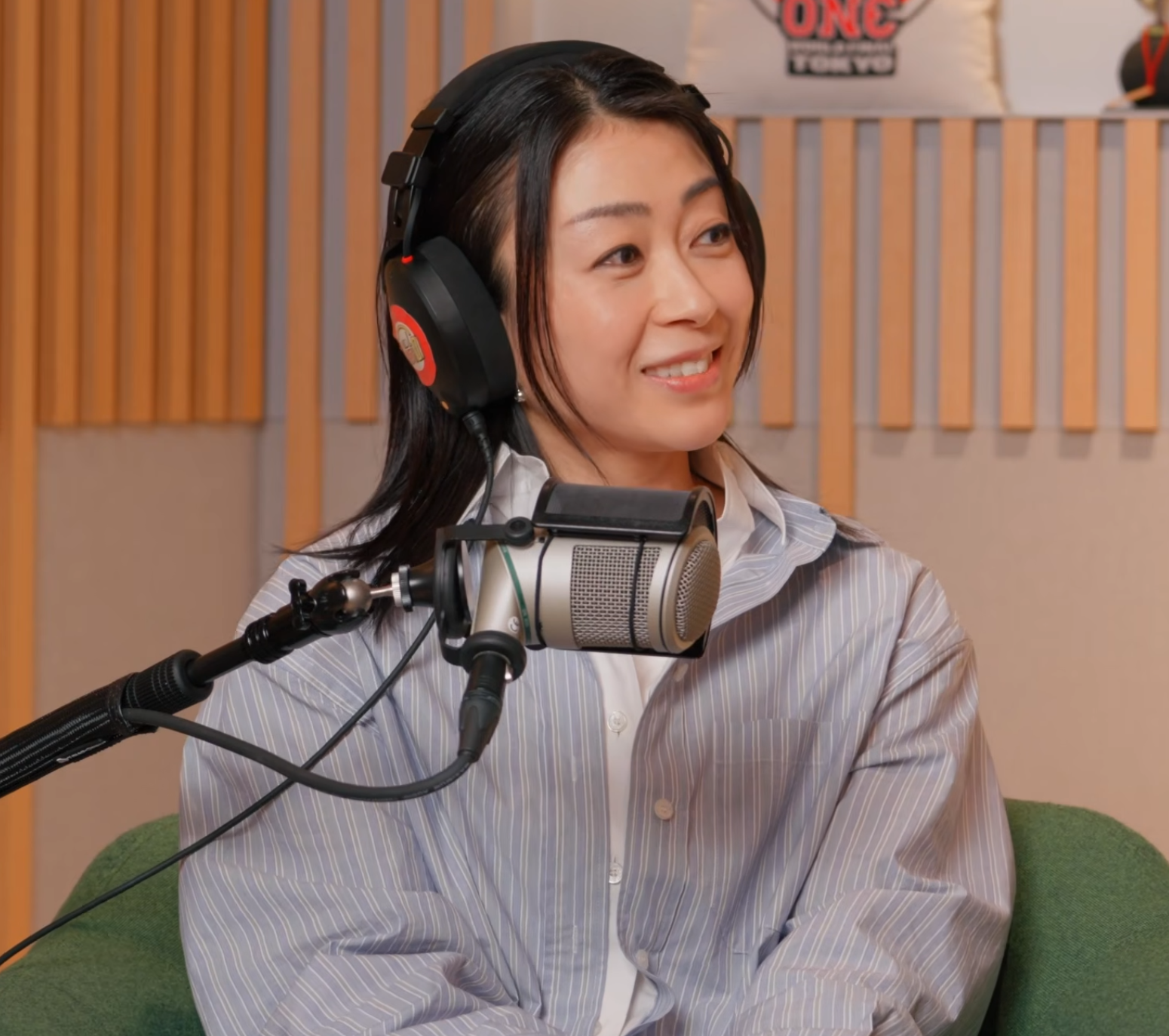
Utada in 2026

In celebration of their 40th birthday, January 19, 2023, a live-streaming event was held called 40Dai-Wa-Iroiro. The stream consisted of a question and answer session with fans, a talk with actors Takeru Satoh and Yuriko Yoshitaka, who starred in the 2022 Netflix drama First Love, and live music performances. Recordings from the session were released digitally on February 17, 2023. A single titled "Gold: Mata Au Hi Made" was announced as the theme song of Kingdom 3: The Flame of Destiny, which was released on July 28. The song was co-produced by British producer A. G. Cook. On December 9th, Utada announced a greatest hits album, Science Fiction, to commemorate their 25th anniversary since debut. A tour of the same name was announced for Japan in July 2024, as well dates in Taiwan and Hong Kong. On August 22, 2024, Utada was featured in a new version of "Stay With Me", which was released to celebrate the 10th anniversary of Sam Smith's album In The Lonely Hour.

From November 20, 2024 to January 29, 2025, Hikaru Utada Live Chronicles in Cinema was held in select theaters throughout Japan. This was a screening of all nine of Hikaru Utada's live tours, from Luv Live (1999) to Science Fiction Tour 2024 (2024). All nine tours were re-released on Blu-ray on January 8, 2025.

In March 2025, an Ayataka commercial featured the track "Mine or Yours", later released as a single on May 2. An online event—Hikaru Utada Online Release Party: Mine or Yours—was held as part of the promotion, along with the artist appearing on The First Take. In August, it was announced that Utada would be collaborating with Kenshi Yonezu on the song "Jane Doe", which serves as the ending theme to Chainsaw Man – The Movie: Reze Arc, which released on September 24, 2025.

In 2026, Utada appeared as a featured artist for the song "Home" from Charlie Puth's album Whatever's Clever! Their single, "Pappaparadise", was released on March 29 for the anime Chibi Maruko-chan. In April, Universal Japan announced two of Utada's English studio albums, Exodus (2004) and This Is the One (2009), would be remastered and released on vinyl for the first time. Both remasters were released on June 24, 2026.

In June 2026, Utada recorded a duet version of "Pappaparadise" with Japanese rock singer Hiroto Kōmoto. The release includes an accompanying music video featuring both singers on a motorbike. They also recorded a 40-minute discussion together, focusing on their careers and the making of the single and video.

== Musical style ==
Utada is a J-pop artist, bringing their American-inflected R&B vocal style to a mix of ballads, bouncy dance-pop, and standard pop songs. Utada's official website cites 15 musicians and composers as their favorite artists: Freddie Mercury, Cocteau Twins, Nine Inch Nails, Jimi Hendrix, Prince, Édith Piaf, Chick Corea, the Blue Nile, Björk, Lenny Kravitz, Béla Bartók, Mozart, Jeff Buckley, Yutaka Ozaki, and Hibari Misora. Elsewhere, they have also listed R&B artists Aaliyah, Mariah Carey, and Mary J. Blige as inspirations, and have previously mentioned growing up as a fan of Madonna, Sting, and the Cure.

== Personal life ==
Utada is bilingual and speaks English and Japanese fluently.

Before the release of their 2002 album Deep River, Utada was hospitalised with complications following the removal of a benign ovarian tumor.

On June 26, 2021, Utada came out as non-binary in an Instagram livestream. Utada uses both she/her and they/them pronouns. Utada also said in regards to the English language honorifics Ms. and Mrs., "It makes me uncomfortable to be identified so markedly by my marital status or sex, and I don't relate to any of those prefixes. Every time, I feel like I'm forced to misrepresent myself." Utada expressed support for such alternatives as Mx.

=== Family and relationships ===
On September 7, 2002, Hikaru married Kazuaki Kiriya, a photographer and film director who had directed several of their music videos. On March 2, 2007, the couple announced their divorce, citing personal changes and lack of communication due to the nature of their jobs.

On February 3, 2014, Utada announced their engagement to a private citizen, asking for fans and the media to view their personal lives from a "respectable distance". The couple were married on May 23, 2014, and divorced in April 2018. In 2015, Utada gave birth to their son.

== Discography ==
Japanese studio albums

- First Love (1999)
- Distance (2001)
- Deep River (2002)
- Ultra Blue (2006)
- Heart Station (2008)
- Fantôme (2016)
- Hatsukoi (2018)
- Bad Mode (2022)

English studio albums

- Precious (as Cubic U) (1998)
- Exodus (2004)
- This Is the One (2009)

== Tour ==
=== Concert tours ===
- Bohemian Summer 2000 Tour (2000)
- Utada United 2006 Tour (2006)
- Utada: In the Flesh 2010 Tour (2010)
- Laughter in the Dark Tour (2018)
- Science Fiction Tour (2024)

=== One-off concerts ===
- Luv Live (1999)
- Utada Hikaru in Budokan 2004 (Note: Also known as "Utada Hikaru in Budokan 「No.5」" or "Hikaru No. 5" as the concerts were held to celebrate Utada's fifth anniversary of their musical career in Japan) (2004)
- Wild Life (2010)

== See also ==
- Capitol Records
- List of artists who reached number one on the U.S. dance chart
- List of best-selling music artists in Japan
- List of number-one dance hits (United States)
