= Hatsukoi (Hikaru Utada song) =

2018 single by Hikaru Utada

- 2022 remastering cover

Single by Hikaru Utada

from the album Hatsukoi
- Language: Japanese
- Released: May 30, 2018
- Recorded: March 2018
- Genre: J-pop; Soul
- Length: 4:41
- Label: Epic; Sony Music Japan
- Songwriter(s): Hikaru Utada
- Producer(s): Hikaru Utada

Hikaru Utada singles chronology
"Play a Love Song" (2018)	"Hatsukoi" (2018)	"Chikai" (2018)

Music video
- "Hatsukoi" on YouTube

"Hatsukoi" is a song by Japanese-American singer-songwriter Hikaru Utada. It is their fifth single under the label Epic Records Japan and was taken from their seventh Japanese-language studio album Hatsukoi. The song was released as a digital download on May 30 and was used as a tie-in for the Japanese television drama Hana Nochi Hare - Hanadan Next Season. It's the second song that Utada delivered to the series, after Flavor of Life in 2007.

This song and "First Love" from the 1999 album of the same name inspired the 2022 Netflix series First Love. In December 2022, "Hatsukoi" was remastered alongside "First Love" in Dolby Atmos.

== Music video ==
The song's corresponding promo video is directed by Yasuhito Tsuge, the same director that worked with Utada on the "Manatsu no Tooriame" music video. Released on the same day as the song, it can be purchased via iTunes store, and has simultaneously been released for rotation to Japanese TV Station M-On. Following the good reception of the "Forevermore" and "Anata" music video documentaries with M-On, a new one will be exhibited at the channel on June 27, the same day of Hatsukoi album release.

== Commercial performance ==
The song topped the Oricon download chart for 2 consecutive weeks, making Hikaru Utada the only female singer to reach the top of the chart 3 times since its beginning.

== Track listing ==
All lyrics are written by Hikaru Utada; all music is composed by Hikaru Utada.

Digital version
No.	Title	Length
1.	"Hatsukoi"	4:41

== Charts ==
=== Weekly charts ===
Chart (2018)	Peak position
Billboard Japan Hot 100	2
Billboard Japan Download Songs	1
Oricon Digital Download Songs	1

=== Year-end charts ===
Chart (2018)	Peak position
Billboard Download Songs Year-end Chart	17

=== Sales and certifications ===
Chart	Amount
RIAJ digital downloads	250,000 (Platinum)

== Certifications ==
Certifications for "Hatsukoi"
Region	Certification	Certified units/sales
Streaming
Japan (RIAJ)	Gold	50,000,000^{†}
^{†} Streaming-only figures based on certification alone.

== Release history ==
Release history and formats for "Hatsukoi"
Region	Date	Format(s)	Version	Label	Ref.
Various	May 30, 2018	Digital download; streaming	Original	Epic Japan	
Various	December 9, 2022	Digital download; streaming	2022 remastering	Epic Japan	
Japan	December 9, 2022	Vinyl	"First Love / Hatsukoi" 2022 Remastered	Epic; USM Japan	
