= Face My Fears =

2019 single by Hikaru Utada and Skrillex

Single by Hikaru Utada and Skrillex

from the album Bad Mode
- Language: English; Japanese
- Released: January 18, 2019
- Recorded: 2017–2018
- Genre: Electronic dance; future bass
- Length: 3:42
- Label: Epic; Sony Music Japan
- Songwriters: Skrillex; Jason "Poo Bear" Boyd; Hikaru Utada
- Producers: Skrillex; Poo Bear; Utada

Hikaru Utada singles chronology
"Chikai" (2018)	"Face My Fears" (2019)	"Time" (2020)

Skrillex singles chronology
"Agen Wida" (2018)	"Face My Fears" (2019)	"Warlordz" (2019)

Music video
- "Face My Fears" on YouTube

"Face My Fears" is a song by Japanese-American singer Hikaru Utada and American DJ Skrillex. It was released on various formats by Epic and Sony Music Japan on January 18, 2019, and serves as the lead single from Utada's eleventh studio album, Bad Mode (2022). It was recorded in both English and Japanese and serves as the theme song for Square Enix's 2019 action role-playing game Kingdom Hearts III. After being approached by Square Enix to work on the video game, Utada asked Skrillex to remix "Don't Think Twice" for the game, but later decided to collaborate and create a new song as well.

The song was written, composed, and produced by Utada, Skrillex, and Jason "Poo Bear" Boyd. Written in the same key as Utada's single "Sanctuary" (2006) and the song "Dearly Beloved" from the Kingdom Hearts video game series, "Face My Fears" is an electronic dance number with elements of future bass, featuring varying tempos and structure changes. The song's lyrics are about taking risks in life and confronting one's own fears. Furthermore, "Face My Fears" was packaged as an extended play, and featured the English and Japanese B-side song "Don't Think Twice", both of which appear in the same video game.

Many music critics praised "Face My Fears" for its sound, production quality, and faithfulness to the video game. Commercially, it performed moderately in Japan, reaching number six on the Oricon Singles Chart and number three on the Japan Hot 100. Additionally, it charted in France, New Zealand, Scotland, the United Kingdom, and the United States, marking Utada's first success outside of Japan. To promote the single, a music video featuring Kingdom Hearts III visuals was uploaded to YouTube.

== Background and development ==
In early 2018, Utada announced that they were collaborating with Square Enix to create a theme song for the third Kingdom Hearts game. They revealed the song "Chikai," which was translated into English for the game's international audience and titled "Don't Think Twice." It marks Utada's third collaboration with Square Enix and the video game franchise, following "Simple & Clean" and "Sanctuary" for the first and second instalments. "Chikai" was released on January 27, 2018, as the sixth single from Utada's tenth studio album, Hatsukoi (2018).

In September, Utada confirmed that they were collaborating with American DJ Skrillex and producer Jason "Poo Bear" Boyd, and would work together on a single called "Face My Fears". Square Enix later revealed that it would be the opening theme song for Kingdom Hearts III, Utada's fourth inclusion to the series. Utada and Skrillex first met in 2012 at the German metal concert Rock am Ring and Rock im Park. Four years later, Utada approached Skrillex about remixing "Don't Think Twice," which would be featured in the video game. However, he preferred the original version because it "didn't feel like that jazzy melody lent toward a dance remix."

Skrillex approached Utada in 2017 while they were in London to collaborate on a project with Poo Bear. They decided to work on new material "just for fun" after the remix of "Don't Think Twice" fell through, and wrote "Face My Fears" in one hour. The song was written in the same key as Utada's single "Passion" (2006) and the composition "Dearly Beloved," which is used throughout the video game series. Masahito Komori helped to record both the Japanese and English versions at Metropolis Studios in London, England. Skrillex and Tom Morris mixed the songs, while Bob Ludwig mastered them at Gateway Mastering Studios.

== Composition ==
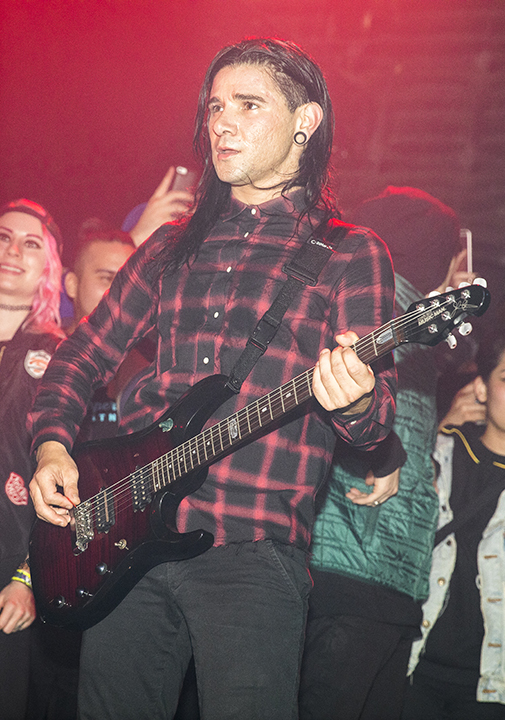
American DJ Skrillex serves as a collaborative artist to "Face My Fears".

"Face My Fears" is a musical departure from Utada's previous Kingdom Hearts contributions, shifting from a mid-tempo pop sound to more emotional EDM-infused music with elements of future bass. The song starts with a piano melody and Utada singing the lyrics, "Breath, should I take a deep?" The lyrics and chorus were cited as early examples of self-empowerment themes. The pre-chorus changes tempo, and Utada repeats the song's title several times, accompanied by synths and electronic music. The song's drop incorporates brostep and further future bass elements, noted in Skrillex's individual music, and "reflect the pace of the adventures depicted in the game, expressed through a contemporary style infused with elements of the current post-EDM trend."

Many critics also noted the song's varied structure, with PopMatters writer Peter Piatkowski describing it as a "skittery, EDM-styled ballad." Piakowski also stated that the song's composition, production, songwriting, and Utada's vocals were "shredded, mutilated, and processed to melt with the rest of the busy production." Nick Yopko of EDM.com described the track as a "love letter to a series both artists have held near and dear to their hearts." Bradly Stern of MuuMuse thought its "mainstream EDM festival-friendly" sound was a musical departure from Utada's previous two albums, Fantôme (2016) and Hatsukoi, which Stern described as "somber." Mick Jacobs of Spectrum Culture compared the sound to Jack Ü, a collaboration between Skrillex and American producer Diplo.

== Release and promotion ==
"Face My Fears" was first revealed in October 2018, with previews of both the song and "Don't Think Twice" appearing in trailers for Kingdom Hearts III. On January 18, 2019, Epic and Sony Music Japan released it in a variety of formats, and serves as the lead single from Utada's eleventh studio album, Bad Mode (2022). The bonus editions of the album also included an A.G. Cook remix. The Japanese version was released seven days before the game's release, and on February 1, Skrillex posted a music video to his YouTube channel that included a montage and trailer of various Kingdom Hearts III scenes. Additionally, the song was packaged as an extended play titled Face My Fears, featuring both the Japanese and English versions of "Face My Fears" and "Don't Look Twice", and was collectively produced by Utada and long-time collaborators, Akira Miyake and Utada's father Teruzane. In March, a vinyl format was released in Japan, the United Kingdom, and the United States. A live recording of the English version was uploaded to Utada's YouTube channel.

== Critical reception ==
"Face My Fears" received positive reviews from music critics and Kingdom Hearts fans. The song was praised by Billboard, who said it "contains universal qualities of how game music ought to be while also embracing a modern sound and beat design, and hit producer Poo Bear's prowess presumably contributed to the achievement of this fine balance." Mike Salbato of RPGFan described it as "upbeat" and "energetic," adding, "It's a fun song that I quickly warmed to, and once I saw it accompanying game footage, I was even further convinced." Mick Jacobs of Spectrum Culture praised the song's sound and overall production, writing: "'Face My Fears' may not bring much new to the table, but it does signify the staying power of a J-pop icon."

According to Bradley Stern of MuuMuse, the song "feels fresh for all parties involved" and highlights Utada's "signature vulnerability and bravery". EDM.com writer Nick Yopko described it as a "uplifting future bass anthem fully encapsulates the epic, adventurous nature of the game it accompanies," while Rolling Stone editor said it "builds from a simple piano ballad to a dizzying EDM chorus filled with heavy programming and vocal processing." Peter Piatkowski of PopMatters was slightly critical of its structure and production, calling it "jerky" but "catchy". Sputnikmusic, on the other hand, was critical of its inclusion in Bad Mode, claiming that its overall structure did not fit with the rest of the album's content.

== Commercial performance ==
"Face My Fears" was a modest commercial success in Japan. The physical format debuted at number two on the Oricon Daily Singles chart. It later reached number six on the Oricon Singles Chart, selling 12,732 units in its first week, Utada's lowest peak in the country. Across all formats, it moved 33,462 single-equivalent units. It spent 15 weeks on the chart and sold over 31,000 physical units in the country, making it one of Utada's least successful singles in the region. Furthermore, the Japanese version debuted at number six on the Oricon Digital Singles Chart, with 14,686 downloads. "Face My Fears" also reached number three on the Japan Hot 100, number 52 on the France Download chart, number 24 on the New Zealand Hot Singles Chart, number 31 on their Scottish Singles Chart, and number 30 on the UK Singles Download Chart.

In the United States, the English version debuted at number 98 on the Billboard Hot 100, marking Utada's first entry on the chart. Additionally, it peaked at number 9 on the Hot Dance/Electronic Songs chart, number 18 on the Digital Songs chart, and topped the World Digital Songs chart. In its first week, it sold 10,000 downloads and generated 2.5 million streams in the United States. It's also Utada's first appearance on a Billboard chart since 2009, when "Dirty Desire" peaked at number 16 on the Dance Club Songs chart. By the end of the year, "Face My Fears" was ranked 49th on the Hot Dance/Electronic Songs chart and sixth on the World Digital Songs chart.

== Track listing ==
Japanese release (Note: The track listing for the Japanese/Taiwanese release are used on physical and digital formats, referenced here:)
No.	Title	Length
1.	"Face My Fears" (Japanese version)	3:42
2.	"Chikai"	4:34
3.	"Face My Fears" (English version)	3:42
4.	"Don't Think Twice"	4:34

International release (Note: The track listing for the International release are used on physical and digital formats, referenced here:)
No.	Title	Length
1.	"Face My Fears" (English version)	3:42
2.	"Don't Think Twice"	4:34
3.	"Face My Fears" (Japanese version)	3:42
4.	"Chikai"	4:34

== Credits and personnel ==
Credits adapted from the liner notes of the Face My Fears EP.

Locations

- Recorded at Metropolis Studios in London; mastered at Gateway Mastering Studios.

Personnel

- Hikaru Utada - vocals, background vocals, arranger, composer, producer, programmer, songwriter
- Skrillex - featuring artist, composer, mixing, producer, programmer, songwriter
- Chris Dave - drums
- Jason "Poo Bear" Boyd - arranger, composer, songwriter, producer
- Jodi Milliner - bass
- Reuben James - piano
- Steve Fitzmaurice - recording engineer
- Masahito Komori - vocal engineer
- Tom Norris - mixing engineer, programmer
- Bob Ludwig - mastering engineer (all tracks)

== Charts ==
=== Weekly charts ===
Chart (2019)	Peak position
France Downloads (SNEP)	52
Japan (Oricon)	6
Japan (Japan Hot 100)	3
New Zealand Hot Singles (RMNZ)	24
Scotland Singles (OCC)	31
UK Singles Downloads (OCC)	30
US Billboard Hot 100	98
US Hot Dance/Electronic Songs (Billboard)	9
US World Digital Song Sales (Billboard)	1

=== Year-end charts ===
Chart (2019)	Position
US Hot Dance/Electronic Songs (Billboard)	49
US World Digital Songs (Billboard)	6

== Release history ==
"Face My Fears" release history
Region	Date	Format	Label	Ref(s).
Various	January 19, 2018	Digital download; streaming	Epic Japan; Sony Music Japan	
Japan	January 19, 2018	CD single	Epic Japan; Sony Music Japan	
Taiwan	January 19, 2018	CD single	Epic; Sony Music	
Japan	March 6, 2019	Vinyl	Epic Japan	
United Kingdom	29 March 2019	Vinyl	Epic Japan; Masterworks	
United States	29 March 2019	Vinyl	Epic Japan; Masterworks	
