= Anata (song) =

Single by Hikaru Utada

from the album Hatsukoi
- Language: Japanese
- Released: December 8, 2017
- Recorded: Summer 2017, London
- Genre: J-pop; R&B; soul
- Length: 4:41
- Label: Epic; Sony Music Japan
- Songwriter: Hikaru Utada
- Producer: Hikaru Utada

Hikaru Utada singles chronology
"Forevermore" (2017)	"Anata" (2017)	"Lonely One" (2018)

Music video
- "Anata" on YouTube

"Anata" (あなた, lit. "You") is a song by Japanese-American singer-songwriter Hikaru Utada. It is their third single under the label Epic Records Japan, from their tenth studio album Hatsukoi. The song was used as a tie-in for movie Destiny: The Tale of Kamakura, and was released as a digital download on December 8. The song is their first movie tie-in in 5 years, since "Sakura Nagashi" was released in 2012 for Evangelion: 3.0 You Can (Not) Redo. The song was written with a Buddhist's view to show both the real and fantasy mixed world shown in the movie. Besides the movie, the song is also featured in a Sony campaign to promote a wireless headphone line, in which they themself also appears.

== Music video ==
The song's corresponding promo video is directed by Jamie-James Medina, the same director that worked with Utada on the "Forevermore" music video. Released on the same day as the song, it can be purchased via iTunes store, and has simultaneously been released for rotation to Japanese TV Station M-On. Following the good reception of the "Forevermore" music video documentary with M-On, one was also shown for the "Anata" video on December 9, 2017 as part of a 24 hours special that aired all of their Japanese live concerts and music videos. The video shows Utada performing in the studio along with musicians. Different aspect ratios are used throughout the video.

== Commercial performance ==
"Anata" debuted at #1 in 11 Japanese digital music charts and #1 in iTunes store in 7 Asian countries. On the issue dated December 18, 2017, the song debuted at #1 on the Billboard Japan Download Songs chart, resulting in an entry at #3 on the Hot 100. In its first full week, the song rose to #2 on the chart, becoming Utada's highest charting entry since "Hanataba o Kimi ni" reached the same position in May 2016. "Anata" also became the inaugural holder of the #1 position on the newly created Oricon digital songs chart (the same feat they also achieved in November 2016 with their album Fantôme, when their digital albums chart was created), selling 63,871 copies in the week spanning from December 11 to 17, out-selling the nearest competition by a margin of 3 to 1. In its third week, "Anata" dropped slightly on the Hot 100 to #5, while also dropping to #2 on the Digital Songs chart with 37,071 copies sold, according to Oricon. The fourth week saw it still going strong, again charting at #2 on Oricon's Digital Songs chart with sales of 25,921, while dropping one position to number 6 on the Hot 100. "Anata" spent one more week inside the top 10 on the Hot 100 at #10, while falling to #4 on both Oricon's, as well as Billboard's digital single songs chart, with Oricon download figures of 17,347. Next, it fell off the top 10, selling 14,723 additional copies. "Anata" has spent seven consecutive weeks inside the Hot 100's top 20, five of them inside the top 10.

During its chart run on the Oricon Weekly Digital Single Ranking, it has sold 206,813 digital downloads (excluding the song's first three days on sale, for which no data was published).

== Track listing ==
All lyrics are written by Hikaru Utada; all music is composed by Hikaru Utada.

Digital version
No.	Title	Length
1.	"Anata"	4:41

== Release history ==
Region	Date	Format
Worldwide	December 8, 2017	Digital download

== Charts ==
=== Weekly charts ===
Chart (2017)	Peak position
Billboard Japan Hot 100	2
Billboard Download Songs	1
US Billboard World Digital Song Sales	13
Oricon Digital Download Songs	1

=== Year-end charts ===
Chart (2018)	Peak position
Billboard Download Songs Year-end Chart	6

== Sales and certifications ==
Chart	Amount
RIAJ digital downloads	284,694+ (Platinum)
RIAJ streaming	50,000,000
