= Kimi ni Muchū =

Single by Hikaru Utada

from the album Bad Mode
- Released: November 26, 2021
- Recorded: 2021
- Genre: J-pop, R&B, electronica
- Length: 4:17
- Label: Epic; Sony Music Japan
- Songwriter: Hikaru Utada
- Producers: Utada; A. G. Cook

Hikaru Utada singles chronology
"Pink Blood" (2021)	"Kimi ni Muchū" (2021)	"Gold (Mata Au Hi Made)" (2023)

Music video
- "Kimi ni Muchū" on YouTube

"Kimi ni Muchū" (君に夢中; "I'm Crazy About You") is a song recorded by Japanese-American singer Hikaru Utada. It was released via Epic Records Japan and Sony Music Japan on November 26, 2021, as one of the several singles for their eleventh studio album, Bad Mode (2022). The track serves as the main theme for the TBS Friday night drama Saiai. It's co-produced by Utada and the British music producer A. G. Cook.

== Critical reception ==
"Kimi ni Muchū" was well received by music critics. Music critic Koremasa Uno pointed out the similarities between "Kimi ni Muchū" and Utada's 2008 track "Stay Gold" in the prelude and chord progression. Nanami Ikusa of Numero Tokyo praised the track's production and said "this is a sound that can only be produced by Hikaru Utada among Japanese artists today." Reio Fujii on an InterFM radio program said: "When I first listened to it, I really enjoyed listening to the simplicity of the arrangement. I'm attracted to it. Because it's simple, her singing voice resonates very much.

== Promotion ==
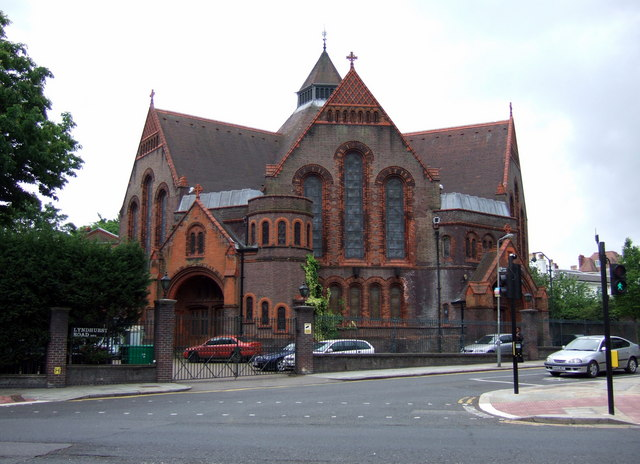
The music video was shot at Air Studios in Hampstead, London

The music video for "Kimi ni Muchū" premiered on YouTube on December 9, 2021, the 23rd anniversary of their debut in Japan. The video uses part of the performance and behind-the-scenes clips from their online concert "Hikaru Utada Live Sessions from Air Studios" in London, England, which was made available on the release day of Bad Mode on January 19, 2022.

== Track listing ==
Digital download / streaming

1. "Kimi ni Muchū" (君に夢中) — 5:54

== Credits and personnel ==
Credits adapted from an E-ontokyo press release.

- Hikaru Utada – songwriting, production, full vocals, keyboards and programming, vocal recording
- A. G. Cook – production, programming
- Steve Fitzmaurice – mixing (at Pierce House, London)
- Yuya Saito – vocal track editor (at ABS Recording, Tokyo)
- Jody Millina – bass synth

== Charts ==
=== Weekly charts ===
Weekly chart performance for "Kimi ni Muchū"
Chart (2021)	Peak position
Global 200 (Billboard)	55
Japan Combined Singles (Oricon)	6
Japan (Japan Hot 100)	2
US World Digital Song Sales (Billboard)	14

=== Year-end charts ===
Year-end chart performance for "Kimi ni Muchū"
Chart (2022)	Position
Japan (Japan Hot 100)	64

== Sales and certifications ==
Region	Certification	Certified units/sales
Japan (RIAJ)	Gold	128,390
Streaming
Japan (RIAJ)	Gold	50,000,000^{†}
^{†} Streaming-only figures based on certification alone.
