= Play a Love Song =

2018 single by Hikaru Utada

Single by Hikaru Utada

from the album Hatsukoi
- Language: Japanese
- Released: April 25, 2018
- Recorded: March 2018
- Genre: J-pop; disco
- Length: 4:14
- Label: Epic; Sony Music Japan
- Songwriter: Hikaru Utada
- Producer: Hikaru Utada

Hikaru Utada singles chronology
| "Lonely One" (2018) | "Play a Love Song" (2018) | "Hatsukoi" (2018) |

"Play a Love Song" is a song by Japanese-American singer-songwriter Hikaru Utada. It is their fourth single under the label Epic Records Japan, from their tenth studio album Hatsukoi. The song was released as a digital download on April 25, 2018 and was being used as a tie-in for Tennensui Suntory Water.

== Commercial performance ==
On April 25, the first day of its chart run on the Oricon Digital Download Songs Chart, it debuted at #1 with 13,713 copies. On the two days, it remained at the #1 position, selling 5,721 and 4,921 copies respectively. The song reached #1 in 5 domestic services and #1 in iTunes in 6 international countries around Asia, such as the Philippines and Taiwan.

== Track listing ==
All lyrics are written by Hikaru Utada; all music is composed by Hikaru Utada.

Digital version
| No. | Title | Length |
|---|---|---|
| 1. | "Play a Love Song" | 4:14 |

== Charts ==
=== Weekly charts ===
| Chart (2018) | Peak position |
|---|---|
| Billboard Japan Hot 100 | 4 |
| Billboard Japan Download Songs | 1 |
| Oricon Digital Download Songs | 1 |

=== Sales and certifications ===
| Chart | Amount |
|---|---|
| RIAJ digital downloads | 113,723 (Gold) |

== Release history ==
| Region | Date | Format |
|---|---|---|
| Worldwide | April 25, 2018 | Digital download |
