= First Love (Hikaru Utada song) =

1999 single by Hikaru Utada

- 12cm single cover

Single by Hikaru Utada

from the album First Love
- Language: Japanese, English
- Released: April 28, 1999
- Recorded: 1998
- Genre: J-pop; R&B
- Length: 4:18
- Label: Toshiba-EMI
- Songwriter: Hikaru Utada
- Producer: Akira Miyake Utada Sking Teruzane

Hikaru Utada singles chronology
"Movin' on Without You" (1999)	"First Love" (1999)	"Addicted to You" (1999)

Alternative cover
- 8cm edition

Music video
- "First Love" on YouTube

"First Love" is a song by Japanese-American singer-songwriter Hikaru Utada. It was released on April 28, 1999, as the third single from their second studio album, First Love, which was issued a month previously. It was released in two formats: an 8 cm mini CD and 12 cm standard CD both featuring different mixes.

Musically, "First Love" is a mid-tempo power ballad that blends elements of R&B, pop, and soul, showcasing Utada's signature style of emotional vulnerability paired with Western-influenced production. The arrangement features soft piano melodies, subtle string accompaniments, and a laid-back rhythm section. Lyrically, the song explores the bittersweet emotions of a first romantic experience, focusing on themes of longing, nostalgia, and unforgettable love.

Commercially, "First Love" experienced success in Japan. The 8 cm CD single edition reached number six on the Oricon Singles Chart and sold over 303,000 units there. Meanwhile, the 12 cm CD single edition peaked at number two and sold over half a million units, tallying over 800,000 copies in Japan; It was certified double platinum for 800,000 copies shipped to stores in Japan. "First Love" was also the best-performing single in Taiwan for 1999. The song was later covered by various artists and featured in multiple television dramas, such as Majo no Jōken. It was also used as the entrance march for the opening ceremony of the Spring 2000 National High School Baseball Tournament. Utada has performed the song on several of her concert tours.

In 2022, "First Love" gained renewed attention through its inclusion in the Netflix series First Love, which was inspired by Utada's songs "First Love" and "Hatsukoi."

== Background and composition ==
"First Love (song)"
A 25-second sample of "First Love." Musically, "First Love" is a power ballad that speaks of romance and nostalgia

In March 1999, Hikaru Utada released their highly anticipated debut Japanese album First Love. The album recorded the highest sales of any album in Japan with sales of eight million copies and made Hikaru Utada's name known worldwide. To further accelerate the album's momentum, its title track was re-released as a single on April 28, 1999, due to its popularity. This led to increased exposure on TV and radio, further expanding the album's recognition.

"First Love" is a power ballad that incorporates piano, bass, drums, guitars and synthesizers. The title "First Love" has a dual meaning: "first love" and "the love that could not be the last." Lyrically, the song speaks about cherishing the powerful and unforgettable memories of a first love, even after years have passed and circumstances have changed. The song is written in the key of G major with a common time tempo of 180 beats per minute.

== Critical reception ==
Since its release, "First Love" has received positive reviews from music critics. Kano, writing for Rockin'on Japan magazine, examined the single's raw emotions and described it as "heartbreaking." While reviewing their greatest hits album Utada Hikaru Single Collection Vol.1 (2004), Satoshi Shimada of Yeah!! J-Pop! and Kanako Hayakawa from Shinko Music both felt it was one of the strongest hits from the collection. OKMusic's Tomoyuki Hokari praised the lyrics on the song such as the famous line: "Our last kiss had the flavor of tobacco." In a 2009 survey by Oricon, asking respondents what song they wanted to hear with a broken heart, "First Love" was voted in the top 10.

== Commercial performance ==
Commercially, "First Love" was a success. The 12 cm edition of the single debuted at number two on the Oricon Singles Chart with 196,850 copies sold in its first week. The 8 cm edition debuted at number seven with 68,040 copies sold in its first week; the following week it would peak at number six with 62,700 copies sold. The 12 cm disc was ranked as the 42nd best-selling single of 1999 in Japan, while the 8 cm disc was ranked as the 72nd. Combining the sales of both versions, the single had 804,320 sales, which would have made it the 18th best-selling single for 1999. The song was also highly successful in Taiwan, peaking at number one on the singles chart. At the end of the year, "First Love" became the annual number one song on Taiwan's Hit FM Top 100 Singles of the Year chart for 1999. "First Love" was certified double platinum for 800,000 copies shipped to stores by the Recording Industry Association of Japan (RIAJ).

== Promotion ==
The music video for "First Love" is set in a dimly lit lounge or nightclub. The video follows Utada as they sit alone at a small table, lost in thought. The subdued lighting and quiet ambiance reflect the emotional tone of the song—a bittersweet reflection on a past relationship. As they sing, the camera lingers on their face, capturing subtle expressions of longing and vulnerability.

The song was used as the theme song for the Japanese drama Majo no Jōken, starring Hideaki Takizawa and Nanako Matsushima. "First Love" is featured in the PlayStation 2 rhythm game Unison, released in 2001. It was also adopted as the marching song for the Spring 2000 National High School Baseball Tournament. Utada performed "First Love" during their 2010 tour, Utada: In the Flesh 2010. It was also performed during Utada's two-date concert series Wild Life in December 2010. "First Love" and "Hatsukoi" from their 2018 studio album of the same name inspired the 2022 Netflix series First Love. On December 9, 2022, "First Love" was remixed alongside "Hatsukoi" in Dolby Atmos.

== Track listing ==
8cm version
No.	Title	Arrangement	Length
1.	"First Love"	Kei Kawano	4:18
2.	"First Love" (Strings Mix)	Kawano	4:22
3.	"First Love" (Original Karaoke)	Kawano	4:21
4.	"First Love" (John Luongo Mix)	John Luongo	4:08
Total length:			17:09

12cm version
No.	Title	Arrangement	Length
1.	"First Love"	Kawano	4:18
2.	"First Love" (featuring David Sanborn)	Kawano	4:17
3.	"First Love" (Strings Mix)	Kawano	4:20
4.	"First Love" (John Luongo Mix)	Luongo	4:08
Total length:			17:13

== Personnel ==
- Hironori Akiyama – guitar
- Yuichiro Goto – strings
- Takahiro Iida – synthesizer programming
- Kei Kawano – arrangement, string arrangement, keyboards, programming
- Masayuki Momo – synthesizer programming
- Hikaru Utada – lyrics, music, vocals
- Goh Hotoda - mixing engineer

== Charts ==
=== Weekly charts ===
1999 chart performance for "First Love"
Chart (1999)	Peak position
Japan (Oricon) (12cm)	2
Japan (Oricon) (8cm)	6
Taiwan (IFPI Taiwan)	1

2009 chart performance for "First Love"
Chart (2009)	Peak position
Japan (RIAJ Digital Track Chart)	89

2014 chart performance for "First Love"
Chart (2014)	Peak position
Japan (Japan Hot 100)	56

2022 chart performance for "First Love"
Chart (2022)	Peak position
Global 200 (Billboard)	147
Hong Kong (Billboard)	2
Japan (Japan Hot 100)	5
Japan (Oricon) with "Hatsukoi"	6
Japan Combined Singles (Oricon)	11
Japan Combined Singles (Oricon) with "Hatsukoi"	27
Singapore Regional (RIAS)	17
Taiwan (Billboard)	1

=== Year-end charts ===
1999 year-end chart performance for "First Love"
Chart (1999)	Peak position
Japan Singles (Oricon)(12cm)	42
Japan Singles (Oricon)(8cm)	72

2023 year-end chart performance for "First Love"
Chart (2023)	Position
Japan (Japan Hot 100)	45

2024 year-end chart performance for "First Love"
Chart (2024)	Position
Japan (Japan Hot 100)	81

== Certifications and sales ==
Certifications and sales for "First Love"
Region	Certification	Certified units/sales
Japan (RIAJ) 12 cm version	2× Platinum	500,000^{^}
Japan 8 cm version	—	303,000
Japan (RIAJ) Full-length Ringtone	Platinum	250,000^{*}
Streaming
Japan (RIAJ)	2× Platinum	200,000,000^{†}
Japan (RIAJ) 2014 Remaster	Gold	50,000,000^{†}
Japan (RIAJ) 2022 Mix	Gold	50,000,000^{†}
^{*} Sales figures based on certification alone.^{^} Shipments figures based on certification alone.^{†} Streaming-only figures based on certification alone.

== Release history ==
Release history and formats for "First Love"
Region	Date	Format(s)	Version	Label	Ref.
Japan	April 28, 1999	CD	Original	Toshiba-EMI	
Taiwan	August 2000	CD	Original	EMI	
Japan	November 19, 2004	Digital download	Original	Toshiba-EMI	
Various	December 9, 2022	Digital download; streaming	2022 Mix	USM Japan	
Japan	December 9, 2022	Vinyl	"First Love / Hatsukoi" 2022 Remastered	USM Japan; Epic	

== Juju version ==
"First Love"

Promotional single by Juju

from the album Request
- Released: September 15, 2010
- Genre: J-pop, R&B
- Length: 4:27
- Label: Sony
- Songwriter: Hikaru Utada
- Producer: Akihisa Matsuura

"First Love" was covered by the Japanese R&B singer Juju in 2010, on her cover album Request. It was the main promotional single, and was released as a digital download to cellphones on September 15, 2010. Juju performed the song at Hey! Hey! Hey! on September 20.

=== Charts ===
Chart	Peak position
RIAJ Digital Track Chart Top 100	5

=== Release history ===
Region	Date	Format
Japan	September 8, 2010	Ringtone
Japan	September 15, 2010	Cellphone download

== Other cover versions ==
- Naoko Terai (1999, violin, album Pure Moment)
- Sotte Bosse (2007, on the album Innocent View)
- Scott Murphy (2008, on the album Guilty Pleasures 3)
- Ryō Nagano (Apogee) (2008, digital single)
- Yasushi Nakanishi (2008, on the album Standards 3)
- Jake Shimabukuro (2008, ukulele solo, DVD Ichigo Ichie)
- Makoto Hirahara (2009, saxophone, on the album Vocalese)
- Sing-O (2009, digital single)
- Starving Trancer feat. Maki (2009, on the album Exit Trance Presents Dramatic Trance Memorial Daiichiwa)
- Hideaki Tokunaga (2010, on the album Vocalist 4)
- Eric Martin (2010, on the album Mr. Vocalist 3)
- Boyz II Men (2010 on the album Covered: Winter)
- May J. (2013, on the album Summer Ballad Covers)
