= Eternally (Hikaru Utada song) =

Song by Hikaru Utada

from the album Distance
- Released: March 10, 2008
- Recorded: 2000
- Genre: J-pop
- Length: 4:45; 4:49 (Drama Mix)
- Label: EMI Music Japan
- Songwriter: Hikaru Utada
- Producers: Shinichirō Murayama; Kei Kawano (strings)

"Eternally" is a song by Japanese-American musician Hikaru Utada, from their third studio album Distance. It was re-arranged in 2008 as "Eternally (Drama Mix)" for use in the Maki Horikita starring Fuji TV drama Innocent Love. It was released as a digital single on October 31, 2008, and eventually released onto CD in March 2009, on an EMI compilation album I: Zutto, Zutto, Aishiteru (i(アイ)～ずっと、ずっと、愛してる～).

Innocent Love director Toshiyuki Nakano originally decided that Utada's voice would suit the themes of the drama well. Hearing "Eternally", he felt the song was a perfect choice for the drama, as the song's melody, lyrics and title fitted, in his opinion, as if the song had been specifically commissioned for the drama.

== Writing ==
The song is a R&B ballad featuring an arrangement of strings, background percussion and guitar. The lyrics describe a person addressing their lover, describing how much they treasure a single moment they are sharing with this person. They believe that even if they cannot stay with their lover forever, at least "the feeling (they) have now will last forever" (今の気持ちだけはずっと永遠, ima no kimochi dake wa zutto eien).

The drama mix of the song features a different take of Utada's vocals during the recording sessions of Distance in 2001, however it was given a new mix in 2008. The new version is very similar in structure to the original, however with more prominent strings during the chorus.

== Charts ==
Chart	Peak position
Billboard Japan Hot 100: Drama Mix	36
RIAJ Reco-kyō ringtones Top 100	50
RIAJ Reco-kyō ringtones Top 100: Drama Mix	7

== Certifications ==
Chart	Amount
RIAJ full-length cellphone downloads	100,000+
RIAJ full-length cellphone downloads: Drama Mix	100,000+
RIAJ PC downloads: Drama Mix	100,000+

== Release history ==
"Eternally"
A sample from the chorus of the original version.

"Eternally (Drama Mix)"
A sample from the version used for Innocent Love.

Region	Date	Format
Japan	March 10, 2008	Digital download (original version)
Japan	March 31, 2008	Digital download (Drama Mix)
