= List of songs recorded by Hikaru Utada =

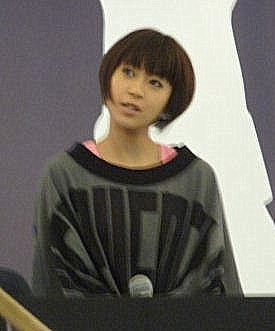
Utada Hikaru

Japanese-American singer-songwriter Utada Hikaru has recorded both Japanese and English songs for a total of 8 studio albums (5 Japanese, 3 English), 3 compilation albums and guest features in both other artist's singles and albums.

== List of recorded songs ==
Key
†	Indicates single release
#	Indicates promotional single release

Song	Artist(s)	Writer(s)	Album(s)	Year	Language(s)	Ref.
"100 Reasons Why"	Utada Hikaru	Utada Hikaru; Charlene Harrison	Precious	1998	English	
"A.S.A.P."	Utada Hikaru	Utada Hikaru	Deep River	2002	Japanese	
"About Me"	Utada Hikaru	Utada Hikaru	Exodus	2004	English	
"Addicted to You" †	Utada Hikaru	Utada Hikaru	Distance	2001	Japanese	
"Amai Wana: Paint It, Black (甘いワナ～: Paint It, Black); Sweet Trap: Paint It, Black)"	Utada Hikaru	Utada Hikaru	First Love	1999	Japanese	
"Anata" † (あなた; You)	Utada Hikaru	Utada Hikaru	Hatsukoi	2018	Japanese	
"Animato"	Utada Hikaru	Utada Hikaru	Exodus	2004	English	
"Apple and Cinnamon"	Utada Hikaru	Utada Hikaru	This Is the One	2009	English	
"Arashi no Megami# (嵐の女神; Storm Goddess)"	Utada Hikaru	Utada Hikaru	Utada Hikaru Single Collection Vol. 2	2010	Japanese	
"Another Chance"	Utada Hikaru	Utada Hikaru	First Love	1999	Japanese	
"Automatic" †	Utada Hikaru	Utada Hikaru	First Love	1999	Japanese	
"Automatic Part II"	Utada Hikaru	Utada Hikaru	This Is the One	2009	English	
"B&C"	Utada Hikaru	Utada Hikaru	First Love	1999	Japanese	
"Baddo Mōdo" # (Badモード; Bad Mode)	Utada Hikaru	Utada Hikaru; Jodi Milliner	Bad Mode	2022	Japanese	
"Be My Last" †	Utada Hikaru	Utada Hikaru	Ultra Blue	2006	Japanese	
"Beautiful World" †	Utada Hikaru	Utada Hikaru	Heart Station	2008	Japanese	
"Beautiful World (Da Capo Version)"	Utada Hikaru	Utada Hikaru	Bad Mode	2022	Japanese	
"Blow My Whistle"	Utada Hikaru featuring Foxy Brown	The Neptunes; Utada Hikaru	Rush Hour 2: Soundtrack	2001	English	
"Blue"	Utada Hikaru	Utada Hikaru	Ultra Blue	2008	Japanese	
"Boku wa Kuma † (ぼくはくま; I'm a Bear)	Utada Hikaru	Utada Hikaru	Heart Station	2008	Japanese	
"Bōkyaku" # (忘却; Forgotten)	Utada Hikaru featuring KOHH	Utada Hikaru; KOHH	Fantôme	2016	Japanese	
"Bridge (Interlude)"	Utada Hikaru	Utada Hikaru	Deep River	2002		
"By Your Side"	Utada Hikaru featuring Kiley Dean	Utada Hikaru; Timbaland	Unity - The Official Athens 2004 Olympic Games Album	2004	English	
"Can You Keep a Secret?" †	Utada Hikaru	Utada Hikaru	Distance	2001	Japanese	
"Can't Wait 'Til Christmas" #	Utada Hikaru	Utada Hikaru	Utada Hikaru Single Collection Vol. 2	2010	Japanese	
"Celebrate"	Utada Hikaru	Utada Hikaru	Heart Station	2008	Japanese	
"Chikai" † (誓い; Oath)	Utada Hikaru	Utada Hikaru	Hatsukoi	2018	Japanese	
"Close to You" †	Utada Hikaru	Burt Bacharach; Hal David	Precious	1998	English	
"Colors" †	Utada Hikaru	Utada Hikaru	Ultra Blue	2006	Japanese	
"Come Back to Me" †	Utada Hikaru	Utada Hikaru	This Is the One	2009	English	
"Crossover Interlude"	Utada Hikaru	Utada Hikaru	Exodus	2004	English	
"Dareka no Negai ga Kanau Koro" † (誰かの願いが叶うころ; When Someone's Wish Comes True)	Utada Hikaru	Utada Hikaru	Ultra Blue	2006	Japanese	
"Dare Nimo Iwanai" (誰にも言わない; Don't Tell Anyone)	Utada Hikaru	Utada Hikaru	Bad Mode	2022	Japanese	
"Deep River" #	Utada Hikaru	Utada Hikaru	Deep River	2002	Japanese	
"Devil Inside" †	Utada Hikaru	Utada Hikaru	Exodus	2004	English	
"Dirty Desire" #	Utada Hikaru	Utada Hikaru	This Is the One	2009	English	
"Distance"	Utada Hikaru	Utada Hikaru	Distance	2001	Japanese	
"Do You" †	Ne-Yo featuring Utada	Shaffer Smith; Melvin Sparkman; Marcus Allen	Ne-Yo: The Collection	2007	English	
"Dorama" (ドラマ; Drama)	Utada Hikaru	Utada Hikaru	Distance	2001	Japanese	
"Easy Breezy" †	Utada Hikaru	Utada Hikaru	Exodus	2004	English	
"Eclipse (Interlude)"	Utada Hikaru	Utada Hikaru	Ultra Blue	2006		
"Eternally" #	Utada Hikaru	Utada Hikaru	Distance	2001	Japanese	
"Exodus '04 †	Utada Hikaru	Utada Hikaru; Timbaland	Exodus	2004	English	
"Face My Fears (English Version)" †	Utada Hikaru	Utada Hikaru; Skrillex; Jason "Poo Bear" Boyd	Bad Mode	2022	English	
"Face My Fears (Japanese Version)" †	Utada Hikaru	Utada Hikaru; Skrillex; Jason "Poo Bear" Boyd	Bad Mode	2022	Japanese	
"Fight the Blues" †	Utada Hikaru	Utada Hikaru	Heart Station	2008	Japanese	
"Final Distance" †	Utada Hikaru	Utada Hikaru	Deep River	2002	Japanese	
"Find Love"	Utada Hikaru	Utada Hikaru	Bad Mode	2022	English	
"First Love" †	Utada Hikaru	Utada Hikaru	First Love	1999	Japanese	
"Flavor of Life" †	Utada Hikaru	Utada Hikaru	Heart Station	2008	Japanese	
"Flavor of Life (Ballad Version)"	Utada Hikaru	Utada Hikaru	Heart Station	2008	Japanese	
"Fly Me to the Moon (In Other Words)"	Utada Hikaru	Bart Howard	Non-album	2000	English	
"For You" †	Utada Hikaru	Utada Hikaru	Distance	2001	Japanese	
"Forevermore" †	Utada Hikaru	Utada Hikaru	Hatsukoi	2018	Japanese	
"Gentle Beast Interlude"	Utada Hikaru	Utada Hikaru	Heart Station	2008		
"Give Me a Reason"	Utada Hikaru	Utada Hikaru	First Love	1999	Japanese	
"Gold -Mata Au Hi Made-" † (Gold 〜また逢う日まで〜; Gold -Until the Day We Meet Again)	Utada Hikaru	Utada Hikaru	Non-album	2023	Japanese	
"Good Night"	Utada Hikaru	Utada Hikaru	Hatsukoi	2018	Japanese	
"Goodbye Happiness" †	Utada Hikaru	Utada Hikaru	Utada Hikaru Single Collection Vol. 2	2010	Japanese	
"Hanataba o Kimi ni" † (花束を君に; A Bouquet of Flowers for You)	Utada Hikaru	Utada Hikaru	Fantôme	2016	Japanese	
"Hatsukoi" † (初恋; First Love)	Utada Hikaru	Utada Hikaru	Hatsukoi	2018	Japanese	
"Hayatochi-Remix" (早とちリミックス; Jumping to Conclusions-Remix)	Utada Hikaru	Utada Hikaru	Distance	2001	Japanese	
"Heart Station" †	Utada Hikaru	Utada Hikaru	Heart Station	2008	Japanese	
"Here and There and Back Again"	Utada Hikaru	Utada Hikaru; Charlene Harrison	Precious	1998	English	
"Hikari" † (光; Light)	Utada Hikaru	Utada Hikaru	Deep River	2002	Japanese	
"Hotel Lobby"	Utada Hikaru	Utada Hikaru	Exodus	2004	English	
"How Ya Doin'"	Utada Hikaru	Utada Hikaru; Charlene Harrison	Precious	1998	English	
"Hymne à l'amour (Ai no Anthem)" † (Hymne à l'amour (愛のアンセム); Hymn of Love (Anthem of Love) (French/Japanese)	Utada Hikaru	Utada Hikaru	Utada Hikaru Single Collection Vol. 2	2010	French/Japanese	
"I Don't Love You"	Utada Hikaru	Utada Hikaru; Charlene Harrison	Precious	1998	English	
"I Won't Last a Day Without You"	Sheena Ringo featuring Utada Hikaru	Roger Nichols; Paul Williams	Utaite Myouri ~Sono Ichi~ (唄ひ手冥利 ～其ノ壱～; Singer's Luck ~Part One~)	2002	English	
"In My Room"	Utada Hikaru	Utada Hikaru	First Love	1999	Japanese	
"Interlude"	Utada Hikaru	Utada Hikaru	First Love	1999	Japanese	
"Jinsei Saikō no Hi" (人生最高の日; The Best Day of My Life)	Utada Hikaru	Utada Hikaru	Fantôme	2016	Japanese	
"Kairo" (海路; Sea Route)	Utada Hikaru	Utada Hikaru	Ultra Blue	2006	Japanese	
"Keep Tryin'" †	Utada Hikaru	Utada Hikaru	Ultra Blue	2006	Japanese	
"Kettobase!" (蹴っ飛ばせ!; Kick It!)	Utada Hikaru	Utada Hikaru	Distance	2001	Japanese	
"Kimi ni Muchū" (君に夢中; I'm Crazy About You) †	Utada Hikaru	Utada Hikaru	Bad Mode	2022	Japanese	
"Kibunja Naino" (気分じゃないの; Not in the Mood)	Utada Hikaru	Utada Hikaru	Bad Mode	2022	Japanese	
"Kirei na Hito" (キレイな人; Find Love)	Utada Hikaru	Utada Hikaru	Bad Mode	2022	Japanese	
"Kiss & Cry" †	Utada Hikaru	Utada Hikaru	Heart Station	2008	Japanese	
"Kotoba ni Naranai Kimochi" (言葉にならない気持ち; Indescribable Feelings)	Utada Hikaru	Utada Hikaru	Distance	2001	Japanese	
"Kōya no Ōkami" (荒野の狼; Wolf in the Wilderness)	Utada Hikaru	Utada Hikaru	Fantôme	2016	Japanese	
"Kremlin Dusk"	Utada Hikaru	Utada Hikaru	Exodus	2004	English	
"Let Me Give You My Love"	Utada Hikaru	Utada Hikaru; Timbaland	Exodus	2004	English	
"Sakura Drops/Letters" †	Utada Hikaru	Utada Hikaru	Deep River	2002	Japanese	
"Manatsu no Tōriame" † (真夏の通り雨; Midsummer Showers)	Utada Hikaru	Utada Hikaru	Fantôme	2016	Japanese	
"Lullaby"	Utada Hikaru	Utada Hikaru, Charlene Harrison	Precious	1998	English	
"Me Muero"	Utada Hikaru	Utada Hikaru	This Is the One	2009	English	
"Merry Christmas Mr. Lawrence - FYI"	Utada Hikaru	Utada Hikaru	This Is the One	2009	English	
"Michi" † (道; Road)	Utada Hikaru	Utada Hikaru	Fantôme	2016	Japanese	
"Movin' on Without You" †	Utada Hikaru	Utada Hikaru	First Love	1999	Japanese	
"My Little Lover Boy"	Utada Hikaru	Utada Hikaru; Charlene Harrison	Precious	1998	English	
"Never Let Go"	Utada Hikaru	Utada Hikaru	First Love	1999	Japanese	
"Nichiyo no Asa" (日曜の朝;Sunday Morning)	Utada Hikaru	Utada Hikaru	Ultra Blue	2006	Japanese	
"Niji-iro Basu" (虹色バス; Rainbow-colored Bus)	Utada Hikaru	Utada Hikaru	Heart Station	2008	Japanese	
"Nijikan Dake no Vacance" # (二時間だけのバカンス; A Two Hour Vacation)	Utada Hikaru featuring Sheena Ringo	Utada Hikaru	Fantôme	2016	Japanese	
"Ningyo" (人魚; Mermaid)	Utada Hikaru	Utada Hikaru	Fantôme	2016	Japanese	
"Nokoriga" (残り香; Remaining Scent)	Utada Hikaru	Utada Hikaru	Hatsukoi	2018	Japanese	
"On and On"	Utada Hikaru	Utada Hikaru	This Is the One	2009	English	
"One Last Kiss" †	Utada Hikaru	Utada Hikaru	Bad Mode	2022	Japanese	
"One Night Magic"	Utada Hikaru featuring Yamada Masashi (of The Back Horn)	Utada Hikaru	Ultra Blue	2006	Japanese	
"Opening"	Utada Hikaru	Utada Hikaru	Exodus	2004	English	
"Ore no Kanojo" (俺の彼女;My Girlfriend)	Utada Hikaru	Utada Hikaru	Fantôme	2016	Japanese	
"Ōzora de Dakishimete" † (大空で抱きしめて;Embrace Me Under the Big Sky)	Utada Hikaru	Utada Hikaru	Hatsukoi	2018	Japanese	
"Parody"	Utada Hikaru	Utada Hikaru	Distance	2001	Japanese	
"Passion" †	Utada Hikaru	Utada Hikaru	Ultra Blue	2006	Japanese	
"Phakchi no Uta" (クチーの唄; Coriander Song)	Utada Hikaru	Utada Hikaru	Hatsukoi	2018	Japanese	
"Pink Blood"	Utada Hikaru	Utada Hikaru	Bad Mode	2022	Japanese	
"Play a Love Song" †	Utada Hikaru	Utada Hikaru	Hatsukoi	2018	Japanese	
"Poppin'"	Utada Hikaru	Utada Hikaru	This Is the One	2009	English	
"Precious Love"	Utada Hikaru	Utada Hikaru; Charlene Harrison	Precious	1998	English	
"Promise"	Utada Hikaru	Utada Hikaru; Charlene Harrison	Precious	1998	English	
"Purei Bōru" (プレイ・ボール; Play Ball)	Utada Hikaru	Utada Hikaru	Deep River	2002	Japanese	
"Prisoner of Love" †	Utada Hikaru	Utada Hikaru	Heart Station	2008	Japanese	
"Prisoner of Love (Quiet Version)"	Utada Hikaru	Utada Hikaru	Non-album	2008	Japanese	
"Sanctuary (Closing)" †	Utada Hikaru	Utada Hikaru	This Is the One	2009	English	
"Sanctuary (Opening)" †	Utada Hikaru	Utada Hikaru	This Is the One	2009	English	
"Sakura Doroppusu" † (Sakuraドロップス; Sakura Drops)	Utada Hikaru	Utada Hikaru	Deep River	2002	Japanese	
"Sakura Nagashi" † (桜流し; Flowing Cherry Blossoms)	Utada Hikaru	Utada Hikaru	Fantôme	2012	Japanese	
"Shiawase ni Narō" (幸せになろう;Let's Be Happy)	Utada Hikaru	Utada Hikaru	Deep River	2002	Japanese	
"Shittosarerubeki Jinsei" (嫉妬されるべき人生; A Life to Be Envied)	Utada Hikaru	Utada Hikaru	Hatsukoi	2018	Japanese	
"Show Me Love (Not a Dream)" †	Utada Hikaru	Utada Hikaru	Utada Hikaru Single Collection Vol. 2	2010	Japanese	
"Simple and Clean"	Utada Hikaru	Utada Hikaru	This Is the One	2009	English	
"Somewhere Near Marseilles"	Utada Hikaru	Utada Hikaru	Bad Mode	2022	English	
"Stay Gold" †	Utada Hikaru	Utada Hikaru	Heart Station	2008	Japanese	
"Sangurasu" (サングラス; Sunglasses)	Utada Hikaru	Utada Hikaru	Distance	2001	Japanese	
"Take a Little While"	Utada Hikaru	Utada Hikaru; Charlene Harrison	Precious	1998	English	
"Taking My Money Back"	Utada Hikaru	Utada Hikaru	This Is the One	2009	English	
"Teiku 5" (テイク 5; Take 5)	Utada Hikaru	Utada Hikaru	Heart Station	2008	Japanese	
"The Workout"	Utada Hikaru	Utada Hikaru	Exodus	2004	English	
"This Is Love" †	Utada Hikaru	Utada Hikaru	Ultra Blue	2006	Japanese	
"This One (Crying Like a Child)"	Utada Hikaru	Utada Hikaru	This Is the One	2009	English	
"Ticket 4 Two"	Utada Hikaru	Utada Hikaru; Charlene Harrison	Precious	1998	English	
"Time" †	Utada Hikaru	Utada Hikaru	Bad Mode	2022	Japanese	
"Time Limit" † (タイム・リミット Taimu Rimitto)	Utada Hikaru	Utada Hikaru	Distance	2001	Japanese	
"Time Will Tell" †	Utada Hikaru	Utada Hikaru	First Love	1999	Japanese	
"Tippy Toe"	Utada Hikaru	Utada Hikaru	Exodus	2004	English	
"Tokyo Nights" (東京NIGHTS; Tokyo Nights)	Utada Hikaru	Utada Hikaru	Deep River	2002	Japanese	
"Tomodachi" (ともだち; Friend)	Utada Hikaru	Utada Hikaru	Fantôme	2016	Japanese	
"Too Proud"	Utada Hikaru	Utada Hikaru	Hatsukoi	2018	Japanese	
"Traveling" †	Utada Hikaru	Utada Hikaru	Deep River	2002	Japanese	
"Uso Mitai na I Love You" (嘘みたいな I Love You; The Dubious I Love You)	Utada Hikaru	Utada Hikaru	Deep River	2002	Japanese	
"Wait & See (Risuku)" † (Wait & See (リスク); Wait & See (Risk))	Utada Hikaru	Utada Hikaru	Distance	2001	Japanese	
"Wings"	Utada Hikaru	Utada Hikaru	Ultra Blue	2006	Japanese	
"Wonder 'Bout"	Utada Hikaru	Utada Hikaru	Exodus	2004	English	
"Work Things Out"	Utada Hikaru	Utada Hikaru; Charlene Harrison	Precious	1998	English	
"You Make Me Want to Be a Man" †	Utada Hikaru	Utada Hikaru	Exodus	2004	English	
"Yūnagi" (夕凪; Evening Calm)	Utada Hikaru	Utada Hikaru	Hatsukoi	2018	Japanese	
