= List of awards and nominations received by Hikaru Utada =

Hikaru Utada awards and nominations
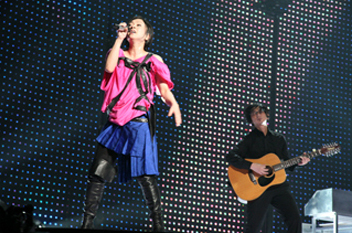
- Utada performing in 2006
Awards and nominations
Award	Wins	Nominations

Totals (Note: Certain award groups do not simply award one winner. They acknowledge several different recipients, have runners-up, and have third place. Since this is a specific recognition and is different from losing an award, runner-up mentions are considered wins in this award tally. For simplification and to avoid errors, each award in this list has been presumed to have had a prior nomination.)
- Wins: 104
- Nominations: 122

This is the list of awards received by Hikaru Utada, a Japanese singer-songwriter. They have won numerous awards, including thirty-nine Japan Gold Disc Awards (the third most out of any artist in the event's history), five Japan Record Awards, six awards from MTV Video Music Awards Japan, and eight Japan Record Sales Awards.

== Awards and nominations ==
Award ceremony	Year	Category	Nominee / work	Result	Ref.
Music Pen Club Japan	2019	Popular Category/Best Album	Hatsukoi	Won	
Asian Pop Music Awards	2022	Top 20 Albums – Overseas	Bad Mode	Won	
Asian Pop Music Awards	2022	Album of the Year – Overseas	Bad Mode	Nominated	
Asian Pop Music Awards	2022	Best Female Singer – Overseas	Hikaru Utada	Nominated	
Asian Pop Music Awards	2022	Best Producer – Overseas	Hikaru Utada	Nominated	
Asian Pop Music Awards	2022	Best Music Video – Overseas	"Pink Blood"	Nominated	
Association of Media in Digital Awards	2004	Best Music Composer	UH Live Streaming 20-dai wa Ikeike!	Won	
Billboard Japan Music Awards	2013	Outstanding Anime Song Artist Award	Hikaru Utada	Nominated	
Billboard Japan Music Awards	2016	Top Hot Albums	Fantôme	Won	
CD Shop Awards	2009	Award	Heart Station	Won	
CD Shop Awards	2017	Grand Prix	Fantôme	Won	
CD Shop Awards	2019	Award	Hatsukoi	Won	
French J-Awards	2008	Best Japanese Single – Female	"Prisoner of Love"	Won	
Japan Blu-ray Awards	2020	Music Award	Hikaru Utada Laughter in the Dark Tour 2018	Won	
Japan Cable Awards	1999	Special Award	Hikaru Utada	Won	
JFN Listener's Awards	1999	Grand Prix	Hikaru Utada	Won	
JFN Listener's Awards	1999	Best Artist Award	Hikaru Utada	Won	
JFN Listener's Awards	1999	Best Album	First Love	Won	
Japan Gold Disc Awards	2000	Artist of the Year	Hikaru Utada	Won	
Japan Gold Disc Awards	2000	Song of the Year	"Automatic"	Won	
Japan Gold Disc Awards	2000	Song of the Year	"Movin' on Without You"	Won	
Japan Gold Disc Awards	2000	Song of the Year	"Addicted to You"	Won	
Japan Gold Disc Awards	2000	Rock & Pop Album of the Year	First Love	Won	
Japan Gold Disc Awards	2000	Music Video of The Year	Single Clip Collection Vol.1	Won	
Japan Gold Disc Awards	2001	Song of the Year	"Wait & See (Risk)"	Won	
Japan Gold Disc Awards	2001	Song of the Year	"For You / Time Limit"	Won	
Japan Gold Disc Awards	2002	Song of the Year	"Can You Keep a Secret?"	Won	
Japan Gold Disc Awards	2002	Song of the Year	"Traveling"	Won	
Japan Gold Disc Awards	2002	Rock & Pop Album of the Year	Distance	Won	
Japan Gold Disc Awards	2003	Artist of the Year	Hikaru Utada	Won	
Japan Gold Disc Awards	2003	Song of the Year	"Hikari"	Won	
Japan Gold Disc Awards	2003	Song of the Year	"Sakura Drops"	Won	
Japan Gold Disc Awards	2003	Song of the Year	"Colors"	Won	
Japan Gold Disc Awards	2003	Rock & Pop Album of the Year	Deep River	Won	
Japan Gold Disc Awards	2003	Music Video of the Year	"Traveling"	Won	
Japan Gold Disc Awards	2005	Song of the Year	"Darekano Negaiga Kanaukoro"	Won	
Japan Gold Disc Awards	2005	Rock & Pop Album of the Year	Utada Hikaru Single Collection Vol. 1	Won	
Japan Gold Disc Awards	2005	International Rock & Pop Album of the Year	Exodus	Won	
Japan Gold Disc Awards	2005	Music Video of the Year	Utada Hikaru in Budokan 2004 'Hikaru no 5'	Won	
Japan Gold Disc Awards	2006	Song of the Year	"Be My Last"	Won	
Japan Gold Disc Awards	2007	10 Best Albums	Ultra Blue	Won	
Japan Gold Disc Awards	2008	Single of the Year	"Flavor of Life"	Won	
Japan Gold Disc Awards	2008	Best 10 Singles	"Flavor of Life"	Won	
Japan Gold Disc Awards	2008	Best 5 Chaku-Uta Full Songs	"Flavor of Life"	Won	
Japan Gold Disc Awards	2008	PC Stream Song of the Year	"Flavor of Life"	Won	
Japan Gold Disc Awards	2008	Best 5 PC Streaming Songs	"Flavor of Life"	Won	
Japan Gold Disc Awards	2008	Best 5 PC Streaming Songs	"Beautiful World"	Won	
Japan Gold Disc Awards	2008	Best 5 Chaku-Uta Songs	"Flavor of Life" (Ballad ver.)	Won	
Japan Gold Disc Awards	2008	Best 5 Chaku-Uta Full Songs	"Flavor of Life" (Ballad ver.)	Won	
Japan Gold Disc Awards	2009	Best 5 Albums	Heart Station	Won	
Japan Gold Disc Awards	2009	Best 5 PC Streaming Songs	"Prisoner of Love"	Won	
Japan Gold Disc Awards	2009	Best 5 Chaku-Uta Songs	"Prisoner of Love"	Won	
Japan Gold Disc Awards	2009	Best 5 Chaku-Uta Full Songs	"Prisoner of Love"	Won	
Japan Gold Disc Awards	2017	Best 5 Albums	Fantôme	Won	
Japan Gold Disc Awards	2017	Best 5 Songs by Download	"Hanataba wo Kimi ni"	Won	
Japan Gold Disc Awards	2019	Best 5 Albums	Hatsukoi	Won	
Japan Gold Disc Awards	2019	Best 5 Songs by Download	"Hatsukoi"	Won	
Japan Record Awards	1999	Honorable Mention Songs	"Automatic"	Won	
Japan Record Awards	1999	Best Album Prize	First Love	Won	
Japan Record Awards	2016	Best Album Prize	Fantôme	Won	
Japan Record Awards	2016	Excellent Award	"Hanataba wo Kimi ni"	Won	
Japan Record Awards	2018	Excellent Album Award	Hatsukoi	Won	
Japan Record Sales Awards	1999	Artist Sales Award	Hikaru Utada	Won	
Japan Record Sales Awards	1999	Single Sales Award	Hikaru Utada	Won	
Japan Record Sales Awards	1999	Album Sales Grand Prize	Hikaru Utada	Won	
Japan Record Sales Awards	1999	Rookie Sales Award	Hikaru Utada	Won	
Japan Record Sales Awards	1999	Lyricist Sales Award	Hikaru Utada	Won	
Japan Record Sales Awards	2002	Artist Sales Award	Hikaru Utada	Won	
Japan Record Sales Awards	2002	Album Sales Grand Prize	Hikaru Utada	Won	
Japan Record Sales Awards	2002	Arranger Award	Hikaru Utada	Won	
JASRAC Awards	2000	Gold Award	"Automatic"	Won	
JASRAC Awards	2000	Silver Award	"Time Will Tell"	Won	
JASRAC Awards	2002	Silver Award	"Can You Keep a Secret?"	Won	
JASRAC Awards	2003	Silver Award	"Traveling"	Won	
JASRAC Awards	2003	Silver Award – Foreign Production	"Hikari"	Won	
JASRAC Awards	2009	10 Best Interactive Songs	"Prisoner of Love"	Won	
J-Wave Tokio Hot 100 Awards	2003	Best Female Artist	Hikaru Utada	Won	
J-Wave Tokio Hot 100 Awards	2011	Best Song	"Goodbye Happiness"	Won	
Lumiere Japan Awards	2019	Special Award	Hikaru Utada Laughter in the Dark Tour 2018	Won	
MTV Video Music Awards	2001	International Viewer's Choice: MTV Japan	"Can You Keep a Secret?"	Won	
MTV Asia Awards		Best Asian Artist	Hikaru Utada	Won	
MTV Video Music Awards Japan	2002	Best R&B Video	Hikaru Utada	Won	
MTV Video Music Awards Japan	2002	Video of the Year	"Traveling"	Nominated	
MTV Video Music Awards Japan	2002	Best Female Artist	Hikaru Utada	Nominated	
MTV Video Music Awards Japan	2003	Album of the Year	Deep River	Nominated	
MTV Video Music Awards Japan	2003	Video of the Year	"Sakura Drops"	Nominated	
MTV Video Music Awards Japan	2003	Best Female Video	"Sakura Drops"	Won	
MTV Video Music Awards Japan	2005	Best Female Video	"Easy Breezy"	Nominated	
MTV Video Music Awards Japan	2008	Best Video From a Film	"Beautiful World"	Won	
MTV Video Music Awards Japan	2009	Album of the Year	Heart Station	Nominated	
MTV Video Music Awards Japan	2009	Best Female Video	"Prisoner of Love"	Nominated	
MTV Video Music Awards Japan	2011	Video of the Year	"Goodbye Happiness"	Nominated	
MTV Video Music Awards Japan	2016	Best Video of the Year	"Manatsu no Tōriame"	Won	
MTV Video Music Awards Japan	2016	Best Female Video	"Manatsu no Tōriame"	Won	
MTV Video Music Awards Japan	2017	Best Collaboration Video	"Forgetting" featuring Kohh	Won	
MTV Video Music Awards Japan	2018	Best Album	Hatsukoi	Won	
RTHK International Pop Poll Awards	2008	Top Japanese Gold Songs	"Beautiful World"	Gold	
RTHK International Pop Poll Awards	2008	Top Japanese Artist	Hikaru Utada	Gold	
RTHK International Pop Poll Awards	2017	Top Japanese Gold Songs	"Nijikan Dake no Vacance"	Nominated	
RTHK International Pop Poll Awards	2017	Top Japanese Artist / Group	Hikaru Utada	Bronze	
RTHK International Pop Poll Awards	2017	Best Selling Album of the Year – Japan	Fantôme	Won	
RTHK International Pop Poll Awards	2018	Top Japanese Artist / Group	Hikaru Utada	Bronze	
Space Shower Music Awards	2002	Best Video of the Year	"Traveling"	Won	
Space Shower Music Awards	2002	Best Female Video	"Traveling"	Won	
Space Shower Music Awards	2002	Best Art Direction Video	"Traveling"	Won	
Space Shower Music Awards	2003	Best Female Video	"Sakura Drops"	Won	
Space Shower Music Awards	2007	Best Female Video	"Keep Tryin'"	Nominated	
Space Shower Music Awards	2008	Best Animated/CGI Video	"Kiss & Cry"	Nominated	
Space Shower Music Awards	2009	Best Female Video	"Heart Station"	Nominated	
Space Shower Music Awards	2010	Best Conceptual Video	"Goodbye Happiness"	Won	
Space Shower Music Awards	2010	Special Award	"Goodbye Happiness"	Won	
Space Shower Music Awards	2017	Best Female Artist	Hikaru Utada	Won	
Space Shower Music Awards	2017	Best New Vision Award	Hikaru Utada	Won	
Space Shower Music Awards	2018	Best Female Artist	Hikaru Utada	Nominated	
Space Shower Music Awards	2019	Best Female Artist	Hikaru Utada	Won	
Television Drama Academy Awards	1999	Drama Song Award	"First Love"	Won	
Television Drama Academy Awards	2001	Drama Song Award	"Can You Keep a Secret?"	Won	
Television Drama Academy Awards	2002	Drama Song Award	"Sakura Drops"	Won	
Television Drama Academy Awards	2008	Drama Song Award	"Prisoner of Love"	Won	
Television Drama Academy Awards	2016	Drama Song Award	"Hanataba wo Kimi ni"	Won	
World Music Awards	2000	Best-Selling Asian Artist	Hikaru Utada	Won	
World Music Awards	2004	Best-Selling Japanese Artist	Hikaru Utada	Won	
