= Stay Gold (Hikaru Utada song) =

- "Heart Station" / "Stay Gold" cover

Single by Hikaru Utada

from the album Heart Station
- Released: February 20, 2008
- Recorded: 2007
- Genre: Pop
- Length: 5:15
- Label: EMI Music Japan
- Songwriter: Hikaru Utada
- Producers: Hikaru Utada; Akira Miyake; Teruzane Utada

Hikaru Utada singles chronology
"Do You" (2007)	"Stay Gold" (2008)	"Heart Station" (2008)

"Stay Gold" is a pop song by Japanese-American musician Hikaru Utada. Used in a high-profile campaign for Kao Corporation's Asience shampoo commercials in 2007, the song was released as a double A-side single with Utada's song "Heart Station" on February 20, 2008.

== Background and development ==
In February 2007, Utada released "Flavor of Life", the theme song for the drama Hana Yori Dango Returns, which became one of their most commercially successful singles, selling over eight million downloads and becoming the second most digitally successful song of 2007 globally. This was followed by a second single in 2007, featuring the songs "Beautiful World", the theme song for the animated film Evangelion: 1.0 You Are (Not) Alone, and "Kiss & Cry", a song used to promote Nissin Foods' Cup Noodles.

On December 7, to celebrate the start of their tenth year since their debut, the song "Automatic" (1998) was released as a free ringtone for four days. At the same time, it was announced that Utada was working on their fifth Japanese studio album, to be released in spring 2008.

== Promotion and release ==
The song was first announced and used in Asience commercials in October 2007, and released as a ringtone on December 7. After a single month, the song's ringtones had been downloaded more than 250,000 times.

After the song was released to radio stations on January 7, it was heavily played on FM radio stations across Japan. It managed to reach number one on the newly established Billboard Japan Hot 100 chart in mid January, despite having no purchasable release at the time.

In February, Utada was featured in many music and fashion magazines in Japan to promote the single, including issues of Pia, Patipati, CD Data, What's In? and Pop Teen. On February 28, Utada performed the song live on Utaban. It has been part of two of Utada's concert setlists: their international tour Utada: In the Flesh 2010 and their two date concert series Wild Life in December 2010.

== Critical reception ==
CDJournal reviewers felt the song was simultaneously painful and warm, and praised the song's passionate lyrics and inflected vocals. They described the song's piano as having an "extremely pure" sound, like skipping stones on a surface of water, and felt the lyric "shūshoku mo kimatte, asonde bakkari iranai ne" ("You've got a job, so you can't just play all the time anymore") was particularly gripping. Takayuki Saito of Hot Express described the song as being as minimalist as possible, and noted it was rare of Utada to use feminine lyrics in the way they do in "Stay Gold", and praised the song's "high level of perfection".

Listen.jp reviewer Shigefumi Koike praised how the song showed off Utada's "adventurous spirit" while remaining an easily listenable pop song. He felt that "Stay Gold" displayed an effective use of the acoustic piano, and praised the song's emotion. Koike felt that both "Stay Gold" and "Heart Station" were a "magnificent" display of Utada's "futuristic" abilities as a sound creator, and that both songs showed off the emotive qualities of Utada's vocals and had great "ambient sound arrangements".

== Covers ==
In 2014, Ohashi Trio recorded a cover of "Stay Gold" for Utada Hikaru no Uta, a tribute album celebrating 15 years since Utada's debut.

== Track listings ==
All tracks are written by Hikaru Utada.

"Heart Station" / "Stay Gold" single
No.	Title	Length
1.	"Heart Station"	4:37
2.	"Stay Gold"	5:15
3.	"Heart Station (Original Karaoke)"	4:38
4.	"Stay Gold (Original Karaoke)"	5:15
Total length:		19:45

== Personnel ==
Personnel details were sourced from "Heart Station" / "Stay Gold"'s liner notes booklet.

- Goetz B. for 365 Artists – mixing
- Atsushi Matsui – recording
- Akira Miyake – production
- Yuzuru Tomita – acoustic piano, additional programming
- Hikaru Utada – acoustic piano, all vocals, arrangement, keyboards, production, programming, writing

== Charts ==
Chart (2008)	Peak position
Japan Hot 100 (Billboard)	1
Japan Oricon weekly singles: "Heart Station" / "Stay Gold"	3
Japan RIAJ Reco-kyō ringtones Top 100	4

== Sales and certifications ==
Chart	Amount
Oricon physical sales: "Heart Station" / "Stay Gold"	77,000
RIAJ ringtone certification	2× Platinum (500,000)
RIAJ cellphone download certification	Gold (100,000)
RIAJ physical certification: "Heart Station" / "Stay Gold"	Gold (100,000)

== Release history ==
Region	Date	Format	Distributing Label	Catalog codes
Japan	December 17, 2007	ringtone	EMI Music Japan	
Japan	January 7, 2008	radio debut	EMI Music Japan	
Japan	February 20, 2008	CD single, digital download	EMI Music Japan	TOCT-40200
South Korea	February 20, 2008	Digital download	Universal Music Korea	
Taiwan	August 31, 2007	CD single	Gold Typhoon	5099920619220
