= Kiss and cry (disambiguation) =

The Kiss and cry is the area in an ice rink where figure skaters wait for the scores of their performance.

Kiss and cry or Kiss & Cry may also refer to:

- Kiss and Cry (film), 2017 Canadian film
- "Kiss & Cry" (song), a song by Hikaru Utada
- Kim Yuna's Kiss & Cry, a South Korean TV series
