= Heart Station (song) =

Single by Hikaru Utada

from the album Heart Station
- Released: February 20, 2008
- Recorded: 2007
- Genre: Pop
- Length: 4:37
- Label: EMI Music Japan
- Songwriter: Hikaru Utada
- Producers: Hikaru Utada; Akira Miyake; Teruzane Utada

Hikaru Utada singles chronology
"Stay Gold" (2008)	"Heart Station" (2008)	"Prisoner of Love" (2008)

Music video
- "Heart Station" on YouTube

"Heart Station" is a song by Japanese-American musician Hikaru Utada, which was released as a double A-side single alongside the song "Stay Gold" on February 20, 2008. It served as the fifth single from their seventh studio album Heart Station. "Heart Station" was fully written, composed and produced by Utada. The song was created with the image of a song that would come on if you were to turn on your car radio on a late-night highway on your way home from work or play, with the title meaning a place that transmits radio waves from the heart. Musically, it is a midtempo pop ballad. Lyrically, it speaks about bidding someone adieu and still trying to reach them and maintain their presence in your life.

Commercially, "Heart Station" fared well in Japan. The song was heavily promoted on radio stations; for two weeks it was the number one song on the then-newly established Billboard Hot Top Airplay chart. Despite this success, it only managed to reach number two on the Billboard Japan Hot 100, being blocked by "Step and Go" from the boy band Arashi. "Heart Station" was certified three times by the Recording Industry Association of Japan (RIAJ) in different categories, including platinum for digital sales, gold in PC downloads, and gold in physical shipments.

== Background and composition ==
"Heart Station"
"Heart Station" is a midtempo pop ballad that speaks about saying goodbye and still trying to reach somebody and maintain their presence in your life.

In February 2007, Utada released "Flavor of Life", the theme song for the drama Hana Yori Dango Returns, which became one of their most commercially successful singles, selling over eight million downloads and becoming the second most digitally successful song of 2007 globally. This was followed by a second single in 2007, featuring the songs "Beautiful World", the theme song for the animated film Evangelion: 1.0 You Are (Not) Alone, and "Kiss & Cry", a song used to promote Nissin Foods' Cup Noodles.

In October 2007, Utada's song "Stay Gold" was unveiled in Kao Corporation's Asience shampoo commercials. It was released as a ringtone on December 7, which was downloaded over 250,000 times a month after its release, and was promoted at radio stations in January 2008.

Musically, "Heart Station" is a midtempo pop ballad that speaks about saying goodbye and still trying to reach somebody and maintain their presence in your life. During the process of writing the song, Utada decided to make the song have a theme of "heart electric waves", likening emotional signals to radio signals. They decided on this because they felt that radio stations had a hand-made, analog, loving and warm feeling to them, which resonated with the subject matter of the song.

== Promotion and release ==
The song was used in commercials for cellphone music store Recochoku from late January 2008, which featured Utada dancing in a bear suit fastened in the shape of their stuffed teddy bear, Kuma-chan. Due to the radio theme of the song's lyrics, the advertising campaign for the song focused on FM radio airplay. It was released to radio stations across Japan on January 21, and a special website was created for the song in order to make it easier for people to request the song on the radio.

In February, Utada went on a promotional campaign to promote the song, appearing on several music programs to perform the song: Hey! Hey! Hey! Music Champ on February 18, Music Station and Music Fighter on February 22, and at Count Down TV on February 23. They were featured in many music and fashion magazines in Japan to promote the single, including issues of Pia, Patipati, CD Data, What's In? and Pop Teen.

== Music video ==
Still from the music video, showing Utada riding on a subway train

The music video for the song was released on February 4, 2008. It was the first video since "Flavor of Life (Ballad Version)" to feature Utada personally (after animated videos were released for their other 2007 singles, "Kiss & Cry" and "Beautiful World"). The video was directed by Masashi Mutō, a director who had worked with such musical acts as Mika Nakashima and L'Arc-en-Ciel, however had not worked with Utada before.

The music video featured Utada wearing white headphones as they ride a subway train. Surrounding them are other subway users, who are immobile, and are either shown as black silhouettes or fast blurs. Mutō and Utada gave the video a theme of "gaze", and tried to focus on Utada's expressions and mannerisms as they rode among the other subway patrons.

== Critical reception ==
"Heart Station" was well-received by critics. CDJournal reviewers were positive, praising in particular the song's backing vocals reusing the melody line (described as having a "tender floating-feeling"), and Utada's arrangement. They felt that the song expressed sweet, sour and painful emotions, and praised the lyric "kokoro no denpa todoitemasu ka?" ("Do my heart's radio waves reach you?") in particular as "touching the heartstrings", as if a hand were stretching out and softly touching the listener. Takayuki Saito of Hot Express felt the work established Utada further as a sound creator, and praised their vocals, lyrics and the general "high level of perfection".

Listen.jp reviewer Shigefumi Koike praised how the song showed off Utada's "adventurous spirit" while remaining an easily listenable pop song. He felt that the most notable aspect of "Heart Station" was how Utada's raw, unprocessed vocals created a strong feeling of warmth. Koike felt that both "Stay Gold" and "Heart Station" were a "magnificent" display of Utada's "futuristic" abilities as a sound creator, and that both songs showed off the emotive qualities of Utada's vocals and had great "ambient sound arrangements".

== Commercial performance ==
The double A-side single "Heart Station/Stay Gold" debuted at number three on the Oricon Singles Chart, selling 48,430 copies in its first week. It slipped to number 14 the following week, logging sales of 13,640 copies. On March 3, 2008, "Heart Station" reached the top of the Billboard Hot Top Airplay chart, and managed to stay there for a total of two weeks. Despite this, the song peaked only at number two on the composite Japan Hot 100 chart, behind boyband Arashi's "Step and Go". The CD single for "Heart Station/Stay Gold" was certified gold by the Recording Industry Association of Japan (RIAJ) for sales of over 100,000 copies. In March 2009, "Heart Station" was certified platinum for selling over 250,000 digital downloads. The song was also certified gold for PC downloads of over 100,000.

== Track listing ==
All tracks are written by Hikaru Utada.

"Heart Station" / "Stay Gold" single
No.	Title	Length
1.	"Heart Station"	4:37
2.	"Stay Gold"	5:15
3.	"Heart Station" (original karaoke)	4:38
4.	"Stay Gold" (original karaoke)	5:15
Total length:		19:45

== Personnel ==
Personnel details were sourced from "Heart Station" / "Stay Gold"'s liner notes booklet.

- Goetz B. for 365 Artists – mixing
- Atsushi Matsui – recording
- Akira Miyake – production
- Yuzuru Tomita – additional programming
- Hikaru Utada – all vocals, arrangement, keyboards, production, programming, writing
- Teruzane Utada – production

== Charts ==
=== Weekly charts ===
Chart (2008)	Peak position
Billboard Japan Hot 100	2
Oricon Singles Chart: "Heart Station" / "Stay Gold"	3
RIAJ Reco-kyō ringtones Top 100	9

=== Year-end charts ===
Chart (2008)	Peak position
Billboard Japan Hot 100	13
Taiwan (Yearly Singles Top 100)	15

== Certifications ==
Region	Certification	Certified units/sales
Japan (RIAJ) Physical	Gold	144,081
Japan (RIAJ) Digital	Platinum	250,000^{*}
^{*} Sales figures based on certification alone.

== Release history ==
Region	Date	Format	Distributing label	Catalog codes
Japan	January 21, 2008	Ringtone, radio add date	EMI Music Japan	
Japan	February 20, 2008	CD single, digital download	EMI Music Japan	TOCT-40200
South Korea	February 20, 2008	Digital download	Universal Music Korea	
Taiwan	August 31, 2008	CD single	Gold Typhoon	5099920619220
