= Prisoner of Love (Hikaru Utada song) =

Single by Hikaru Utada

from the album Heart Station
- Released: March 26, 2008
- Recorded: 2007–February 2008
- Studio: Bunkamura Studio; EMI Music Japan Studio
- Genre: Pop; R&B
- Length: 4:46
- Label: EMI Music Japan
- Songwriter: Hikaru Utada
- Producer: Hikaru Utada

Hikaru Utada singles chronology
"Heart Station" (2008)	"Prisoner of Love" (2008)	"Come Back to Me" (2009)

Music video
- "Prisoner of Love" on YouTube

"Prisoner of Love" is a song by Japanese–American recording artist Hikaru Utada. It was cut from their fifth Japanese album, Heart Station (2008), making it their first Japanese recut single in nine years since "First Love" in 1999. "Prisoner of Love" is the theme song for the Fuji TV dorama Last Friends, making it their first song since "Sakura Drops" in 2002 to be used as a main theme song. It was released as a digital download on March 26, 2008, and as a CD single on May 21.

Musically, "Prisoner of Love" is a pop ballad heavily influenced by R&B music. The song lyrically depicts a sense of being trapped and unable to escape the intense emotions of love, highlighting the complex nature of relationships. "Prisoner of Love" received positive reception from most music critics, who praised Utada's vocal performance and production and noted the song as a standout from their vast discography.

Commercially, the song gained massive success. The physical single peaked at number two on the Oricon Singles Chart and was certified gold by the Recording Industry Association of Japan (RIAJ). The song fared much better digitally, selling one million full-length downloads and ringtones each. An accompanying music video was shot by Wataru Takeishi, which is a recreation of the song's production. The song was performed during Utada's two-date concert series Wild Life in December 2010 and has since appeared in several greatest hits albums by Utada.

== Background and production ==
"Prisoner of Love"
A sample of "Prisoner of Love", which is an R&B number that illustrates the complex nature of relationships

In January 2008, Utada posted a photo of the string recording of "Prisoner of Love" on their official website. The track "Prisoner of Love" was originally written for their English-language album This Is the One, but Utada decided that that they wanted to write it in Japanese, so they added Japanese lyrics and included it on the album Heart Station. When writing the English lyrics, they chose sharp lyrics, but when translating them into Japanese, they were conscious of not wanting the lyrics to sound flat, and used a crisp arrangement and singing style that is more black-like to avoid a heavy, muddy melody. Utada also said that when they first listened to this song through, they were moved to tears for the first time in a long time. At first, they wanted to make it a love song, but they were asked to write lyrics that could be interpreted as either friendship or love, as they thought there might be a tie-up with a dorama, and this made the writing process very difficult. Incidentally, the lyrics for "Prisoner of Love", as well as "Celebrate" and "Heart Station" were written in a family restaurant during a span of about three or four hours.

Musically, "Prisoner of Love" is a love song that follows an R&B influence; Utada stated that the song was inspired by the rest of the album's "honest" theme, and recognized it as a return to R&B music. According to Utada, the chord progression and the opening part are very similar to the 2000 single "Wait & See (Risk)". They had written this type of song several times before, so they had been avoiding this type of song for a while, but this was the song that they felt like writing again after a long time.

== Reception ==
Music critics gave "Prisoner of Love" positive feedback. A reviewer from CDJournal described the song as "well-programmed" when reviewing the single. Meg from JaME World gave the song a glowing review, praising Utada's vocal performance and asserted that it was an excellent theme choice for Last Friends. Retrospectively, Neil Z. Yeung, who contributed in writing the biography of Utada at AllMusic, highlighted the song "Prisoner of Love" as some of their greatest work. It won the Best Theme Song Award in the 57th Drama Academy Awards.

== Commercial performance ==
"Prisoner of Love" debuted at number two on the Oricon Singles Chart, selling 38,902 copies in its first week. It dropped to number seven the next week, selling 14,289 copies. "Prisoner of Love" then slid to number seventeen, before dropping to number eighteen on its fourth charting week and out of the top twenty entirely the following week. "Prisoner of Love" ranked in the top 100 for nine consecutive weeks and in the charts for twelve weeks as a whole. The Recording Industry Association of Japan (RIAJ) certified the single gold in May 2008 for shipments exceeding 100,000 copies. In December 2008, Oricon named "Prisoner of Love" the 95th best-selling physical single in Japan that year, with 81,626 copies sold.

Digitally, "Prisoner of Love" was a great success in Japan. On May 13, 2008, Barks.jp reported "Prisoner of Love" had sold over 1.5 million downloads across all formats, and on July 7, 2008, Yahoo!Japan reported it had sold over 2.9 million downloads. "Prisoner of Love" was the third most downloaded song in Japan during 2008 behind Greeeen's "Kiseki" and Thelma Aoyama's "Soba ni Iru ne." The RIAJ certified "Prisoner of Love" million twice for selling over one million full-length downloads and ringtones each, as well as gold for selling over 100,000 legal downloads on PCs in the country. This pushed the tallied sales volume for the song to 2.182 million, making "Prisoner of Love" one of the best-selling multi-format singles in Japan.

== Promotion ==
The music video, which gives an informal view on Utada's creative process.

"Prisoner of Love" (Quiet Version) serves as the insert song for the Japanese television drama, Last Friends, while the original version is used in the opening theme. The song was performed during Utada's two date concert series Wild Life in December 2010.

The video for "Prisoner of Love", directed by Wataru Takeishi, features Utada writing, arranging, and composing the song. They are seen doing push-ups and punching the air, while the scene switches back to them crafting the song and having writer's block. This was Utada's idea, and almost all of the items in the video, including the various equipment, lyric notebooks, work table, sofa, etc., are their personal belongings.

The video is the first to use various references to Utada's U3 blog. They are seen peeling and eating an orange-like fruit called a mikan, and in their blog they mentioned having a surplus of them. They are also seen drawing their inventive superhero, Super-Kuman, based on Kuma Chang, their stuffed bear, which is the subject for the song "Boku wa Kuma".

== Track listing ==
CD+DVD version

CD
No.	Title	Length
1.	"Prisoner of Love"	4:46
2.	"Prisoner of Love" (quiet version)	4:34
3.	"Prisoner of Love" (original karaoke)	4:44
4.	"Prisoner of Love" (quiet version; original karaoke)	4:34

DVD
No.	Title	Length
1.	"Prisoner of Love" (music video)

== Chart rankings ==
=== Weekly charts ===
Chart (2008)	Peak position
Japan Hot 100 (Billboard)	2
Japan Singles (Oricon)	2
RIAJ Reco-kyō ringtones Top 100	2
RIAJ Reco-kyō ringtones Top 100: Quiet Version	27

Chart (2010)	Peak position
RIAJ Digital Track Chart Top 100	83

=== Year-end charts ===
Chart (2008)	Position
Japan Hot 100 (Billboard)	48
Japan Singles (Oricon)	95

== Certifications and sales ==
Certifications and sales for "Prisoner of Love"
Region	Certification	Certified units/sales
Japan (RIAJ)	Gold	83,626
Japan (RIAJ) Ringtone	Million	1,000,000^{*}
Japan (RIAJ) Download	Million	1,000,000^{*}
Japan (RIAJ) digital sales; PC Download	Gold	100,000^{^}
Streaming
Japan (RIAJ)	Gold	50,000,000^{†}
^{*} Sales figures based on certification alone.^{^} Shipments figures based on certification alone.^{†} Streaming-only figures based on certification alone.
