= List of number-one digital singles of 2012 (Japan) =

This is a list of songs that reached #1 on the RIAJ Digital Track Chart in Japan in 2012. The highest-selling digital singles in Japan are published by Recording Industry Association of Japan. PC downloads and ringtone downloads are not eligible for the chart, only cellphone downloads (Chaku-uta Full) count for the chart.

The chart week runs from Wednesday to Tuesday. The first week of 2012, starting January 3, was merged with the following week (1/4-1/10) due to New Year's celebrations.

== Chart history ==
Issue date	Song	Artist(s)	Reference(s)
January 10	"Tatoe Donnani..."	Kana Nishino	
January 17	"Rising Sun"	Exile	
January 24	"Sekai de Ichiban Suteki na Kimi e."	Sonar Pocket	
January 31	"Sign"	Juju	
February 7	"Hajimari no Toki"	Ayaka	
February 14	"Give Me Five!"	AKB48	
February 21	"Give Me Five!"	AKB48	
February 28	"Misenai Namida wa, Kitto Itsuka"	Greeeen	
March 6	"Sakura, I Love You?"	Kana Nishino	
March 13	"Sakura, I Love You?"	Kana Nishino	
March 20	"Inori (Namida no Kidō)"	Mr. Children	
March 27	"Inori (Namida no Kidō)"	Mr. Children	
April 3	"Inori (Namida no Kidō)"	Mr. Children	
April 10	"Inori (Namida no Kidō)"	Mr. Children	
April 17	"Getsu Ka Sui Moku Kin Do Nichi. (Kimi ni Okuru Uta)"	Sonar Pocket	
April 24	"Orange"	Greeeen	
May 8	"Haru Uta"	Ikimono-gakari	
May 15	"Be..."	Ms. Ooja	
May 22	"Watashitachi"	Kana Nishino	
May 29	"Watashitachi"	Kana Nishino	
June 5	"Watashitachi"	Kana Nishino	
June 12	"Entenka"	Shōnan no Kaze	
June 19	"Tadaima"	Juju	
June 26	"Believe"	Che'Nelle	
July 3	"Believe"	Che'Nelle	
July 10	"Believe"	Che'Nelle	
July 17	"Believe"	Che'Nelle	
July 24	"Go for It!!"	Kana Nishino	

== See also ==
- List of number one Reco-kyō Chart singles 2006–2009
