= This Is Love (Hikaru Utada song) =

Single by Hikaru Utada

from the album Ultra Blue
- Released: May 31, 2006
- Recorded: 2006
- Genre: Techno, Electro
- Length: 4:58
- Label: EMI Music Japan
- Songwriter: Hikaru Utada
- Producer: Hikaru Utada

Hikaru Utada singles chronology
"Keep Tryin'" (2006)	"This Is Love" (2006)	"Boku wa Kuma" (2006)

"This Is Love" is Hikaru Utada's first Japanese digital single (23rd overall). It was released on May 31, 2006, as a promotional single for their sixth studio album, Ultra Blue.

"This Is Love" was used in a Nissin cup noodle campaign and was the opening theme for Freedom, which was also tied into the Nippon campaign. The digital single reached number one in virtually every online music store in Japan prior to the Ultra Blue album release, including the most used store in Japan, iTunes Japan, as well as OnGen, among others. Utada herself is quoted to have said that this song is about expressing that "love is like a mix of extremes: anxiety and peace."

On December 20, 2006, iTunes Japan released a list of top downloaded singles and albums; "This is Love" ranked as #9 making it the 9th most downloaded song for 2006.

== Charts ==
Chart (2006)	Peak position
RIAJ Reco-kyō ringtones Top 100	77

== Certifications and sales ==
Chart	Amount
RIAJ ringtone cellphone downloads	500,000+
RIAJ full-length cellphone downloads	250,000+
RIAJ PC downloads	100,000+
