= Boku wa Kuma =

Single by Hikaru Utada

from the album Heart Station
- Released: November 22, 2006
- Recorded: 2006
- Genre: J-pop, novelty
- Length: 2:23
- Label: EMI Music Japan
- Songwriter: Hikaru Utada
- Producer: Hikaru Utada

Hikaru Utada singles chronology
"This Is Love" (2006)	"Boku wa Kuma" (2006)	"Flavor of Life" (2007)

"Boku wa Kuma" (ぼくはくま; lit. I'm a Bear) is a song by Japanese-American singer-songwriter Hikaru Utada, serving as their 17th Japanese single and 24th single overall (including English releases). The single was released on November 22, 2006, following the release of their previous studio album, Ultra Blue (2006). It came two months after the conclusion of the Utada United 2006 tour.

== Background and release ==
"Boku wa Kuma" was Utada's first try at writing a children's song. On October 1, 2006, it aired on the children's music program Minna no Uta on radio, and on TV the day after. Due to strong demand, the song had been planned for continuous rebroadcasting from October 2006 to January 2007 on Minna no Uta.

"Boku wa Kuma" was Utada's first single release to have three different pressings: a limited edition that included a picture book, a standard single and cover, and a CD+DVD combo pack, which included the music video.

The song is about a bear, what he can and cannot do, and what he is not (such as a car, chocolate, etc.). His rival is a fried shrimp.

Utada owns a stuffed bear named Kuma-chan; "kuma" is "bear" in Japanese, and "-chan" is an affectionate suffix added to names. Utada often post photos of him on their U3 blog. After discovering the "made in China" tag on Kuma-chan's bottom, he was given the full name of "Kuma Chang" (pronounced identically to "Kuma-chan" in Japanese). A staff pass was issued to him for the Utada United 2006 tour.

In June 2006, Utada confessed on their blog that they have "pillow dependence". They call their pillow "makura-san" (Mr. Pillow). They enjoy the comfort of feeling the pillow against their face, and would even hold the pillow all day long when they are stressed out. They were later surprised to find out that there are many "pillow-addicts" out there, and joked about setting up a "pillow club". 'Makura-san' and Kuma are apparently good friends.

Utada gave an impromptu performance of "Boku wa Kuma" at the Boston show of their 2010 tour, Utada: In The Flesh 2010.

The song was performed during Utada's two-date concert series Wild Life in December 2010 and during her 2024 Science Fiction 25th anniversary tour.

== Track listing ==
Japanese single

1. "Boku wa Kuma" (ぼくはくま) – 2:23
2. "Boku wa Kuma" (Original Karaoke) – 2:25

== Charts ==
Chart (2006)	Peak position
Oricon Weekly singles	4
RIAJ Reco-kyō ringtones Top 100	14

== Certifications and sales ==
Chart	Amount
Oricon physical sales	147,000
RIAJ physical certification	100,000+
RIAJ full-length cellphone downloads	100,000+
