= Precious (Cubic U album) =

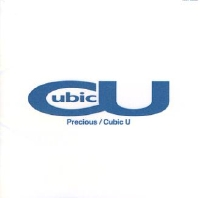

Studio album by Cubic U
- Released: January 28, 1998
- Recorded: August 5–20, 1996
- Studio: Sony Music Studios (New York City, U.S.)
- Genre: R&B
- Length: 54:42
- Label: Toshiba EMI
- Producer: Hikaru Utada, Teruzane Utada, Fuji Keiko, Michael C. Warner, Booker T. Jones, Bert Price

Hikaru Utada chronology
Precious (1998)	First Love (1999)

Singles from Precious
- 1. "Close to You" Released: January 28, 1998

Precious is the debut English-language album by Cubic U released in Japan on January 28, 1998 by Toshiba EMI. It was recorded at Sony Music Studios in New York City in 1996. Cubic U is both Hikaru Utada's former stage name and the name of their R&B backing band. The album was never released commercially in the United States due to internal problems with the label EMI, and was only available to music industry insiders. Although it failed to chart on the Oricon charts at the time of its release, the album was re-released on March 31, 1999 after the huge success of Utada's First Love, reaching number two with 702,060 copies sold.

== Track listing ==
All tracks are written by Hikaru Utada and Charlene Harrison, except for tracks 3, 5, 7 and 12 written by Utada, Harrison and Michael C. Warner and track 9 written by Utada and Warner. "Close to You" is a cover version of the Burt Bacharach–Hal David composition "(They Long to Be) Close to You" made famous by the Carpenters.

No.	Title	Length
1.	"My Little Lover Boy"	4:28
2.	"Lullaby"	4:38
3.	"How Ya Doin'"	3:05
4.	"I Don't Love You"	4:51
5.	"Here and There and Back Again" (on promo copies only)	4:47
6.	"Promise"	5:24
7.	"Ticket 4 Two"	5:23
8.	"Take a Little While"	3:52
9.	"100 Reasons Why"	4:31
10.	"Work Things Out"	4:31
11.	"Close to You"	4:39
12.	"Precious Love"	5:20
13.	"How Ya Doin' (Rap Version)" (bonus track)	3:46
Total length:		54:42

Note: Several promo copies of the album have the track "Here and There and Back Again" as track 5. This was not released physically.

== Release history ==
Country	Date	Version	Label
Japan	January 28, 1998	Original	Toshiba-EMI
Japan	March 31, 1999	Re-release	Toshiba-EMI

== Singles ==
Date	Title
January 28, 1997	"Close to You"

== Charts ==
Precious - Oricon sales chart (Japan)

Release	Chart	Peak position	Sales total
March 31, 1999 (re-release)
March 31, 1999 (re-release)	Oricon Weekly Albums Chart	2	702,060
March 31, 1999 (re-release)	Oricon Yearly Albums Chart	35	702,060
