= Freedom Project =

Japanese promotional project by Nissin Cup Noodles

- Freedom
- Genre: Science fiction, Action-adventure, Mystery
- Original video animation
- Directed by: Shuhei Morita
- Produced by: Motoki Mukaichi (1–3); Jun Takei (4–7); Shinjirō Yokoyama; Yasumasa Tsuchiya; Hideo Matsushita
- Written by: Katsuhiko Chiba; Dai Satō
- Music by: Yoshihiro Ike
- Studio: Sunrise
- Licensed by: AUS: Madman Entertainment; NA: Discotek Media; UK: Manga Entertainment
- Released: November 24, 2006 – May 23, 2008
- Runtime: Prologue: 6 minutes Episode 1: 21 minutes Episodes 2–6: 22 minutes Episode 7: 45 minutes
- Episodes: 7 episodes 1 prologue
- Novel

Freedom: Footmark Days
- Written by: Kō Furukawa
- Illustrated by: Daisuke Sajiki; Yoshihiro Sono
- Published by: Shogakukan
- Imprint: Gagaga Bunko
- Published: May 24, 2007 – May 20, 2008
- Scenario books
- Freedom Scenarios

Freedom Project is a Japanese promotional project by Nissin Cup Noodles for their 35th anniversary in 2006. As part of the project, the 7-part OVA series, titled Freedom, was commissioned with and designed by Katsuhiro Otomo (of the anime film Steamboy and the manga Akira and its film adaptation) serving as the character and mecha designer. The series is directed by Shuhei Morita, creator of the award-winning animation short Kakurenbo, and is authored by celebrated writer Dai Satō, Katsuhiko Chiba and Yuuichi Nomura. The series openly displays its sponsor's product placement in numerous scenes in which characters are shown consuming Nissin Cup Noodles.

The OVA is animated and produced by Sunrise and distributed by Bandai Visual. "Freedom Committee" is the collective term used for the entire creative team behind Freedom, which includes animators and production staff members who have previously worked on Steamboy.

The theme song for the series, titled "This Is Love", is performed by popular Japanese pop singer Hikaru Utada. A second song, "Kiss & Cry", Hikaru Utada's 19th Japanese single, was used for Nissin's fifth television commercial for Freedom, which began airing in Japan starting April 20, 2007.

== Plot ==
Freedom is about a child, Takeru, discovering a secret that could change the very society he depends upon. Civilization on the Earth was destroyed by a permanent abnormal climate shift. Cities with millions of people had been built on the far side of the Moon and became the only place where humanity still survived. The remaining population declared the foundation of Republic Eden, then set forth expanding those lunar colonies that loved peace and freedom.

More than 160 years have passed since then. In Eden, children complete their compulsory education program when they are 15 years old. They are then integrated into the society as citizens. During their brief moratorium they are granted freedom. Like other boys, Takeru decides to take part in a race with his friends using machines particular to the Moon, called "Vehicle". But what distinguishes Takeru is that he has constructed his own vehicle. When his vehicle catches fire on a public road he is sentenced to 10 hours of "volunteer" work outside the dome, where he discovers the remains of a small crashed capsule bearing photographs and articles seemingly sent from Earth. Structures visible in the background identify the location they were taken as the Kennedy launch facility in Florida.

Infatuated with a young woman in the photograph, Takeru attempts to research conditions on Earth and finds that the library's information on the home planet is heavily censored. Furthermore, nobody is permitted to travel far enough from the dome over the lunar surface to get within visual range. He discovers a small enclave of people living in a facility outside of Eden's centralized control, and after befriending the enclave's leader is given access to a moon rover with sufficient range to get a view of Earth. He sees that the Earth is blue; it has recovered from the disaster that befell it and is now habitable again. The authorities of Eden pursue Takeru, attempting to suppress this discovery, but Takeru and his friend Bismarck manage to commandeer an old "escape" rocket and leave Eden to explore Earth first hand.

The escape rocket's capsule comes down slightly off course, landing in the ruins of Las Vegas, and Takeru and Bismarck use Takeru's vehicle to make the overland trek across the United States.

== Characters ==
- Takeru — Age: 15, Height: 170 cm. A third-generation Moon-dweller with a big appetite for Cup Noodles, Takeru has a warm and cheerful personality but is somewhat shy with girls. Takeru has a fascination for visiting the Earth. (Voiced by Daisuke Namikawa (Japanese) and Michael Sinterniklaas (English))
- Kazuma — Age: 15, Height: 175 cm. A close friend of Takeru, Kazuma is the quiet and cool type. He has a younger sister Chiyo. (Voiced by Morikubo Shotaro (Japanese) and Johnny Yong Bosch (English))
- Bismarck — Age: 15, Height: 160 cm. Close friends with Takeru and Kazuma, Bismarck has an introverted nature. He is called Biz by his friends. Although not an accomplished rider, he is an ace with vehicle mechanics. (Voiced by Kappei Yamaguchi (Japanese) and Robby Sharpe (English))
- Taira — Age: 15, Height: 171 cm. A Tube Race rival that Takeru met and lost out to in Freedom 1. Taira is an extremely accomplished rider and leader of the Tube Racers group called Moon Shine. (Voiced by Takuya Kirimoto (Japanese) and Greg Abbey (English))
- Junk — The owner of Moonraker, a garage found in Eden. This was where Takeru's vehicle was repaired and modified in preparation for the Tube Race in Freedom 1.
- Alan — A senior member of Freedom living in the subterranean levels of Eden's domes. He provides the high-powered engine for Takeru's damaged vehicle after his disastrous challenge with Taira. Alan also dons an Apollo jacket similar to the one worn by Takeru. His name is likely a reference to US Astronaut Alan Shepard. (Voiced by Seizō Katō (Japanese) and William Frederick Knight (English))
- Ao - The young Native American woman in the photo that Takeru is trying to find. (Voiced by Sanae Kobayashi (Japanese) and Stephanie Sheh (English))
- Chiyo — Kazuma's younger sister.
- Gosshu — A member of Moon Shine.
- Naomi — A member of Moon Shine.

== Marketing ==
As with most other major film and animation releases in Japan, a wide array of promotional merchandise was marketed before and during the OVA's release, including Nissin Cup Noodles with lead character Takeru printed on the lid, small desktop figurines, a 4 flavours Nissin Cup Noodles bundled Freedom DVD gift set, a limited Nissin Cup Noodle container and badges designed by video rental outlet Tsutaya that came free with the purchase of Freedom 1, among tie-ins with other retailers. Although Freedom Project is a direct-to-video (DVD) animation, it stands apart from conventional OVA series first by the involvement of Otomo, and also from the collaboration with Nissin Cup Noodles resulting in extensive TV advertising scheduled to run through the duration of the series until its conclusion with Freedom 6.

Publicity for the series began April 11, 2006, with large banners and posters featuring concept sketches of the lead characters Takeru, Kazuma and their vehicles lining Tokyo's busiest train stations, such as Shibuya and Shinjuku — the latter being the busiest railway station in the world with 3 million transiting passengers every day. These initial pencil-work posters were later replaced by fully coloured, CG created versions with finished background art, giving the effect of a work-in-progress animation piece being completed.

At the same time, 30-second television spots were shown on TV — short trailers providing a glimpse of the story to unfold in Freedom 1. The 5th advertising spot is currently being shown on Japanese television [April 20, 2007], and reveals major plot advances from Freedom 3. Some of these spots were made available on the limited-edition Freedom Previsited DVD (see release notes below).

A special Freedom Project page, a collaboration between Yahoo! Japan and Nissin, will also stream every episode of the series one week before its DVD release date.

Print ads showcasing Katsuhiro Otomo's sketches for the OVA were also released in magazines nationwide. Shortly before the Freedom 1 DVD release, many popular media, manga and animation magazines ran articles for the OVA, featuring mecha design descriptions and interviews with staff members.

The largely successful publicity campaign for Freedom Project was very well received by fans of Katsuhiro Otomo and animation fans in Japan, who saw him returning to his strengths of designing stylish mecha and memorable characters.

It seemed that Otomo was concerned with the production of this work overall and was the director at first, but was over for participation only for character and mechanic design after all. According to the announcement of Nissin side, nonparticipation of Otomo is on schedule, Otomo confesses having resigned this work, or has refused the comment with some magazines.

== Releases ==
=== DVD ===
Freedom Previsited, a special limited-edition DVD, was released on October 27, 2006, features a 6-minute prologue of Freedom as well as various staff interviews. Freedom 1, the first episode from the series, was released on DVD on November 24, 2006, followed by Freedom 2 on February 23, 2007, Freedom 3 on April 25, 2007, Freedom 4 on July 27, 2007, Freedom 5 on October 26, 2007, Freedom 6 on January 25, 2008, and Freedom 7 on May 23, 2008.

=== HD DVD release ===
On January 9, 2007, Bandai Visual announced Freedom Project as a title in its first wave of sub-only releases on the HD DVD Twin format, with each disc being single-sided with dual layers, one HD DVD layer and one DVD layer. The first episode, Freedom 1, was released on June 26, 2007, followed by Freedom 2 on September 25, 2007, Freedom 3 on December 11, 2007, Freedom 4 on February 26, 2008, Freedom 5 on April 22, 2008, and Freedom 6 on June 24, 2008.

Freedom 7 had been planned for an August 2008 release, but as a result of Toshiba ceasing production of the HD DVD format in February 2008, the release was canceled. Freedom 6 was the final title to be released on HD DVD.

=== Blu-ray release ===
Bandai Visual released a Blu-ray box set of all 7 episodes on November 11, 2008, complete with English Dub and English subtitles. Discotek Media released a Blu-ray and DVD combo pack of the anime on April 25, 2017.

== Books ==
Shogakukan has published several books related to the Freedom franchise under its Gagaga Bunko label.

Freedom: Footmark Days (FREEDOM フットマークデイズ, FREEDOM Futtomākudeizu) is a series of 3 novels which follows Kazuma's, one of the main characters, side of the story. It is a side-story that runs parallel to the main storyline, and also introduces characters not seen in the anime (ISBN 9784094510072, ISBN 978-4-09-451038-6, ISBN 978-4-09-451067-6).

Freedom Scenarios delves into the making of the OVA series. It is written in Japanese and divided into 2 books, 0-3 and 4-7 respectively. Both books contain scenarios (the script for each episode), interviews with writers, production crew, voice actors, concept and production art, and a detailed encyclopedia for terms related to Freedom (ISBN 9784091064103, ISBN 978-4-09-106417-2).
