= Beautiful World (Hikaru Utada song) =

2007 single by Hikaru Utada

- "Beautiful World" / "Kiss & Cry" cover.

Single by Hikaru Utada

from the album Heart Station
- Released: August 29, 2007
- Recorded: 2007
- Studio: Bunkamura Studio
- Genre: J-pop
- Length: 5:18
- Label: EMI Music Japan
- Songwriter: Hikaru Utada
- Producers: Hikaru Utada; Akira Miyake; Teruzane Utada

Hikaru Utada singles chronology
"Kiss & Cry" (2007)	"Beautiful World" (2007)	"Do You" (2007)

Alternate cover
- "Beautiful World (Planitb Acoustica Mix)" digital download cover

Beautiful World is a song by Japanese-American singer-songwriter Hikaru Utada. Utada wrote the song as the theme for Evangelion: 1.0 You Are (Not) Alone (2007), the first film in the Rebuild of Evangelion series. EMI Music Japan issued it with "Kiss & Cry" as a double A-side single on August 29, 2007. Utada wrote and co-produced "Beautiful World", drawing on the story, dialogue, characters, and imagery of Neon Genesis Evangelion and centering its lyrics on emotional attachment and human connection.

Music critics praised the song's emotional depth and its relationship with Evangelion. "Beautiful World/Kiss & Cry" peaked at number two on the Oricon Singles Chart, while "Beautiful World" received multiple certifications from the Recording Industry Association of Japan (RIAJ). The song was subsequently revisited for later installments of the Rebuild of Evangelion film series, as "Beautiful World -PLANiTb Acoustica Mix-" for Evangelion: 2.0 You Can (Not) Advance (2009) and "Beautiful World (Da Capo Version)" for Evangelion: 3.0+1.0 Thrice Upon a Time (2021).

== Background and composition ==
Hikaru Utada's interest in Neon Genesis Evangelion led to their involvement with Evangelion: 1.0 You Are (Not) Alone (2007). In 2006, they discussed their affinity with Evangelion in an interview for Weekly Playboy. Director Hideaki Anno and the film's staff read the interview and subsequently approached Utada to provide its theme song. Producer Toshimichi Ōtsuki, a representative of King Records and producer of Evangelion, similarly recalled that Anno had personally proposed Utada for the theme song. Ōtsuki then personally oversaw matters concerning Utada's involvement. Utada herself recalled that they had written their songs for the earlier installments of Rebuild of Evangelion, the film series to which Evangelion: 1.0 You Are (Not) Alone belongs, after hearing only a general description of the plot on each occasion. For "Beautiful World", Utada drew on the series' story, dialogue, characters, and pivotal scenes, describing the song as something they had written "through Evangelion". They conceived it around the idea that attachment to another person can make life bearable, connecting this theme to Shinji Ikari's desire to reunite with his mother and Asuka Langley Soryu's longing for maternal affection. They also shaped the song around the series' imagery and atmosphere, recognizing parallels between its themes and those of their own songwriting. Utada intended the main chorus to apply to any of the series' characters. They later realized, however, that it had naturally reflected primarily feelings between parent and child, particularly Rei Ayanami's feelings toward Shinji.

Two other Utada recordings preceded the single's release. "Kiss & Cry", which later accompanied "Beautiful World" on the double A-side single, served as the theme song for Nissin Foods' Freedom Project advertising campaign; ringtone distribution began on April 20, 2007. Utada also revisited "Fly Me to the Moon", whose various renditions had accompanied the original Neon Genesis Evangelion television series as its ending theme. "Fly Me to the Moon (In Other Words) -2007 Mix-" reworked Utada's rendition from the 2000 single "Wait & See (Risk)" and accompanied a trailer for Evangelion: 1.0 You Are (Not) Alone; a full-track mobile download followed on June 29 and a PC download on July 4. Animate Times editor Yūki Ōta felt that "Beautiful World" and Utada's later Evangelion themes reflected the perspective of the audience rather than that of the works themselves. Miyuki Sawashiro, the voice actress of Sakura Suzuhara, later recalled that "Beautiful World" and "Sakura Nagashi", Utada's theme song for the third Rebuild of Evangelion film, came to mind while she read the final portion of the screenplay for Evangelion: 3.0+1.0 Thrice Upon a Time (2021), the final film in the Rebuild series. Although she had previously regarded them as songs about Shinji, the film led her to consider that they might instead be understood from Gendo Ikari's perspective. Real Sound described the track as combining delicacy with strength. Another Real Sound analysis highlighted Utada's vocal technique on the song, noting the combination of falsetto and mixed voice, which allowed for a delicate delivery without sacrificing vocal strength. Writer Satoru Ryūsei characterized "Beautiful World" as a "song of wishes", centered on a strong desire to connect with another person despite the difficulty of fully expressing such feelings. He further described the song as being built around an emotional minor-key melody, with Utada prominently incorporating falsetto in the chorus. According to Ryūsei, layered synthesizers and vocal harmonies give the production a transparent, floating quality that reinforces its sense of yearning.

== Release and other versions ==
"Beautiful World" became available for online preview on July 16, 2007, alongside the release of a new trailer for Evangelion: 1.0 You Are (Not) Alone. It entered radio and Usen rotation on July 23, alongside the advance release of its ringtone. Barks reported that radio airplay began at midnight that day. EMI Music Japan issued "Beautiful World" with "Kiss & Cry" as a double A-side CD single on August 29, 2007. The single also included karaoke versions of both title tracks, as well as "Fly Me to the Moon (In Other Words) -2007 Mix-" and its corresponding karaoke version. The song's inclusion in Evangelion: 1.0 You Are (Not) Alone affected the release of the film's music. Composer Shirō Sagisu recalled that the staff did not consider a release without Utada's theme song a proper original soundtrack; when including "Beautiful World" in time for the film's theatrical release proved difficult, Anno proposed issuing the initial music collection, Music from Evangelion: 1.0 You Are (Not) Alone, under Sagisu's name instead. A separate original soundtrack, released on May 21, 2008, later included both "Beautiful World" and "Fly Me to the Moon (In Other Words) -2007 Mix-". "Beautiful World" also appeared on Utada's fifth studio album, Heart Station, released on March 19, 2008.

In 2009, "Beautiful World" was reworked as "Beautiful World -Planitb Acoustica Mix-" for Evangelion: 2.0 You Can (Not) Advance. The new version replaced the original's electronic arrangement with an acoustic-oriented sound and became available digitally on June 27. Utada and Russell McNamara produced the recording; McNamara also handled programming and guitars, while Dan Reynolds played drums. They recorded the track at Planitb Studios in Norwich, England, while Goetz B. mixed it at Matrix Studios in London. Animate Times characterized the acoustic arrangement as giving the song a more melancholic quality. Real Sound writer Satoru Ryūsei contrasted the remix with the original, describing its band arrangement as producing a more grounded sound and noting that its handclaps gave it a greater sense of humanity. The original and the Acoustica Mix later appeared as tracks five and thirteen, respectively, on the first disc of Utada's compilation album Utada Hikaru Single Collection Vol. 2, released on November 24, 2010. In December 2018, "Beautiful World" became available in high-resolution audio as part of a remastered edition of Heart Station, issued as part of a series of high-resolution album remasters marking the 20th anniversary of Utada's debut.

For Evangelion: 3.0+1.0 Thrice Upon a Time (2021), director Hideaki Anno personally asked Utada to revisit "Beautiful World". With "One Last Kiss" expected to be too short for the film's unusually long end credits, Anno wanted to add "Beautiful World" at the end as a concluding theme for both the Rebuild of Evangelion film series and the film as a whole. Utada accepted the request and recorded "Beautiful World (Da Capo Version)", their first self-cover, remaking the song from scratch. Yuta Bandoh provided the string arrangement. Real Sound also credited him with arranging the recording. The completed version forms a two-song medley with "One Last Kiss" in the film's end credits. The One Last Kiss EP featured "Beautiful World (Da Capo Version)" alongside the original "Beautiful World" and "Beautiful World -PLANiTb Acoustica Mix-", as well as Utada's other previously released Evangelion themes "Sakura Nagashi" and "Fly Me to the Moon (In Other Words) -2007 Mix-". Barks described "Beautiful World (Da Capo Version)" as a slow ballad, highlighting the melancholic sound of its acoustic guitar and violin. "Beautiful World (Da Capo Version)" later appeared as a bonus track on Utada's eighth studio album, Bad Mode, released digitally on January 19, 2022, and physically on February 23. In 2024, Utada revisited the original recording for their first greatest-hits album, Science Fiction, released on April 10 to commemorate the 25th anniversary of their debut. The resulting "Beautiful World (2024 Mix)" was one of ten previously released songs newly mixed for the album. The 2024 mix also appeared on the album's limited vinyl edition, released on June 26.

== Promotion and live performances ==
Utada Hikaru performed "Beautiful World" on Hey! Hey! Hey! Music Champ on September 3, 2007, and Music Station on September 7. The song later formed part of the set list for Utada's two Wild Life concerts at Yokohama Arena on December 8 and 9, 2010. It later appeared on the concert's home-video release. In 2022, Utada performed "Beautiful World (Da Capo Version)" during Hikaru Utada Live Sessions from Air Studios, accompanied by a prominent bassline and delicate piano. Reviewing the performance for Barks, Hideo Miyamoto described it as a slow tune featuring acoustic guitar, with its soundscape gradually changing as live drums and bass entered and the emotional intensity increased. Spice writer Rie Hata likewise noted its expansion from vocals and a single acoustic guitar into a full band sound, while Real Sound's Azusa Ogiwara emphasized the gradual addition of backing vocals and the rhythm section to build tension. Writing for Billboard Japan, Tsuyachan highlighted the attention to timbre and resonance, identifying tribal-sounding percussion as a major feature and citing "Beautiful World" among the songs that exemplified this approach. Netflix released the concert film worldwide on June 9, 2022, while the live album arrived on digital platforms the same day and included the performance. In 2024, both the Wild Life rendition of "Beautiful World" and the Live Sessions from Air Studios rendition of "Beautiful World (Da Capo Version)" appeared in Utada's Hikaru Utada Live Chronicles project, a series of eight previous live-video releases issued on Blu-ray. That year, Utada also performed "Beautiful World" during the Science Fiction Tour, their first nationwide tour in six years; the tour's concert film later featured the performance.

== Music video ==
A video combining "Beautiful World" with footage from the film was included on the bonus disc of the 2008 special-edition Evangelion: 1.01 DVD, while trailers featuring "Beautiful World" were later included among the extras on the film's Evangelion: 1.11 Blu-ray release. Two music videos for "Beautiful World" were also produced, both using footage from the Rebuild of Evangelion films. Hideaki Anno, chief director of Evangelion: 1.0 You Are (Not) Alone, directed the original video, which uses animation from the film. The second promoted Utada's 15th-anniversary tribute album Utada Hikaru no Uta, which featured various artists covering Utada's songs. Supervised by Kazuya Tsurumaki, it combines footage from the first three Rebuild of Evangelion films with previously unseen cuts. Tsurumaki argued that a film's end credits should be more than a list of staff members and, like its story, direction, and characters, help elevate the film as a whole. "Beautiful World (Da Capo Version)" later accompanied a series of six character-focused promotional videos for Evangelion: 3.0+1.0 Thrice Upon a Time, featuring scenes and dialogue centered on Shinji, Rei, Asuka, Mari Illustrious Makinami, Kaworu Nagisa, and Misato Katsuragi across all four Rebuild of Evangelion films.

== Reception and cultural impact ==
CDJournal described "Beautiful World" as possessing "an almost painful beauty" that combines transience with passionate feelings. Tetsuo Hiraga of Hot Express praised Utada's sensibility in opening the song with a wish to remain beside someone, finding the line particularly resonant with the Evangelion characters. He interpreted the song's "beautiful world" as one in which a person could continue living and wishing to live because of someone else's presence despite abandonment, betrayal, hurt, and despair, and looked forward to seeing how closely the song would "synchronize" with Evangelion: 1.0 You Are (Not) Alone. Carlo Santos of Anime News Network wrote that Utada's end-credits song "doesn't sound like the most fitting thing for a giant robot anime", adding that "everyone was already sick of 'Fly Me to the Moon' anyway". Reviewing Evangelion: 2.22 You Can (Not) Advance for the same publication, Theron Martin called "Beautiful World" "a winner". Real Sound writer Satoru Ryūsei described "Beautiful World" as a celebrated song that graced the first two Rebuild of Evangelion films. At the 22nd Japan Gold Disc Awards, "Beautiful World" received one of the Best 5 Songs by Download on PC awards. Its music video won Best Video from a Film at the 2008 MTV Video Music Awards Japan. Animate Times editor Yonezawa suggested that Utada's selection for Evangelion: 1.0 You Are (Not) Alone may have marked a turning point in the franchise's appeal to a broader audience beyond anime fans. Cultural anthropologist Taisaku Tsuru similarly cited Utada's selection as theme-song artist as emblematic of Evangelion's development into part of Japanese youth culture and its establishment as an enduring presence in Japanese society.

== Commercial performance ==
"Beautiful World/Kiss & Cry" entered the Oricon Singles Chart at number three. The following week, it rose to number two, bringing its cumulative sales to approximately 145,000. The single also reached the top 20 of Billboard's Japanese singles chart. On Oricon, it remained in the top ten for another two weeks, ultimately spending 26 weeks in the top 200. It ranked 20th on Oricon's 2007 year-end chart. The Recording Industry Association of Japan (RIAJ) certified "Beautiful World/Kiss & Cry" platinum for shipments of at least 250,000 physical copies. In September 2007, Utada's "Fly Me to the Moon (In Other Words) -2007 Mix-" also topped a list of the most-downloaded songs published by Newtype. The RIAJ certified "Beautiful World" million for at least one million full-track downloads and double platinum for 500,000 ringtone downloads.

In 2009, "Beautiful World" reached number eight on the Billboard Japan Hot 100. "Beautiful World -PLANiTb Acoustica Mix-" subsequently topped a download ranking published in the October 2009 issue of Newtype. The RIAJ later certified the remix platinum for at least 250,000 single-track downloads. Following the release of Evangelion: 3.0+1.0 Thrice Upon a Time in March 2021, "Beautiful World (Da Capo Version)" registered 6,272 downloads in Billboard Japan's midweek tracking report, placing fourth on Download Songs. It finished its first tracking week at number four on the Download Songs chart with 11,883 downloads. It also debuted at number nine on the Billboard Japan Hot Animation chart, ranking second in downloads, eighth on Twitter, and ninth in streaming among its component metrics. The song additionally debuted at number 54 on Streaming Songs and number 14 on Hot Buzz Song. The following week, "Beautiful World (Da Capo Version)" remained in the Hot Animation top ten, slipping one position to number ten.

== Track listings ==
"Beautiful World" / "Kiss & Cry" single
No.	Title	Writer(s)	Length
1.	"Beautiful World"	Utada	5:18
2.	"Kiss & Cry"	Utada	5:07
3.	"Fly Me to the Moon (In Other Words) (2007 Mix)"	Bart Howard	3:24
4.	"Beautiful World (Original Karaoke)"	Utada	5:15
5.	"Kiss & Cry (Original Karaoke)"	Utada	5:08
6.	"Fly Me to the Moon (In Other Words) (2007 Mix) (Original Karaoke)"	Howard	3:23
Total length:			27:35

All tracks are written by Hikaru Utada.

"Beautiful World (Planitb Acoustica Mix)" digital download
No.	Title	Length
1.	"Beautiful World (Planitb Acoustica Mix)"	5:15
Total length:		5:15

== Personnel ==
Personnel details were sourced from "Beautiful World" / "Kiss & Cry"'s liner notes booklet.

- Goetz B. for 365 Artists – mixing
- Atsushi Matsui – recording
- Akira Miyake – production
- Alexis Smith – additional programming
- Yuzuru Tomita – additional programming
- Hikaru Utada – arrangement, keyboards, programming, production, songwriting, vocals
- Teruzane Utada – production

== Chart rankings ==
=== Weekly charts ===
Chart (2007)	Peak position
Japan Singles (Oricon): "Beautiful World" / "Kiss & Cry"	2
Japan (RIAJ Reco-kyō Ringtone Chart)	2

Chart (2009)	Peak position
Billboard Japan Hot 100	8
RIAJ Digital Track Chart Top 100	59
RIAJ Digital Track Chart Top 100 "Beautiful World -Planitb Acoustica Mix-"	8

=== Yearly charts ===
Chart (2007)	Position
Japan Singles (Oricon) "Beautiful World" / "Kiss & Cry"	20

== Certifications ==
Certifications for "Beautiful World"
Region	Certification	Certified units/sales
Japan (RIAJ) Physical single	Platinum	250,000^{^}
Japan (RIAJ) Digital	Million	1,000,000^{*}
Japan (RIAJ) Ringtone	2× Platinum	500,000^{*}
Japan (RIAJ) PC download	Platinum	250,000^{*}
Japan (RIAJ) Full-length ringtone	Gold	100,000^{*}
Streaming
Japan (RIAJ)	Platinum	100,000,000^{†}
^{*} Sales figures based on certification alone.^{†} Streaming-only figures based on certification alone.
