= Kiss and cry =

Area to wait for scores in figure skating rinks

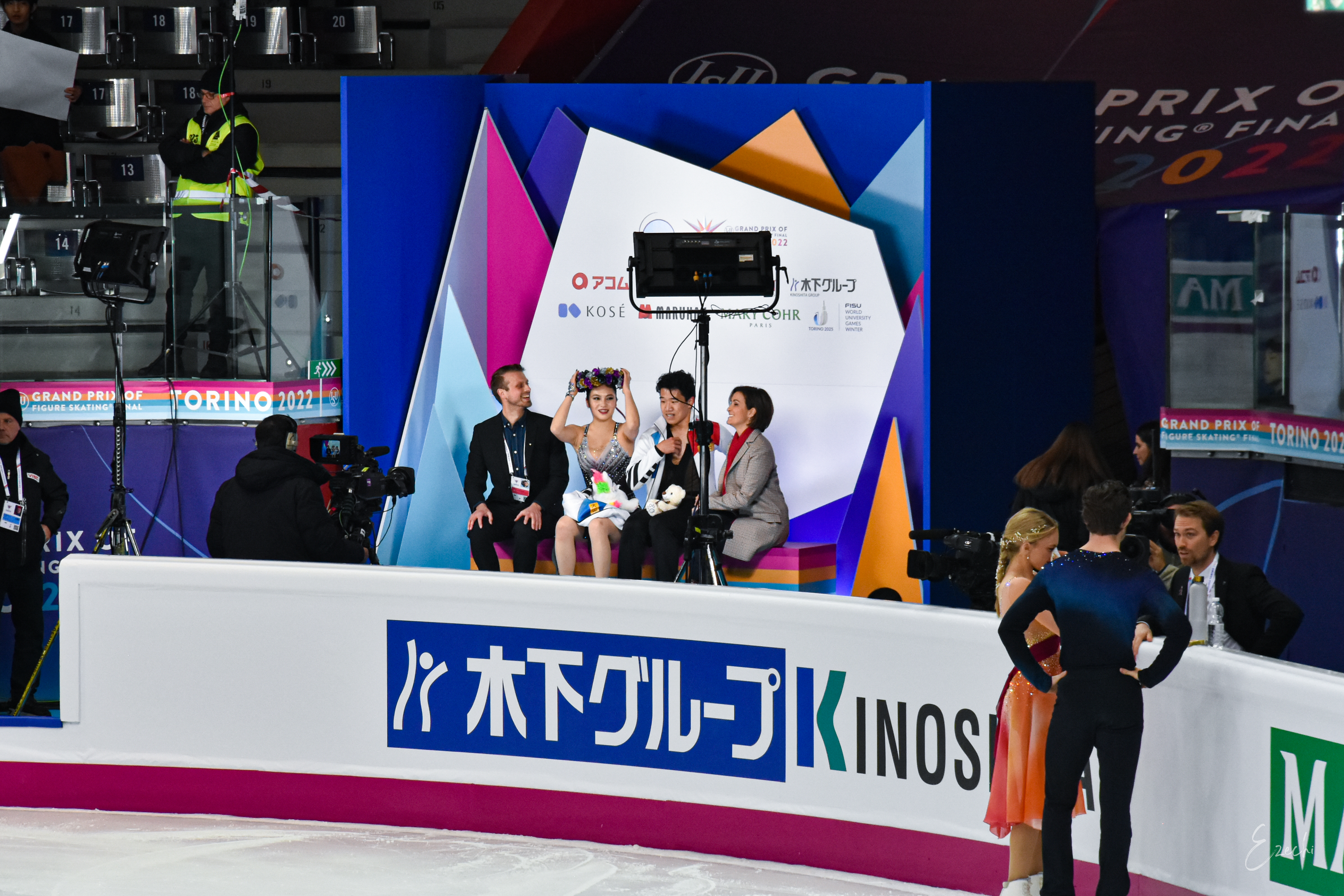
The kiss & cry at the 2022 Figure Skating Grand Prix Final

The kiss and cry is the area in a figure skating rink where figure skaters wait for their marks to be announced after their performances during a figure skating competition. It is so named because the skaters and coaches often kiss to celebrate after a good performance, or cry after a poor one. The area is usually located in the corner or end of the rink and is furnished with a bench or chairs for the skaters and coaches and monitors to display the competition results. It is often elaborately decorated with flowers or some other backdrop for television shots and photos of the skaters as they react to their performance and scores.

The term was coined by Jane Erkko, a Finnish figure skating official who was on the organizing committee for the 1983 World Figure Skating Championships which were held in Helsinki. Erkko came up with the name when visiting television technicians who were mapping the arena prior to the event wanted to know what the area was called. The first formal off-ice waiting area at the Olympics appeared in Sarajevo 1984. The term "kiss and cry" was widely used by the early 1990s, and is now officially a part of the International Skating Union Regulations. Showing the "kiss and cry" area has personalized the sport and has helped make figure skating more popular in televised Olympic competition. Many national federations, including the Americans, train skaters on how they should appear on camera while waiting.

A kiss and cry area is now featured at some gymnastics competitions.
