= Fight the Blues =

Promotional single by Hikaru Utada

from the album Heart Station
- Released: March 27, 2008
- Recorded: 2007
- Genre: J-pop, R&B, synthpop
- Length: 4:10
- Label: EMI Music Japan
- Songwriter: Hikaru Utada
- Producer: Hikaru Utada

"Fight the Blues" is Hikaru Utada's second Japanese digital single and 29th single overall. It was released on March 27, 2008. "Fight the Blues" was tied-in as the CM song for the program 報道特集NEXT (News Report NEXT) for their seventh studio album Heart Station. This digital single reached number one in virtually every online music store in Japan prior to the Heart Station album's release, including the most used store in Japan, iTunes Japan, as well as OnGen, among others.

== Track list ==
No.	Title	Length
1.	"Fight the Blues"	4:10

== Chart rankings ==
Chart	Peak position
Billboard Japan Hot 100	1
RIAJ Reco-kyō ringtones Top 100	53
