= Kiss & Cry (song) =

2007 song by Hikaru Utada

- "Beautiful World" / "Kiss & Cry" cover

Single by Hikaru Utada

from the album Heart Station
- A-side: "Beautiful World"
- Released: May 31, 2007
- Recorded: 2007
- Studio: Bunkamura Studios; EMI Music Japan Studios; (Shibuya, Tokyo)
- Genre: R&B
- Length: 5:06
- Label: EMI Music Japan
- Songwriter: Hikaru Utada
- Producers: Hikaru Utada; Akira Miyake; Teruzane Utada

Hikaru Utada singles chronology
"Flavor of Life" (2007)	"Kiss & Cry" (2007)	"Beautiful World" (2007)

Music video
- "Kiss & Cry" on YouTube

"Kiss & Cry" is a song recorded by Japanese-American recording artist Hikaru Utada for their seventh studio and fifth Japanese album, Heart Station (2007). It was written, composed, and arranged by Utada, whilst production was handled by Utada, Teruzane Utada, and Akira Miyake. The single premiered on May 31, 2007 as the third single from the album in Japan. It was re-released as a double A-side single with "Beautiful World", which also appeared on the parent album on August 29 in Japan, and digitally worldwide. Musically, "Kiss & Cry" is an R&B song, influenced by pop and hip-hop music. Lyrically, it discusses both Utada's upbringing and social beliefs between both Western and oriental regions.

Upon its release, the track garnered generally favorable reviews from music critics. Many critics agreed that it was one of the better singles from the album, and complimented its R&B composition. Charting as an A-side single, it achieved success in Japan, peaking at number two on the Oricon Singles Chart. The single has been certified within four different categories by the Recording Industry Association of Japan (RIAJ). An accompanying music video was shot by Toshitaka Shinoda; it features animation in the style of Nissin's Freedom Project, including major characters such as the protagonist Takeru lip-synching to the song. The song had been promoted through several Japanese commercials and television shows.

== Background and release ==
On April 23, 2007, American website Jame World confirmed the release of a new single, entitled "Kiss & Cry". The song's original working title was "Dancing Leah", which is a reference to Filipina American model Leah Dizon. It was written, composed, and arranged by Utada, whilst production was handled by Utada, Teruzane Utada, and Akira Miyake. For the song, Hikaru had played the keyboards and synthesizers, and provided backing vocals. It was originally recorded for their studio album Ultra Blue by Atsushi Matsui at Bunkamura Studios and EMI Music Japan Studios, Shibuya, Tokyo in 2007, but the idea was scrapped for unknown reasons. The finished composition was then mastered by American music engineer Ted Jensen at Sterling Studios, New York City, New York. The single also included the A-side track "Beautiful World", which also appeared on Utada's seventh studio and fifth Japanese album, Heart Station (2007).

It premiered as a promotional single on April 20, 2007, and debuted on Japanese radio on May 21. It was served as the third single from the album on May 31. Both singles were then released as a physical single on August 29 in Japan, and digitally worldwide. The CD single contains both "Beautiful World" and "Kiss & Cry", plus their instrumental versions. It also contains a remixed version of Utada's 1999 cover version of the 1954 Kaye Ballard song, "Fly Me to the Moon (In Other Words)"; its instrumental version was also included on the CD format. Utada's 1999 cover was originally included on their single "Wait & See (Risk)". The artwork to "Kiss & Cry" features Utada sitting on a ledge at the bottom of a concrete garage building, while motion-blurred school children walk past them. The CD features an extra lyric booklet, printed on plain white paper. The song was used as the theme song for the Nissin Cup Noodles product, which was released in Japan.

== Composition ==
"Kiss & Cry (song)"
A 30-second sample of "Kiss & Cry". Musically, "Kiss & Cry" is an R&B song, influenced by pop and electronic music. It has been compared to Utada's previous R&B music, as according to music critics.

Musically, "Kiss & Cry" is an R&B song, influenced by pop and electronic music. According to the sheet music published at Music.j-total.net, the song is written in the key of F minor, the song pre-chorus is interpolated the verses of their song "Hotel Lobby" from the 2004 English studio album Exodus. During the first and second verse and pre-chorus, the song follows a key sequence of F minor. Through the first, second and third chorus, the song has a sequence of A#m_{7}–D#m_{7}–E–D#m_{7}. During the bridge section, the key sequence changes to A#m_{7}–C_{7}–F minor. It opens with a percussion section that includes a drum machine and cymbals; it then carries on with Palm Products GmbH synthesizers and keyboards, as described by a member at Selective Hearing. In an interview with MSN Hotmail in 2008, Utada said about the song; "I wanted to write quite a lively song and after writing it, I still feel that this has the most energetic feeling to it and that it’s probably the most polished song too." They personally enjoyed the end result of the song, as they described the arrangement and lyrical content, and cited it one of their favorite songs form the album. A reviewer from Selective Hearing said that the song "sound[s] like throw backs to her R&B days." The editor analyzed the song's music structure, and said that the "sample at the beginning sounds like it might be from a Godzilla movie."

Amanda Walujono from Audrey Magazine felt that, while the song had a "danceable beat", "it’s not exactly club material." CD Journal staff members noted elements of hip hop music, and identified instrumentation of horns, keyboards and a drum machine. Utada described the lyrical content as a tie between both their "Western and oriental beliefs", and believed that people surrounded by Western culture tend to "follow their destiny", whilst people growing up around Asian culture believe that destiny is "pre-determined". CD Journal staff members felt the lyrical delivery expressed both "joy" and "sorrow" topics. The title also references the ice skating area of the same name, where "Kiss" expresses "joy", and "cry" expresses "sorrow". The second chorus of the single's lyrics references the Nissin Noodle product ("Tonight I'll have Nissin Cup Noodle").

== Critical response ==
"Kiss & Cry" received positive reviews from music critics. A reviewer from Selective Hearing was positive in their review, labeling it a "very catchy track". They also selected it as one of the best track on the album. CD Journal reviewers noted the song's "surprising introduction", and described the song as an "impressive R&B tune with a heavy beat". Tomoyuki Mori from Amazon was positive in his review, complimenting Utada's songwriting and production. He also praised the "gorgeous atmospheric" composition, and labelled it "charming". Tetsuo Hiraga from Hot Express described the song as "fun", and highlighted its composition as a strong factor to its overall delivery. However, Daniel Robson, who wrote for The Japan Times, felt its inclusion into Heart Station was disappointing as he quoted, "[After opening track "Fight the Blues"] it’s followed by a run of five previous singles and a short, dull interlude track, which just feels so lazy." He felt the inclusion, alongside other singles, made him question the value of the overall album.

"Kiss & Cry" has achieved several accolades from several different publications and organisations. Amanda Walujono from Audrey Magazine ranked the song at number four on her "Top 5 Hikaru Utada Songs", praising the composition and "danceable beat". In December 2015, in honor of Utada's comeback into the music business, Japanese website Goo.ne.jp hosted a poll for fans to rank their favorite songs by Utada out of 25 positions; the poll was held in only twenty-four hours, and thousands submitted their votes. As a result, "Kiss & Cry" was ranked at number 24. In October 2007, Utada became the highest selling digital artist in Japan, based on the sales of "Kiss & Cry", and two other album singles "Flavor of Life" and "Beautiful World"; they sold over 10 million digital units according to Listen Japan.

== Commercial performance ==
Charting together as an A-side single, "Beautiful World" and "Kiss & Cry" debuted at number three on Japan's Oricon Singles Chart on the chart week of September 10, 2007; it sold 93,518 units in its first week of sales. The following week, it rose to its peak position of number two; it sold 51,637 units. It stayed in the top ten for two more weeks, until it fell to number 12 on June 1. It stayed in the top 40 for eight weeks, and charted at number 100 during the two-week New Years entries; it sold 1,689 for its two-week accumulation of sales. In total, the A-side singles stayed in the Top 200 chart for 26 weeks, one of their longest charting singles according to Oricon. By the end of 2007, the single was ranked at number 20 on Oricon's Annual 2007 chart; it sold 230,287 units by the end of the year. This became Utada's second highest entry in that annual chart, behind "Flavor of Life" at number two, and both entries made them the highest selling female artist. As of April 2016, the A-side single has sold 245,050 units in Japan, and is their 18th best selling single according to Oricon Database.

The single was certified platinum in September 2007 by the Recording Industry Association of Japan (RIAJ) for physical shipments of 250,000 units in Japan. Although it failed to chart on any digital charts in Japan, or on Billboard's Japan Hot 100 and competent charts, the song was certified gold by the RIAJ for digital sales of 100,000 units. "Kiss & Cry" charted at number 11 on the RIAJ Reco-kyō Singles Chart, during the chart week of October 20, 2007. It then received a double platinum certification in November 2007 by the RIAJ for ringtone downloads from Chaku-Uta stores, exceeding sales of 500,000 units. The song received a gold certification by the RIAJ for full ringtone purchases of 100,000 units, and tallied the overall sales of the single to 935,000 units in Japan.

== Music video and promotion ==
An animated music video was produced for the song, directed by Toshitaka Shinoda. It was unveiled on August 2, 2007, when it was uploaded to Utada's EMI Music Japan website. The video featured animation in the style of Nissin's Freedom OVA and commercials, including major characters such as the protagonist Takeru lip-synching to the song. The project was a joint collaboration for the Freedom project and Nissin Cup Noodle as a celebration of their 35th anniversary. The music video received negative reviews from critics. A review from Halcyin Realms criticized the production of the video, stating "The so called 'rough cut' was a grotesquely put together, random collection of footages lifted from the Freedom series, with lip movement from the characters eerily synced to Utada’s vocals..." For promotional activities, Utada performed the song live on Japanese music television series Music Station on August 31, 2007.

== Track listings and formats ==
- Japanese CD single
1. "Beautiful World" – 5:18
2. "Kiss & Cry" – 5:08
3. "Fly Me to the Moon (In Other Words)" (2007 Mix) – 3:24
4. "Beautiful World" (Original Karaoke) – 5:18
5. "Kiss & Cry" (Original Karaoke) – 5:08
6. "Fly Me to the Moon (In Other Words)" (2007 Mix) (Original Karaoke) – 3:24
- Digital download
1. "Beautiful World" – 5:18
2. "Kiss & Cry" – 5:08
3. "Fly Me to the Moon (In Other Words)" (2007 Mix) – 3:24

== Credits and personnel ==
Credits adapted from the liner notes of the Heart Station album.

Recording and management

- Recorded by Atsushi Matsui at Bunkamura Studios and EMI Music Japan Studios, Shibuya, Tokyo, 2007.

Credits

- Hikaru Utada – arrangement, keyboards, programming, production, songwriting, vocals
- Goetz B. for 365 Artists – mixing
- Atsushi Matsui – recording
- Akira Miyake – production
- Yuzuru Tomita – additional programming
- Ted Jensen – engineer
- Teruzane Utada – production

== Charts and certifications ==
=== Charts ===
Chart (2007)	Peak position
Japan Daily Chart (Oricon)	1
Japan Weekly Chart (Oricon)	2
Japan Monthly Chart (Oricon)	3
Japan Ringtone Charts (RIAJ)	11

=== Year-end charts ===
Chart (2007)	Peak position
Japan Yearly Chart (Oricon)	20

== Certifications ==
Region	Certification	Certified units/sales
Japan (RIAJ) Beautiful World / Kiss & Cry	Platinum	245,050
Japan (RIAJ) Full-length ringtone	Gold	100,000^{*}
Japan (RIAJ) Ringtone	2× Platinum	500,000^{*}
Japan (RIAJ) PC download	Gold	100,000^{^}
^{*} Sales figures based on certification alone.^{^} Shipments figures based on certification alone.

== Release history ==
Region	Date	Format	Label
Japan	April 20, 2007	Ringtone download	Toshiba-EMI
Japan	May 21, 2007	Airplay	Toshiba-EMI
Japan	May 31, 2007	Cellphone download	Toshiba-EMI
Japan	June 1, 2007	Digital download	Toshiba-EMI
Japan	August 29, 2007	CD single	Toshiba-EMI
United States	August 29, 2007	Digital download	EMI Music Japan
Australia	August 29, 2007	Digital download	EMI Music Japan
New Zealand	August 29, 2007	Digital download	EMI Music Japan
Canada	August 29, 2007	Digital download	EMI Music Japan
United Kingdom	August 29, 2007	Digital download	EMI Music Japan
Germany	August 29, 2007	Digital download	EMI Music Japan
Ireland	August 29, 2007	Digital download	EMI Music Japan
France	August 29, 2007	Digital download	EMI Music Japan
Spain	August 29, 2007	Digital download	EMI Music Japan
Taiwan	August 29, 2007	Digital download	EMI Music Japan
South Korea	August 30, 2007	Digital download	Universal Music Korea
Taiwan	August 31, 2007	CD single	Gold Typhoon
