= Heart Station =

Studio album by Hikaru Utada
- Released: March 19, 2008
- Recorded: 2006–2008
- Studios: Bunkamura Studios, Shibuya, Tokyo; EMI Music Japan Studios, Shibuya, Tokyo
- Genres: J-pop; R&B; electronica
- Length: 56:54
- Labels: Eastworld; EMI Music Japan
- Producers: Hikaru Utada; Miyake Akira; Teruzane Utada

Hikaru Utada chronology
Ultra Blue (2006)	Heart Station (2008)	This Is the One (2009)

Singles from Heart Station
- 1. "Boku wa Kuma" Released: November 22, 2006; 2. "Flavor of Life" Released: February 28, 2007; 3. "Kiss & Cry" Released: May 31, 2007; 4. "Beautiful World" Released: August 29, 2007; 5. "Heart Station / Stay Gold" Released: February 20, 2008; 6. "Fight the Blues" Released: March 27, 2008; 7. "Prisoner of Love" Released: May 21, 2008

Heart Station is the seventh studio album and fifth Japanese-language album by Japanese-American recording artist Hikaru Utada. It was released on March 19, 2008, by EMI Music Japan sublabel Eastworld, and globally on March 26, 2008. It is Utada's eighth consecutive studio album to be fully written and produced by them, with the co-production completed by Teruzane Utada and long-time collaborator Miyake Akira. Recorded between 2006 and 2008, it was worked on whilst they were recording their ninth studio and second English-language studio album, This Is the One (2009). With the album artwork photographed by Japanese photographer Mitsuo, Heart Station was released in two formats: a physical CD, and as a digital download.

Upon its release, Heart Station received very positive reviews from music critics, who commended the production, songwriting, and Utada's musical direction and vocal performance. However, minor criticism was aimed towards the lack of innovation and surprise-value of the album's material. Commercially, the album was a success in Japan; it peaked at number one on the Oricon Albums Chart, and was ranked the fifth best-selling studio album of 2008. With over one million sales as of June 2011, it is ranked amongst the highest selling albums in Japan of all time.

Seven singles were released from the album; "Flavor of Life", "Beautiful World", and "Prisoner of Love" sold over one million units, while "Flavor of Life" is ranked as one of the best selling singles of all time. They performed several songs from Heart Station on various Japanese television shows, including Music Station, Music Fighter, amongst others. Since its release, Heart Station has broken records and has been awarded several accolades.

== Background and composition ==
Heart Station is Utada's eighth consecutive studio album to be fully written and produced by them. It was announced on October 23, 2007, where Utada confirmed via their blog that they had been through development of two new studio albums: one Japanese-language, and the other English-language. They also stated that approximately 60 percent of the album had been recorded, at the time of their blog entry. The demo versions were recorded at Utada's home in Tokyo, and some songs had been mixed that same day, but the final album compositions were then recorded by Matsui Atushi at Bunkamura Studios and EMI Music Japan studios in Tokyo, Japan. By mid-January 2008, the final songs from Heart Station were mixed at Bunkamura Studios by Goetz B, and were mastered between February 1–6, 2008, by music engineer Ted Jensen at Sterling Sound Studios, New York City; this was Utada's ninth consecutive album to be mastered by Jensen. Two months prior to the album's release, Japanese publications reported a new album by Utada, and was confirmed by Japanese music magazine CD Journal, alongside the track list.

Musically, Heart Station is a pop album, as described by an editor at Rolling Stone Japan. According to staff members at Selective Hearing, they said of the album's musical style; "This album continues the experimental sound set by her previous disc Ultra Blue but in a more commercial friendly manner." During an interview with MSN in 2002, Utada intended to go for a more "simple" approach for the album; they stated, "From the beginning, I had always intended to make this album easier to listen to so anyone can enjoy it. I always aimed for a simple melody, simple lyrics and a simple message rather than overcomplicating it all. But overall, I had a lot of fun making this album. It’s got quite a masculine feel to it but that’s because that’s the way I am at the moment. It’s got quite a nice feeling to it I think."

== Songs ==
The album opens with "Fight the Blues", which was described by Daniel Robson at The Japan Times as the album's most "rewarding track"; he further said "understated strings and warm electronics give the song an ethereal feel." "Heart Station", one of the album's singles, is a "soft" pop song that lyrically discusses about love and communication between lovers. "Beautiful World" is another love song, but is inspired by mid-tempo house and dance music, as noted by Amazon staff members. The fourth track is the ballad version of "Flavor of Life", which was arranged and composed by Utada. According to staff members at CD Journal, it is an adult contemporary pop song that showcases "slow" string arrangements.

"Stay Gold" is an electronic pop song that includes a "gently rippling keyboard line"; its lyrical content talks about various subjects including love, family, and friends. "Kiss & Cry" is an R&B song, influenced by pop and electronic music. According to a reviewer at Selective Hearing, they said that the song "sound[s] like throw backs to her R&B days." The reviewer analyzed the song's music structure, and said that the "sample at the beginning sounds like it might be from a Godzilla movie." They later progressed by saying, "'Kiss & Cry' has a very strong percussion section led by the booming kick drum & high pitched cymbals. It’s also got some slick synth work (kind of sounds like a Palm Products GmbH)." The seventh track is an ambient house interlude entitled "Gentle Beast Interlude" that lasts one minute and 13 seconds; it samples sections from the singles of Heart Station. The next recorded track is the dance-pop "Celebrate", which was originally titled "Yakekuso (やけくそ, Desperation)".

"Prisoner of Love" is a love song that follows an R&B influence; Utada stated that the song was inspired the rest of the album's "honest" theme, and recognised it as their return to R&B music. Regarding the theme of death, Utada said that cutting off the ending of the song "Take 5" abruptly gives it a "sudden" feel. "Boku wa Kuma" is the 11th track, and was described negatively by Daniel Robson, writing for The Japan Times, as "a sweet throwaway children's song that kills the album’s melancholy vibe stone dead." "Nijiiro Bus" was described by Utada as a "cute" song; they further stated, "I made this song using my childhood memories and all sorts of other nostalgic thoughts." The final song on the album that was selected as a bonus track is the original version of "Flavor of Life", which was described by CD Journal as more "glittery" and "polished" than the ballad version.

== Release ==
Heart Station was released on March 19, 2008, by EMI Music Japan and Eastworld in Japan, and Gold Typhoon in Taiwan. It included the thirteen recorded songs on one disc, and featured an extra lyrical booklet. It was then released in South Korea by EMI Music and Eastworld, but included an extra Korean-language lyrical booklet. Not long after its release in Asian territories, EMI Music reserved rights to distribute the album in Canada and the United States on April 8, 2008. This is Utada's second studio album to be released in North America, following Ultra Blue. Heart Station later became Utada's second studio album to be released in several global territories, including Germany, Australia, New Zealand, France, and Spain, amongst others. (Note: See the Release date table below to see more.) The images on Heart Station were photographed by Mitsuo, and features a close-up of Utada in a white polo shirt for the front cover.

== Promotion ==
Utada promoted Heart Station with several special interviews, radio hosting, and other appearances. They made an appearance in Rockin'On Japan magazine in Japan, their first interview with them in six years. On February 19, 2008, Japanese television network Space Shower hosted a 60-minute interview entitled "V.I.P. Utada"; it featured Utada talking about the album. Then in March 2008, EMI Music Japan hosted a special website to promote the album; it includes previews of each track, radio appearances and schedules for live performances and magazine appearances. The album tracks: "Beautiful World", "Fight the Blues", "Flavor of Life", the title track, "Kiss & Cry", "Prisoner of Love", "Stay Gold", and "Boku wa Kuma" were all used as theme songs through several commercials in Japan, including Music.jp and Fuji TV television series. The album was not promoted with a concert tour, but some tracks were performed on Utada's Wild Life concert tour in December 2010.

=== Singles ===
Eight singles were released from the album, including two double A-sides and one digital-only release. The first single was "Boku wa Kuma", which was released on November 22, 2006, on two physical and digital formats. It was promoted through children television shows including Minna no Uta, whilst selected formats of the single included a photo book that features drawings by Utada. Both the ballad and original versions of "Flavor of Life" were released together on physical and digital formats on February 28, 2007. The single was a huge success in Japan, peaking at number one on the Oricon Singles Chart, and sold 650,510 units; it was certified platinum for physical shipments of 250,000 units, and both individual songs were certified in several categories by the Recording Industry Association of Japan (RIAJ). Due to the song's success in Japan, it sold over eight million units altogether and is one of the best selling singles of all time.

The third single "Kiss & Cry" was originally released on May 31, 2007, as a promotional single in Japan, but later served as an A-side with the song "Beautiful World" on August 29. Although both songs achieved success together and individually in Japan, "Beautiful World" was certified million by the RIAJ for exceeding over one million digital downloads. The next A-side single was "Heart Station"/"Stay Gold", which was released on February 20, 2008. Despite selling well through digital sales, it became Utada's first single release to not sell 100,000 physical units in Japan. "Fight the Blues" was the album's only digital single; it was scheduled to be released on March 26, 2008, but was pushed back to April 8. It reached number one on the Japan Hot 100 chart, and 53 on Japan's top ringtone sales chart. The album's eighth and final single, "Prisoner of Love", was released on May 21, 2008. It became the album's third single to sell over one million units through digital sales, but was still unable to sell over 100,000 physical units in Japan.

== Critical reception ==
Professional ratings
Review scores
Source	Rating
Amazon	(positive)
CD Journal	(positive)
Hot Express	(mixed)
The Japan Times	(mixed)
Rolling Stone Japan	5/5 stars
Selective Hearing	(positive)

Upon its release, Heart Station received positive reviews from most music critics. An editor writing for Rolling Stone Japan awarded the album a complete five star rating, commending the album's "extremely high" quality. The editor also complimented Utada's song writing and composition, and finally highlighted "Beautiful World" as the album's best song. In another positive review, a member at Amazon highlighted the singles as the album's better cuts, but recommended "Boku wa Kuma" as the top track. Similarly, a staff member at CD Journal selected the singles as the best songs on the album, labelling the quality as "lavish". Although the album was not reviewed on the American website AllMusic, staff member David Jefferies highlighted the tracks "Beautiful World", "Flavor of Life", the title track, "Prisoner of Love", "Stay Gold", and "Take 5" as some of Utada's greatest songs. Selective Hearing staff members praised the composition and single releases. The members also highlighted the fact that they could "hear half the album through single releases." In conclusion, they said "This is totally worth picking up."

Nevertheless, the album was also criticized, mainly for its apparent lack of innovation and having at least half of the album filled with singles, as stated by Daniel Robson from The Japan Times. He further explained, "But really, when you unwrap your ¥3,059 copy of Heart Station and realize that seven of the 13 tracks have been released as singles or B-sides, stretching back 16 months, you may feel a little short-changed." Through he identified this as a "common practice" in Japan, he complimented their vocals and highlighted "Fight the Blues" as the album's best track. He also described the production of the single releases as "lazy".

Tetsuo Hiraga from Hot Express was mixed in his review. Though he praised Utada's production on most tracks, he criticized her "merely exaggerated" song writing and vocal abilities, and called most of the music "tiring". Despite this, in conclusion, he stated that the album offers "some impact" to the listener. Although reviewing their 2009 album This Is the One, The Gaysian.com editor Ekin considered it "disappointing" that Heart Station "contained a very simplistic sound with not much emphasis on rich sounds."

== Commercial performance ==
Commercially, Heart Station was a success in Japan. It debuted at number one on both the Daily and Weekly Oricon Albums Chart, with 480,081 units sold in its first week of sales, making it the highest selling album by a female artist based on first week sales of 2008. Despite the album becoming Utada's fifth Japanese and seventh studio album to peak atop the charts, it resulted in being their lowest first week sales of their career. However, it also made Utada the second musical act, tied with Japanese group Checkers, Kinki Kids, and singer Hikaru Kenji, to have had all six of their studio albums to debut at number one since their debut. In its second week, it fell to number two and sold 135,857 units. The following it, it fell again to number seven, and sales slipped to 59,935 units. The album stayed inside the top 10 for 10 consecutive weeks, and lasted 55 weeks on the album charts.

Digitally, the album was success on Japan's Top iTunes Album Chart during late March 2008, peaking at number one. It debuted at number one on Billboard Japans Top Album Sales Chart, during the chart week of March 31, 2008; this was Utada's first album to peak at number one since the charts establishment in 2008. In South Korea, though the album failed to chart on the Gaon Albums Chart or any relative charts, it was certified platinum by Gaon and sold over 10,247 units; this marks it one of Utada's best selling albums in that country, and outside of Japan. In the United States, although it failed to chart on the Billboard 200 chart, it reached number 58 on their iTunes Top Albums chart; this was one of the highest ranking albums by a Japanese recording artist at the time. By May 13, Japanese website Barks.jp report that the digital sales of every songs from Heart Station accumulated to 15 million sales collectively.

The album was also success on yearly ranking charts across Asia. On December 2, Tower Records ranked Heart Station as the second best selling album of 2008, behind Best Fiction by Japanese recording artist Namie Amuro. Despite not making the top spot, it was the highest selling studio album on their list. One day later, iTunes Japan listed the album as the highest selling album of 2008. Then in late December, Oricon Style listed the album as the fifth best selling album of 2008 in Japan, selling a total of 997,536 units; despite this entry, it was the highest selling studio album by a female artist. Since its release, it has sold 1,011,373 units according to Oricon Style, and was certified million by the Recording Industry Association of Japan (RIAJ) for shipments of one million units; this is Utada's seventh album to achieve a million award, and is currently their fifth best selling album by Oricon's database. As of June 2016, it is the 275th best selling album of all time in Japan.

== Track listing ==
All tracks are written by Hikaru Utada.

CD and digital download
No.	Title	Length
1.	"Fight the Blues"	4:10
2.	"Heart Station"	4:36
3.	"Beautiful World"	5:17
4.	"Flavor of Life (Ballad Version)"	5:25
5.	"Stay Gold"	5:14
6.	"Kiss & Cry"	5:06
7.	"Gentle Beast Interlude"	1:13
8.	"Celebrate"	4:26
9.	"Prisoner of Love"	4:46
10.	"Teiku 5 (テイク 5, Take 5)"	3:42
11.	"Boku wa Kuma (ぼくはくま, I am a Bear)"	2:23
12.	"Niji-iro Basu (虹色バス, Rainbow-colored Bus)"	5:50
13.	"Flavor of Life" (bonus track)	4:46
Total length:		56:54

== Personnel ==
Credits and personnel adapted from Heart Station liner notes.

- Hikaru Utada – vocals, background vocals, songwriting, production, composing, arranging, mixing, programming, keyboards, strings
- Teruzane Utada – production
- Miyake Akira – production, executive producer
- Tsuyoshi Kon – acoustic guitar
- Alexis Smith – arranging
- Tomita Yuzuru – programming, arranging, strings
- Yamamoto Takuo – strings
- Okamoto Hiroshi – piano
- Kinbara Chieko Strings – strings
- Chinen Teruyuki – acoustic guitar
- Tsunemi Kazuhide – programming
- Matsui Atsushi – mixing
- Hachisuka Toshibiro – engineering
- Miyamoto Takahide – engineering
- Miyata Fumio – engineering
- Doyama Shoji – executive producer
- Ted Jensen – mixing, engineering, mastering
- Goetz B. – mixing

== Charts ==
=== Weekly charts ===
Chart (2008–09)	Peak position
Japanese Albums (Oricon)	1
Japanese Top Albums (Billboard Japan)	1

=== Monthly charts ===
Chart (2008)	Peak position
Japanese Albums (Oricon)	2

=== Year-end charts ===
Chart (2008)	Position
Japanese Albums (Oricon)	5

=== Decade-end charts ===
Chart (2000–2009)	Position
Japanese Albums (Oricon)	94

=== All-time charts ===
Chart	Position
Japanese Albums (Oricon)	275

== Certification ==
Region	Certification	Certified units/sales
Japan (RIAJ)	Million	1,011,373
South Korea	—	4,132

== Release history ==
Region	Date	Format	Label
Japan	March 19, 2008	CD	EMI Music Japan; Eastworld
Taiwan	March 19, 2008	CD	Gold Typhoon; Miya Records
Japan	March 19, 2008	Digital download	EMI Music Japan; Eastworld
Australia	March 26, 2008	Digital download	EMI Music Japan; Virgin
New Zealand	March 26, 2008	Digital download	EMI Music Japan; Virgin
United Kingdom	March 26, 2008	Digital download	EMI Music Japan; Virgin
Germany	March 26, 2008	Digital download	EMI Music Japan; Virgin
Ireland	March 26, 2008	Digital download	EMI Music Japan; Virgin
France	March 26, 2008	Digital download	EMI Music Japan; Virgin
Spain	March 26, 2008	Digital download	EMI Music Japan; Virgin
Taiwan	March 26, 2008	Digital download	EMI Music Japan; Virgin
United States	March 26, 2008	Digital download	EMI Music Japan; Virgin
Canada	March 26, 2008	Digital download	EMI Music Japan; Virgin
South Korea	March 29, 2008	CD	EMI Music; Eastworld
United States	April 8, 2008	CD	EMI Music US
Canada	April 8, 2008	CD	EMI Music Canada
