= Flavor of Life =

Single by Hikaru Utada

from the album Heart Station
- Released: February 28, 2007
- Recorded: 2006
- Genre: Synth-pop (original version); Pop, R&B (ballad version)
- Length: 5:25
- Label: EMI Music Japan
- Songwriter: Hikaru Utada
- Producer: Utada

Hikaru Utada singles chronology
"Boku wa Kuma" (2006)	"Flavor of Life" (2007)	"Kiss & Cry" (2007)

Music video
- "Flavor of Life -Ballad Version-" on YouTube

"Flavor of Life" is Hikaru Utada's 18th Japanese single (25th single overall). The physical single was officially released on February 28, 2007.

Compared to the preceding singles following "Colors", "Flavor of Life" garnered far more success. This single is Utada's first single since 2003 to sell over 200,000 copies in its first week, the first single ever to sell over two million downloads before a physical format release, the first single to sell over five and a half million downloads total, the first single to top RIAJ downloads for three consecutive months, and the first song to be certified platinum for PC downloads in Japan. "Flavor Of Life" has become the highest selling Japanese download single of all time, with over 5,580,000 downloads by April 2007. On July 19, 2007, EMI disclosed "Flavor of Life" as a contender for most sold digital single of all time, with over 7.7 million downloads total.

There were three versions of the "Flavor of Life" that were released: "Flavor Of Life", "Flavor of Life -ballad version-" and "Flavor of Life -antidote mix-" (a CD-only exclusive). The ballad version of "Flavor of Life" was arranged by Utada as well as two other professionals; the original version was arranged by Utada, and the antidote mix of the song was arranged by Alexis Smith, who provided additional arrangement for Ultra Blue tracks such as "Keep Tryin'" and "This is Love".

The ballad version of "Flavor of Life" was featured as the insert song for the popular drama or dorama, Hana Yori Dango 2, which averaged over 21% viewership in its timeslot. In early 2006, the production team of the drama contacted Utada about an image song that would sound similar to "First Love". When the director wanted to express the heroine's wavering feelings, he said "'First Love' came into my mind", and so, a request was made to Utada.

This is Hikaru Utada's first drama tie-in since "Sakura Drops" in 2002. This is also their last physical single to be released under Toshiba EMI, before the British EMI Group purchased its remaining stake in the label from the Japanese Toshiba Corporation and was rebranded as EMI Music Japan.

== Mass reception ==
=== Digital success ===
The 45 second download of the ballad version of "Flavor Of Life" was released as a ring tone on January 6, 2007, on Chaku-Uta. The song debuted at number 14 the Chaku-Uta ring tone download chart, a great feat for one of the largest download stores in Japan. For reference, the main theme song from Hana Yori Dango 2, Arashi's "Love So Sweet", debuted at number 7.

On its second day of sales, "Flavor Of Life -ballad version-" jumped to the number five position on the download chart, where it quickly ascended to number one. On the ringtone's success alone, "Flavor of Life -ballad version-" was able to peak at number one on not only the ring tone chart, but also composite chaku-uta download chart.

Within five days of release, it was confirmed that "Flavor Of Life -ballad version-" had been downloaded as a ring tone over 100,000 times. These rapid and large sales figures only served to foreshadow the download success of the song.

Indeed, the song gained a great deal of momentum. Just two weeks later on January 25, 2007, figures were released that confirmed that the "Flavor Of Life -ballad version-" had sold in excess of 500,000 ring tones. "Flavor Of Life -ballad version-" had spent over a week at number two, as well as a week at number one on the real tone chart by this point.

On January 26, 2007, three more versions of the "Flavor Of Life -ballad version-" ring tone were released. These were the "2nd Chorus Version," "Bridge Version," and "Last Chorus Version." With the release of these new ring tones came the "Flavor Of Life -ballad version-"'s re-emergence at number one on the Chaku-Uta ring tone download chart.

"Flavor Of Life -ballad version-" was certified three times platinum for the month of January for sales of over 750,000, and peaked at number one on RIAJ's monthly ring tone download chart for January 2007.

By February 5, 2007, over a million ring tones had been downloaded, and it was forecasted that the number of downloads would in fact increase as the single's release date approached. This prediction was soon confirmed as within the span of two weeks as "Flavor of Life -Ballad Version-" was downloaded an additional 500,000 times, bringing its total downloads to 1.5 million.

On the eve of "Flavor Of Life"'s release as a physical single came the revelation that "Flavor Of Life -ballad version-" had sold over 2,000,000 ring tones before its release date, a first for any song or single in Japan and worldwide.

Full song downloads of "Flavor Of Life" on Chaku-Uta, iTunes Japan and other online dealers became available on February 28, 2007. "Flavor Of Life -ballad version-" debuted at number four on iTunes, but peaked at number 2 due to the original version's stay at number one.

On March 7, 2007, approximately one week after news of 2,000,000 downloads, it was confirmed that "Flavor Of Life" had sold over a million more downloads, totaling three million downloads.

On March 8, 2007, the "Flavor Of Life -ballad version-" fell to number two on Chaku-Uta's composite chart to the original version. It remained at number one on ring tones and number two for full song downloads. However, by March 11, the ballad version ringtone fell to number four on ringtones, while staying at number two on the composite charts. The descent of the Ballad Version continued throughout March, as new singles were released and rose past "Flavor of Life -ballad version-". Still, a month after release, "Flavor of Life -ballad version-" remained in the top ten for composite downloads on Chaku-Uta and iTunes.

In 2008, it was reported that "Flavor of Life" had become the #2 downloaded song of 2007, surpassing Rihanna's "Umbrella", but beaten by Avril Lavigne's "Girlfriend".

On May 13, 2008, according to Barks.jp, digital sales for "Flavor of Life" had reached 8 million copies, accounting for over half of the 15 million downloads for Utada's current album, "HEART STATION".

=== Original version's digital emergence ===
On February 19, 2007, the original version of "Flavor Of Life" was released as a ring tone as well. It debuted at number 45 on the Chaku-Uta download chart and rose to the top five within a week. As of February 27, 2007, the original version ring tone has peaked at number four.

Despite being overshadowed in ring tone sales, the original version outshined the ballad version in full song downloads, debuting at number three on iTunes Japan whereas the ballad version debuted at number four. The second day, it rose to number one, snatching the spot from the popular single by Namie Amuro, "Baby Don't Cry". "Flavor Of Life" also rose to number one on Chaku-Uta's full song download chart, and by March 8, 2007, it had finally reached number one on Chaku-Uta's composite chart, as well.

Although the Ballad Version fell out of the top five on both Chaku-Uta and iTunes a month after release, the full version has stayed at number one on iTunes and in the top five on Chaku-Uta full song downloads. The Original Version went on to stay at number one at iTunes Japan until April 20, 2007, when Spitz's Lookin' For took the position.

=== Airplay ===
"The "Flavor Of Life -ballad version-" aired on radio in Japan on January 15, 2007, the same day as the release of the PV. The song has since reached the top ten airplay rankings of various FM Japanese radio charts. On MUSIC LOUNGE radio in Japan "Flavor Of Life -ballad version-" reached the number one ranking.

On February 19, 2007, the original version of "Flavor Of Life" was aired on the radio. For the first week of airplay, "Flavor Of Life" faced lower airplay than Ayaka and Kobukuro's "WINDING ROAD", peaking at number 2 for composite FM airplay. However, "Flavor of Life" overtook WINDING ROAD on FM airplay the next week.

=== Physical sales ===
February 28, 2007 brought the release of the single, garnering buzz on Mixi for purchases. However, some bloggers reported the single was out of stock when they checked the store. Later it was confirmed that some sellers had already begun running out of the 400,000 initially shipped singles, just before "Flavor of Life" took number one on the Oricon dailies for February 27.

Despite tough competition from break out artists Ayaka and Kobukuro, Utada was confirmed to have taken the number one position on the Oricon with only the first day sales. Oricon reportedly stated that they had "checkmated" their competition.

On the second day of Flavor of Life's sales, the Oricon updated their daily charts to include indices for each day. Only a log of one week of these numbers was created, but for the known days, Utada has exceeded Arashi's "Love So Sweet" every day. Altogether, their index total for three days came to 87,898; the actual sales for these three days was much higher. Livedoor published an article using a factor of 1.81 to determine a suitable estimate for sales; if this was true, "Flavor Of Life" sold about 160,000 copies in just three days, outselling "Be My Last"'s total sales of 150,000, which made this single their best selling since "Dareka no Negai ga Kanau Koro" in only 72 hours. On the fourth day of sales, the index rebounded from 18,161 to 19,669. This single's sales rise continued for the rest of the week, once more peaking at a sales index of 23,821. The final estimate for the sales for the week was 278,930 copies sold; later on March 5, 2007, Oricon confirmed that final sales figures for the first week totaled 271,000. This figure is the highest first week sales for a single from a female artist since 2003's "&" by Ayumi Hamasaki.

On the second week of physical sales, Utada's daily index sum remained ahead of the competition for every day of the week. Despite falling to number three on the day of new releases, "Flavor Of Life" rebounded to number one on the next day and gained an increasing lead on its competition with each passing day. Utada's sales indices hovered around 10,000 each day, leading to scaled sales estimation of around 80,000 for the week by Thursday. Utada remained at number one for the rest of the week, selling a total of 140,000 for the week, and beating Yui's Cherry, Yui's best first week sales ever, for number one.

On the third week of physical sales, Utada's daily ranking was knocked down by Kumi Koda's But/Aishō and another single. Utada eventually gained the 2nd spot by the third day, and eventually reached number one, daily and weekly, outselling Koda's first week with their third week on the charts. This was the first time in four years and five months that a female artist had three consecutive weeks as number one- the last female single was Ayumi Hamasaki's Voyage. Flavor of Life became Utada's second single to have three consecutive weeks at the top of the Oricon Charts, with 光 (Hikari) being their first. On March 31, 2008, this single would also equal 2003's "Colors" as their longest charting single ever, with 45 weeks to date.

=== Promotional efforts ===
Utada originally alluded to this new single on December 20, 2006, through a blog entry's title. This release was accompanied with a website update that revealed a February release date for this new single as well as the release of the track list. The "Flavor Of Life -ballad version-"'s PV was released on January 15, 2007. The PV of the ballad version featured in-studio footage of Utada recording the song alongside a guitarist, a pianist, a cellist and various violinists.

On February 1, 2007, the television performance dates of "Flavor of Life" were released through Utada's official site. The first performance aired on CDTV on February 24, 2007, and the final performance aired on Utaban on March 8, 2007. Probably due to its tie-in with Hana Yori Dango 2, the Ballad Version was performed one time more than the Original (for a total of five). There was also another official update on February 1, 2007, that revealed other media Utada would be appearing in, including radio and magazines. Their promotional schedule for these efforts would last from early February to late March.

A PV blog web page was created for "Flavor of Life -ballad version-" on February 9, 2007. "Flavor of Life -ballad version-"'s PV peaked at the number one spot on the Oricon Chart web for most searched, played, and featured PV. Utada also was the most searched artist at the time. It also peaked at number one on Spaceshower TV, and for over a week, was the most downloaded PV on Chaku-Uta. The PV came in at #3 on Space Shower TV's Hot 100 Videos Year-End Rankings.

There was never a PV made besides the in studio footage accompanying "Flavor of Life -ballad version-."

== Covers ==
In 2014, Hanaregumi recorded the song for Utada Hikaru no Uta, a tribute album celebrating 15 years since Utada's debut.

== Track listing ==
CD single track listing
No.	Title	Length
1.	"Flavor of Life"	4:47
2.	"Flavor of Life" (ballad version)	5:25
3.	"Flavor of Life" (original karaoke)	4:49
4.	"Flavor of Life" (ballad version original karaoke)	5:25
5.	"Flavor of Life" (antidote mix)	5:19

"Flavor of Life" (antidote mix) is a CD-only bonus track.

== Charts ==
Chart performance for "Flavor of Life"
Chart (2007)	Peak position
Oricon weekly singles	1
Oricon yearly singles	2
RIAJ Reco-kyō ringtones Top 100: Ballad version	1
RIAJ Reco-kyō ringtones Top 100	1

== Certifications and sales ==
Certifications and sales for "Flavor of Life"
Region	Certification	Certified units/sales
Japan (RIAJ)	2× Platinum	650,510
Japan (RIAJ) Original version Ringtone	Million	1,000,000^{*}
Japan (RIAJ) Original version Full-length Ringtone	Million	1,000,000^{*}
Japan (RIAJ) Original version PC Download	Platinum	250,000^{*}
Japan (RIAJ) Ballad version Ringtone	2× Million	2,000,000^{*}
Japan (RIAJ) Ballad version Full-length Ringtone	3× Platinum	750,000^{*}
Japan (RIAJ) Ballad version PC Download	Gold	100,000^{*}
Streaming
Japan (RIAJ)	Platinum	100,000,000^{†}
^{*} Sales figures based on certification alone.^{†} Streaming-only figures based on certification alone.

== See also ==
- List of best-selling singles
