= List of number one Reco-kyō Chart singles 2006–09 =

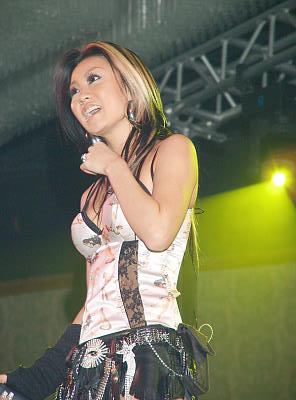
R&B singer Kumi Koda tied with Greeeen for the most #1 singles on the chart.

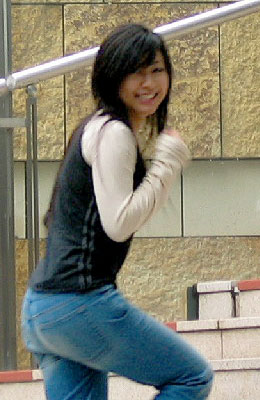
Singer-songwriter Hikaru Utada's song "Flavor of Life" was the first to reach #1 for three months.

The monthly highest-selling ringtones in Japan were ranked by the Recording Industry Association of Japan from August 2006 until February 2009, on the Reco-kyō Chart (レコ協チャート, Record Association Chart), also referred to by its formal name the Yūryō Ongaku Haishin Chart (有料音楽配信チャート, Paid Music Distribution Chart). The ringtone sales market was the highest certified digital market in Japan at the time. Charts were released on the 20th of the following month.

In April 2009, the chart was replaced with the RIAJ Digital Track Chart, a weekly chart tracking full-length cellphone downloads (着うたフル, Chaku-uta Full) as opposed to ringtones. This new chart retained the formal name for RIAJ's digital chart, Yūryō Ongaku Haishin Chart, but not Reco-kyō Chart (this solely referring to the monthly ringtone chart).

Greeeen was the most successful charting artist in this era, topping the charts for seven months. Both Greeeen and Kumi Koda had four #1 hits, the largest number of hits (Greeeen's "Ai Uta," "Ayumi," "Kiseki" and "Setsuna," and Koda's "Ai no Uta," "Unmei," "Won't Be Long" with Exile and "Yume no Uta"). Other successfully charting artists include Exile with three months ("I Believe," "Ti Amo" and "Won't Be Long" with Kumi Koda) and Kobukuro with two months ("Aoku Yasashiku" and "Tsubomi").

Three songs are tied for the most months charted: Thelma Aoyama featuring SoulJa's "Soba ni Iru ne," Greeeen's "Kiseki" and Hikaru Utada's "Flavor of Life." All three songs were extremely successful in the digital market: "Flavor of Life" was announced as the most successful single of all time in Japan totalling all formats (ringtone, cellphone full-length download, PC download, CD). In 2008, "Soba ni Iru ne," was announced to be the best-selling digital single of all time in Japan by Guinness World Records, an award given to Greeeen's "Kiseki" a year later.

Two songs charted for a total of two months on the chart, Greeeen's "Ai Uta," and "Sunao ni Naretara," a collaboration between R&B singer Juju with reggae/pop band Spontania, which was an answer song to their previous successful song "Kimi no Subete ni." Only one song that topped the monthly chart was a digital-only release with no physically released counterpart, Ayumi Hamasaki's "Together When...".

== Chart history ==
Year	Month	Song	Artist(s)	Ref(s)
2006	August	"Yumekui"	Ai Otsuka	
2006	September	"Taiyō no Uta"	Erika Sawajiri (as Kaoru Amane)	
2006	October	"Yume no Uta"	Kumi Koda	
2006	November	"Won't Be Long"	Exile & Kumi Koda	
2006	December	"Unmei"	Kumi Koda	
2007	January	"Flavor of Life (Ballad Version)"	Hikaru Utada	
2007	February	"Flavor of Life (Ballad Version)"	Hikaru Utada	
2007	March	"Flavor of Life (Original Version)"	Hikaru Utada	
2007	April	"Tsubomi"	Kobukuro	
2007	May	"Ashita Hareru Kana"	Keisuke Kuwata	
2007	June	"Ai Uta"	Greeeen	
2007	July	"Ai Uta"	Greeeen	
2007	August	"Lifetime Respect (Onna Hen)"	RSP	
2007	September	"Ai no Uta"	Kumi Koda	
2007	October	"Aoku Yasashiku"	Kobukuro	
2007	November	"I Believe"	Exile	
2007	December	"Together When..."	Ayumi Hamasaki	
2008	January	"Soba ni Iru ne"	Thelma Aoyama feat. SoulJa	
2008	February	"Soba ni Iru ne"	Thelma Aoyama feat. SoulJa	
2008	March	"Soba ni Iru ne"	Thelma Aoyama feat. SoulJa	
2008	April	"Kiseki"	Greeeen	
2008	May	"Kiseki"	Greeeen	
2008	June	"Kiseki"	Greeeen	
2008	July	"Gake no Ue no Ponyo"	Fujioka Fujimaki to Nozomi Ōhashi	
2008	August	"Kimi ni Utatta Love Song"	Lil'B	
2008	September	"Ti Amo"	Exile	
2008	October	"Sunao ni Naretara"	Juju feat. Spontania	
2008	November	"Orion"	Mika Nakashima	
2008	December	"Sunao ni Naretara"	Juju feat. Spontania	
2009	January	"Ayumi"	Greeeen	
2009	February	"Setsuna"	Greeeen	

== See also ==
- RIAJ
- RIAJ Digital Track Chart
- List of number-one digital singles of 2009 (Japan)
- List of number-one digital singles of 2010 (Japan)
- List of number-one digital singles of 2011 (Japan)
- List of number-one digital singles of 2012 (Japan)
