= Utada: In the Flesh 2010 =

2010 concert tour by Utada

Utada: In The Flesh 2010
- Tour by Utada
- Associated album: This Is the One
- Start date: January 15, 2010
- End date: February 12, 2010
- Legs: 2
- No. of shows: 8 in the United States; 2 in the United Kingdom

Hikaru Utada concert chronology
- Utada United 2006 (2006); Utada: In the Flesh 2010 (2010); Wild Life (2010)

Utada: In The Flesh 2010 was Japanese–American singer-songwriter Utada's first international tour. The 10-date sold out tour began in Honolulu and ended in London, with the London date reportedly selling out in as little as five hours, to which another date was added. The show received its name from the "Dirty Desire" lyric, "And you can't wait to see me / To see me in the flesh".

== Background and synopsis ==
In an interview before starting the tour, Utada stated that since demand had been so high, they would definitely go on tour (having previously speculated whether or not a tour was something they should have done). They also said they wanted the shows to be "stripped down", choosing small venues on purpose, and to give the show a more "warm" and "intimate" feel. In all of the venues, the stage was set with a banner depicting "Utada: In The Flesh 2010", with two screens either side of the stage, which would show the album artwork to the current song playing. The band that Utada performed with for the 2006 show, Utada United 2006 also played during In The Flesh (which is also their first tour since Utada United 2006).

DJ Mike Rizzo played numerous songs before the shows started, playing for around 1 hour before Utada begun.

Utada originally only planned to perform in London on February 12, but the 800 tickets sold out within five hours, and the ticket company accidentally sold almost twice as many, thus resulting in fans receiving email that their ticket was not valid. Following this, Utada decided to add a second date in London, the 11th. Those who received the email were made a priority for this date and given a ticket should they have wished to take it.

== Recordings and release ==
The NYC and London shows were filmed and were in discussion by Teruzane Utada for a possible iTunes or other digitally-available release immediately after the tour. Although the release ran into problems (namely the fact that half of the concert's track list was released under the Island Def Jam label, with the other half being released under EMI Japan [there was speculation that Def Jam would not allow the release due to Utada's contract with the label having ended]), Utada's official Twitter account mentioned that these problems were being resolved.

This then lead to a wait of three years, with little to no communication from Utada or their management about the release. Teruzane arose hopes again on January 31, 2011. Just after Utada's Wild Life tour, Teruzane resorted to Twitter to confirm that a video release for the In The Flesh tour was forthcoming, along with Wild Life. In addition, Teruzane mentioned his intent to have both shows released on video by Spring 2011.

However, Wild Life was released, with no comment from Teruzane about In The Flesh. It wasn't until two years later the topic was once again brought up, after a question by a Twitter user about the likelihood of a release, Teruzane apologised and stated that a release was "99% realistic".

On December 9, 2013, after almost three years since the show's first date, Utada: In the Flesh 2010 was released on iTunes Japan. On July 29, 2014, Utada: In the Flesh 2010 was released on the UK iTunes store, with the intention of releasing it to other markets soon after, namely the US, Mexico and Canada.

No.	Title	Length
1.	"Opening (Exodus opening track)"
2.	"On and On"
3.	"Merry Christmas Mr. Lawrence – FYI"
4.	"Poppin'"
5.	"This One (Crying Like a Child)"
6.	"Passion/Sanctuary" (Utada alternated from Japanese to English during the verses and chorus)
7.	"Sakura Drops" (played on the keyboard by Utada)
8.	"Stay Gold" (played on the keyboard by Utada)
9.	"Devil Inside"
10.	"Kremlin Dusk"
11.	"You Make Me Want to Be a Man"
12.	"The Bitter End" (Placebo cover)
13.	"Apple and Cinnamon"
14.	"Come Back to Me"
15.	"First Love"
16.	"Can You Keep a Secret?"
17.	"Automatic"
18.	"Dirty Desire"
19.	"Simple and Clean"
20.	"Me Muero"

- At the Honolulu and Boston shows, Utada performed an impromptu performance of Boku wa Kuma, as an audience request.

== Shows ==
Date	City	Country	Venue
North America
January 15, 2010	Honolulu	United States	Pipeline Cafe
January 19, 2010	Los Angeles	United States	House of Blues
January 21, 2010	Seattle	United States	The Showbox
January 24, 2010	San Francisco	United States	The Fillmore
January 30, 2010	Las Vegas	United States	House of Blues
February 2, 2010	Chicago	United States	House of Blues
February 5, 2010	Boston	United States	Paradise Rock Club
February 8, 2010	New York City	United States	Irving Plaza
Europe
February 11, 2010	London	United Kingdom	O2 Academy Islington
February 12, 2010	London	United Kingdom	O2 Academy Islington
