= Utada the Best =

Greatest hits album by Hikaru Utada
- Released: November 24, 2010
- Recorded: 2004–2009
- Genres: R&B; pop
- Length: 68:39
- Label: Universal Music Japan
- Compiler: Universal Music Japan

Hikaru Utada chronology
This Is the One (2009)	Utada the Best (2010)	Fantôme (2016)

Utada the Best is Japanese-American pop/R&B singer-songwriter Hikaru Utada's first English language compilation album, released on November 24, 2010, the same day as Utada Hikaru Single Collection Vol. 2. The album is a "best of" album featuring their more prominent and popular songs from their English career as Utada.

== Background ==
The album was announced via their Japanese Utada site (www.Utada.jp), without much in way of promoting or officially announcing it. It has also been included in various other sources. The album is available for sale in Japan only. Utada the Best features both songs from their 2004 album Exodus, and their 2009 album This Is the One, as well as previously released maxi-CD remixes by various artists. The album features both singles and non-singles from both albums.

The cover of Utada the Best is the same picture for that of their "Exodus '04" single cover.

Utada stated that the release of the compilation album is "entirely against [their] will". They also said "I understand that if it doesn't sell I'm the one who will take the hit, but to be honest, I don't want my fans putting down money for something that my heart isn't in." They posted on their official Twitter account: "The release of "Utada the Best" is entirely against my will. I wish that my fans won't have to buy it. There's no new material in it."

== Commercial performance ==
The album sold a total of 20,278 copies, peaking at No. 12 on Oricon charts. This is Utada's overall lowest selling album released in Japan, and is their only album (other than Precious) that did not reach No. 1 on any chart in Japan.

== Track listing ==
No.	Title	Producer(s)	Length
1.	"Come Back to Me" (from This Is the One)	Utada, M.S. Eriksen, T.E. Hermansen	3:58
2.	"Easy Breezy" (from Exodus)	Utada	4:03
3.	"Merry Christmas Mr. Lawrence – FYI" (from This Is the One)	Utada, M.S. Eriksen, T.E. Hermansen, Ryuichi Sakamoto	3:49
4.	"You Make Me Want to Be a Man" (from Exodus)	Utada	4:37
5.	"This One (Crying Like a Child)" (from This Is the One)	Utada, M.S. Eriksen, T.E. Hermansen	4:30
6.	"Exodus '04" (from Exodus)	Utada, Timbaland	4:32
7.	"Apple and Cinnamon" (from This Is the One)	Utada, M.S. Eriksen, T.E. Hermansen	4:39
8.	"Automatic Part II" (from This Is the One)	Utada, C. "Tricky" Stewart, S. Hall	3:01
9.	"Devil Inside" (from Exodus)	Utada	3:58
10.	"Kremlin Dusk" (from Exodus)	Utada	5:14
11.	"Sanctuary (Opening)" (from This Is the One [Bonus Track])	Utada	4:25
12.	"Sanctuary (Ending)" (from This Is the One [Bonus Track])	Utada	5:58
13.	"Exodus '04 (JJ Flores Double J Radio Mix)" (from Exodus '04 [Single])	Utada, JJ Flores	3:44
14.	"Devil Inside (RJD2 Remix)" (from Devil Inside [Single])	Utada, RJD2	4:07
15.	"Come Back to Me (Tony Moran & Warren Rigg Radio Edit)" (from Come Back to Me [Single])	Utada, M.S. Eriksen, T.E. Hermansen	4:33
16.	"Dirty Desire (Mike Rizzo Radio Edit)" (from Dirty Desire [Single])	Utada, Stewart	3:34

== Release history ==
Region	Date	Format
Japan	November 24, 2010	CD, digital download
Japan	November 26, 2010	Rental CD
