= Utada Hikaru Single Collection Vol. 2 =

Greatest hits album / EP by Hikaru Utada
- Released: November 24, 2010
- Recorded: 2004–2009 (Disc 1); 2009–2010 (Disc 2)
- Studios: Bunkamura Studio (Shibuya, Tokyo); Conway Recording Studios (Hollywood, California); Strongroom Studios (London, United Kingdom)
- Genres: J-pop; R&B; dance-pop; alternative; electronica
- Length: 85:46 (total): 61:39 (Single Collection Vol. 2) 24:07 (EP Hymne à L'amour)
- Languages: Japanese; some French
- Labels: Eastworld; EMI Music Japan
- Producers: Hikaru Utada, Akira Miyake, Teruzane Skingg Utada

Hikaru Utada chronology
This Is the One (2009)	Utada Hikaru Single Collection Vol. 2 (2010)	Fantôme (2016)

Singles from Single Collection Vol. 2
- 1. "Hymne à L'amour (Ai no Anthem)" Released: October 9, 2010 (download); 2. "Goodbye Happiness" Released: November 10, 2010 (download); 3. "Show Me Love (Not a Dream)" Released: November 17, 2010 (download)

Utada Hikaru Single Collection Vol. 2 is the second compilation album by Japanese-American recording artist Hikaru Utada. It was released on November 24, 2010, by EMI Music Japan, the same day as their Universal-released English language compilation album, Utada the Best. The album includes two discs, with the first being a 13-track greatest hits album spanning 2004–2009, while the second is an extended play (named Hymne à L'amour) featuring new material. Along with Utada the Best, this remained Utada's last album release for six years, until 2016's Fantôme, due to an announced hiatus. Several of the new songs achieved commercial success, with "Goodbye Happiness" reaching number one on Billboard's Japan Hot 100 chart, and "Can't Wait 'Til Christmas" reaching number one on the Recording Industry Association of Japan's digital track chart. Both songs have been certified by the association as gold records for full-length cellphone downloads.

According to Oricon, the album sold 334,000 copies by the end of 2010, being the 20th best-selling album of the year in Japan. The album also became the 56th best-selling album for 2011 in Japan, selling 108,000 copies since early 2011, summing up to a total of 443,000 units since its release date; however, Utada Hikaru Single Collection Vol. 2 still remains Utada's lowest-selling Japanese album to date. The album is certified Double Platinum by RIAJ for shipping half-a-million units to Japanese record stores.

== Background and development ==
In a blog entry dated August 9, 2010, Utada announced the greatest hits album, as well as a planned hiatus. Utada does not consider the hiatus a retirement from music, as they enjoy the process of making music, and considers themselves a musician. Furthermore, Utada still has a contract to fulfill with EMI Group, a contract signed in 2010 to release music globally under the name Hikaru Utada. Utada explained in an interview on Tokio Hot 100 that the hiatus was to ground them, as since they were 15 they had not grown up, and had no concept of 'true personal growth'. During their hiatus, they intend to do overseas volunteer work, learn French, and re-establish relationships with their relatives, such as with their father and manager Teruzane Utada, who they admitted not meeting outside of work.

The first disc is a collection of Utada's physical and digital singles released from their albums Ultra Blue (2006) and Heart Station (2008) in a reverse chronological order. This includes the 2009 Russell McNamara remix of "Beautiful World" for the film Evangelion: 2.0 You Can (Not) Advance, "Beautiful World (Planitb Acoustica Mix)", however the collection does not include "Fight the Blues", the lead digital single from Heart Station, or their 2008 digital single "Eternally (Drama Mix)" a re-arrangement of a song from their 2001 album Distance for use in the drama Innocent Love.

The second disc of the album (Hymne à L'amour) features five previously unpublished songs. The songs, except for "Can't Wait 'Til Christmas", are all composed in a single coherent manner, with Utada writing about reconciling with their past self and true self. Utada believes that this manner of writing was similar to their writing style for their debut Japanese album, First Love. Utada tweeted on September 28 that they were still in the process of writing the lyrics to the final song. Utada wrote "Arashi no Megami" as a thank you song for their mother, Keiko Fuji. "Show Me Love (Not a Dream)" was inspired by the feelings Utada felt while making their decision to go on hiatus. "Goodbye Happiness" was written while attempting to write a love song.

== Promotion and release ==
Utada Hikaru Single Collection Vol. 2 was released two years and nine months after their previous original Japanese album Heart Station in 2008, and a year and nine months after their second and last Island Records effort This Is the One in 2009.

The first single from the album was "Hymne à l'amour (Ai no Anthem)", a cover of the 1950s song by French chanson singer Édith Piaf. Utada sings the original French lyrics, as well as a personally written Japanese translation. It was used in commercials for Pepsi Nex in Japan, as a part of a campaign featuring famous Japanese musicians covering songs (such as Kumi Koda, Perfume and L'Arc-en-Ciel). The commercial began airing on October 2, with a digital release date of October 9.

The lead single from the album was "Goodbye Happiness", released digitally to cellphones on November 10. The song received heavy airplay before the album's release, further peaking at #1 on Billboard's Japan Hot 100 chart on airplay alone. The song also received a music video, directed by Utada personally. This video was packaged on a bonus DVD that came with pre-orders of the album. The song was used in commercials for Recochoku.

"Show Me Love (Not a Dream)" was released as a digital download a week before the album's release. It will be used as the theme song for the Tomohisa Yamashita starring film adaptation of the manga Tomorrow's Joe, to be released on February 11, 2011. Much like "Goodbye Happiness", the song was used in commercials for Recochoku.

The two remaining new songs were also used in commercial campaigns. The song "Arashi no Megami" was used in confectionists Morinaga & Company's 1 Choco for 1 Smile (1チョコ for 1スマイル) commercial campaign, which is part of the wider Ichiokunin no Valentine Project (一億人のバレンタインプロジェクト; "100 Million People Valentine Project") to combat child poverty. From November 24 until February 14, one yen from every digital download of the song will be donated to the cause. "Can't Wait 'Til Christmas" was used for the second round of Pepsi Nex commercials featuring Utada, after "Hymne à l'amour (Ai no Anthem)".

In promotion for the album, Utada set up a Twitter account, Utadahikaru, on September 28. An official Hikaru Utada YouTube account was also set up in early November, featuring the music video for "Goodbye Happiness". The channel was briefly taken down due to a false copyright infringement claim by a company called Media Interactive Inc., which was reported in the media. Utada personally tweeted about the incident.

Utada featured in an extensive number of magazines during album promotions, including CD&DL Data, Edge Style, Gekkan Songs, Gekkan the Television, Happie Nuts, Mini, Musica, Non-no, Ori Star, Patipati, Pia, PopSister, Rockin' On Japan, Smart, Tokyo Calendar, Tokyo Walker, What's In? and You Music. Utada also promoted the album by appearing on radio shows through late November and early December, including appearances on Artist Special, Au On Air Music Chart, Bang! Bang! Zip!, J-pop Magazine, Love & Green, Music Coaster, On8, Paradise Beat, Stadium Rock! and Tokio Hot 100. The entire album was broadcast on November 17 on Tokyo FM, followed by 9 other radio stations also airing the album later. The album also received releases in other Asian countries, with South Korea releasing the album on December 3, Taiwan on the 10th and Thailand on the 23rd.

Utada performed a short tour for the album, a concert series titled Wild Life. The tour features only two dates, both held at the Yokohama Arena on December 8 and 9. The December 8 concert was broadcast on a live feed to 70 screens in 64 cinemas across Japan. Tickets were released for the events on November 21, and sold out on the same day. The December 8 concert was broadcast on Ustream.tv, a live video streaming website. Between the two channels set up for the concert, they were accessed a total of 925,000 times, with 345,000 unique viewers, as well as 185,000 comments left on the feed. This was a global record on Ustream.tv, for the highest number of simultaneous accesses of any video, with the previous highest being only 100,000. The December 8 concert will be broadcast on January 22, 2011, on music video channel Space Shower. A different cut of the concert will later be shown in February, dubbed the "Space Shower TV Original Edition". The original cut was created in collaboration with Sky PerfecTV.

On January 15, 2011, a documentary named Utada Hikaru: Ima no Watashi (宇多田ヒカル ～今のわたし～, "Hikaru Utada: What I'm Like Right Now") was aired on Japan's public broadcast channel NHK. The documentary followed Utada through their activities before their hiatus, including recording backing vocals for "Goodbye Happiness" in London in August 2010, filming the music video for "Goodbye Happiness", preparing for their Wild Life concerts and footage from the concerts. Interspersed through this was scenes of Utada being interviewed by Chris Peppler, a navigator for J-Wave's radio program Tokio Hot 100. Two songs were performed live in a studio, "Show Me Love (Not a Dream)" and "Goodbye Happiness", and clips of "First Love", "Nijiiro Bus" and "Prisoner of Love" from the concerts were broadcast.

== Critical reception ==
Professional ratings
Review scores
Source	Rating
Barfout!	(favorable)
Hot Express	(favorable)
Listen Japan	(favorable)
Rockin' On Japan	(favorable)
Rolling Stone Japan	5/5 stars
Vibe	(favorable)
What's In?	(favorable)

The album was received positively by music critics. Tetsuo Hiraga from Hot Express noted that there was much more sorrow and pain in their songs in the collection, as opposed to the songs collected in Utada Hikaru Single Collection Vol. 1, believing the album "gives birth to an unconscious sympathy". Vibe's Mio Yamada believed that Vol. 2 was like "self-cutting sharpness hidden in shadows", and described the collection as "an emotional and sentimental autobiography". She believed love dealt with in Vol. 2 was much more mature than on Vol. 1, and noted "Passion" and "Dareka no Negai ga Kanau Koro" on their lyrics that expressed weakness and strength simultaneously. Yamada, Jiro Yamazaki of Barfout! and Mikio Yanagisawa of What's In? all felt the songs on the album had the ability to relate to everybody. Yanagisawa described the work as "blue introspection", and the album as a "jem that feels like a miracle". Yamada similarly likened all of the singles as "jewels".

Akira Kondō from Listen Japan felt the collection expressed an extremely personal world outlook, and believed the collection was an excellent way to experience the change in Utada's sound between Ultra Blue and Heart Station. Similarly, Hiroki Yokuyama of Rockin' On Japan remarked that the album was a rare pathway showing Utada's expression.

Many critics commented that all of the new songs were of high quality. Kondō described them as "perfect", and that they "rise and flood with a powerful energy". Yanagisawa singled out "Show Me Love (Not a Dream)" as the best of the new tracks. Hiraga felt her performance in the music video for "Goodbye Happiness" was thrilling, also called the song a "lovely masterpiece" that was "like a fight towards loneliness". Yokuyama had an appreciation of "Can't Wait 'Til Christmas", feeling that it was much more universal and original than most Christmas songs.

== Commercial performance ==
The album debuted at number one on Japan's Oricon daily albums chart, with 22,000 copies sold. It later debuted at number one on Oricon's weekly charts with 231,000 copies sold, their seventh successive Japanese language number one album. It outsold albums by Kara, Masaharu Fukuyama and Ikimonogakari that week but the figure was less than half of that of the first week of their 2008 studio album, Heart Station, which had sold 480,000 copies. The album has been certified double platinum by the Recording Industry Association of Japan for more than 500,000 physical copies shipped to music stores. According to Oricon's sales data, the album was the 20th most sold album in Japanese CD stores in 2010. However, with 441,000 copies sold, it is currently Utada's lowest selling Japanese album. However, including their entire discography, it is their third worst selling album, after Universal English-language albums This Is the One (2009) and Utada the Best (2010). In South Korea, the album debuted at the #1 spot in the Gaon International Albums Chart in the week of December 5–11, 2010, but the album only charted for a week. In Taiwan, the album debuted at the sixth spot on the G-Music Combo album charts, having 1.54% of total album sales in the week of December 10–16, 2010 but it quickly dropped to the #19 spot, contributing to 0.81% of the total album sales for the week of December 17–23, 2010, charting for only two weeks, selling almost 8,000 copies in total, but behind other Asian acts which sold above the 8,000-mark in the said chart like Ayumi Hamasaki, Namie Amuro, Wonder Girls and Super Junior.

During the album's release, the leading track "Goodbye Happiness" reached number one on Billboard's Japan Hot 100 chart, after charting for four weeks. "Can't Wait 'Til Christmas" charted at number 85 in this week, due to paid downloads on provider iTunes. On the Recording Industry Association of Japan's digital track chart for full-length cellphone downloads, "Show Me Love (Not a Dream)" charted at number 21 a week before the album's release. During the week of release, "Can't Wait 'Til Christmas" reached number 59, "Arashi no Megami" number 62 and "Prisoner of Love" number 90.

Since the release of the album, "Can't Wait 'Til Christmas" has reached number one on the Recording Industry Association of Japan's digital track chart, and number 2 on the Japan Hot 100.

== Track listing ==
All songs written and composed by Hikaru Utada, except "Hymne à L'amour ~Ai no Ansemu~" lyrics by Édith Piaf and music by Marguerite Monnot, with Japanese translation by Utada.

Disc 1: Single Collection Vol. 2
No.	Title	Arranger(s)	Length
1.	"Prisoner of Love" (from Heart Station)	Utada	4:46
2.	"Stay Gold" (from Heart Station)	Utada	5:14
3.	"Heart Station" (from Heart Station)	Utada	4:36
4.	"Kiss & Cry" (from Heart Station)	Utada	5:06
5.	"Beautiful World" (from Heart Station)	Utada	5:17
6.	"Flavor of Life (Ballad Version)" (from Heart Station)	Utada, Alexis Smith, Yuzuru Tomita	5:25
7.	"Boku wa Kuma" (from Heart Station)	Tomita, Utada	2:23
8.	"This Is Love" (from Ultra Blue)	Utada	4:57
9.	"Keep Tryin'" (from Ultra Blue)	Utada	4:53
10.	"Passion" (from Ultra Blue)	Utada	4:43
11.	"Be My Last" (from Ultra Blue)	Utada	4:30
12.	"Dareka no Negai ga Kanau Koro" (from Ultra Blue)	Utada	4:26
13.	"Beautiful World (Planitb Acoustica Mix)"	Russell McNamara	5:10
Total length:			57:26

Disc 2: Special Collection − Hymne à L'amour (EP)
No.	Title	Arranger(s)	Length
1.	"Arashi no Megami" (嵐の女神, "Storm Goddess")	Utada	4:16
2.	"Show Me Love (Not a Dream)"	Utada, Matt Rohde	4:17
3.	"Goodbye Happiness"	Utada	5:21
4.	"Hymne à L'amour (Ai no Ansemu)" (HYMNE À L'AMOUR ～愛のアンセム～, French and Japanese for "Anthem of Love")	Naruyoshi Kikuchi, Utada	6:33
5.	"Can't Wait 'Til Christmas"	Utada	3:44
Total length:			24:11

== Personnel ==
Personnel details were sourced from Utada Hikaru Single Collection Vol. 2's liner notes booklet.

Managerial

- Miyake Akira – producer
- Yuuko Honda – musician coordination
- San-e Ichii – executive producer
- Michael T. Martin – overseas production contractor
- Fumio Miyata – musician coordination
- Hidenobu Okita – director
- Hikaru Utada – producer
- Teruzane "Skigg" Utada – producer
- Norio Yamamoto – Los Angeles session coordination

Performance credits

- David Carpenter – bass (#1-9)
- Chris Chaney – bass (#2-2)
- Yamaya Honda – drums (#2-4)
- Takashi Itani – percussions (#2-4)
- Noriyasu Kawamura – drums (#2-1)
- Kinbara Chieko Strings – String section (#1-6)
- Tsuyoshi Kon – acoustic guitar (#1-6, #1-11—1-12, #2-1)
- Makiyama Junko Strings – String section (#1-1)
- Ben Mauro – guitar (#1-10)
- Russel McNamara – guitars (#1-13)
- Gary Novak – drums (#2-2)
- Akemi Ohta – flute (#2-4)
- Hiroshi Okamoto – acoustic piano (#1-6, #2-1, #205)
- Dan Reynolds – drums (#1-13)
- Forrest Robinson – drums (#1-10—1-11)
- Matt Rohde – acoustic piano (#1-10, #2-2), keyboards (#1-9—1-10, #2-2)
- Alexis Smith – electric bass (#1-6), keyboards (#1-6)
- Masato Suzuki – bass (#2-4)
- Synergy Vocals – chorus vocals (#2-3)
- Takeshi Taneda – bass (#2-1)
- Yuzuru Tomita – acoustic piano (#1-2), keyboards (#1-7)
- Masayasu Tzboguchi – electric piano (#2-4)
- Hikaru Utada – acoustic piano (#1-2, #1-12), keyboards (#1-1—1-5, #1-9—1-12, #2-2—2-3, #2-5), vocals
- Phil Xenidis – guitar (#2-2)

Visuals and imagery

- Asuka Katagiri – photo
- Manabu Mizuno – art direction
- Masaru Uemura – design
- Kazuhisa Yoshimoto – retouching

Technical and production

- Matsui Atsushi – mixing (#1-7), recording
- Daniel Burns – recording (#1-9, #2-2)
- Glenn Erwin – Pro Tools operation (#1-10)
- Goetz B. – mixing (#1-1—1-11, #2-1-2-2, #2-4—2-5), recording (#2-3)
- Goh Hotoda – mixing (#1-12), recording (#1-12)
- Ted Jensen – mastering
- Naruyoshi Kikuchi – arrangement (#2-4)
- Masahito Komori – recording (#2-3)
- Damien Lewis – additional/assistant engineering (#2-3)
- Russel McNamara – production, programming (#1-13)
- Matt Rohde – arrangement (#2-2), programming (#1-9—1-10, #2-2)
- Alexis Smith – additional programming (#1-5, #1-8—1-10, #2-3, #2-5), arrangement (#1-6), programming (#1-6)
- Masaki Takamura – recording (#2-4)
- Brian Taliaferro – additional programming (#1-11)
- Phil Tan – mixing (#2-3)
- Yuzuru Tomita – additional programming (#1-1—1-5, #1-8, #2-3), arrangement (#1-6—1-7), programming (#1-7), string arrangement (#1-1, #1-6)
- Kazuhide Tsunemi – additional programming (#1-1)
- Hikaru Utada – additional programming (#1-7), arrangement, programming (#1-1—1-5, #1-12, #2-2, #2-5), string arrangement (#1-1, #1-6)
- Pat Woodward – recording (#1-10)
- Takuo Yamamoto – string arrangement (#1-6)

== Charts ==
Chart (2010)	Peak position
Oricon daily albums	1
Oricon weekly albums	1
Oricon monthly albums	3
Oricon yearly albums	20
Gaon Albums Chart (South Korea)	12
Gaon International Albums Chart (South Korea)	1
G-Music Combo albums chart (Taiwan)	6
G-Music Combo International albums chart (Taiwan)	2

== Sales and certifications ==
Chart	Amount
Oricon physical sales	444,100
RIAJ physical shipping certification	2× Platinum (500,000+)
G Music physical sales (Taiwan)	8,000

== Release history ==
Region	Date	Format	Distributing label
Japan	November 24, 2010	CD, digital download	EMI Music Japan
France	December 1, 2010	Digital download	EMI
Germany	December 1, 2010	Digital download	EMI
United Kingdom	December 1, 2010	Digital download	EMI
South Korea	December 3, 2010	CD	Warner Music Korea
Taiwan	December 10, 2010	CD	Gold Typhoon
Japan	December 11, 2010	Rental CD	EMI Music Japan
Philippines	December 17, 2010	CD	PolyEast
Thailand	December 23, 2010	CD	Warner Music Thailand
United States	January 4, 2011	CD	EMI
Canada	February 1, 2011	CD	EMI Music Canada
