= Show Me Love (Not a Dream) =

- Digital download cover artwork

Promotional single by Hikaru Utada

from the album Utada Hikaru Single Collection Vol. 2
- Released: November 17, 2010
- Recorded: 2010
- Genre: Rock, dark ambient
- Length: 4:17
- Label: EMI Music Japan
- Songwriter: Hikaru Utada
- Producer: Hikaru Utada

Audio sample
- Show Me Love (Not a Dream): file; help

"Show Me Love (Not a Dream)" is a song by Japanese-American singer-songwriter Hikaru Utada. Used as the theme song for the film Tomorrow's Joe (2011), it was released as a digital download preceding Utada's second Japanese compilation album, Utada Hikaru Single Collection Vol. 2, on November 17, 2010.

== Composition and inspiration ==
The song is a multi-sectioned composition, featuring piano, synths and later a rock arrangement featuring drums and bass. The song begins with a piano solo, which leads into a section featuring Utada's vocals and atmospheric background synths. Background vocals and a bass line are later added in this section. For the first chorus, these instruments cut out, and the arrangement is replaced with a rock sound. The rock sound persists until the end of the song, with occasional verse sections featuring background vocals, atmospheric sounds and piano.

The lyrics of the song are self-reflective, with the protagonist of the song making statements about their own flaws, such letting their lack of confidence get the best of them, endless anxiety, and weakness, however says that these are not things they are embarrassed about. Several images in the verses are created, such as slowly sinking to the bottom of a lake, chasing two rabbits but catching only one, and a purple traffic light stopping their thoughts. The song later tells people to scream, find the source of pain and to forget theories; and that it "is good if we all carry deep darkness." The song finishes with several aphoristic statements, such as "If you climb a mountain, you must go down," "no matter what kind of deep love you have, it is imperfect." The song ends with a plea to recognise yourself and your own courage.

"Show Me Love (Not a Dream)" was inspired by the feelings Utada felt while making their decision to go on hiatus.

== Promotion ==
The song was used in an advertising commercial campaign for Recochoku digital media store during the album's release, much like "Goodbye Happiness" before it. Later in February 2011, the song was used as the theme song for the film adaptation of the manga Tomorrow's Joe, starring Tomohisa Yamashita.

The song was performed during Utada's two date concert series Wild Life in December 2010.

== Chart rankings ==
Chart (2010)	Peak position
RIAJ Digital Track Chart Top 100	21
Chart (2011)	Peak position
Billboard Japan Adult Contemporary Airplay	20
Billboard Japan Hot 100	27
RIAJ Digital Track Chart Top 100	33

== Release history ==
Region	Date	Format
Japan	November 17, 2010	Full-length cellphone download, ringtone
Japan	November 24, 2010	PC download
