= Michael Rizzo =

Mike Rizzo
- Also known as: Funk Generation
- Origin: New York City, United States
- Genres: Electronic, pop, house
- Occupations: Disc jockey, producer, remixer
- Instruments: Turntables, sampler
- Website: www.djmikerizzo.com

Michael Rizzo is an American DJ, record producer, and remixer from New York City, active since the early 1990s. He is well known for working with various artists such as Jennifer Green and Sun, all of whom scored hits on both Billboard's Hot Dance Club Play and Hot Dance Airplay charts.

He also achieved success on both charts in 2005 with the song "Can't Go On", which featured female singer Allie (Credited as "Mike Rizzo Presents Allie"). The music video for his song, "I Wanna Hold You", which he produced and co-wrote and featured recording artist Adam Barta.

From January to February 2010, Rizzo headlined pop singer-songwriter Utada's tour, Utada: In The Flesh 2010.

In December 2010, he was nominated for "Best Remixed Recording, Non-classical" at the 53rd Annual Grammy Awards, for the single "Orpheus (Quiet Carnival)" by Latin-jazz artist Sergio Mendes.

== Mixed compilations ==
- 2002: NYC Dance Party
- 2003: Webster Hall's New York Dance, Vol. 6
- 2004: Trance Nation: America, Vol. 3
- 2005: ThriveMix 01

== Selected remixes ==
- Adam Lambert – Never Close Our Eyes
- Akon featuring Colby O'Donis & Kardinal Offishall – Beautiful
- Akon – Right Now (Na Na Na)
- Alicia Madison-Superstar
- Alyssa Rubino – Keep On Dancing
- Anjulie – Boom
- An-Ya – Candy Shop
- An-Ya – Nightlife
- Audio Playground – (A Little) Respect
- Audio Playground – Shadows
- Audio Playground – Emergency (Feat. Snoop Dogg)
- Big Time Rush featuring New Boyz – Boyfriend
- Boys Like Girls and Taylor Swift – Two is Better than One
- Brandy – Full Moon
- Brian Anthony featuring Ya Boy – Electricity
- Britney Spears – 3
- Britney Spears – Break the Ice
- Britney Spears – If U Seek Amy
- Britney Spears – Womanizer
- Britney Spears – Hold It Against Me
- Cheryl Cole – The Flood
- Chris Brown featuring Benny Benassi – Beautiful People
- Cobra Starship featuring Leighton Meester – Good Girls Go Bad
- Danielle Bollinger – Kiss the Sky
- Danity Kane – Damaged
- David Archuleta – Crush
- Deborah Cox – Play Your Part
- Denine – What Happened To Love
- Erika Jayne – Roller Coaster
- Erika Jayne – Give You Everything
- Freemasons featuring Katherine Ellis – When You Touch Me
- J. Costa – Telling You Now
- Jada – American Cowboy
- Jason Derulo – In My Head
- Jason Mraz – I'm Yours
- Jewel – Serve the Ego
- Joe Zangie – You Remind Me
- Jordin Sparks – Battlefield
- Jordin Sparks – One Step at a Time
- Justin Timberlake featuring Beyoncé – Until the end of Time
- Kaci Battaglia featuring Ludacris – Body Shots
- Kamaliya – Arrhythmia
- Katharine McPhee – Over It
- Kelly Osbourne – One Word
- Keri Hilson – Return the Favor
- Kristinia DeBarge – Goodbye
- Kwanza Jones – Think Again
- Kylie Minogue – Can't Get You Out of My Head
- L2 – Boys & Girls
- L2 – Criminal in Bed
- Leah Renee – IBF (Imaginary Boyfriend)
- Lindsay Lohan – Bossy
- Lionel Richie – Just Go
- Livvi Franc – Automatik
- Livvi Franc – Now I'm That Bitch
- Lolene – Sexy People
- Luther Vandross – I'd Rather
- Madonna – Living for Love
- Marcie – Midnight
- Marina – Searching For You
- Marina Chello – Sideline
- Mask Munkeys – This Night
- Mayra Verónica-Freak Like Me
- Mayra Verónica-If You Wanna Fly
- Miranda Cosgrove – Dancing Crazy
- Miranda Cosgrove – Kissin' U
- Natasha Bedingfield – Touch (Natasha Bedingfield song)|Touch
- Nick Lachey – Patience
- Nikki Webster – Devilicious
- Raquela – Tell It to My Heart
- Ron Perkov – Miss You
- Sa-Fire – Exotique
- Sarah Atereth – Out of My Mind
- Santana, Wyclef ft. Avicii – Dar Um Jeito (We Will Find A Way)World Cup 2014 Song
- Sergio Mendes – Orpheus (Quiet Carnival)
- Shontelle – T-Shirt
- Tamia - Stranger In My House
- Usher – Moving Mountains
- Utada – Come Back to Me
- Utada – Dirty Desire
- Wendy - Turn It Up
- Willa Ford – I Wanna Be Bad
- Zayra – V.I.P.
- (We Are) Nexus – World Around Me
