= Wild Life (concert) =

2010 concert tour by Hikaru Utada

- Concert by Hikaru Utada
- Blu-Ray cover
- Associated album: Utada Hikaru Single Collection Vol. 2
- Start date: December 8, 2010
- End date: December 9, 2010
- Legs: 1
- No. of shows: 2 in Japan

Hikaru Utada concert chronology
- Utada: In the Flesh 2010 (2010); Wild Life (2010); Laughter in the Dark (2018)

Wild Life was Japanese-American singer-songwriter Hikaru Utada's final concert tour before their scheduled hiatus from 2011. Utada performed only two dates at the Yokohama Arena, Japan on December 8 and 9, 2010.

== Tickets ==
Tickets were initially going to be distributed through purchases of the limited first-press issues of the album supporting the tour, Utada Hikaru Single Collection Vol. 2, with people being told to visit a website to enter the draw, but this idea was later scrapped. Instead, the codes received in the album are now for a website in which people can view the show on demand, watch a special movie (which later turned out to be a "Making of" featurette about the making of the Goodbye Happiness music video), view pictures from the concerts, as well as sign up for a special gift of the week. The site went live on January 13, 2011.

== Concert ==
Tickets to the show were sold in a "lottery"-style fashion, similar to that of previous Hikaru Utada concerts (not counting Utada: In the Flesh 2010) with each ticket costing ¥6,000. The concert took place at Yokohama Arena, featuring a round stage, with instrument players behind a perspex glass wall. Utada dropped from the top of the stage on a platform after the opening was shown. The stage was set out in a 360-degree fashion, with the audience sat all around Utada.

=== Footage ===
The December 8 show of Wild Life was filmed and broadcast to 64 cinemas in Japan, and streamed free on the live streaming website Ustream.tv, with two channels set up. There was a total access of 925,000, with 345,000 of those being unique viewers, as well as around 185,000 comments left in the chat feed. This was a global record for Ustream, for the highest number of simultaneous access of any video they've previously shown on the site, with the previous record being only 100,000.

== DVD release ==
On February 3, 2011, Teruzane Utada posted on Twitter that he was going to "the first meeting" regarding the DVD release of the Wild Life concerts. He then stated in a later Tweet that he was planning on releasing Wild Life and Utada: In The Flesh 2010 as a DVD bundle set. Wild Life was planned for release on both DVD and Blu-ray formats on April 6, 2011. The DVD version features two discs, the first containing the show itself, and the second featuring a photo gallery with pictures taken by Kenji Miura, some never before seen audience interactions during the shows, as well as a behind-the-scenes look at the making of the concert (from rehearsals to after the final show). The Blu-ray version has both the concert and special features on one disc. On March 24, 2011, Utada Tweeted that both the DVD and Blu-ray release of Wild Life have been postponed, due to the earthquake and resulting tsunami in Japan, damaging the pressing factories. The DVD version was released on April 20, 2011, with the Blu-ray release under a month later on 18 May.

In Taiwan, the DVD format of Wild Life was planned for release locally by Gold Typhoon, an entertainment company launched with the support of EMI, on May 3, 2011. The Taiwanese DVD version will include two discs, featuring the same features as the Japanese version, in addition with "hidden style" Traditional Chinese subtitles provided. The Blu-ray version is imported from Japan by the label. On May 19, 2011, a day before the DVD releases, Gold Typhoon announced on its blog site that "the Taiwanese version of Wild Life will be postponed, due to the copyright issue of the songs in concerts." On May 30, 2011, Gold Typhoon confirmed the Taiwanese DVD version of Wild Life with a revised release date of June 3, 2011, on both the Special Blog Sites and Official Website. On June 2, 2011, Utada's staff tweeted both locally release dates of the DVD in Taiwan and Hong Kong: "Utada Hikaru's new live DVD "Wild Life" will be released in Taiwan (June 3rd) and HK (June 10th) locally."

== Set list ==
1. "Intro (Kuma Spaceship Video)"
2. "Goodbye Happiness"
3. "Traveling"
4. "Take 5"
5. "Prisoner of Love"
6. "Colors"
7. "Letters"
8. "Hymne à l'amour (Ai no Anthem)" (A "stripped down" performance, with only a piano accompanying Utada's vocals)
9. "Sakura Drops" (Performed on the piano by Utada)
10. "Eclipse (Interlude)" (Synthesizer solo performances from band members while Utada goes through a costume change)
11. "Passion" (Used the Kingdom Hearts II bridge)
12. "Blue"
13. "Show Me Love (Not a Dream)"
14. "Stay Gold" (Performed on the piano by Utada)
15. "Boku wa Kuma"
16. "Automatic"
17. "First Love" (Performed on the piano by Utada)
18. "Flavor of Life (Ballad Version)"
19. "Beautiful World"
20. "Hikari"
21. "Nijiiro Bus"

Encore

1. "Across the Universe" (The Beatles cover, also featured Utada playing the guitar)
2. "Can't Wait 'Til Christmas"
3. "Time Will Tell"

== Show dates ==
Date	City	Country	Venue	Attendance
December 8, 2010	Yokohama	Japan	Yokohama Arena	34,000
December 9, 2010	Yokohama	Japan	Yokohama Arena	34,000
