= Can't Wait 'Til Christmas =

Song by Hikaru Utada

from the album Utada Hikaru Single Collection Vol. 2
- Language: Japanese
- Released: November 24, 2010
- Genre: Pop, Christmas
- Length: 3:44
- Label: EMI Music Japan
- Songwriter: Hikaru Utada
- Producer: Hikaru Utada

"Can't Wait 'Til Christmas" is a song by Japanese-American singer-songwriter Hikaru Utada. It was released on Utada's second Japanese compilation album, Utada Hikaru Single Collection Vol. 2, on November 24, 2010.

== Composition and inspiration ==
The song was written by Hikaru Utada, and is the first Christmas song they have written. The song is a piano backed slow-paced ballad, sung in a higher register to the majority of Utada's songs. Other than piano, subtle background sounds are occasionally added into the instrument backing, such as occasional cymbal sounds. The lyrics describe a person in winter on Christmas Eve, who cannot wait for Christmas Day, however, they ask why people want to chase after tomorrow instead of cherishing what they have now. The protagonist of the song has days filled with nothing to do at Christmas time, and feels that they want to be close to their lover. They chide their lover for trying to act cool in front of them, but feels the distance between them growing less. They want their lover to not promise them things for the future, and instead to listen to what they feel right in that moment.

The song was written for fans who expressed an interest in a Hikaru Utada-written Christmas song. Utada felt the shiest about this song being released out of the new songs written for Utada Hikaru Single Collection Vol. 2, as they had been trying to write a Christmas song for 1–2 years, but could not find the proper inspiration. Utada believed that the writing style used in "Can't Wait 'Til Christmas" is different from that of the rest of the new songs.

== Promotion ==
Hikaru Utada in the commercial for Pepsi Nex

The song was used in an advertising commercial campaign for Pepsi Nex, their second successive Pepsi Nex commercial, after "Hymne à l'amour (Ai no Anthem)" in October. This is the first time Pepsi has used an original song in its recent advertisement campaign in Japan, as all of the other songs have been covers of Western songs. The commercials began airing from December 4 onwards. The commercials feature Utada singing the song in an outdoor wintery landscape, lying against an oversized Pepsi Nex bottle.

The song was performed during Utada's two date concert series Wild Life in December 2010.

== Charts ==
"Can't Wait 'Til Christmas"
A sample from "Can't Wait 'Til Christmas"

Chart performance for "Can't Wait 'Til Christmas"
Chart	Peak position
Japan (Japan Hot 100)	2
Japan Adult Contemporary (Billboard)	3
Japan Digital Track (RIAJ)	1

== Certifications ==
Certifications for "Can't Wait 'Til Christmas"
Chart	Amount
RIAJ full-length cellphone downloads	Gold (100,000)
RIAJ PC downloads	Gold (100,000)
