= Be My Last =

Single by Hikaru Utada

from the album Ultra Blue
- Released: September 28, 2005
- Genre: J-pop, pop rock
- Length: 4:30
- Label: Toshiba-EMI
- Songwriter(s): Hikaru Utada
- Producer(s): Akira Miyake, Hikaru Utada and Teruzane Utada

Hikaru Utada singles chronology
"Exodus '04" (2005)	"Be My Last" (2005)	"You Make Me Want to Be a Man" (2005)

Music video
- "Be My Last" on YouTube

"Be My Last" is Hikaru Utada's 14th Japanese single, released on September 28, 2005. It was used for the 2005 film Spring Snow, an adaptation of the 1966 Yukio Mishima novel of the same name.

The cover art was taken in Prague, Czech Republic. The large, dark building shown to the left is Prague Castle.

== Promotion ==
Utada had five TV performances a month after it had been released, due to their promotional work in Europe for the last Exodus album single, "You Make Me Want to Be a Man", which delayed their performances. The timing of these lives has also fit in with the release of Spring Snow. Also planned with these live performances is an internet streaming of "Be My Last" available from Utada's Toshiba-EMI website. The streaming includes a performance as well as Utada answering a few questions from fans. It was available from the 11th until the 20th of November. On the television program performance at Music Station, Utada was accompanied with a cello as background music for "Be My Last" instead of the CD version which they had used for the other performances. Aya Matsuura had also covered "Be My Last" on 30 October 2005.

== Chart reception ==
"Be My Last" reached #1 on the first day of its release on the Oricon chart, and stayed the number one single of the week post that day. To date, "Be My Last" has sold at least 150,000 physical copies. In 2005, this single sold 143,916 units, making it the #70 single of 2005.

== Covers ==
In 2014, Kazuya Yoshii of The Yellow Monkey recorded the song for Utada Hikaru no Uta, a tribute album celebrating 15 years since Utada's debut.

== Track listing ==
All tracks are written by Hikaru Utada.

CD Version
No.	Title	Length
1.	"Be My Last"	4:30

DVD
No.	Title	Length
1.	"Be My Last (Music Video)"	4:30

== Chart rankings ==
Charts (2005)	Peak position
Oricon weekly singles	1
Oricon yearly singles	70

=== Certifications and sales ===
Chart	Amount
Oricon physical sales	151,000
RIAJ physical shipping certification	500,000+
RIAJ full-length cellphone downloads	500,000+
RIAJ PC downloads	100,000+
