= Jennifer Green =

American singer

- Genres: Dance
- Occupation: Singer
- Years active: 2005

Jennifer Green is a dance music artist whose Mike Rizzo-produced single "How Can I Be Falling" was major hit on the Billboard Hot Dance Music/Club Play chart, going all the way to #1 in the April 2, 2005 issue.

== See also ==
- List of number-one dance hits (United States)
- List of artists who reached number one on the US Dance chart
