= You Make Me Want to Be a Man =

- CD only artwork

Single by Utada

from the album Exodus
- Released: January 1, 2005 (remix single)
- Genre: Dance-pop; electronic
- Length: 4:37
- Label: Island Def Jam; Mercury
- Songwriter: Hikaru Utada
- Producers: Utada; Teruzane Utada

Utada singles chronology
"Be My Last" (2005)	"You Make Me Want to Be a Man" (2005)	"Passion" (2005)

Music video
- "You Make Me Want to Be a Man" on YouTube

"You Make Me Want to Be a Man" is a song recorded by Japanese-American recording artist Utada for their fifth studio album and second English album, Exodus (2004). It was written and produced by Utada, with co-production completed by Teruzane Utada. The track was inspired by Utada's relationship with their husband at the time, Kazuaki Kiriya. Its themes include sexism and understanding each other from a different perspective. "You Make Me Want to Be a Man" premiered on January 1, 2005 as the fourth and final single from the album. Self-described as an electronic and dance-pop song, it contains numerous elements including J-pop and techno.

Upon its release, "You Make Me Want to Be a Man" garnered positive reviews from music critics. Many critics commended the song's composition, lyrical content, and Hikaru's vocal and production delivery. Minor criticism was directed towards the song's production. Despite being released promotionally in North America and Japan, it failed to place on any of their record charts. Released in the United Kingdom, it failed to reach inside the top 100, peaking at number 277. "You Make Me Want to Be a Man" is their only song to chart in the UK.

The accompanying music video for "You Make Me Want to Be a Man" was shot in Tokyo by Kōji Morimoto and Kiriya; it features an android-Utada inside of an industrial-cyber utopia. Inter-cut scenes feature daily life functions, emphasizing a differentiation of human and synthetic being. The video received positive reviews for its message and visuals.

For additional promotion, the song was included on the track list of their concert tours Utada United 2006 and Utada: In the Flesh 2010.

== Background and composition ==
"It came from facing my husband dealing with someone on that honest level. It's very hard to let someone into your life that much. With the song it's like, sometimes, the things that we don't understand about each other, if I was a man, maybe I could understand him better. It's very simple, it's all about wanting to become another person and see it from another point of view."

— Utada discussing the background of "You Make Me Want to Be a Man"

"You Make Me Want to Be a Man" was inspired by Utada's relationship with their husband at the time, Kazuaki Kiriya. In a press conference for Utada's album Exodus, the artist stated "I was trying to deal with my husband, and it was the first time I really came face to face with another human being, and the things that we couldn't understand about each other, or things we argued about, I felt like it was because (that) some of it was just like a sex issue..." "I felt like if I could be a man, I could understand him more, in some ways, so I wanted to understand him, and I thought, 'I wish I were a man!'". In an interview with Female First UK, they further elaborated "it's all about wanting to become another person and see it from another point of view."

The song was selected as the fourth and final single from Exodus, the lead single for the UK editions, and was released on October 17, 2005 by Island Def Jam and Mercury. The Maxi CD version of the single contains three remixes of "You Make Me Want to Be a Man", and the accompanying music video. A bonus promo package included a separate CD and DVD of the single, and featured unreleased artwork of Exodus. A 12 inch vinyl was issued in the UK, featuring three remixes and the radio edit of the track.

"You Make Me Want to Be a Man" was written, composed, arranged, and produced by Utada, alongside co-production by Teruzane Utada. Utada described the song as "very electro" and "dance-pop" with numerous musical elements including J-pop and techno. Lucas Villa from Axs.com deciphered the themes of the track: "Tougher subjects Utada tackled on Exodus included her dissolving marriage to Kazuaki Kiriya on 'You Make Me Want to Be a Man.' She turned her frustrations about gender roles in a relationship into a feminist message, singing, 'I really want to tell you something but I can't / You make me want to be a man.'" Several critic publications, including Renowned for Sound, #PopHatesFlops, and MuuMuse, quoted similar aspects of their relationship and feminism views as key themes to the song.

== Reception ==
=== Critical response ===
"You Make Me Want to Be a Man" received favourable reviews from most music critics. David Jeffries from AllMusic wrote the extended biography to Utada, and highlighted the track as an album and career standout moment in Utada's discography. Ridwin Khan from Animefringe.com said that "You Make Me Want to Be a Man" has an "interesting hook and an energetic beat." Bradley Stern from MuuMuse was positive in his review, labelling it a "futuristic J-pop-infused creation". Lucas Villa from Axs.com commended Utada's lyrical and vocal delivery, saying that the lyrics "got her point across on the battle-born dance track." A reviewer from CD Journal gave the song a mixed review, complimenting Utada's song writing for portraying "real intentions" and praising the song's "fluctuation" of composition but also criticizing the song's production for its continuous looping.

== Music video ==
=== Background ===
The accompanying music video for "You Make Me Want to Be a Man" was directed by anime director Kōji Morimoto and Kiriya. Utada stated that because the song itself featured electro and dance genres, "it fits well with visuals. I have a lot of electronic elements with machines and stuff like that." Utada said they were influenced by their Japanese heritage, anime and otaku culture, and Japan's advances in technology during the early 2000s. They commented, "We wanted to play with the Japanese side of my existence. Japan is well know [sic] for these kinds of technological things, like Anime and the futuristic things, so I think that is what started off the whole thing." Utada revealed that they shared their creative input with Kiriya because "It's very difficult, but a bit of companionship was exactly what I needed. With most of my work I mostly just say yes or no, so I guess what I needed was someone that I could trust the taste and opinions of and have the guts to tell me about things. Somebody that I could trust with the creative side of things a little more, so that is when he came into the picture."

=== Synopsis and reception ===
Utada (pictured) with red eyes, witnessing and absorbing information of human life. The visuals and scenery were critically acclaimed by critics and publications.

The video opens with Utada's and the song's name superimposed on a CGI city, progressing with different views of it. Throughout the video, several inter-cuts of archive footage feature heavy use of modern technology and small scenes of human functionality. The first chorus features a robotic Utada lying down, with several pieces of machinery and cords impaling them. As they sing, they witness small screens of daily life, allowing them to absorb human functions and information through artificial life. Throughout he choruses, the human Utada is shown singing with their band. As several inter-cuts of archive footage appear, the verses open with another robotic Utada witnessing the small screens with red eyes.

By the second chorus, the robotic Utada is lifted into a container for further improvement. By the second verse, a robotic male companion emerges from a mercury-like substance, and is seen on a rooftop, displaying himself and the cityscape. The male snaps off a piece of his rib cage and puts it in front of him. Several cords and pieces of machinery interact with the bone, and form a mysterious light. The light then turns into a final form of the robotic Utada, covered in shiny gloss and with red eyes. The video ends with Utada on a seat, wired with machinery and cords.

The video premiered on October 19, 2005 on UK MTV and Japanese music television channels, and premiered a week later worldwide. It received positive reviews from most music critics. Tamar Anitai from MTV discussed how the video related to the original MTV reality television series Made but failed to express gender reassignment. Anitai commented, "But the one amazing transformation we’ve never seen on Made? Gender reassignment! Come on, Made! There's gotta be some girl out there who doesn't want to wear a bra anymore! And, believe it or not, we dug around in the MTV video vault and found a video buried in the WTF File that perfect embraces this sentiment: it's Japanese pop star Utada's clip, earnestly entitled, 'You Make Me Want to Be a Man.'"

== Live performances and other appearances ==
"You Make Me Want to Be a Man" has been included in numerous tours conducted by Utada, such as their Utada United 2006 tour and the Utada: In the Flesh 2010 concert tour.

"You Make Me Want to Be a Man" was included on Utada's 2010 greatest hits album, Utada the Best.

== Track listing ==
UK CD Single

1. "You Make Me Want To Be A Man (Radio Edit)" – 3:45
2. "You Make Me Want To Be A Man (Junior Jack Mix)" – 6:44
3. "You Make Me Want To Be A Man (Bloodshy & Avant Mix)" – 4:02
4. "You Make Me Want To Be A Man" (Music Video)

UK 12" Single

1. "You Make Me Want To Be A Man (Junior Jack Mix)" – 6:44
2. "You Make Me Want To Be A Man (Junior Jack Dub)" – 6:22
3. "You Make Me Want To Be A Man (Tom Neville Dub)" – 6:53
4. "You Make Me Want To Be A Man (Radio Edit)" – 3:45

== Remixes ==
Bloodshy & Avant Mix

- "You Make Me Want To Be A Man (Bloodshy & Avant Mix)" – 4:02

Junior Jack Mixes

- "You Make Me Want To Be A Man (Junior Jack Mix)" – 6:44
- "You Make Me Want To Be A Man (Junior Jack Dub)" – 6:22

Tom Neville Mixes

- "You Make Me Want To Be A Man (Tom Neville Remix)" – 7:00
- "You Make Me Want To Be A Man (Tom Neville Dub)" – 6:53

== Credits and personnel ==
- Hikaru Utada – song writing, composing, producer, programmer, vocals, background vocals
- Teruzane Utada – producer
- Gon Hotoda – recording, programming, engineer
- Bryan G. Russell – saxophone
- Kōji Morimoto – director, artwork
- Kazuaki Kiriya – director, artwork
- Universal Music Group - parent label, management
- Island Def Jam - label, management
- Mercury Records - label, management

== Weekly charts ==
Charts (2005)	Peak position
UK Singles (Official Charts)	–
