= Devil Inside (Hikaru Utada song) =

Single by Utada

from the album Exodus
- Released: September 14, 2004
- Genre: Electronic; Progressive House
- Length: 3:58
- Label: Island Def Jam (Universal)
- Songwriter: Hikaru Utada
- Producer: Hikaru Utada

Utada singles chronology
"Easy Breezy" (2004)	"Devil Inside" (2004)	"Exodus '04" (2005)

"Devil Inside" is Hikaru Utada's second English single, released under the name Utada. It is the second single from their fifth studio album, Exodus, and the first physical single released in the United States. Though it gained little mainstream attention, "Devil Inside" did do well on dance radio and hit number 10 on the Billboard Hot Dance Airplay chart, making it Utada's most played track in the United States until it was surpassed by "Come Back to Me".

The single was released on September 14, 2004. No music video was produced.

"Devil Inside (Richard Vission Radio Edit)" was featured on the hit US television series Queer as Folk, appearing early in the first episode of season 5. It was not, however, featured on the soundtrack to the series.

Devil Inside (RJD2 Mix) was featured on Utada's first English compilation album. Utada the Best.

== Track listing ==
Promo Version
No.	Title	Length
1.	"Devil Inside (Original Version)"	3:58
2.	"Devil Inside (Richard Vission Radio Edit)"	3:02
3.	"Devil Inside (The Scumfrog Radio Edit)"	4:03
4.	"Devil Inside (The Scumfrog Mix Show Edit)"	5:22
5.	"Devil Inside (The Richard Vission Experience)"	7:17
6.	"Devil Inside (The Richard Vission Duberience)"	6:01
7.	"Devil Inside (The Scum Frog Vocal Mix)"	8:02
8.	"Devil Inside (The Scum Frog Dub)"	6:41

CD Version
No.	Title	Length
1.	"Devil Inside (Album Version)"	3:58
2.	"Devil Inside (RJD2 Remix)"	4:07
3.	"Devil Inside (Richard Vission Radio Edit)"	3:02
4.	"Devil Inside (The Scumfrog Radio Edit)"	4:03
5.	"Devil Inside (Richard Vission Experience)"	7:17
6.	"Devil Inside (Richard Vission Duberience)"	6:01
7.	"Devil Inside (The Scum Frog Vocal Mix)"	7:14
8.	"Devil Inside (The Scum Frog Dub)"	6:41

Vinyl Version (Side A)
No.	Title	Length
1.	"Devil Inside (Richard "Humpty" Vission Vocal Remix)"	8:00

Vinyl Version (Side B)
No.	Title	Length
1.	"Devil Inside (The Scum Frog Vocal Mix)"	7:14

Vinyl Version (Side C)
No.	Title	Length
1.	"Devil Inside (Original Version)"	3:58
2.	"Devil Inside (RJD2 Remix)"	4:07
3.	"Wonder 'Bout"	3:48

Vinyl Version (Side D)
No.	Title	Length
1.	"Devil Inside (Richard "Humpty" Vission Dub)"	6:10
2.	"Devil Inside (The Scum Frog Dub)"	6:41

== Charts ==
=== Weekly charts ===
Chart (2004)	Peak position
US Dance Airplay (Billboard)	10
US Dance Club Songs (Billboard)	1
US Dance/Electronic Singles Sales (Billboard)	5

== See also ==
- List of number-one dance singles of 2004 (U.S.)
