= Exodus '04 =

Single by Utada

from the album Exodus
- Released: June 21, 2005
- Genre: R&B, pop
- Length: 4:32
- Label: Island Def Jam (Universal)
- Songwriters: Utada, Timbaland
- Producer: Timbaland

Utada singles chronology
"Devil Inside" (2004)	"Exodus '04" (2005)	"Be My Last" (2005)

"Exodus '04" is the 3rd English single (18th overall) by Utada, written the artist (Note: Utada uses they/them and she/her pronouns. This article uses they/them pronouns for consistency.) and Timbaland. It was released on June 21, 2005. It hit #24 on the Billboard Hot Dance/Club Airplay chart. Similarly to that of "Devil Inside," no music video was produced.

"Exodus '04 (JJ Flores Double J Radio Mix)"was featured on Utada's first English compilation album, Utada the Best.

== Track listing ==
CD Version
No.	Title	Producer(s)	Length
1.	"Exodus '04 (Double J Radio Mix)"	Utada, JJ Flores	3:44
2.	"Exodus '04 (Josh Harris' Elektrik Radio)"	Utada, Josh Harris	3:26
3.	"Exodus '04 (Josh Harris vs. The MPC Radio)"	Utada, Harris	3:43
4.	"Exodus '04 (Josh Harris' Exodus Experience)"	Utada, Harris	4:15
5.	"Exodus '04 (Double J Extended Mix)"	Utada, Harris	5:57
6.	"Exodus '04 (Peter Bailey Dub)"	Utada, Peter Bailey	7:44
7.	"Exodus '04 (JJ Flores Dub #1)"	Utada, JJ Flores	5:35
8.	"Exodus '04 (Kriya vs. Velez Progressive Trance Mix)"	Utada, Erik Velez, Carlos Galavis	6:34
9.	"Exodus '04 (Kriya vs. Velez Electro House Mix)"	Utada, Velez, Galavis	6:52
10.	"Exodus '04 (JJ Flores Dub #2)"	Utada, JJ Flores	7:12

Vinyl Version (Side A)
No.	Title	Producer(s)	Length
1.	"Exodus '04 (JJ Flores Double J Extended Remix)" (*)	Utada, JJ Flores	5:57
2.	"Exodus '04 (JJ Flores Dub #1)"	Utada, JJ Flores	5:35

Vinyl Version (Side B)
No.	Title	Producer(s)	Length
1.	"Exodus '04 (Peter Bailey Dub)"	Utada, Bailey	7:44

Vinyl Version (Side C)
No.	Title	Producer(s)	Length
1.	"Exodus '04 (Kriya vs. Velez Electro House Mix)"	Utada, Velez, Galavis	6:52
2.	"Exodus '04 (Kriya vs. Velez Progressive Trance Mix)"	Utada, Velez, Galavis	6:34

Vinyl Version (Side D)
No.	Title	Producer(s)	Length
1.	"Exodus '04 (JJ Flores Dub #2)"	Utada, JJ Flores	7:12

(*) This version is the same that appears on the CD format as Double J Extended Mix.

== Charts ==
=== Weekly charts ===
Chart (2005)	Peak position
US Dance Club Songs (Billboard)	24
US Dance/Electronic Singles Sales (Billboard)	9
