= Letters (Hikaru Utada song) =

- "Sakura Drops" / "Letters" cover.

Single by Hikaru Utada

from the album Deep River
- Released: May 9, 2002
- Recorded: 2002
- Genre: Latin American music; J-pop
- Length: 4:48
- Label: Toshiba EMI
- Songwriter: Hikaru Utada
- Producers: Kei Kawano, Akira Miyake, Teruzane Utada

Hikaru Utada singles chronology
"Hikari" (2002)	"Letters" and "Sakura Drops" (2002)	"Colors" (2003)

"Letters" is a song recorded by Japanese-American musician Hikaru Utada for their fourth studio album Deep River (2002). It was released as a double A-side single with the song "Sakura Drops" on May 9, 2002.

== Background and development ==
Since they debuted as a musician in 1998, Utada had worked as the primary or sole songwriter for their music. Beginning with their second album Distance (2001), Utada began to co-arrange songs, such as "Wait & See (Risk)", "Distance" and "Kettobase!" The bonus track on Distance, "Hayatochi-Remix", was arranged entirely by Utada. In March 2002, Hikaru Utada released "Hikari", the theme song for the game Kingdom Hearts.

"Letters" was written and arranged solely by Utada. It featured six different guitarists all performing the acoustic guitar in the backing, including Char, Hisashi from Glay, and Teruzane Utada.

== Promotion and release ==
The song was used in commercials for NTT DoCoMo's 2002 range of FOMA cellphones. This was the third song of Utada's to be used in collaboration with DoCoMo, after "Final Distance" (2001) and "Traveling" (2002). On May 20, 2002, Utada performed the song live at Hey! Hey! Hey! Music Champ, a week after they performed the single's other A-side "Sakura Drops".

Utada performed the song during their Hikaru no 5 Budokan residency show in 2004, during the Utada United 2006 Japanese tour, and at the two date concert series Wild Life in December 2010.

== Covers ==
In 2014, "Letters" was recorded by Ringo Sheena for Utada Hikaru no Uta, a tribute album celebrating 15 years since Utada's debut. It was released as a preceding download from the album on December 3, 2014.

== Critical reception ==
Critical reception to the song was positive. Hayashi of Ongaku DB felt "Letters" was a "Latin-sounding number" with a melody that had a "high level of freedom". CDJournal reviewers described the song as having a "spicy Latin/gypsy" sound, and praised the "passionate melody", and noted how the upbeat rhythm contrasted with the lyrics, which dealt with "melancholic everyday feelings". Kanako Hanakawa of Shinko Music felt that the song had a mature mood, and that it was "sexier" than their other songs due to the guitar backing of so many older male guitarists. Akiyoshi Sekine of CD Data praised the song's "percussive rhythm", and praised the skill and sense that went into Utada's arrangement of the song.

== Track listing ==
All tracks are written by Hikaru Utada.

"Sakura Drops" / "Letters" single
No.	Title	Arranger	Length
1.	"Sakura Drops"	Utada, Kei Kawano	5:01
2.	"Letters"	Kawano, Utada	4:48
3.	"Sakura Drops (Original Karaoke)"	Utada, Kei Kawano	5:01
4.	"Letters (Original Karaoke)"	Kawano, Utada	4:48
Total length:			9:59

== Personnel ==
Personnel details were sourced from Deep River's liner notes booklet.

- Hironori Akiyama – acoustic guitar
- Char – acoustic guitar
- Hisashi from Glay – acoustic guitar
- Yuichiro Larry Honda – acoustic guitar
- Goh Hotoda – recording
- Tsunemi Kawahide – synthesizer programming
- Kei Kawano – acoustic piano, arrangement, keyboards, programming
- Atsushi Matsui – recording
- Akira Miyake – production
- Yuji Toriyama – acoustic guitar
- Masaaki Ugajin – recording
- Hikaru Utada – arrangement, producer, writing, vocals
- Teruzane "Sking" Utada – acoustic guitar, production

== Charts ==
Chart (2002)	Peak position
Japan Oricon weekly singles: "Sakura Drops" / "Letters"	1

=== Sales and certifications ===
Chart	Amount
Oricon physical sales: "Sakura Drops" / "Letters"	687,000
RIAJ physical certification: "Sakura Drops" / "Letters"	2× Platinum (800,000)

== Release history ==
Region	Date	Format	Distributing Label	Catalog codes
Japan	May 9, 2002	CD single	Toshiba EMI	TOCT-4381
Taiwan	May 9, 2002	CD single	Gold Typhoon	55088529
Japan	April 1, 2004	Digital download	Toshiba EMI	
South Korea	September 30, 2005	Digital download	Universal Music Korea	
