= This Is the One =

- Digital cover

Studio album by Utada
- Released: March 13, 2009
- Recorded: 2007–2009
- Genres: Pop; R&B
- Length: 37:09 (Standard version); 45:35 (Japanese version)
- Label: Island
- Producers: Utada; Sking U; Stargate; Christopher "Tricky" Stewart

Utada chronology
Heart Station (2008)	This Is the One (2009)	Utada Hikaru Single Collection Vol. 2 Utada the Best (2010)

Singles from This Is the One
- 1. "Come Back to Me" Released: February 10, 2009; 2. "Sanctuary" Released: July 21, 2009 (Japan only); 3. "Dirty Desire" Released: December 21, 2009

This Is the One is the eighth studio album and third English language album by Japanese-American singer-songwriter Hikaru Utada, released by Island Records in the United States digitally on March 24, 2009 and physically on May 12, 2009. The album was originally set to be released in Japan on March 4 but was pushed back to March 14. The album was only released in North America, Japan and some parts of Asia. In Japan, the album topped the Oricon's International Album chart and peaked at number three on the Weekly chart. In the United States, the album peaked at number 69 on the Billboard 200 chart. This Is the One was the supporting album of Utada's 2010 tour Utada: In the Flesh 2010. On December 21, 2009, the "Dirty Desire" remixes were released.

This Is the One marked Utada's last album with Island Records, and the Universal Music Group at that time, not only due to the end of their contract, but also due to their 2010 global recording contract with EMI Music. It was the last album to be released under their Western stage name Utada, with further releases using their full name. In 2013, EMI Music Japan merged with Universal Music Japan following the global merger between the two music groups. Thus, their sixth Japanese album, Fantôme, marked the last release with Universal Music Group as a whole before they moved to Epic Records Japan.

== Background ==
On October 23, 2007, Utada wrote a message on their Japanese blog stating that they were writing and recording demos for their next English album while simultaneously completing their fifth Japanese studio album. During their interview with Ningin on February 3, 2009, Utada stated that they wanted to make a "mainstream" album, and the result was a more R&B influenced album. In an interview with Kiwibox on February 20, 2009, Utada explained that the title of the album came about because they were going for a more mainstream sound for this record, and that it would be the "breakout" album.

A 2026 remastered version of This Is the One was released by Universal Japan on June 24, 2026 in CD, vinyl and digital formats. Due to vocal mastering errors for "Dirty Desire", the album was later pulled from stores. On September 4, 2026, This Is the One was rereleased on CD and digital platforms.

== Recording ==
Utada worked with various other artists on several tracks, including Stargate produced, prematurely published "Apple and Cinnamon" and sometime later at least one other track produced by Christopher "Tricky" Stewart. On January 9, their subject-exclusive blog indicated that they were nearing completion of the album, and said of the work involved, "If this were a live show, I'm at the painful part about two songs before the break for the encore." They also stated that, upon completion of the album production, they would post their first new English blog message of the year. Official Japanese and English press releases posted online January 22 confirmed that Utada had worked with producers Stargate and C. "Tricky" Stewart, and that the album's recording had taken place in New York, Atlanta, and Tokyo, and 10 songs were written (by them) for the project. In a blog post dated January 31, Utada mentioned that they had decided on the sequence of songs that day, and that the album was soon to be mastered. They also wrote that the title would soon be announced. Later, in an issue of Japanese magazine WHAT'S IN?, two more track titles were revealed ("Poppin'" and "Automatic Part II") as well as other information regarding the upcoming release. It was reported that Utada was in the studio with Stargate for roughly one hour, while the majority of the rest of the album's production was completed separately by transfer of data between Japan, New York, and Norway.

== Promotion ==
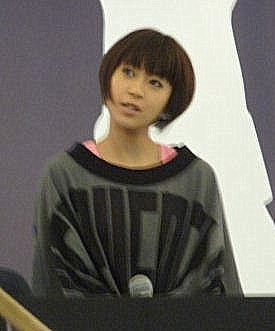
Utada at Sephora in New York

On February 3, Utada had a two-part interview with Ningin's Asian Media Online community to further promote their new music. On February 6, Island Records took out an advertisement for Utada's first single "Come Back to Me" on radio industry news site FMBQ. On February 14, Utada had an interview with GossipGirls where they talked about the new concept for This Is the One. On February 20, Utada had an interview with Kiwibox.com to further promote their upcoming album. On March 3, Asiance Magazine interviewed Utada about their upcoming album. Beginning March 18, Utada made radio tours in the West Coast to promote the album, stopping at radio stations in Seattle, Portland, Reno, Sacramento, San Francisco, and Los Angeles. Utada hosted listening parties at select Sephora beauty and cosmetics stores in Los Angeles on March 24, in New York on March 25, and in Miami on March 27 to further promote the album. On March 23, the music video for the lead single "Come Back to Me" was released as the 'Free Music Video of the Week' on the U.S. iTunes Store. On March 24, Utada performed "Come Back to Me", "Merry Christmas Mr. Lawrence - FYI", and "Me Muero" live on Los Angeles KTLA Morning News. On March 28, Utada performed on the CBS program, The Early Show Saturday Edition.

On 21 December 2009, Utada released the "Dirty Desire" remixes. Although classified as a single, no music video was produced, and promotional activities were minimal. This single was mainly used to promote Utada's In the Flesh 2010 tour. The song peaked on the US Dance Club Songs chart at 16.

== Critical reception ==
Professional ratings
Review scores
Source	Rating
AllMusic	3.5/5 stars

This Is the One received generally positive reviews. Adam Benjamin Irby of Bleu Magazine wrote "This Is the One is an exceptional album that will with the right promotion definitely breathe some life into what's becoming a stale pop music scene in America". David Jeffries of AllMusic gave This Is the One a positive review, stating that "Utada the performer is clearly defined here with slick, polished production supporting their songs rather than dominating them", but that "most of her lyrics are riddled with clichés with plenty of 'whispers in the dark'". Jeffries also mentioned that "Big, behind-the-scene names like Chris "Tricky" Stewart and Antonio "LA" Reid point to the urban meets pop attitude of the album, but Utada will not be overshadowed. This album is theirs alone and when placed next to Exodus, it's aptly titled".

Other critics were less favorable. Michael Botsford of AudioScribber gave the album six out of ten, opining that the main issue with the album was its obvious influence from American R&B, commenting "[...]we were half expecting Fat Man Scoop to intercept the music and demand we put our hands in the air". He also wrote the album was an "undeniably cute and charming album", and "if she stopped aiming to please the mainstream, this album would have scored a higher rating". Daniel Robson of The Japan Times panned the album, saying that by hiring the superproducers behind other successful acts, Utada "basically makes her music as bland, accessible and predictable as possible". He noted some good songs on the album and said the album was "practically x-rated at times" due to songs like "Dirty Desire" and "Automatic Part II"; where they sing "During my 9 to 5, I'm thinking six and nine" and "Contraceptive, when I'm on it, it's automatic" on the respective songs.

== Commercial performance ==
In Japan, This Is the One debuted at number three on the Oricon Weekly chart, selling 77,832 copies in its first week. On the Oricon Foreign Album chart the album debuted atop the chart and would stay at number one for six consecutive weeks. In America fueled by downloads alone, the album debuted on the Billboard 200 at number 178 and number six on the Top Heatseekers chart, selling 5,000 units. The album re-entered the Billboard 200 on the issue date of May 30, 2009, peaking at number 69 with 6,915 units sold and then fell to number 137 the following week with 3,873 units sold. However, the album overall did not outsell their debut album, Exodus, selling a total of more than 16,000 units in the United States alone (versus Exodus which sold more than 55,000 copies). This Is the One sold 300,000 units worldwide.

== Track listing ==
Standard version
No.	Title	Writer(s)	Producer(s)	Length
1.	"Come Back to Me"	Utada, M.S. Eriksen, T.E. Hermansen	Utada, Stargate, Sking U	3:56
2.	"Me Muero"	Utada, Eriksen, Hermansen	Utada, Stargate, Sking U	3:25
3.	"Merry Christmas Mr. Lawrence – FYI"	Utada, Eriksen, Hermansen, Ryuichi Sakamoto	Utada, Stargate, Sking U	3:49
4.	"Apple and Cinnamon"	Utada, Eriksen, Hermansen	Utada, Stargate, Sking U	4:38
5.	"Taking My Money Back"	Utada, C. "Tricky" Stewart	Utada, Stewart, Sking U	3:13
6.	"This One (Crying Like a Child)"	Utada, Eriksen, Hermansen	Utada, Stargate, Sking U	4:30
7.	"Automatic Part II"	Utada, S. Hall, Stewart	Utada, Stewart, Sean K., Kuk Harrell	3:01
8.	"Dirty Desire"	Utada, Stewart	Utada, Stewart, Kuk Harrell, Sking U	3:51
9.	"Poppin'"	Utada, Eriksen, Hermansen	Utada, Stargate, Sking U	3:31
10.	"On and On"	Utada, Hall, Stewart	Utada, Sean K., Stewart	3:25
Total length:				37:09

US physical release bonus tracks
No.	Title	Producer(s)	Length
11.	"Simple and Clean"	Utada, Akira Miyake, Sking U	5:03
12.	"Sanctuary (Opening)"	Utada, Akira Miyake, Sking U	4:25
13.	"Sanctuary (Ending)"	Utada, Akira Miyake, Sking U	5:58
Total length:			52:35

Note

- The standard version track list was released in countries like South Korea, Malaysia, Hong Kong, and others than the United States and Japan, with only ten tracks without the bonus tracks.

=== Japanese version ===
- The Japanese version of This Is the One has a slightly altered track listing (in both physical and digital formats).
- All songs written and produced by Utada; others who also worked on the album are given below.

No.	Title	Writer(s)	Producer(s)	Length
1.	"On and On"	Utada, Hall, Stewart	Utada, Sean K., Stewart	3:25
2.	"Merry Christmas Mr. Lawrence – FYI"	Utada, Eriksen, Hermansen, Ryuichi Sakamoto	Utada, Stargate, Sking U	3:49
3.	"Apple and Cinnamon"	Utada, Eriksen, Hermansen	Utada, Stargate, Sking U	4:38
4.	"Taking My Money Back"	Utada, Stewart	Utada, Stewart, Sking U	3:13
5.	"This One (Crying Like a Child)"	Utada, Eriksen, Hermansen	Utada, Stargate, Sking U	4:30
6.	"Automatic Part II"	Utada, S. Hall, Stewart	Utada, Stewart, Sean K., Kuk Harrell	3:01
7.	"Dirty Desire"	Utada, Stewart	Utada, Stewart, Kuk Harrell, Sking U	3:51
8.	"Poppin'"	Utada, Eriksen, Hermansen	Stargate, Sking U	3:31
9.	"Come Back to Me"	Utada, Eriksen, Hermansen	Utada, Stargate, Sking U	3:56
10.	"Me Muero"	Utada, Eriksen, Hermansen	Utada, Stargate, Sking U	3:25
11.	"Come Back to Me" (Seamus Haji & Paul Emanuel Radio Edit)			4:03
12.	"Come Back to Me" (Quentin Harris Radio Edit)			4:23
Total length:				45:35

== Charts and sales ==
=== Weekly charts ===
Chart (2009)	Peak position
Japanese Albums (Oricon)	3
Japan International Albums (Oricon)	1
Taiwan International Albums (G-Music)	5
Taiwan Western Albums (G-Music)	2
US Billboard 200	69
US Top Heatseekers (Billboard)	6

=== Year-end charts ===
Chart (2009)	Position
Japanese Albums (Oricon)	29

== Sales ==
Region	Certification	Certified units/sales
Japan (RIAJ)	Platinum	242,657
United States (Billboard)	—	16,000

== Release history ==
Country	Date	Distributing label
Japan	March 13, 2009	Universal Music Japan
Japan	September 4, 2026 (Streaming and CD 2026 Remaster)	Universal Music Japan
United States	March 24, 2009 (Digital)	Island
United States	May 12, 2009 (Physical)	Island
Canada	March 24, 2009 (Digital)	Universal Music Group
Canada	June 23, 2009 (Physical)	Universal Music Group
South Korea	March 24, 2009	Universal Music Group
Hong Kong	March 24, 2009	Universal Music Group
Taiwan	March 24, 2009	Universal Music Group
Thailand	April 2, 2009	Universal Music Group
Worldwide	May 12, 2009	Universal Music Group
