= Quentin Harris =

American musician

Quentin Harris (born 8 September 1970 in Detroit, Michigan) is a New York City-based house music producer, remixer and DJ. He is active in the gay, underground, and pop-dance music scenes. He is best known for his 2005 club hit Let’s Be Young.

== Early career ==
Quentin Harris' early influences included DJ Ken Collier, Timmy Regisford, David Morales, Frankie Knuckles, Junior Vasquez, and Danny Tenaglia. Harris began studio work as an intern for Michael J. Powell at his Detroit recording studio, where he eventually began playing on sessions for artists such as Aretha Franklin, Biochemists, and Anita Baker. He was invited to do production for the Master Minds in New York, and became their touring DJ in 1997–1998. Harris moved to New York to produce pop, R&B and hip hop.

== House career ==
Harris considers his big break to be the remix he did of Donnie's Cloud 9. "That was the record that started the whirlwind", said Harris. "There was such demand for it. Everybody was clamoring for it, everyone wanted it, and no one could get it. It was crazy." In 2005, his original track, Let’s Be Young gave him widespread recognition across Europe. His singles include "Traveling" (2004), "Let's Be Young" (2005), "Can't Stop" (2008, featuring Jason Walker) and "My Joy" (2008).

In addition to solo productions, Harris has worked with well-known artists such as Monique Bingham, Robert Owens and Joi Cardwell, and Mariah Carey. His many remixes include Don't Forget about Us by Mariah Carey (2005), "My Love" by Justin Timberlake (2006), and "I Refuse" by Aaron-Carl Ragland (2009). He also produced a remix for "Guilty", a leaked song from 2004, by Britney Spears' album In The Zone. At the time, the remix from the song leaked, along with the Junior Vasquez edit, which is a bit longer. In 2009, Harris remixed Japanese-American pop singer Utada's single Come Back to Me.

Harris also ran a house music party called Kiss My Black Ass (KMBA) in New York City, with occasional events in other cities such as San Francisco and Toronto.

Quentin Harris' debut artist album, No Politics, released in 2006 included collaborations with François Kevorkian, Danny Krivit, David Morales, Danny Tenaglia and Frankie Knuckles. In 2010, he released his second album, Sacrifice.
