= Goodbye Happiness =

Single by Hikaru Utada

from the album Utada Hikaru Single Collection Vol. 2
- Released: November 10, 2010
- Recorded: August 2010
- Genre: J-pop; dance-pop; electropop
- Length: 5:21
- Label: EMI Music Japan
- Songwriter: Hikaru Utada
- Producer: Hikaru Utada

Hikaru Utada singles chronology
"Hymne à l'amour (Ai no Anthem)" (2010)	"Goodbye Happiness" (2010)	"Sakura Nagashi" (2012)

Audio sample
- "Goodbye Happiness": file; help

Music video
- "Goodbye Happiness" on YouTube

"Goodbye Happiness" is a song by Japanese-American singer-songwriter Hikaru Utada. It was released as the lead track from Utada's second Japanese compilation album, Utada Hikaru Single Collection Vol. 2, in November 2010. The song was commercially successful, topping Billboard's Japan Hot 100 chart in December 2010, and in January 2011 was certified gold by the RIAJ for more than 100,000 full-length downloads to cellphones.

== Composition and inspiration ==
The song is a pop/electronic song with an arrangement consisting of piano, vocal harmonies, percussion and synths, with occasional background 8-bit sounds. The song features background vocals by four women recorded in London in August 2010, described in the documentary Hikaru Utada: Ima no Watashi, as Celtic. Utada chose this singing style for its nostalgic, dream-like qualities. This is the first instance of background vocals in a Hikaru Utada song not being performed by them.

The chorus features increased string instrument-style synths and percussion. The lyrics begin by describing different scenes, a boy in a summer day who has eaten his sweets, and a sunburnt woman wearing a dirty white dress. The lyrics then describe a relationship at the "end of a dream." The song's protagonist hums love songs to themselves, and has fun without thinking. They realise they cannot rebuild their relationship, and notices that "when people become alone, they realise the meaning of love." However, they believe it will be good for them to keep living how they are now.

Utada wrote the song while attempting to write a love song. They consider the lyrics to be a reconciliation with their former self.

== Promotion ==
The song was used in an advertising commercial campaign for Recochoku digital media store, with the commercial airing from November 10 onwards. The music video was bundled on a special DVD that came with pre-orders of the album.

The song was performed during Utada's two date concert series Wild Life in December 2010.

== Music video ==
Utada in the music video.

The music video was directed by Hikaru Utada personally, the first time Utada has worked as a music video director. As a director, Utada used their birth name in kanji (宇多田光), as opposed to their stage name. Originally Utada planned to have a director other than themselves for the music video, however, during meetings with the director, they realised that they were the only person who could express things in the way that they wanted.

The video has a concept of Utada as a presenter, and attempted to incorporate entertaining aspects. Utada felt the video had a feeling of looking back on their past self. The video was recorded in a single take, and is shot from a static camera. In the video, Utada sits down at a desk in a bedroom and mimes to the song. They wear headphones, similar to their video for "Heart Station". Hand-puppets mime parts of the song, two worn by Utada, and others held by people off-screen. During the chorus, Utada pushes aside their desk chair and dances in the room. During the second chorus, the room darkens and Utada dances on a yellow chair, similar to that of the video for "Automatic". During the bridge, they stand in front of a blackboard with mathematical formulas on it. During the instrumental section of the song, the room darkens and a disco ball lowers. Utada then dons the head piece of their kigurumi Kuma-Chang outfit, similar to their ad campaign for Recochoku in 2008. The video ends with Utada dancing with a flag and a hat like the video for "Traveling". A pizza delivery man arrives, with a pizza box full of doves.

The video was shot in a set, not Utada's personal bedroom, although many of the items in the room are owned by them.

The video has references to video sharing site YouTube. At the start of the video, the YouTube loading symbol appears. In the bottom left corner of the screen, a fake logo reading "UTube" can be seen, and at the end of the video, false suggestions to view Utada's other videos are shown, in the manner that YouTube suggests related videos at the end of viewing something. The suggested videos are all the ones previously referenced.

The video was uploaded onto YouTube on November 9, 2010, as the first video on Utada's newly established official YouTube channel.

== Charts ==
=== Weekly charts ===
Chart (2010)	Peak position
Billboard Japan Adult Contemporary Airplay	1
Billboard Japan Hot 100	1
RIAJ Digital Track Chart Top 100	8

=== Year-end charts ===
Chart (2011)	Peak position
Billboard Japan Hot 100	79

== Certifications ==
Chart	Amount
RIAJ full-length cellphone downloads	Gold (100,000+)

== Release history ==
Region	Date	Format
Japan	November 1, 2010	Radio add date
Japan	November 3, 2010	Ringtone
Japan	November 10, 2010	Full-length cellphone download
Japan	November 17, 2010	PC download
