= Audio Playground =

Canadian dance-pop band

- Origin: Edmonton, Alberta, Canada
- Genres: Dance, pop
- Years active: 2009-Present
- Label: Sony Music Canada,
- Members: Rubix; DSL; Anthony Gitto
- Website: www.audioplayground.info (defunct)

Audio Playground is a Canadian dance-pop band formed in August 2009 in Edmonton, Alberta. The band consists of producers Rubix and DSL and vocalist Anthony Gitto.

== Career ==
In 2009, the trio released their first single, "A Little Respect", produced in seven variations. They did the same in 2010 with "Shadows". These variations included pop music, dance music, electro, UK hard house, latin music, hip hop music and urban contemporary music. They also used various languages—mostly English, French and Spanish, to maximize the reach of their audience.

"A Little Respect", a remake of the hit song by Erasure, was No. 1 in Canada on the single sales chart for 7 weeks, trailed by songs from Lady Gaga, Madonna, The Black Eyed Peas, and U2.

In 2012, they opened a studio in Montreal and started collaborating with other acts, including Snoop Dogg in "Emergency" and "You Never Know (Could You Be Loved)". They also collaborated with Kardinal Offishal in "Famous". Both songs reached No. 10 on the U.S. Billboard Dance Chart. Additional collaborations followed, including with Wyclef Jean, Kendrick Lamar, and Flo Rida.

In April 2013, the group signed a distribution agreement with Sony Music Canada. Their first release under that agreement was the multi-lingual hit single "You Never Know", their second collaboration with Snoop Dogg (then known as Snoop Lion) which peaked at No. 5 on the US Billboard dance chart and was a national radio hit in Canada, garnering over 11,000 BDS radio spins according to Nielsen Soundscan. The song pays homage to Bob Marley's classic "Could You Be Loved" and was recorded in five languages: "On Ne Sait Jamais" (French), "Amame" (Spanish), "Mai Dire Mai" (Italian), and "Sagapo" (Greek).

Their next hit, "Hands Up in the Air" hit No. 1 on the U.S. Billboard Dance chart in 2014. The French-language video of "Hands Up In The Air", featured Canadian gymnast Kelsey Titmarsh.

== Discography ==
=== Singles ===
Year	Single	Peak positions			Album
Year	Single	CAN	US Dance	US Dance Club	Album
2009	"(A Little) Respect"	77	—	—	Singles only
2010	"Shadows"	—	8	—	Singles only
2011	"Famous" (featuring Kardinal Offishall)	39	38	10	Singles only
2012	"Emergency" (featuring Snoop Dogg)	71	—	13	Singles only
2013	"You Never Know (Could You Be Loved)" (featuring Snoop Lion)	77	—	5	Singles only
2014	"Hands Up in the Air"	—	—	1	Singles only
"—" denotes releases that did not chart
