= Easy Breezy =

Single by Utada

from the album Exodus
- Released: August 3, 2004
- Genre: Electropop; R&B
- Length: 4:03
- Label: Island Def Jam
- Songwriter: Hikaru Utada
- Producer: Hikaru Utada

Utada singles chronology
| "Dareka no Negai ga Kanau Koro" (2004) | "Easy Breezy" (2004) | "Devil Inside" (2004) |

Music video
- "Easy Breezy" on YouTube

"Easy Breezy" is Utada's debut English single (16th overall). It is also the first single from their fifth studio album, Exodus, in which it also appears. For this release, they are using Island Def Jam as their label, under the name of simply Utada, rather than Hikaru Utada which was used for their Japanese releases. This was originally released as an exclusive download single, though was later released as a DVD single in Japan. This song has been used in several Nintendo DS endorsements featuring Utada. There was a promo single for Easy Breezy that was sent to radio stations that features an exclusive radio edit of the song. The cover is the same as for the DVD single. The single sold 2,731 copies in Korea.

== Music video ==
The video for "Easy Breezy", directed by Jake Nava, depicts Utada in various locations, including a pool, their bedroom, and in a car (Ferrari Dino), all while celebrating their freedom from their former romantic interest.

== Track listing ==
Promo Version
| No. | Title | Length |
|---|---|---|
| 1. | "Easy Breezy (Radio Edit)" | 3:04 |
| 2. | "Easy Breezy (Call Out Hook)" | 0:13 |

DVD Version
| No. | Title | Length |
|---|---|---|
| 1. | "Making of Easy Breezy" | 7:26 |
| 2. | "Easy Breezy" | 3:14 |

Digital Version
| No. | Title | Length |
|---|---|---|
| 1. | "Easy Breezy" | 4:03 |

Ultimix Version
| No. | Title | Length |
|---|---|---|
| 1. | "Utada – Easy Breezy (94BPM)" | 5:05 |

The Ultimix version is found on Ultimix 108 as track 3, remixed by Stacy Mier.

== Charts ==
"Easy Breezy" – Oricon Sales Chart (Japan)

| Release | Chart | Peak Position | Sales Total | Chart Run |
|---|---|---|---|---|
| August 3, 2004 | Oricon Daily Singles Chart | No Rank | No Rank | No Rank |
| August 3, 2004 | Oricon Weekly Singles Chart | No Rank | No Rank | No Rank |
| August 3, 2004 | Oricon Yearly Singles Chart | No Rank | No Rank | No Rank |
