= Dirty Desire =

Single by Utada

from the album This Is the One
- Released: December 21, 2009
- Length: 3:51
- Label: Island Def Jam
- Songwriter(s): Utada; C. "Tricky" Stewart
- Producer(s): Utada; Stewart; Kuk Harrell; Sking U

Utada singles chronology
"Come Back to Me" (2009)	"Dirty Desire" (2009)	"Hymne à l'amour (Ai no Anthem)" (2010)

"Dirty Desire" is a song by Japanese-American singer-songwriter Utada. The single was released exclusively in the fourth quarter of 2009 as a promotional single to US dance/club radio. The single later received a digital commercial release in December 2009 and peaked on the US Billboard Dance Club Songs chart at number 16.

== Composition ==
The song itself is about fantasizing over someone who is already in a relationship (somewhat similar to "Tippy Toe" from 2004's Exodus). It features repetition of the title, as though "dirty desire" is the only thing that can be thought of when thinking of said person. It has playful lyrics, such as with the line "And in my fantasies I love you long time". The song itself features synths and a very prominent drum beat, that lasts throughout the entire song. It finishes with the repeated line "Bring that beat back!" before fading out.

== Promotion and reception ==
In a review of This Is the One, Adam Benjamin Irby of Bleu Magazine called "Dirty Desire" his favourite song from the album, partly due to its "in-your-face sexual departure from her past work", and going on to say the song is "pure pop perfection". Not all reception was positive, as Daniel Robson of The Japan Times stated that the song is almost X-rated, particularly on the line "During my 9 to 5 / I'm thinking six and nine". He also added "Is this what it takes to find Stateside success? Whoring yourself both musically and lyrically?".

== Track listing ==
"Dirty Desire" Remixes
No.	Title	Length
1.	"Dirty Desire" (Mike Rizzo Radio Edit)	3:34
2.	"Dirty Desire" (Digital Dog Radio Edit)	2:35
3.	"Dirty Desire" (Razor N' Guido Radio Edit)	3:49
4.	"Dirty Desire" (Mike Rizzo Club Mix*)	7:05
5.	"Dirty Desire" (Digital Dog Club Mix)	6:02
6.	"Dirty Desire" (Razor N' Guido Club Mix)	8:20
7.	"Dirty Desire" (Mike Rizzo Dub Mix)	6:41
8.	"Dirty Desire" (Digital Dog Dub Mix)	6:20
9.	"Dirty Desire" (Razor N' Guido Dub Mix)	6:20

- also known as the "Mike Rizzo Funk Generation Club Mix"

== Charts ==
Chart performance for "Dirty Desire"
Chart (2010)	Peak position
US Dance Club Songs (Billboard)	16

== Release history ==
Release history and formats for "Dirty Desire"
Region	Date	Format
Japan	December 21, 2009	Download
United States	December 21, 2009	Download
