= Come Back to Me (Hikaru Utada song) =

Single by Utada

from the album This Is the One
- Released: January 21, 2009
- Recorded: 2008
- Genre: Pop; R&B
- Length: 3:58
- Label: Island Def Jam
- Songwriters: Hikaru Utada; Stargate
- Producers: Stargate; Utada; Sking U

Utada singles chronology
"Prisoner of Love" (2009)	"Come Back to Me" (2009)	"Dirty Desire" (2009)

Audio sample
- file; help

"Come Back to Me" is a pop and R&B song by Japanese–American singer Hikaru Utada, released under the mononymous moniker Utada. The song was written by Utada and Stargate and was produced by Utada, Stargate, and Teruzane Utada. "Come Back to Me" is the first single from Utada's eighth studio album This Is the One. In the United States, the song has peaked at number five on the Billboard Hot Dance Club Play and number 69 on the Pop 100 chart.

== Background ==
The production of "Come Back to Me" started in 2008. Utada took a few demo tracks that Stargate had produced and just started to write. "Come Back to Me" was chosen as the lead single because Utada felt the song "enters the listener naturally" and "comes into them easily".

== Critical reception ==
Adam Benjamin Irby of Bleu Magazine called the song a "Mariah-esque" song, that is musically reminiscent of "We Belong Together". Michael Botsford of AudioScribbler said that the song is "cheesier than your local pizzeria's finest, but it knows it. It's a not a song that we warmed to, but I imagine every teenage girl in the country who's suffered a break up will well up at the eyes when they hear it."

== Chart performance ==
The single entered the Billboard Pop 100 Airplay and Hot Dance Club Play chart on the issue date of March 28, 2009 at number 75 and number 43 respectively. The single peaked at number 69 and number 5 on their respective charts. On the Billboard Pop 100 chart, the single debuted at number 93 on the issue date of April 11, 2009. On the issue date of May 9, 2009, "Come Back to Me" entered the Rhythmic Airplay Chart at number 39.

== Music video ==
The music video for "Come Back to Me" was directed by Anthony Mandler and was filmed in two days, January 27 and 28, 2009. The theme of the video comes from the fashion style of the 1920s. The video premiered on February 27, 2009.

The video starts with Utada playing a Vox piano. As they sing, they reminisce on the times shared with their ex-boyfriend.

== Track listing ==
iTunes track listing (Single)
No.	Title	Length
1.	"Come Back to Me"	3:57

iTunes track listing (Remixes)
No.	Title	Length
1.	"Come Back to Me (Tony Moran & Warren Rigg Club Mix)"	9:12
2.	"Come Back to Me (Tony Moran & Warren Rigg Radio Edit)"	4:31
3.	"Come Back to Me (Seamus Haji & Paul Emanuel Club Mix)"	8:19
4.	"Come Back to Me (Seamus Haji & Paul Emanuel Radio Edit"	4:03
5.	"Come Back to Me (Tony Moran & Warren Rigg Dub)"	8:07

Other versions

- "Come Back to Me (Instrumental)" (3:57)
- "Come Back to Me (Quentin Harris Radio Edit)" (4:24)
- "Come Back to Me (Quentin Harris Club Mix)" (8:03)
- "Come Back to Me (Quentin Harris Dub)" (8:01)
- "Come Back to Me (Mike Rizzo Radio Edit)" (3:15)
- "Come Back to Me (Mike Rizzo Funk Generation Club Mix)" (7:57) - Mike Rizzo also produced this mix, however it wasn't officially released, so was leaked by Rizzo himself.
1. Both "Come Back to Me (Seamus Haji & Paul Emanuel Radio Edit)" and "Come Back to Me (Quentin Harris Radio Edit)" were featured as bonus tracks on the Japanese release of This Is the One.
2. "Come Back to Me (Tony Moran & Warren Rigg Radio Edit)" was featured on Utada's first English compilation album, Utada the Best.

== Charts ==
Chart (2009)	Peak position
Japan (Japan Hot 100)	3
Japan Digital Track Chart (RIAJ)	32
Japan Reco-kyō Ringtones (RIAJ)	34
US Dance Airplay (Billboard)	11
US Dance Club Songs (Billboard)	5
US Global Dance Tracks (Billboard)	28
US Pop 100 (Billboard)	69
US Rhythmic Airplay (Billboard)	39

== Certification ==
Chart	Amount
RIAJ full-length cellphone downloads	100,000+

== Release history ==
Region	Date	Format
Japan	January 21, 2009	Airplay
Japan	February 18, 2009	Digital Download
United States	February 10, 2009	Airplay, Digital Download
