= Exodus (Hikaru Utada album) =

Studio album by Utada
- Released: September 8, 2004
- Genres: Pop; electronica; R&B
- Length: 54:15
- Labels: Island; Mercury
- Producers: Utada; Timbaland; Danja; Sking U

Utada chronology
Utada Hikaru Single Collection Vol. 1 (2004)	Exodus (2004)	Ultra Blue (2006)

Alternative cover
- UK album cover

Singles from Exodus
- 1. "Easy Breezy" Released: August 3, 2004; 2. "Devil Inside" Released: September 14, 2004; 3. "Exodus '04" Released: June 21, 2005; 4. "You Make Me Want to Be a Man" Released: October 17, 2005

Exodus is the fifth studio album and second English-language album by Japanese-American singer-songwriter Hikaru Utada, released on September 8, 2004 by Island Records under the moniker Utada. Their first English-language album called Precious was released under the name "Cubic U". After being discovered in North America by Island CEO Lyon Cohen when they contributed to the Rush Hour 2 soundtrack, he was interested in signing Utada to his record label and they eventually accepted the offer. They traveled to New York City to sign the contract and began recording the studio album straight after their signing. However, during the time frame from 2002 to 2003, Utada was diagnosed with a benign ovarian tumour that needed surgery and treatment. They also married their then-husband Kazuaki Kiriya, which stopped recording temporarily.

Musically, Exodus incorporates several musical genres including dance music and electronic music, whilst also incorporating several elements from electronica, avant-garde, alternative and glitch music. Exodus is their first studio album to have full English-language tracks since their album Precious under the alias Cubic U. The majority of the tracks on the album were written, composed and produced by Utada, with additional contributions completed by Timbaland, Danja and Teruzane Utada. Lyrically, the album deals with several human-related stories from a third-person perspective. Themes incorporated inside the album are love, prostitution, lust, their heritage, and break-ups.

Upon its release, Exodus received positive reviews from most contemporary music critics. Many critics complimented the composition experimentation and Utada's vocal deliveries on certain tracks. However, critics were divided towards the lyrical content and felt the production and album was only trying to attract a wider audience through the Western market. Exodus was a commercial success in Japan, peaking at number one and sold over one million units in the country, making it Utada's highest-selling English studio album there. It was certified one million by the Recording Industry Association of Japan (RIAJ). In North America, Exodus peaked at number 160 on the Billboard 200.

Four singles were released from the album. The first single "Easy Breezy" failed to gain success in both Eastern and Western territories, but the following single "Devil Inside" peaked at number one on the US Hot Dance Club Songs, making it their highest charting effort regarding any Billboard chart. The final North American single "Exodus '04" charted moderately in America overall, while the lead UK single "You Make Me Want to Be a Man" failed to achieve higher success in that region as well. To promote the album, Utada had commenced their Utada Hikaru In Budokan 2004 tour.

== Background ==
Utada, who was under their birth name Hikaru Utada in the Japanese market, is one of the most successful musicians inside of Japan. Utada had previously released three Japanese-language studio albums; First Love, Distance and Deep River. All three studio albums achieved massive success inside of Japan, all listed as one of the biggest selling albums in Japan with the debut release being the most successful Japanese album of all time, selling seven million units in Japan and an additional three million worldwide. Several singles from each album sold over one million units and tallied up to seven of their singles having sold over one million units, with their debut single "Automatic/Time Will Tell" selling over two million.

In 2001, Utada was approached by American label Island Def Jam to record a track titled "Blow My Whistle" with American rapper Foxy Brown for the American film Rush Hour 2. The track was written by Utada alongside Pharrell Williams and Chad Hugo. The song is included on Def Jam's Rush Hour 2 soundtrack, which peaked at the 11th spot on both the Billboard 200 and the Top R&B/Hip-Hop Albums, also hitting number 1 on the Top Soundtracks chart. "Blow My Whistle" was produced by the Neptunes.

Then, in 2003, Island CEO Lyon Cohen was interested in signing Utada to his label and they eventually accepted his recommendation and signed their first deal in 2004. Utada had flown to Los Angeles to meet Cohen and Universal Music Group CEO Doug Morris with their mother Keiko Fuji and father Teruzane Utada to support them. Their record label Toshiba-EMI had also released their material worldwide like Island, but Cohen commented that Island would support their choices throughout the American audience. According to Steve McClure from Billboard, Utada and their father were originally approached by EMI Music and Virgin Records beforehand and were also interested in signing Utada to their label. A source from the article commented; "People at [Virgin] were kissing up to her dad and promising him that they were definitely going to launch her internationally." However, he later commented "But with the complete meltdown [...] Everybody the Utadas knew is gone," noting the discontinuity in the label's support for them.

== Composition ==
=== Music and style ===
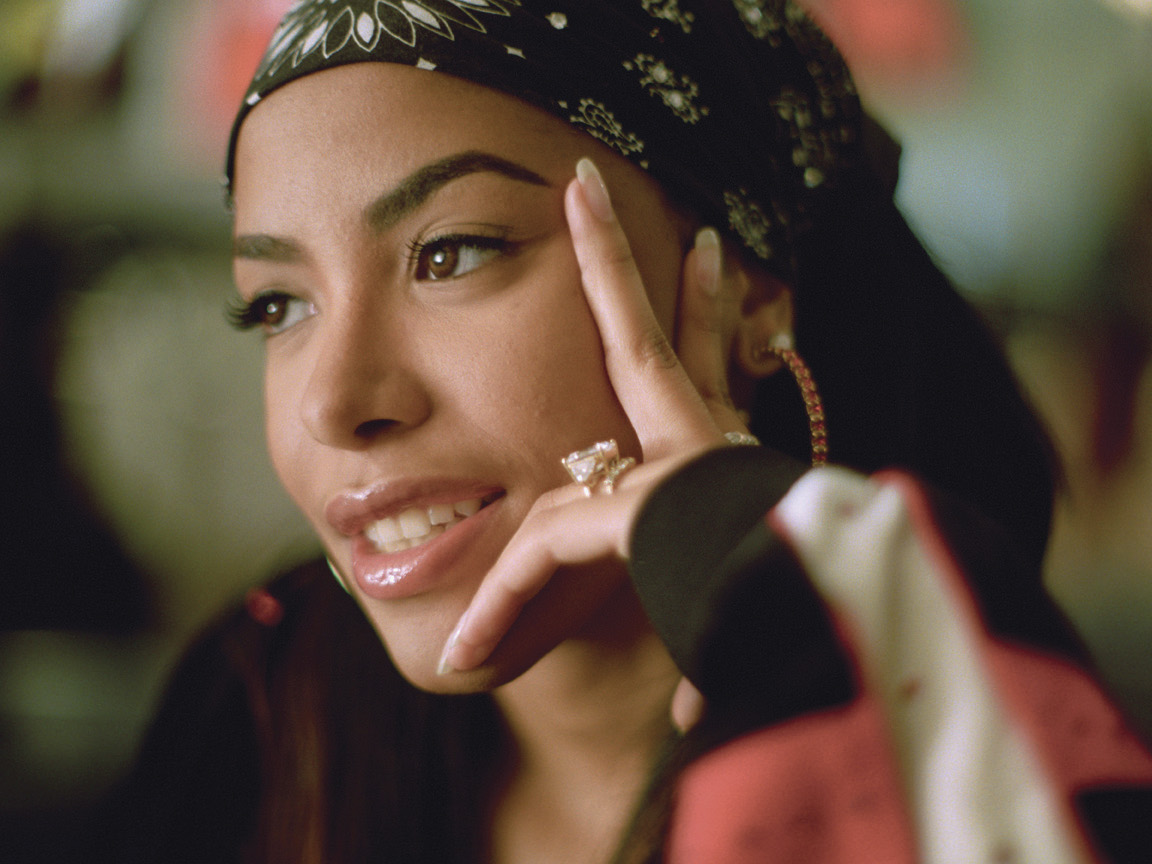
Tracks from Exodus were heavily compared to American recording artist Aaliyah (pictured).

Musically, Exodus is a dance-oriented album that incorporates several electronic genres. The album was co-produced by Utada. Utada made the majority of the album alone, saying they 'locked themselves away'. During an interview in the United States while promoting This Is the One in 2009, when asked about Exodus, Utada said that Exodus was "a very experimental album. I was like a mad scientist working away in an underground laboratory", going on to say "I had the time of my life but it was a very intense, introverted process". In the review by AllMusic, they commented on the music, stating Exodus "delivers a diverse collection of urbane, modern, and, at times, almost avant-garde electronica and dance music [...] A true fusion of Western and Eastern music's edgier elements thrown together in an after-hours disco melting pot."

The majority of the album deals with dance music and traditional J-pop. "Devil Inside" incorporates several electronic dance genres including progressive house and dark pop. The song features drum machines and synthesizers and Rob Carolan from Stylus Magazine compared it to Super Mario games during their intro sequences. Carolan had originally labelled the album's musical composition as "strange" and exemplified "Hotel Lobby" as an example for incorporating J-pop. "The Workout" was compared to Gwen Stefani's 2005 track "Hollaback Girl" for its instrumentation of colossal drums and horn parts but was often criticized for being "darker" and "demented." The Timbaland co-written single "Exodus 04" takes homage towards the album title and was compared to the composition by American rapper and singer Aaliyah, with instrumentation of string samples and piano, while "Let Me Give You My Love" incorporates more fast forward "future funk music" that was also compared to Aaliyah.

Exodus was noted by several critics for its experimentation of genres. "Kremlin Dusk" features a dark "bizarre neo-industrial symphony" that also references American poet Edgar Allan Poe's story The Raven with the lyric ("In the words of Mr. Edgar Allan Poe/Now I'm sober and nevermore/Will the Raven come to bother me at home.") "Animato" includes several electronic instrumentation's including synthesizers and keyboards to create an "alien-like" sound and composition. Throughout the track, "it synthesized mournful choirs and oppressive alien electronics, pushes pop to its most avant garde extremes."

=== Lyrical content ===
Like the rest of their previous studio albums, Utada had written the entire album. In a press conference of their record label signing, Utada stated that they had written all the songs, including Japanese tracks, in English; "Most of my lyrics come out in English, which I then rewrite in Japanese [...] so this project will save a little bit of time in songwriting, which I'll be needing, to give the best of both [Hikaru Utada] and [Utada Hikaru.]"

The introduction track and interlude titled "Opening" and "Crossover Interlude" incorporate the same lyrics in different composition. The tracks feature the lyric ("I don't wanna cross over between this genre, that genre,") which talks about the different composition of each track and also incorporates their interpretation of Western crossover to J-pop. On their single "Easy Breezy", the song talks about a past relationship with a man. In the lyrics, they mock their Asian-American heritage that was often noted as "dumb" or "silly" which they specify; ("You're easy breezy / And I'm Japaneezy").

In the song "Animato", the track references several music genres including dance, hip-hop and pop; it also comments about a woman having an extra-marital affair.

== Release and promotion ==
After Utada signed to the record label in 2002, Cohen and Morris had high hopes in releasing Exodus during the end of 2002 or early 2003 in North America, with a release date already being confirmed. However, after Utada had promoted their third Japanese studio album Deep River, they underwent surgery after being diagnosed with a benign ovarian tumor, causing Utada to put their promotional activities on hold and the release of Exodus to be delayed. They were still persistent in a 2002 release, but Utada had announced their marriage to director Kazuaki Kiriya and then delayed the studio album release.

Then, Billboard announced the release of Exodus in Spring 2004. Utada told Billboard about Asian artists making it into the Western market; "Maybe the fruit has always been ripe, but so far, Asian artists who reached for it were a few inches short." The album was released on September 8, 2004, by Island Records in Japan, and worldwide on October 5, 2004. The album was re-released by Mercury Records in the UK over a year later on September 25, 2005. This is Utada's debut English language studio album (not including Precious). Exodus was released in North America nearly a month after its release in Japan, on October 5, 2004, two months later in Brazil, on November 17, 2004, and the UK version was released about a year after on September 26, 2005. Exodus was re-released on September 20, 2006, in Japan, under Universal International, parent company of Island Def Jam.

On February 23, 2005, Utada did a one-night-only showcase at the Skylight Studios, New York. There they sang a few songs from Exodus, including "You Make Me Want to Be a Man" and "Kremlin Dusk".

In an interview, Elton John stated that:

In terms of surprises, there's an interesting girl, Utada, who's a pop star in Japan and who released an album late last year called Exodus [Island]. It's really interesting dance and pop music. She could be the first Japanese recording artist to really make it in the West.

In April 2026, Universal Music Japan announced a remastered version of Exodus, scheduled for release on June 24, 2026.

== Critical reception ==
Professional ratings
Review scores
Source	Rating
About.com	4/5 stars
AllMusic	3/5 stars
AnimeFringe	3.5/5 stars
MSN Music	3/5 stars
Stylus Magazine	B
USA Today	3/4 stars

Exodus received generally favorable reviews from most music critics. AllMusic gave three out of five stars, highlighting the two first tracks from the album and "Exodus 04", stating that Exodus "Delivers a diverse collection of urbane, modern, and, at times, almost avant-garde electronica and dance music", and concluding with "Exodus heralds the American arrival of an unusual and challenging artist." Rob Carolan from Stylus Magazine gave it a positive review, stating "So there you have it. It's not a pop masterpiece but it's a decidedly good record. Few J-Pop artists ever attempt to make such a bold and risky record, but with Exodus, Utada has established herself as an individual who can proudly stand aside from the rest of the identikit J-Pop idols. Hopefully she'll keep on getting better, but even if she falls into the machine, she will always have Exodus, and that's enough." Isaac McCalla from Dancemusic on About.com gave it a positive review, complimenting the album's process, calling some songs "radio-friendly" and then the rest more "chilled-out". He later concluded saying "[...] Utada is definitely an up and comer; she's beautiful, writes good songs with intelligent lyrics, and has a keen electronic sensibility."

Elysa Gardner from USA Today gave it three stars out of four. She said "Utada Hikaru crafts slick, electronically fueled tracks that could, on their surface, pass as background music for nightclubs and loft parties. Luckily, this young singer/songwriter is more than a ghost in her own machine." She compared Utada to an early stage of Madonna, saying that they are a "girlish yearning that transcends her vocal limitations and melts the cool sheen of her arrangements." JPop-Go gave the album a positive review saying "This is Utada's 'Exodus' from overly-polished, commercial pop; her two fingers up at the music industry. Existing fans with more eclectic tastes will be pleasantly surprised, while hardcore J-pop junkies might be disappointed at the changes."

== Commercial performance ==
Exodus is the largest debut selling foreign language album in Japanese history (debut with 523,761 units). It is the 247th best selling album of all time in Japan. On September 8, 2004, Universal Music Japan shipped 1 million copies of the album, breaking a record that was previously held by Mariah Carey (she had sold 500,000). However, the album did not achieve a lot of success in the US, reaching number 160 on the US Billboard 200 chart, and has sold in excess of 55,000 units in the territory according to Nielsen SoundScan. The album did however have success on the US Top Heatseekers albums chart, peaking at number five, making Utada's first album to debut on both charts.

== Singles ==
"Easy Breezy" was released as the first single of the album. This is the first single to debut the name "Utada" which they previously used for English releases. The song received generally positive reviews from music critics, however the song did not chart on any singles chart. The song however sold more than 2000 copies in Japan. The second single of the album, "Devil Inside", was released on September 14, 2004, and received generally mixed reviews from music critics. The song was released physically in the United States. No music video was produced. The song remained Utada's biggest hit in the United States, as it peaked at number one on the Hot Dance Club Play chart.

The third single "Exodus '04" received generally positive reviews from music critics, and was released in 2005, a late release on the album. No music video was produced for the single. The song received little attention yet again, but did peak at number twenty-four on the Hot Dance Club Play. The fourth and last single, "You Make Me Want to Be a Man", was released as the only UK single. The song received little success as well, but peaked at number 227 on the UK Singles Chart.

== Track listing ==
All tracks are written by Utada, except where noted.

Exodus – US and international edition
No.	Title	Length
1.	"Opening"	1:50
2.	"Devil Inside"	3:58
3.	"Exodus '04" (Utada, Timbaland)	4:32
4.	"The Workout"	4:01
5.	"Easy Breezy"	4:03
6.	"Tippy Toe"	4:15
7.	"Hotel Lobby"	4:30
8.	"Animato"	4:31
9.	"Crossover Interlude"	1:18
10.	"Kremlin Dusk"	5:14
11.	"You Make Me Want to Be a Man"	4:37
12.	"Wonder 'Bout"	3:48
13.	"Let Me Give You My Love" (Utada, Timbaland)	3:38
14.	"About Me"	4:00
Total length:		54:15

Exodus – UK edition bonus tracks
No.	Title	Length
15.	"You Make Me Want to Be a Man" (Bloodshy & Avant Mix)	4:03
16.	"You Make Me Want to Be a Man" (Junior Jack Mix)	6:44
Total length:		64:02

== Personnel ==
- Hikaru Utada – vocals, writer, producer, programmer, acoustic guitar
- Teruzane Utada/Skingg U – producer, guitar
- T. Moseley / Timbaland – producer, writer, remixer
- Goh Hotoda – recording, mixer
- Mat Snedecor – engineer
- Dan Bucchi – engineer
- Brian Russel – engineer
- Pat Woodward – engineer
- Jason Dale – engineer
- Patrick Magee – engineer
- Pete Davis – programmer
- Steve Sidelnyk – programmer
- Bill Pettaway – production coordinator
- Michael Evans – production coordinator
- Yuko Honda – production coordinator
- Jeff Golub – guitar
- Jon Theodore – drums
- Bryan G. Russell – saxophone

== Charts and sales ==
=== Daily and weekly charts ===
Chart (2004)	Peak position
Japanese Daily Albums (Oricon)	1
Japanese Weekly Albums (Oricon)	1
US Billboard 200	160
US Top Heatseekers (Billboard)	5

=== Yearly charts ===
Chart (2004)	Position
Japanese Albums (Oricon)	6

=== Sales ===
Region	Certification	Certified units/sales
Japan (RIAJ)	Million	1,041,878
United States (Billboard)	—	55,000

== Release history ==
Release dates and formats for Exodus
Region	Date	Format	Version	Label	Ref.
Various	2004	Digital download; streaming	Standard	Island	
Japan	September 8, 2004	CD	Japan	Island	
United States	October 5, 2004	CD	Standard	Island	
Brazil	October 5, 2004	CD	Standard	Island	
United Kingdom	September 26, 2005	CD	UK	Mercury	
Various	June 24, 2026	Digital download; streaming	Deluxe	Island; Universal International	
Various	June 24, 2026	CD	Deluxe	Island; Universal International	
Various	June 24, 2026	LP	Limited	Island; Universal International	
Various	June 24, 2026	LP	Universal Music Store limited	Island; Universal International	
