= Music of Kingdom Hearts =

Compilation album

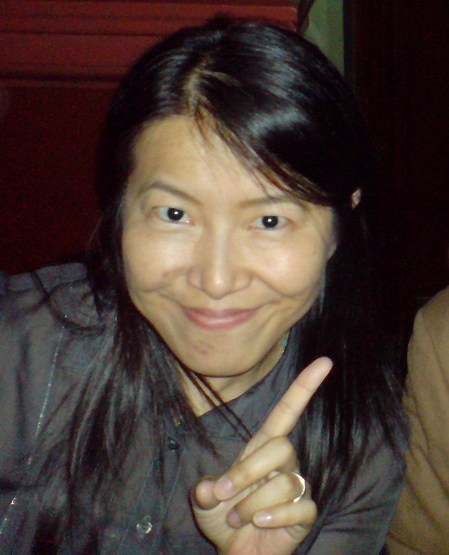
Yoko Shimomura composed and arranged the series' music, which consists of arranged Disney songs and original works by Shimomura.

The music of the Kingdom Hearts video game series was composed by Yoko Shimomura with orchestral music arranged by Kaoru Wada. The original soundtracks of the games have been released on three albums and a fourth compilation album. The soundtracks to the Kingdom Hearts games feature several musical pieces from both Square Enix and Disney works, including such pieces as "Mickey Mouse Club March" by Jimmie Dodd, "This Is Halloween" by Danny Elfman, and "One-Winged Angel" by Nobuo Uematsu. They also feature several vocal songs, the most notable being the four main theme songs: "Hikari", "Passion", "Chikai", and "Face My Fears." The two themes were written and performed by Japanese American pop star Hikaru Utada; in addition to Japanese, English versions of the first three songs were produced, titled "Simple and Clean", "Sanctuary", and "Don't Think Twice", respectively.

Although the majority of the music has been released only in Japan, the first soundtrack was released worldwide and tracks from the Kingdom Hearts series have been featured in Video Games Live at multiple venues. The music has overall been well received and several tracks have received particular praise. The two main themes were well received by both video game and music critics, and did well on Japan's Oricon Weekly Singles chart.

== Musical pieces ==
Music Samples:
Dearly Beloved
7 second sample from Yoko Shimomura's "Dearly Beloved", a short, slow piano piece.

Passion ~after the battle~
30 second sample from Hikaru Utada's "Passion ~after the battle~", the Japanese ending credits theme of Kingdom Hearts II.

The Kingdom Hearts games feature music that ranges from dark to cheerful to sorrowful. Several musical pieces are included that have either met with a positive reception or were already well known – mostly from Disney films. Such pieces include "Mickey Mouse Club March" by Jimmie Dodd; "Winnie the Pooh" by Robert B. Sherman and Richard M. Sherman; "This Is Halloween" by Danny Elfman; "He's a Pirate" by Geoff Zanelli, Klaus Badelt, and Hans Zimmer; and "Beauty and the Beast" by Howard Ashman and Alan Menken. Other well-known tracks include "Night on Bald Mountain" (rendered "A Night on the Bare Mountain") by Modest Mussorgsky, and a remixed version of "One-Winged Angel" by Final Fantasy series composer Nobuo Uematsu. Some Disney worlds in Kingdom Hearts feature corresponding music from their related Disney film. Original tracks include the title screen track, "Dearly Beloved", and the two theme songs, "Simple and Clean" and "Sanctuary". The soundtracks feature a mix of piano and orchestral pieces. The main themes differ from the other music in that they are pop songs. The series also features several vocal songs—the most notable being the two theme songs. Kingdom Hearts II includes more vocal songs in the Atlantica world, which is themed after The Little Mermaid and features rhythm-based minigames. Such vocal songs include "Part of Your World" and "Under the Sea", both by Alan Menken and Howard Ashman.

=== "Hikari" and "Simple and Clean" ===
"Hikari" (光; lit. "light") is the theme song to the Japanese release of Kingdom Hearts, the first game in the series as well as the Game Boy Advance sequel Kingdom Hearts: Chain of Memories and its remake Re:Chain of Memories, the PlayStation Portable prequel Kingdom Hearts Birth by Sleep, as well as the theme to Kingdom Hearts coded and its DS remake Re:Coded. Its English counterpart, "Simple and Clean", is the theme song to the English release of the games as well as the Japanese re-release of the first game, Kingdom Hearts Final Mix. Both songs were written and performed by Hikaru Utada. This marked the first time they had produced a song for a video game. Although the two songs share a similar melody and background music, the meaning of the songs' lyrics differ as "Simple and Clean" is not a literal translation of "Hikari". The single, "Hikari", was released in Japan on March 20, 2002 and proved to be very popular; it sold over 270,000 copies in a week. "Simple And Clean" (full version and PLANITb Remix) is included on Utada's single release of "Colors", which debuted on Japan's Oricon charts at number one and stayed on the charts for 19 weeks. It was later included as a bonus track on Utada's 2009 English-language album This Is the One. Both songs have a "PLANITb remix", which are house versions, and "Hikari" has a "Godson Mix". The different versions are used at various points in the game; the "Short Edit" version of the PLANITb remix is used for the opening sequence and the full version of the original song is used for the ending sequence.

=== "Passion" and "Sanctuary" ===
"Passion" is the theme song for the Japanese release of Kingdom Hearts II and Kingdom Hearts 358/2 Days. Its English counterpart, "Sanctuary", is the theme song for the English versions and Kingdom Hearts II Final Mix. Like the first theme, Hikaru Utada wrote and performed both the Japanese and English versions, and there are two mixes. The "~opening version~" mix is played during the opening movies, and the "~after the battle~" version is played after defeating the final boss of the games. "Sanctuary" and "~after the battle~" were both used in Kingdom Hearts 358/2 Days for DS. "Passion" was included in the Kingdom Hearts II Original Soundtrack and a CD single was released on December 14, 2005. "Sanctuary" was first previewed on MTV.com in early 2006. Both the "Opening" and "After the Battle" versions of "Sanctuary" were released in May 2009 as bonus tracks on Utada's second American album, This Is the One. The "After the Battle" versions of "Passion" and "Sanctuary" serve as the ending theme songs for the 3DS game Kingdom Hearts 3D: Dream Drop Distance.

== Creation and influence ==
Yoko Shimomura composed the music for the three main Kingdom Hearts games and their remakes. She began composing video game music in 1988, and joined Square in 1993, but left in 2002 to work freelance. In creating music, Shimomura gathers inspiration from different things outside of her daily routine, like traveling or when she is emotionally moved. She has a respect for solo and orchestral pieces, such as Piano Sonata No. 7 by Ludwig van Beethoven, Ballade No. 1 by Frédéric Chopin, and La Valse by Maurice Ravel. Shimomura was initially hesitant to handle the music for the first Kingdom Hearts; the mix of a Square-style story and Disney characters made it hard to imagine what the game would be like, which made it difficult to compose the music. Many of the musical pieces are arrangements of Disney themes, which Shimomura stated she enjoyed arranging. Shimomura felt a great deal of pressure working on such recognizable tunes, and made an effort to maintain the original mood and atmosphere of them while complying with the technical specifications of the PlayStation 2. For example, the original orchestrated arrangement of the song "This Is Halloween" from The Nightmare Before Christmas was impossible to reproduce on the PlayStation 2's sound system. To keep aspects of it intact, Shimomura used a trial and error method to arrange the piece.

In creating original music, Shimomura wanted to create compositions that would make players feel good while playing to accompany the action aspect of Kingdom Hearts. She played the game and looked over scripts and illustrations for inspiration. After coming up with ideas, she discussed them with director Tetsuya Nomura and the game planners. For the PlayStation 2 re-release of Kingdom Hearts: Chain of Memories, she and her team spent much of their time working on the fight music; Shimomura wanted the different fight music to reflect different emotions such as happiness and sadness. To handle the large workload for Kingdom Hearts coded, Kingdom Hearts 358/2 Days, and Kingdom Hearts Birth by Sleep, Shimomura composed the most prominent themes, while the rest was created by other composers. In retrospect, Shimomura has stated that the Kingdom Hearts series combined the scenes and music well, and she felt very honored her music has entered into people's hearts. She has also commented that she enjoyed working on the project, despite its hardships, and is proud of the work.

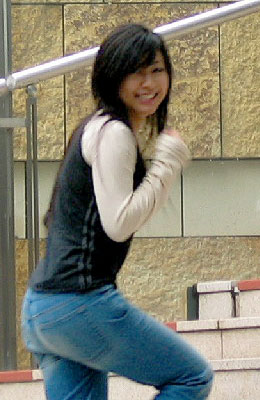
Pop singer Hikaru Utada was the only singer director Tetsuya Nomura had in mind for the series' vocal theme songs.

The two main theme songs were written and performed by Japanese American artist Hikaru Utada. They wrote two versions for each, one in Japanese and one in English; the latter is used for international releases of the games. "Hikari" and "Passion" are the Japanese version theme songs for Kingdom Hearts and Kingdom Hearts II respectively, while their English counterparts are called "Simple and Clean" and "Sanctuary". Utada was the only singer Nomura had in mind for the first Kingdom Hearts theme song. He considered Utada an iconic young singer whose music could break language and international barriers. Their involvement, along with the first song's Japanese title, was announced in January 2002. Utada's involvement with the sequel was announced in July 2005. Nomura chose not to have a different singer perform the second theme song because he believed fans associated Utada with Kingdom Hearts. Utada derived their inspiration from the worlds and characters in Kingdom Hearts; they also received written explanations of the stories from Nomura. Nomura stated that the vocals of the second theme tie in more closely with the game's story than "Hikari"/"Simple and Clean" did with Kingdom Hearts and Kingdom Hearts: Chain of Memories. Conversely, Nomura commented that Utada's theme songs influenced several factors in creating the games.

== Releases ==
Aside from being featured in the Kingdom Hearts video games, the music has been released via a variety of methods. Soundtracks for the first and third game were released shortly after the games' release. These were followed by a compilation set which featured unreleased tracks from the series, as well as new and rearranged versions of tracks from the re-released versions of the games. The first soundtrack was released in Japan, United States and Europe. All other albums were released only in Japan. Though the two main themes were released as part of the game soundtracks, they were officially released as singles a week prior to the games' releases. Utada's 2009 album This Is the One features the theme songs "Simple And Clean" and "Sanctuary". Tracks from Kingdom Hearts series have also been played by Play! A Video Game Symphony at various venues in the United States and around the world. Arnie Roth arranged Kingdom Hearts pieces for the Symphonic Fantasies concerts in September 2009. Music from Kingdom Hearts is included in Yoko Shimomura's best works compilation album Drammatica.

=== Kingdom Hearts Original Soundtrack ===
Kingdom Hearts Original Soundtrack

Soundtrack album by Yoko Shimomura
- Released: March 27, 2002
- Genre: video game soundtrack
- Length: 2:40:16
- Label: Toshiba-EMI / Virgin Records / Walt Disney Records
- Producer: Yoko Shimomura

Kingdom Hearts Original Soundtrack is the official soundtrack for the video game Kingdom Hearts. It was first released in Japan on March 27, 2002 by Toshiba-EMI, and later released in Europe on November 25, 2002 by Virgin Records and the United States on March 23, 2003 by Walt Disney Records. The soundtrack is a 2-CD set which contains most of music in the original version of the game along with two bonus tracks. The music was composed by Yoko Shimomura, with vocals done by Hikaru Utada for "Simple and Clean" and "Hikari". The orchestral music was arranged by Kaoru Wada and performed by the New Japan Philharmonic Orchestra. Because Kingdom Hearts Final Mix was released after the soundtrack, additional tracks from it were not included.

The soundtrack has met with an overall positive reception. IGN listed the opening track for Kingdom Hearts, "Dearly Beloved", as number four on their top ten list of RPG title tracks. In their "Best of 2002" awards, Kingdom Hearts was nominated for the "Best Sound in a PlayStation 2 Game Editor's Choice Award" and was a runner up for "Best Sound in Game 2002 Reader's Choice Award". Allmusic rated the first soundtrack a 3 out of 5. GameSpy described the soundtrack as "pleasant, melodious, and most of all fitting for the various situations in which it plays" and complimented the English translation of "Simple And Clean".

Track listing

Disc 1
No.	Title	Length
1.	"Dearly Beloved"	1:13
2.	"Hikari -KINGDOM Orchestra Instrumental Version-" (光; music by Hikaru Utada, arranged by Kaoru Wada)	3:42
3.	"Hikari -PLANITb Remix- (Short Edit)" (光; written and performed by Hikaru Utada)	2:31
4.	"Dive into the Heart -Destati-" ("Awaken")	4:57
5.	"Destiny Islands"	1:49
6.	"Bustin' Up on the Beach"	2:01
7.	"Mickey Mouse Club March" (music by Jimmie Dodd)	1:02
8.	"Treasured Memories"	1:45
9.	"Strange Whispers"	0:55
10.	"Kairi I"	1:19
11.	"It Began with a Letter"	1:32
12.	"A Walk in Andante"	1:18
13.	"Night of Fate"	2:06
14.	"Destiny's Force"	2:50
15.	"Where Is This?"	1:42
16.	"Traverse Town"	1:21
17.	"The Heartless Has Come"	0:55
18.	"Shrouding Dark Cloud"	2:15
19.	"Blast Away! -Gummi Ship I-"	1:50
20.	"Tricksy Clock"	0:38
21.	"Welcome to Wonderland"	1:53
22.	"To Our Surprise"	2:14
23.	"Turning the Key"	0:16
24.	"Olympus Coliseum"	2:08
25.	"Road to a Hero"	1:30
26.	"Go for It!"	2:05
27.	"No Time to Think"	0:33
28.	"Deep Jungle"	3:00
29.	"Having a Wild Time"	2:25
30.	"Holy Bananas!"	2:16
31.	"Squirming Evil"	1:54
32.	"Hand in Hand"	2:26
33.	"Kairi II"	1:02
34.	"Merlin's Magical House"	1:46
35.	"Winnie the Pooh" (music by Richard M. Sherman and Robert B. Sherman)	2:28
36.	"Bounce-O-Rama"	1:48
37.	"Just an Itty Bitty Too Much"	0:40
38.	"Once Upon a Time"	0:21
39.	"Shipmeisters' Humoresque"	2:11
40.	"Precious Stars in the Sky"	1:08
41.	"Blast Away! -Gummi Ship II-"	1:51
Total length:		1:13:54

Disc 2
No.	Title	Length
1.	"A Day in Agrabah"	2:23
2.	"Arabian Dream"	2:04
3.	"Villains of a Sort"	1:32
4.	"A Very Small Wish"	2:16
5.	"Monstrous Monstro"	1:56
6.	"Friends in My Heart"	1:30
7.	"Under the Sea" (music by Alan Menken and Howard Ashman)	1:54
8.	"An Adventure in Atlantica"	2:03
9.	"A Piece of Peace"	1:00
10.	"An Intense Situation"	0:48
11.	"The Deep End"	2:14
12.	"This Is Halloween" (music by Danny Elfman)	2:22
13.	"Spooks of Halloween Town"	2:14
14.	"Oopsy-Daisy"	0:21
15.	"Captain Hook's Pirate Ship"	2:06
16.	"Pirate's Gigue"	1:45
17.	"Never Land Sky"	1:26
18.	"Kairi III"	1:35
19.	"Blast Away! -Gummi Ship III-"	1:51
20.	"Hollow Bastion"	2:26
21.	"Scherzo di notte" ("Scherzo at Night")	1:49
22.	"Forze del male" ("Forces of Evil")	3:38
23.	"HIKARI -KINGDOM HEARTS Instrumental Version-" (music by Hikaru Utada)	1:10
24.	"Miracle"	0:16
25.	"End of the World"	3:14
26.	"Fragments of Sorrow"	2:18
27.	"Guardando nel Buio" ("Peering into the Dark")	4:25
28.	"Beyond the Door"	1:08
29.	"Always on My Mind"	1:47
30.	"Hikari" (光; written and performed by Hikaru Utada)	5:03
31.	"March Caprice for Piano and Orchestra" (arranged by Kaoru Wada)	5:13
32.	"Hand in Hand -Reprise-" (arranged by Takahito Eguchi)	0:55
33.	"Dearly Beloved -Reprise-"	1:20
34.	"Having a Wild Time -Previous Version-" (bonus track)	1:11
35.	"Destati" ("Awaken"; bonus track)	2:55
Total length:		2:26:19

=== Kingdom Hearts Final Mix Additional Tracks ===
Kingdom Hearts Final Mix Additional Tracks

EP by Yoko Shimomura
- Released: December 26, 2002 (Japan)
- Genre: Video game soundtrack
- Length: 14:34
- Label: Walt Disney

Kingdom Hearts Final Mix Additional Tracks is a separate CD that features new tracks from the re-release of the first game, Kingdom Hearts Final Mix. It was released in Japan on December 26, 2002, by Walt Disney Records.

Track listing
No.	Title	Length
1.	"One-Winged Angel (from FINAL FANTASY VII)" (music by Nobuo Uematsu)	3:52
2.	"A Night on Bald Mountain" (music by Modest Mussorgsky)	4:07
3.	"Disappeared"	3:56
4.	"Another Side"	2:39
Total length:		14:34

=== Kingdom Hearts II Original Soundtrack ===
Kingdom Hearts II Original Soundtrack

Soundtrack album by Yoko Shimomura
- Released: January 25, 2006 (Japan)
- Recorded: Tokyo Opera City Concert Hall
- Genre: Video game soundtrack
- Length: 2:28:47
- Label: Toshiba EMI
- Producer: Yoko Shimomura

Kingdom Hearts II Original Soundtrack is the official soundtrack for Kingdom Hearts II video game. The album contains musical tracks from the game, composed and produced by Yoko Shimomura, with the main orchestral tracks arranged by Kaoru Wada and performed by the Tokyo Philharmonic Orchestra. Vocals were performed by Hikaru Utada for the theme song, "Passion". The soundtrack was released in Japan on January 25, 2006.

The soundtrack received positive remarks from critics. G4TV awarded Kingdom Hearts II "Best Soundtrack" at their 2006 G-Phoria awards show. GameSpy complimented the soundtrack but stated it was not as good as the first game's soundtrack. Game Informer called the musical score "unforgettable". GameSpot stated the "superb soundtrack" further enhanced the gaming experience and rated the sound a 9 out of 10.

Track listing

Disc 1
No.	Title	Length
1.	"Dearly Beloved"	2:22
2.	"Passion -KINGDOM Orchestra Instrumental Version-" (music by Hikaru Utada, arranged by Kaoru Wada)	3:41
3.	"Passion ~opening version~" (written and performed by Hikaru Utada)	4:26
4.	"Lazy Afternoons"	1:40
5.	"Sinister Sundown"	1:14
6.	"The Escapade"	1:17
7.	"Dive into the Heart -Destati-" ("Awaken")	1:49
8.	"Fragments of Sorrow"	1:16
9.	"Tension Rising"	1:34
10.	"Kairi"	0:54
11.	"Missing You"	1:53
12.	"The 13th Struggle"	1:44
13.	"Roxas"	1:18
14.	"Sora"	1:29
15.	"The Afternoon Streets"	1:36
16.	"Working Together"	1:30
17.	"Friends in My Heart"	1:01
18.	"Magical Mystery"	0:52
19.	"A Twinkle in the Sky"	0:57
20.	"Reviving Hollow Bastion"	2:08
21.	"Scherzo di Notte" ("Scherzo at Night")	1:19
22.	"Laughter and Merriment"	1:06
23.	"Desire for All That Is Lost"	1:26
24.	"Organization XIII"	1:22
25.	"Gearing Up"	0:58
26.	"Shipmeisters' Shanty"	2:00
27.	"Blast Off!"	0:39
28.	"Asteroid Attack"	1:16
29.	"Crossing the Finish Line"	0:41
30.	"Waltz of the Damned"	1:07
31.	"Dance of the Daring"	1:04
32.	"Hesitation"	1:10
33.	"Dance to the Death"	1:47
34.	"Beauty and the Beast" (music by Alan Menken and Howard Ashman)	0:46
35.	"The Home of Dragons"	1:32
36.	"Fields of Honor"	1:16
37.	"Apprehension"	1:17
38.	"Vim and Vigor"	1:28
39.	"Cloudchasers"	1:39
40.	"Olympus Coliseum"	1:39
41.	"The Underworld"	1:23
42.	"What Lies Beneath"	1:29
43.	"Villains of a Sort"	0:53
44.	"Rowdy Rumble"	1:32
45.	"Mickey Mouse Club March" (music by Jimmie Dodd)	1:15
46.	"A Walk in Andante"	0:55
47.	"Monochrome Dreams"	1:04
48.	"Old Friends, Old Rivals"	0:56
49.	"Floating In Bliss"	1:31
50.	"Winnie the Pooh" (music by Richard M. Sherman and Robert B. Sherman)	1:38
51.	"Bounce-O-Rama (Speed Up Version)"	1:39
Total length:		1:14:28

Disc 2
No.	Title	Length
1.	"Isn't It Lovely?"	1:42
2.	"Let's Sing and Dance!"	0:30
3.	"Swim This Way"	2:21
4.	"Part of Your World" (music by Alan Menken, lyrics by Howard Ashman)	1:47
5.	"Under the Sea" (music by Alan Menken, lyrics by Howard Ashman)	2:05
6.	"Ursula's Revenge"	2:15
7.	"A New Day Is Dawning"	2:09
8.	"Nights of the Cursed"	1:56
9.	"He's a Pirate" (music by Klaus Badelt, Geoff Zanelli, and Hans Zimmer)	1:29
10.	"The Corrupted"	1:21
11.	"Hazardous Highway"	1:12
12.	"A Day in Agrabah"	1:51
13.	"Arabian Dream"	1:35
14.	"This Is Halloween" (music by Danny Elfman)	1:26
15.	"Spooks of Halloween Town"	1:20
16.	"Adventures in the Savannah"	1:49
17.	"Savannah Pride"	1:20
18.	"The Encounter"	1:49
19.	"Space Paranoids"	1:42
20.	"Byte Bashing"	1:20
21.	"Sinister Shadows"	1:12
22.	"The 13th Dilemma"	1:59
23.	"Showdown at Hollow Bastion"	0:48
24.	"One-Winged Angel (from FINAL FANTASY VII)" (music by Nobuo Uematsu)	2:12
25.	"Battleship Bravery"	1:42
26.	"Sacred Moon"	2:06
27.	"Deep Dive"	1:38
28.	"Riku"	1:16
29.	"Courage"	0:53
30.	"Disappeared"	2:22
31.	"A Fight to the Death"	2:04
32.	"Darkness of the Unknown"	4:36
33.	"Passion ~after the battle~" (written and performed by Hikaru Utada)	5:59
34.	"Fantasia alla Marcia for piano, chorus, and orchestra" ("Fantasia on the March"; arranged by Kaoru Wada)	7:45
35.	"Destiny Islands"	1:10
36.	"Hand in Hand"	0:40
37.	"Sunset Horizons"	1:30
38.	"Dearly Beloved -Reprise-"	1:28
Total length:		1:14:19

=== Kingdom Hearts Original Soundtrack Complete ===
Kingdom Hearts Original Soundtrack Complete

Compilation album by Yoko Shimomura
- Released: March 28, 2007 (Japan)
- Recorded: Tokyo Opera City Concert Hall
- Genre: Video game soundtrack
- Length: 8:51:33
- Label: Walt Disney
- Producer: Yoko Shimomura

Kingdom Hearts Original Soundtrack Complete is a compilation album of the video game music from the three main games in the series, Kingdom Hearts, Kingdom Hearts: Chain of Memories, and Kingdom Hearts II. The boxset contains music composed and produced by Yoko Shimomura, with the main orchestral tracks arranged by Kaoru Wada. The album also features various unreleased tracks from the series, as well as new and rearranged versions of tracks from the two Final Mix releases and Re:Chain of Memories. The compilation boxset was released in Japan on March 28, 2007.

The collection has printed images on each disc and includes a deluxe booklet containing new illustrations designed by director and character designer Tetsuya Nomura and comments from Yoko Shimomura. A special CD carrying case featuring artwork of Sora and Roxas was released as a bonus. The soundtrack comprises nine discs with 229 tracks in total. Discs one and two contain unaltered tracks from the Kingdom Hearts Original Soundtrack while discs three to six contain lengthier and looped tracks from the Kingdom Hearts II Original Soundtrack. Discs seven and eight contain tracks from Kingdom Hearts Re:Chain of Memories while disc nine contains bonus tracks from Kingdom Hearts Final Mix and Kingdom Hearts II Final Mix.

Track listing

Disc 1
No.	Title	Length
1.	"Dearly Beloved"	1:13
2.	"Hikari -KINGDOM Orchestra Instrumental Version-" (光; music by Hikaru Utada, arranged by Kaoru Wada)	3:42
3.	"Hikari -PLANITb Remix- (Short Edit)" (光; written and performed by Hikaru Utada)	2:31
4.	"Dive into the Heart -Destati-" ("Awaken")	4:57
5.	"Destiny Islands"	1:49
6.	"Bustin' Up on the Beach"	2:01
7.	"Mickey Mouse Club March" (music by Jimmie Dodd)	1:02
8.	"Treasured Memories"	1:45
9.	"Strange Whispers"	0:55
10.	"Kairi I"	1:19
11.	"It Began with a Letter"	1:32
12.	"A Walk in Andante"	1:18
13.	"Night of Fate"	2:06
14.	"Destiny's Force"	2:50
15.	"Where Is This?"	1:42
16.	"Traverse Town"	1:21
17.	"The Heartless Has Come"	0:54
18.	"Shrouding Dark Cloud"	2:15
19.	"Blast Away! -Gummi Ship I-"	1:50
20.	"Tricksy Clock"	0:38
21.	"Welcome to Wonderland"	1:53
22.	"To Our Surprise"	2:14
23.	"Turning the Key"	0:16
24.	"Olympus Coliseum"	2:08
25.	"Road to a Hero"	1:30
26.	"Go for It!"	2:05
27.	"No Time to Think"	0:33
28.	"Deep Jungle"	3:00
29.	"Having a Wild Time"	2:25
30.	"Holy Bananas!"	2:16
31.	"Squirming Evil"	1:54
32.	"Hand in Hand"	2:26
33.	"Kairi II"	1:02
34.	"Merlin's Magical House"	1:46
35.	"Winnie the Pooh" (music by Richard M. Sherman and Robert B. Sherman)	2:28
36.	"Bounce-O-Rama"	1:48
37.	"Just an Itty Bitty Too Much"	0:40
38.	"Once Upon a Time"	0:21
39.	"Shipmeisters' Humoresque"	2:11
40.	"Precious Stars in the Sky"	1:08
41.	"Blast Away! -Gummi Ship II-"	1:50
Total length:		1:14:28

Disc 2
No.	Title	Length
1.	"A Day in Agrabah"	2:23
2.	"Arabian Dream"	2:04
3.	"Villains of a Sort"	1:32
4.	"A Very Small Wish"	2:16
5.	"Monstrous Monstro"	1:56
6.	"Friends in My Heart"	1:30
7.	"Under the Sea" (music by Alan Menken and Howard Ashman)	1:54
8.	"An Adventure in Atlantica"	2:03
9.	"A Piece of Peace"	1:00
10.	"An Intense Situation"	0:48
11.	"The Deep End"	2:14
12.	"This is Halloween" (music by Danny Elfman)	2:22
13.	"Spooks of Halloween Town"	2:14
14.	"Oopsy-Daisy"	0:21
15.	"Captain Hook's Pirate Ship"	2:06
16.	"Pirate's Gigue"	1:45
17.	"Never Land Sky"	1:26
18.	"Kairi III"	1:35
19.	"Blast Away! -Gummi Ship III-"	1:51
20.	"Hollow Bastion"	2:26
21.	"Scherzo Di Notte" ("Scherzo at Night")	1:49
22.	"Forze Del Male" ("Forces of Evil")	3:38
23.	"HIKARI – KINGDOM HEARTS Instrumental Version" (music by Hikaru Utada)	1:09
24.	"Miracle"	0:16
25.	"End of the World"	3:14
26.	"Fragments of Sorrow"	2:18
27.	"Guardando nel Buio" ("Peering into the Dark")	4:24
28.	"Beyond the Door"	1:08
29.	"Always on My Mind"	1:47
30.	"Hikari" (光; written and performed by Hikaru Utada)	5:03
31.	"March Caprice for Piano and Orchestra" (arranged by Kaoru Wada)	5:13
32.	"Hand in Hand -Reprise-"	0:55
33.	"Dearly Beloved -Reprise-"	1:20
34.	"Having a Wild Time -Previous Version-" (bonus track)	1:11
35.	"Destati" ("Awaken"; bonus track)	2:55
Total length:		1:12:25

Disc 3
No.	Title	Length
1.	"Dearly Beloved"	4:18
2.	"Passion -KINGDOM Orchestra Instrumental Version-" (music by Hikaru Utada, arranged by Kaoru Wada)	3:43
3.	"Passion ~opening version~" (written and performed by Hikaru Utada)	4:25
4.	"Lazy Afternoons"	3:10
5.	"Sinister Sundown"	2:08
6.	"The Escapade"	2:03
7.	"Dive into the Heart -Destati-" ("Awaken")	2:58
8.	"Fragments of Sorrow"	2:17
9.	"Tension Rising"	2:39
10.	"Kairi"	1:27
11.	"Missing You"	3:32
12.	"The 13th Struggle"	3:12
13.	"Roxas"	2:26
14.	"Sora"	2:22
15.	"The Afternoon Streets"	2:58
16.	"Working Together"	2:32
17.	"Friends in my Heart"	1:45
18.	"Magical Mystery"	1:41
19.	"A Twinkle in the Sky"	1:31
20.	"Reviving Hollow Bastion"	3:26
21.	"Scherzo Di Notte" ("Scherzo of Night")	2:05
22.	"Laughter and Merriment"	1:54
23.	"Desire for All That Is Lost"	2:33
24.	"Organization XIII"	2:32
Total length:		1:03:51

Disc 4
No.	Title	Length
1.	"Gearing Up"	1:40
2.	"Shipmeisters' Shanty"	3:43
3.	"Blast Off!"	0:45
4.	"Asteroid Attack"	2:10
5.	"Crossing the Finish Line"	0:47
6.	"Waltz of the Damned"	2:06
7.	"Dance of the Daring"	1:52
8.	"Hesitation"	1:45
9.	"Dance to the Death"	2:48
10.	"Beauty and the Beast" (music by Alan Menken and Howard Ashman)	0:47
11.	"The Home of Dragons"	2:46
12.	"Fields of Honor"	2:18
13.	"Apprehension"	2:00
14.	"Vim and Vigor"	2:32
15.	"Cloudchasers"	2:50
16.	"Olympus Coliseum"	2:50
17.	"Road to a Hero"	1:53
18.	"The Underworld"	2:24
19.	"What Lies Beneath"	2:17
20.	"Villains of a Sort"	1:13
21.	"Beneath the Ground"	1:48
22.	"Rowdy Rumble"	2:38
23.	"Mickey Mouse Club March"	2:05
24.	"A Walk in Andante"	1:45
25.	"Monochrome Dreams"	1:48
26.	"Old Friends, Old Rivals"	1:33
27.	"Floating in Bliss"	2:25
28.	"Winnie the Pooh" (music by Richard M. Sherman and Robert B. Sherman)	2:31
29.	"Bounce-O-Rama"	1:54
30.	"Bounce-O-Rama (Speed Up Version)"	3:01
Total length:		1:03:10

Disc 5
No.	Title	Length
1.	"Isn't It Lovely?"	2:53
2.	"Let's Sing and Dance!"	0:30
3.	"Swim This Way"	2:21
4.	"Part of Your World" (music by Alan Menken, lyrics by Howard Ashman)	1:47
5.	"Under the Sea" (music by Alan Menken, lyrics by Howard Ashman)	2:06
6.	"Ursula's Revenge"	2:17
7.	"A New Day is Dawning"	2:10
8.	"Any Time Any Place"	0:18
9.	"Nights of the Cursed"	3:40
10.	"He's a Pirate" (music by Klaus Badelt, Geoff Zanelli, and Hans Zimmer)	2:38
11.	"The Corrupted"	2:11
12.	"Hazardous Highway"	2:01
13.	"A Day in Agrabah"	2:46
14.	"Arabian Dream"	2:38
15.	"Arabian Daydream"	2:32
16.	"This is Halloween" (music by Danny Elfman)	2:27
17.	"Spooks of Halloween Town"	2:16
18.	"Adventures in the Savannah"	3:02
19.	"Savannah Pride"	2:23
20.	"The Encounter"	2:55
21.	"Space Paranoids"	3:11
22.	"Byte Bashing"	2:20
23.	"Byte Striking"	2:07
24.	"Sinister Shadows"	2:03
25.	"The 13th Dilemma"	3:34
Total length:		59:22

Disc 6
No.	Title	Length
1.	"Showdown at Hollow Bastion"	0:48
2.	"One-Winged Angel (from FINAL FANTASY VII)" (music by Nobuo Uematsu)	3:47
3.	"Battleship Bravery"	1:59
4.	"Sacred Moon"	3:47
5.	"Deep Drive"	2:53
6.	"Riku"	2:11
7.	"Courage"	1:22
8.	"Disappeared"	4:01
9.	"A Fight to the Death"	3:35
10.	"Darkness of the Unknown"	7:49
11.	"Passion ~after the battle~" (written and performed by Hikaru Utada)	5:59
12.	"Fantasia alla Marcia for piano, chorus and orchestra" ("Fantasia on the March")	7:47
13.	"Destiny Islands"	1:11
14.	"Hand in Hand"	0:39
15.	"Sunset Horizons"	1:31
16.	"Dearly Beloved -Reprise-"	2:43
Total length:		(52:13)

Disc 7
No.	Title	Length
1.	"Dearly Beloved"	2:22
2.	"Memories in Pieces"	1:54
3.	"Traverse Town"	1:28
4.	"Hand in Hand"	2:41
5.	"Just Wondering"	1:14
6.	"Struggle Away"	2:15
7.	"Welcome to Wonderland"	2:05
8.	"To Our Surprise"	2:24
9.	"Piccolo Resto" ("A Little Remain")	1:20
10.	"Olympus Coliseum"	2:17
11.	"Go for It!"	2:16
12.	"Disquieting"	1:54
13.	"The Fight for My Friends"	2:57
14.	"A Day in Agrabah"	2:17
15.	"Arabian Dream"	2:13
16.	"A Very Small Wish"	2:22
17.	"Monstrous Monstro"	2:03
18.	"La Pace" ("Peace")	1:29
19.	"This is Halloween" (music by Danny Elfman)	2:32
20.	"Spooks of Halloween Town"	2:22
21.	"The 13th Floor"	1:47
22.	"Under the Sea" (music by Alan Menken and Howard Ashman)	2:06
23.	"An Adventure In Atlantica"	2:10
24.	"Face It!"	1:06
25.	"The Force in You"	2:12
Total length:		(52:02)

Disc 8
No.	Title	Length
1.	"Captain Hook's Pirate Ship"	2:16
2.	"Pirate's Gigue"	1:57
3.	"Scent of Silence"	1:57
4.	"Hollow Bastion"	2:32
5.	"Scherzo Di Notte" ("Scherzo at Night")	2:01
6.	"Revenge of Chaos"	2:17
7.	"Winnie the Pooh" (music by Richard M. Sherman and Robert B. Sherman)	2:32
8.	"March-A-Long"	2:28
9.	"Dash-A-Long"	2:19
10.	"Thirteenth Discretion"	1:12
11.	"The 13th Struggle"	2:29
12.	"Lazy Afternoons"	3:19
13.	"Sinister Sundown"	2:13
14.	"Destiny Islands"	2:40
15.	"Night of Fate"	2:31
16.	"Naminé"	2:15
17.	"Castle Oblivion"	3:23
18.	"Forgotten Challenge"	2:29
19.	"Graceful Assassin"	2:38
20.	"Scythe of Petals"	3:16
21.	"Lord of the Castle"	4:33
Total length:		53:32

Disc 9
No.	Title	Length
1.	"One-Winged Angel (from FINAL FANTASY VII)" (music by Nobuo Uematsu)	3:52
2.	"A Night on Bald Mountain" (music by Modest Mussorgsky)	4:07
3.	"Disappeared"	3:56
4.	"Another Side"	2:42
5.	"What A Surprise?!"	2:42
6.	"Happy Holidays!"	2:30
7.	"The 13th Reflection"	3:46
8.	"Cavern of Remembrance"	3:25
9.	"Deep Anxiety"	2:15
10.	"The Other Promise"	4:36
11.	"Rage Awakened"	3:44
12.	"Fate of the Unknown"	3:26
Total length:		41:08

=== Piano Collections Kingdom Hearts ===
Piano Collections Kingdom Hearts

Compilation album by Yoko Shimomura
- Released: May 27, 2009 (Japan)
- Genre: Video game soundtrack
- Length: 44:37

On May 27, 2009, Square Enix released a collection of Kingdom Hearts music arranged for the piano. The tracks are popular pieces chosen by members of Square Enix's music website. A mini concert was held on April 2, 2009 in Tokyo to preview the album, attendees of which were drawn from a lottery held on the Square Enix Members website. There, composer Yoko Shimomura described the album as consisting of easy listening piano solo arrangements. Tracks 5 through 8 are a sonata on the various themes of the series.

"The Other Promise" and "Roxas" are used for a cutscene of Kingdom Hearts Re:coded in Kingdom Hearts HD 2.5 ReMIX. The Piano Collections arrangement of "Dearly Beloved" also features in the title selection screen of Kingdom Hearts HD 1.5 ReMIX, Kingdom Hearts HD 2.5 ReMIX, Kingdom Hearts HD 2.8 Final Chapter Prologue, and Kingdom Hearts HD 1.5+2.5 ReMIX.

Track listing
No.	Title	Length
1.	"Dearly Beloved"	2:35
2.	"Traverse Town"	3:37
3.	"Hand in Hand"	2:48
4.	"Missing You ~ Naminé"	4:39
5.	"1st Mov.: Sora – Allegro con brio"	4:18
6.	"2nd Mov.: Kairi – Andante sostenuto"	3:04
7.	"3rd Mov.: Riku – Scherzo e Intermezzo"	4:27
8.	"Finale: Working Together – Allegro vivace"	3:31
9.	"The 13th Side"	4:16
10.	"Roxas"	2:36
11.	"The Other Promise"	4:40
12.	"Concert Paraphrase on "Dearly Beloved""	4:06
Total length:		44:37

=== Piano Collections Kingdom Hearts Field & Battle ===
Piano Collections Kingdom Hearts Field & Battle

Compilation album by Yoko Shimomura
- Released: January 13, 2010 (Japan)
- Genre: Video game soundtrack
- Length: 37:46

Piano Collections Kingdom Hearts Field & Battle is the second compilation album of compositions from the Kingdom Hearts series arranged for solo piano by Sachiko Miyano and Natsumi Kameoka. Unlike the first album, which features mostly character themes and background music, this compilation features themes from battles and worlds. Square Enix announced it at the 2009 Tokyo Game Show, and released it in Japan on January 13, 2010.

Track listing
No.	Title	Length
1.	"Scherzo Caprice on a Theme of Never Land"	3:49
2.	"Sinister Sundown"	3:16
3.	"Wonderland's Surprises"	4:12
4.	"Lazy Afternoons"	4:10
5.	"Night of Fate"	4:03
6.	"A Very Small Wish – Monstrous Monstro"	3:49
7.	"Hollow Bastion"	3:53
8.	"Medley of Conflict"	4:19
9.	"Musique pour la tristesse de Xion" ("Music for Xion's sadness")	5:35
Total length:		37:46

=== Kingdom Hearts Birth by Sleep & 358/2 Days Original Soundtrack ===
Kingdom Hearts Birth by Sleep & 358/2 Days Original Soundtrack

Soundtrack album by Yoko Shimomura, Takeharu Ishimoto, Tsuyoshi Sekito
- Released: February 2, 2011 (Japan)
- Genre: Video game soundtrack
- Length: 3:51:54
- Label: Walt Disney

Kingdom Hearts Birth by Sleep & 358/2 Days Original Soundtrack is a three-disc album containing music from the games Kingdom Hearts Birth by Sleep and Kingdom Hearts 358/2 Days, as well as Kingdom Hearts Re:coded. Unlike previous soundtracks, this set features a collaboration between composers Yoko Shimomura, Takeharu Ishimoto, and Tsuyoshi Sekito, containing musical compositions from all three. It was released on February 2, 2011. Discs one and two contain music from Birth by Sleep, and disc three contains music from 358/2 Days (tracks 1 through 13), Re:coded (tracks 14 through 20), and Birth by Sleep: Final Mix (tracks 21 through 27). Tracks from 358/2 Days and Re:coded are in pure orchestrated form, and are not digitized as they are in the original game releases.

Track listing

Disc 1
No.	Title	Music	Length
1.	"Dearly Beloved"	Yoko Shimomura	5:24
2.	"The Key of Light"	Yoko Shimomura	2:28
3.	"The Promised Beginning"	Yoko Shimomura	3:06
4.	"Future Masters"	Yoko Shimomura	2:29
5.	"Shaded Truths"	Takeharu Ishimoto	2:52
6.	"Tears of the Light"	Yoko Shimomura	3:19
7.	"Terra"	Yoko Shimomura	1:40
8.	"Xehanort"	Yoko Shimomura	2:10
9.	"The Worlds"	Yoko Shimomura	2:05
10.	"The Secret Whispers"	Yoko Shimomura	3:26
11.	"Risky Romp"	Yoko Shimomura	2:31
12.	"Innocent Times"	Yoko Shimomura	1:14
13.	"Drops of Poison"	Yoko Shimomura	2:27
14.	"Bibbidi-Bobbidi-Boo" (original music by Al Hoffman and Mack David)	Yoko Shimomura	2:01
15.	"Castle Escapade"	Yoko Shimomura	1:59
16.	"Peaceful Hearts"	Yoko Shimomura	1:45
17.	"Extreme Encounters"	Yoko Shimomura	2:44
18.	"Dearly Dreams"	Yoko Shimomura	3:06
19.	"Dice and Shine"	Takeharu Ishimoto	2:04
20.	"Unforgettable"	Yoko Shimomura	3:14
21.	"The Silent Forest"	Yoko Shimomura	2:48
22.	"The Rustling Forest"	Yoko Shimomura	2:12
23.	"The Tumbling"	Yoko Shimomura	3:15
24.	"Ventus"	Yoko Shimomura	3:06
25.	"Enter the Darkness"	Takeharu Ishimoto	4:44
26.	"Radiant Garden" (arranged by Tsuyoshi Sekito)	Yoko Shimomura	3:23
27.	"Black Garden" (arranged by Tsuyoshi Sekito)	Yoko Shimomura	2:19
28.	"Black Powder"	Tsuyoshi Sekito	2:43
Total length:			1:16:34

Disc 2
No.	Title	Music	Length
1.	"Eternal Moments" (arranged by Takeharu Ishimoto)	Yoko Shimomura	3:30
2.	"Mickey Mouse March" (original music by Jimmie Dodd)	Tsuyoshi Sekito	2:07
3.	"Up Down Adventure"	Yoko Shimomura	2:53
4.	"Hero or Heel?"	Tsuyoshi Sekito	1:31
5.	"It's a Small World" (original music by Richard M. Sherman and Robert B. Sherman)	Yoko Shimomura	2:24
6.	"Dessert★Paradise"	Yoko Shimomura	1:58
7.	"Fresh Fruits Balls"	Tsuyoshi Sekito	2:26
8.	"Go! Go! Rumble Racer"	Yoko Shimomura	2:33
9.	"Big Race"	Tsuyoshi Sekito	1:00
10.	"Cheers for the Brave"	Yoko Shimomura	2:17
11.	"A Date with Fate"	Takeharu Ishimoto	2:18
12.	"Hau'oli, Hau'oli" ("Happy, Happy")	Yoko Shimomura	2:38
13.	"Mkaukau?" ("Are You Ready?")	Yoko Shimomura	2:49
14.	"Daydream upon Neverland"	Yoko Shimomura	3:13
15.	"Neverland's Scherzo"	Yoko Shimomura	3:01
16.	"Keyblade Graveyard Horizon"	Yoko Shimomura	2:55
17.	"Unbreakable Chains"	Takeharu Ishimoto	5:21
18.	"The Key of Darkness"	Yoko Shimomura	2:37
19.	"Rage Awakened -The Origin-"	Yoko Shimomura	3:32
20.	"Aqua"	Yoko Shimomura	2:52
21.	"Dismiss"	Yoko Shimomura	4:38
22.	"The Key"	Yoko Shimomura	2:40
23.	"Enter the Void"	Takeharu Ishimoto	5:07
24.	"Destiny's Union"	Yoko Shimomura	2:44
25.	"Birth by Sleep -A Link to the Future-" (arranged by Kaoru Wada)	Yoko Shimomura	7:30
Total length:			1:16:34

Disc 3
No.	Title	Music	Length
1.	"Dearly Beloved"	Yoko Shimomura	2:55
2.	"Results and Rewards"	Yoko Shimomura	0:56
3.	"Mystic Moon"	Yoko Shimomura	3:40
4.	"Critical Drive"	Yoko Shimomura	2:56
5.	"Sacred Moon"	Yoko Shimomura	3:13
6.	"Musique pour la tristesse de Xion" ("Music for Xion's sadness")	Yoko Shimomura	3:59
7.	"Xemnus [sic]"	Yoko Shimomura	2:26
8.	"Secret of Neverland"	Yoko Shimomura	1:54
9.	"Crossing to Neverland"	Yoko Shimomura	2:18
10.	"At Dusk, I Will Think of You..."	Yoko Shimomura	4:00
11.	"Fight and Away"	Yoko Shimomura	2:17
12.	"Vector to the Heavens"	Yoko Shimomura	3:51
13.	"Another Side -Battle Ver.-"	Yoko Shimomura	3:02
14.	"Dearly Beloved"	Yoko Shimomura	2:57
15.	"On the Debug!!"	Yoko Shimomura	0:46
16.	"Wonder of Electron"	Yoko Shimomura	2:21
17.	"No More Bugs!!"	Yoko Shimomura	3:18
18.	"Wonder of Electron -Bug Ver.-" (arranged by Hirosato Noda)	Yoko Shimomura	2:20
19.	"No More Bugs!! -Bug Ver.-"	Yoko Shimomura	3:17
20.	"Pretty Pretty Abilities"	Yoko Shimomura	3:03
21.	"Dark Impetus"	Yoko Shimomura	4:55
22.	"Monstrous Monstro -Arena Ver.-" (arranged by Keiji Kawamori)	Yoko Shimomura	2:08
23.	"Night in the Dark Dream"	Yoko Shimomura	3:22
24.	"Night of Tragedy"	Yoko Shimomura	1:58
25.	"Hunter of the Dark"	Yoko Shimomura	2:50
26.	"Master, Tell Me the Truth"	Yoko Shimomura	3:00
27.	"Forze dell'Oscurita" ("Forces of Darkness")	Yoko Shimomura	5:04
Total length:			1:18:46

=== Kingdom Hearts Dream Drop Distance Original Soundtrack ===
Kingdom Hearts Dream Drop Distance Original Soundtrack

Soundtrack album by Yoko Shimomura, Takeharu Ishimoto, Tsuyoshi Sekito
- Released: April 18, 2012 (Japan)
- Genre: Video game soundtrack
- Length: 3:20:18
- Label: Walt Disney

Kingdom Hearts Dream Drop Distance Original Soundtrack is a three-disc album containing music from Kingdom Hearts 3D: Dream Drop Distance, released on April 18, 2012. Among the songs included are tracks from The World Ends with You, originally composed by Ishimoto, who remixed them for Dream Drop Distance. Orchestral arrangements were provided by Kaoru Wada.

Track listing

Disc 1
No.	Title	Music	Length
1.	"Dearly Beloved" (arranged by Kaoru Wada)	Yoko Shimomura	2:43
2.	"Storm Diver"	Tsuyoshi Sekito	2:38
3.	"TWISTER -KINGDOM MIX-"	Takeharu Ishimoto	4:50
4.	"Traverse in Trance"	Yoko Shimomura	4:55
5.	"Hand to Hand"	Yoko Shimomura	2:32
6.	"Dream Eaters"	Yoko Shimomura	2:59
7.	"CALLING -KINGDOM MIX-"	Takeharu Ishimoto	4:05
8.	"UNTAMABLE"	Tsuyoshi Sekito	3:26
9.	"SOMEDAY -KINGDOM MIX-"	Takeharu Ishimoto	4:54
10.	"The World of Dream Drops"	Yoko Shimomura	2:22
11.	"Le Sanctuaire" ("Sanctuary")	Yoko Shimomura	3:05
12.	"La Cloche" ("The Bell")	Yoko Shimomura	3:37
13.	"Sweet Spirits"	Yoko Shimomura	1:33
14.	"Majestic Wings"	Tsuyoshi Sekito	3:47
15.	"Ever After"	Yoko Shimomura	2:18
16.	"Wild Blue"	Tsuyoshi Sekito	2:55
Total length:			52:39

Disc 2
No.	Title	Music	Length
1.	"Access the Grid"	Takeharu Ishimoto	4:34
2.	"Digital Domination"	Takeharu Ishimoto	6:31
3.	"The Nightmare"	Yoko Shimomura	3:12
4.	"Rinzler Recompiled"	Yoko Shimomura	3:24
5.	"Keyblade Cycle"	Takeharu Ishimoto	4:55
6.	"Gigabyte Mantis"	Tsuyoshi Sekito	3:46
7.	"The Fun Fair"	Yoko Shimomura	3:32
8.	"Prankster's Party"	Yoko Shimomura	2:18
9.	"Broken Reality"	Yoko Shimomura	2:18
10.	"Ice-hot Lobster"	Tsuyoshi Sekito	3:15
11.	"The Dream"	Yoko Shimomura	2:03
12.	"Ready to Rush"	Tsuyoshi Sekito	1:43
13.	"Dream Matchup"	Takeharu Ishimoto	4:22
14.	"One for All"	Yoko Shimomura	2:56
15.	"All for One"	Yoko Shimomura	2:51
16.	"The Flick Finalist"	Takeharu Ishimoto	2:49
17.	"Victor's Pride"	Tsuyoshi Sekito	1:29
18.	"Xigbar"	Yoko Shimomura	1:49
19.	"Distant from You..."	Yoko Shimomura	4:46
20.	"Sacred Distance"	Yoko Shimomura	3:46
21.	"Deep Drop"	Yoko Shimomura	3:35
Total length:			1:09:54

Disc 3
No.	Title	Music	Length
1.	"L'Oscurità dell'Ignoto" ("The Darkness of the Unknown")	Yoko Shimomura	4:34
2.	"Xehanort – The Early Years"	Yoko Shimomura	2:10
3.	"The Dread of Night"	Yoko Shimomura	3:39
4.	"L'Eminenza Oscura I" ("The Dark Eminence")	Yoko Shimomura	4:12
5.	"L'Eminenza Oscura II" ("The Dark Eminence")	Yoko Shimomura	4:21
6.	"L'Impeto Oscuro" ("The Dark Impetus")	Yoko Shimomura	4:58
7.	"My Heart's Descent" (arranged by Tsuyoshi Sekito)	Yoko Shimomura	3:03
8.	"The Eye of Darkness" (arranged by Tsuyoshi Sekito)	Yoko Shimomura	3:18
9.	"Link to All"	Yoko Shimomura	2:38
10.	"Sora"	Yoko Shimomura	2:30
11.	"Dream Drop Distance -The Next Awakening-" (arranged by Kaoru Wada)	Yoko Shimomura	8:57
12.	"Symphony No. 6 "Pastoral" Op. 6" (original music by Ludwig van Beethoven)	Nobuko Toda	9:09
13.	"L'Apprenti Sorcier" ("The Sorcerer's Apprentice"; original music by Paul Dukas)	Nobuko Toda	10:58
14.	"The Nutcracker Suite Op. 7" (original music by Pyotr Ilyich Tchaikovsky)	Nobuko Toda	9:57
15.	"A Night on Bald Mountain" (original music by Modest Mussorgsky)	Nobuko Toda	4:19
Total length:			1:18:43

=== Kingdom Hearts 10th Anniversary Fan Selection: Melodies & Memories ===
Kingdom Hearts 10th Anniversary Fan Selection: Melodies & Memories

Compilation album by Yoko Shimomura
- Released: September 19, 2012 (Japan)
- Genre: Video game soundtrack
- Length: 2:28:19
- Label: Walt Disney
- Producer: Yoko Shimomura

Kingdom Hearts 10th Anniversary Fan Selection: Melodies & Memories is a 2-CD album made in commemoration of the series' 10th anniversary. The tracks included in the album were chosen by fans in the series' official website. It was released in Japan on September 19, 2012.

Track listing

Disc 1
No.	Title	Length
1.	"Dearly Beloved" (from Kingdom Hearts)	1:13
2.	"Hikari -KINGDOM Orchestra Instrumental Version-" (光; music by Hikaru Utada, arranged by Kaoru Wada; from Kingdom Hearts)	3:42
3.	"Destati" ("Awaken"; from Kingdom Hearts)	2:55
4.	"Traverse Town" (from Kingdom Hearts)	1:21
5.	"Hand in Hand" (from Kingdom Hearts)	2:26
6.	"Kairi I" (from Kingdom Hearts)	1:19
7.	"Hollow Bastion" (from Kingdom Hearts)	2:26
8.	"Always on My Mind" (from Kingdom Hearts)	1:47
9.	"Another Side" (from Kingdom Hearts Final Mix)	2:39
10.	"Naminé" (from Kingdom Hearts Re:Chain of Memories)	2:15
11.	"Lord of the Castle" (from Kingdom Hearts Re:Chain of Memories)	4:33
12.	"Dearly Beloved" (from Kingdom Hearts II)	2:22
13.	"Passion -KINGDOM Orchestra Instrumental Version-" (music by Hikaru Utada, arranged by Kaoru Wada; from Kingdom Hearts II)	3:41
14.	"Passion ~opening version~" (written and performed by Hikaru Utada; from Kingdom Hearts II)	4:26
15.	"Lazy Afternoons" (from Kingdom Hearts II)	1:40
16.	"Missing You" (from Kingdom Hearts II)	1:53
17.	"The 13th Struggle" (from Kingdom Hearts II)	1:44
18.	"Roxas" (from Kingdom Hearts II)	1:18
19.	"Sora" (from Kingdom Hearts II)	1:29
20.	"Organization XIII" (from Kingdom Hearts II)	1:22
21.	"The 13th Reflection" (from Kingdom Hearts II Final Mix)	3:46
22.	"The Other Promise" (from Kingdom Hearts II Final Mix)	4:36
23.	"Riku" (from Kingdom Hearts II)	1:16
24.	"Darkness of the Unknown" (from Kingdom Hearts II)	4:36
25.	"Rage Awakened" (from Kingdom Hearts II Final Mix)	3:44
26.	"Fate of the Unknown" (from Kingdom Hearts II Final Mix)	3:26
Total length:		1:07:55

Disc 2
No.	Title	Length
1.	"Dearly Beloved" (from Kingdom Hearts 358/2 Days)	2:55
2.	"Musique pour la tristesse de Xion" ("Music for Xion's sadness"; from Kingdom Hearts 358/2 Days)	3:59
3.	"At Dusk, I Will Think of You..." (from Kingdom Hearts 358/2 Days)	4:00
4.	"Vector to the Heavens" (from Kingdom Hearts 358/2 Days)	3:51
5.	"Another Side -Battle Ver.-" (from Kingdom Hearts 358/2 Days)	3:02
6.	"Dearly Beloved" (from Kingdom Hearts Birth by Sleep)	5:24
7.	"Terra" (from Kingdom Hearts Birth by Sleep)	1:40
8.	"Ventus" (from Kingdom Hearts Birth by Sleep)	3:06
9.	"Enter the Darkness" (music by Takeharu Ishimoto, from Kingdom Hearts Birth by Sleep)	4:44
10.	"Aqua" (from Kingdom Hearts Birth by Sleep)	2:52
11.	"Dismiss" (from Kingdom Hearts Birth by Sleep)	4:38
12.	"Dark Impetus" (from Kingdom Hearts Birth by Sleep Final Mix)	4:55
13.	"Dearly Beloved" (arranged by Kaoru Wada; from Kingdom Hearts 3D: Dream Drop Distance)	2:43
14.	"TWISTER -KINGDOM MIX-" (music by Takeharu Ishimoto; from Kingdom Hearts 3D: Dream Drop Distance)	4:50
15.	"L'Oscurità dell'Ignoto" ("The Darkness of the Unknown"; from Kingdom Hearts 3D: Dream Drop Distance)	4:34
16.	"L'Impeto Oscuro" ("The Dark Impetus"; from Kingdom Hearts 3D: Dream Drop Distance)	4:58
17.	"Link to All" (from Kingdom Hearts 3D: Dream Drop Distance)	2:38
18.	"Hikari" (光; written and performed by Hikaru Utada; from Kingdom Hearts)	5:03
19.	"Fantasia alla Marcia for piano, chorus, and orchestra" ("Fantasia on the March"; arranged by Kaoru Wada; from Kingdom Hearts II)	7:45
20.	"Twinkle Twinkle Holidays" (bonus track; from drammatica -The Very Best of Yoko Shimomura-)	2:47
Total length:		1:20:24

=== Kingdom Hearts: III, II.8, Unchained χ & Unchained χ – Original Soundtrack ===
Kingdom Hearts: III, II.8, Unchained χ & Union χ [Cross] – (Original Soundtrack)

Soundtrack album by Yoko Shimomura, Takeharu Ishimoto, Tsuyoshi Sekito, Shōtarō Shima, Yoshitaka Suzuki
- Released: November 11, 2020 (Japan)
- Genre: Video game soundtrack
- Length: 10:01:31
- Label: Walt Disney

Track listing

Disc 1
No.	Title	Music	Arranger(s)	Length
1.	"Chikai -KINGDOM Orchestra Instrumental Version-" (誓い)	Hikaru Utada	Kaoru Wada	4:22
2.	"Face My Fears -KINGDOM Orchestra Instrumental Version-"	Hikaru Utada, Skrillex, Jason "Poo Bear" Boyd	Kaoru Wada	4:12
3.	"Dearly Beloved -KINGDOM HEARTS III Version-"	Yoko Shimomura	Yoko Shimomura, Yui Morishita	2:35
4.	"Face My Fears (Japanese Version)"	Hikaru Utada, Skrillex	Jason "Poo Bear" Boyd	3:40
5.	"Dive into the Heart -Destati- Third Inception" ("Awaken")	Yoko Shimomura	Natsumi Kameoka	7:03
6.	"Burning Ambition"	Yoko Shimomura	Yoshitaka Suzuki	1:10
7.	"Return of the Titans"	Yoko Shimomura	Yoshitaka Suzuki	0:45
8.	"Mount Olympus"	Yoko Shimomura		4:17
9.	"Hero's Fanfare"	Yoko Shimomura		3:09
10.	"The Deep End -Rock Titan's Rage-"	Yoko Shimomura	Yoshitaka Suzuki	4:45
11.	"Olympus Coliseum -The Shining Summit-"	Yoko Shimomura	Natsumi Kameoka	4:37
12.	"Go for It! -Into the Clouds-"	Yoko Shimomura	Natsumi Kameoka	2:21
13.	"Titanic Clash"	Takeharu Ishimoto		3:20
14.	"Sky of Wonder"	Yoko Shimomura		3:29
15.	"First Flight"	Tsuyoshi Sekito		3:10
16.	"Engage"	Tsuyoshi Sekito		4:23
17.	"Heart of Mystery"	Yoko Shimomura	Yūko Komiyama	2:43
18.	"The Afternoon Streets -KINGDOM HEARTS III Version-"	Yoko Shimomura	Natsumi Kameoka	6:00
19.	"Working Together -KINGDOM HEARTS III Version-"	Yoko Shimomura	Natsumi Kameoka	2:43
20.	"Pixel Hero"	Tsuyoshi Sekito		1:29
21.	"The Little Chef"	Tsuyoshi Sekito		2:18
Total length:				1:12:43

Disc 2
No.	Title	Music	Arranger(s)	Length
1.	"Dearly Beloved -Forest Memory-"	Yoko Shimomura		3:04
2.	"VERUM REX"	Takeharu Ishimoto		1:05
3.	"You've Got a Friend in Me -KINGDOM HEARTS III Version-"	Randy Newman	Yoko Shimomura	4:16
4.	"Toy Box Jam"	Yoko Shimomura		3:21
5.	"Shrouding Dark Cloud -Gigas Blast-"	Yoko Shimomura	Shōtarō Shima	2:58
6.	"It's a New Record!"	Tsuyoshi Sekito		1:01
7.	"The Corrupted -Monstrous Monsters-"	Yoko Shimomura	Yūko Komiyama	2:19
8.	"Sora -Orchestra of Toads-"	Yoko Shimomura	Yūko Komiyama	1:52
9.	"Tension Rising -Angelic Amber-"	Yoko Shimomura	Yūko Komiyama	3:00
10.	"Friendship's Union"	Yoko Shimomura	Yūko Komiyama	3:27
11.	"Skyward Striker"	Takeharu Ishimoto		5:41
12.	"Happy Hair Day"	Yoko Shimomura		3:26
13.	"Swingin' Free"	Yoko Shimomura		3:05
14.	"Happy Hair Day -Into the Forest Deep-"	Yoko Shimomura		4:36
15.	"Swingin' Free -Into the Forest Deep-"	Yoko Shimomura	Natsumi Kameoka	2:39
16.	"Maximus's Matchup"	Yoko Shimomura	Shōtarō Shima	2:07
17.	"Rowdy Rumble -The Crazy Carriage-"	Yoko Shimomura	Shōtarō Shima	3:04
18.	"Say Cheese!"	Yoko Shimomura	Hiroki Hirose	2:08
19.	"Sunshine Dancer"	Tsuyoshi Sekito		2:06
20.	"Lanterns in the Sky"	Shōtarō Shima		3:17
21.	"Tension Rising -Reaper's Revenge-"	Yoko Shimomura	Shōtarō Shima	3:58
22.	"The Lost Princess"	Shōtarō Shima, Yoko Shimomura	Shōtarō Shima	3:07
23.	"The Falling"	Shōtarō Shima, Yoko Shimomura		2:41
24.	"Anger Unchained"	Takeharu Ishimoto		3:12
25.	"Teardrop of the Sun"	Shōtarō Shima, Yoko Shimomura	Shōtarō Shima	3:05
Total length:				1:14:35

Disc 3
No.	Title	Music	Arranger(s)	Length
1.	"Shipmeisters' Shanty -KINGDOM HEARTS III Version-"	Yoko Shimomura	Hiroki Hirose	4:59
2.	"Blast Off! -KINGDOM HEARTS III Version-"	Yoko Shimomura	Hiroki Hirose	1:42
3.	"Star Explorer"	Tsuyoshi Sekito		3:53
4.	"Lock, Load, and Blast!"	Tsuyoshi Sekito		4:54
5.	"Crossing the Finish Line -KINGDOM HEARTS III Version-"	Yoko Shimomura	Hiroki Hirose	3:09
6.	"Monstropolis Now"	Yoko Shimomura		3:18
7.	"Monster Smash!"	Yoko Shimomura		2:49
8.	"Zero Hour -The Chase-"	Tsuyoshi Sekito		3:18
9.	"Monstropolis Now -Code 72-16-"	Yoko Shimomura	Natsumi Kameoka	3:02
10.	"Monster Smash! -Code 72-16-"	Yoko Shimomura	Natsumi Kameoka	2:18
11.	"Unforgettable -KINGDOM HEARTS III Version-"	Yoko Shimomura	Yūko Komiyama	3:10
12.	"Dual Hearts"	Takeharu Ishimoto		4:22
13.	"Winnie the Pooh -KINGDOM HEARTS III Version-"	Richard M. Sherman, Robert B. Sherman	Natsumi Kameoka	5:23
14.	"Bounce-O-Rama -KINGDOM HEARTS III Version-"	Yoko Shimomura	Yūko Komiyama	3:03
15.	"Little Lovely Moments"	Yoko Shimomura		2:36
16.	"Go! Go! Rumble Racer -Pudding Grand Prix-"	Yoko Shimomura	Yoshiki Nakamura	2:26
17.	"Flantastic Fight"	Takeharu Ishimoto		2:59
18.	"Hand in Hand -Attraction Flow Version-"	Yoko Shimomura	Yūko Komiyama	2:43
19.	"Dream Eaters -Link Version-"	Yoko Shimomura	Yūko Komiyama	2:12
20.	"8Bit Smasher -Link Version-"	Tsuyoshi Sekito		1:24
21.	"Savannah Pride -Link Version-"	Yoko Shimomura	Yūko Komiyama	2:22
22.	"An Adventure in Atlantica -Link Version-"	Yoko Shimomura	Yūko Komiyama	2:17
23.	"Mákaukau? -Link Version-" ("Are You Ready?")	Yoko Shimomura	Yūko Komiyama	2:58
Total length:				1:11:17

Disc 4
No.	Title	Music	Arranger(s)	Length
1.	"Frozen Wonderland"	Yoko Shimomura		3:52
2.	"Miracle on Ice"	Yoko Shimomura		3:26
3.	"Frozen Wonderland -Eternal Winter-"	Yoko Shimomura	Sachiko Miyano	3:17
4.	"Miracle on Ice -Eternal Winter-"	Yoko Shimomura	Sachiko Miyano	2:59
5.	"Let It Go -Japanese Version-" (translated into Japanese by Chikae Takahashi; performed by Takako Matsu)	Kristen Anderson-Lopez, Robert Lopez		3:45
6.	"Sky High Slider"	Tsuyoshi Sekito		4:01
7.	"The Coolest Contest"	Tsuyoshi Sekito		1:32
8.	"Frozen Heart"	Yoko Shimomura	Shōtarō Shima	1:17
9.	"No Surrender!"	Yoko Shimomura		3:54
10.	"True Love"	Yoko Shimomura	Shōtarō Shima	1:57
11.	"A Pirate's Adventure"	Takeharu Ishimoto		3:30
12.	"Flags of Fury"	Takeharu Ishimoto		6:11
13.	"A Pirate's Freedom"	Takeharu Ishimoto		4:20
14.	"Winds of Fate"	Takeharu Ishimoto		4:11
15.	"Flags of Fury -Leviathan Awakened-"	Takeharu Ishimoto		3:31
16.	"Hearts of Courage"	Yoshitaka Suzuki		4:16
17.	"Eye of the Storm"	Yoko Shimomura		3:20
18.	"The Victorious"	Yoshitaka Suzuki		9:26
Total length:				1:08:45

Disc 5
No.	Title	Music	Arranger(s)	Length
1.	"The Encounter -Metal Charge-"	Yoko Shimomura	Yoshiki Nakamura	3:10
2.	"AR -Augmented Rhythm-"	Takeharu Ishimoto		3:40
3.	"Robot Overdrive"	Takeharu Ishimoto		3:37
4.	"Heroes' Gathering"	Takeharu Ishimoto		3:53
5.	"Flash Tracer"	Tsuyoshi Sekito		4:14
6.	"Hero Upgrade"	Yoko Shimomura	Yoshiki Nakamura	0:38
7.	"Data Trace Complete"	Tsuyoshi Sekito		1:31
8.	"Zero Hour -The Rescue-"	Tsuyoshi Sekito		3:30
9.	"Baymax Rebooted"	Yoko Shimomura	Yoshiki Nakamura	2:35
10.	"Aqua -Dark Dive-"	Yoko Shimomura	Yoshiki Nakamura	4:00
11.	"Enter the Darkness -KINGDOM HEARTS III Version-"	Takeharu Ishimoto		5:43
12.	"Guardians of Light"	Yoko Shimomura	Yoko Shimomura, Natsumi Kameoka	7:20
13.	"The Star Fortress"	Tsuyoshi Sekito		3:29
14.	"THERMOSPHERE -KINGDOM HEARTS III Version-"	Kenichiro Fukui		6:44
15.	"Stranded Beyond"	Yoko Shimomura		4:34
16.	"Dive into the Heart -Destati- Third Revival" ("Awaken")	Yoko Shimomura	Shōtarō Shima	5:30
17.	"Graveyard Labyrinth"	Yoko Shimomura		5:05
18.	"Rise of the Union"	Yoko Shimomura	Yoshiki Nakamura	3:04
19.	"Forze Del Male -Dark Riku-" ("Forces of Evil")	Yoko Shimomura	Yoshitaka Suzuki	5:40
Total length:				1:17:57

Disc 6
No.	Title	Music	Arranger(s)	Length
1.	"Organization XIII -Mark of Fate-"	Yoko Shimomura		4:32
2.	"Dawn of Hope"	Yoko Shimomura		4:21
3.	"Chains to Bonds"	Yoko Shimomura	Yoshiki Nakamura	1:31
4.	"Roxas's Return"	Yoko Shimomura	Shōtarō Shima	2:36
5.	"Hearts as One"	Yoko Shimomura	Shōtarō Shima	4:31
6.	"Forza Finale" ("Final Force")	Yoko Shimomura	Yasunori Nishiki	7:28
7.	"Scala ad Caelum" ("Stairway to Heaven")	Yoko Shimomura		4:14
8.	"Edge of Existence"	Yoko Shimomura		3:17
9.	"Replicas"	Takeharu Ishimoto, Yoko Shimomura	Takeharu Ishimoto	5:05
10.	"Critical Crossroad"	Takeharu Ishimoto, Yoko Shimomura	Takeharu Ishimoto	6:17
11.	"True Darkness"	Yoko Shimomura		3:06
12.	"Dark Domination"	Takeharu Ishimoto, Yoko Shimomura	Takeharu Ishimoto	5:33
13.	"Hikari -KINGDOM Tres Orchestra Instrumental Version-" (光)	Hikaru Utada	Kaoru Wada	3:34
14.	"Chikai"	Hikaru Utada		4:35
15.	"Rhapsody in Tres for Piano, Chorus and Orchestra"	Yoko Shimomura, Takeharu Ishimoto	Yoko Shimomura	12:11
16.	"Epilogue"	Yoko Shimomura		3:55
17.	"Secrets of the Night"	Yoko Shimomura		2:07
Total length:				1:18:55

Disc 7
No.	Title	Music	Arranger(s)	Length
1.	"Cavern of Remembrance -KINGDOM HEARTS III Version-"	Yoko Shimomura	Tsuyoshi Sekito	2:03
2.	"L'Impeto Oscuro -Young Xehanort-" ("The Dark Impetus")	Yoko Shimomura	Yuki Kishida	6:38
3.	"L'Eminenza Oscura I -Ansem-" ("The Dark Eminence")	Yoko Shimomura	Sachiko Miyano	6:22
4.	"L'Oscurità dell'Ignoto -Xemnas-" ("The Darkness of the Unknown")	Yoko Shimomura	Natsumi Kameoka	5:10
5.	"The 13th Dilemma -Xigbar-"	Yoko Shimomura	Yūko Komiyama	6:21
6.	"The 13th Dilemma -Saïx-"	Yoko Shimomura	Yuki Kishida	6:16
7.	"The 13th Struggle -Luxord-"	Yoko Shimomura	Yūko Komiyama	6:30
8.	"Lord of the Castle -Marluxia-"	Yoko Shimomura	Sachiko Miyano	6:04
9.	"The 13th Struggle -Larxene-"	Yoko Shimomura	Natsumi Kameoka	5:00
10.	"Dismiss -Terra-Xehanort-"	Yoko Shimomura	Natsumi Kameoka	5:13
11.	"Vector to the Heavens -Xion-"	Yoko Shimomura	Yuki Kishida	6:30
12.	"Forze dell'Oscurita -Xehanort-" ("Forces of Darkness")	Yoko Shimomura	Sachiko Miyano	5:04
13.	"Key of the Brave"	Yoko Shimomura	Yūko Komiyama	2:17
14.	"Link to All -Lights of Destiny-"	Yoko Shimomura	Yūko Komiyama	3:39
15.	"Nachtflügel" ("Night Wing")	Yoko Shimomura	Yoko Shimomura, Sachiko Miyano	5:41
Total length:				1:18:48

Disc 8
No.	Title	Music	Arranger(s)	Length
1.	"Dearly Beloved -Unchained χ Version-"	Yoko Shimomura		3:30
2.	"Before the Daylight"	Yoko Shimomura		3:21
3.	"Wake Up, World!"	Yoko Shimomura		3:35
4.	"Mission Complete!"	Toshiyuki Sekito		0:49
5.	"Dearly Beloved -Union χ Version-"	Yoko Shimomura		5:03
6.	"Hand in Hand -Union χ Version-"	Yoko Shimomura		2:57
7.	"Game Central Station"	Toshiyuki Sekito		3:59
8.	"The Candy-Filled Kingdom"	Toshiyuki Sekito		2:35
9.	"The Fastest Racer"	Toshiyuki Sekito		3:09
10.	"A Nameless Planet"	Toshiyuki Sekito		2:53
11.	"Hero's Duty Troopers"	Toshiyuki Sekito		2:48
12.	"Welcome to Niceland"	Toshiyuki Sekito		3:09
13.	"I'm Gonna Wreck It!"	Toshiyuki Sekito		2:58
14.	"Dearly Beloved -χ Back Cover Version-"	Yoko Shimomura		2:14
15.	"Passing the Power"	Yoko Shimomura		3:51
16.	"The Foretellers"	Yoko Shimomura		3:15
17.	"Master of Masters"	Yoko Shimomura		5:42
18.	"Hikari -Ray of Hope MIX-"	Hikaru Utada	Punpee	5:33
19.	"The World Within"	Yoko Shimomura	Yūko Komiyama	2:51
20.	"Forest of Thorns"	Yoko Shimomura	Yūko Komiyama	2:39
21.	"Aqua -Mirror Illusion-"	Yoko Shimomura	Yūko Komiyama	3:39
22.	"Wave of Darkness I"	Yoko Shimomura		3:23
23.	"Wave of Darkness II"	Yoko Shimomura	Sebastian Schwartz	4:38
Total length:				1:18:31

== Reception ==
The music of Kingdom Hearts was overall well received. Greg Kasavin of GameSpot felt the background music was appropriate for each setting. However, he complained that the music loops were too short and repetitive. IGN reviewer David Smith was impressed by the production values that went into the music of Kingdom Hearts, namely the use of the New Japan Philharmonic Orchestra and arrangements of pieces such as "Night on Bald Mountain" and "Under the Sea". He also praised composer Yoko Shimomura's ability to maintain the atmosphere while keeping a "common thread of character running through the soundtrack". Daniel Kalabakov of SoundtrackCentral.com called Shimomura's orchestral composition "sophisticated", and stated that the score possesses unique qualities. He also stated that though the album is "excellent", he considered it one of Shimomura's weaker albums overall. In reviewing Shimomura's compilation album Drammatica, SoundtrackCentral.com reviewer Adam Corn considered the Kingdom Hearts tracks one of the highlights of the album. Jim Cordeira of Gaming Age stated the music was one of the best aspects of the first game and the orchestrated soundtrack is better quality than the "midi-sounding" tunes of previous Final Fantasy games. GameSpy's Benjamin Turner had positive comments about the main theme, but found some worlds' background music weak. A second GameSpy reviewer, Gerald Villoria, complimented both PlayStation 2 game soundtracks, but stated Kingdom Hearts II's soundtrack was not as good as the first game's.

Several tracks garnered extra attention and their own positive reception. "Hikari" debuted at number one on the Oricon Weekly Singles chart in Japan. It stayed at number one for three weeks and stayed on the chart for thirteen weeks. "Hikari" sold more than 270,000 copies during its first week on sale, and by August 2002, it sold over 860,000 copies in Japan. In 2008, Guinness World Records listed it as the best-selling video game theme song in Japan. Kalabakov complimented Utada's singing and the instrumentation of "Hikari", but commented that he was not a fan of pop songs. Turner was impressed by the translation of "Hikari" into English, and felt Utada's vocals were a good addition to the opening and ending segments of the game. "Passion" debuted at number four on the Oricon Weekly Singles chart in Japan where it stayed on the chart for nine weeks. G4TV's Miguel Concepcion was particularly pleased by "Dearly Beloved", the track that plays during the title screen. IGN echoed the sentiment and listed it as number four in their top ten list of RPG title tracks. They commented that the track lifted the doubts they had about the game's potential. Kalabakov referred to it as a fitting "fairy tale-style" piece to the game's setting. He further stated that it was a simple piece that was "not short on emotion".
