= Keep Tryin' (Hikaru Utada song) =

Single by Hikaru Utada

from the album Ultra Blue
- B-side: "Wings"
- Released: February 22, 2006
- Recorded: 2005
- Genre: J-pop
- Length: 4:53
- Label: EMI Music Japan
- Songwriter: Hikaru Utada
- Producers: Utada; Miyake Akira; Teruzane Utada

Hikaru Utada singles chronology
"Passion" (2005)	"Keep Tryin'" (2006)	"This Is Love" (2006)

Music video
- "Keep Tryin'" on YouTube

"Keep Tryin'" is a song recorded by Japanese-American recording artist Hikaru Utada for their sixth studio album, Ultra Blue (2006). It premiered on February 22, 2006 as the fifth single from the album in Japan. It was written and composed by Utada, whilst production was handled by Utada, Teruzane Utada, and Miyake Akira. It included the B-side track "Wings", which also appeared on the parent album. Musically, "Keep Tryin'" is a pop song with lyrics that contain self-empowerment themes. Upon its release, the track received generally mixed reviews from music critics.

The single was successful in Japan, peaking at number two on the Oricon Singles Chart. The single has been certified within four different categories by the Recording Industry Association of Japan (RIAJ). It was also the best selling digital single in Japan of 2006. An accompanying music video was shot by Utada's then husband Kazuaki Kiriya, and is his final collaboration with them; it features Utada in several different costumes, channeling several different roles in a cartoon-influenced city. The song had been promoted through several Japanese commercials and television shows.

== Background and composition ==
"Keep Tryin'" was written and composed by Utada, whilst production was handled by Utada, Teruzane Utada, and Miyake Akira. It was recorded by Atsushi Matsui and Daniel Burns in Japan 2005, and programmed by Matt Rohde and Utada. Utada and Rohde played the keyboards, and David Carpenter played bass guitar through the song's composition. In an interview with Oricon Style on February 22, 2006, Utada explained that the inspiration of the song came from their 2003 single "Colors"; "There was a 'Do your best!' kind of message in "Colors", but it wasn’t as distinct as in "Keep Tryin"." They exemplified their routine of riding underground train's in Japan as inspiration, stating that "For me, I think that even when I get on a free way, and see the man at the toll booth. I always tell the man 'thank you' or 'keep up the good work'...". They described the writing process the song as "refreshing". It premiered on February 22, 2006 as the fifth single from the album in Japan; it was also released around the world digitally on that same date. It included the B-side track "Wings", which also appeared on the parent album, plus an instrumental version of "Keep Tryin'".

Musically, "Keep Tryin'" is a pop song. Lyrically, the song discusses the theme of self empowerment, and talks about people doing the best they can at their passions. During the song's bridge section, a child's toy piano is playing; Utada reflected that its inclusion reminded them of a child's "admiration" and their questionable "future's". They stated that the "old" and "falling apart" piano playing was live instrumentation, which they bought from a random clerk at a toy department store. They also labelled the composition as "gentle".

== Critical response ==
Upon its release, "Keep Tryin'" received mixed reviews from most music critics. A staff member from CD Journal was positive in their review. They were positive towards the song writing, describing it as "profound", and complimented the song's "alive" melody. Daniel Robson from The Japan Times was generally positive in his review, calling it "wonderfully weird". However, an emeritus member from Sputnikmusic, Elijah K., was critical towards the song. He compared the track to the album's remaining content, and felt that the production of the track wasn't "interesting". He also believed the song writing of the track "lacked a spark". In December 2015, in honor of Utada's comeback into the music business, Japanese website Goo.ne.jp hosted a poll for fans to rank their favourite songs by Utada out of 25 positions; the poll was held in only twenty-four hours, and thousands submitted their votes. As a result, "Keep Tryin'" was ranked at number 23 with 11 votes in total.

== Music video ==
The promotional video for "Keep Tryin'" alludes to Utada's past PVs: "Final Distance", "Traveling", "Sakura Drops" and "Passion". There are also references to Utada's own cartoon cat creation, Chuichi, who is seen jumping on several rooftops while they are marching near the end of the video. First, when they stop by a store window filled with televisions, there is a kid pressed against the glass facing a reflection of himself, similar to "Final Distance". Later on, when they are walking through the office there are several secretaries typing, alluding to the drummers present in "Passion" PV.Also, the two dresses from their "Sakura Drops" PV are on display in a store window. Finally, during the biking sequence, there is a group of "people" marching along, similar to those in the traveling PV.

== Covers ==
In 2014, Kirinji recorded the song for Utada Hikaru no Uta, a tribute album celebrating 15 years since Utada's debut.

== Track listing ==
All tracks are written by Hikaru Utada.

No.	Title	Length
1.	"Keep Tryin'"	4:53
2.	"Wings"	4:52
3.	"Keep Tryin' (Original Karaoke)"	4:53
Total length:		14:40

== Charts ==
Chart (2006)	Peak position
Oricon weekly singles	2
Oricon yearly singles	82

== Certifications and sales ==
Chart	Amount
Oricon physical sales	125,000
RIAJ physical certification	250,000
RIAJ ringtone downloads	750,000+
RIAJ full-length cellphone downloads	100,000+
RIAJ PC downloads	100,000+
