= Ultra Blue =

Studio album by Hikaru Utada
- Released: June 14, 2006
- Recorded: 2002–2006
- Studio: Bunkamura Studio (Tokyo); Conway Recording Studios (Los Angeles); Saffron Hills Studio (London); Studio Terra (Tokyo); The Hit Factory (New York City); Westlake Audio (Los Angeles)
- Genre: J-pop; art pop; electronica
- Length: 56:32
- Label: Eastworld; Toshiba-EMI
- Producer: Hikaru Utada; Akira Miyake; Teruzane Utada

Hikaru Utada chronology
Exodus (2004)	Ultra Blue (2006)	Heart Station (2008)

Singles from Ultra Blue
- 1. "Colors" Released: January 29, 2003; 2. "Dareka no Negai ga Kanau Koro" Released: April 21, 2004; 3. "Be My Last" Released: September 28, 2005; 4. "Passion" Released: December 14, 2005; 5. "Keep Tryin'" Released: February 22, 2006; 6. "This Is Love" Released: May 31, 2006 (digital single)

Ultra Blue (stylized in all caps) is the sixth studio album by Japanese-American singer Hikaru Utada, released on June 14, 2006, by Eastworld. It is their first original Japanese language album in four years, following Deep River (2002). Ultra Blue contains thirteen songs, including six singles released between 2003 and 2006. While the arrangements for Deep River were done collaboratively, all but one of the songs on Ultra Blue were written, composed, and arranged solely by Utada, who also did the programming. In this album, the R&B elements that have been present since their debut are further diminished, and the majority of the songs have an electronic flavor with an emphasis on synth sounds.

Ultra Blue received mostly positive reception from music critics. The album was a commercial success in Japan, selling over 500,000 copies in its first week and debuting at number one on the Oricon Albums Chart. By the end of the fiscal year, it became 2006's best-selling original album by a Japanese female soloist. It was also the fourth most downloaded album of the year on iTunes Japan, and was certified as a million-seller by the Recording Industry Association of Japan (RIAJ). During summer 2006, Utada held a nationwide concert tour to help support the album titled Utada United 2006.

== Background and development ==
In 2002, around the time of the release of their third album Deep River, Utada signed an exclusive contract with the record label Island Def Jam. Soon after the release of the single "Colors" in 2003, they began working on and recording an English language album under the Utada name. In the meantime, Utada held their Budokan tour Hikaru no 5, and also released the hit single "Dareka no Negai ga Kanau Koro," the theme song for the movie Casshern, and their first greatest hits album called Utada Hikaru Single Collection Vol. 1. In autumn 2004, they released their first English album Exodus under the name Utada, and in 2005 they restarted their activities in Japan, releasing the three singles "Be My Last," "Passion," and "Keep Tryin'" in autumn 2005, winter 2005 and winter 2006.

Utada said that during the experimental process of arranging and experimenting with their own arrangements for Exodus, they were able to "try out what they wanted to do with the 'sound,'" and that after the album's production, they came to prefer "simple" sounds and arrangements. In an interview at the time of the release of "Be My Last," they said the following;

Both of these two or three songs carry elements of “me” as a character, as well as fragments of my own direct experiences. But at the same time, they’re intertwined with this vast system of the world swirling around me—almost like the way existence itself is set up. If I were to draw it, it would be simple: I’m at the center, surrounded by a large circle, and within that circle all kinds of things are spinning, stagnating, flickering, colliding. Altogether it feels like a single small planet, where cycles of reincarnation, the past, the future, and all sorts of forces are swirling together. That might be the common foundation running through them.

"Be My Last" and "Passion," which were produced in succession, are also placed consecutively on the album, with the interludes between the two songs representing the wild feelings of "anger" that were in the middle of the two songs. The title of the interlude is "Eclipse," which means "God's wrath," and when the eclipse is over, the song is followed by "Passion," which is positioned as a "blue sky" for Utada. The song is not only "blue sky" but also "light of hope" and "joy of understanding." Utada explained the reason for choosing this song as the final song;

"I brought this song with the intention of expressing the joy of understanding and being understood at the end. With such an image of accepting both kindness and sadness with a broad heart, I ended up in this position."

== Writing and composition ==
"Blue"
The melody of this album's title tune clearly highlights the blue (melancholy) that is deeply engraved in everyone born into this world..

"Nichiyo no Asa"
"Nichiyo no Asa" is based on Utada's own image of Sunday mornings as "a time for everyone to escape from society."

"Making Love"
"Making Love" is a song that depicts a situation where a special person who you can show everything to without needing flattery moves to a faraway city.

Compared to its predecessor Deep River (2002), Ultra Blue features many songs with arrangements that emphasize the synth sounds that Utada programmed, with a variety of tones. Japanese culture website Real Sound said; "There are two patterns, one where the sounds are long in the background, and the other where the sounds are moving in the background, changing the taste of the songs."

The album begins with "This Is Love," which incorporates techno/electro elements in its track production. Utada explained that they were able to incorporate their own worldview and sense of values in the song, and deliberately take the lyrics out of the song in a way that they could not express before, and that they feel they have developed their own ability to express themselves. Musically, "Keep Tryin'" is a pop song. Lyrically, the song discusses the theme of self empowerment, and talks about people doing the best they can at their passions. During the song's bridge section, a child's toy piano is playing; Utada reflected that its inclusion reminded them of a child's "admiration" and their questionable "future's." They stated that the "old" and "falling apart" piano playing was live instrumentation, which they bought from a random clerk at a toy department store. They labelled the composition as "gentle."

"Blue" is the title track of the album that also serves as the centerpiece of the album, with a melody that quickly rises to a key of almost an octave in the chorus. The song "Nichiyō no Asa" is organically composed of several loops, and the lyrics are based on Utada's own image of Sunday mornings as "a time for everyone to escape from society." According to Utada, the song is the one that most expresses their own outlook on life, and they often cite it as one of their favorite songs of all time. Crafted as an up-tempo electro-pop number, the song "Making Love" is about Utada's friendship with their best friend who suddenly had to move to Osaka, and it is a tune that reveals their own distorted side. "Dareka no Negai ga Kanau Koro" was released before their U.S. debut, and its quiet composition, which incorporates mainly an acoustic piano and very few strings, allows the lyrics to stand more prominently.

"Colors" is the oldest song on the album, and has a song-like sentimentalism throughout over a track that also includes a two-step beat, with a melancholic first half that picks up quickly in the chorus. Commenting on including the song in the album, Utada stated; "I decided to include it from the beginning because I didn't want to have all the singles on the album in case someone wants to listen to my song half a century from now or something." "One Night Magic" features Masashi Yamada of The Back Horn, and features Utada's vocals with an elegantly melancholic quality and Yamada's voice with a hint of primitive madness over a samba rhythm. The ballad number "Kairo" combines strings that bring poignant and wistful imagery with an abstract rhythmic arrangement. "Wings" is a song with an arrangement that combines a sophisticated rhythm, a piano with a classical air, and a flute. According to Utada, the song is a "22-year-old 'Time Will Tell,'" and was inspired by a quarrel with their then-husband, Kazuaki Kiriya.

The melancholic sound of the acoustic guitar and Utada's emotional vocals stand out in the song "Be My Last," and the elimination of the bass and use of a mixolydian mode creates a melody reminiscent of Celtic music. According to Utada, the song expresses the thought of "rebirth, repetition, something starts, and when it grows up, you have to destroy it again, and life is a repetition of that," as well as the pain of such a repetition. "Eclipse (Interlude)" is an instrumental piece and has been described as "the most advanced electro music of the 2000s." It has been described as expressing a "convulsive rage" and "the feeling of opening doors one after another." "Passion" is the album's closing number and contains elements of genres such as alternative rock and ambient, with a backing track of looping tom drums and whistles. The lyrics focus on the thought, "A person in the middle of the flow of time, facing either direction in that sphere, and it is the passion and zest for life within you that connects the past, present, and future all together."

== Promotion ==
=== Singles and other songs ===
Six singles were released in Japan to promote Ultra Blue. "Colors" was released as a standalone single on January 29, 2003, through Toshiba-EMI. The song peaked at number one on the Oricon Singles Chart, and was certified million by the Recording Industry Association of Japan (RIAJ) for exceeding one million unit shipments. Another standalone single, "Dareka no Negai ga Kanau Koro," was released on April 21, 2004. It also peaked at number one on the Oricon Singles Chart, and was certified double platinum in Japan.

"Be My Last" was released as the album's third single on September 28, 2005. The song peaked at number one on the Oricon Singles Chart, and was certified double platinum just like its predecessor. "Passion" was released as the album's fourth single on December 14, 2005, and peaked at number four on the Oricon Singles Chart, while achieving a gold certification in the country. The album's fifth single, "Keep Tryin'," was released on February 22, 2006. It peaked at number two in the country, and was certified platinum.

"This Is Love" was released as the album's lead single digitally on May 31, 2006; the song was also used as a jingle for a Nissin Cup Noodle TV commercial. "This Is Love" was never retailed as a CD single and received a digital only release. Therefore, it was ineligible to chart on Oricon because of them not counting digital sales at the time. Despite this, the track was certified double platinum for ringtone downloads, platinum for full-length cellphone downloads, and Gold for full-length PC downloads. "This is Love" was the 9th most downloaded song on iTunes Japan during the year 2006.

=== Concert tour ===
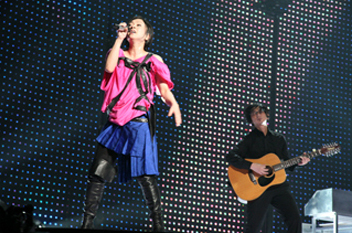
Utada performing on their Utada United 2006 tour during Summer 2006

Utada embarked on nationwide concert tour called Utada United 2006 to promote Ultra Blue. It was Utada's second concert tour of Japan following their Bohemian Summer 2000 tour. The Utada United 2006 tour ran from July 1, 2006, to September 10, 2006. A live DVD of the tour was released on December 20, 2006. The home release captures their performance at the Saitama Super Arena. The film was directed by filmmaker and Utada's then-husband Kazuaki Kiriya, and recorded using 60 high-definition cameras.

== Reception ==
Professional ratings
Review scores
Source	Rating
Hot Express	(favorable)
The Japan Times	(favorable)
CDJournal	(neutral)
MTVChinese.com	4/5 stars

Ultra Blue received generally positive reviews from music critics. The album received a glowing review by Hiraga Tetsuo of Hot Express; he stated that everything about the album is new and stimulating and that they can take on both the task of seriously polishing music as an artistic thing and making it catchy so that the listener's ears and hearts naturally enjoy it. Daniel Robson from The Japan Times was generally positive in his review, calling it a "top-notch pop record."

CDJournal stated that the album is a cut above the rest of J-Pop, but the lyrics and vocals have lost some of the vibrancy of their debut album, which they considered to be a concern. Pinjun of MTVChinese.com gave the album four out of five stars, saying that it shows a more mature Utada.

== Commercial performance ==
Ultra Blue sold 500,317 copies in its first week of release and debuted atop the Oricon Albums Chart. This marks Utada's fifth consecutive studio album to debut at the top spot since their first album First Love in March 1999. By the end of June, the album had topped the monthly chart, selling nearly double the 220,000 copies of the runner-up album Horizon by Remioromen. Ultra Blue continued to sell 156,978 copies on its second week of availability, ranking first on the Oricon chart for two consecutive weeks. Ultra Blue dropped to number two on the Oricon Albums Chart on its third week of availability by selling 80,351 copies, being knocked off the top spot by B'z's Monster.

In total, Ultra Blue lasted six weeks in the top ten, and stayed in the top 300 chart for 53 weeks. Cumulative sales for Ultra Blue reached 909,113 copies, making it Utada's first album to sell less than a million copies. Despite that, it still ranked seventh in the Oricon Yearly Albums Chart with 882,343 copies sold throughout 2006, making it the best-selling original album by a female artist that year. In the digital market, the album was a smash hit, with over 4 million digital downloads of the album's songs, and it was ranked number four in the annual iTunes ranking in the album category, which began in 2006. In addition, the song "Keep Tryin'" topped the singles category of the same chart for the year. The album has also been certified as a million-seller by the Recording Industry Association of Japan (RIAJ). By July 2008, the album sold about 1,150,000 copies globally.

== Track listing ==
All songs are written, composed and arranged by Hikaru Utada, except "Colors" (arranged by Hikaru Utada & Kei Kawano).

Ultra Blue track listing
No.	Title	Length
1.	"This Is Love"	4:58
2.	"Keep Tryin'"	4:53
3.	"Blue"	5:15
4.	"Nichiyō no Asa" (日曜の朝; Sunday Morning)	4:44
5.	"Making Love"	4:25
6.	"Dareka no Negai ga Kanau Koro" (誰かの願いが叶うころ; When Someone's Wish Comes True)	4:27
7.	"Colors"	3:59
8.	"One Night Magic" (featuring Masashi Yamada of The Back Horn)	4:39
9.	"Kairo" (海路; Sea Route)	3:34
10.	"Wings"	4:52
11.	"Be My Last"	4:30
12.	"Eclipse (Interlude)"	1:32
13.	"Passion"	4:42
Total length:		56:32

== Personnel ==
- Hikaru Utada – vocals, songwriting, production, keyboards, arranging (all tracks), programming (tracks 1–6, 8–13), acoustic piano (track 6), basic programming (track 7)
- Yamada Masashi – featured vocals, chorus (track 8)
- Teruzane Skingg Utada – production
- Miyake Akira – production, executive producer
- Doyama Shoji – executive producer
- Kawano Kei – arranging, keyboards, programming (track 7)
- Tomita Yuzuru – programming (tracks 1, 3–5, 8)
- Alexis Smith – programming (tracks 1–5, 8–10, 12–13)
- Matt Rohde – keyboards, programming (tracks 2, 13), acoustic piano (track 13)
- David Carpenter – bass (track 2)
- Kon Tsuyoshi – acoustic guitar (tracks 6, 11)
- Tsunemi Kazuhide – synthesizer programming (track 7)
- Great Eida Group – violin section (track 7)
- Abe Masashi Group – cello section (track 7)
- Takakuwa Hideyo – flute (track 10)
- Brio Taliaferro – programming (track 11)
- Forrest Robinson – drums (tracks 11, 13)
- Ben Mauro – guitar (track 13)
- Glenn Erwin – pro-tools operation (track 13)
- Goetz B. – mixing
- Goh Hotoda – mixing (tracks 6, 7), recording (track 6)
- Matsui Atsushi – recording (all tracks)
- Daniel Burns – recording (track 2)
- Pat Woodward – recording (track 13)
- Komori Masahito – assistant engineering
- Saito Yuta – assistant engineering
- Yamamoto Yasutaka – assistant engineering
- Nakauchi Taketoshi – assistant engineering
- Dave Emery – assistant engineering
- Flancesco Perlangeli – assistant engineering
- Matt Snedecor – assistant engineering
- Heath Aiken – assistant engineering
- Kazuaki Kiriya – art direction and photography
- Cho Kenji – art direction and design
- Ogawa Kyohei – styling
- Inagaki Ryoji – hair and make-up

== Charts ==
=== Weekly chart ===
Chart (2006)	Peak position
Japanese Albums (Oricon)	1
Taiwanese Albums (G-Music)	3
Taiwanese J-pop Albums (G-Music)	1

=== Monthly charts ===
Chart (2006)	Peak position
Japanese Albums (Oricon)	1

=== Yearly chart ===
Chart (2006)	Position
Japanese Albums (Oricon)	7

== Certification and sales ==
Region	Certification	Certified units/sales
Japan (RIAJ)	Million	909,113
Summaries
Worldwide	—	1,150,000

== Release history ==
Release history for Ultra Blue
Region	Date	Format	Label
Japan	June 14, 2006		
China	June 14, 2006		
Hong Kong	June 14, 2006		
Taiwan	June 14, 2006		
Thailand	June 20, 2006		
South Korea	June 22, 2006		
Canada	July 11, 2006		
United States	September 19, 2006		
