= Passion (Hikaru Utada song) =

"Passion / Sanctuary"

Single by Hikaru Utada

from the album Ultra Blue
- Released: December 14, 2005
- Recorded: 2005
- Studio: Westlake Audios Studios (California, United States); Bunkamura Studios (Tokyo, Japan)
- Genre: Alternative rock; ambient; ethereal
- Length: 4:44 (Album version); 4:27 (Opening version); 5:58 (After the Battle)
- Label: EMI Music Japan; Eastworld
- Songwriter: Utada
- Producers: Utada; Akira Miyake; Teruzane Utada

Hikaru Utada singles chronology
"You Make Me Want to Be a Man" (2005)	"Passion / Sanctuary" (2005)	"Keep Tryin'" (2006)

Alternative cover
- English cover for "Sanctuary"

Music video
- "Passion (Single Version)" on YouTube

"Passion" is a song recorded by Japanese-American singer-songwriter Hikaru Utada, taken as the fourth single from their sixth studio album Ultra Blue (2006). It was released on December 14, 2005, in two physical formats and via digital download, distributed by EMI Japan and EastWorld. "Passion", alongside its English counterpart "Sanctuary", were used as the theme songs to the Square Enix video game Kingdom Hearts II (2005). The tracks serve as successors to "Hikari" and its English counterpart, "Simple and Clean", the themes of Kingdom Hearts (2002).

The creator of the Kingdom Hearts franchise, Tetsuya Nomura, sought to collaborate with Utada again as they (Note: Utada uses they/them and she/her pronouns. This article uses they/them for consistency.) had previously written "Hikari", alongside his prospects for them to break into foreign and international markets. The conception of the two tracks were to emphasize a "dusk"-like vibe to the game, in comparison to "Hikari" which they described as the "dawn". Musically, "Passion" has been described by music commentators as a multi-genre tune, noting elements of alternative rock, ambient and "ethereal" music. The song's lyrics delve into themes of nostalgia and discusses the circumstances of past, present and future.

Upon its release, both songs received critical acclaim, with critics praising Utada's improved production and vocals. Additionally, several publications ranked the songs on their year-end lists of 2005–06 and soundtrack lists. Commercially, "Passion" was successful in Japan, peaking inside the top ten on the Oricon Singles Chart and TBS's Count Down TV chart; despite this, "Passion"'s sales were much lower than previous releases. However, it was certified Gold in three categories by the Recording Industry Association of Japan (RIAJ).

An accompanying music video was directed in China by Utada's then-husband Kazuaki Kiriya, which depicts Utada in a dreamscape filled with animated clouds, figures and a cathedral-like architecture. The clip was inspired by numerous anime films and aesthetics, along with the atmosphere portrayed in Kingdom Hearts II. The music video for "Passion" was generally well received, but critics questioned the lack of footage from the video game. In order to promote the single, Utada performed the tracks on television shows such as Music Station and Hey! Hey! Hey! Music Champ, as well as part of their Utada: In the Flesh 2010 concert tour. Since its release, "Passion" and "Sanctuary" have been widely considered as two of the best songs in video game history and recognized as a major factor in Utada's commercial rise in the western market.

== Background and conception ==
In early 2003, The Walt Disney Company and Square Enix confirmed the sequel to Kingdom Hearts (2002). Regarding the theme song, Nomura only had Utada in mind as he felt they were a part of the franchise's family, and felt that their music could break into both foreign and international markets. But scheduling time with Nomura proved to be difficult, as Utada worked on their second English language album Exodus in their hometown New York City; they had been signed to Island Def Jam the previous year as their headquarters discovered their success in Japan.

Kingdom Hearts II was publicly announced in July 2005, and Nomura confirmed Utada's second involvement with the series, "When we were creating the original game, there were a lot of factors that were influenced by Utada-san's theme song. That influence will once again be felt in [our development of] Kingdom Hearts II ..." Nomura's second reason for choosing Utada over another singer was because he noted that fans from the first Kingdom Hearts associated them with the franchise. Utada derived their inspiration for the song's concept and connection with the game from the worlds and characters in Kingdom Hearts, and received in-depth explanations and clues from Nomura. Nomura also noted that Utada's previous theme song "Hikari" influenced several factors in creating the games.

== Writing and recording ==
"Passion" and "Sanctuary" were already written by Utada prior to the game's release, but they re-wrote certain aspects in order to represent elements of the game. Utada noted the game's visual aesthetics and storyline as a major influence towards the songwriting, and that the finished versions would lead up to the ending version of the track—which appears during the credits of the video. Utada made their second song appearance in Kingdom Hearts II as they felt the experience was better than "Hikari", which they believed was difficult to accomplish because of the "soulless vibe" the game has portrayed; though they believed the visual appearance was "crucial", the singer based their thinking process on the characters personalities instead. In a special interview with Oricon Style in December 2005, Utada talked about the process:

"[Passion] is like. It has a feeling that connects together the end of the last game [Kingdom Hearts] and the sequel. Like, how it showed the characters and how she met and so forth. It was pretty easy to think up an image. It's like ... as if [Hikari] was the dawn, and Passion has a concluding or 'dusk' feeling to it. From here after, I wanted this song to communicate so many various ideas. While you can see some very ordinary imagery in the song, when you listen the imagery can become very dramatic."

Utada first completed the English lyrics to "Sanctuary", as they said that they found it difficult to write the Japanese lyrics for "Passion". Retrospectively, Utada stated to Oricon Style that both of the songs' lyrics were some of their favorite lyrics to date. Knowing that the CDs of the single would be insufficient with the lack of additional material, they decided to create a B-side track that was identical to the first song; this was titled the "After the Battle" version, the composition played during the credits of the game. They traveled to West Hollywood, California, to record their vocals at Westlake Audio Studios with Pat Woodward, whilst the Japanese version was recorded at Bunkamura Studios, Shibuya, Tokyo with Matsui Atushi. Additionally, they re-recorded their vocals for the "After the Battle" version in order to blend it with its new arrangement. The tracks were produced by Utada, with additional production credits to Akira Miyake and Teruzane Utada.

== Composition ==
Music Samples:
Passion
A 27-second sample of "Passion", which features Japanese song writing and a variety of genres such as alternative rock, ambient and ethereal music.

Sanctuary (Opening)
A 27-second sample of "Sanctuary (Opening)". Similar to "Passion", "Sanctuary" omits the use of overlapping vocals for a new bridge section that carries an electric guitar-solo and reversed vocals that say "I need more affection than you know,".

"Passion" is composed as a multi-genre tune that emphasizes the core elements of alternative rock, ambient and ethereal music. (Note: Critics such as MuuMuse, CD Journal, AllMusic, and Square Enix Music are the most reliable outlets that have referenced the song in different genres/categories of sounds.) MuuMuse's Bradley Stern asserted that "Passion" was Utada's "most complex" recording, noting the use of "passionate drumming" and ambient sounds. He described Utada's vocals as having an "ethereal"-like vibe. David Jeffries of AllMusic compared it to "A Whole New World" and the work of Nine Inch Nails. With instrumentation of drums, keyboards, electric guitars and synthesizers, the track was distinctive for its overuse of echoing throughout the composition. Additionally, critics noticed the overlapping technique of Utada's singing, along with the use of reversing certain sections of their voice to hide messages within the song.

The recording is composed in the key note of E major, and is set in time signature of common time with a tempo of 109 beats per minute, whilst its chord progression develops in the sequence of Amaj7–C#m7–Amaj7–C#m7–C#m7–C#m. "Passion"'s lyrics delve into themes of nostalgia, and discuss the circumstances of past, present and future, which Utada noted was relatable to the characters in the game. However, Yahoo! Music's Miko Amaranthine said "Passion" is "another love song that resembles a missing love but leaving life without him/her." Furthermore, "Passion", "expresses moments of nostalgic childhood memories that either fold or, sometimes intertwine" and eventually introduces a "new world". A member at Channel-Ai stated that the theme encompassed the parent album Ultra Blue, but highlighted on "hope" more than "sadness". Vibe's Mio Yamada said that the lyrics, "expressed weakness and strength simultaneously," and that the material was more mature than Utada's previous work.

Executive producers for Kingdom Hearts and head composer Yoko Shimomura said that the track needed to be more dramatic for the remaining of the accompanying score. In order to adapt to the remaining material on the soundtrack, Japanese musician Kaoru Wada arranged an orchestral version of "Sanctuary" that was performed by the New Japan Philharmonic Orchestra, which included the instrumentation of trumpets, several string sections and percussion.

== Release ==
"Passion" premiered on December 14, 2005, in two physical formats and for digital consumption, distributed by EMI Japan and EastWorld. Subsequently, the single and its B-side "Passion" (After the Battle) were included on the Kingdom Hearts II soundtrack; the video game that also included the single as its theme song was issued on December 22 that same year. Global distributions of the CD single commenced on December 26, whilst South East Asian editions were made available in stores on December 28. The DVD version came with the music video, alongside an Obi strip. The cover art was photographed by Mitsuo Shindo, who was alongside Utada's then husband Kazuaki Kiriya when shooting the clip; it depicts Utada in a vast corn field, which appears at the end. Various versions of "Passion"—such as the opening version, ending edit and orchestral instrumental—have been issued on three of the Kingdom Hearts soundtracks, including the Original Soundtrack Complete box set, and its special 10th anniversary edition. The single was also included on the soundtracks for the "remix" versions of the games, but "Sanctuary" served as its official theme song under their Western name Utada.

"Sanctuary" did not premiere in North America until March 28, 2006, with the video game, along with an end-September date in Australasia and Europe. Furthermore, EMI Music Japan distributed two versions of "Sanctuary"—the album edit and the "After the Battle" version— in Japan as a promotional single on January 1, 2009, through iTunes Store. On July 20, Island Def Jam premiered the track through radio stations in Japan, and subsequently served the album edit as the second single from their English album This Is the One (2009) two days later; only the North American editions feature the single. "Passion" and "Sanctuary" have appeared on compilation albums conducted by Utada, such as the Utada Hikaru Single Collection Vol. 2 (Nov 2010) and Utada the Best (Nov 2010).

== Critical response ==
Both songs received general acclaim from music critics. An editor of CD Journal praised the production, calling it "impressive". The reviewer praised the composition, stating that the sound as a "fantastic atmosphere" and their vocals as "beautiful". A reviewer from Channel-Ai gave "Passion" four-and-a-half stars out of five, but favored the track over "Sanctuary". For future releases, the reviewer also recommended Utada's Japanese counterparts over English dubs. Lex from VGMO.com gave the song eight stars, commending the production and sound. However, she said that she found "Passion" more "satisfying" than Sanctuary. Writing from the same publication, Harry Simons praised the single and said that it was better than Utada's previous contribution "Hikari", but stated that the "After the Battle" version should have been served as the single.

In his article for MuuMuse, Bradley Stern said that Utada's vocals and production, "brings the track to another level, transcending the patterns and limitations of most modern pop". Stern also valued the Japanese version as a "defining moment" to their artistic craft. An editor of Square Enix Music rated it nine out of ten points, commending the production and sound; they labelled it to be a "masterpiece". Blogcritics' Michael Pascua praised Utada's decision to add "Sanctuary" as the final track to This Is The One, stating, "[Sanctuary] showcases a strong musical style that isn't necessarily in the R&B flare that This is the One provides. They also help connect any video game player who hasn't necessarily listened to any of her Japanese albums or even knew that she had another English album ..." Céire Ní Dalaigh from The Arcade commented that "This track builds from the very beginning making it the perfect tune for any occasion. Whether it just be walking to work, building the pace at the gym or even just chilling out at home."

== Commercial performance ==
Commercially, "Passion" experienced success in Japan, although sales were much lower than their previous releases. It debuted at number three on the daily Oricon Singles Chart, one of their lowest peaks. Based on a six-day statistic, the single opened at number four on the weekly chart, selling 49,242 copies, making it their lowest first-week sales at the time. The following week, dated January 2, 2006, it slipped to number 10 with 18,868 copies sold. Because Oricon accumulated two weeks worth of sales due to their New Years policy, the company did not publish an update until January 16, where "Passion" moved two places down with 22,877 copies. The track made its final appearance inside the top 40 at number 16 selling 6,061 copies, dated on January 23. Overall, it spent 16 weeks inside the top 200 chart and sold 112,345 units by the end of its initial chart run, marking this the singers lowest selling single of their career, until their 2008 double A-side release "Stay Gold" / "Heart Station". At the end of 2006, Oricon ranked the single as the 91st best selling single in Japan. "Passion" debuted at number four on Tokyo Broadcasting System (TBS) Count Down TV chart, a similar opening to Oricon. The single charted for nine weeks, one of their shortest spans within the Count TV archive. Despite this, "Passion" was certified Gold twice by the Recording Industry Association of Japan (RIAJ) for digital and cellphone sales of 100,000 units.

== Music video ==
=== Background and direction ===
An accompanying music video for "Passion" was directed by Utada's ex-husband Kazuaki Kiriya, where it was filmed at the Gung-Ho Films studios in Beijing, China. At the start of the video, an animation sequence was created and produced by Kōji Morimoto, whom helmed a design-based campaign for the singers album Exodus, which was recognized as Fluximation-style animations. The remaining additions of computer generated imagery were generated by the company N-Design. Several workers had hand-made the scenery including the infrastructure of the grand-hall (seating for the drummers, floor design, etc.) and the cathedral (the walls, platform for Utada, floor); Kiriya placed a blue screen behind these structures in order to expand them to higher lengths. Utada said that majority of the dancers and drummers had choreographed intensely before commencing the video shoot; Utada had jokingly stated that they apologized several times whilst messing up the routines.

For the final scene, several producers hired horse riders in order to lead a herd of horses to run through the corn field. After this scene was complete, Utada wore the same outfit designed by Kozue Hibino, which is a large coated–dress with a trail of puffy inserts, and sung it in the same location. The ending scene was co-directed by Emmanuel Previnarie, Sze Kwan Chong and Marc Asmode, where they used a flying camera on a small helicopter to accomplish an aerial shot of Utada on the corn field. Regarding the female animation at the start, Utada stated that it was a representation of then and said that the inspiration of the video was from the 1997 film Princess Mononoke; "The people who were doing the on-the-spot filming seemed to have my sort of make. Like, not very adult-like and not very feminine ... much like as if we were all Princess Mononoke. Uggh, it looks like I'll be getting more female fans now!" Utada continued:

"The anime character that [Kōji Moromoto] made for the music video is of a girl that he made to really look like me. When I first looked at it, Mr. Morimoto kept drawing girl's faces that I thought looked different from my own, but on the way he must have changed it. I got an explanation out of him, and he said that he only noticed it that moment. I mean, I don't think I'm cute, but I thought he made my image into a really cute one! ... I was really happy about it though!

=== Synopsis and reception ===
The animated woman (pictured) is a representation of Hikaru Utada, and the creation was inspired by several anime films and shows such as the 1997 entry Princess Mononoke.

The visual opens with a small microscopic organism-like figure, eventually zooming out on an animated woman. Dancing in the wind, the opening chorus has the woman gliding through a vast field of clouds, often flying in front of the sun. A strong force field follows them as they are about to land onto buildings, but intercuts into Utada walking through digitized clouds. The camera then changes positions, aimed towards the singer, and showcases them walking through a large grand hall with purple colored Kachina's in cloaks, hitting drums to the song's beat. They walk into a large cathedral-like infrastructure and summons numerous pink kachina's dancing to the tune.

By the third chorus, the interior expands and more kachinas are summoned; this sequence also has flowing cherry blossom leaves. The bridge replays sections of the animated lady but with Utada singing the song, both overlapping each other. From there, the interior of the cathedral starts to disappear and move but then focuses on a herd of horses running through a vast corn field. The video ends with Utada stretching their arms against the sunlight, as the camera zooms away from them via bird's eye view, all shot by a toy airplane which was controlled by the director of the video.

The music video premiered exclusively to the Japanese website Hot Express on November 21, 2005, and was first broadcast on television networks, such as MTV, in early 2006; "Sanctuary" was dubbed over the video and premiered as well. The video attracted positive reviews from commentators. Simon Smith from VGMO.com noted that the visual "involve[d] anime Utada, lots of drum banging, even more horses, and even more dancing kachinas!" He concluded that the video was a "visual spectacular", but believed fans would be disappointed with the lack of visuals from Kingdom Hearts II. The visual was added to the video compilation, Singles Collection Vol.4 (2006); a special live version was placed as the final track.

== Promotion and other usage ==
Apart from its inclusion on the Kingdom Hearts video games, Utada had performed the track on several television and concert shows. They first sang the track on Japan's Music Station, where it premiered on December 2, 2005; the backdrop featured architecture similar to the song's music video. Three days later, they made an appearance on the Fuji TV show Hey! Hey! Hey! Music Champ. Subsequently, they performed the track again on music shows Utaban, Music Fighter and CDTV between December 8–10; the latter performance was a repeat of them at Utaban but showcased different camera angles. To celebrate the 2005 Christmas season, Utada hosted a live special where they sang a piano-driven version of the track in a studio. "Passion" was performed on Utada's United 2006 concert tour as the opening track, and furthermore on their Utada: In the Flesh 2010; the singer had combined both "Passion" and "Sanctuary", performing both Japanese and English throughout the performance. A live version was published on their Vevo account, and again on iTunes Store with the rest of the show. The most recent performance was during their 2011 Wild Life concert, which was then distributed on Blu-ray in May 2011.

"Passion" and "Sanctuary" have been sampled several times by different musicians. Its first recorded sample was for Stevey Jay's track "Kingdom of Hearts", which appeared on his extended play The Streets and Watching (2008); the title is loosely derived from the video game title. American rapper XV sampled the ending version of "Sanctuary" for his song "When We're Done", which was included on his mixtape Zero Heroes (2010). Lil B., an American rapper, released a remix version of his single "Pretty Boy", which sampled the melody of "Sanctuary". British rapper and grime artist Devlin sampled the track in his single "London City", which appeared on his album Bud, Sweat and Beers (2010); the rapper credited Utada as a featuring artist. The following year, American rapper French Montana sampled the composition for a song with the same title, which then ended up on his mixtape Mac & Cheese 3 (2012). Electronic musician Groundislava remixed "Sanctuary" in 2013, and was noted for its chillout musical elements. In 2014, rapper Tony Moxberg released his single "Still Ridin'", which sampled the intro of "Sanctuary". That same year, Jimmy Jam and Terry Lewis, whom worked with Utada nearly 13 years prior on their album Distance, and Peabo Bryson covered "Sanctuary" for Utada Hikaru no Uta, a tribute album celebrating 15 years since Utada's debut. Jam and Lewis stated that Utada wanted to leave the "haunting aspect" as it was, but wanted to add different yet dynamic instrumentation. Both producers also said that Bryson was perfect to add as the sole vocalist to the track. Subsequently, "Sanctuary" was sampled on AC's song "She Fallin'", from the 2017 album Slappin' in the Trunk Presents: Flight School 2.

== Cultural impact ==
Similarly to "Hikari" and "Simple and Clean", both "Passion" and "Sanctuary" were successful worldwide, due to its success with Kingdom Hearts II; by March 2007, the English adaption of the game sold over four million units worldwide. According to Bradley Stern, reporting from MuuMuse, he said the recordings were their only entries that gained a global fanbase because of its influence through the video game phenomenon, which was rare of Asian markets to capture outside of their native countries. Similarly, Emily Goodman from Axs.com published an article on January 4, 2015, with the headline stating that Utada was "best known for her work on Kingdom Hearts". In the article, Goodman said that while Utada became popular with "Passion" and "Sanctuary", "Utada's musical success goes far beyond a single video game line. In addition to their work on the video game series, Utada has seen an incredible amount of success both in America and in Japan." Similarly, Alicia Joy from Culture Trip said the songs brought prominence to the rise of Utada's sales worldwide.

"'Passion' is perhaps Utada's most complex: The lyrics are nothing short of poetry, while the song itself fluctuates between various degrees of intensity and serene vulnerability ... To me, 'Passion' is the defining point of Utada's artistic craft."

— MuuMuse writer Bradley Stern's opinion about "Passion", its effect on Utada's musical career.

Both tracks have been recognized by publications as some of their best work, and even entered several top lists as the best video game theme song; Pete Schiecke from AOL Radio put the songs atop of his "10 Best Video Game Music Soundtracks". A large fan poll on Enix Origin hosted a list that ranked their top 10 Final Fantasy/Kingdom Hearts songs, and "Passion" / "Sanctuary" were placed a number four respectively. Miko Amaranthine from Yahoo! Music listed "Passion" as his sixth best Utada song. A member at Buzznet listed "Passion" and "Sanctuary" on their top playlist, whilst Joy mentioned the tracks in their "An Intro to Japanese Music in 5 Artists". Jenni Lada from Technology Tell recommended "Passion" over "Sanctuary", and also listed it as a "Recommended track" from the singers discography. IGN listed it as number four in their top ten list of RPG title tracks, commenting that the song "lifted the doubts she had about the game's potential".

Despite commercial success, "Passion" was not able to match the sales of "Hikari"; "Passion" sold over 112,000 physical units (with an additional 200,000 digital and cellphone units), coming to a total of over 350,000 units. However, the latter track sold over 860,000 units in Japan, making it one of their best selling singles. "Passion" also became their lowest selling single until their 2008 double A-side release "Stay Gold" / "Heart Station". In early 2013, an announcement confirmed the development of the third instalment of the Kingdom Hearts console game. In October that year, Teruzane Utada was asked on Twitter about their contribution towards the third installment, to which Teruzane replied, "Yes." The reply prompted a large response through social media in Japan and America. However, the following day Teruzane took to Twitter again to clarify that he and Hikaru are "undecided" on contributing towards the song, stating that he was "confused" by the question when he was asked.

== Track listing and formats ==
CD single

1. "Passion" – 4:44
2. "Passion" (After the Battle) – 5:58

CD and DVD

1. "Passion" – 4:44
2. "Passion" (After the Battle) – 5:58
  1. "Passion" (music video) – 4:50

Digital download 1

1. "Sanctuary" (Opening) – 4:15

Digital download 2

1. "Sanctuary" (Ending) – 5:58

== Credits and personnel ==
Credits adapted from the liner notes of the single's CD and DVD release.

Recording and pro-tools

- Recorded at Westlake Audios studios by Pat Woodward in California, and Bunkamura Studios in Tokyo by Matsui Atsushi. Mixed by Goetz B. at Bunkamura Studios. Mastered by Tom Coyne at Sterling Sound Studios, New York City.

Music credits

- Hikaru Utada – songwriting, composing, arrangement, production, vocals, vocal production, keyboards, programming
- Matt Rohde – keyboards, programming, piano
- Alexis Smith – additional programming
- Ben Mauro – guitar
- Glenn Erwin – pro-tools
- Akira Miyake – production
- Teruzane Utada – production

Visual credits

- Kazuaki Kiriya – art direction, photographer, video director
- Mitsuo Shindō – art direction, design
- Takayuki Aoya – design
- Kozue Hibino – stylist, costume designer
- Ryoji Inagaki – hair and make-up
- Hidenobu Okita – direction
- William Cheng – co-director
- Emmanuel Previnarie – flying camera
- Sze Kwan Chong – flying camera
- Marc Asmode – flying camera
- Ma Qingyuan – Gaffer
- Kang Yabiao – key grip
- Yuji Hayashida – production design
- Yoshi Akatsuka – art department
- Etsuko Aiko – art direction
- Huang Xinming – art direction, choreographer
- Motegi Yutaka – set decorator
- Wang Pu – set decorator

Animation credits

- N-Design Productions – GCI production
- Koji Nozaki – CGI director
- Takuya Fujita – CGI producer
- Shusuke Osanai – CGI chief designer
- Akihiro Nakamura – CGI designer
- Taketu Kosaka – CGI designer
- Naoko Ishibashi – CGI designer
- Hideaki Tajima – CGI designer
- Studio 4°C – animation production
- Koji Morimoto – director
- Takayuki Kusaki – CG director
- Marefumi Nihayashi – art director
- Mutsuko Kajigaya – in-between supervisor
- Tomoko Washida – color stylist
- Rika Hatakeda – animation producer
- Kotaro Hirukawa – animation producer

Management credits

- Gung-Ho Films – production
- Michael McDermott – line producer
- Gao Jingxin – production manager
- Amanda Bi – production supervisor
- Eriko Miyagawa – production co-ordinator
- Wang Bin – key production assistant
- Jasper Thomlinson – producer
- Teruzane Utada – executive producer

== Charts and certifications ==
=== Weekly and daily charts ===
Chart (2005–06)	Peak position
Japan Daily Chart (Oricon)	3
Japan Weekly Chart (Oricon)	4
Japan Digital Track Chart (RIAJ)	75
US Billboard World Digital Song Sales	7

=== Year-end chart ===
Chart (2006)	Peak position
Japan Yearly Chart (Oricon)	91

=== Certifications and sales ===
Region	Certification	Certified units/sales
Japan (RIAJ)	Gold	112,345
Japan (RIAJ) Full-length ringtone	Gold	100,000^{*}
^{*} Sales figures based on certification alone.

== Release history ==
Region	Date	Format	Label	Ref.
Japan	December 14, 2005	CD; DVD; digital download	EMI Music Japan; Eastworld	
Worldwide	December 26, 2005	CD; DVD	EMI Music Japan; Eastworld	
South East Asia	December 28, 2005	CD; DVD	EMI Music Japan; Eastworld	
Japan	June 13, 2006	digital download (Note: Because the single was not made available on iTunes Store worldwide, "Passion" was distributed with the parent album Ultra Blue.)	EMI Music Japan	
Australia	June 13, 2006	digital download	EMI Music Japan	
New Zealand	June 13, 2006	digital download	EMI Music Japan	
United Kingdom	June 13, 2006	digital download	EMI Music Japan	
Ireland	June 13, 2006	digital download	EMI Music Japan	
Germany	June 13, 2006	digital download	EMI Music Japan	
France	June 13, 2006	digital download	EMI Music Japan	
Spain	June 13, 2006	digital download	EMI Music Japan	
Taiwan	June 13, 2006	digital download	EMI Music Japan	
United States	June 13, 2006	digital download	EMI Music Japan	
Canada	June 13, 2006	digital download	EMI Music Japan	
Japan	January 1, 2009	digital download (Sanctuary; Opening) (Note: Single was distributed separately on iTunes Store in Japan only.)	Island Def Jam	
Japan	January 1, 2009	digital download (Sanctuary; Ending) (Note: Single was distributed separately on iTunes Store in Japan only.)	Island Def Jam	
Japan	July 20, 2009	airplay	Island Def Jam	
Japan	July 22, 2009	digital EP	Island Def Jam	

== See also ==
- Music of Kingdom Hearts
- Video game music
