= Hikari (Hikaru Utada song) =

2002 single by Hikaru Utada

Single by Hikaru Utada

from the album Deep River
- Released: March 20, 2002
- Recorded: 2001
- Studio: Bunkamura Studios; Shibuya, Tokyo
- Genre: Pop folk; electronica
- Length: 5:02
- Label: Toshiba EMI
- Songwriter: Hikaru Utada
- Producers: Utada; Teruzane Utada; Miyake Akira

Hikaru Utada singles chronology
"Traveling" (2001)	"Hikari" (2002)	"Sakura Drops" / "Letters" (2002)

Music video
- "Hikari" on YouTube

"Hikari" (Japanese: 光; "light") is a song recorded by Japanese–American recording artist Hikaru Utada for their fourth studio album, Deep River (2002). It was released on March 20, 2002, as the third single from the album in Japan. It was written and composed by Utada, whilst production and arrangement was handled by Utada, Teruzane Utada, and long-time collaborator Miyake Akira. The single, and a remix by Russell McNamara (under the alias PlaniTb), was used as the official Japanese theme song for the 2002 action role-playing video game Kingdom Hearts, and appeared on its original soundtrack.

Upon its release, the track garnered positive reviews from music critics, who highlighted the track as one of Utada's best singles, and commended their vocal abilities and songwriting. It was also successful in Japan, peaking at number one both on the Oricon Singles Chart and Tokyo Broadcasting System's (TBS) Count Down TV singles chart. It was certified double platinum by the Recording Industry Association of Japan (RIAJ) for physical shipments of half a million units. An accompanying music video was shot by their then-husband, Kazuaki Kiriya; it features Utada washing dishes and drinking water. It was performed on some of their concert tours, including the Utada United and Wild Life tour.

For international versions of Kingdom Hearts, Utada recorded an English language version of the song, entitled "Simple and Clean". Both the original edit and remix version by PlanitB served as international theme songs. It did not appear on Utada's English studio album Exodus (2004), but was released as an A-side 12-inch single with Utada's single "Colors" in 2003, and received positive reviews from most music critics. The original version was included on their 2009 English studio album This Is the One. "Hikari" and "Simple and Clean" were rerecorded in 2024, with the former released for their 2024 greatest hits album, Science Fiction, and the latter used in 2024 for the Kingdom Hearts Steam announcement trailer released on YouTube.

== Background and release ==
In February 2000, Japanese video game artist Tetsuya Nomura announced the development of an action role-playing video game named Kingdom Hearts. According to Nomura, he only had Utada in mind to create the theme song for the video game, so he had contacted them to collaborate; as a result, she accepted his offer. In a brief interview with IGN, Nomura further stated; "Her music has moved millions of fans, and I was absolutely thrilled when she agreed to contribute to this project. I see her as an icon for young artists and she also proves that music transcends national and language barriers."

"Hikari" was written and composed by Utada, whilst production was handled by Utada, Teruzane Utada, and long-time collaborator Miyake Akira. The song's instrumentation consists of keyboards and programming handled by Kawano Kei, synthesizers from Tsunemi Kazuhide, and an acoustic guitar from Akiyama Hironori. The song was recorded by Ugajin Masaaki and mixed by Goh Hotoda in 2001 at Bunkamura Studio, Shibuya, Tokyo. It was released as the third single from their fourth studio and third Japanese language album, Deep River (2002). Since then, the song has been remastered and re-released twice; the first on April 1, 2004, and the second time on December 9, 2014, for Utada's first greatest hits album Utada Hikaru Single Collection Vol. 1 (2003).

The song was also released in Japan and Taiwan as a CD single. Both formats included the original track, a remix each by Russell McNamara (under the alias PlanitB) and Alex Richboug (under the alias Godson), plus the instrumental version. The artwork for the CD singles was photographed by Takimoto Mikiya. It has a long-distance shot of Utada in a greyish living room. A promotional 12" vinyl was released by EastWorld Records in 2002, and included both the remixed tracks.

== Composition ==
"Hikari (song)"
A 30-second sample of "Hikari". Musically, "Hikari" is a pop folk song, as described by staff members from Japanese music magazine CD Journal.

Musically, "Hikari" is a pop folk song, as described by staff members from Japanese music magazine CD Journal. Square Enix Music's Neo Locke described the song's composition and melody in an extended review: "The acoustic guitar combined with the synth in the background creates a pleasant and gentle harmony that helps bring out Utada's voice." A reviewer from OngakuDB.com noted the acoustic guitar as one of the composition's key elements, and described its sound as "melancholy" and a big "impact". Similarly, Yeah! J-Pop! editor Hiromi Yonemoto noted that the acoustic instrumentation was an "unusual" change in Utada's normal pop musical style. Shinko Music's Hiroshi Shinito described "Hikari" as a mid-tempo ballad.

According to Kano, the editor in chief of Rockin'On Japan, he stated that the lyrical content discusses themes of mystery and daily life actions.

== Critical response ==
"Hikari" received positive reviews from most music critics. Neo Locke from Square Enix Music was positive in his review, saying "'Hikari' has always impressed me for having a very recognizable and easy to manipulate melody despite the fact that the vocals are the only melodic line in the piece — partially due once again to Hikaru Utada's strong and versatile voice." He awarded the single seven out of ten points. Staff members from CD Journal complimented Utada's "simple" and "distinctive" vocals, and their songwriting. Similarly, a reviewer from OngakuDB.com praised Utada's vocals and expressed happiness for the song's nostalgic vibe. Yeah! J-Pop! editor Hiromi Yonemoto believed that "Hikari" demonstrated some of Utada's best vocals to date, and labeled them and the song's melody as "synergistic". In a similar review, Shinko Music's Hiroshi Shinito praised the songwriting and the chorus. Although describing the song in a positive manner, Sharon G. from KpopBreaks.com compared the song to many other of Utada's music, and felt "Hikari" didn't come close to their "true sound". Despite Daniel Kalabakov from Soundtrack Central disliking pop songs, he complimented Utada's singing and the track's instrumentation.

== Commercial performance ==
Commercially, "Hikari" was a success in Japan. It became Utada's seventh single to debut at number one on the Oricon Singles Chart, with sales of 270,370 units. It stayed at number one for three consecutive weeks (their first of two singles to do so), and spent a total of 13 weeks on that chart. By the end of 2002, the single was ranked at number 10 on Oricon's Annual 2002 chart with sales of 598,130 units. This made "Hikari" their third single to reach inside the top ten of the yearly Oricon chart; the other two singles being "Sakura Drops" at number six, and "Traveling" at number two. The single was certified platinum by the Recording Industry Association of Japan (RIAJ) for physical shipments of 500,000 units. The single debuted at number one on Tokyo Broadcasting System's (TBS) Count Down TV chart during the chart week of March 30, 2002, their eighth non-consecutive single to do so. It stayed at the top spot for three consecutive weeks. The single stayed in the chart for 13 weeks, and was ranked at number eight on the 2002 Annual Chart. Despite it not charting on any digital record charts in Japan, it was certified gold by the RIAJ for 100,000 full-length cell phone downloads. According to the Oricon Style database, it is Utada's 11th highest selling single.

The remix EP Hikari -Ray Of Hope Mix- achieved the #1 in Japan iTunes.

== Music video ==
An accompanying music video was filmed by their then-husband, Kazuaki Kiriya. Initially, Utada intended to produce a more complex and intricate video for "Hikari" directed by Kiriya, but scheduling and work conflicts prevented this from happening. Instead, Utada conceived a simpler video of them washing dishes because they found it enjoyable. In a blog post, they further explained; "Actually we were to shoot the music video of 'Hikari' with him (Kazuaki Kiriya) but it didn't come true due to his scheduling conflicts at the last moment, and that's why we requested Kiriya urgently to shoot that dish-washing video." The video features Utada washing dishes in their kitchen; during some portions of the video, Utada drinks water, stops washing the dishes, and walks away from the camera. According to Utada, no further editing was needed, and filming was completed in one take.

The music video received positive reviews from critics. Naomi Gingfold of The Global Post commended the video's simplicity and its departure from Utada's other "beautiful and intricate music videos", stating "The camera did not move once. Occasionally she lip-synced along; occasionally she just washed dishes." Daniel Montesinos-Donaghy from Noisey Vice complimented Utada's ability to adapt to different roles through their music videos, specifically highlighting the "mundane" activity of washing dishes. A reviewer from OngakuDB.com noted a contrast between the song and the video, stating that the video had shown them "lonely" and the song more "gracious".

== Live performances and promotion ==
Utada has performed "Hikari" on several of their concert tours. Despite Utada's plans to promote the song between 2002 and 2003, they halted all promotional activities due to their diagnosis of a benign ovarian tumor, which was surgically removed that same year. Its first performance was in 2004 during their Bokuhan concert tour, where it was included as the first song performed. It appeared on the live DVD, which was released on July 28, 2004. It was included on Utada's debut English concert tour named Utada United. Featured as the closing number, it was later included on the live DVD, released on December 20, 2006. "Hikari" was performed during Utada's two date concert series Wild Life in December 2010. Since the track's release, it has appeared on three compilation releases: Utada Hikaru Single Collection Vol. 1 (2003), its 2014 remastered version, and a special bundle of the compilation and the vol. 2 collection on a USB. In 2014, Love Psychedelico covered the song for Utada Hikaru no Uta, a tribute album celebrating 15 years since Utada's debut.

== "Simple and Clean" ==
"Simple and Clean"

Song by Hikaru Utada

from the album This Is the One
- Released: 2003
- Recorded: 2001 (Bunkamura Studios, Shibuya, Tokyo)
- Genre: Pop folk; electronica
- Length: 5:02
- Label: Toshiba EMI, Island Def Jam, Epic Records (2024 Rerecording)
- Songwriter: Hikaru Utada
- Producers: Utada; Teruzane Utada; Miyake Akira

For international releases of Kingdom Hearts, Utada recorded an English version of "Hikari", named "Simple and Clean". Both the original edit and remix version by PlanitB served as the international theme songs. The original version was included on their 2009 English studio album This Is the One, as well as on the English release of Kingdom Hearts Original Soundtrack. It was released as a B-side 12-inch single with Utada's single "Colors" in 2003, which received positive reviews from music critics. It has been performed at two of Utada's concerts, Utada United in 2006 and In The Flesh 2010.

=== Background and composition ===
Much of the song's production is similar to the Japanese version, except the chorus was interpolated from "Uso Mitai na I Love You" (嘘みたいな I Love You), the 9th track of their 2002 album Deep River. The song was written and composed by Utada, whilst production was handled by Utada, Teruzane Utada, and Miyake Akira. The song included live instrumentation by Kawano Kei (keyboards and programming), Tsunemi Kazuhide (synthesizers), and Akiyama Hironori (acoustic guitar), whilst it was arranged by Utada and Kawano Kei. The song was recorded by Ugajin Masaaki and mixed by Goh Hotoda in 2001 at Bunkamura Studio, Shibuya, Tokyo. The song was also remixed by Russell McNamara (under the alias PlanitB). Like the Japanese version, Utada felt the writing process was difficult, elaborating in an interview with Jetanny Magazine:

"... [T]hat was so hard, it's just, and it felt strained, and as a result, I'm happy that I worked hard to do those, because those English versions are really good and "Simple and Clean," I think, is a really good song, and people—most of the people that know me here, they know me for that—but it's not ideal for me as a writer, to—because, actually, I changed the melodies for "Simple and Clean" and "Hikari," because when you change the language you're singing in, the same melodies don't work—and as a writer, it's just very frustrating to have, like—I wrote these melodies for Japanese words, and to have to write in English for that, it's just not right. And then, so, for this, uh, this contract with Island Def Jam, in the beginning I separated it to this English language album, and I don't do Japanese translations. I just, my integrity as an artist just would not take that, could not take that."

Musically, "Simple and Clean" is a pop folk song, as described by staff members from Japanese music magazine CD Journal. The song is written in the key of B♭ major and is set in time signature of common time with a tempo of 84 beats per minute. Utada's vocal range spans between the notes G3 to G5, specifically between the chorus lyrics: "When you walk away / You don't hear me say / Please oh baby don't go / Simple and clean is the way that you're making me feel tonight / It's hard to let it go".

=== Release and reception ===
"Simple And Clean (PLANITb Remix)"
A 16-second sample of the PlanitB remix of "Simple and Clean". It was featured in the intro of the 2002 video game Kingdom Hearts

The original edit and PlanitB remix of "Simple and Clean" first appeared on Utada's single "Colors" as a B-side, which was released on January 29, 2003. It was also available on the Taiwanese versions of "Colors", released in mid-2003. Near the end of 2003, "Simple and Clean" was released as an A-side 12-inch single with "Colors" in Japan; it included the original and PlanitB remix. The original version was included on their 2009 English studio album This Is the One.

Upon its release, "Simple and Clean" received positive reviews from most music critics. Benjamin Turner from GameSpy was impressed by the translation of "Hikari" into English, and felt Utada's vocals were a good addition to the opening and ending segments of the game. Michael Pascua from BlogCritics.org was generally positive, stating in a detail review; "Utada made a smart decision with the physical release of the CD: she included the songs "Simple and Clean" and "Sanctuary" from the Kingdom Hearts series. Both songs showcase a strong musical style that isn't necessarily in the R&B flare that This is the One provides. They also help connect any video game player who hasn't necessarily listened to any of their Japanese albums or even knew that she had another English album." He also labelled the song and "Sanctuary" "happy additions" to This Is The One.

=== Live performances and promotions ===
The song has been performed on some of Utada's concert tours. Its first performance was at a special event that celebrated Utada's 20th birthday in Japan on January 19, 2003; they sang "Simple and Clean" as the encore track. Throughout the song, they performed the acoustic guitar. When Kingdom Hearts was released in North America, Utada performed the song at one of their first performances outside of Japan. Despite Utada's plans to promote the song between 2002 and 2003, they halted all promotional activities due to their diagnosis of a benign ovarian tumor, which was surgically removed that same year. The song was included on their Utada: In the Flesh 2010 concert tour in North America and the United Kingdom. The most recent live performance of the song was during the 2022 Coachella Valley Music and Arts Festival.

=== Commercial performance ===
The remix EP Simple and Clean -Ray Of Hope MIX-, released on January 11, 2017, debuted at number 1 on the iTunes Store in 9 countries and charted for 26 different stores in the top 100, peaking at the number 2 on the US iTunes Store, making it the biggest peak by a Japanese artist in the North American iTunes store. On February 2, 2019, "Simple and Clean" charted at number 21 on the US Billboard World Digital Song Sales chart and peaked at number 3 on the issue date of February 16, 2009.

== Legacy ==
"I still vividly remember the promotional material for the release of Kingdom Hearts. The commercials that played on television featured the trademark song of the game, 'Simple and Clean' by Utada Hikaru. A lot of interest for the game was sparked by that song. The sounds behind Utada’s words alongside images of Disney characters grasped everyone’s attention. There was something special about this game, and everyone at the time could feel it."

— The Koalition's Jake James Lugo's opinion towards the song's success, in retrospect.

When the single was released and promoted through Kingdom Hearts, "Hikari" and "Simple and Clean" were widely considered a "hot topic" around the world of music, as described by a staff member at OngakuDB.com. Their inclusion in the video game's respective international versions was successful, as Kingdom Hearts sold over 4.78 million units worldwide, subsequently earning the rank of being the tenth best selling PlayStation 2 video game. Both songs were then included on the spin-off titles: Kingdom Hearts: Chain of Memories (2004), Kingdom Hearts Birth by Sleep (2010), and the remix versions Kingdom Hearts HD 1.5 Remix (2013) and Kingdom Hearts HD 2.5 Remix (2014). The first two games, alongside the original release, sold over 5.9 million units worldwide together. Both the original and remix versions of "Hikari" (alongside an orchestral instrumental by Kingdom Hearts composer Yoko Shimomura) were included on the first soundtrack, and the HD 1.5 Remix soundtrack. Due to the success of the songs, Utada was invited to record another track for the original video game's sequel, Kingdom Hearts II (2005). This track was the Japanese written "Passion", which was re-written to "Sanctuary" as part of the international releases. Jeff Chuang from Japanator.com believed that "Simple and Clean" is what Utada is "best known for" by their fans outside of Japan. Similarly, Emily Goodman from Axs.com believed that "Simple and Clean" was their most successful work outside of Japan.

"Hikari" and "Simple and Clean" are often cited as "one of the best video game songs in recent history", as described by Dannii C. from Celebmix.com. Alex Hanavan from The Young Folks listed the orchestral version of "Hikari", which also appeared during the credits section of Kingdom Hearts, at number two on the "Top Ten Video Game Theme Songs". He stated his reason through his extended review; "Kingdom Hearts has several 'theme songs' but the orchestrated version of 'Hikari' takes the cake with all the makings of a grand adventure. It resonates with the many themes of the games: friendship, teamwork, and adventure. 'Hikari' undoubtedly brings back wealth of memories for any fan of the franchise." GameFAQs's editor Pierce Sparrow listed both "Simple and Clean" and "Sanctuary" at number two on the "Top Ten Lyrical Songs for a Video Game". Sparrow stated: "It was a little too difficult for me to choose just one of the songs, seeing as they have very similar qualities... I doubt that anyone will disagree that these are two of the greatest theme songs ever produced."

"Hikari" brought Utada a number of accolades and award nominations. In 2008, the Guinness World Records listed the track as the best-selling video game single in Japan, and was included on the 2008 Gamer's Edition book; this is Utada's first, and current, induction into this. At the 17th Japan Gold Disc Awards in 2003, Utada won the Song of the Year award; they had also won two awards with the same name that year for the singles "Sakura Drops" and "Colors". Similarly, they also received the Silver Award for Foreign Production recognition at the 2003 Japanese Society for Rights of Authors, Composers and Publishers Awards (JASRAC). In December 2015, in honor of Utada's comeback into the music business, Japanese website Goo.ne.jp hosted a poll for fans to rank their favourite songs by Utada out of 25 positions; the poll was held in only twenty-four hours, and thousands submitted their votes. As a result, "Hikari" was ranked at number three with 97 votes in total.

A rerecorded version of "Hikari" was released on April 10, 2024 in Utada's greatest hits album Science Fiction. The version was preceded by the upgraded 4K resolution music video released in March 2024. "Simple and Clean" was also rerecorded and released in May 2024, following its use in the announcement trailer for the release of the Kingdom Hearts series on the Steam store. Both versions were produced by A.G. Cook.

== Accolades ==
Awards for "Hikari"
Year	Organization	Award	Result	Ref.
2002	Japan Gold Disc Awards	Song of the Year	Won	
2003	JASRAC Awards	Silver Award for Foreign Production	Won	

"Hikari" on listicles
Publication	Accolade	Year	Rank
The Young Folks	Top Ten Video Game Theme Songs	2012	2
GameFAQs	Top Ten Lyrical Songs for a Video Game	2010	2
Guinness World Records	Best-selling video game single in Japan	2008	No rank
Dynamo Games	The Best Video Game Songs of the Past 20 Years	2011	2
Game Informer	Best Video Game Soundtracks	2014	No rank

== Track listings and formats ==
- CD single
1. "Hikari" (光; "light") – 5:02
2. "Hikari" (光; "light") (PlanitB Remix) – 5:46
3. "Hikari" (光; "light") (Godson Remix) – 4:39
4. "Hikari" (光; "light") (Instrumental) – 5:02
- 12" inch vinyl
1. "Hikari" (光; "light") (PlanitB Remix) – 5:46
2. "Hikari" (光; "light") (Godson Remix) – 4:39
- Japanese digital EP
1. "Hikari" (光; "light") – 5:02
2. "Hikari" (光; "light") (PlanitB Remix) – 5:46
3. "Hikari" (光; "light") (Godson Remix) – 4:39
4. "Hikari" (光; "light") (Instrumental) – 5:02
- "Colors" / "Simple and Clean" 12" inch vinyl
1. "Colors" – 4:00
2. "Colors" (Instrumental) – 4:00
3. "Simple and Clean" – 5:02
4. "Simple and Clean" (PlanitB Remix) – 5:46
- "Simple and Clean (Ray Of Hope MIX) - EP"
1. "Simple and Clean" (Ray Of Hope MIX) - 5:33
2. "Hikari" (Ray Of Hope MIX) - 5:33
3. "Simple and Clean" (P's Club Mix) - 4:02
4. "Hikari" (P's Club Mix) - 4:02

== Credits and personnel ==
Credits and personnel adapted by the CD liner notes of "Hikari" and "Colors".

- Hikaru Utada – vocals, background vocals, songwriting, production, composing, arranging
- Teruzane Utada – production, arranging
- Miyake Akira – production, arranging
- Kawano Kei – arrangement, keyboards, programming
- Tsunemi Kazuhide – synthesizers
- Akiyama Hironori – acoustic guitar
- Ugajin Masaaki – recording
- Goh Hotoda – mixing, programming
- Russell McNamara (under the alias PlanitB; stylized PLANITb) – remixing, production
- Alex Richbough (under the alias Godson) – remixing, production
- Takimoto Mikiya – photography
- Kazuaki Kiriya – director

== Charts ==
=== Weekly charts ===
Chart (2002)	Peak position
Japan Singles (Oricon)	1
Japan Count Down TV Chart (TBS)	1

Chart (2019)	Peak position
US World Digital Song Sales (Billboard) as "Simple and Clean"	3

=== Monthly charts ===
Chart (2002)	Peak position
Japan Singles (Oricon)	1

=== Yearly charts ===
Chart (2002)	Peak position
Japan Singles (Oricon)	10
Japan Count Down TV Chart (TBS)	8
Taiwan (Yearly Singles Top 100)	94

== Certifications ==
Certifications for Hikari
Region	Certification	Certified units/sales
Japan (RIAJ) Physical single	2× Platinum	598,130
Japan (RIAJ) Full-length ringtone	Gold	100,000^{*}
^{*} Sales figures based on certification alone.

== Release history ==
Region	Date	Format	Label
Japan	March 20, 2002	CD single; digital download	Toshiba-EMI
Taiwan	March 20, 2002	CD Single	EMI Taiwan Inc.
New Zealand	February 3, 2003	"Simple and Clean"; CD Single with "Colors"	Toshiba-EMI
Australia	April 1, 2004	"Simple and Clean" and remix; Digital download	EMI Music
New Zealand	April 1, 2004	"Simple and Clean" and remix; Digital download	EMI Music
United Kingdom	April 1, 2004	"Simple and Clean" and remix; Digital download	EMI Music
Germany	April 1, 2004	"Simple and Clean" and remix; Digital download	EMI Music
Ireland	April 1, 2004	"Simple and Clean" and remix; Digital download	EMI Music
France	April 1, 2004	"Simple and Clean" and remix; Digital download	EMI Music
Spain	April 1, 2004	"Simple and Clean" and remix; Digital download	EMI Music
Australia	December 9, 2014	"Hikari"; Remastered digital download (Note: Neither the EP for "Hikari" or the parent album Deep River were released in these regions below; taken from her remastered album Utada Hikaru Single Collection Vol. 1 (2003).)	Virgin Music
New Zealand	December 9, 2014	"Hikari"; Remastered digital download	Virgin Music
United Kingdom	December 9, 2014	"Hikari"; Remastered digital download	Virgin Music
Germany	December 9, 2014	"Hikari"; Remastered digital download	Virgin Music
Ireland	December 9, 2014	"Hikari"; Remastered digital download	Virgin Music
France	December 9, 2014	"Hikari"; Remastered digital download	Virgin Music
Spain	December 9, 2014	"Hikari"; Remastered digital download	Virgin Music
Taiwan	December 9, 2014	"Hikari"; Remastered digital download	Virgin Music
United States	December 9, 2014	"Hikari"; Remastered digital download	Virgin Music
Canada	December 9, 2014	"Hikari"; Remastered digital download	Virgin Music

== See also ==
- List of Oricon number-one singles in 2002
- Colors – corresponding article to "Simple and Clean".
- Music of Kingdom Hearts
- Kingdom Hearts video game.
