= Colors (Hikaru Utada song) =

Single by Hikaru Utada

from the album Utada Hikaru Single Collection Vol.1 and Ultra Blue
- B-side: "Simple and Clean"
- Released: January 29, 2003
- Recorded: 2002
- Genre: Synthpop
- Length: 3:59
- Label: EMI Music Japan
- Songwriter: Hikaru Utada
- Producers: Akira Miyake, Hikaru Utada and Teruzane Utada (1, 2); Russell McNamara (3)

Hikaru Utada singles chronology
"Sakura Drops" "Letters" (2002)	"Colors" (2003)	"Dareka no Negai ga Kanau Koro" (2004)

Audio sample
- file; help

Music video
- "Colors" on YouTube

"Colors" (stylized in all caps) is Hikaru Utada's 12th Japanese-language single (14th overall), and is the only single they released in 2003. It was released on January 29, 2003, and debuted at number one on the Oricon charts with 437,903 copies sold in the first week, and became their fifth single to achieve two consecutive weeks at the number one slot, a comparatively rare feat. Two versions were released, CD and DVD.

Included as CD-Extras on this single was a multimedia section containing 13 exclusive screensavers and 13 exclusive wallpapers. A special feature on the "Colors" DVD single is the Kanzou-sensei Report, which is a mini-documentary showing the production that went into the DVD, as well as behind-the-scenes shots of Utada working. This single reached number one on Oricon charts and charted for 45 weeks, their longest charting single ever. Though Kazuaki Kiriya was behind the art direction for the single, he did not take an active part as usual, with the single photography going to Kaoru Izima and the PV directing going to Donald Cameron. On the cover and the inside covers, there are drawings done by Utada themself (some designs include musical notation, the word 'yes' and a drawing of the Vatican). It became the third-best selling single of 2003 in Japan.

"Colors" had an extremely long performance season, which included 11 performances spanning over two months (except for the last performance, which was a special). This single reached number 27 on the World Charts for single airplay, and reached number six for sales. The most recent figures (May 25, 2006) show that the single sold 893,790 units in total. The song featured heavy ethereal and experimental tones for the first time in Utada's discography. It became their longest charting single ever with a 45-week trajectory on the Oricon Singles chart, selling 881,000 copies, and was number three on the Yearly Singles chart.

"Colors" was performed during Utada's two date concert series Wild Life in December 2010.

== Commercial tie-ins ==
Two special remixes of "Colors", an orchestral version and "Colors" (Godson Mix) were produced to promote the Toyota WISH in Japan, Taiwan, Thailand and Malaysia. These remixes are not included on this single or any of their releases.

"Simple And Clean" was the theme song for the US releases of Kingdom Hearts, Kingdom Hearts: Birth by Sleep, and Kingdom Hearts: Chain of Memories instead of "Hikari".

== Track listing ==
All tracks are written by Hikaru Utada.

CD version
No.	Title	Arranger	Length
1.	"Colors"	Hikaru Utada, Kei Kawano	3:59
2.	"Simple and Clean"	Kei Kawano, Hikaru Utada	5:03
3.	"Simple and Clean -PLANITb Remix-"	Russell McNamara	5:46
4.	"Colors -Original Karaoke-"		4:02

DVD version
No.	Title	Length
1.	"Making of Colors"	-:--
2.	"Colors"	-:--
3.	"Kanzou-sensei Report (Bonus Track)"	-:--

== TV performances ==
- [2003.01.12] CDTV
- [2003.01.29] Viewsic
- [2003.01.31] Music Station
- [2003.02.05] Sokuhou Uta no Daijiten
- [2003.02.06] Ax Music TV
- [2003.02.08] Pop Jam
- [2003.02.08] CDTV
- [2003.02.13] Utaban
- [2003.02.17] Hey! Hey! Hey!
- [2003.03.03] SMAPxSMAP
- [2003.12.17] Asahi Special

== Charts ==
Japan (Oricon)

Release	Chart	Peak position	Sales total
January 29, 2003	Oricon Daily Singles Chart	1	
January 29, 2003	Oricon Weekly Singles Chart	1	800,790
January 29, 2003	Oricon Monthly Singles Chart	1	
January 29, 2003	Oricon Yearly Singles Chart	3	
