= Benbrick =

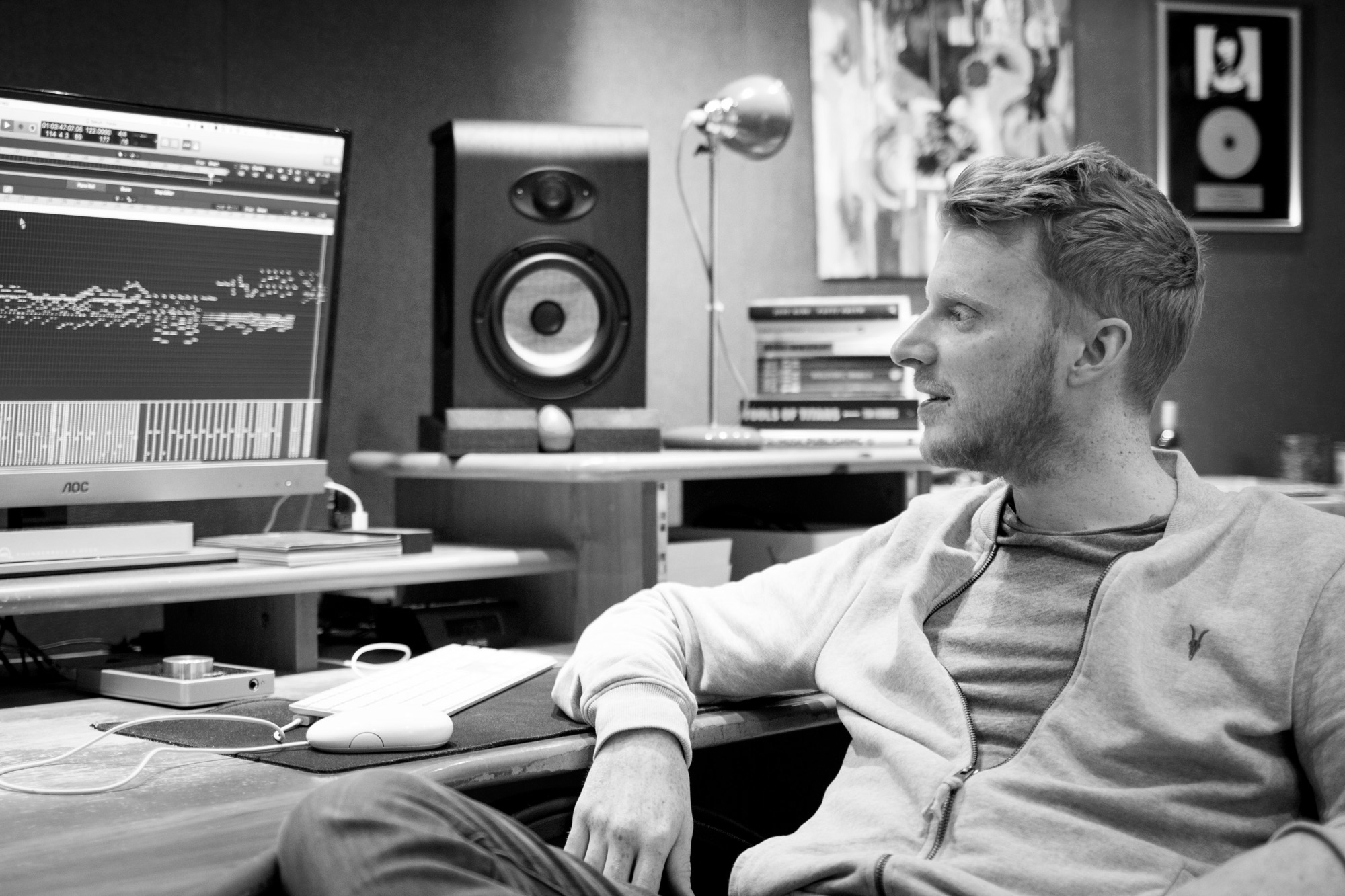

Background information
- Born: Paul Carter; 12 December 1988 (age 37)
- Origin: London, England
- Occupations: Producer, songwriter
- Years active: 2011–present
- Website: benbrick.co.uk

Paul Carter, also known as Benbrick, is a Peabody Award winning, multi-platinum selling English songwriter, producer and composer. He wrote Sakura Nagashi with Hikaru Utada from her 2016 Japan Record Award winning album Fantôme which has sold over one million copies. Benbrick is the producer and composer for the multi award-winning Have You Heard George's Podcast? with George The Poet. The podcast won 5 Gold British Podcast Awards in 2019 including the coveted Podcast of the Year award.

== Career ==
Benbrick wrote Sakura Nagashi (桜流し) with Hikaru Utada, it charted at #1 on iTunes and sold 600,000 singles worldwide. Sakura Nagashi was the end-credits music to the movie Evangelion: 3.0 You Can (Not) Redo which was the biggest film opening of 2012 and the 12th biggest opening of all time in Japan. The single was included on the 2016 album Fantôme which debuted at number one on iTunes in 20 countries, selling over 1 million copies in Japan, as well as reaching #1 on the US Billboard World Albums chart. Fantôme won Best Album at the 58th Japan Record Awards. In 2021 Sakura Nagashi was included on Utada's One Last Kiss (EP).

Benbrick also wrote Gasoline with Troye Sivan for the record TRXYE which charted on iTunes at #1 in 66 countries including the US, UK, Australia, and Canada. TRXYE debuted at #5 on the Billboard 200, with 80,000 copies sold in the first year.

In 2014 Benbrick composed a piece of music set to scenes from Ricky Gervais TV show Derek. Ricky Gervais discovered the music calling it "stunningly beautiful" In 2015 Benbrick composed a new piece set to series 2 of the same show - this time Gervais called Benbrick "a future genius". The pair met in 2016 after Benbrick created the trailer music for the Derek Christmas Special, which Gervais posted on his official YouTube channel. This led to Benbrick creating the visual and music for a TigerTime advert - one of Gervais's ambassadorial projects.

Benbrick wrote two songs on the Mary Jess debut album Shine which was recorded at Abbey Road Studios and features the Royal Philharmonic Orchestra. Stand As One was used for a global P&G TV advertising campaign. Benbrick also wrote 記得要微笑 on the 2014 Elva Hsiao record Shut Up And Kiss Me which reached #1 on the iTunes charts in Hong Kong and Taiwan.

=== Podcasting ===
In 2018 Benbrick started working with spoken word artist George The Poet composing and producing on his podcast "Have You Heard George's Podcast?". Everyman Cinema called the live show "a mind-bending experiment with musical storytelling" leading to 4 sell-out shows at Everyman Cinemas across the UK. In 2019 BBC Radio 4 called Episode 3 "a story that could change the world" and the podcast was nominated for 6 British Podcast Awards including Best New Podcast, Best Fiction, Smartest Podcast, Best Current Affairs, Best Arts & Culture, and Moment of the Year. In 2020 Benbrick picked up 3 Audio Production Awards including Best Podcast Producer.

== Discography ==
=== Songwriting Discography ===
- 2021: "If I Gotta Go" - Skrapz ft George the Poet
- 2020: "Start In Disguise" - Gary Go
- 2020: "Pharmacy Light" - Gary Go
- 2019: "Wishing on a.." - Mai Kuraki
- 2018: "Dealing With Dreams" - Luke Pickett (album)
- 2017: "Simple Love" – Luke Pickett
- 2016: "We Are" – Avec Sans
- 2014: "Remember to Smile" – Elva Hsiao
- 2014: "Gasoline" – Troye Sivan
- 2014: "Loving You Is Wrong" (Produced) – Luke Pickett
- 2013: "Wasted Dreams" – Luke Pickett
- 2012: "Sakura Nagashi" – Hikaru Utada
- 2011: "Heaven Is Empty" – Mary-Jess
- 2011: "Stand As One" – Mary-Jess
- 2011: "Begging" – Project Alfie

=== Solo Discography (as Benbrick) ===
- 2018: "陰り!" (EP) - Benbrick
- 2016: "Closer | Closure" (EP) – Benbrick
- 2016: "La Perfezione Brevemente" – Benbrick
- 2015: "Perfect Ending" – Benbrick
- 2015: "The Only Shortcut" – Benbrick
- 2015: "Magic" – Benbrick ft Spencer Ludwig
- 2014: "And So She Runs" – Benbrick
- 2014: "Forever Holding On" – Benbrick

== Podcast Discography ==
Year	Artist	Name	Season #	Role
2025 (TBC)	George The Poet	Have You Heard George's Podcast?	5	Producer / Composer / Sound Designer
2023	George The Poet	Have You Heard George's Podcast?	4	Producer / Composer / Sound Designer
2022	Nikolaj Coster-Waldau	Radioman	1	Producer / Composer / Sound Designer
2021	George The Poet	Have You Heard George's Podcast?	3	Producer / Composer / Sound Designer
2021	Matthew Syed	Sideways	1	Producer / Composer / Sound Designer
2020	BBC Sounds	The Cipher	1	Music
2020	Kim Noble	Futile Attempts	1	Producer / Composer / Sound Designer
2020	Alhan Gençay	Alhan's World	1	Music
2019	George The Poet	Have You Heard George's Podcast?	2	Producer / Composer / Sound Designer
2018	George The Poet	Have You Heard George's Podcast?	1	Producer / Composer / Sound Designer

== Filmography ==
- 2021: George The Poet - Black Yellow Red (Short Film) - Composer
- 2020: GRM Daily Rated Awards - It Was Written - composer
- 2020: BBC One One World: Together At Home - Our Key Workers - composer
- 2019: BBC Radio 4 Gangland (Welcome To The World of George The Poet) - composer
- 2019: George The Poet My Neighbourhood - composer
- 2019: Sentebale We Can Fight - composer
- 2017: McLaren 720s Advert - composer
- 2016: Disney Channel The Lodge (TV series) – vocal production
- 2016: David Shepherd Wildlife Foundation (TigerTime online ad) – music
- 2016: Music Station Sakura Nagashi live performance – music
- 2016: Welcome To Germany – additional music, programming, production
- 2014: Keeping Up with the Kardashians – additional music
- 2013: Procter & Gamble Worldwide TV Campaign – music
- 2012: Evangelion: 3.0 You Can (Not) Redo – End Credits music

== Awards and nominations ==
Year	Organisation	Award	Result	Project
2024	British Podcast Awards	Factual	Won	Have You Heard George's Podcast?
2024	British Podcast Awards	History	Silver	Have You Heard George's Podcast?
2024	British Podcast Awards	Podcast of the Year	Highly Commended	Have You Heard George's Podcast?
2022	New York Festivals Radio Award	Narrative/Documentary Grand Award	Won	Have You Heard George's Podcast?
2022	New York Festivals Radio Award	Narrative/Documentary Podcast	Won	Have You Heard George's Podcast?
2022	New York Festivals Radio Award	Music Documentary	Won	Have You Heard George's Podcast?
2022	New York Festivals Radio Award	Culture & the Arts Podcast	Silver	Have You Heard George's Podcast?
2022	Ambies	Best Original Score	Nominated	Have You Heard George's Podcast?
2022	Ambies	Podcast of the Year	Nominated	Have You Heard George's Podcast?
2022	Ambies	Best Scriptwriting, Non Fiction	Won	Have You Heard George's Podcast?
2022	British Podcast Awards	Creativity Award	Won	Have You Heard George's Podcast?
2022	British Podcast Awards	Smartest Podcast	Silver	Have You Heard George's Podcast?
2022	British Podcast Awards	Best Documentary	Bronze	Have You Heard George's Podcast?
2022	ARIA's	Best Factual Single Programme	Bronze	Have You Heard George's Podcast?
2022	ARIA's	Best Factual Series	Nominated	Have You Heard George's Podcast?
2022	ARIA's	Creative Innovation	Nominated	Have You Heard George's Podcast?
2021	Rose d'Or	Audio Entertainment	Nominated	Have You Heard George's Podcast?
2021	Audio Production Awards	Best Comedy Producer	Won	Futile Attempts
2021	Webby Awards	Best Scripted Fiction	Nominated	The Cipher
2021	Audio and Radio Industry Awards	Best Factual Single Programme	Won	Have You Heard George's Podcast?
2021	Audio and Radio Industry Awards	Best Fictional Storytelling	Bronze	Have You Heard George's Podcast?
2021	Audio and Radio Industry Awards	The Creative Innovation Award	Silver	Have You Heard George's Podcast?
2021	Audio and Radio Industry Awards	Best Comedy	Nominated	Futile Attempts
2021	British Podcast Awards	Creativity Award	Nominated	Futile Attempts
2020	Audio Production Award	Best Podcast Producer	Won	Have You Heard George's Podcast?
2020	Audio Production Award	Best Arts Producer	Won	Have You Heard George's Podcast?
2020	Audio Production Award	Best Sound Designer	Won	Have You Heard George's Podcast?
2020	Audio Production Award	Best Music Producer	Nominated	Have You Heard George's Podcast?
2020	Peabody Awards	Podcast/Radio Award	Won	Have You Heard George's Podcast?
2020	Webby Awards	Best Podcast Series	Nominated	Have You Heard George's Podcast?
2020	Broadcasting Press Guild	Podcast of the Year	Won	Have You Heard George's Podcast?
2020	NME	Best Podcast	Won	Have You Heard George's Podcast?
2019	British Podcast Awards	Audioboom Podcast of the Year	Won	Have You Heard George's Podcast?
2019	British Podcast Awards	Best Arts & Culture	Won	Have You Heard George's Podcast?
2019	British Podcast Awards	Best Fiction	Won	Have You Heard George's Podcast?
2019	British Podcast Awards	Best New Podcast	Won	Have You Heard George's Podcast?
2019	British Podcast Awards	Smartest Podcast	Won	Have You Heard George's Podcast?
2017	Japan Gold Disc Award	Best 5 Albums	Won	Fantôme
2016	Japan Record Awards	Album of the Year	Won	Fantôme
