= Richard Parker =

Richard Parker may refer to:

== Public officials ==
=== American ===
- Richard Parker (judge, born 1729) (1729–1813), American jurist who served on the Virginia Supreme Court
- Richard Parker (colonel) (1751–1780), American officer and son of Richard Parker the Virginia jurist
- Richard E. Parker (1783–1840), jurist, Senator from Virginia, grandson of Richard Parker the Virginia jurist
- Richard Parker (congressman) (1810–1893), judge and Congressman from Virginia
- Richard W. Parker (1848–1923), Representative from New Jersey
- Richard Bordeaux Parker (1923–2011), American diplomat and ambassador

=== British ===
- Richard Parker (mayor) (born 1963), British businessman and politician
- Richard Parker (MP for Malmesbury), Member of Parliament (MP) for Malmesbury, 1394
- Richard Parker (MP for Lyme Regis), MP for Lyme Regis, 1421

== Academics ==
- Richard Green Parker (1798–1869), United States educator
- Richard Barry Parker (1867–1947), British architect
- Richard Anthony Parker (1905–1993), Egyptologist
- Richard Davies Parker (born 1945), American law professor
- Richard Parker (economist) (born 1946), American economist and member of The Nation editorial board
- Richard A. Parker (1953–2024), mathematician
- Richard G. Parker (anthropologist) (born 1956), public health professional

== Sportspeople ==
- Richard Parker, full name of footballer Dick Parker (1894–1969)
- Rick Parker (baseball) (born 1963), baseball player
- Rich Parker (born 1987), British professional vert skater
- Richard Parker, erroneous name of footballer Reginald Parker (born 1902)

== Other people ==
- Richard Parker (mutineer) (1767–1797), British sailor, leader of the Nore Mutiny
- Richard Thomas Parker (1834–1864), British murderer
- Richard Neville Parker (1884–1958), English botanist and forester
- Richard Parker (1867–1884), the cabin boy victim of shipwreck, murder, and cannibalism in the incident of the court-case R v Dudley and Stephens
- Richard Parker (potter) (born 1946), New Zealand potter
- Rick Parker (artist) (born 1946), American artist, writer, and cartoonist

== Fictional characters ==
- Richard Parker (Life of Pi), a fictional tiger from the 2001 novel Life of Pi
- Richard and Mary Parker, fictional parents of Peter Parker, the alter-ego of Spider-Man
- Richard Parker, a cannibalized mutineer in The Narrative of Arthur Gordon Pym of Nantucket, Edgar Allan Poe's only complete novel
- Richard Parker, one of the protagonists of the 1989 film Weekend at Bernie's portrayed by Jonathan Silverman
- Richard Parker, protagonist of the 1992 film Consenting Adults portrayed by Kevin Kline
