= Rick Parker =

Rick Parker may refer to:

- Rick Parker (baseball)
- Rick Parker (artist)

== See also ==
- Richard Parker (disambiguation)
