= Downton Abbey: Original Music from the Television Series =

Soundtrack album by John Lunn and Chamber Orchestra of London
- Released: 19 September 2011
- Recorded: 2010–2011
- Length: 55:18
- Label: Decca
- Producer: John Lunn

Downton Abbey: Original Music from the Television Series is the first soundtrack that accompanied the ITV historical television series Downton Abbey. Composed by John Lunn and performed by the Chamber Orchestra of London, the album consists of 19 songs, mostly from the television score and three songs performed by Alfie Boe and Mary-Jess Leaverland. It was released on 19 September 2011 through Decca Records, a day after the second season's premiere.

== Background ==
John Lunn composed the series' musical score. Lunn wrote the opening theme after watching the first two episodes of the series, and opens with a simple piano tune where Bates looks out of the window, and expands to a grander theme with strings and orchestra provided for the first cue. The second cue begins with the events happening in the house, where "the house itself is like a well-oiled machine — a bit like the train, the energy". The tune ends with a third inversion on a 7th chord.

Lunn was influenced by the works of Ralph Vaughan Williams, Edward Elgar and Philip Glass, though some of the underlying harmony of the themes were inspired by popular artists, such as Coldplay, which infused some of its music with various orchestral arrangements. Despite the film's 20th century setting, Lunn refrained from providing music that sounded like 1912 and most of the score was performed by actual musicians, instead of using sampling and other technology, which resulted in the music sounding more like a film instead of a contemporary television show. He wrote romantic themes for Mathew and Mary, and Anna and Bates, as well as the theme for Thomas and Mrs. O'Brien, which Lunn said was the hardest to write.

Members from the London Symphony Orchestra, the London Philharmonic Orchestra and the BBC Symphony Orchestra jointly formed The Chamber Orchestra of London to contribute and perform music. Alastair King conducted the orchestra, which consisted of 33 strings—10 first violins, eight second violins, six violas, six cellos, three basses—in addition to utilizing cor anglais, French horn, vibraphone and piano (played by Lunn).

Besides the score, Mary-Jess Leaverland contributed vocals for "Did I Make the Most of Loving You", a shortened version of the seven-minute score suite developed as a lyrical song, while Alfie Boe performed cover versions of the 20th-century British songs "If You Were the Only Girl (In the World)" and "Roses of Picardy".

== Track listing ==
Downton Abbey: Original Music from the Television Series track listing
No.	Title	Artist	Length
1.	"Downton Abbey: The Suite"	John Lunn; Chamber Orchestra of London	7:09
2.	"Love and the Hunter"	John Lunn; Chamber Orchestra of London	3:18
3.	"Emancipation"	John Lunn; Chamber Orchestra of London	2:15
4.	"Story of My Life"	John Lunn; Chamber Orchestra of London	1:58
5.	"Fashion"	John Lunn; Chamber Orchestra of London	1:19
6.	"Damaged"	John Lunn; Chamber Orchestra of London	5:25
7.	"If You Were the Only Girl in the World"	Alfie Boe	3:47
8.	"Preparation"	John Lunn; Chamber Orchestra of London	3:27
9.	"Such Good Luck"	John Lunn; Chamber Orchestra of London	2:30
10.	"Us and Them"	John Lunn; Chamber Orchestra of London	1:53
11.	"Violet"	John Lunn; Chamber Orchestra of London	1:56
12.	"A Drive"	John Lunn; Chamber Orchestra of London	1:04
13.	"An Ideal Marriage"	John Lunn; Chamber Orchestra of London	2:43
14.	"Roses of Picardy"	Alfie Boe	3:55
15.	"Telegram"	John Lunn; Chamber Orchestra of London	1:45
16.	"Deception"	John Lunn; Chamber Orchestra of London	2:51
17.	"Titanic"	John Lunn; Chamber Orchestra of London	2:10
18.	"A Song and a Dance"	John Lunn; Chamber Orchestra of London	1:30
19.	"Did I Make the Most of Loving You?"	John Lunn; Chamber Orchestra of London; Mary-Jess Leaverland	4:18

== Personnel ==
Credits adapted from liner notes.

- Composer – John Lunn (tracks: 1–6, 8–13, 15–19)
- Producer – John Lunn (tracks: 1–6, 8–13, 15–19), James Morgan (track: 7, 14), Juliette Pochin (track: 7, 14)
- Piano – James Morgan (track: 7, 14)
- Performer – Chamber Orchestra of London (tracks: 1–6, 8–13, 15–19)
- Conductor – Alastair King (tracks: 1–6, 8–13, 15–19)
- Recording – Paul Golding (tracks: 1–6, 8–13, 15–19), Chris Barrett (track: 7, 14)
- Mixing – Paul Golding (tracks: 1–6, 8–13, 15–19), James Morgan (track: 7, 14), Juliette Pochin (track: 7, 14)
- Mastering – Nick Watson

== Charts ==
Chart performance for Downton Abbey: Original Music from the Television Series
Chart (2011)	Peak position
UK Compilation Albums (OCC)	24
UK Soundtrack Albums (OCC)	3
