= Downton Abbey: The Essential Collection =

Soundtrack album by John Lunn and Chamber Orchestra of London
- Released: 19 September 2012
- Recorded: 2011–2012
- Length: 70:55
- Label: Decca
- Producer: John Lunn

Downton Abbey: The Essential Collection is the second soundtrack that accompanied the ITV historical television series Downton Abbey. Composed by John Lunn and performed by the Chamber Orchestra of London, the album consisted of 23 songs, mostly comprising the television score and four songs performed by Mary-Jess Leaverland, Rebecca Ferguson and the Scala & Kolacny Brothers. It was released on 19 September 2012 through Decca Records, two weeks after the second season's premiere.

== Development ==
Lunn employed a 35-piece string orchestra in contrast to the previous seasons where he employed a 33-piece orchestra, and comparatively used a piano and an instrument resembling a French horn as the sole instruments for the score. The album featured the main score suite and the song based on it, "Did I Make the Most of Loving You?" performed by Mary-Jess Leaverland, while another original song "I'll Count The Days" performed by Rebecca Ferguson, who co-wrote the song with Don Black. Scala & Kolacny Brothers performed the cover of U2's "With or Without You" (1987) and The Police's "Every Breath You Take" (1983) which was featured in the album, except for their cover of "Last Christmas" (originally performed by George Michael and Wham!).

== Track listing ==
Downton Abbey: The Essential Collection track listing
No.	Title	Artist	Length
1.	"Downton Abbey: The Suite"	John Lunn; Chamber Orchestra of London	7:09
2.	"Love and the Hunter"	John Lunn; Chamber Orchestra of London	3:18
3.	"Emancipation"	John Lunn; Chamber Orchestra of London	2:15
4.	"Story of My Life"	John Lunn; Chamber Orchestra of London	1:58
5.	"Did I Make the Most of Loving You?"	John Lunn; Chamber Orchestra of London; Mary-Jess Leaverland	4:18
6.	"Nothing To Forgive"	John Lunn; Chamber Orchestra of London	2:34
7.	"Fashion"	John Lunn; Chamber Orchestra of London	1:19
8.	"Damaged"	John Lunn; Chamber Orchestra of London	5:24
9.	"New World"	John Lunn; Chamber Orchestra of London	1:51
10.	"I'll Count The Days"	John Lunn; Chamber Orchestra of London; Rebecca Ferguson	2:41
11.	"The Fallen"	John Lunn; Chamber Orchestra of London	3:01
12.	"A Glimpse of Happiness"	John Lunn; Chamber Orchestra of London	2:03
13.	"Elopement"	John Lunn; Chamber Orchestra of London	4:44
14.	"Preparation"	John Lunn; Chamber Orchestra of London	3:26
15.	"Us and Them"	John Lunn; Chamber Orchestra of London	1:53
16.	"Patrick"	John Lunn; Chamber Orchestra of London	1:52
17.	"Deception"	John Lunn; Chamber Orchestra of London	2:51
18.	"A Dangerous Path"	John Lunn; Chamber Orchestra of London	3:13
19.	"With Or Without You"	John Lunn; Chamber Orchestra of London; Scala & Kolacny Brothers	4:34
20.	"Violet"	John Lunn; Chamber Orchestra of London	1:56
21.	"An Ideal Marriage"	John Lunn; Chamber Orchestra of London	2:45
22.	"A Song and a Dance"	John Lunn; Chamber Orchestra of London	1:28
23.	"Every Breath You Take"	John Lunn; Chamber Orchestra of London; Scala & Kolacny Brothers	4:27

== Personnel ==
Credits adapted from liner notes.

- Composer – John Lunn (tracks: 1–18, 20–22)
- Producer – John Lunn (tracks: 1–18, 20–22), Steven & Stijn Kolacny (track: 19, 23)
- Orchestra – The Chamber Orchestra Of London
- Conductor – Alastair King
- Recording and mixing – Paul Golding
- Mastering – Nick Watson
- Piano – John Lunn (tracks: 6, 9, 11, 12, 13, 16, 18)

== Charts ==
Chart performance for Downton Abbey: The Essential Collection
Chart (2012)	Peak position
UK Compilation Albums (OCC)	83
UK Soundtrack Albums (OCC)	7
