= Fantôme (album) =

- Standard cover

Studio album by Hikaru Utada
- Released: September 28, 2016
- Recorded: 2012–2016
- Genres: J-pop; alt-rock; electronica; acoustic; R&B
- Length: 49:45
- Labels: Virgin; Universal Japan
- Producers: Hikaru Utada; Utada Teruzane; Miyake Akira

Hikaru Utada chronology
Utada Hikaru Single Collection Vol. 2 (2010)	Fantôme (2016)	Hatsukoi (2018)

Singles from Fantôme
- 1. "Sakura Nagashi" Released: November 17, 2012; 2. "Hanataba o Kimi ni" / "Manatsu no Tōriame" Released: April 15, 2016; 3. "Michi" Released: September 16, 2016

Fantôme is the ninth studio album and sixth Japanese language album by Japanese-American singer-songwriter Hikaru Utada, released on September 28, 2016. Although Utada had announced an indefinite hiatus from the public eye in August 2010, they continued writing and composing material with Teruzane Utada and Akira Miyake. Musically, Fantôme contains a collection of tracks that utilize acoustic and stripped-down instrumentations, alongside influences of pop, electronic, and R&B music. The lyrical content delves into themes of grief, sadness, love, and death—mostly influenced by the death of their mother, their second marriage, and the birth of their son in 2015.

Fantôme was a commercial success in Japan, reaching number one on the weekly Oricon Albums Chart with sales of over 253,000 units, becoming their eighth consecutive domestic number-one album. It additionally topped the US World Albums chart and has sold over a million copies worldwide. It won various awards, including Album of the Year at the Japan Record Awards and the Grand Prix prize at the CD Shop Awards. The singles "Sakura Nagashi", "Hanataba o Kimi ni", and "Manatsu no Tōriame" were released prior to the album's announcement, while "Michi" and "Nijikan Dake no Vacance" were released shortly before the album went on sale.

== Background and recording ==
In July 2015, Utada announced on their blog that they had given birth to a baby boy and had been working on a new album during their pregnancy. In March 2016, it was revealed by their team that they had returned from their five-year hiatus with two new digital singles, "Hanataba o Kimi ni" and "Manatsu no Tōriame", and a campaign called "New-Turn", with songs downloaded by Japanese fans via digital music services having part of their sales donated to planting cherry trees in areas damaged by the by 2011 Tōhoku earthquake.

On July 12, 2016, Utada posted on their Instagram account that they had finished recording for a new album. On August 8, the cover and track listing were revealed on Utada's web site. For the first time, Utada used Japanese titles for all the songs on the album. Fantôme was released physically in Japan and digitally worldwide on September 28, 2016, through Virgin Music and Universal Music Japan. This was their first record released following the 2013 merger of EMI Music Japan with Universal Music Japan. The album was released in two formats: a physical SHM-CD; and a digital download.

== Critical reception ==
Professional ratings
Review scores
Source	Rating
JpopAsia	9.5/10
MuuMuse	(positive)
Unrecorded.mu	70/100

Upon its release, Fantôme received critical acclaim. Ryo Miyauchi of Unrecorded.mu rated the album with 70 points out of 100, commending the singer's songwriting and vulnerability, especially highlighted in the album tracks "Ningyo", "Tomodachi", and "Kōya no Ōkami". Miyauchi added that he believed the record's sound was similar to their previous albums:

"Though Fantôme shows no sign from Utada of being nostalgic for who she once was, the album still sounds undoubtedly her. Fantôme creates an odd sense of time where it has one foot in the past and another slightly pointed to what’s next."

== Commercial performance ==
=== Japan and Asia ===
In Japan, Fantôme debuted at number one on the Daily Oricon Albums Chart, selling 87,088 units. For its first week on the Weekly Oricon Albums Chart, it entered atop the chart with over 252,581 copies sold; It sold more copies than its competitor of the week, Exile's greatest hits album Extreme Best (2016). Fantôme became their ninth number one album, their first studio album since Heart Station (2008) to debut at the top position, but also resulted in becoming their lowest first week sales for one of their Japanese-language albums.

In its second week, it stayed at number 1 with 103,854 physical units sold. The next week, it stayed at number one, selling 63,207 units, thus becoming their only studio album besides their debut First Love to chart at the pole position for more than two weeks, and then further extending this feat by one more week. Likewise, Fantôme debuted at the top spot on the Japan Hot Albums and the Top Albums Sales charts, both hosted by Billboard Japan.

Alongside this, Utada's digital single "Michi" placed atop of the Radio Songs chart during the week of October 10, 2016. On November 9, 2016, Oricon revealed its new weekly Digital Albums Chart. Fantôme ranked at number one on the chart, selling 6,537 digital downloads. It topped the chart a second week, shifting an additional 3,993 downloads. According to Billboard Japan, Fantôme was the best-selling digital album of the year, as well as the third-best-selling physical album, according to Oricon. Overall, it thus became the top-selling album of the year in Japan. The album sold 569,963 physical units in 2016 and 117,259 in 2017, according to Oricon's respective yearly sales ranking, thus totalling 687,222 physical units sold by December 2017.

=== Other territories ===
Upon its overseas release on the iTunes Store, Fantôme debuted at number one in Japan, Finland, Slovenia and 7 other Asian territories. It reached the top ten in the United States, Australia, Canada, Sweden, New Zealand and a further 6 countries. Additionally, it entered the top 20 in the United Kingdom and 5 further countries. According to online publications, it was labelled as their most successful release internationally, and had beaten previous positions that their English records: Exodus (2004) and This Is The One (2009) experienced.

The album opened at number two on the US Billboard World Albums chart. It marked their first record to enter the World Albums chart, their first Japanese release to enter the US charts, and their first album to obtain a position in the US since This Is The One in 2009; it sold approximately 1,992 units in its first two days of sale. The following week, it reached number one and had sold over 3,500 units.

== Promotion ==
Utada promoted the album with a series of interviews and appearances in magazines, websites and TV programs. They performed songs from the album on shows like Music Station (where they performed "Sakura Nagashi" for the first time live), NHK's SONGS (where they performed "Michi", "Tomodachi" and "Hanataba o Kimi ni"), CX's Love Music and NTV's News Zero. An Internet live stream event was held on December 9, 2016, called Sanjudai wa Hodo-Hodo, where Utada answered fan questions and performed the songs "Boukyaku" and "Ningyo" live. Two guests, the rapper Kohh and the DJ Punpee, joined Utada for the program.

=== Singles ===
Fantome is Utada's first Japanese-language studio album not to have any physical singles released. All the songs released as singles were distributed on online platforms exclusively. The first one was "Sakura Nagashi", the theme song of Evangelion: 3.0 You Can (Not) Redo, which was released on November 17, 2012, while they were still officially on hiatus. On April 15, 2016, "Hanataba o Kimi ni" and "Manatsu no Tōriame" were released, marking their official return to the music scene. The former became a big success for them, being certified double platinum for over 500,000 digital downloads and staying on the Billboard Japan Hot 100 over the course of the rest of the year, peaking at number 2. The latter received the award for "Video of The Year" at the 2016 MTV Video Music Awards Japan.

On September 13, 2016, shortly before the album's release, "Michi" was released to radio stations, and three days later as a digital download, while "Nijikan Dake no Vacance", a duet with Sheena Ringo, received a music video release. On January 19, 2017, the singer's 34th birthday, a music video for "Bōkyaku" (sung with Kohh) was also released.

== Track listing ==
All tracks are written by Hikaru Utada except where noted.

Fantôme track listing
No.	Title	Length
1.	"Michi (道; Road)"	3:36
2.	"Ore no Kanojo (俺の彼女; My Girlfriend)"	5:04
3.	"Hanataba o Kimi ni (花束を君に; A Bouquet for You)"	4:38
4.	"Nijikan Dake no Vacance (二時間だけのバカンス; Two Hour Only Vacation)" (featuring Sheena Ringo)	4:42
5.	"Ningyo (人魚; Mermaid)"	4:16
6.	"Tomodachi (ともだち; Friends)" (with Nariaki Obukuro)	4:22
7.	"Manatsu no Tōriame (真夏の通り雨; Midsummer Shower)"	5:38
8.	"Kōya no Ōkami (荒野の狼; Wolves in the Wilderness)"	4:34
9.	"Bōkyaku (忘却; Oblivion)" (featuring KOHH) (written by Utada, KOHH)	5:05
10.	"Jinsei Saikō no Hi (人生最高の日; The Best Day of My Life)"	3:10
11.	"Sakura Nagashi (桜流し; Flowing Cherry Blossoms)" (written by Utada, Paul Carter)	4:40
Total length:		49:45

== Personnel ==
Credits adapted from the album's liner notes.

=== Vocals ===
- Hikaru Utada – lead vocals (all tracks)
- Ringo Sheena – featured vocals (track 4)
- Nariaki Obukuro – featured vocals (track 6)
- Kohh – featured vocals (track 9)

=== Instrumentation ===
- Hikaru Utada – string arrangement (tracks 2–4, 7–8), brass arrangement (tracks 6, 8, 11)
- Nick Meier – guitars (track 1)
- Ian Thomas – drums (tracks 2–3, 5)
- Andy Waterworth – double bass (track 2)
- Ben Parker – guitars (tracks 2–4, 10), electric bass (tracks 3, 10), electric guitar (track 8)
- Simon Hale – acoustic piano (tracks 2–3, 8), conductor, string arrangement (tracks 2–4, 8), wurlitzer (track 8)
- Everton Nelson – strings leader (tracks 2–4, 8)
- Steve Price – strings recording (track 3)
- Sylvester Earl Harvin – drums (tracks 4–5, 8–10), drum machine (track 4)
- Jodi Milliner – electric bass (tracks 4, 8)
- Tanaka Yoshito – guitars (track 4), acoustic guitar (track 6)
- Asakawa Tomoyuki – harp (track 5)
- Francis Hylton – electric bass (track 6)
- Will Fry – percussion (track 6)
- Sid Gauld – brass leader, trumpet (tracks 6, 8)
- Andy Panayi – tenor saxophone (tracks 6, 8)
- Mark Nightingale – trombone (tracks 6, 8)
- Tamada Tom – drums (track 7)
- Yamaguchi Hiroo – electric bass (tracks 7, 9)
- Kawano Kei – band leader, conductor (tracks 7, 11), acoustic piano (track 7), string arrangement (track 11)
- Suhara Anzu – strings leader (track 7)
- Ogasawara Takumi – drums (track 11)
- Taneda Takeshi – electric bass (track 11)
- Kon Tsuyoshi – electric guitar (track 11)
- Amemiya Mamiko – strings leader (track 11)
- Steve Fitzmaurice – percussion (track 3)
- Darren Heelis – percussion (track 3), synth bass (tracks 7, 10)
- Paul Carter – piano, synth arrangement (track 11)

=== Production ===
- Hikaru Utada – executive producer, production, songwriting (all tracks)
- KOHH – songwriting (track 9)
- Komori Masahito – vocal editing (track 9)
- Paul Carter – production (track 11)
- Utada Sking Teruzane – executive producer
- Miyake Akiro – executive producer

=== Technical ===
- Hikaru Utada – programming (tracks 1–2, 4, 6–11)
- Tom Coyne – mastering (all tracks)
- Steve Fitzmaurice – recording, mixing (tracks 1–10), additional drum programming (tracks 3–4, 6–8, 10)
- Komori Masahito – vocal recording (tracks 1–8, 10), additional vocal recording (track 4)
- Inoue Uni – vocal recording (track 4)
- Darren Heelis – additional engineering (tracks 1–10), additional drum programming (tracks 3–4, 6–8, 10)
- Alexis Smith – additional programming (track 1)
- Joe Henson – additional programming (track 1)
- Matsui Atushi – recording (tracks 4–7, 9, 11)
- Mike Horner – recording (tracks 9–10)
- Paul Carter – programming (track 11)
- Goetz B. – mixing (track 11)
- Jeremy Murphy – strings recording assistance (track 3)

=== Artwork ===
- Seida Yu – art direction
- Julien Mignot – photography
- Ogawa Kyohei – styling
- Inagaki Ryoji – hair, make-up

== Charts ==
=== Weekly charts ===
Chart (2016)	Peak position
French Digital Albums (SNEP)	64
Japanese Albums (Oricon)	1
Japanese Digital Albums (Oricon)	1
Japanese Hot Albums (Billboard)	1
South Korean Albums (Gaon)	47
South Korean International Albums (Gaon)	5
US World Albums (Billboard)	1

=== Year-end charts ===
Chart (2016)	Peak position
Japanese Albums (Oricon)	3
Japanese Hot Albums (Billboard)	1
US World Albums (Billboard)	12

Chart (2017)	Position
Japanese Albums (Oricon)	34
Japanese Hot Albums (Billboard)	11
Japanese Digital Albums (Billboard)	5

Chart (2018)	Position
Japanese Hot Albums (Billboard)	86
Japanese Digital Albums (Billboard)	89

== Sales and certifications ==
Region	Certification	Certified units/sales
Japan (RIAJ) Physical	3× Platinum	750,000^{^}
Japan (RIAJ) Digital	Gold	100,000^{*}
United States	—	3,500
Summaries
Worldwide	—	1,000,000
^{*} Sales figures based on certification alone.^{^} Shipments figures based on certification alone.

Preceded by Budou (Southern All Stars)	Japan Record Award for the Best Album; 2016	Succeeded by The Kids (Suchmos)
