= One Last Kiss (Hikaru Utada song) =

2021 single by Hikaru Utada

- Cover artwork, illustrated by Neon Genesis Evangelion character designer Yoshiyuki Sadamoto

Single by Hikaru Utada

from the album Bad Mode
- Released: March 9, 2021
- Recorded: 2020
- Genre: J-pop
- Length: 4:12
- Label: Epic
- Songwriter: Hikaru Utada
- Producers: Hikaru Utada; A. G. Cook

"One Last Kiss" is a song by Japanese-American singer-songwriter Hikaru Utada. Utada recorded the song as the theme for Evangelion: 3.0+1.0 Thrice Upon a Time (2021), the fourth and final film in the Rebuild of Evangelion series. The song was issued digitally on March 9, 2021, followed by the eponymous One Last Kiss EP on CD and LP on March 10. Utada wrote and composed the song and co-produced it with A. G. Cook. After reading the film's screenplay, Utada began composing and programming "One Last Kiss" while envisioning its final scene, building the track from the synthesizer heard in its introduction. Its electronic production emphasizes rhythm and bass alongside synthesizers, piano, and vocal cut-ups, while the lyrics explore love and loss.

Critical commentary focused on the song's emotional expression, electronic production, and relationship with Neon Genesis Evangelion. "One Last Kiss" reached number one on both the Billboard Japan Hot 100 and Oricon Combined Singles chart and topped Oricon's Weekly Digital Singles chart for three consecutive weeks. It also reached number 40 on the Billboard Global 200 and number 11 on the US Billboard World Digital Song Sales chart. The Recording Industry Association of Japan (RIAJ) certified the song platinum for downloads and double platinum for streaming, representing 250,000 downloads and 200 million streams, respectively.

== Background and release ==
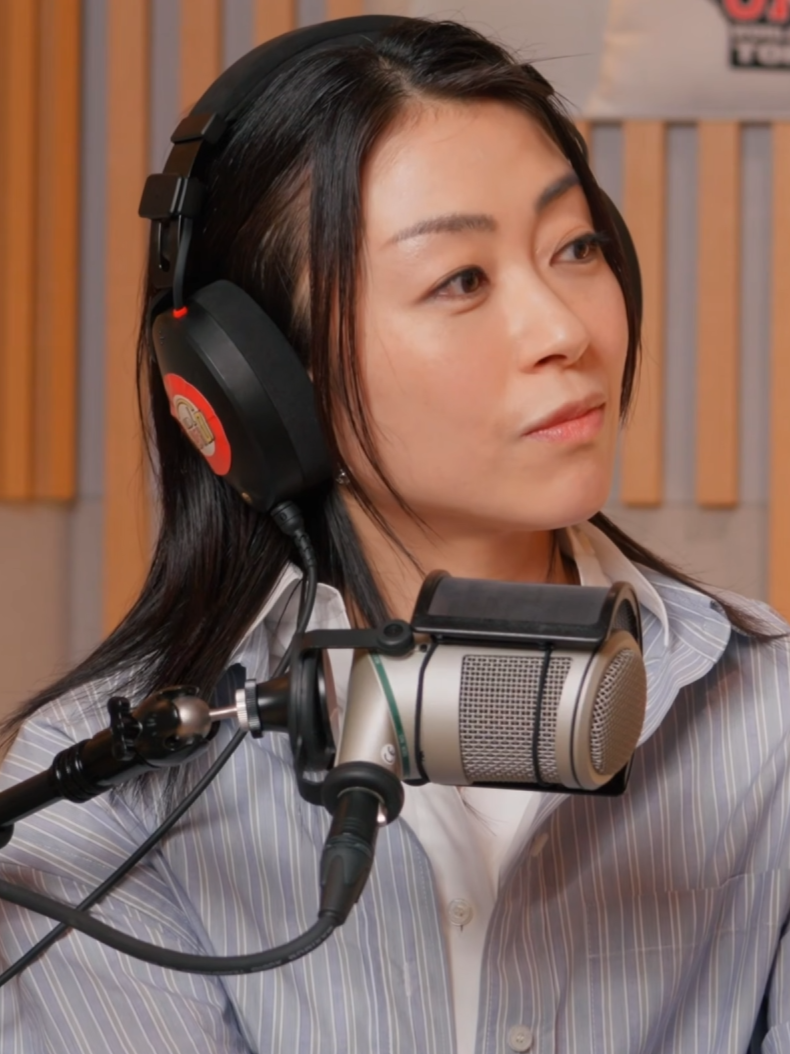
Hikaru Utada in 2026; they wrote, composed, and performed "One Last Kiss".

The Rebuild of Evangelion film series comprises four films that rework the television anime Neon Genesis Evangelion. Hikaru Utada contributed theme songs to its first three installments: "Beautiful World" for Evangelion: 1.0 You Are (Not) Alone (2007), "Beautiful World -PLANiTb Acoustica Mix-" for Evangelion: 2.0 You Can (Not) Advance (2009), and "Sakura Nagashi" for Evangelion: 3.0 You Can (Not) Redo (2012). Utada began an indefinite hiatus from music activity at the end of 2010 to focus on what they called "human activities" (人間活動, ningen katsudō). During the hiatus, Utada contributed "Sakura Nagashi" to Evangelion: 3.0; their record label described it as a one-off release that did not mark a resumption of music activity. Oricon reported that a strong request from the film staff and Utada's attachment to Evangelion led to its creation. The Japan Times later described "Sakura Nagashi" as a "lone, out-of-the-blue single" released during the hiatus.

On October 16, 2020, a new trailer for the fourth and final film, Evangelion: 3.0+1.0 Thrice Upon a Time, announced a January 23, 2021, theatrical opening. On December 9, the 22nd anniversary of Utada's debut, Oricon reported that "One Last Kiss" would serve as the film's theme song. Comic Natalie reported plans to issue the song digitally on January 24, one day after the planned theatrical opening, and the eponymous One Last Kiss EP on CD and LP on January 27; the EP collected Utada's songs for the Rebuild series. On January 14, the film's postponement in response to Japan's COVID-19 state of emergency prompted a corresponding delay to the music releases. On February 26, Music Natalie reported that the film would open on March 8, with the EP scheduled for digital release on March 9 and physical release on CD and LP on March 10.

== Composition and production ==
For their previous themes for the Rebuild of Evangelion film series, Utada wrote each song after hearing only a broad outline of the plot. For Evangelion: 3.0+1.0 Thrice Upon a Time, they read the screenplay and, while picturing its final scene, began composing and programming "One Last Kiss" from its first sound, the synthesizer in the introduction. Utada later told Billboard Japan that they spent considerable time programming the modulation of the opening synthesizer and consciously constructed the song from its introduction, seeking to pick up from, accompany, and expand upon the film's final scene. Producer A. G. Cook, founder of the record label PC Music and known for his work with Charli XCX, was credited as a co-producer of "One Last Kiss". Audio engineer Steve Fitzmaurice mixed "One Last Kiss". He identified the rhythm track as the main focus of the mix, particularly the movement of the bass, and said that the piano principally supported the song. Fitzmaurice also devoted considerable attention to the lead vocal, including how far it came to the foreground and the background reverberation applied to it.

== Music and lyrics ==
Chorus and bass transition
"One Last Kiss"
A 30-second excerpt illustrating the song's vocal-drop-like phrasing, chopped vocals, synthesizer textures, and the changing role of the bass across the transition.

Günseli Yalcinkaya of Dazed characterized "One Last Kiss" as a "stripped-down yet springy pop ballad", noting Cook's glitchy influence in its anthemic chorus and the track's skipping bass and chopped-up vocals. Music writer Muteki Dead Snake described the chorus as Utada's take on the vocal drop, a dance-music technique that forms melodic phrases from processed vocal samples. He noted that Utada instead sings the entire passage without vocal processing, an approach he considered rare. Chris Cimi of Metropolis argued that Cook's contribution remained within Utada's established style, finding that "One Last Kiss" shared a "spiritual texture" with earlier singles such as "Automatic" and "Traveling".

Dos Monos rapper-producer Zo Zhit highlighted Utada's unexpected syllabic breaks, describing their phrasing as an accomplished fusion of J-pop, R&B, and Japanese-language rhythms. Music producer Yaffle noted that the first chorus ends by suggesting a sub-bass without actually using one, before the bass enters at the start of the second verse. Music critic imdkm found Cook's influence clearest from the middle of the track, when prominent synthesizer textures and vocal cut-ups emerge. He wrote that the arrangement centers Utada's voice and words while using sounds they would seldom pursue alone to create catharsis. Pitchfork critic Joshua Minsoo Kim interpreted the song as an expression of romantic love, with its reverberating synthesizers affirming Utada's boundless affection. Netorabo noted that synth strings from the verse onward create a dramatic build-up, contrasting it with the piano-led ballad "Sakura Nagashi".

Writing for Mikiki, Ryutaro Amano identified Cook's signature sound in the beat, synth bass, and electronic sounds that intensify toward the latter half of the song. Tomohiro Ogawa of Rockin'On Japan wrote that "One Last Kiss" seemed to "transcend time and space", describing its ending as possessing a mysterious, hymn-like quality. He interpreted the song as resisting a pre-programmed "premonition of loss", connecting this theme both to Evangelion and to Utada's previous work, and felt that the track summed up Utada's artistic history. Utada described "One Last Kiss" as an exploration of loss and viewed Evangelion as a story about mourning, the stages of grief, and ways of confronting loss. They said that writing the song led them to understand grief as something they could carry with them rather than leave behind: the pain remained, while what had constituted a loss became a gift. In an interview with Billboard Japan, Utada explained that they generally write lyrics after composing the melody, choosing and placing words around the vowel sounds that emerge during composition. The interviewer highlighted the recurring "a" vowel in "One Last Kiss", which creates a distinctive rhythm without forming exact rhymes; Utada compared their attention to rhyme and tightly structured phrasing to an approach found in rap. Utada also cited the reference to the Louvre in "One Last Kiss" as an example of their use of proper nouns, explaining that such wording is uncommon among singers outside rap.

== Critical reception and accolades ==
In Slant Magazine's ranking of the 50 best albums of 2022, Charles Lyons-Burt described "One Last Kiss" as "simmering" and "gorgeous", calling it a key to Bad Mode's sense of control and its impression of intense emotions contained beneath the surface. Metropolis placed "One Last Kiss" second in its list of the best anime songs of 2021. Darkstorm of Anime UK News called "One Last Kiss" the "cherry on top" of Evangelion: 3.0+1.0 Thrice Upon a Time's music. Rafael Motamayor of SlashFilm called "One Last Kiss" "phenomenal". In an Animate Times roundtable on Evangelion: 3.0+1.0 Thrice Upon a Time, editor Ishibashi praised the use of "One Last Kiss" during the film's final scene as "really beautiful". He also described a persistent, unresolved feeling in the song that led him to listen to it repeatedly. At the J-Wave Special Music Fun! Award 2021, "One Last Kiss" won the Best of Mix (Best Engineer) Award. "One Last Kiss" also received the top prize at the 2021 Reiwa Anisong Awards. The judging panel praised Utada for writing lyrics that accompanied Evangelion's journey and highlighted the emotional impact of hearing the song's introduction. At the 36th Japan Gold Disc Award, "One Last Kiss" was named one of the Best 5 Songs by Download.

== Commercial performance ==
In its first chart week in Japan, "One Last Kiss" debuted atop Oricon's Weekly Digital Singles chart with 72,000 downloads, while the eponymous One Last Kiss EP led the Weekly Digital Albums chart with 21,986 downloads, giving Utada their first simultaneous number ones on the two Oricon digital rankings. On Billboard Japan, the song debuted atop Download Songs with 66,534 downloads; it entered Streaming Songs at number three and the Billboard Japan Hot 100 at number two. The EP simultaneously topped Billboard Japan's Download Albums chart with 19,760 downloads, the highest first-week total among albums released in 2021 at that point. On Oricon's Combined Singles chart, "One Last Kiss" debuted at number two with 57,913 points and subsequently reached number one. Oricon also recorded a peak of number three on its weekly Streaming chart.

Outside Japan, "One Last Kiss" debuted at number 11 on Billboard's World Digital Song Sales chart, marking Utada's eleventh entry on the chart. It peaked at number 40 on the Billboard Global 200. In Taiwan, the song ranked number one on Hit FM's HITO Japanese and Asian chart for the tracking week of March 8–14. During its second week, "One Last Kiss" retained the top position on Oricon's Weekly Digital Singles chart with 32,987 downloads, while the EP remained atop Weekly Digital Albums with 5,399 downloads. Billboard Japan also kept the song at number one on Download Songs with 30,555 downloads, while the EP retained the Download Albums summit with 4,765 downloads. The song rose to number one on the Japan Hot 100, giving Utada their first chart-topper there since "Goodbye Happiness" in December 2010, approximately ten years and four months earlier. That week, it ranked sixth on Billboard Japan's Streaming Songs chart and seventh on Oricon's Streaming chart with 7,852,634 plays.

For a third consecutive week, the song and EP respectively led Oricon's Weekly Digital Singles and Digital Albums charts, making Utada the first solo artist and the second act overall, after Radwimps, to lead both rankings simultaneously for three consecutive weeks. Billboard Japan likewise kept "One Last Kiss" atop Download Songs for a third week, with 19,575 downloads, and the EP led Download Albums for a third week with 2,782 downloads. On the corresponding streaming charts, "One Last Kiss" ranked seventh on both Oricon and Billboard Japan, with Oricon recording 6,163,579 plays; Billboard Japan also placed it at number five on the Japan Hot 100. It ranked eighth on Oricon's Combined Singles chart with 29,082 points. The Recording Industry Association of Japan (RIAJ) certified "One Last Kiss" platinum for downloads in October 2023, denoting at least 250,000 downloads. In August 2025, it received a double-platinum streaming certification, denoting 200 million streams.

== Music video ==
=== Background and concept ===
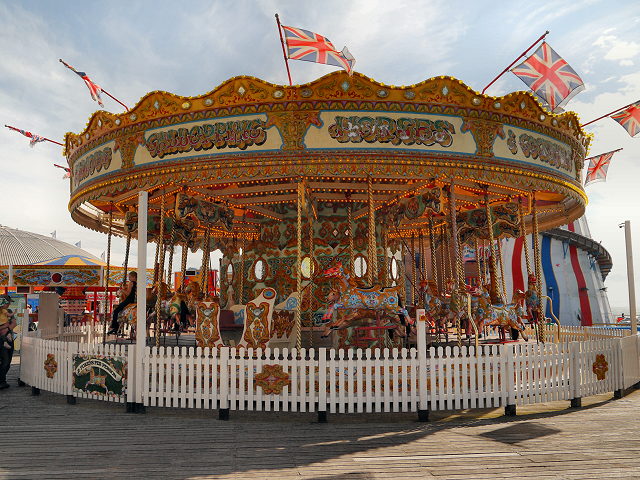
The amusement park at Brighton Palace Pier, which appears in the music video.

Hideaki Anno, the creator, screenwriter, and chief director of Evangelion: 3.0+1.0 Thrice Upon a Time, directed the music video for "One Last Kiss" after Utada approached him about the project. Anno devised a remote workflow in which he remained in Japan and sent Utada brief instructions by email concerning eye contact with the camera and lip-syncing. Utada then filmed with a small crew outside London under COVID-19 precautions, and the footage was sent to Anno and his team in Japan for editing. Contemporary coverage identified Victoria Park in East London and Brighton as filming locations. Utada said that the restrictions limited the shoot to a six-person crew, including themself; they handled their own styling and makeup and also filmed some footage with a smartphone. The footage was captured with several types of equipment, including smartphones.

During a June 2021 conversation with Utada, Anno recalled that he wanted a more private perspective than the initial professional footage provided and asked Utada either to operate the camera personally or to let their child do so. Utada subsequently sent him self-recorded material and footage taken by their five-year-old son. Utada also explained that their son filmed them lying in bed in pajamas with an iPhone, while a cinematographer friend recorded them walking through a nearby park and during a short trip. Utada later wrote that they conceived the video's concept and selected its locations and an Airbnb with their cinematographer friend, while filming also took place at the friend's home and in Utada's own bedroom with assistance from their son. Utada later described the video's premise as footage of memories filmed by an "unforgettable person". The finished video follows Utada through outdoor and domestic settings, including a park, Brighton Palace Pier and its amusement arcade, alongside scenes of them relaxing indoors.

=== Release and reception ===
The music video premiered on YouTube at midnight JST on March 9, 2021. The premiere drew 69,000 concurrent viewers, and the video surpassed one million views within approximately 12 hours. Six days after its premiere, it passed 10 million views. The total exceeded 20 million within 20 days, a pace that Sony Music identified as the fastest for a music video in Utada's career. The video later surpassed 100 million views on YouTube. In OtoToy's "Today's MV" column, Kana Miyoshi highlighted Utada's varied expressions against the song's minimal track. She wrote that shots evoking dormant memories felt emotional when viewed alongside the conclusion of Evangelion, and expected many fans to experience an "unstoppable sense of loss" at the end of the long-running story. At the 2022 Space Shower Music Awards, "One Last Kiss" won Best Conceptual Video.

== Live performances and covers ==
Utada first performed "One Last Kiss" live during the prerecorded streaming concert Hikaru Utada Live Sessions from Air Studios, streamed on January 19, 2022. Rockin'On described the song's opening refrain as dreamlike and marveled at the precision of its live sound. The performance featured Jodi Milliner on synthesizer bass, while Utada controlled vocal samples with a keyboard controller. On April 13, 2024, Utada appeared as the main guest on the first regular episode of Nippon TV's music program with Music, where they gave the song its first television performance and performed "Nijikan Dake no Vacance" with Sheena Ringo. Utada included "One Last Kiss" in the set list of the Hikaru Utada Science Fiction Tour 2024, which ran from July to September 2024. On April 20, 2025, they made a surprise guest appearance during Arca's set at the Coachella Valley Music and Arts Festival. Utada and Arca performed "Electricity (Arca Remix)" and a mash-up of "One Last Kiss" and "Passion". Japanese voice actor Megumi Ogata, who voices Neon Genesis Evangelion character Shinji Ikari, covered "One Last Kiss" for her anime-song cover mini-album Animegu. 30th, released on February 15, 2023. Masaya Haga arranged the cover. Ogata considered Utada a songwriter who creates songs that "only Utada can sing", which led Ogata and her collaborators to consider how to approach "One Last Kiss". She sought to preserve the song's world and as much of Utada's nuance as possible while approaching it from her own perspective, conceiving the cover as a "love letter" to the Evangelion franchise.

== Track listing ==
One Last Kiss Japanese track listing
No.	Title	Length
1.	"One Last Kiss"	4:12
2.	"Beautiful World" (Da Capo version)	5:58
3.	"Beautiful World" (2021 remastered)	5:17
4.	"Beautiful World" (Planitb Acoustica Mix; 2021 remastered)	5:12
5.	"Sakura Nagashi" (桜流し, "Flowing Cherry Blossoms"; 2021 remastered)	4:42
6.	"Fly Me to the Moon (In Other Words)" (2007 mix; 2021 remastered)	3:26
7.	"One Last Kiss" (instrumental)	4:12
8.	"Beautiful World" (Da Capo version instrumental)	5:57
Total length:		38:56

== Personnel ==
Credits adapted from the liner notes of the One Last Kiss LP.

- Hikaru Utada – songwriting, production, vocal recording, all vocals, keyboards, programming
- A. G. Cook – production, keyboards, programming
- Steve Fitzmaurice – recording, mixing (at Pierce Room)
- Jodi Milliner – synth bass
- Yuya Saito – vocal track editing (at ABS Recording)

== Charts ==
Chart performance for One Last Kiss EP
Chart (2021)	Peak position
France (SNEP)	112
Japan Hot Albums (Billboard Japan)	1
Japanese Albums (Oricon)	2
Japanese Combined Albums (Oricon)	1
Scottish Albums (Official Charts)	58
US Album Sales (Billboard)	37
US Current Album Sales (Billboard)	25
US Vinyl Albums (Billboard)	13
US World Albums (Billboard)	12
US Heatseekers Albums (Billboard)	21

Chart (2026)	Peak position
Greek Albums (IFPI)	16

Chart performance for "One Last Kiss" digital single
Chart (2021)	Peak position
Global 200 (Billboard)	40
Japan Hot 100 (Billboard Japan)	1
Japanese Combined Singles (Oricon)	1
US World Digital Song Sales (Billboard)	11

== Certifications ==
Certifications for "One Last Kiss"
Region	Certification	Certified units/sales
Japan (RIAJ)	Platinum	250,000^{*}
Streaming
Japan (RIAJ)	2× Platinum	200,000,000^{†}
^{*} Sales figures based on certification alone.^{†} Streaming-only figures based on certification alone.
