= Hanataba o Kimi ni =

Single by Hikaru Utada

from the album Fantôme
- Released: April 15, 2016
- Recorded: 2016
- Genre: J-pop
- Length: 4:42
- Label: Virgin
- Songwriter: Hikaru Utada
- Producer: Hikaru Utada

Hikaru Utada singles chronology
"Sakura Nagashi" (2012)	"Hanataba o Kimi ni" (2016)	"Manatsu no Tōriame" (2016)

Music video
- "Hanataba o Kimi ni" on YouTube

"Hanataba o Kimi ni" (花束を君に; lit. "A Bouquet For You") is a song by Japanese-American singer-songwriter Hikaru Utada. It was released digitally on April 15 2016, alongside "Manatsu no Tōriame" as joint singles for their ninth studio album Fantôme. The song was the theme to the dorama Toto Neechan. The single is Utada's first release since 2012's Evangelion: 3.0 theme song "Sakura Nagashi", and marks their official comeback to the Japanese music scene.

== Composition ==
"Hanataba o Kimi ni" is a soft J-pop ballad featuring prominent strings, as well as a piano and drums. It is one of their few singles to be completely in Japanese, with no English words in it. Lyrically, it speaks about the appreciation felt for a departed person and symbolically sending them a bouquet to show it. During one verse, they talk about how pain and sorrow were vital for love to exist (If there weren't any of the daily secret pains and loneliness / And there were only fun things / Then we got away without feeling anything like love).

== Commercial reception ==
On April 30, 2016, the song entered Billboard's Japan Hot 100 at number 3, based on strong radio airplay and digital sales. The next week, it rose one place to number 2, which became its peak position on the chart. In its third week the song fell to number 7, then to number 9 and continued to slowly drop down on the chart during the following three months. After 16 weeks, it fell off the chart on the issue dated 20 August, but re-entered the next week at number 64. Boosted by the release of the official music video in early September, "Hanataba o kimi ni" shot up 52 positions from 79 to 27 and then stayed in the top 40 nearly uninterrupted until early November, reaching number 23 shortly after the album's release. It again descended down the charts and stayed in lower positions throughout November and December, but re-entered the top 20 after New Year's Day. It has spent 45 non-consecutive weeks on the Hot 100, over a timespan of more than a year and a half.

The song has received a double-platinum certification by the RIAJ for digital sales in excess of 500,000 copies or more and became the second-highest-selling download single of the year, behind only "Zenzenzense" by Radwimps. In October 2019, it was awarded triple-platinum for exceeding digital sales of 750,000. It thus became their highest-selling download single since 2008's "Prisoner of Love, which was certified Million.

== Track listing ==
All lyrics are written by Hikaru Utada; all music is composed by Hikaru Utada.

Digital version
No.	Title	Length
1.	"Hanataba o Kimi ni (花束を君に)"	4:37

== Credits ==
Credits adapted from Fantôme liner notes.

- Hikaru Utada – vocals, songwriting, production
- Ian Thomas – drums
- Ben Parker – electric bass
- Simon Hale – acoustic piano
- Steve Price – strings recording
- Steve Fitzmaurice – percussion, additional drum programming, recording, mixing
- Darren Heelis – additional engineering, additional drum programming
- Komori Masahito – vocal recording
- Jeremy Murphy – strings recording assistance
- Tom Coyne – mastering

== Release history ==
Region	Date	Format
Japan	April 15, 2016	PC download

== Charts ==
=== Weekly charts ===
Chart	Peak position
Billboard Japan Hot 100	2
Billboard Japan Radio Songs	1

=== Year-end charts ===
Chart (2016)	Peak position
Billboard Japan Hot 100	27
Billboard Japan Radio Songs	10

== Certifications ==
Chart	Amount
RIAJ digital downloads	750,000 (3× Platinum)
RIAJ streaming	100,000,000 (Platinum)
