= Sakura Nagashi =

2012 single by Utada Hikaru

- Digital single cover, illustrated by Neon Genesis Evangelion character designer Yoshiyuki Sadamoto

Single by Hikaru Utada

from the album Fantôme
- Released: November 17, 2012
- Recorded: 2012
- Studio: Bunkamura Studio
- Genre: J-pop; pop-rock
- Length: 4:42
- Label: EMI Music Japan
- Songwriters: Hikaru Utada, Paul Carter
- Producer: Hikaru Utada

Hikaru Utada singles chronology
"Goodbye Happiness" (2010)	"Sakura Nagashi" (2012)	"Hanataba o Kimi ni" (2016)

Alternative cover
- DVD single cover

Music video
- "Sakura Nagashi" on YouTube

"Sakura Nagashi" (桜流し; lit. 'Flowing Cherry Blossoms/Cherry Blossoms Sinking') is a song by Japanese-American singer-songwriter Hikaru Utada. Utada recorded the song as the theme for Evangelion: 3.0 You Can (Not) Redo (2012), the third film in the Rebuild of Evangelion series. EMI Music Japan issued it digitally on November 17, 2012, during Utada's hiatus from music, followed by a DVD single on December 26. Utada wrote the lyrics and co-composed the music with British songwriter Paul Carter, developing the song over approximately one year. Built around piano and strings before expanding with drums, guitar, and bass, "Sakura Nagashi" addresses loss and permanent separation. Although Utada received the film's screenplay, they deliberately avoided learning its narrative and wrote the lyrics in response to their own thoughts and feelings rather than its plot.

Music critics praised "Sakura Nagashi" for its emotional weight, lyrical expression, and gradually intensifying arrangement. The song peaked at number two on the Billboard Japan Hot 100, topped the Billboard Japan Hot Animation chart for three consecutive weeks, and reached number ten on the US Billboard World Digital Song Sales chart. The Recording Industry Association of Japan (RIAJ) later certified it double platinum for 500,000 digital downloads. "Sakura Nagashi" received its first CD release on Utada's sixth Japanese-language studio album, Fantôme (2016), and a 2021 remaster subsequently appeared on the One Last Kiss EP.

== Background and composition ==
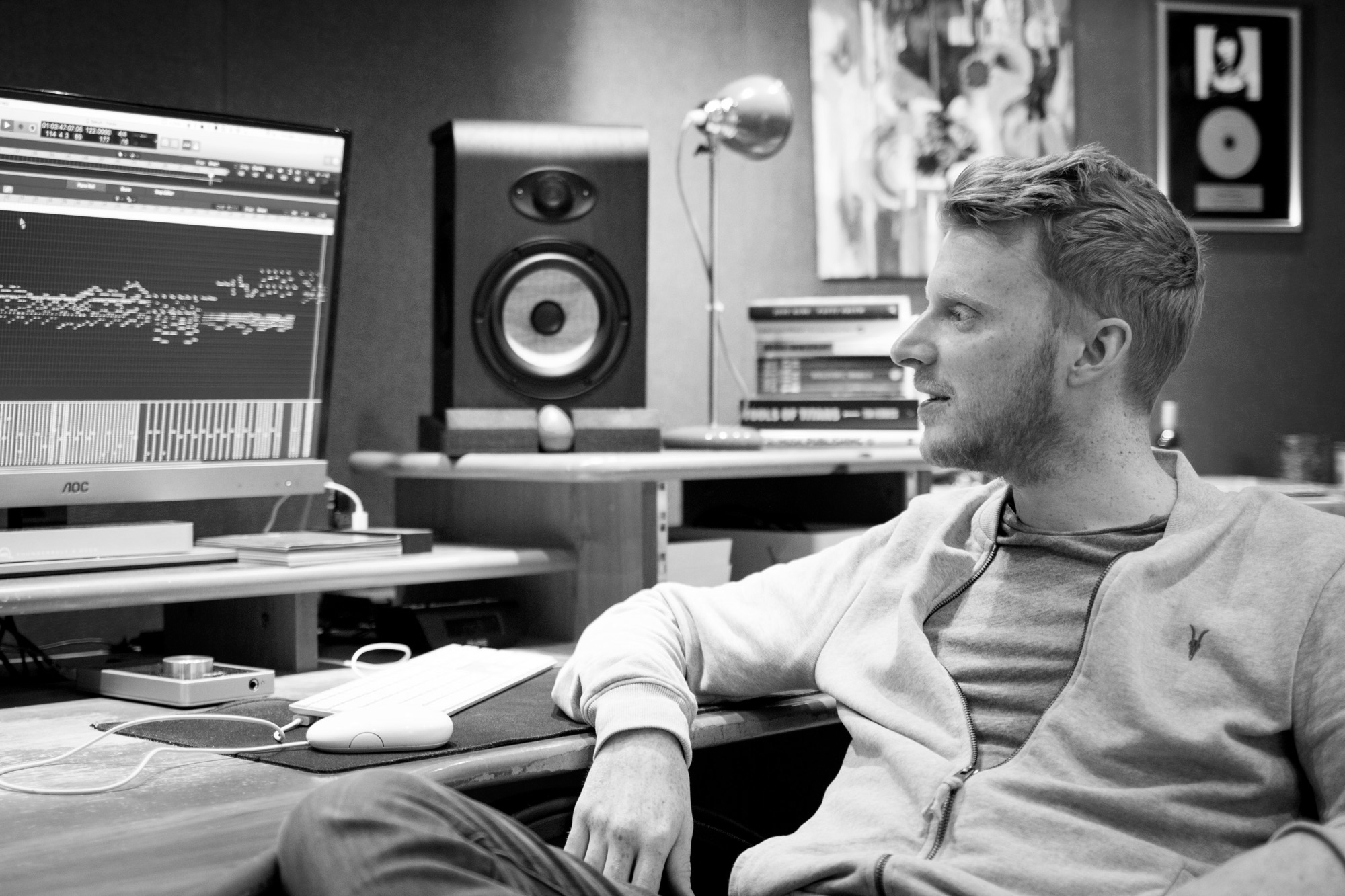
Paul Carter (pictured) co-composed "Sakura Nagashi" with Utada; the song originated from a piano motif he devised during one of their jam sessions.

Following the digital release of "Goodbye Happiness" in November 2010, Utada began their indefinite "human activities" hiatus at the end of the year, a period in which they suspended their activities as an artist to focus on personal growth. During this period, Utada wrote "Sakura Nagashi" at the film staff's request and because of their personal attachment to Evangelion. Utada's involvement with Evangelion dated back to 2006, when they discussed their strong affinity with the series in an interview for Weekly Playboy. Director Hideaki Anno and the production staff read the interview and subsequently asked Utada to write the theme song for Evangelion: 1.0 You Are (Not) Alone (2007), the first installment of the Rebuild of Evangelion film series. The resulting song, "Beautiful World", served as the film's theme song. Utada remained involved with the series for the second installment, Evangelion: 2.0 You Can (Not) Advance (2009), which used the acoustic remix "Beautiful World (Planitb Acoustica Mix)" as its theme song. On August 26, 2011, Comic Natalie reported that the third Rebuild of Evangelion film, then referred to as Q Quickening, would open in Japan in fall 2012. The identity of Q's ending theme remained undisclosed until the film's release. When Evangelion: 3.0 You Can (Not) Redo opened on November 17, 2012, "Sakura Nagashi" was revealed as its ending theme, marking Utada's first new song in two years.

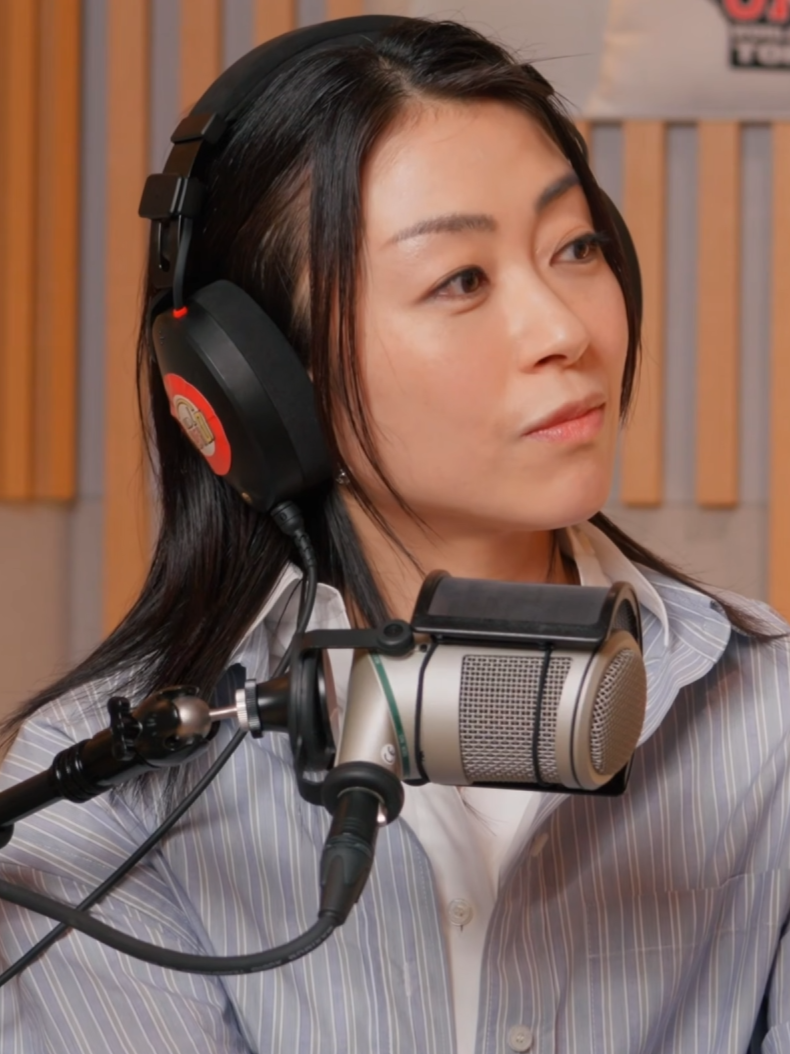
Hikaru Utada in 2026; they wrote the lyrics to "Sakura Nagashi" and co-composed the music.

Utada recalled that they received the offer for the film shortly after the 2011 Tōhoku earthquake and tsunami. When they began writing "Sakura Nagashi", their thoughts inevitably turned to the earthquake. In the DVD single's liner notes, Utada recalled Anno's words when he offered them the theme song: "If one is an artist, one simply cannot create a work while turning one's eyes away from this disaster". Sharing his sentiment, Utada accepted the offer. Utada composed the melody and chords before writing the lyrics, which they said they could only write at the end of the songwriting process. For the earlier Rebuild of Evangelion theme songs, including "Sakura Nagashi", Utada composed after receiving only a general outline of each film's plot. Concerned that the song's musical style might clash with the world of Evangelion: 3.0 You Can (Not) Redo, they obtained its screenplay but deliberately skimmed it to avoid spoilers, reading only superficially enough to leave the story unclear. Anno had asked Utada not to follow the film's narrative, but instead to express what they personally thought and felt at the time. Utada therefore wrote the lyrics without knowing how the film's narrative would unfold.

Utada began writing "Sakura Nagashi" in September 2011 and completed it a year later. Tomoyuki Mori of Real Sound and critic Shunsuke Sugita both connected "Sakura Nagashi" to major changes in Utada's personal life, including the death of their mother, remarriage, and childbirth, with Mori suggesting that the emotions arising from these experiences underlay the song. Utada co-composed the music with their friend Paul Carter, a difficult collaboration for Utada, who described working with another songwriter as a challenge but felt that the process developed naturally. Carter recalled that the collaboration originated during a jam session in London, when he devised the song's main motif on piano; he said that it emerged almost fully formed on his first attempt, along with some of the more intricate passages later in the song, particularly in the piano's left hand. Several months later, Utada told him about the offer to write the theme for Q and proposed developing the piece for the film. The pair worked back and forth on the song for approximately a year, although Carter recalled that only one chord changed between their initial voice-note recording and the finished composition. He instead identified Utada's process of determining what they wanted to express lyrically as the most time-consuming part of its development. Utada and Carter also collaborated on the track's programming, retaining elements from their demos in the final recording, while Carter wrote some of the string parts that Utada subsequently had recorded. Carter's piano was among the first parts recorded, and he recalled that the rest of the arrangement was then built around it. He performed the part in London using a sampled virtual piano instrument, which he then modified.

== Music and lyrics ==
"Sakura Nagashi"
"Sakura Nagashi"
An excerpt from the song, illustrating its climactic build with strings, drums, and guitar.

Musically, "Sakura Nagashi" centers on piano and a dense string arrangement, with LisAni! characterizing its development as dynamic. Yamaha Music Data Shop characterized the song as a refined slow number and classified it as J-pop. The arrangement opens with a minimalist texture built around a simple keyboard arpeggio before adding strings and guitar. Drums enter toward the end as the arrangement builds toward its climax, while increasingly frequent snare strikes create tension. Animate Times editor Kota Iwasaki characterized the first half of "Sakura Nagashi" as quiet and ballad-like, contrasting it with a dynamic second half in which drums and guitar build in intensity, a progression he described as "overwhelming". Rag Music highlighted the song's expansive piano and string arrangement and its dynamic use of solid-sounding guitar, which it described as giving the song a sense of narrative progression. The publication recommended "Sakura Nagashi" to listeners who enjoy the grandiose style of rock associated with Coldplay and Sigur Rós. Writing for Real Sound, Takumi Nakamura described "Sakura Nagashi" as the song on Utada's album Fantôme whose arrangement most closely resembles that of a band. He highlighted the guitar that runs from the pre-chorus into the chorus and a bass drum that enters after the second verse, likening the latter's sound to a rumble from the ground. Musician Ikuta Kobayashi identified "Sakura Nagashi" as an example of Utada's distinctive sense of groove, attributing it to their sensitive rhythmic phrasing and use of breath as a rhythmic element. He observed that Utada could create a Western-influenced rhythmic expression in Japanese through subtle variations in pronunciation and the placement of syllables, without making the language sound like English.

Shinji Hyogo of Rockin'On Japan identified permanent separation as a central theme of "Sakura Nagashi" and observed that its sound anticipated the direction Utada later pursued in other songs. Discussing the recurring line "Everybody finds love in the end", critic Shunsuke Sugita questioned the extraordinary conviction behind the idea that everyone could ultimately find love even after losses as profound as the death of a partner or a young child. Sugita interpreted the song as one of Utada's responses to the 2011 Tōhoku earthquake, describing it as an extreme expression of the sense of prayer and faith that they had cultivated over the course of their work. Kōji Shimizu of encore likewise read the song in relation to the earthquake, viewing its lyrics as an expression of permanent separation. UtaTen characterized "Sakura Nagashi" as ballad-like throughout and identified life and death, loss and rebirth, eternity and separation as its principal themes. The publication observed that the song balances these weighty subjects with lighter sounds that convey a sense of hope, specifically highlighting its piano melody. The First Times interpreted the lyrics as quietly contemplating life and death while confronting the loss of a loved one. The publication viewed the song as recognizing grief as a consequence of love and the memory of having deeply loved someone as a source of renewed strength. Writing for Mikiki, musician and producer Tofubeats described the latter half of "Sakura Nagashi" as cathartic, observing that its effect changed when heard in the context of Fantôme. Animate Times editor Yūki Ota viewed "Sakura Nagashi" and Utada's other theme songs for Evangelion as addressing the series' viewers rather than directly reflecting the works themselves, noting a sense of distance between the songs and the series. Voice actress Mariya Ise offered a different interpretation of Utada's Evangelion songs, saying that she had long wondered from whose perspective their lyrics were written. She personally read the lyrics as expressing Gendo Ikari's perspective.

== Release ==
EMI Music Japan released "Sakura Nagashi" exclusively as a digital single on November 17, 2012, followed by a DVD single on December 26. The DVD contained Naomi Kawase's music video rather than an audio release of the single, alongside a booklet featuring comments from Utada and Kawase. First-press copies also included a B2 poster featuring an original illustration by Neon Genesis Evangelion character designer Yoshiyuki Sadamoto. The same month, the song's digital release expanded internationally to more than 100 countries across North America, Europe, and Asia. The Evangelion: 3.0 You Can (Not) Redo DVD and Blu-ray editions, released on April 24, 2013, included the song on the first-press bonus CD Evangelion: 3.0 You Can (Not) Redo Original Soundtrack. "Sakura Nagashi" received its first CD release on Utada's studio album Fantôme, released on September 28, 2016. A 2021 remaster of "Sakura Nagashi" later appeared on Utada's EP One Last Kiss, released digitally on March 9, 2021, and physically the following day.

== Live performances and covers ==
On September 19, 2016, Utada performed "Sakura Nagashi" on the 30th-anniversary special Music Station Ultra Fes 2016. The broadcast marked Utada's first television performance following their return to music and the first live rendition of "Sakura Nagashi". The appearance also marked Utada's first appearance on Japanese terrestrial television in approximately five and a half years. During the program, Utada discussed their hiatus and the creation of "Sakura Nagashi" with host Tamori before performing it. On November 21, 2012, co-composer Paul Carter released a piano-version promotional video for "Sakura Nagashi", featuring his solo performance of the song and footage of the piano's internal mechanisms moving as he played. Hatena News contrasted its subdued atmosphere with that of the original music video. In 2017, voice actress Megumi Ogata, who voices Shinji Ikari in the Evangelion franchise, covered "Sakura Nagashi" for her anime-song cover album Animeg. 25th, released by Lantis on October 11. The album comprised songs associated with anime productions in which Ogata had performed, with "Sakura Nagashi" appearing as its tenth track. Ogata had wanted to include the song from the beginning of the project, but obtaining permission took longer than expected; its inclusion was eventually announced as the final ¥25 million stretch goal of the album's crowdfunding campaign. Tomohiro Nakatsuchi arranged the cover. Ogata considered the original recording's piano groove impossible to reproduce even with a highly skilled pianist.

== Music video and promotion ==
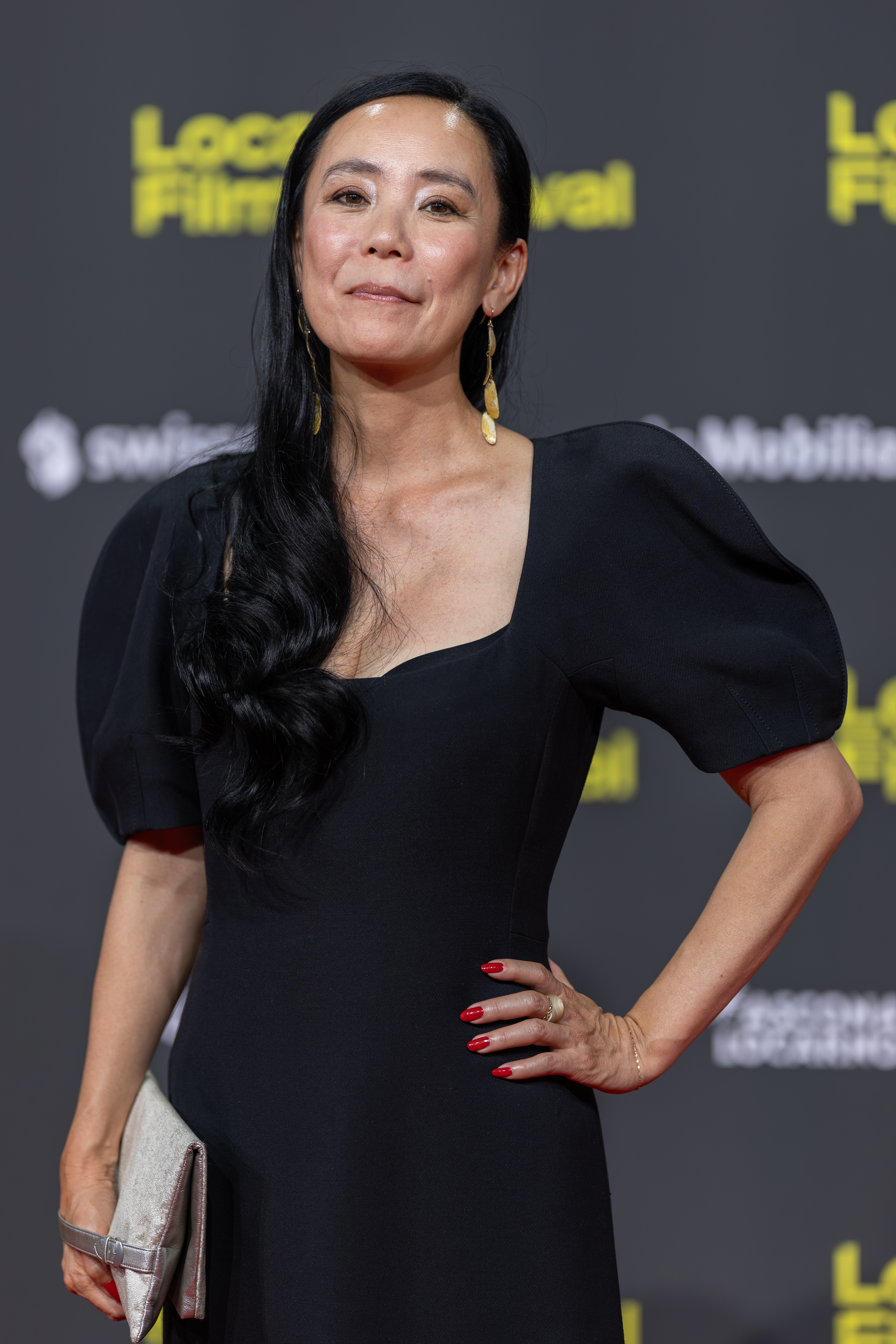
Filmmaker Naomi Kawase directed the original music video for "Sakura Nagashi".

The music video for "Sakura Nagashi", directed by filmmaker Naomi Kawase, premiered in full on YouTube on November 17, 2012, for a limited three-day period ending at midnight on November 19; it also appeared on a dedicated promotional website for the song. The video surpassed one million views on YouTube within 24 hours; by 1:00 p.m. on November 18, it had reached approximately 1.3 million views. Within its first two days, the full-length video accumulated two million views on YouTube, reaching the milestone faster than any previous Utada video. After the full-length version's limited release ended, a short version remained available online; commercial distribution of the music video through iTunes, RecoChoku, and other services began on November 28. Kawase conceived the video around the theme of "motherhood". Utada and Kawase developed the video through repeated discussions, while Kawase sought to express the theme through universal yet distinctly Japanese scenery and to convey the importance of cherishing what is close at hand. Utada's staff also launched a dedicated website for the song and invited listeners to share their reactions using the hashtag #SakuraNagashi.

In September 2016, Studio Khara created a new music video for "Sakura Nagashi" to commemorate the release of Fantôme, with Hibiki Yoshizaki as director. The full-length version became available on YouTube for one day only, on September 19. Despite its one-day availability, the video accumulated more than 1.4 million views. In response to fan requests, the full-length version became available again from September 28 until noon on October 3. Yoshizaki had previously worked on Evangelion: 3.0 You Can (Not) Redo and directed animated music videos including the Japan Animator Expo short "Me!Me!Me!" At the time of the video's release, Yoshizaki said that he wanted viewers to experience the song alongside the world of Evangelion: 3.0. Yoshizaki later recalled that Khara commissioned the video to commemorate Utada's return to music in 2016 and selected him as director because of his experience with music videos. Rather than simply reusing footage from Evangelion: 3.0, he recreated some of its scenes specifically for the video, introducing subtle differences from their counterparts in the film. The video later screened at Studio Khara's 10th Anniversary Exhibition, which opened at the Laforet Museum Harajuku on November 23.

== Critical reception ==
Kai-You regarded the track as one of the essential songs associated with the Rebuild of Evangelion series. Kevin Petrement of Journal du Japon described it as widely regarded as one of Utada's greatest works, and later argued that Fantôme lacked a new masterpiece on its level. Shinjii Hyogo of Spice considered the inclusion of "Sakura Nagashi", "Hanataba o Kimi ni", and "Manatsu no Tōriame" sufficient to set considerable expectations for Fantôme. Barks characterized the song as a "poignant and beautiful requiem for life" imbued with literary elegance, distinguishing it from Utada's themes for the previous two Rebuild of Evangelion films. Vassilios Karagiannis of OndaRock found its drumming "fairly interesting". Upon its release, Fukushima of Rockin'On Japan called it a "grand yet intimate requiem" and wrote that its latter half moved him to tears, while Amanda Walujono of Audrey Magazine included it as a bonus selection on her list of Utada's top five songs, describing it as "simply exquisite". Dan Barnett of UK Anime Network deemed it a "solid" theme song but weaker than those Utada had recorded for the previous Rebuild of Evangelion films.

== Commercial performance ==
Upon its release, "Sakura Nagashi" reached number one on the iTunes Top Songs chart within two hours and 50 minutes, the fastest that an Utada song had reached the position at the time. Across iTunes, RecoChoku, and other digital retailers, it accumulated 100,000 downloads on November 17 and 18, giving Utada their fastest initial download sales since "Flavor of Life -Ballad Version-". Following the song's unveiling, "Sakura Nagashi" and "Hikaru Utada" occupied the top two positions among Yahoo! Japan's trending keywords. "Sakura Nagashi" debuted at number one on RecoChoku's daily singles chart. On the Billboard Japan Hot 100, it debuted at number four and rose to a peak of number two the following week. It topped the Billboard Japan Hot Animation chart for three consecutive weeks. By early December, it had spent 12 consecutive days atop the iTunes Top Songs chart, reached number one on 22 other digital services, including RecoChoku, and surpassed 250,000 downloads. Despite its November 17 release, "Sakura Nagashi" ranked fifth on the iTunes Best of 2012 year-end Top Songs chart. It also peaked at number ten on the US Billboard World Digital Song Sales chart. The DVD single debuted at number four on Japan's overall DVD chart, selling 20,681 copies in its first week. It sold a further 4,770 copies the following week, bringing its reported total to 25,451. In 2016, "Sakura Nagashi" attracted renewed attention after appearing on Utada's album Fantôme and receiving a new music video. Hitoshi Kurimoto of Billboard Japan attributed its rise to number six on the Japan Hot Animation chart in part to activity on Twitter and radio airplay. In July 2018, the Recording Industry Association of Japan (RIAJ) certified the single double platinum for 500,000 digital downloads.

== Personnel ==
Credits adapted from One Last Kiss EP liner notes

- Utada Hikaru – music, words, vocals, programming, string arrangement
- Paul Carter – music, piano, programming, string arrangement
- Atsushi Matsui – recording
- Goetz B. – mixing
- Kei Kawano – band leader, conductor, string arrangement
- Takumi Ogasawara – drums
- Tsuyoshi Kon – electric guitar
- Takeshi Taneda – electric bass
- Mamiko Amemiya – strings leader

== Track listing ==
All lyrics are written by Hikaru Utada; all music is composed by Hikaru Utada and Paul Carter.

Digital version
No.	Title	Length
1.	"Sakura Nagashi (桜流し; Flowing Cherry Blossoms)"	4:42
2.	"Sakura Nagashi (Instrumental) (桜流し; Flowing Cherry Blossoms)"	4:41

DVD version
No.	Title	Length
1.	"Sakura Nagashi (桜流し)" (music video)	-:--

== Charts and certifications ==
=== Weekly charts ===
Chart (2012)	Peak position
Billboard Japan Hot 100	2
Billboard Japan Adult Contemporary Airplay	2
Billboard Japan Hot Animation	1
US Billboard World Digital Song Sales	10
Oricon Music DVD Weekly Chart	3
Oricon DVD Sōgō Weekly Chart	4

Chart (2016)	Peak position
Billboard Japan Hot 100	15

=== Year-end chart ===
Chart (2013)	Position
Billboard Japan Hot 100	52

=== Certifications and sales ===
Certification	Units
RIAJ digital downloads	500,000 (2× Platinum)
