= Manatsu no Tōriame =

Single by Hikaru Utada

from the album Fantôme
- Released: April 15, 2016
- Recorded: 2016
- Genre: J-pop
- Length: 5:41
- Label: Virgin
- Songwriter: Hikaru Utada
- Producer: Hikaru Utada

Hikaru Utada singles chronology
"Hanataba o Kimi ni" (2016)	"Manatsu no Tōriame" (2016)	"Michi" (2016)

Music video
- "Manatsu no Tōriame" on YouTube

"Manatsu no Tōriame" (真夏の通り雨; lit. "Midsummer Shower") is a song by Japanese-American singer-songwriter Hikaru Utada. It was released digitally on April 15, 2016, alongside "Hanataba o Kimi ni" as joint singles for their ninth studio album Fantôme. The song is the theme to NTV's news show News Zero. The single is Utada's first release since 2012's Evangelion: 3.0 theme song "Sakura Nagashi", and marks their official comeback to the Japanese music scene.

== Track listing ==
All lyrics are written by Hikaru Utada; all music is composed by Hikaru Utada.

Digital version
No.	Title	Length
1.	"Manatsu no Tōriame (真夏の通り雨)"	5:38

== Credits ==
Credits adapted from Fantôme liner notes.

- Hikaru Utada – vocals, songwriting, production, string arrangement, programming
- Tamada Tom – drums
- Yamaguchi Hiroo – electric bass
- Kawano Kei – band leader, conductor, acoustic piano
- Suhara Anzu – strings leader
- Darren Heelis – synth bass
- Tom Coyne – mastering
- Steve Fitzmaurice – recording, mixing, additional drum programming
- Komori Masahito – vocal recording
- Darren Heelis – additional engineering, additional drum programming
- Matsui Atsushi – recording

== Release history ==
Region	Date	Format
Japan	April 15, 2016	PC download

== Charts ==
=== Weekly and monthly charts ===
Chart	Peak position
Billboard Japan Hot 100	5
JpopAsia Music Video Chart	1

=== Certifications ===
Chart	Amount
RIAJ digital downloads	250,000 (Platinum)
