= Shine (Mary-Jess Leaverland album) =

Studio album by Mary-Jess Leaverland
- Released: 8 August 2011
- Recorded: 2010–11
- Genre: Pop; classical crossover; filmic oriental pop
- Length: 48:18
- Label: Decca
- Producer: Ross Cullum

Mary-Jess Leaverland chronology
Shine (2011)	Prayer to a Snowflake (2016)

Singles from Shine
- 1. "Are You The Way Home?" Released: 17 April 2011; 2. "Glorious" Released: 26 June 2011; 3. "Heaven Is Empty" Released: 29 July 2011

Professional ratings
Review scores
Source	Rating
AllMusic	3.5/5 stars
Daily Express	4/5 stars
Subba-Culture	6/10 stars
Sunday Mercury	(Positive)

Shine is the debut studio album by the English classical crossover singer-songwriter Mary-Jess Leaverland. It was originally released in August 2011, on the label Decca. The album follows her victory on Chinese television talent contest Min Xing Chang Fan Tian in December 2009. Leaverland described the album's sound as a "True hybrid between Classical and Pop with a filmic element and an Oriental thread".

== Release history ==
The album's debut single, "Are You the Way Home?" was released on 17 April 2011, and was co-written by Leaverland herself and English singer-songwriter Helen Boulding. One week prior to the release of second single "Glorious", Leaverland released a four-track EP of the same name which featured both singles; the Min Xing Chang Fan Tian winner's song, "Yue Guang Ai Ren (A Love Before Time)"; and an album track, "Stand as One". The third single "Heaven Is Empty" was released onto iTunes on 29 July 2011. The album peaked at #57 in the UK. Shine won both 'Best Newcomer' and 'Best Album' from classical-crossover.co.uk and was awarded many 5 star reviews.

== Track listing ==
Standard edition
No.	Title	Writer(s)	Length
1.	"Are You the Way Home?"	Mary-Jess Leaverland; Helen Boulding; Peter Glenister	3:57
2.	"Glorious"	Leaverland; Chris Eaton	4:14
3.	"Lighthouse of Mine"	Frederik Kempe; Peter Kvinte; Virginia McGrail	4:18
4.	"Rising from the Fire"	Matt Schwartz; Emma Rohan	5:02
5.	"Beautiful Force"	Leaverland; Paddy Dalton; Duck Blackwell	3:33
6.	"Everything Can Wait"	Boulding; Martin Glover; Zoë Pollock	3:41
7.	"Stand as One"	Leaverland; Rohan; Paul Carter	3:45
8.	"Yue Guang Ai Ren (A Love Before Time)"	Tan Dun	3:16
9.	"My Own Sunrise"	Leaverland; Eaton	4:52
10.	"An Angel Walking"	Leaverland; Boulding; Ross Cullum; Geoff Lawson	3:48
11.	"Burning Love"	Leaverland; Boulding; Guy Farley	3:46
12.	"Heaven Is Empty"	Paul Carter	4:02
Total length:			48:18
