= Michi (Hikaru Utada song) =

Single by Hikaru Utada

from the album Fantôme
- Released: September 16, 2016
- Recorded: 2016
- Genre: J-pop, Dance
- Length: 3:36
- Label: Virgin
- Songwriter: Hikaru Utada
- Producer: Hikaru Utada

Hikaru Utada singles chronology
"Manatsu no Tōriame" (2016)	"Michi" (2016)	"Ōzora de Dakishimete" (2017)

"Michi" (道; lit. "Road") is a song by Japanese-American singer-songwriter Hikaru Utada. It was released on Japanese radio stations on September 13, 2016, and digitally on September 16, 2016.

== Background and composition ==
"Michi" is an up-tempo J-pop song with an arrangement made entirely out of electronic synthesizers and drums. Apart from a few anglicisms and three lines in its chorus, it is completely in Japanese. It features an optimistic melody, while its lyrics talk about the singer walking a "lonely road", even though they couldn't feel completely alone, as the memory of the person they lost is still with them and guiding them through dark times. In an interview, Utada explained that it is a "danceable" song, meant to "reiterate that they are doing okay" after the loss of their mother Keiko Fuji to suicide in 2013. Bradley Stern from pop music website MuuMuse found "Michi" surprising, compared to the more "muted tone" of the previously released singles from Fantôme; instead playing like "a continuation of 2010's "Goodbye Happiness", even down to similar-sounding melodies".

== Track listing ==
All lyrics are written by Hikaru Utada; all music is composed by Hikaru Utada.

Digital version
No.	Title	Length
1.	"Michi (道)"	3:35

== Release history ==
Region	Date	Format
Japan	September 13, 2016	Radio airplay
Japan	September 16, 2016	PC download

== Charts ==
=== Weekly charts ===
Chart (2016)	Peak position
Billboard Japan Hot 100	5
Billboard Japan Radio Songs	1

=== Year-end charts ===
Chart (2016)	Peak position
Billboard Japan Hot 100	66
Billboard Japan Radio Songs	4

== Certifications ==
Chart	Amount
RIAJ digital downloads	250,000 (Platinum)
RIAJ streaming	100,000,000 (Platinum)
