= Rich Parker =

British professional vert skater (born 1987)

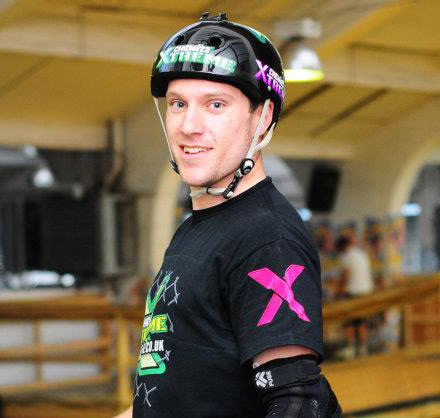
- Parker in 2012

Personal information
- Nationality: British
- Born: Richard Parker; 5 February 1987 (age 39) Birmingham, United Kingdom
- Occupation: Professional Rollerblader

Sport
- Sport: Vert skating
- Partner: Mary-Jess Leaverland
Medal record
Competitions
Representing United Kingdom
Silver medal – second place	2011 Shanghai, China	Vert
Gold medal – first place	2011 Rotterdam, Netherlands	Vert
Silver medal – second place	2011 Barcelona, Spain	Vert
Gold medal – first place	2012 Copenhagen, Denmark	Vert
Gold medal – first place	2013 European Championship	Vert
Silver medal – second place	2014 Bulgaria	Vert
Gold medal – first place	2015 Rome, Italy	Vert
Gold medal – first place	2017 European Championship	Vert

Rich Parker (born 5 February 1987 in Birmingham) is a British professional vert skater. Parker started skating when he was ten years old in 1997 and turned professional in 2004, at the age of 17. He has attended many competitions in his vert skating career, regularly competing on the pro tour. Since becoming professional, Rich has produced an impressive competitive record, including an Asian X-Games Silver medal as well as winning the European Championships for three consecutive years. Rich Parker still remains the number one ranked halfpipe inline skater in the United Kingdom.

Best Tricks: Flatspin 900, 1080, 1260.

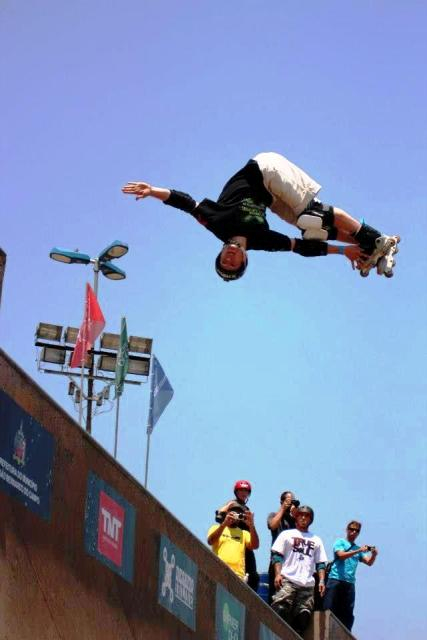
Rich Vert Skating

== Vert Competitions ==
- 2017 – European Champion – (1st)
- 2016 – British Champion – (1st)
- 2016 – NASS, England – (1st)
- 2016 – Bunker, Italy – (1st)
- 2015 – NL Contest, France – (2nd)
- 2015 – ICR, Italy – (2nd)
- 2015 – X Masters, Italy – (1st)
- 2015 – NASS, England – (3rd)
- 2014 – MSS, Bulgaria – (2nd)
- 2014 – Roll Line, England – (1st)
- 2013 – European Champion – (1st)
- 2012 – Asian X Games, Shanghai, China – (4th)
- 2012 – NL Contest, Strasbourg, France – (1st)
- 2012 – Chewits Xtreme Inline Open, Birmingham – (1st)
- 2012 – European Championship Halfpipe, Copenhagen, Denmark – (1st)
- 2012 – King of Warriors 2, Barcelona, Spain – (1st)
- 2012 – ProRad, São Paulo, Brazil – (3rd)
- 2011 – Asian X Games, Shanghai, China – (2nd)
- 2011 – European Championships, Rotterdam, Netherlands – (1st)
- 2011 – King of Warriors, Barcelona, Spain – (2nd)
- 2006 – LG Action Sports World Championships, Dallas, TX, USA – (6th)
- 2006 – LG Action Sports World Tour, Amsterdam, Netherlands – (7th)
- 2005 – LG Action Sports World Championship, Manchester, England – (6th)
