= Nijikan Dake no Vacance =

"Nijikan Dake no Bakansu"

Promotional single by Hikaru Utada featuring Sheena Ringo

from the album Fantôme
- Released: September 16, 2016 (Radio airplay)
- Recorded: 2016
- Genre: J-pop, rock
- Length: 4:42
- Label: Virgin; Universal Japan
- Songwriter: Hikaru Utada
- Producer: Hikaru Utada

Music video
- "Nijikan Dake no Bakansu" on YouTube

"Nijikan Dake no Bakansu" (二時間だけのバカンス; lit. "A Two Hour Vacation") is a song by Japanese-American singer-songwriter Hikaru Utada, featuring guest vocals by Sheena Ringo. A corresponding music video was released on September 16, 2016, and the song was sent to radio stations as well, to promote the release of their ninth studio album Fantôme.

== Background and composition ==
The two singers had previously collaborated on Ringo's 2003 album Utaite Myōri: Sono Ichi, singing The Carpenters' classic "I Won't Last a Day Without You".

Written and composed by Utada, it is a J-pop song with influences from 1970's Italian pop music. "A Two Hour Vacation", as it translates, talks about the singers' need to escape every once in a while from daily life ("I love the sweet, everyday life / But the thrills are looking for me"). They admit that it is even best to escape just for a short time ("It's fine if it isn't enough / Fun is best a little at a time"), meet more regularly ("Greed will ruin you / Tell me, when is next time?") and how it is healthy to even "skip class" sometimes to "walk together in the park" instead.

== Live performances ==
Utada and Shiina performed the song for the first time live on the Nippon TV music show With Music on April 13, 2024 as part of the former's promotions for their third compilation album Science Fiction.

== Credits ==
- Lyrics by Hikaru Utada; music by Hikaru Utada
- Guest vocals by Sheena Ringo
- Produced by Hikaru Utada
- Arranged by Hikaru Utada

== Release history ==
Region	Date	Format
Japan	September 16, 2016	Airplay
Worldwide	September 28, 2016	Digital download

== Charts ==
=== Weekly charts ===
Chart	Peak position
Billboard Japan Hot 100	23
Billboard Japan Radio Songs	7

=== Year-end charts ===
Chart (2016)	Peak position
iTunes Japan Year-End Singles Chart	153
