= Richard Davies Parker =

American professor of criminal justice

Richard D. Parker
- Born: 1945 (age 80–81)
- Education: Swarthmore College (BA); Harvard University (LLB)
- Occupation: Law professor
- Years active: 1974–present
- Known for: Constitutional populism

Richard Davies Parker (born 1945) is an American legal scholar who serves as the Paul W. Williams Professor of Criminal Justice at Harvard Law School, where he has taught constitutional law and criminal law since 1974. He also serves as chairman of the Citizens Flag Alliance, an American nonprofit organization dedicated to advancing a constitutional amendment that would protect the American flag against acts of physical desecration.

Parker is best known as a proponent of constitutional populism, or the view that interpretation of the United States Constitution should conform to the values of the majority. He is the author of ''Here the People Rule": A Constitutional Populist Manifesto, in which he calls for a reorientation of constitutional law "to promote, not limit, the expression of ordinary political energy—thus to extend, rather than constrain, majority rule."

== Biography ==
=== Academic career ===
Parker graduated from Swarthmore College in 1967 and Harvard Law School in 1970. During his undergraduate years, he worked for New York Senator Robert F. Kennedy. After graduating from Harvard, Parker clerked for Judge J. Skelly Wright of the United States Court of Appeals for the District of Columbia Circuit from 1970 to 1971 and Justice Potter Stewart of the United States Supreme Court from 1971 to 1972. He subsequently worked as an attorney at the Children's Defense Fund and began teaching at Harvard Law School in 1974.

=== Personal life ===
In January 2009, Parker, a mountain hiker, underwent surgery for cervical decompression and fusion, from which he awoke paralyzed with tetraplegia, partially a result of doctors’ failure to monitor electrical signals in his spine. He chooses not to identify as disabled, but instead approaches his condition with patience, a rebellious mindset, and denial.

== Legal philosophy and views ==
=== Constitutional populism ===
Parker's constitutional populist legal philosophy is influenced by legal realism and his experiences in the 1960s with the civil rights and Vietnam anti-war movements. In 1981, his first major law review publication, The Past of Constitutional Theory—And its Future, appealed to members of his generation to reject prevailing justifications for judicial power, which he considered "self-imposed orthodoxy" in constitutional theory that produced a "conservative, apologetic orientation." In its place, he envisioned for a political life "far more democratic" than conventional constitutional theory then sanctioned. Professor Lee Strang subsequently characterized this appeal as "arguably the first modern call for scholarship in the vein of popular constitutionalism."

In 1994, Parker authored "Here the People Rule": A Constitutional Populist Manifesto, the book for which he is best known. In it, he offers two competing "takes" on Thomas Mann’s politically-inspired novella Mario and the Magician, "Populist" and "Anti-Populist," to question the "sensibilities" of constitutional law, or assumptions about the attitudes and political energy of ordinary people. Parker contends that the Anti-Populist sensibility, which views the political energy of ordinary people as defective and potentially dangerous, prevails in conventional constitutional law discourse. This can be seen through a pretentious emphasis on methodology and abstract judicial reasoning that ultimately ensure the lack of participation by everyday citizens. Parker then questions the suppositions that the majority's view rules in the United States and that the judiciary's role properly protects minorities from supposed majoritarian tyranny. He contends that an elite minority of judges control the bounds of constitutional discourse, threatening the majority's ability to make constitutional law. His Populist alternative would see ordinary people "deflate" legal discourse of its appeals to "higher law" and instead center constitutional argumentation on "political controversy about democracy." Rejecting judicial qualifications such as intellectual ability, scholarship, and technical proficiency, Parker contends that respect for the judiciary should depend upon judges’ ability to "speak to the ordinariness in others," concluding that "ordinary people ought not occupy one seat on the [Supreme] Court—they ought to fill all nine."

In 2019, Parker authored an op-ed in which he claimed that political populism rests upon the Declaration of Independence as its animating document. He argued that the Declaration established the right to abolish government when elite rulers act in a way that expresses alienation and disdain of the governed. This, he claims, has occurred throughout American history as populist regime changes, such as the elections of 1800, 1828, 1860, 1932, and 1980.

He is currently writing an essay entitled "Constitutional Law is in Our Imagination."

=== Impeachment of President Clinton ===
In 1998, prior to the impeachment of President Bill Clinton, Parker was invited to testify before the House Subcommittee on the Constitution on the history and interpretation of impeachment in the United States. In his testimony, Parker eschewed historical comparisons to the impeachments of Andrew Johnson and Richard Nixon, contending that such analyses would "freeze-dry" the meaning of the Constitution's provisions to previous factual situations. Instead, he argued that the operative question was whether the President's misconduct "gravely damage[d]" his capacity to lead. Parker concluded that the standard for impeachable behavior should hinge upon whether such behavior or its attendant state of mind would render an individual unfit to hold the Office of President of the United States.

=== Constitutional amendments ===
Parker supports using the Constitution's Article V amendment process to settle contested issues of constitutional law, rather than through Supreme Court litigation. In his 2003 testimony before the House Subcommittee on the Constitution, he stated:

American Government rests on the Constitution, but the Constitution does not rest on the Supreme Court. It doesn't rest on five people in robes. The Supreme Court can make some mistakes and it's the people who have the power under Article V to correct that mistake, those mistakes, and that is what is being proposed here.

=== Flag desecration amendment ===
Since 1994, Parker has participated with the Citizens Flag Alliance, a group dedicated to advancing the Flag Desecration Amendment. This amendment would overturn the Supreme Court's 1989 decision Texas v. Johnson, which invalidated the Flag Protection Act and state laws passed in 48 out of the 50 states that criminalized desecration of the American flag. Because a majority of Americans polled support amending the Constitution to grant Congress the power to prohibit and criminalize flag desecration, Parker believes that the Supreme Court's holding is out of step with the values of ordinary citizens. A constitutional amendment, in his view, would "correct a historically aberrant 5–4 decision that turned on the vote of one person appointed to a person for life."

In his 2003 testimony before the Subcommittee on the Constitution, he charged elite groups with opposition and indifference to the concerns of ordinary citizens:

In a democracy, the burden should normally be on those who would block majority rule—in this case, a minority of the Congress, influential interest groups and most of the media, along with the five Justices who outvoted the other four—to justify their opposition. They have not been reluctant to do so. Indeed, they have been stunningly aggressive. No less stunning has been their unresponsiveness to (and even their seeming disinterest in) the arguments of the popular and congressional majority.

=== Patriotism ===
Parker has written and testified about the importance of public patriotism, which he understands as "a yearning for connection—despite everything—with one’s compatriots as compatriots." Following the attacks of September 11, 2001, he wrote "Homeland: An Essay on Patriotism," which called on law schools to teach patriotism as “essential to the vitality of democratic politics” and “a source of value and as a popular sentiment.” Testifying before the Senate Committee on the Judiciary in 2004, Parker said:

Public patriotism is surely basic to motivating broad participation in, and commitment to, our democracy. Far from endangering freedom and political order, it is essential to the effective enjoyment of freedom and maintenance of the legitimacy of government. If national projects, civilian or military, are to be undertaken — if our inherited ideals of liberty and equality are to be realized through concentrated national effort — public patriotism simply has to be valued; its unique symbol should, therefore, be protected.
