= Avec Sans =

Electro-pop group

- Origin: London, United Kingdom
- Genres: electro-pop; indie electronic; Synthpop
- Years active: 2012–present
- Members: Alice Fox; Jack St. James
- Website: www.avecsans.com

Avec Sans is a London-based electro-pop group. The band is made up of Alice Fox (vocals, producer) and Jack St. James (electronics, producer).

The name Avec Sans is taken from French, meaning: with without.

== Career ==
Avec Sans are Alice Fox and Jack St. James from Manchester and Trinidad respectively.

Avec Sans started performing live in 2013. They quickly gained recognition for their energetic live shows, which involve Novation launchpads used in tandem tilted towards the audience. Jack has filmed performances using 16 launchpads at once and has helped Novation demo and launch new products online.

Press supporters include The Guardian, who said of their music: "it's a sophisticated slice of delicate synthpop with more interesting production touches and melodic hooks than most bands can muster in a career." Other press support for Avec Sans has also come from publications including: Music Week, Clash, VH1, Noisey, MTV Iggy, PRS for Music M Magazine, Fred Perry Subculture, Artrocker, Digital Spy, Pop Justice, Elle Magazine, Hunger TV, Notion, Wonderland and Tidal (service) who featured them on their electronic music playlist for September 2015. Heartbreak Hi was listed in The Times Essential Tracks feature in April 2016 alongside the latest releases from Bjork, Underworld and White Denim and was described as "marvellously bittersweet electro-pop". In the 10 June 2016 edition, the NME called Avec Sans "a cut above your average duo… right on the sweet spot between hazy '80s Nostalgia and 21st century introspection."

Their track "When You Go" appeared on season one of MTV television series Scream. "Close My Eyes" was used to conclude Season 1 Episode 4 of Nev Schulman's show MTV Suspect and "The Answer" was used on Season 1 Episode 9 of MTV's Are You the One?. Their tracks have also been played nationally across the UK and America in retail outlets such as House of Fraser, Anthropologie and Banana Republic.

Full single releases to date include: Hold On, Shiver, All of Time, Resonate, Heartbreak Hi and Perth; achieving radio play including: BBC Radio London, BBC Introducing, BBC 6 Music, XFM (evening play-listing), Gaydio, Frank Skinner on Absolute Radio and they reached the number one slot on Amazing Radio with their track Heartbreak Hi.

Avec Sans have toured internationally and have featured at a number of music industry events. In May 2015 they played at Canadian Music Week in Toronto, receiving funding from PRS for Music in support of the trip. They played at CMJ, New York City in October 2015 and South by Southwest in 2016. They have supported Little Boots, Capital Cities, Kate Boy and were the main support for Ladyhawke on her Wild Things tour in the UK. They played live for the first BBC Introducing event with Gary Crowley and on the main stage at Bingley Music Live with acts such as The Pet Shop Boys, Example and Gorgon City and at festivals including The Great Escape Festival, Redfest, Sounds from the Other City and Kendal Calling.

The band have remixed artists such as Swiss Lips (Epic), Haerts (Columbia) receiving praise for their work from DJ Sasha.

Before Avec Sans performed in public, they were asked to design a shoe for London fashion brand Swear. In 2014 their music was used on the catwalks of Mercedes-Benz New York Fashion Week. They have been named band of the year by Dolce & Gabbana, have been Track of the Day on Vogue's Vogue.com and have been featured in Teen Vogue, Elle Magazine and DJ'd for the Milan launch of luxury brand Sandro.

In July 2016 Avec Sans released their debut album "Heartbreak Hi" on Beverly Martel.

== Discography ==
=== Albums ===
Studio albums

- Heartbreak Hi (2016, Beverly Martel)
- Succession (2021)

=== Singles ===
Title	Year
"Perth"	2016
"Heartbreak Hi"	2016
"Resonate"	2015
"All of Time"	2014
"Shiver"	2013
"Hold On"	2013

=== Online singles ===
Title	Year
"When You Go"	2015
"Running Up That Hill" (Kate Bush cover)	2014
"Will Do" (TV on the Radio cover)	2014
"The Answer"	2012

=== Remixes ===
Title	Year	Original Artist
"U Got The Power"	2013	Swiss Lips
"Further Still"	2013	Curxes
"Hold On"	2013	Avec Sans
"FRNDS 4 LYF"	2013	Ecstacy
"Shiver"	2013	Avec Sans
"Yeah Yeah"	2014	James Flannigan
"Hemiplegia"	2014	Haerts
"Sugar"	2014	Johnny Stimson
"Shiver Control"	2014	Avec Sans
"Severing Ties"	2015	Young Summer

== Music videos ==
Title	Year	Director
"Perth"	2016	Stuart Birchall
"Heartbreak Hi"	2016	Avec Sans
"All of Time"	2014	Craig Murray
"Shiver"	2013	Sing J. Lee
"Hold On"	2013	Sing J. Lee
