= Rick Parker (baseball) =

American baseball player (born 1963)

- Outfielder
- Born: March 20, 1963 (age 63); Kansas City, Missouri, U.S.
- Batted: Right Threw: Right

MLB debut
- May 4, 1990, for the San Francisco Giants

Last MLB appearance
- August 30, 1998, for the Los Angeles Dodgers

MLB statistics
- Batting average: .244
- Home runs: 2
- Runs batted in: 24
- Stats at Baseball Reference

Teams
- San Francisco Giants (1990–1991); Houston Astros (1993); New York Mets (1994); Los Angeles Dodgers (1995–1996)

Richard Alan Parker (born March 20, 1963) is an American former Major League Baseball outfielder. He played all or part of six seasons in the majors between 1990-96 for the San Francisco Giants (1990–91), Houston Astros (1993), New York Mets (1994), and Los Angeles Dodgers (1995–96). His professional career spanned fourteen seasons, from 1985 to 1998.

Parker attended Southwest Missouri State University for a semester after high school before dropping out, moving to Lubbock, Texas, getting a job with an electronics firm and getting married. During that period of over four years, he continued playing amateur baseball in Dallas where he was scouted by Texas Longhorns baseball coach Cliff Gustafson. He played college baseball for the University of Texas at Austin. He was originally drafted in the 16th round of the 1985 draft by the Philadelphia Phillies, and played in their minor league system for four-plus seasons. He was traded to the Giants in 1989 as the player to be named later in an earlier deal for Steve Bedrosian, and made his major league debut less than a year later. He was released by the Giants after the 1991 season, then spent the rest of his career as a journeyman without ever playing a full season in the majors. He finished his playing career with the Norfolk Tides in the Mets organization.
