= Mary-Jess Leaverland =

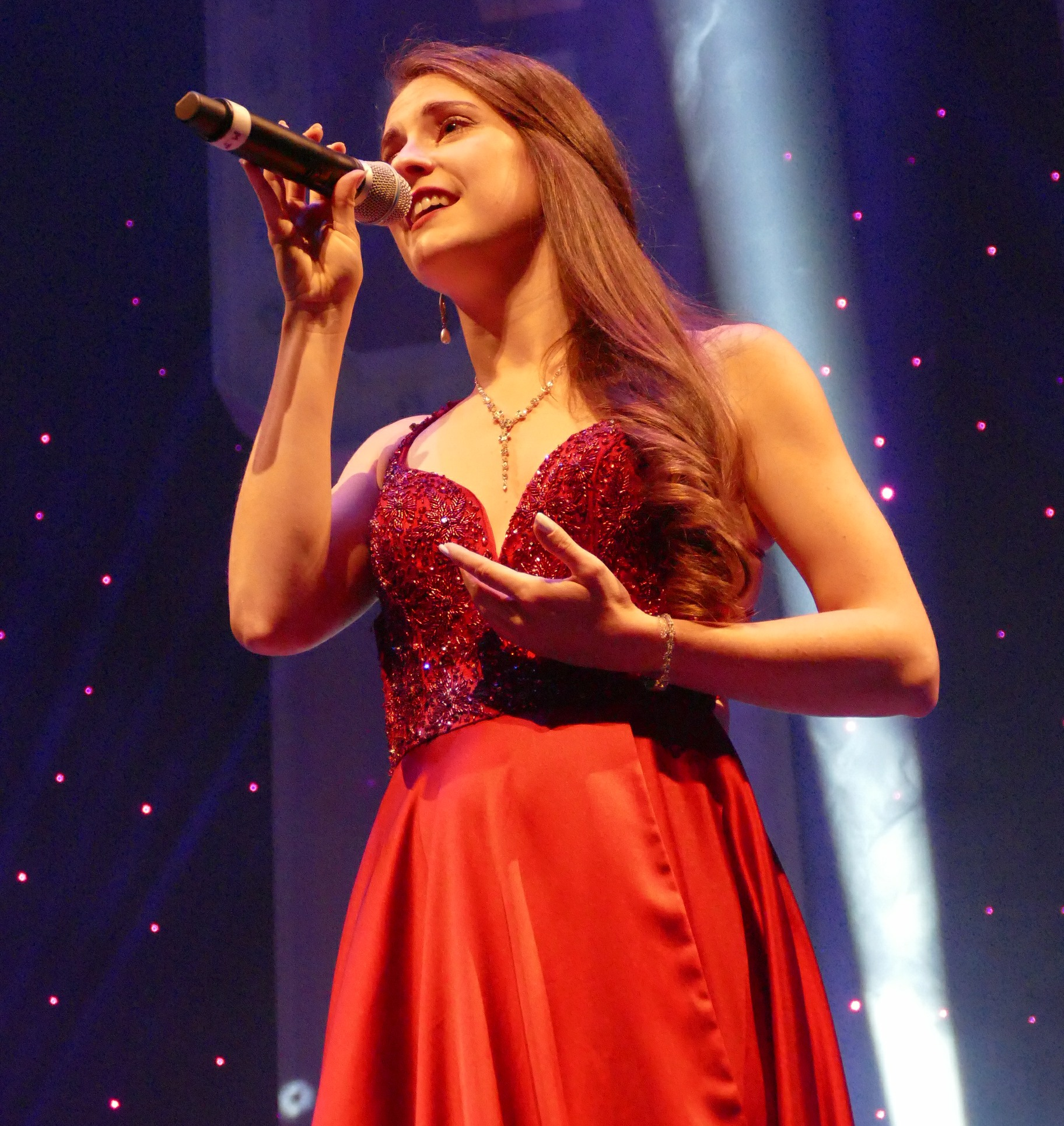
- Leaverland in 2018

Background information
- Born: 28 March 1990 (age 36); Gloucester, England, United Kingdom
- Genres: Pop; classical crossover; Chinese classical
- Occupations: Singer; songwriter
- Instrument: Vocals
- Years active: 2009–present
- Label: Decca
- Website: mary-jess.com

Mary-Jess Leaverland (born 28 March 1990), or simply Mary-Jess, is an English singer and songwriter who won Min Xing Chang Fan Tian (or in English: I Want to Sing to the Stars), the Chinese version of The X Factor, which was televised to 70 million people in December 2009.

== Early years ==
Mary-Jess Leaverland was born on 28 March 1990 in Gloucester, England, and grew up in a musical household. Her mother Liz and her grandmother were both singers. When Jess was nine years old, her grandmother got her an audition with the Gloucester Cathedral Youth Choir, mainly for the experience, but she was surprised to be accepted even though she was two years too young. Mary-Jess went on to study Music and Chinese at the University of Sheffield and in her second year went for a year's placement in Nanjing, China, where she decided to enter a live televised singing competition. After achieving success from the singing competition, Mary-Jess left university after receiving a record deal to pursue her singing career.

== Career ==
=== Breakthrough (2010-2011) ===
Mary-Jess advanced through Min Xing Chang Fan Tian (or in English: I Want to Sing to the Stars) all the way to the final, where she won the grand prize after competing live on Chinese television every night for three weeks. After winning the contest however, Jess still remained virtually unknown in the UK. The show was not broadcast outside Jiangsu Province, China, so her family and friends could not watch it and her family could not afford to fly to China to watch her. When an interview she gave to a local Gloucester paper was picked up by the national press, the news spread, and Leaverland was offered several recording contracts and she signed a recording contract with Decca Records. She was signed to Decca from March 2010 to November 2011.

Mary-Jess stated in an interview with The Guardian that "I was awful at French but Chinese caught my attention with all the different tones. Each word had its own tune." The Music and Chinese Studies course at the University of Sheffield took Leaverland to Nanjing, and when she by chance came across auditions for the talent competition she wanted to get involved. "I really thought they would want a Chinese person to win. I couldn't believe it when it was me."

Her debut album Shine was released on 8 August 2011 and peaked at no. 57 on the UK Albums Chart. Before release she went on a 23-date UK tour with tenor Russell Watson as his special guest. She was chosen to contribute to the Downton Abbey soundtrack, lending vocals to the song "Did I Make the Most of Loving You?".

In December 2011, she appeared as a soloist on the BBC Songs of Praise broadcast from All Saints' Church, Cheltenham, and again on Easter Sunday, in April 2012.

Her song "Stand as One" was used as a background theme for P&G – Proud Sponsor of Mums TV advert in 2012. Mary-Jess was selected to sing the FA Cup Christian hymn "Abide with Me" before the 2012 FA Cup Final association football match between Chelsea and Liverpool. In 2013, she appeared at the Cheltenham Music Festival.

=== 2015 ===
In 2015, Mary-Jess was invited to No. 10 Downing Street and was asked to serve as a representative of the British Council's GREAT Britain Campaign to represent British music worldwide.

=== 2016 ===
In 2016, she conducted a short teaching tour of Suzhou, Lanzhou and Hangzhou, China with the British Council as part of The GREAT Britain Campaign. Later that year she released her second album 'Prayer to a Snowflake', a winter/Christmas album which features duets with Jaden Cornelious and Rhydian. She then embarked on a UK tour to celebrate the release. Mary-Jess also released her winter album ‘Prayer to a Snowflake’ in November 2016 to critical acclaim.

=== 2017 ===
In March 2017 Mary-Jess toured with G4 as their special guest and was asked to return for the September leg. She then followed that with her own tour and campaign.

=== 2018 ===
Her second album ‘Inspire’, was released in April 2018.

=== 2019 ===
In 2019, Mary-Jess sang in the new year with Katherine Jenkins, Aled Jones, Shane Filan, and many other special guests for BBC Songs of Praise's ‘The Big Sing’ from the Royal Albert Hall to a viewing audience of two million people.

In addition to singing and touring, Mary-Jess gives inspirational talks and presentations about the importance of learning languages and how learning Chinese changed her life forever. She also gives singing work shops and masterclasses, working with young singers and choirs to develop their voice.

== Discography ==
=== Albums ===
Title	Album details	Chart positions
Title	Album details	UK
Shine	Released: 8 August 2011; Label: Decca Records; Formats: CD, digital download	57
Prayer to a Snowflake	Released: 22 November 2016; Formats: CD	
Inspire	Released: 20 April 2018; Formats: CD	

=== Singles ===
Song	Year	Peak positions	Album
Song	Year	UK	Album
"Are You The Way Home?"	2011	—	Shine
"Glorious"	2011	—	Shine
"Heaven Is Empty"	2011	—	Shine
"I Fell in Love with a Snowman"	2016	—	Prayer to a Snowflake
"The Sound of Christmas" with Rhydian	2016	—	Prayer to a Snowflake

== Charity work ==
Mary-Jess is a member of the Royal British Legion Gloucester City Branch, patron of The Door Youth Project, and she is an ambassador for Half the Sky, a charity that helps orphaned and abandoned children in China.

== Personal life ==
Mary-Jess Leaverland was married to Rich Parker, a professional vert rollerblader. The pair have since separated.
