= Science Fiction (Hikaru Utada album) =

- Standard cover

Greatest hits album by Hikaru Utada
- Released: April 10, 2024
- Recorded: 1998–2024
- Genre: J-pop; dance; R&B; electronica
- Length: 119:28
- Language: Japanese; English
- Label: Epic Japan; USM Japan
- Producer: Hikaru Utada; A. G. Cook; Akira Miyake; Teruzane Skingg Utada; Taku Takahashi; Nariaki Obukuro; Sam Shepherd

Hikaru Utada chronology
Hikaru Utada Live Sessions from Air Studios (2022)	Science Fiction (2024)	Hikaru Utada Science Fiction Tour 2024 (2024)

Singles from Science Fiction
- 1. "Gold (Mata au Hi Made)" Released: July 28, 2023; 2. "Naniiro de mo Nai Hana" Released: February 12, 2024; 3. "Somewhere Near Marseilles (Sci-Fi Edit)" Released: April 3, 2024; 4. "Electricity" Released: July 9, 2025

Science Fiction is the first greatest hits album and fourth overall compilation album by Japanese-American singer-songwriter Hikaru Utada, released on April 10, 2024, through Epic Records Japan and USM Japan. Commemorating the 25th anniversary of their debut, the album consists of two discs with 26 tracks, including new mixes and re-recordings of their previous singles and three original tracks, "Gold (Mata au Hi Made)", "Naniiro Demo Nai Hana", and "Electricity". In support of the album, Utada embarked on the Science Fiction Tour in 2024.

Science Fiction debuted atop Oricon Albums Chart and Billboard Japan Hot Albums. The album sold 171,882 copies on its first week of release, making it Utada's overall twelfth number-one album in Japan.

== Background and promotion ==
Hikaru Utada released their first original single since their eighth Japanese-language studio album Bad Mode, titled "Gold (Mata au Hi Made)", on July 28, 2023. The song served as a theme for the film Kingdom: Flame of Destiny. On December 9, Utada announced Science Fiction, their first greatest hits album, to commemorate their 25th anniversary since their debut in 1998 with "Automatic" / "Time Will Tell". A month later, they unveiled the release date, to be April 10, 2024.

Following the album announcement, the single "Naniiro de mo Nai Hana" was released on February 12, 2024, used as theme for the drama Kimi ga Kokoro o Kureta kara. Utada first performed the song on CDTV Live! Live! on February 26. To promote Science Fiction, Utada's music videos produced between 1998 and 2012 were remastered in 4K resolution by artificial intelligence and premiered from March 14 for "Wait & See (Risk)" to April 8 for "First Love".

Ahead of Science Fiction, the 2024 mix of "Automatic" was released on March 22, and "Somewhere Near Marseilles (Sci-Fi Edit)" on April 3. Two songs from the album featured on the television advertisements starring by the singer—"Electricity" for general trading company Itochu, and the re-recorded version of "Traveling" for iced green tea brand Ayataka. Utada also appeared on the double covers and gave an interview for the June 2024 edition of Nylon Japan.

To promote the album, Utada gave the first televised performance of "First Love" in 24 years on April 8 at CDTV Live! Live!. They appeared on With Music on April 13 to perform "One Last Kiss" and "Nijikan Dake no Vacance" with Ringo Sheena, and NHK Music Special on April 18 to perform the re-recorded version of "Traveling" and "Hikari", and "Electricity". The supporting concert tour of the same name, Science Fiction Tour 2024, will begin in July 2024 in Japan, as well as Hong Kong and Taipei.

== Track listing ==
All tracks are written by Hikaru Utada, except where noted.

Science Fiction disc one
No.	Title	Producer(s)	Length
1.	"Addicted to You" (re-recording; from Distance)	H. Utada; A. G. Cook	4:28
2.	"First Love" (2022 mix; from First Love)	Akira Miyake; Teruzane Skingg Utada	4:22
3.	"Hanataba o Kimi ni" (花束を君に; from Fantôme)	H. Utada	4:39
4.	"One Last Kiss" (from One Last Kiss)	H. Utada; A. G. Cook	4:11
5.	"Sakura Drops" (SAKURAドロップス, 2024 mix; from Deep River)	Miyake; H. Utada; T. Utada	4:49
6.	"Anata" (あなた; from Hatsukoi)	H. Utada	4:38
7.	"Can You Keep a Secret?" (2024 mix; from Distance)	Miyake; T. Utada	4:44
8.	"Michi" (道; from Fantôme)	H. Utada	3:38
9.	"Prisoner of Love" (2024 mix; from Heart Station)	Miyake; H. Utada; T. Utada	4:46
10.	"Hikari" (光, re-recording; from Deep River)	H. Utada; A. G. Cook	4:36
11.	"Flavor of Life" (ballad version, 2024 mix; from Heart Station)	H. Utada; Miyake; T. Utada
12.	"Goodbye Happiness" (2024 mix; from Utada Hikaru Single Collection Vol. 2)	Miyake; H. Utada; T. Utada	5:04
Total length:			58:29

Science Fiction disc two
No.	Title	Producer(s)	Length
1.	"Traveling" (re-recording; from Deep River)	Taku Takahashi; H. Utada	5:08
2.	"Beautiful World" (2024 mix; from Heart Station)	Miyake; H. Utada; T. Utada	4:43
3.	"Automatic" (2024 mix; from First Love)	Miyake; T. Utada	4:55
4.	"Kimi ni Muchū" (君に夢中; from Bad Mode)	H. Utada; A. G. Cook	4:18
5.	"Naniiro de mo Nai Hana" (何色でもない花)	H. Utada; A. G. Cook	4:04
6.	"Hatsukoi" (初恋; from Hatsukoi)	H. Utada; Nariaki	4:42
7.	"Time" (from Bad Mode)	H. Utada; Nariaki	5:00
8.	"Letters" (2024 mix; from Deep River)	Miyake; H. Utada; T. Utada	4:37
9.	"Bad Mode" (BADモード; from Bad Mode) (written by H. Utada, Jodi Milliner)	H. Utada; Sam Shepherd	5:04
10.	"Colors" (2024 mix; from Ultra Blue)	Miyake; H. Utada; T. Utada	4:02
11.	"Nijikan Dake no Vacance" (二時間だけのバカンス, featuring Ringo Sheena; from Fantôme)	H. Utada	4:44
12.	"Gold (Mata au Hi Made)" (Gold 〜また逢う日まで〜)	H. Utada; A. G. Cook	4:16
13.	"Electricity"	H. Utada; Shepherd	4:21
14.	"Somewhere Near Marseilles" (マルセイユ辺り, Sci-Fi Edit; from Bad Mode) (written by H. Utada, Shepherd)	Shepherd; H. Utada	4:11
Total length:			60:59

== Charts ==
=== Weekly charts ===
Weekly chart performance for Science Fiction
Chart (2024)	Peak position
Japanese Albums (Oricon)	1
Japanese Combined Albums (Oricon)	1
Japanese Hot Albums (Billboard Japan)	1

=== Monthly charts ===
Monthly chart performance for Science Fiction
Chart (2024)	Position
Japanese Albums (Oricon)	2

=== Year-end charts ===
2024 year-end chart performance for Science Fiction
Chart (2024)	Position
Japanese Albums (Oricon)	10
Japanese Digital Albums (Oricon)	2
Japanese Combined Albums (Oricon)	7
Japanese Hot Albums (Billboard Japan)	9

2025 year-end chart performance for Science Fiction
Chart (2025)	Position
Japanese Download Albums (Billboard Japan)	53

== Certifications ==
Certifications for Science Fiction
Region	Certification	Certified units/sales
Japan (RIAJ)	Platinum	250,000^{^}
^{^} Shipments figures based on certification alone.

== Release history ==
Release dates and formats for Science Fiction
Region	Date	Format	Label	Ref.
Various	April 10, 2024	Digital download; streaming	Epic Japan; USM Japan	
Japan	April 10, 2024	CD	Epic Japan	
Japan	June 26, 2024	LP	USM Japan	
