= Mine or Yours =

Single by Hikaru Utada
- Language: Japanese; English
- Released: May 2, 2025
- Length: 4:22
- Label: Epic Japan
- Songwriter: Hikaru Utada
- Producers: Hikaru Utada; Henry Bowers-Broadbent

Hikaru Utada singles chronology
"Somewhere Near Marseilles" (2024)	"Mine or Yours" (2025)	"Electricity" (2025)

Music video
- "Mine or Yours" on YouTube

"Mine or Yours" is a song recorded by Japanese-American singer-songwriter Hikaru Utada, released on May 2, 2025, via Epic Records Japan.

== Background ==
Following the Science Fiction Tour, Hikaru Utada released a series of remixes for their single "Electricity" from the greatest hits album Science Fiction. In March, Utada was appointed as a brand ambassador for Coca-Cola's Ayataka, a line of iced green tea. A commercial was issued in March 2025 featuring a snippet of a new song titled "Mine or Yours". On April 18, Utada's management announced a May 2 release date for the single.

== Promotion ==
A pre-add campaign launched on April 19 where 200 people selected by a lottery would receive a t-shirt with the cover art of "Mine or Yours". Following the track's debut, a release party was held on YouTube. Utada also appeared on The Zane Lowe Show in Tokyo at Apple Music's newly opened studio.

== Live performances ==
Shortly after the release of "Mine or Yours", Utada performed the song on The First Take. The 544th episode premiered on YouTube on May 2.

== Track listing ==
- 12" Vinyl
1. "Mine or Yours" – 4:22
2. "Mine or Yours" (Yaeji remix) – 4:16
3. "Mine or Yours" (The Blessed Madonna Godsquad mix) – 5:06
4. "Mine or Yours" (Bella Boo remix) – 3:54
- Digital download and streaming – Mine or Yours EP
1. "Mine or Yours" – 4:22
2. "Mine or Yours" (Yaeji remix) – 4:16
3. "Mine or Yours" (The Blessed Madonna Godsquad mix) – 5:06
4. "Mine or Yours" (Bella Boo remix) – 3:54
5. "Mine or Yours (From the First Take)
6. "Mine or Yours" (instrumental) – 4:22

== Credits and personnel ==
- Hikaru Utada – vocals, production
- Henry Bowers-Broadbent – production, instruments
- Ben Parker – acoustic guitar
- Seye Adelekan – bass
- Isaac Kizito – drums
- Hinako Omori – piano

== Charts ==
=== Weekly charts ===
Weekly chart performance
Chart (2025)	Peak position
Japan (Japan Hot 100)	13
Japan (Oricon)	15
Japan Digital Singles (Oricon)	11

=== Monthly charts ===
Monthly chart performance
Chart (2025)	Position
Japan (Oricon)	50

== Release history ==
Release history and formats for "Mine or Yours"
Region	Date	Format	Version	Label	Ref.
Various	May 2, 2025	Digital download; streaming	Original	Epic Japan	
Various	October 6, 2025	Digital download; streaming	Yaeji remix	Epic Japan	
Various	October 20, 2025	Digital download; streaming	The Blessed Madonna remix	Epic Japan	
Various	November 7, 2025	Digital download; streaming	Bella Boo remix	Epic Japan	
Various	November 26, 2025	Digital download; streaming	EP	Epic Japan	
Japan	November 26, 2025	LP	Standard	Epic Japan	
Japan	November 26, 2025	LP	Standard (Amazon Japan exclusive)	Epic Japan	
