= Somewhere Near Marseilles =

- Sci-Fi Edit cover

Single by Hikaru Utada

from the album Bad Mode and Science Fiction
- Released: April 3, 2024
- Studio: ABS Studios (Japan)
- Genre: Balearic beat
- Length: 11:55 (album version); 4:13 (Sci-Fi edit)
- Label: Epic Japan
- Songwriter: Hikaru Utada
- Producers: Hikaru Utada; Sam Shepherd

Hikaru Utada singles chronology
"Naniiro de mo Nai Hana" (2024)	"Somewhere Near Marseilles" (2024)	"Mine or Yours" (2025)

Music video
- "Somewhere Near Marseilles (Sci-Fi Edit)" on YouTube

"Somewhere Near Marseilles" (Somewhere Near Marseilles -マルセイユ辺り-, Somewhere Near Marseilles -Maruseiyu Atari-) is a song by Japanese-American singer Hikaru Utada. It appeared as the closing song to the standard version of Utada's eleventh studio album Bad Mode (2022), and a live recording of the song was released as a single on September 16, 2022. On April 3, 2024, Epic Records Japan released the "Sci-Fi Edit" version as the third single from Utada's first greatest hits album, Science Fiction (2024). The song was written entirely by Utada and arranged and produced by Utada and Sam Shepherd.

"Somewhere Near Marseilles" is a 12-minute house track that incorporates elements of acid house, disco, and Balearic house, as well as ambient noises, synthesisers, and electronic instruments. The Sci-Fi edit is approximately four minutes long and retains many of the original composition elements. Lyrically, the song discusses a long-distance relationship and travelling from London and Paris to Marseille for a rendezvous. The original version was chosen as the commercial theme song for the Japanese distribution of jewellery company Cartier.

"Somewhere Near Marseilles" received critical acclaim from music critics, with many citing it as a standout from the parent album. Furthermore, many critics praised the song's composition, production quality, Utada's vocals, and length, with some publications including the track on their year-end lists. Yuichi Kodama directed two music videos for the song, the live recorded version and the Sci-Fi edit, both of which were shot at the Yokohama Hakkeijima Sea Paradise, with the latter featuring re-edited footage from the original.

== Background and development ==
Throughout 2020 and 2021, Utada began working on music for their eleventh studio album, Bad Mode (2022). Throughout the process, Utada released a number of singles and commercial theme songs in Japan to promote the album, confirming that it would be their first bilingual release. Bad Mode was released in various territories on January 19, 2022, and included the song "Somewhere Near Marseilles", which served as the album's standard closing track. Utada wrote "Somewhere Near Marseilles", and assisted Sam Shepherd in composing and producing it. Utada's vocals were recorded at ABS Recordings and edited by Yuya Saito. The final recording was mixed by Steve Fitzmaurice at Pierce Room and mastered at Sterling Sound Studios in Edgewater, New Jersey.

== Composition ==
"Somewhere Near Marseilles" is a 12-minute house track that incorporates various musical notes and influences. The song's lyrics describe a long-distance relationship between Utada in London and their lover in Paris. Throughout the lyrics, Utada suggests a "rendezvous vacay" for the lover to Marseilles, as mentioned in the song title. Andrew Ryce from Resident Advisor described it as a "smouldering torch song sung to a distant lover," noting that the lyrics are in both English and Japanese. In terms of production, Ryce explained that Utada's "vocal production sits so perfectly on Floating Points' gentle rhythms that once Utada begins to fade into the track for its extended outro, you barely notice."

Musically, Playy. magazine called it a "near twelve-minute acid house deep dive," emphasising the song's use of synths and ambient noise. Lars Gotrich from NPR Music described it as a "hypnotic disco train" with "soft-panning bongos, 808 kick drums, and funky synths glide". Pitchfork editor Joshua Minsoo Kim called it a "lively Balearic house epic with acid squelches, hand percussion, and an irresistible depiction of romance." Peter Piatkowski of PopMatters described the song as "muted house beat and subtle electronic flourishes that frame Utada's sweet croon." Ryce described the overall beat as "laid-back" and heard elements of acid house in the sound.

Utada wrote many tracks from Bad Mode during the COVID-19 pandemic in 2020, and stated that the majority of the songs reflected their personality, such as motherhood, personal struggles, and improving relationships with others. Billboard expressed similar feelings about its pandemic influence, describing it as a "club-like tune that deftly evokes the precarious emotional states people have been thrust into by the pandemic." Tsuya-Chan of Tokion first questioned the song's title, pointing out Utada's use of London and Paris in the lyrics, with the former being Utada's home. Tsuya went on to investigate whether the word "Marseilles" in the lyrics could be used as a "series of sounds" for both English and Japanese delivery.

== Release and promotion ==
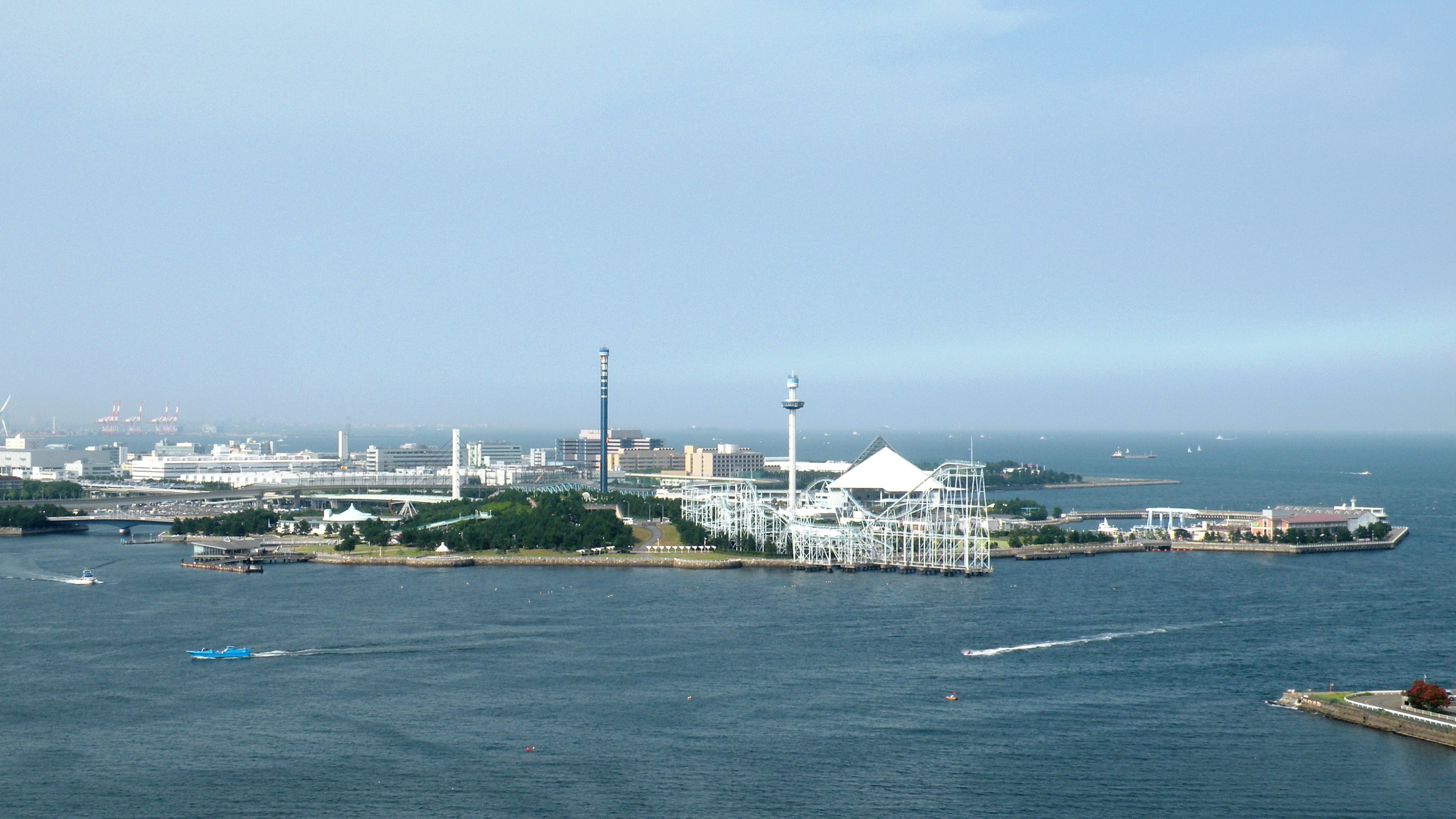
The video to "Somewhere Near Marseilles" was filmed at an aquarium at the Yokohama Hakkeijima Sea Paradise location.

Epic and Universal Music Japan first released "Somewhere Near Marseilles" on January 19, 2022, as part of Bad Mode. In July, the song served as the commercial theme song for Cartier's collaboration with Chitose Abe in Japan. Yuichi Kodama directed a special campaign film starring Utada, which included a behind-the-scenes video. Kodama also directed a live music video at Yokohama Hakkeijima Sea Paradise, in which Utada performs the song while various audience members dance and walk around an aquarium. The visual was released in two formats: vertical angle and panorama, and premiered exclusively to Spotify in part of their five-year anniversary celebration of the service launching in Japan. On September 16, the same live recorded version became available for video streaming.

Utada announced their first greatest hits album, Science Fiction (2022), in January 2024, which features a mix of reworked and original singles from Utada's music discography, and is to commemorate the singer's 25th career anniversary. The Sci-Fi edit of "Somewhere Near Marseilles" was added to the album's track list and serves as the final song on the second disc. It was later confirmed to be the album's third single and was made available digitally on April 3. Similar versions of the vertical and panorama videos were distributed on Utada's YouTube channel featuring the Sci-Fi edit.

== Critical reception ==
Music critics lauded "Somewhere Near Marseilles". Peter Piatkowski of PopMatters praised Utada's collaboration with Shepherd, calling the song "excellent". Andrew Ryce of Resident Advisor praised Utada's collaboration with Shepherd, complimenting Utada's vocal delivery and the song's sound. Ryce went on to describe it as follows: "It's not quite a dance floor album—it's too subtle and stately for that—but it's somewhere wonderfully in-between, an amorous ballad you can tap your foot to, a track that channels the frenetic energy of acid house something a little more relaxed...". Similarly, Lars Gotrich of NPR compared it to Shepherd's collaboration with Pharoah Sanders on his album Promises (2021), writing "even when we depart or disintegrate their transcendent voice, it's implied in the production's undulating shape, still shimmering in awe of Hikaru Utada's presence."

Joshua Minsoo Kim of Pitchfork noted the song's lyricism and overall themes, writing, "Inspiration can't help but strike in a locale this rich in beauty, so across 12 minutes, Utada conjures up a similarly expansive space overflowing with possibility." Playy. magazine described it as a "feat of a track" and praised its "audacious" blend of house and pop music, writing that "Somewhere Near Marseilles" is "near house-pop perfection. Floating Points crafts an effortlessly laidback landscape for Utada’s voice to make her discotheque, and she practically melts into the scenery like butter." Sputnikmusic gave it a positive review, praising Utada's work on the song, but criticised Shepherd's lack of innovation given how long the song is.

By the end of 2022, "Somewhere Near Marseilles" had made several year-end lists and received reviews from various publications. Pitchfork editor Eric Torres described "Somewhere Near Marseilles" as a "jet-setting, showstopping finale frames a Mediterranean tryst in finger snaps and rubbery synths" and concluded "Somewhere Near Marseilles" "makes falling hard and fast sound like its own euphoric form of escape." Ryce from Resident Advisor stated that the song "unfolds over 11 minutes of exquisitely produced house, bobbing and glimmering in all the right places." Slant Magazine writer Paul Attard described the song as "groovy" and "globe-trotting," while Jordan Danville from The Fader praised its sound, writing "all-encompassing delirium is the music of Utada's heart...".

=== Year-end and decade-end lists ===
"Somewhere Near Marseilles" on critic year-end lists
Critic/Publisher	List	Ranking	Ref.
Gorilla vs. Bear	Top 50 Songs of 2022	5	
Pitchfork	The 100 Best Songs of 2022	10	
Resident Advisor	The Best Tracks of 2022	Placed	
Slant Magazine	The 50 Best Songs of 2022	6	
The Fader	The 100 Best Songs of 2022	42	

"Somewhere Near Marseilles" on critic decade-end lists
Critic/Publisher	List	Ranking	Ref.
Pitchfork	The 100 Best Songs of the 2020s So Far	18	

== Formats and track listing ==
Album version

1. "Somewhere Near Marseilles" – 11:55

Sci-Fi edit

1. "Somewhere Near Marseilles" (Sci-Fi edit) – 4:13

== Credits and personnel ==
Credits adapted from the liner notes of Bad Mode.

Locations

- Recorded at ABS Studios in Tokyo; mixed at Pierce Room; mastered at Sterling Sound Studios in Edgewater, New Jersey.

Personnel

- Hikaru Utada – arranger, composer, keyboards, instrumentation, producer, programming, songwriter, vocals, background vocals,
- Sam Shepherd – arranger, composer, keyboards, producer, programming
- Yuya Saito – vocal editing
- Steve Fitzmaurice – recording
- Will Fry – percussion

== Charts ==
Chart performance for "Somewhere Near Marseilles"
Chart (2024)	Peak position
Japan Download Songs (Billboard Japan)	93

== Release history ==
"Somewhere Near Marseilles" release history
Region	Date	Version	Format	Label	Ref(s).
Various	January 19, 2022	Album version	Digital download	Epic Japan	
Various	September 16, 2022	Live version	Digital download; video streaming	Epic Japan	
Various	April 3, 2024	Sci-Fi edit	Digital download	Epic Japan	
