= Electricity (Hikaru Utada song) =

2025 single by Hikaru Utada

- Remix EP cover

Single by Hikaru Utada

from the album Science Fiction
- Language: Japanese; English
- Released: July 9, 2025
- Recorded: 2023
- Length: 4:21
- Label: Epic Japan
- Songwriter: Hikaru Utada
- Producers: Hikaru Utada; Floating Points

Hikaru Utada singles chronology
"Mine or Yours" (2025)	"Electricity" (2025)	"Jane Doe" (2025)

Music video
- "Electricity" on YouTube

"Electricity" is a song recorded by Japanese-American singer-songwriter Hikaru Utada, released on July 9, 2025, via Epic Records Japan. Originally released as a promotional single, "Electricity" later served as the fourth single from Utada's greatest hits album, Science Fiction.

== Background and release ==
Ahead of the release of their greatest hits album, Science Fiction, Hikaru Utada teased a new song featured on the album, "Electricity", on a commercial advertisement for the Japanese general trading company Itochu. The full song was later released on April 10, as the thirteenth track of the second disc from their greatest hits album.

In February 2025, Utada released a remix of "Electricity" with Karen Nyame KG. Two other remix singles were released digitally, an Arca remix and Salute remix. A remix EP and LP record was later released in July.

== Promotion ==
The Karen Nyame KG remix of "Electricity" premiered during a pre-release party held in Osaka. A pre-order campaign was held for the Arca and Salute remix.

== Live performances ==
Utada performed "Electricity" primarily as the encore song during their Science Fiction Tour. At Coachella 2025, Utada made a guest appearance during Arca's set, performing "Electricity".

== Music video ==
On December 6, 2024, Utada released a teaser for the "Electricity" music video. The music video later premiered on their YouTube channel on December 9.

A music video for the Arca remix of "Electricity" was released on April 22, 2025.

== Track listing ==
- 12" Vinyl
1. "Electricity" – 4:21
2. "Electricity" (Karen Nyame KG remix) – 3:42
3. "Electricity" (Arca remix) – 3:38
4. "Electricity" (Salute remix) – 4:10
- Digital download and streaming – Electricity Remixes EP
1. "Electricity" – 4:21
2. "Electricity" (Karen Nyame KG remix) – 3:42
3. "Electricity" (Arca remix) – 3:38
4. "Electricity" (Salute remix) – 4:10
5. "Electricity" (instrumental) – 4:21

== Personnel ==
- Hikaru Utada – vocals, production, programming
- Floating Points – production, programming
- Melraw – saxophone, flute
- Alex Reeve – guitar
- Kuniyuki Takahashi – percussion
- Hinako Omori – piano
- Steve Fitzmaurice – mixing

== Charts ==
Chart performance for "Electricity"
Chart (2024–2025)	Peak position
Japan (Oricon)	31
Japan Download Songs (Billboard Japan)	74
Japan Top Singles Sales (Billboard Japan)	34

== Release history ==
Release history and formats for "Electricity"
Region	Date	Format(s)	Version	Label	Ref.
Various	February 15, 2025	Digital download; streaming	Karen Nyame KG remix	Epic Japan	
Various	February 28, 2025	Digital download; streaming	Arca remix	Epic Japan	
Various	March 31, 2025	Digital download; streaming	Salute remix	Epic Japan	
Various	July 9, 2025	Digital download; streaming	Remixes EP	Epic Japan	
Japan	July 9, 2025	LP	Remixes (type A)	Epic Japan	
Japan	July 9, 2025	LP	Remixes (Amazon Japan type B exclusive)	Epic Japan	
