= Cascade (Floating Points album) =

Studio album by Floating Points
- Released: 13 September 2024
- Studio: EMS4 (London); Sunfair (California); Different Fur (California); Rancho De La Luna (California)
- Genre: Electronic
- Length: 57:32
- Label: Ninja Tune

Floating Points chronology
Promises (2021)	Cascade (2024)

Singles from Cascade
- 1. "Vocoder" Released: 9 March 2022; 2. "Birth4000" Released: 17 October 2023; 3. "Del Oro" Released: 4 June 2024; 4. "Key103" Released: 9 July 2024; 5. "Ocotillo" Released: 22 August 2024

Cascade is the third studio album by British electronic musician Sam Shepherd under the alias Floating Points. It was released on 13 September 2024 through Ninja Tune and received universal acclaim from critics. The album topped the UK Dance Albums Chart.

== Background ==
Cascade is Floating Points' first solo studio album since Crush (2019). He collaborated with Pharoah Sanders and London Symphony Orchestra on Promises (2021). He then created his first ballet score, Mere Mortals, in collaboration with San Francisco Ballet. Cascade was inspired by his hometown of Manchester. The song "Afflecks Palace" refers to an emporium in the city. The song "Key103" takes its title from a Manchester radio station. The album's cover art was created by Akiko Nakayama. "Vocoder", "Birth4000", "Del Oro", "Key103", and "Ocotillo" were released as singles from the album.

== Critical reception ==
Professional ratings
Aggregate scores
Source	Rating
AnyDecentMusic?	7.8/10
Metacritic	83/100
Review scores
Source	Rating
AllMusic	4/5 stars
Clash	8/10
The Line of Best Fit	8/10
MusicOMH	4.5/5 stars
The Observer	5/5 stars
Pitchfork	8.0/10
PopMatters	7/10
Under the Radar	8.5/10

According to the review aggregator Metacritic, Cascade received "universal acclaim" based on a weighted average score of 83 out of 100 from 13 critic scores.

Brandon Miller of PopMatters commented that "Across nine tracks, Floating Points guides listeners through a series of self-reflective passages and hard club drops, suitable for both sweaty dance floors and moments of existential solitude." Robin Murray of Clash stated, "an autobiographical paean to club culture, it acts as a window of insight into his electronic imagination, while also slapping hard." Paul Simpson of AllMusic called it "yet another marvelous Floating Points album, and easily the most successful work he's made as a dance producer." Krystal Rodriguez of Billboard stated, "A collection of unconventional club bangers, it pulses with twitchy textures, glistening melodies, synth freak-outs and gravelly drums." Andrew Sacher of BrooklynVegan stated, "Like cohorts Four Tet, Jamie xx, and Daphni, Floating Points has an ear for melody that makes Cascade a gorgeous record, but it also goes even deeper into hard-hitting body music than most of Crush did."

It was nominated for the Best Electronic Record award at the 2025 Libera Awards.

=== Accolades ===
Year-end lists for Cascade
Publication	List	Rank	Ref.
Exclaim!	Exclaim!'s 50 Best Albums of 2024	46	
MusicOMH	musicOMH's Top 50 Albums of 2024	11	
Rolling Stone	The 100 Best Albums of 2024	83	
Slant Magazine	The 50 Best Albums of 2024	36	
Stereogum	The 50 Best Albums of 2024	32	

== Track listing ==
All tracks are written by Sam Shepherd.

Cascade track listing
No.	Title	Length
1.	"Vocoder (Club Mix)"	7:31
2.	"Key103"	7:22
3.	"Birth4000"	4:46
4.	"Del Oro"	6:14
5.	"Fast Forward"	7:38
6.	"Ocotillo"	8:43
7.	"Afflecks Palace"	6:38
8.	"Tilt Shift"	4:40
9.	"Ablaze"	3:57
Total length:		57:32

== Personnel ==
Credits adapted from liner notes.

- Sam Shepherd – music, arrangement, recording
- Dan Snaith – drums (5)
- Miriam Adefris – harp (6)
- Hannah Ekholm – voice (7)
- Stella Mozgawa – drums (7)
- Hikaru Utada – voice (8, 9)
- Matt Colton – mastering
- Akiko Nakayama – artwork
- Matthew Cooper – design

== Charts ==
Chart performance for Cascade
Chart (2024)	Peak position
Belgian Albums (Ultratop Flanders)	84
Scottish Albums (OCC)	15
UK Albums (OCC)	90
UK Dance Albums (OCC)	1
UK Independent Albums (OCC)	4
