= Nariaki =

- Gender: Male

Origin
- Origin: Japanese
- Meaning: Different meanings depending on the kanji used

Nariaki (written: 斉昭 or 成彬) is a masculine Japanese given name. Notable people with the name include:

- Nariaki Nakayama (中山 成彬; born 1943), Japanese politician
- Nariaki Obukuro (小袋 成彬; born 1991), Japanese singer, songwriter, producer and CEO
- Tokugawa Nariaki (徳川 斉昭; 1800–1860), Japanese daimyō
