= Late Night Tales: Floating Points =

Compilation album by Floating Points
- Released: 29 March 2019
- Genres: Ambient; jazz; soul; psychedelic pop; folk; electronic
- Length: 77:21
- Label: Night Time Stories
- Producer: Floating Points

Floating Points chronology
Reflections – Mojave Desert (2017)	Late Night Tales: Floating Points (2019)	Crush (2019)

Late Night Tales chronology
Late Night Tales: Agnes Obel (2018)	Late Night Tales: Floating Points (2019)	Late Night Tales: Hot Chip (2020)

Late Night Tales: Floating Points is a DJ mix album curated by Floating Points for Late Night Tales series, released by Night Time Stories on 29 March 2019. The album includes a variety of genres that influenced Floating Points during the years, including ambient, jazz, soul, psychedelic pop, folk, electronic, and it features artists such as Sarah Davachi, William S. Fischer, Azimuth, Max Roach, and Kaitlyn Aurelia Smith, among others.

== Reception ==
Professional ratings
Aggregate scores
Source	Rating
Metacritic	81/100
Review scores
Source	Rating
AllMusic	4/5 stars
Pitchfork	7.5/10
Resident Advisor	4.3/5
XLR8R	7.5/10
Crack Magazine	8/10

Late Night Tales: Floating Points received favorable reviews. Fred Thomas of AllMusic wrote, "...producer Sam Shepherd weaves together an intricate mix of dusky jazz, pastel-colored ambient tracks, and orchestral soul sounds from around the globe that begin to mirror the same patchwork of rhythms and vibes that makes up the best of his Floating Points compositions." Pitchfork's Andy Beta wrote, "Shepherd takes the opportunity to float through an unhurried selection of ruminative, crepuscular music for the wee hours. Unlike his good friend Four Tet's eclectic contribution to the series, Floating Points keeps the mood consistent." Resident Advisor's Matt McDermott wrote, "Late Night Tales' 17 tracks are unsurprisingly tasteful including many that are impossibly rare. But it's not an overly studied trainspotters' paradise. Many of the obscure songs should appeal to the fanbase drawn in by Shepherd's productions."

Sam Davies of XLR8R wrote that "Many of Shepherd's choices are the product of hours spent listening to music, a penchant for the obscure which is to be applauded, but the true art of DJing, as Shepherd exhibits here, lies in making connections between records—not based on genre or bpm, but because together they create the desired mood, tell a particular story, paint a certain picture; whatever the metaphor, it’s a skill not just in playing music, but in listening to it." Crack Magazine's Katy Hawthorne wrote, "It's no surprise that Floating Points' contribution to the Late Night Tales series feels so healing and patient. The DJ, producer, Eglo Records co-founder and actual neuroscientist specialises in fluid, warming electronic music that has become increasingly mind-bending since his 2009 debut J&W Beat."

== Track listing ==
1. "Untitled, Live in Portland" (Excerpt) - Sarah Davachi
2. "Via Láctea" - Carlos Walker
3. "Glowin’" - The Rationals
4. "Chains" - William S. Fischer
5. "Equipoise" - Max Roach
6. "Blood of an American" - Bobby Wright
7. "Express Your Love" - Sweet & Innocent
8. "A Message Especially From God" - Robert Vanderbilt & The Foundation of Souls
9. "Gentle Man" - The Defaulters
10. "Sun Blues" - Allain Bellaïche
11. "Sea Fluorescent" - Allain Bellaïche
12. "Moments In Love" (Excerpt) - Kara-Lis Coverdale
13. "The Tunnel" - Azimuth
14. "Milk" (Excerpt) - Kaitlyn Aurelia Smith
15. "Nimb No. 59" - Toshimaru Nakamura
16. "The Sweet Time Suite, Pt. 1-Opening" - Floating Points
17. "Ah! Why, Because The Dazzling Sun" (Exclusive Emily Brontë Spoken Word Piece) - Lauren Laverne
