= Bunriha no Natsu =

Studio album by Nariaki Obukuro
- Released: April 25, 2018
- Recorded: 2017–2018
- Genres: J-pop; soul; R&B
- Labels: Epic; Sony Music Japan
- Producers: Hikaru Utada (exec.); Obukuro Nariaki

Singles from Hatsukoi
- 1. "Lonely One" Released: January 17, 2018 (streaming); 2. "Selfish" Released: March 4, 2018 (digital download)

Bunriha no Natsu (分離派の夏;, Bunriha no Natsu; lit. "Summer of Secession") is the debut studio album by Japanese recording artist and producer Nariaki Obukuro, released on April 25, 2018 as his first solo album, under Sony Music Japan sublabel Epic Records Japan. The album was produced by Japanese-American singer songwriter Hikaru Utada.

== Promotion ==
In order to promote the album, Obukuro performed in several TV shows and musical events. Many interviews were done to magazines and internet websites.

== Track listing ==
No.	Title	Lyrics	Music	Length
1.	"042616 @London"	Nariaki Obukuro	Nariaki Obukuro	2:10
2.	"Game"	Obukuro	Obukuro	4:14
3.	"E. Primavesi"	Obukuro	Obukuro	4:30
4.	"Daydreaming in Guam"	Obukuro	Obukuro	3:22
5.	"Selfish"	Obukuro	Obukuro	4:37
6.	"101117 @El Camino de Santiago"	Obukuro	Obukuro	3:14
7.	"Summer Reminds Me"	Obukuro	Obukuro	2:58
8.	"GOODBOY"	Obukuro, Shinji Sakamoto	Obukuro, Shinji Sakamoto	2:48
9.	"Lonely One feat. Hikaru Utada"	Nariaki Obukuro, Hikaru Utada, Yaffle	Nariaki Obukuro, Hikaru Utada, Yaffle	4:39
10.	"Saikai"	Obukuro	Obukuro	4:10
11.	"Myogadani Nite"	Obukuro	Obukuro	0:42
12.	"Natsu no Yume"	Obukuro	Obukuro	3:15
13.	"Kadode"	Obukuro	Obukuro	3:09
14.	"Ai no Zenshin"	Obukuro	Obukuro	5:27

== Charts ==
Chart (2018)	Peak position
Oricon	38
Billboard Japan	22
