= Stillness, Softness... =

Studio album by Hinako Omori
- Released: 27 October 2023
- Length: 40:14
- Label: Houndstooth
- Producer: Hinako Omori

Hinako Omori chronology
| In Parallel (2017) | Stillness, Softness... (2023) |

Stillness, Softness... is the second studio album by Japanese musician Hinako Omori, released on 27 October 2023 through Houndstooth. It received positive reviews from critics.

== Critical reception ==
Professional ratings
Aggregate scores
| Source | Rating |
|---|---|
| Metacritic | 72/100 |
Review scores
| Source | Rating |
| Clash | 8/10 |
| The Skinny | 4/5 stars |
| Sputnikmusic | 4/5 stars |
| Uncut | 6/10 |

Stillness, Softness... received a score of 72 out of 100 on review aggregator Metacritic based on four critics' reviews, indicating "generally favorable" reception. Clash's Nick Roseblade wrote that Omori has "crafted some serious pop songs interspersed with slightly abstract instrumentals. This combination works incredibly well. Also, the decision to have everything flow, overrun and mix into each other [...] gives the album the illusion of being a continuous piece of music, rather than 13 separate pieces". Rhys Morgan of The Skinny called it "rhythmic, meditative, and binaural. It juxtaposes scattered, icier melodies with altogether warmer and lusher chords which swell to quell the melodic sparsity, aided by Omori's increased vocal presence". A staff reviewer from Sputnikmusic opined that "the depth and contour furnished by these ominous undertones prove a valuable foil against the album's central appeal: this record is straightforwardly, enchantingly gorgeous". Uncut felt it is "less effectively soothing than 2022's A Journey..., its unconventionally beguiling, more ambient predecessor".

== Track listing ==
Stillness, Softness... track listing
| No. | Title | Length |
|---|---|---|
| 1. | "Both Directions ?" | 2:22 |
| 2. | "Ember" | 2:27 |
| 3. | "Stalactites" | 1:23 |
| 4. | "Cyanotype Memories" | 3:25 |
| 5. | "In Limbo" | 2:56 |
| 6. | "Epigraph..." | 1:48 |
| 7. | "Foundation" | 6:04 |
| 8. | "In Full Bloom" | 3:08 |
| 9. | "A Structure" | 4:12 |
| 10. | "Astral" | 2:19 |
| 11. | "An Ode to Your Heart" | 3:06 |
| 12. | "Epilogue..." | 3:02 |
| 13. | "Stillness, Softness" | 4:02 |
| Total length: | | 40:14 |
