= Promises (Floating Points, Pharoah Sanders and the London Symphony Orchestra album) =

2021 album

Studio album by Floating Points, Pharoah Sanders and the London Symphony Orchestra
- Released: 26 March 2021
- Recorded: 2019–2020
- Studios: Sargent Recorders (Los Angeles, California); AIR (London, England)
- Genre: Minimalism
- Length: 46:33
- Label: Luaka Bop
- Producer: Floating Points

Floating Points chronology
Crush (2019)	Promises (2021)	Cascade (2024)

Pharoah Sanders chronology
Live in Paris (1975) (Lost ORTF Recordings) (2020)	Promises (2021)

Promises is a 2021 studio album by the British electronic musician Floating Points, the American jazz saxophonist Pharoah Sanders and the London Symphony Orchestra. It was released on 26 March 2021 through the New York label Luaka Bop. It consists of a single 46-minute composition noted for its "dreamlike" quality. The album has received acclaim from music critics, and was shortlisted for the 2021 Mercury Prize. Promises was the final album Sanders released before his death in 2022.

== Background and recording ==
Sam Shepherd, a British DJ, musician and producer, has produced numerous projects in the field of electronic music under the name Floating Points. The previous Floating Points album, Crush, was released in 2019. For Pharoah Sanders, Promises was the first studio album he had released in over a decade, and the last before his death the next year.

Sanders became aware of Shepherd's work in 2015 when he was impressed by the debut Floating Points album Elaenia. Sanders was 75 years old at the time. He later befriended Shepherd, who is 40 years his junior, over lunch and, eventually, proposed that the two of them produce a collaborative album. Shepherd composed the music and played numerous electronic and non-electronic instruments. He further enlisted the London Symphony Orchestra to perform arrangements he had written. The album was primarily recorded at Sargent Recorders in Los Angeles, California in the summer of 2019. The strings were recorded by the London Symphony Orchestra at AIR Studios in London in the summer of 2020, during the COVID-19 pandemic. The orchestra included violins, violas, cellos, and double basses.

== Composition ==
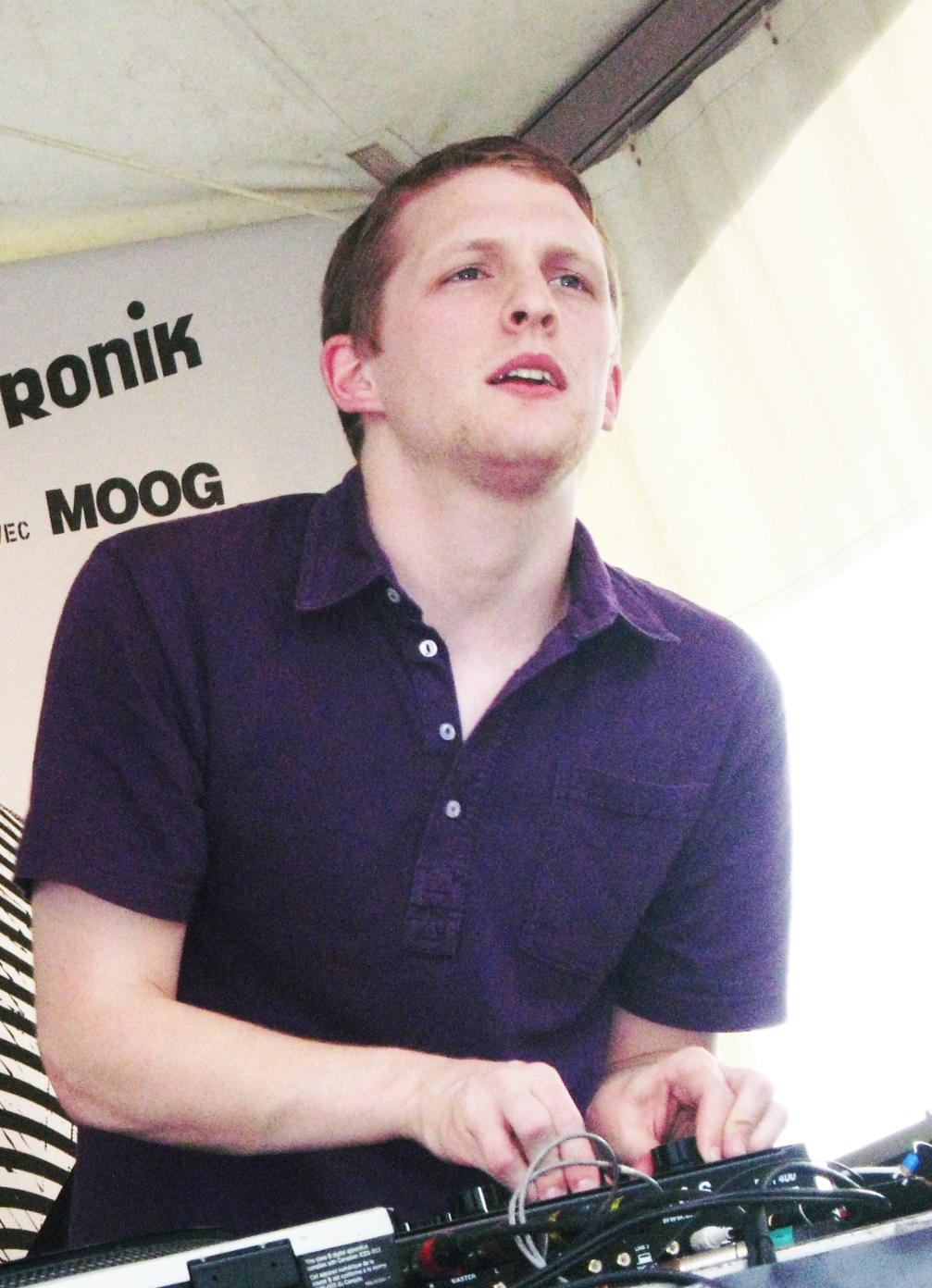
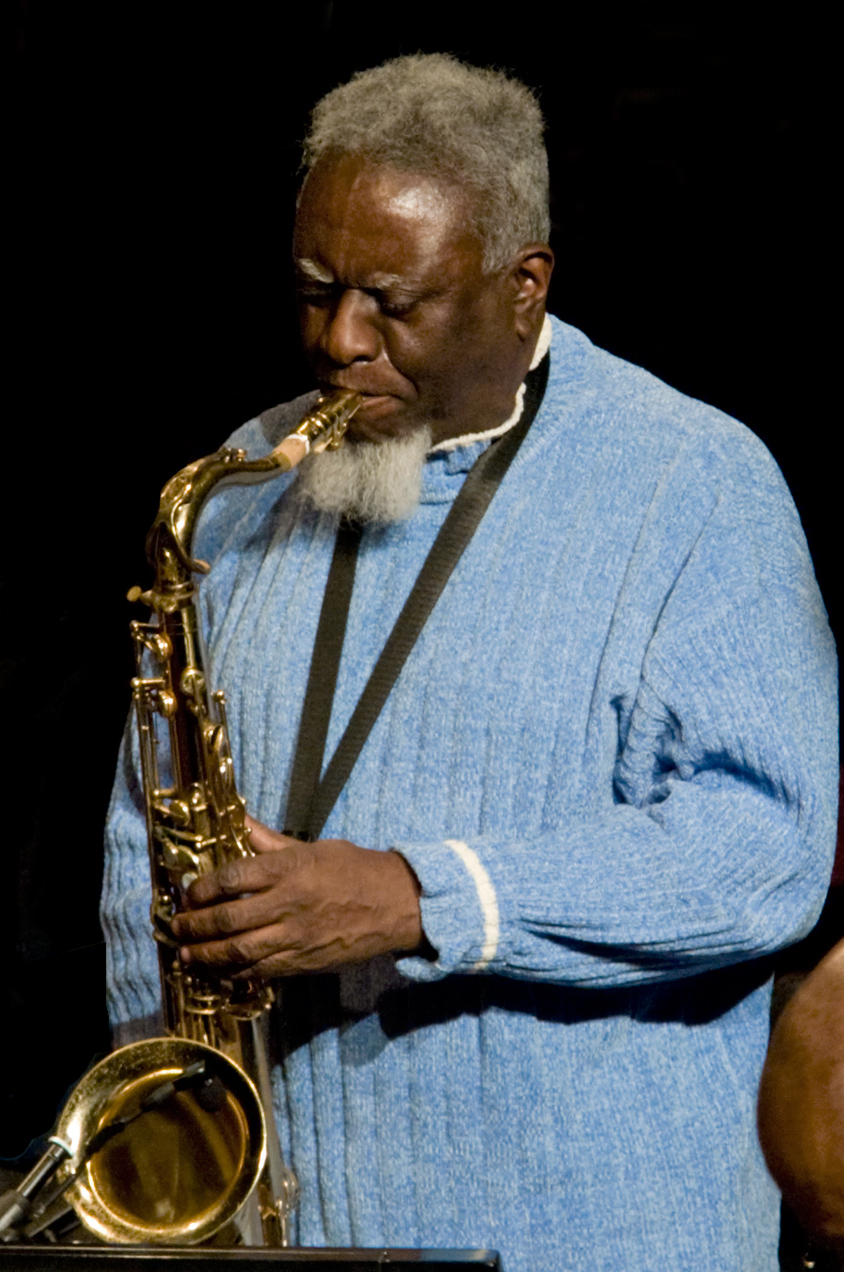
Sam Shepherd (left) and Pharoah Sanders (right)

Promises has been called an ambient record, and noted for its "dreamlike" quality. The album consists of a single musical composition written by Sam Shepherd, divided into nine movements. The piece begins with its central motif: a short pattern of notes played by Shepherd on synthesiser, piano and harpsichord. The motif is repeated throughout the piece in variations. It is compounded with a sparse backdrop of synthetic arrangements from Shepherd, particularly synthesiser. The background is also populated by Sanders's atmospheric tenor saxophone passages, which vary in intensity and are positioned sparingly throughout. In the fourth movement, Sanders uses his voice to vocalize wordless passages. Sanders's saxophone concludes its presence at the end of the seventh movement.

String arrangements performed by the London Symphony Orchestra appear in this instrumental conversation between Shepherd and Sanders. In the sixth movement, the strings reach their climax with rising crescendos that overpower the mix; the orchestra then dissipates into the background at the movement's conclusion. Shepherd and Sanders resume their running performance, veering into an "abstract psychedelia" direction. The central motif ultimately fades from the mix during the eighth movement. After a series of false endings, the piece finally concludes with its ninth movement.

The album has been compared to Sanders's 1971 album Black Unity, which similarly consists of a single musical composition. It has been classified as a piece of minimalist composition.

== Live performance ==
On 20 September 2023, Floating Points debuted Promises for its world-premiere performance at the Hollywood Bowl in Los Angeles. A one-time concert, it featured guest artists including Shabaka Hutchings, Four Tet, Caribou, the Los Angeles Studio Orchestra, Kara-Lis Coverdale, Hinako Omori, Jeffrey Makinson, John Escreet, Lara Serafin and Sun Ra Arkestra.

== Film ==
On 24 April 2021, the film Promises: Through Congress premiered at the Whitney Museum in New York City. Directed by Trevor Tweeten, the film plays the composition in its entirety over views of Julie Mehretu's painting Congress (2003), which was also used in the album's cover art. Sam Shepherd was familiar with the painting, and would "refer" to it while working on the composition. On the film, Shepherd said, "I wanted to perpetuate this idea of being centred in the middle of the painting with its details swirling around you and this film is an extrapolation of that idea, of being in the middle of this perfect storm which only slowly reveals itself."

On 1 November 2022, the film was made available to stream in the United States by The Criterion Channel.

== Critical reception ==
Professional ratings
Aggregate scores
Source	Rating
AnyDecentMusic?	8.8/10
Metacritic	86/100
Review scores
Source	Rating
AllMusic	3.5/5 stars
Clash	9/10
Exclaim!	9/10
Financial Times	5/5 stars
Loud and Quiet	10/10
Mojo	4/5 stars
MusicOMH	5/5 stars
The Observer	5/5 stars
Pitchfork	9.0/10
Uncut	7/10

Promises was met with acclaim. At Metacritic, which assigns a normalised rating out of 100 from reviews from professional critics, the album received a score of 86, based on 20 reviews. Aggregator AnyDecentMusic? gave it 8.8 out of 10, based on their assessment of the critical consensus.

Chiara Wilkinson of The Quietus called Promises a "celebration of sound at its finest and most pure: from the smallest scratch to cathartic crescendos, from spiralling improv to contemplative silences. Every note, whisper, bleep, and shift is significant. It is marvellously multifaceted but never obnoxious: a refreshing, one-of-a-kind conversation between jazz, classical, and electronic." Kitty Empire of The Observer gave the album a perfect score, calling it a "breathtaking" album that transcends the collaborators' usual genres. Mark Richardson of Pitchfork called it "a clear late-career masterpiece" for Sanders. Daniel Sylvester of Exclaim! wrote that Sanders and Shepherd were "so metaphysically in tune with their latest creation that their respective musical personalities almost disappear into the waves of sound, making Promises a recording that is more of a transcending mind meld than it is a collaboration." John Mulvey of Mojo compared the album to Henryk Górecki's symphonies and to Alice Coltrane's World Galaxy, calling it a "subtly sophisticated piece" that "creates space for Sanders to showcase his tender, measured, lyrical phrasing, abstracted scatting and [...] a brief sputtering blast of free saxophone energy that proves, at 80, his fire remains potent. Stephen Dalton of Uncut called it an "impressive collision of talents" but concluded that it was "frustratingly slight" and overall a minor addition to both artists' discographies.

=== Year-end lists ===
Year-end lists for Promises
Publication	List	Rank	Ref.
BBC Radio 6 Music	Albums of the Year 2021	8	
Exclaim!	50 Best Albums of 2021	7	
The Guardian	The 50 best albums of 2021	23	
Mojo	The 75 Best Albums of 2021	1	
NPR Music	The 50 Best Albums of 2021	6	
Paste	The 50 Best Albums of 2021	1	
Pitchfork	The 50 Best Albums of 2021	4	
The Sunday Times	25 best albums of 2021	12	
Time	The 10 Best Albums of 2021	1	
Uncut	The Top 75 Albums of the Year	2	

== Track listing ==
All tracks are written by Sam Shepherd.

=== Vinyl edition ===
Side A
No.	Title	Length
1.	"Promises (Movements 1–5)"	18:40

Side B
No.	Title	Length
1.	"Promises (Movements 6–9)"	27:51

=== CD and digital edition ===
No.	Title	Length
1.	"Movement 1"	6:24
2.	"Movement 2"	2:31
3.	"Movement 3"	2:32
4.	"Movement 4"	2:31
5.	"Movement 5"	4:25
6.	"Movement 6"	8:50
7.	"Movement 7"	9:28
8.	"Movement 8"	7:22
9.	"Movement 9"	2:30
Total length:		46:33

== Personnel ==
Credits adapted from the album's liner notes.

=== Music ===
- Sam Shepherd – piano, harpsichord, celesta, Fender Rhodes, Hammond B3, Oberheim Four Voice, Oberheim OB-Xa, Solina String Ensemble, Therevox ET-4.3, EMS Synthi, ARP 2600, Buchla 200e, string writing, string arrangements
- Pharoah Sanders – tenor saxophone, voice
- London Symphony Orchestra – strings
- Sally Herbert – LSO conductor
- Carmine Lauri – LSO lead
- Olli Cunningham – score preparation
- Colin Rae – score preparation

=== Technical ===
- Sam Shepherd – mixing
- Tim Pennells – assistant mixing
- John Prestage – recording (AIR)
- Ashley Andrew-Jones – assistant recording (AIR)
- Gianluca Massimo – assistant recording (AIR)
- Jeremy Murphy – engineering (AIR)
- Sean Cook – engineering (Sargent)
- Chris Bellman – lacquer cut
- Yale Evelev – executive production
- Eric Welles-Nyström – executive production

=== Artwork ===
- Julie Mehretu – cover artwork
- Eric Welles-Nyström – photos in Los Angeles
- Shawn Johnson – photos from London
- Paul Diddy – design, layout

== Charts ==
=== Weekly charts ===
Chart performance for Promises
Chart (2021)	Peak position
Belgian Albums (Ultratop Flanders)	18
Belgian Albums (Ultratop Wallonia)	47
German Albums (Offizielle Top 100)	53
Portuguese Albums (AFP)	22
Swedish Physical Albums (Sverigetopplistan)	14
Swiss Albums (Schweizer Hitparade)	46
UK Albums (Official Charts)	6
UK Independent Albums (Official Charts)	1

=== Year-end charts ===
Chart (2021)	Position
Australian Jazz and Blues Albums (ARIA)	37
