= Crush (Floating Points album) =

Studio album by Floating Points
- Released: 18 October 2019
- Genre: Electronic
- Length: 44:01
- Label: Ninja Tune
- Producer: Sam Shepherd

Floating Points chronology
Late Night Tales: Floating Points (2019)	Crush (2019)	Promises (2021)

Singles from Crush
- 1. "LesAlpx" Released: 18 June 2019; 2. "Bias" Released: April 7, 2020

Crush is the second studio album by British electronic musician Sam Shepherd, released under his alias Floating Points on 18 October 2019 by Ninja Tune.

== Background and recording ==
Shepherd began work on the album following a 2017 tour with the xx. Taking inspiration from German krautrock band Harmonia's 2007 album Live 1974, Shepherd played 30 minute improvisational sets using only a Buchla synthesizer and a Korg drum machine. Upon his return to the studio, Shepherd used the same equipment as the basis for recording and completed the album in five weeks. Unlike the debut Floating Points album Elaenia (2015), Crush does not feature any live guitars or drums.

== Critical reception ==
Professional ratings
Aggregate scores
Source	Rating
AnyDecentMusic?	7.8/10
Metacritic	81/100
Review scores
Source	Rating
AllMusic	4/5 stars
DIY	4/5 stars
Exclaim!	7/10
Financial Times	4/5 stars
The Independent	4/5 stars
Mojo	3/5 stars
The Observer	4/5 stars
Pitchfork	8.3/10
Q	4/5 stars
Uncut	8/10

Crush received positive reception upon release. At Metacritic, which assigns a normalized rating out of 100 to reviews from music publications, the album received an average score of 81 based on 16 reviews, indicating "universal acclaim". Shawn Reynaldo of Pitchfork awarded the album "Best New Music", saying that the project is "an album of mischievous, melodic, stripped-down electronic music". Dylan Barnabe at Exclaim! noted that although "the sonic explorations undermine the album's overall cohesiveness, Crush remains a shining example of Shepherd's growth as an artist". In a mixed review, John Mulvey of Mojo thought that the project was "a decent album, but perhaps not the one some of us were hoping for.".

=== Accolades ===
Publication	Accolade	Rank	Ref.
The A.V. Club	Top 20 Albums of 2019	17	
DJ Mag	Top 50 Albums of 2019	25	
The Independent	Top 50 Albums of 2019	25	
Loud and Quiet	Top 40 Albums of 2019	9	
Mixmag	Top 50 Albums of 2019	2	
Pitchfork	The 50 Best Albums of 2019	50	
The Vinyl Factory	Top 50 Albums of 2019	22	

== Track listing ==
All tracks written and produced by Sam Shepherd. Credits adapted from Apple Music and Tidal.

No.	Title	Length
1.	"Falaise"	3:54
2.	"Last Bloom"	5:53
3.	"Anasickmodular"	3:12
4.	"Requiem for CS70 and Strings"	2:23
5.	"Karakul"	1:54
6.	"LesAlpx"	4:41
7.	"Bias"	5:08
8.	"Environments"	4:45
9.	"Birth"	3:00
10.	"Sea-Watch"	4:04
11.	"Apoptose, Pt. I"	2:35
12.	"Apoptose, Pt. II"	2:27
Total length:		44:01

== Charts ==
Chart (2019)	Peak position
Australian Digital Albums (ARIA)	33
Belgian Albums (Ultratop Flanders)	163
Scottish Albums (OCC)	20
UK Albums (OCC)	37
