= Lonely One =

Single by Nariaki Obukuro featuring Hikaru Utada

from the album Bunriha no Natsu
- Released: 17 January 2018
- Genre: J-pop; R&B; PBR&B
- Length: 4:41
- Label: Epic Records Japan
- Songwriter(s): Nariaki Obukuro; Hikaru Utada; Youki Kojima
- Producer(s): Hikaru Utada

Nariaki Obukuro singles chronology
"Lonely One" (2018)	"Selfish" (2018)

Hikaru Utada singles chronology
"Anata" (2017)	"Lonely One" (2018)	"Play a Love Song" (2018)

"Lonely One" is a song by Japanese singer-songwriter Nariaki Obukuro, featuring Japanese-American singer-songwriter Hikaru Utada. The song was released on 17 January 2018 as the first single from Obukuro's debut studio album.

== Track listing ==
No.	Title	Length
1.	"Lonely One" (featuring Hikaru Utada)	4:41

== Credits and personnel ==
- Nariaki Obukuro – songwriting, vocals
- Hikaru Utada – production, songwriting, vocals
- Youki Kojima – songwriting

== Charts ==
Chart (2018)	Peak position
Japan Viral 50 (Spotify)	1

== Release history ==
Region	Date	Format	Label	Ref.
Japan	17 January 2018	Streaming	Epic Records Japan	
