= Hinako Omori =

Japanese-British musician

- 大森日向子
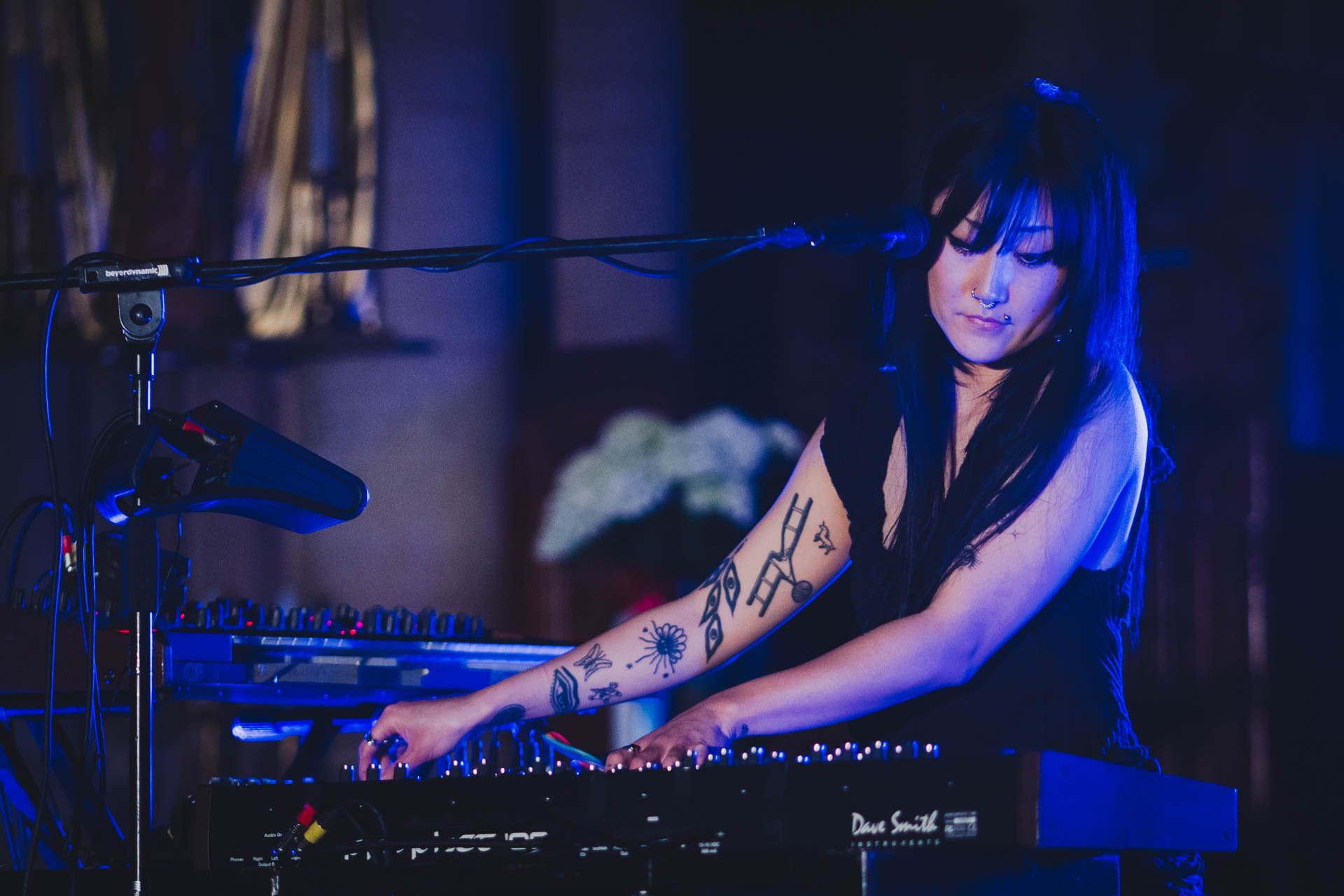
- Omori performing at TGE in 2023
- Born: Yokohama, Japan
- Education: University of Surrey (BSc), 2011
- Occupations: Composer; Performer; Producer
- Musical career
- Origin: UK
- Genres: ambient; avant-garde; minimalism
- Years active: 2019–present
- Label: Houndstooth
- Website: www.hinakoomori.com

Hinako Omori (大森日向子, Omori Hinako) is a Japanese singer and composer based in London.

== Early life and education ==
Omori was born in Yokohama, Japan. She moved to London at three years of age.

She began playing the piano at five years old, and was first introduced to electronic music listening to The Knife, whom she cites as an inspiration to start writing music and experimenting with synthesizers. Omori completed her A-levels at Reigate College and earned a Bachelor of Science in Music and Sound Recording (Tonmeister) from University of Surrey in 2011.

== Career ==
After university, Omori worked as a session musician for artists such as James Bay, Ed O'Brien, Kae Tempest, and KT Tunstall.

Omori released her first solo single, Voyage, in May 2019, followed shortly after by her first EP, Auraelia, in November 2019. Invited to participate in WOMAD at Home's online festival in 2020, Omori took inspiration from the Japanese concept of shinrin-yoku, or "forest bathing", recording environmental sounds in the woodlands around her home & studio to incorporate with binaural sounds to create an immersive auditory environment for her set. That performance helped propel Omori into the spotlight as a solo artist and would be expanded in her debut full-length album, A journey…, released by Houndstooth in 2022.

Inspired by Hiroshi Yoshimura and Susumu Yokota, Omori first experimented with a Roland SH-101, loaned to her by her teacher at Reigate. Recent recordings feature the use of analog synths including the Oberheim OB-6, Prophet '08, and Moog Matriarch, along with OTO BIM and BAM pedals and a Pigtronix Infinity Looper. Omori has also played a Wurlitzer on KT Tunstall's album Wax and a celesta with Floating Points.

== Discography ==
=== Albums ===
- A Journey... (2022)
- Stillness, Softness... (2023)

=== EPs ===
- Auraelia (2019)

=== Singles ===
- "Voyage" (2019)
- "Snow" (2022)
- "The Richest Garden in Your Memory" (2022)

== Selected live performances ==
=== 2022 ===
- Hinako Omori x London Contemporary Orchestra – London, 19 March 2022
- Visions Festival – London, 23 July 2022
- Amsterdam Dance Event – Amsterdam, 20 October 2022
- Música Internacional de Lisboa – Lisbon, 30 October 2022
- Le Guess Who? – Utrecht, November 2022

=== 2023 ===
- Piano Day at the National Gallery – London, 31 March 2023
- The Great Escape Festival – Brighton, 12 May 2023
- Unclassified Live w/ BBC Concert Orchestra – London, 19 May
- Promises with Floating Points – Hollywood Bowl, 20 September 2023
- Stillness, Softness… EU Tour – Ourense, Paris, Brighton, Leeds, Manchester, London, Amsterdam, Copenhagen, Berlin, Brussels, November–December 2023
