= Bad Mode =

- Digital and standard cover

Studio album by Hikaru Utada
- Released: January 19, 2022
- Recorded: 2018–2021
- Genres: Pop; R&B; dance-pop; electronica
- Length: 73:42
- Languages: Japanese; English
- Labels: Epic Japan; Sony Japan
- Producers: Hikaru Utada; A. G. Cook; Floating Points; Nariaki Obukuro; Poo Bear; Skrillex

Hikaru Utada chronology
One Last Kiss (2021)	Bad Mode (2022)	Hikaru Utada Live Sessions from Air Studios (2022)

Singles from Bad Mode
- 1. "Face My Fears" Released: January 18, 2019; 2. "Time" Released: May 8, 2020; 3. "Dare ni mo Iwa Nai" Released: May 22, 2020; 4. "One Last Kiss" Released: March 9, 2021; 5. "Pink Blood" Released: June 8, 2021; 6. "Kimi ni Muchū" Released: November 26, 2021; 7. "Bad Mode" Released: January 19, 2022

Bad Mode (Japanese: BADモード, Hepburn: Baddo Mōdo) is the eleventh studio album and eighth Japanese language album by Japanese-American singer-songwriter Hikaru Utada. It is Utada's first bilingual album release, with songs recorded in both Japanese and English. The album was released on the Sony Music Japan sublabel Epic Records Japan digitally on January 19, 2022, and was released physically on February 23. It marked their first album release in four years since Hatsukoi (2018).

Six previously released songs were confirmed for the album, including title track "Bad Mode", the Shiseido commercial theme song "Find Love", the Evangelion: 3.0+1.0 Thrice Upon a Time theme song "One Last Kiss" and the Kingdom Hearts III theme song "Face My Fears". The album includes collaborations with a variety of producers, including Skrillex and Poo Bear, A. G. Cook, and Sam Shepherd. Describing the record's themes, MTV wrote that Bad Mode is largely about "growing up, self-love, self-partnering, and acceptance". It utilizes various musical styles including pop, jazz, electronica and R&B.

Bad Mode received critical acclaim from music critics, with The Japan Times calling it a career highlight. It was named one of the best albums of the year by various music publications including Pitchfork and Slant Magazine, while "Somewhere Near Marseilles" was ranked within the top 10 on both publication's lists of Best Songs of 2022. Commercially, the album received a gold certification from the Recording Industry Association of Japan (RIAJ) within a month of its release with over 100,000 copies sold.

== Background and packaging ==
Two physical versions of Bad Mode were released: a standard audio CD, and a limited edition CD/DVD/Blu-ray bundle that includes the regular audio CD, five music videos ("Time", "One Last Kiss", "Pink Blood", "Kimi ni Muchū" and "Bad Mode"), and the full recorded concert Hikaru Utada Live Sessions from Air Studios. The concert was recorded at London's Air Studios, with bassist Jodi Milliner as the bandmaster. Sound engineer Steve Fitzmaurice worked in sound recording and mixing, and David Barnard in the video direction. Hikaru Utada's son, who was six years old at the time of the album's release, participated in the album, having violin credits in "Bad Mode" and vocal credits in "Not in the Mood" under the name The Artist's Son. He also appears on the album cover.

== Composition ==
In contrast to their past albums, Bad Mode revolves around Utada's relationship with themself. They state that most of the songs were written during the COVID-19 pandemic and containing reflections on being a mother, surviving through difficult times, and working to improve their own state of being and relationships with other people. In writing the songs, Utada drew inspiration from the show RuPaul's Drag Race, explaining that its message "if you can’t love yourself, how are you going to love somebody else?" was meaningful to them. They also explained that they learned a great deal from using live instrumentation on their previous albums Fantôme (2016) and Hatsukoi (2018), and expressed a desire to create "something sonically very weird again", as with their past album Exodus (2004).

== Promotion ==
Despite having no tour to promote the album, Utada performed for the first time in the famous Coachella Valley Music and Arts Festival on April 17, 2022, being a part of the 88rising label block, singing some old hits and "Face My Fears" from Bad Mode, and a new song called "T", released after the concert ended for streaming, in 88rising's EP Head in the Clouds Forever. In response to fan requests, the concert Hikaru Utada Live Sessions from Air Studios was released on June 9, 2022, for streaming on Netflix as Utada's first digital live album.

In September 2022, Utada performed "Somewhere Near Marseilles" live at the Yokohama Hakkeijima Sea Paradise zoo. An accompanying video of the performance was released exclusively on Spotify as part of their five-year anniversary celebration of the service launching in Japan.

Professional ratings
Review scores
Source	Rating
The Japan Times	5/5 stars
Pitchfork	8.0/10
PopMatters	8/10
Sputnikmusic	3.5/5 stars

== Accolades ==
Bad Mode on critic lists
Critic/Publisher	List	Ranking	Ref.
Beats Per Minute	Top 50 Albums of 2022	37	
Gorilla vs. Bear	Top 50 Albums of 2022	19	
NME	The 25 best Asian albums of 2022	8	
NPR (Lars Gotrich)	Top 10 Albums of 2022	Placed	
NPR (Sheldon Pearce)	Top Albums of 2022	Placed	
Pitchfork	The 50 Best Albums of 2022	31	
The Skinny	Top Albums of 2022	17	
Slant Magazine	The 50 Best Albums of 2022	9	
Tokyo Weekender	Top 10 Best Japanese Albums of 2022	9	

Songs from Bad Mode on critic lists
Critic/Publisher	List	Song	Ranking	Ref.
Gorilla vs. Bear	Top 50 Songs of 2022	"Somewhere Near Marseilles"	5	
Pitchfork	The 100 Best Songs of 2022	"Somewhere Near Marseilles"	10	
Resident Advisor	The Best Tracks of 2022	"Somewhere Near Marseilles"	Placed	
Slant Magazine	The 50 Best Songs of 2022	"Somewhere Near Marseilles"	6	
The Fader	The 100 Best Songs of 2022	"Somewhere Near Marseilles"	42	
NPR	The 100 Best Songs of 2022	"Bad Mode"	32	
Pitchfork	The 100 Best Songs of the 2020s So Far	"Somewhere Near Marseilles"	18	

== Track listing ==
All tracks are written by Hikaru Utada except where noted.

Bad Mode – Standard edition
No.	Title	Producer(s)	Length
1.	"Bad Mode" (BADモード) (written by Utada, Jodi Milliner)	Utada; Sam Shepherd	5:03
2.	"Kimi ni Muchū" (君に夢中)	Utada; A. G. Cook	4:18
3.	"One Last Kiss"	Utada; Cook	4:10
4.	"Pink Blood"	Utada; Nariaki Obukuro	3:17
5.	"Time"	Utada; Obukuro	4:58
6.	"Not in the Mood" (気分じゃないの)	Utada; Shepherd	7:28
7.	"Darenimo Iwanai" (誰にも言わない)	Utada; Obukuro	4:40
8.	"Find Love"	Utada; Obukuro	4:38
9.	"Face My Fears" (Japanese version) (written by Utada, Skrillex, Jason "Poo Bear" Boyd)	Utada; Skrillex; Poo Bear	3:38
10.	"Somewhere Near Marseilles" (Somewhere Near Marseilles -マルセイユ辺り-)	Utada; Shepherd	11:55
Total length:			54:05

Bad Mode – bonus tracks
No.	Title	Producer(s)	Length
11.	"Beautiful World (Da Capo Version)"	Utada; Nariaki Obukuro	5:58
12.	"Kireina Hito (Find Love)" (キレイな人)	Utada; Obukuro	4:38
13.	"Face My Fears (English Version)"	Utada; Skrillex	3:39
14.	"Face My Fears (A. G. Cook Remix)"	Utada; Cook	5:22
Total length:			73:42

== Personnel ==
Musicians

- Hikaru Utada – production (1–13), writing (all tracks), vocals (all tracks), keyboards, programming (1–5, 7, 8, 10, 12); piano (1), additional drum programming (9, 13), additional keyboards and programming (11), shaker (10), Korean WaveDrum (10), vocals recording (1–3, 6–8, 10, 12)
- Nariaki Obukuro – production, keyboards (5, 7, 8, 11, 12); programming (5, 7, 8, 11, 12), vocals recording (11)
- Sam Shepherd – production, keyboards, programming (1, 6, 10); Rhodes piano (1), piano (6)
- A. G. Cook – production (2, 3, 14), keyboards (3), programming (2, 3), remix (14)
- Skrillex – production, programming (9, 13); writing (9, 13, 14), mixing (9, 13)
- Poo Bear – production (9, 13), writing (9, 13, 14)
- Jodi Milliner – writing (1), bass (1, 4, 6, 11, 13), synth bass (2, 3, 9), Moog bass & Juno pad (5)
- Ben Parker – guitar (1, 6, 7), acoustic guitar (11)
- Reuben James – Wurlitzer piano (4), acoustic piano (9, 13), piano (11)
- Will Fry – percussion (1, 7, 10)
- Leo Taylor – drums (1)
- Ash Soan – percussion (6)
- Freddie Gavita – trumpet (1)
- Soweto Kinch – saxophone
- Chris Dave – percussion (9, 13)
- Yuta Bandoh – string arrangement, conducting (11)
- Ensemble FOVE – strings (11)
- Darren Heelis – additional drum programming (5)
- Tom Norris – additional drum programming (9, 13), mixing (9, 13)
- Nobuaki Tanaka – additional programming (11)
- The Artist's Son – violin (1), vocals (6)

Technical

- Steve Fitzmaurice – recording (1, 3, 4, 6, 7, 11), mixing (1–8, 10–12), additional instrumental recording (9)
- Masahito Komori – vocals recording (4, 5, 9), strings recording (11), vocal tracks editing (4)
- Yuya Saito – vocal tracks editing (1–8, 10–12)
- Darren Heelis – additional recording (5), vocal recording assistance, additional engineering (7)
- Marek Deml – recording, additional vocals recording (4)
- Matt Jones – additional engineering assistance (7)
- Randy Merrill – mastering

== Charts ==
=== Weekly charts ===
Weekly chart performance for Bad Mode
Chart (2022)	Peak position
Japanese Albums (Oricon)	1
Japanese Hot Albums (Billboard Japan)	1
UK Album Downloads (Official Charts)	83

=== Monthly charts ===
Monthly chart performance for Bad Mode
Chart (2022)	Peak position
Japanese Albums (Oricon)	1

=== Year-end charts ===
Year-end chart performance for Bad Mode
Chart (2022)	Position
Japanese Albums (Oricon)	26
Japanese Hot Albums (Billboard Japan)	16

== Sales and certifications ==
Region	Certification	Certified units/sales
Japan (RIAJ)	Gold	166,698

== Release history ==
Release dates and formats for Bad Mode
Region	Date	Format	Label	Ref.
Various	January 19, 2022	Digital download; streaming	Epic; Sony Music Japan	
Various	February 23, 2022	CD	Epic; Sony Music Japan	
Various	April 27, 2022	LP	Epic; Sony Music Japan	
