= Nariaki Obukuro =

Nariaki Obukuro 小袋成彬
- Also known as: OBKR
- Born: 30 April 1991 (age 35)
- Origin: Japan
- Genres: R&B; PBR&B; Electronic; Experimental music
- Years active: 2013—present
- Labels: Tokyo Recordings; Epic Records; Sony Music Japan
- Website: obukuro.com

Nariaki Obukuro (小袋成彬, Nariaki Obukuro; born 30 April 1991), also known as OBKR, is a Japanese singer, songwriter, and producer. Along with Yaffle, he is a co-founding member Tokyo Recordings. He is responsible for producing songs for acts like Wednesday Campanella, Kou Shibasaki, and other famous acts. His music combines musical elements of the R&B, PBR&B, Electronic and experimental tones genres. In 2018, it was revealed that he would make his solo debut as a singer and songwriter under Sony Music's Epic Records label. The album is co-produced by famed Japanese-American singer-songwriter Hikaru Utada.

== Life and career ==
Obukuro's musical career started in 2013, when he formed the duo N.O.R.K. with Ray Kunimoto while they were university students. In the next year, they released the EP ASDR, which consists of PBR&B and experimental electronica sounds. After the duo parted ways, Obukuro decided to launch his own indie label, Tokyo Recordings.

In September 2016, Obukuro gained fame when J-pop singer-songwriter Hikaru Utada released her sixth Japanese album, Fantôme. His vocals are featured in track 6, Tomodachi, an R&B song. He performed with Utada in NHK the song, making it his television debut.

In January 2018, Obukuro announced his major debut under Epic Records, with his debut single featuring Utada. The song, called "Lonely One", was released in streaming services on January 17th, 2018. His debut album, "Bunriha no Natsu", was released in April 2018. A music video for the song "Selfish" was released.

In 2019, Obukuro was featured alongside KEIJU, on the song "Summertime" by RIRI. In the same year, Obukuro was also featured on the song "Cold" by The fin.

On December 13th, 2019, Obukuro released a music video for a shorter version of the song "Gaie". On December 18th, Obukuro released his second studio album "Piercing" featuring artists Kenn Igbi, Tohji & 5lack.

Obukuro released his third studio album Strides on October 13th, 2021. On the same day, a music video for the song "Work" was released. Obukuro went on a tour in the following year supporting the album. A remix version of the album was released in November, 2022. On January 20th, 2023, Obukuro released a music video for the song "Butter"

In December 2024, Obukuro announced his fourth studio album Zatto and their first independent release, to be released on January 15th, 2025. This album features Rosetta Carr, who plays bass in Sampha’s support band, Ayo Sarawu, Kokoroko’s drummer, and the band, who visited Japan for the first time this November. Many musicians active in the London music scene are participating, including Lyle Barton, who is also a support pianist for Nala Sinephro. The mixing engineer was Russell Elevado, known as the Grammy-winning engineer who worked on D’Angelo’s Voodoo and Erykah Badu’s Mama’s Gun. It is said to be an ambitious work that combines multinational music such as jazz, reggae, dub, and Latin with the beauty of the Japanese language. Pre-orders were made available for the limited edition CD case, which will be released on February 26th.

In support of the new album Zatto, Obukuro announced a live tour for the first time in almost 3 years. Starting at Misono Universe in Osaka, the tour will tour five cities: Nagoya, Fukuoka, Hokkaido, and Tokyo.

== Discography ==
=== Albums ===
==== Studio albums ====
List of albums, with selected chart positions
Title	Album details	Peak positions		Sales
Title	Album details	JPN Oricon	JPN Billboard	Sales
Bunriha no Natsu (分離派の夏)	Released: April 25, 2018; Label: Epic Records; Formats: CD, digital download, Streaming	38	22	JPN: 3,300
Piercing	Released: December 18, 2019; Label: Epic Records; Formats: Streaming, digital download, Vinyl	-	-	
Strides	Released: October 13, 2021; Label: Epic Records; Formats: Streaming, digital download, Vinyl	-	-	
Zatto	Released: January 15, 2025; Label: Independent; Formats: CD, Streaming, digital download, Vinyl	-	-	

=== Singles ===
==== As lead artist ====
List of singles
Title	Year	Album
"Lonely One" (featuring Hikaru Utada)	2018	Bunriha no Natsu

==== Promotional singles ====
List of promotional singles, with selected chart positions
Title	Year	Peak chart positions	Album
Title	Year	JPN Hot 100	Album
"Selfish"	2018	69	Bunriha no Natsu
"Summer Reminds Me"	2018	—	Bunriha no Natsu

=== Music videos ===
List of music videos, showing year released and directors
Title	Year	Director(s)	Ref.
"Selfish"	2018	Yusuke Ishida	

=== Other appearances ===
Title	Year	Other artist(s)	Album
"ADD"	2014	XANAX, Jyodan	EP1
"Confessions"	2015	Flammable, VITO	Cosmic Coma
"Doubt"	2016	80KIDZ	5
"Vodka, Lime & Cranberry"	2016	YOSA	ORION
"Yume no Ato (ゆめのあと)"	2016	Tamaki Roy, Taquwami	Nagi (なぎ)
"Tomodachi (ともだち)"	2016	Hikaru Utada	Fantôme
"24"	2017	Mother Tereco	ORACLE
"Neyo (寝よう)"	2018	Giorgio Givvn	Go Outdoor Living: The Moment in the Outdoor Living
"Marunouchi Sadistic (丸の内サディスティック)" (Cover of Ringo Sheena)	2018	Hikaru Utada	Adam to Eve no Ringo (アダムとイヴの林檎)
Summertime	2019	RIRI, KEIJU	Summertime

== Writing and producing credits ==
Year	Artist	Title	Album
2013	N.O.R.K.	"The Fall"	ADSR
2013	N.O.R.K.	"Yell Out"	ADSR
2013	N.O.R.K.	"Offense"	ADSR
2013	N.O.R.K.	"Umbrella"	ADSR
2013	N.O.R.K.	"White Space"	Non-album single
2014	Megumi Wata	"Wakannai"	Sainan Dawa
2014	Megumi Wata	"Sainan Dawa"	Sainan Dawa
2014	Megumi Wata	"Tokyo no Sora wa Kumori"	Sainan Dawa
2014	Megumi Wata	"Tokai"	Sainan Dawa
2014	Megumi Wata	"Gohan"	Sainan Dawa
2014	Megumi Wata	"Mother"	Sainan Dawa
2014	Megumi Wata	"Wakatta"	Sainan Dawa
2014	Megumi Wata	"Tanomuzo Kakumeika, Watashi wa Oyogu"	Sainan Dawa
2014	Megumi Wata	"Monkey George"	Sainan Dawa
2014	Megumi Wata	"Yamanotesen"	Sainan Dawa
2015	Wednesday Campanella	"Napoleon"	Triathlon
2015	Capeson	"Leave You Alone"	Portrait 1 Hiraeth
2015	Capeson	"Latent"	Portrait 1 Hiraeth
2015	Capeson	"Walk Away"	Portrait 1 Hiraeth
2015	Capeson	"Back in the Day"	Portrait 1 Hiraeth
2015	Megumi Wata	"Koi ga Aimai"	Sainan Dawa (Repackaged)
2016	Keishi Tanaka	"Hello, New Kicks"	What's A Trunk?
2016	Megumi Wata	"Blind Man wa Shitteiru"	Blind Man
2016	Megumi Wata	"Kono Machi no Yoru wa Akarui Hoshi Dake ga Kirari"	Blind Man
2016	Megumi Wata	"Blind Man"	Blind Man
2016	Megumi Wata	"Kesshin"	Blind Man
2016	Megumi Wata	"Run! Run! Run!"	Blind Man
2016	Megumi Wata	"Tsuioku"	Blind Man
2016	Megumi Wata	"Invisible Man"	Blind Man
2016	Megumi Wata	"Fluff"	Sainann Dawa (Repackaged)
2016	Kuuchuu Metro	"Δ"	Δ/Boku no Uta
2016	Kuuchuu Metro	"Boku no Uta"	Δ/Boku no Uta
2016	Capeson	"Believe My Eyes"	Hiraeth
2016	Ko Shibasaki	"Soshite Boku wa Toho ni Kureru"	Zoku Ko Utau
2016	Ko Shibasaki	"Tasogare no Begin"	Zoku Ko Utau
2016	Okamoto's	"Rocky"	Non-album single
2016	Capeson	"The Video, It's Not That Old"	Hiraeth
2016	Capeson	"A Tear into the River"	Hiraeth
2016	Capeson	"Bow And Arrow"	Hiraeth
2016	Capeson	"Sunshine	Hiraeth
2016	Capeson	"Track 4, Noisy But"	Hiraeth
2016	Capeson	"Steerman"	Hiraeth
2016	Capeson	"Cry Like a Bird"	Hiraeth
2016	Capeson	"The Ending"	Hiraeth
2016	Awesome City Club	"Cold & Dry"	Awesome City Tracks 4
2016	BŌMI	"Hello the World"	A_B
2016	BŌMI	"A_B"	A_B
2016	BŌMI	"Kioku"	A_B
2016	BŌMI	"Super Girl"	A_B
2016	BŌMI	"Good Night!!"	A_B
2016	BŌMI	"Lonely Lonely"	A_B
2016	BŌMI	"Hatsukoi"	A_B
2016	BŌMI	"They Don't Know"	A_B
2016	BŌMI	"Hutatsu no Machi"	A_B
2016	BŌMI	"Sora wo Tadoreba"	A_B
2017	Seiko Omori	"Pocky wo Tabenagara"	Non-album single
2017	adieu	"Narratage"	Non-album single
2017	adieu	"Hana wa Yureru"	Non-album single
2017	Thylacine	"Yume"	Non-album single
2017	SIRUP	"Synapse"	SIRUP EP
2017	Yaffle	"Backlight" (featuring Linnéa Lundgren)	Go Outdoor Living: The Moment in the Outdoor Living
2017	Keiichi Sokabe	"Kaze to Itawari"	Go Outdoor Living: The Moment in the Outdoor Living
2018	iri	"Corner"	Juice
2018	iri	"Slowly Drive"	Juice
2018	Loza Reena	"Tarareba Ryūseigun"	TBA
2018	Hikaru Utada	"Phakchi no Uta"	Hatsukoi
2018	Hikaru Utada	"Too Proud" (featuring XZT, Suboi, EK (L1 Remix))	Non-album single
2020	Hikaru Utada	"Time"	Bad Mode
2020	Hikaru Utada	"Darenimo Iwanai"	Bad Mode
2021	Hikaru Utada	"Beautiful World - Da Capo Version"	One Last Kiss
2021	Hikaru Utada	"Find Love"	Bad Mode

== Tours ==
- Nariaki Obukuro Oneman Live Fall (2018)

== Awards and nominations ==
Year	Award	Category	Work	Result	Ref.
2018	Short Shorts Film Festival & Asia 2018	Spotlight Award	"Selfish"	Won	
2019	CD Shop Awards 2019	Grand Prix	Bunriha no Natsu	Pending	
2019	Best Alternative Artist	Space Shower Music Awards 2019	Himself	Pending	
