= Elaenia (album) =

Studio album by Floating Points
- Released: 6 November 2015
- Genre: Electronic
- Length: 42:28
- Label: Luaka Bop (US); Pluto (UK)
- Producer: Sam Shepherd

Floating Points chronology
Elaenia (2015)	Reflections – Mojave Desert (2017)

Singles from Elaenia
- 1. "Silhouettes (I, II & III)" Released: August 25, 2015; 2. "Nespole" Released: September 23, 2015; 3. "Peroration Six" Released: October 19, 2015

Elaenia is the debut studio album by British electronic musician Sam Shepherd, released under his alias Floating Points on 6 November 2015 by Shepherd's own Pluto label and Luaka Bop. Shepherd created the artwork for the album by connecting fibre-optic cables to a home made harmonograph. Shepherd had originally conceived the album to contain only one track but was advised against the idea and eventually cut the music into seven songs. Elaenia's title track was named when Shepherd experienced a dream about a bird that became engulfed in a forest after he had been reading the speculative fiction novel Sum: Forty Tales from the Afterlives by American neuroscientist David Eagleman.

== Reception ==
Professional ratings
Aggregate scores
Source	Rating
AnyDecentMusic?	8.1/10
Metacritic	85/100
Review scores
Source	Rating
AllMusic	5/5 stars
Clash	8/10
The Guardian	5/5 stars
Mixmag	8/10
Mojo	4/5 stars
The Observer	4/5 stars
Pitchfork	8.4/10
Q	4/5 stars
Rolling Stone	4/5 stars
Spin	8/10

At Metacritic, which assigns a normalised rating out of 100 to reviews from mainstream critics, Elaenia received an average score of 85, based on 20 reviews, indicating "universal acclaim". It was rated as the best album of 2015 by Resident Advisor and was placed at number 20 on Pitchfork Media's list of albums of the year. XLR8R magazine rated it as the second best release of 2015.

Writing for Pitchfork, Philip Sherburne called Elaenia "rich and welcoming", saying that it was "as warm and fluid an 'electronic' album as you will hear all year". Sherburne praised the album's "timeless feel" and awarded it a "Best New Music" accolade. Sam Walker-Smart of Clash magazine said that it was "a sweeping, majestic debut...that pleases hearts and minds alike" and stated that it was "one of those rare albums that crosses genres and audiences with ease." Walker-Smart concluded his review by saying that "if you've any sense, you'll find a place in your library for this album". AllMusic reviewer Andy Kellman said that some listeners might feel a sense of anticlimax at the "slight" nature of the music in comparison to Shepherd's earlier work, saying that it was "fated to become one of those albums that inspires ritualistic listening parties held by small groups of audiophiles" but noted that "that shouldn't be held against it." Rolling Stone's Ashley Zlatopolsky said that it was "a set that reflects the cutting-edge mechanisms of Shepherd's complex mind" that "confirm[s] him as one of contemporary electronic music's most forward-thinking talents." In his review for PopMatters, Nathan Stevens said that Elaenia was "not without its flaws" and stated that he found the album's length "disappointing", but said that it contained "some delicious food for the brain and ears."

Stephen Worthy of Mojo said that it was an "extraordinarily beautiful debut", calling it "a visionary synthesis of everyone from Debussy to Bill Evans, Talk Talk to Theo Parrish", while Exclaim!'s Daniel Sylvester called it "a fascinating and confident debut". David Sackllah of Consequence of Sound said that Elaenia "stands out as a remarkably assured debut album" which will "likely confound and impress fans who have been following his output for the past half-decade." Sackllah said that the album was "a confident and fulfilling electronic record meant to be enjoyed in quieter spaces" but found that occasionally the middle section of the album felt too restrained. In his review for The Line of Best Fit, Rory Foster noted that the album was "something that has been worth waiting for" and said that it was "as impressive and rewarding as you want to be." DIY reviewer Danny Wright called the album "mesmerising", saying that it was "clever and warm, sophisticated and joyous." Mixmag's Joseph Twin praised the precision of Shepherd's music and stated that Elaenia "demands focus [...] but pay attention to it and you'll be rewarded." Writing for Resident Advisor, Christine Kakaire said that "it was unlikely the first Floating Points album would've been anything other than beautiful, though its stunning virtuosity turned out more elusive than expected ... despite the record's wall-to-wall gorgeousness, Elaenia can feel tantalisingly out of reach."

== Accolades ==
The album landed on many year-end Best of 2015 lists by various publishers.

Publication	Rank	List
AllMusic	N/A	AllMusic Best of 2015
Bleep	N/A	Bleep's Best of 2015: Albums / EPs
Clash	19	Top 50 Albums of 2015
The Guardian	6	The Best Albums of 2015
NPR	N/A	NPR Music's 50 Favorite Albums of 2015

== Track listing ==
All tracks are written by Sam Shepherd.

No.	Title	Length
1.	"Nespole"	5:08
2.	"Silhouettes (I, II & III)"	10:42
3.	"Elaenia"	7:14
4.	"Argenté"	4:34
5.	"Thin Air"	3:59
6.	"For Marmish"	5:46
7.	"Peroration Six"	5:05
Total length:		42:28

== Personnel ==
- Sam Shepherd – composer, producer, recording, mixing, vocals, artwork
- Tom Skinner – drums (2)
- Leo Taylor – drums (6, 7)
- Layla Rutherford – vocals
- Rahel Debebe-Dessalegne – vocals (2)
- Susumu Mukai – bass (2, 7)
- Qian Wu and Edward Benton – violin (2, 6, 7)
- Matthew Kettle – viola (2, 6, 7)
- Alex Reeve – guitar (6, 7)
- Joe Zeitlin – cello (2, 6, 7)
- John Dent – mastering
- Matthew Cooper – design
- Jason Evans – photography
