= Ayataka =

Brand of iced green tea

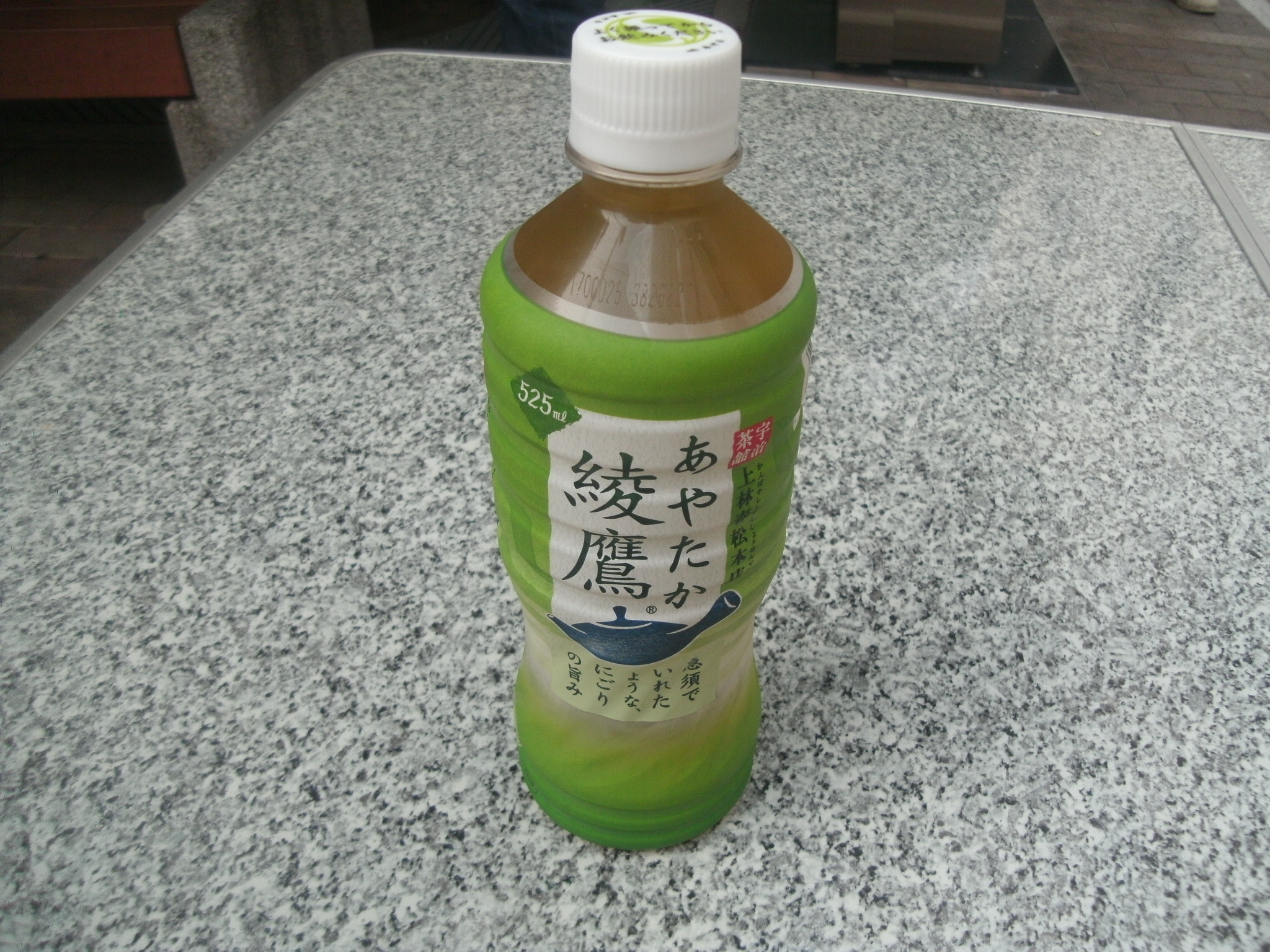
A bottle of Japanese Ayataka (old design)

Ayataka (綾鷹) is a brand of tea produced by The Coca-Cola Company and primarily sold in Japan, and in Malaysia and Singapore under the Authentic Tea House brand. The brand's line of drinks includes matcha, hojicha, and unsweetened iced green teas.

== Collaboration of Ayataka and Kamibayashi Harumatsu ==
The brand's name, Ayataka, is derived from the characters "Aya" and "Taka", meaning "premium green tea". The tea itself is derived from gyokuro, a type of dark green tea which can be found at Kamibayashi Harumatsu groceries.

Sale volume has grown continuously from 2007 to 2019, reaching 6.5 million cases sold one year.

== Product timeline ==
=== 2000s ===
- In 2007, Ayataka launched their first products, sold only in convenience stores and vending machines, and available in sizes 280, 350, and 425 ml.
- In 2008, Ayataka changed their recipe and branding: they increased the amount of tea leaves used in the brewing process, and switched to gyokuro tea leaves. In this year, Ayataka also adopted a new label, and expanded their product range by releasing a yamitaka sencha tea product.

=== 2010s ===
- 2010 saw significant changes to Ayataka's range and production methods, including adopting a recipe that used lower extraction temperatures and sweeter matcha, as well as expanding sizes to 500 ml, 1L, and 2L bottles, and introducing sales channels in supermarkets and mass retailers. Additionally, 2010 brought the release of several new flavors, including Ayataka Ryodama, a cold-steeped mizudashi gyokuro tea, and Ayataka Teruha, a limited-edition autumn brew.
- In 2011, Ayataka rebranded as Ayataka Kamisencha, and released a canned Uji matcha latte product.
- In 2012, Ayataka issued a package re-design, as well as a limited-edition 1.25L bottle size available in Hokkaido.
- In 2013, Ayataka released two limited-edition flavors: Ayataka Yaki Genmaicha tea, and a re-issue of Ayataka Ryodama, initially released in 2010.
- In 2014, Ayataka expanded its line to include 525ml bottles, and switched several products to packaging in peko raku bottles, a more eco-friendly and easily disposable option. Later that year, the brand released "Ayataka Mellow Tailoring".
- In 2016, Ayataka released Ayataka Nigorikono, a lighter brew.
- In 2017, considerable developments were brought to Ayataka's products and their production: 185ml, 525 ml, and 290ml bottles, and bottled hot tea products, a change from the brand's previously iced lineup.
- In 2018, Ayataka released "Ayataka Special Tea", the brand's first product to be intentionally marketed as a health food.

=== 2020s ===
- In 2020, Ayataka renewed the release of their Ayataka Hot and Ayataka Hot Hojicha products, alongside a dark green and special selection tea which were new to the market. These drinks were packaged in new bottles, with designs inspired by traditional Japanese patterns and sales further integrated from convenience stores to supermarkets.
- In 2021, Ayataka launched the "Ayataka Cafe" series, including a matcha latte flavor which brought about competition from brands Itoen ("TULLY'S COFFEE Matcha Latte") and Rinko ("Tea Leave Matcha Latte"). Also during this year, Ayataka launched the Traditional Crafts Supported Bottle, a limited-edition bottle redesign where a portion of sales profits would be donated to support local craftsmen through the Traditional Crafts Industry Promotion Association of Japan. During this initiative, more than 12 million yen was raised and donated.
- In 2022, Ayataka launched a sakura-themed bottle, as well as a reusable, 280ml plastic bottle intended for re-heating tea. This year also saw the addition of Hojicha Latte and Matcha Chocolate flavors to the Ayataka Cafe line, as well as a canned version of Ayataka's Matcha Green Tea.
- In 2023, Ayataka released "Ayataka Cafe Teapot Coffee", a green tea-infused coffee drink, as the fourth installment in Ayataka's Cafe product line.

== Consumer Campaigns ==
=== Initial web promotion ===
Following Ayataka's first year of business, the company ran an anniversary advertisement campaign which was visually focused on the presentation of sencha tea leaves.

=== Collaboration with Blade of Extinction ===
In collaboration with the anime series Blade of Extinction, Ayataka released six bottles themed around the characters. The campaign was also active on X (formerly Twitter), where users could enter a drawing for a Blade of Extinction-themed gifts.

=== Hikaru Utada advertisement ===
In April 2024, stemming from a decrease in purchases, Ayataka launched a commercial starring Hikaru Utada, intending to target younger audiences. The campaign was successful, and sales in the following quarter grew by more than 20% year-on-year.

== Comments ==
1. ^ In September 2022, the brand name was changed to "TULLY'S &TEA" only for over-the-counter products.
2. ^ The main (the five people who are chatting in the ending) are 桂雀松 * At that time, 桂 笑福亭三喬 *At that time, 桂若ば 桂小雀 , 桂紅雀 , 桂小雀 .
