= Floating Points =

British musician and producer

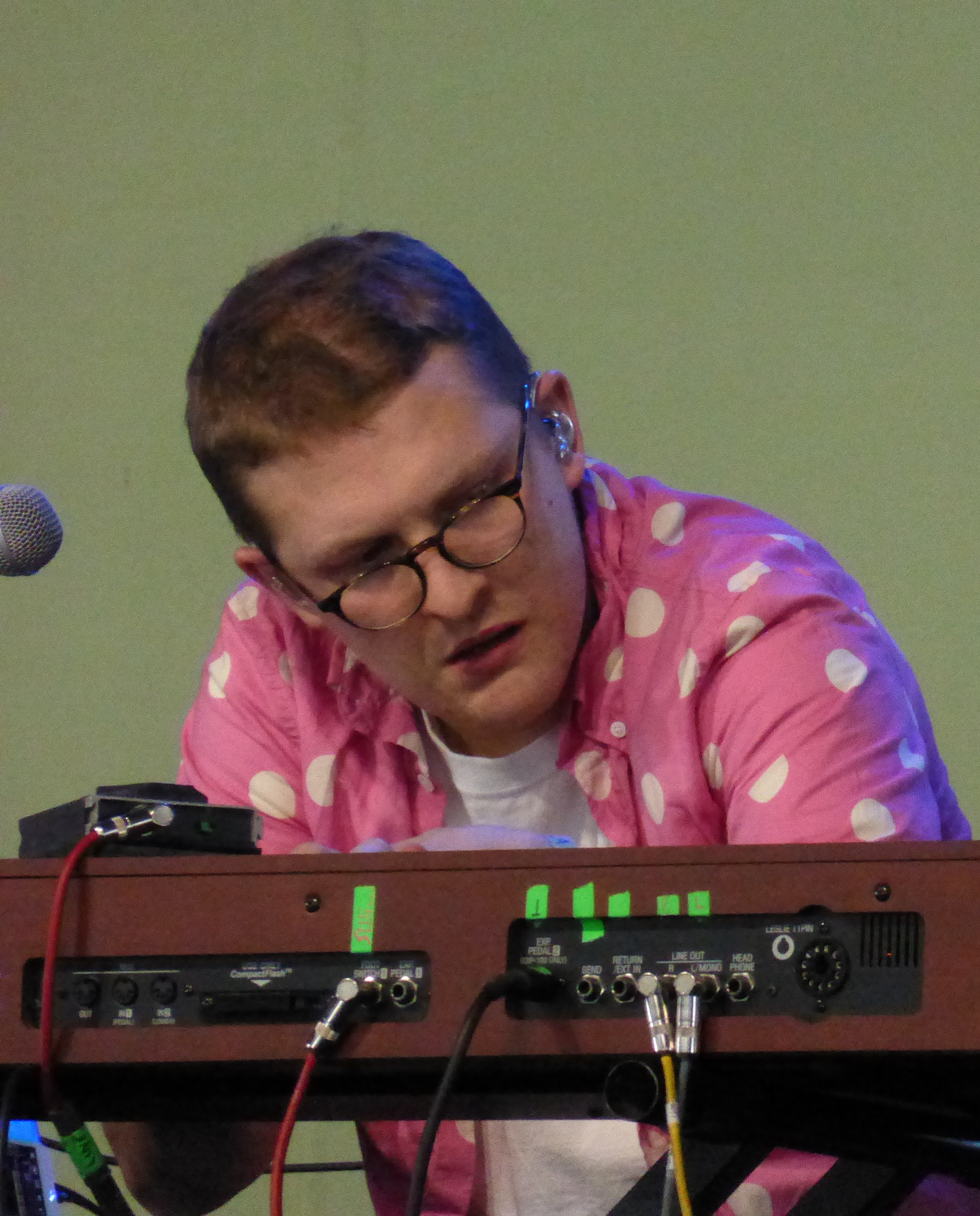
- Floating Points live at Coachella in 2017

Background information
- Born: Samuel Thomas Shepherd; 1986 (age 39–40); Manchester, England
- Genres: Electronic; jazz
- Occupations: Record producer; DJ
- Years active: 2008–present
- Labels: Pluto Records; Eglo Records; Luaka Bop; Ninja Tune; Planet Mu; Deutsche Grammophon
- Website: floatingpoints.co.uk

Samuel Thomas Shepherd (born 1986), known professionally as Floating Points, is a British electronic music producer, DJ, and musician. He is the founder of Pluto Records, co-founder of Eglo Records and leader of a 16-piece group called Floating Points Ensemble.

== Biography ==
Raised in Manchester, England, Shepherd studied piano at Chetham's School of Music before receiving a Ph.D. in neuroscience and epigenetics at University College London. His Ph.D. research focused on pain responses and the aberrant expression of RNAs in neurons, and included academic publications in neuroscience. He also worked as a DJ at Plastic People, a London club, in the late 2000s.

In late 2008, Shepherd and Alexander Nut launched the Eglo record label. Eglo Records had released music by Floating Points, Fatima, Funkineven, Steve Spacek, Dego & Kaidi, Shafiq Husayn, K15, Mizz Beats, Natalie Slade, Destiny71z, Shy One, Henry Wu, Chunky and others.

In 2010, Shepherd performed with a 16-piece live incarnation of Floating Points, entitled the Floating Points Ensemble. The group won an award for "Best BBC Radio 1 Maida Vale Session".

In 2015, Shepherd founded Pluto records. He released projects such as Eleania, Kuiper, Crush, and Reflections: Mojave Desert from the label.

Shepherd's musical influences include Claude Debussy, Olivier Messiaen, and Bill Evans. He began releasing work under the Floating Points moniker in 2008, and in 2017 toured with The xx.

He has also remixed musicians such as Thundercat, Caribou, Basement Jaxx, Skepta & Headie One.

== Career ==
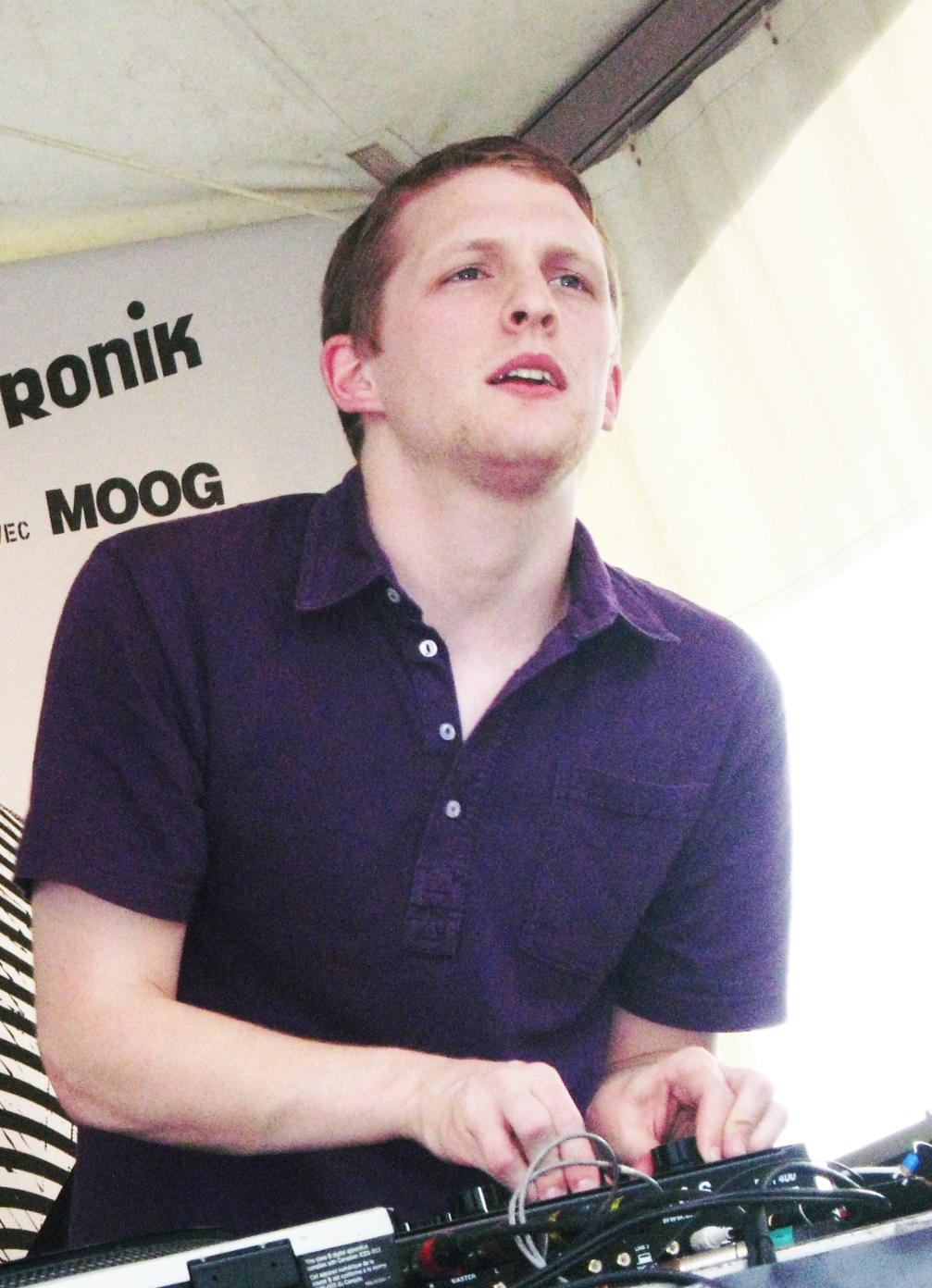
Floating Points performing in Montreal, 2011

Shepherd's first release was the Vacuum EP in 2008 on Eglo Records. Over the next few years, he would continuously release EPs and singles on Eglo, but also other labels such as Planet Mu. Notable releases included 2011's Shadows EP and 2014's "King Bromeliad" / "Montparnasse".

On 6 November 2015, Shepherd released the first Floating Points album, Elaenia. Around its release, Shepherd launched an 11-piece live show and immediately sold out a string of global live dates including headline shows at Islington Assembly Hall and two dates at Electric Brixton in London. At Metacritic, which assigns a normalised rating out of 100 to reviews from mainstream critics, Elaenia received an average score of 85, based on 20 reviews, indicating "universal acclaim". Hamill Industries and Floating Points created the exhibition ‘Future Shocks’ at 180, The Strand in London in collaboration with FACT. The exhibition featured an installation by Hamill called "Vortex".

In 2017, Shepherd released Reflections: Mojave Desert. The album recording was accompanied by a short film produced by long-time collaborator Anna Diaz Ortuño of Hamill Industries. The album was recorded in August 2016 in the Mojave Desert when Shepherd and his band were rehearsing for their upcoming US tour. Floating Points explained: "Whilst we were out playing and exploring the area around us—the sound reflecting from the rocks, the sound of the wind between them, complete stillness at night and packs of roaming coyotes in the distance—it became apparent that we could use this as its own unique recording environment."

On 29 March 2019, Shepherd contributed a DJ mix to the Late Night Tales series.

On 18 October 2019, Shepherd released the album Crush. It received positive reception upon release. At Metacritic, which assigns a normalized rating out of 100 to reviews from music publications, the album received an average score of 81 based on 16 reviews, indicating "universal acclaim". Shepherd embarked on a tour following the album's release, selling out shows at Printworks, Elysee Montmartre, and Funkhaus Berlin.

During lockdown, Shepherd collaborated with KDV Dance Ensemble and Boiler Room to host an interactive live stream on Zoom. He was interviewed by the New York Times.

On 26 March 2021, Shepherd released a collaborative album with Pharoah Sanders and the London Symphony Orchestra, entitled Promises. It was nominated for the Mercury Prize 2021 and reached #6 in the Official UK Albums Chart and #1 in the Official UK Vinyl Albums Chart. The album was released on New York label Luaka Bop. Sanders was impressed by Elaenia and befriended Shepherd, who was 40 years younger than him. Sanders proposed that they produce a collaborative album. Shepherd composed the music and played both electronic and non-electronic instruments.

After Sanders' death in 2022, Shepherd put together a one-time live performance of the album at the Hollywood Bowl, conducted by Miguel Atwood-Ferguson with an ensemble cast including Sam Shepherd, Kieran Hebden, Dan Snaith, Shabaka Hutchings, Kara Lis Coverdale, Hinako Omori. The Independent reviewed the performance, calling it "A near perfect body of music paired with a beautiful tribute" and gave it 4/5 stars.

In 2022, Shepherd released the singles "Vocoder", "Grammar", "Promises", and "Someone Close". In 2023, Shepherd released "Birth4000".

He collaborated as a producer for Japanese American singer-songwriter Hikaru Utada's album Bad Mode, working on the songs "Bad Mode", "Kibunja Naino (Not In The Mood)" and "Somewhere Near Marseilles".

Shepherd composed an original score for the ballet Mere Mortals which premiered on 26 January 2024. The ballet, performed by the San Francisco Ballet and featuring choreography from Aszure Barton, contextualised the ancient parable of Pandora's box in AI. Shepherd worked with long-time creative collaborators Hamill Industries. The initial run of shows sold out. A second run was planned for April 2024. The score was released as a studio album in August 2026.

He took over the 6 Music Artist in Residence radio slot on July 15, 2024.

Shepherd, along with Kamasi Washington and Bonobo, composed music for the 2025 Japanese anime television series Lazarus, directed by Shinichirō Watanabe. In June 2026, all three collectively won "Best Original Score for Animation" at the Music Awards Japan for their work on the soundtrack.

== Discography ==
=== Studio albums ===
- Elaenia (2015)
- Crush (2019)
- Cascade (2024)

=== Collaborative albums ===
- Promises (with Pharoah Sanders and the London Symphony Orchestra) (2021)
- Mere Mortals (with the San Francisco Ballet Orchestra) (2026)

=== DJ mix albums ===
- Late Night Tales: Floating Points (2019)

=== Soundtrack albums ===
- Lazarus (Adult Swim Original Series Soundtrack) (2025)

=== EPs ===
- Vacuum EP (2009)
- Shadows EP (2011)
- Kuiper (2016)
- Reflections – Mojave Desert (2017)

=== Singles ===
- "J&W Beat" (2009)
- "Love Me Like This" (2009)
- "For You" (2009)
- "People's Potential" / "Shark Chase" (2010)
- "Post Suite" / "Almost in Profile" (2010) (as Floating Points Ensemble)
- "Sais (Dub)" (2011)
- "Marilyn" (2011)
- "Danger" (2011)
- "Wires" (2013)
- "King Bromeliad" / "Montparnasse" (2014)
- "Sparkling Controversy" (2014)
- "Nuits Sonores" / "Nectarines" (2014)
- "Kuiper" (2016)
- "For Marmish Part II" (2016)
- "Silurian Blue" (2017)
- "Ratio" (2017)
- "LesAlpx" (2019)
- "Last Bloom" (2019)
- "Anasickmodular" (2019)
- "Bias" (2020)
- "Vocoder" (2022)
- "Grammar" (2022)
- "Problems" (2022)
- "Someone Close" (2022)
- "Birth4000" (2023)
- "Del Oro" (2024)
- "Key103" (2024)
- "Ocotillo" (2024)
- "Dexion" (from Lazarus soundtrack) (2025)
- "Corner of My Eye" (2025)
- "Falling to Earth" (with the San Francisco Ballet Orchestra) (2026)

=== Remixes ===
- Sébastien Tellier - "L'amour et la violence" (2009)
- Little Dragon - "After the Rain" (2009)
- Bei Bei & Shawn Lee - "Make Me Stronger" (with Floating Points Ensemble) (2009)
- Four Tet - "Sing" (2010)
- Bonobo - "Eyesdown" (2010)
- Basement Jaxx - "Feelings Gone" (2010)
- Daedelus - "Tailor-Made" (2011)
- The Invisible - "Wings" (2012)
- The Invisible - "Life's Dancers" (2016)
- Headie One feat. Skepta - "Back to Basics" (2019)
- Thundercat feat. Ty Dolla $ign & Lil B - "Fair Chance" (2020)
- Ultraísta - "Ordinary Boy" (2020)
- Caribou - "Never Come Back" (2020)
- Caribou - "Sister" (2021)
- Herbert - "Fantasy" (2022)
- Tomaga - "Intimate Immensity" (with Marta Salogni) (2022)
- Sakanaction - "Years" (2023)
- Jorja Smith - "Little Things" (2024)
- Turnstile - "Sole" (2026)
